= Fox News Live =

American TV news program

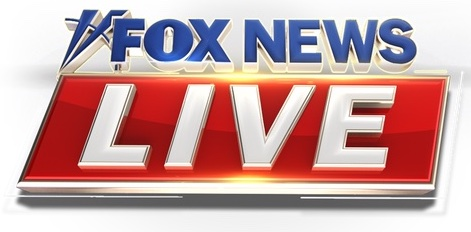
- Presented by: Aishah Hasnie (Saturday); Alicia Acuna; Gillian Turner; Mike Emanuel; Jacqui Heinrich; Bill Melugin; Bryan Llenas; Rotating Anchors
- Country of origin: United States

Production
- Production locations: New York City; Washington, D.C. Los Angeles
- Camera setup: Multi-camera
- Running time: 76-84 minutes (Saturday & Sunday)

Original release
- Network: Fox News
- Release: 1999 – present

Related
- The Live Desk, Weekend Live, Fox Online, America's News Headquarters, America's Newsroom, and The Glenn Beck Program

Fox Real Time logo on Fox News

Fox News Live is an American news-talk television program, the hard-news daytime programming of the Fox News Channel. It also referred to the short headline segments of nearly every hour on Fox News.

== About ==
The show featured news, guest analysis, and interviews. Like other American cable news stations, there is news mixed with feature-like stories, as well as commentary and short debates between people on opposite sides of issues, usually between associates of candidates and officials, think-tank members, and journalists.

The headline segments, shown during every non–hard news hour throughout the day, were usually two-to-three-minute recaps of the news of the day, unique to Fox News Channel with an added timestamp on the intro graphic.

Supplementing headline updates, FNC introduced a fast-paced version of these headline updates in 2006, called "Fox Real Time," which appeared during live news coverage, typically only being one-minute in length. After the first year of their introduction, their appearances greatly diminished, and eventually only appeared during hours of Weekend Live

Since the network originally started the continuous hours of Fox News Live in the morning, they have slowly shifted away from the setup, replacing the 3:00 p.m. and 1:00 p.m. hours of the programming with Studio B in 2002, and DaySide in 2003 respectively. In 2006, DaySide was then replaced with The Live Desk due to Mike Jerrick and Juliet Huddy (the then hosts of DaySide) leaving the network to host the syndicated morning talk program, The Morning Show. In 2007, the shift continued with the replacement of the first two hours with America's Newsroom. In November 2007, with the addition of Happening Now and America's Pulse to the weekday lineup all weekday airings of Fox News Live have been discontinued. However, the Fox News Live format continues with America's Election HQ and later after election, America's News HQ, which airs on all FNL slots at the weekend. On March 5, 2021, it was announced that America's News HQ was renamed "Fox News Live."

== Anchors ==
=== Show Anchors ===
- Aishah Hasnie, 2026—present (Saturdays)
- Molly Line, 2016—present
- Alicia Acuna, 2017–present
- Gillian Turner, 2017—present
- Mike Emanuel, 2021—present
- Bryan Llenas, 2023–present
- Bill Melugin, 2023—present

=== Headline Segment Anchors ===
- Jonathan Hunt, 2002—present
- Marianne Rafferty, 2006–present
- Kevin Corke, 2014—present
- Jackie Ibañez, 2014—present
- Jon Scott, 2018—present
- Ashley Strohmier, 2020–present
- Chanley Painter, 2024–present

=== Run Times ===
Saturday

- 12 PM EST — 2 PM EST: Aishah Hasnie (2026—present)

Sunday

- 12 PM EST — 2 PM EST: Rotating Anchors

Over Nights (Weekends)

- Bottom of every hour starting at 8 PM EST: Rotating Anchors

=== Former Show Anchors ===
- Dari Alexander, now at WNYW in New York City
- David Asman, now an anchor on Fox Business
- Patti Ann Browne, no longer at Fox News
- Kiran Chetry, left for CNN; no longer there
- Jamie Colby, now host of Strange Inheritance on Fox Business
- Rita Cosby, left for MSNBC; no longer there
- Laurie Dhue, left for WPIX in New York; no longer there
- Kristin Fisher, now at CNN.
- Courtney Friel, left for KTLA in Los Angeles
- Rick Folbaum, left for WFOR in Miami, now at WANF in Atlanta
- Lauren Green, now chief religion correspondent for Fox News
- Bill Hemmer, now co-host of America's Newsroom
- Catherine Herridge, was host of Weekend Live Saturdays. Now at CBS News.
- E.D. Hill, was host of America's Pulse. No longer at Fox News.
- Page Hopkins, was co-host of Fox & Friends Weekend. No longer at Fox News.
- Gregg Jarrett, now a Fox News legal analyst and commentator
- Griff Jenkins, 2020—2025, now host of Fox & Friends Weekend
- Martha MacCallum, now host of The Story with Martha MacCallum
- Brigitte Quinn, now anchoring mornings at 1010 WINS radio in New York City. No longer at Fox News.
- Jon Scott, now host of Fox Report Weekend
- Bob Sellers, left for WTTG in Washington, D.C.; no longer there
- Jane Skinner, was co-host of Happening Now. No longer at Fox News.
- Shepard Smith, no longer at Fox News
- Linda Vester, no longer at Fox News
- Leland Vittert, now at NewsNation.
- Arthel Neville, now reporter on Fox News
- Eric Shawn, now a weekday reporter on Fox News

=== Former Headline Segment Anchors ===
- Dari Alexander, now at WNYW
- Julie Banderas, during weekends
- Patti Ann Browne, during Your World with Neil Cavuto and Glenn Beck, substitute anchor
- Janice Dean, substitute anchor, also a meteorologist
- Ainsley Earhardt, overnight
- Harris Faulkner, weeknights and during Special Report with Brit Hume
- David Folk Thomas, no longer at Fox News
- Donna Fiducia, no longer at Fox News
- Aishah Hasnie, Former weekend overnight Anchor, Now Congressional Correspondent
- Carol Iovanna, no longer at Fox News
- Gregg Jarrett, Saturday mornings, also a substitute anchor
- Uma Pemmaraju, also a substitute anchor
- Suzanne Sena, weekend overnight

== Chronology ==
| Time slot | Last aired | Followed program |
|---|---|---|
| 9 am-11 am | February 9, 2007 | America's Newsroom |
| 11 am-1 pm | November 2, 2007 | Happening Now |
| 1 pm-2 pm | May 13, 2003 | DaySide |
| 2 pm-3 pm | November 2, 2007 | America's Pulse |
| 3 pm-4 pm | August 9, 2002 | Studio B |
| 5 pm-6 pm | 2000 | The Big Story |
| 6 pm-7 pm | 1998 | Special Report with Bret Baier |
| Weekends | 2002 | Weekend Live |
| Weekends | February 24, 2008 | America's Election Headquarters |
