= List of New York City television and film studios =

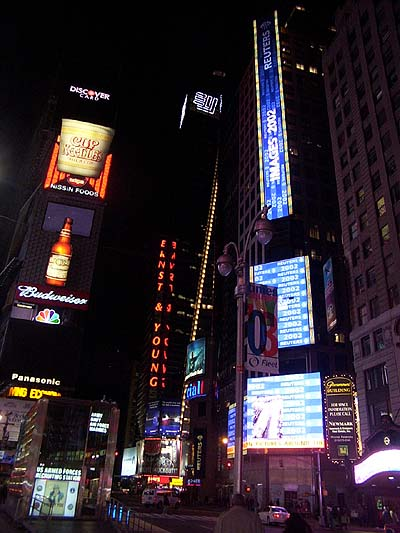
Times Square is home to many of the country's TV studios, as well as the heart of New York's theater district.

- All Mobile Video
  - AVM Unitel, 57th Street, 515 West 57th Street: houses CenterStage
  - Chelsea Studios, 221 West 26th Street: a historic soundstage dating back to 1914
- Asset TV, 570 Lexington Avenue, full service live broadcasting studio
- Axa Equitable Center, 787 Seventh Avenue, includes AXA Equitable Production Group Auditorium, Atrium, and Media Studio
- Cine Magic East River Studios - 11, 29, 33 Kent Street and 8, 10, 12, 18, 28, and 38 Java Street, Brooklyn, NY 11101 - www.eastriverstudios.com
- Cine Magic LIC Studios - 30-15 48th Avenue, Long Island City, NY 11101 - www.cinemagiclic.com
- Disney
  - ABC Studios New York, 7 Lincoln Square includes: ABC News World Headquarters, Live with Kelly and Ryan, ABC World News Tonight with David Muir
  - Times Square Studios, home of ABC's Good Morning America
- Broadway Stages, home of Blue Bloods and The Good Wife
- Broadway Video – Production company behind Saturday Night Live.
- Brooklyn Fire Proof Stages, a full-service TV and Film Qualified Production Facility.
- Brooklyn Studios, 8-16 43rd Ave Queens, NY 11101, a full service production studio facility with four locations in Long Island City. Brooklyn Studios offers soundproof soundstages, drive-in access, kitchen sets, high ceilings, production offices, spectacular rooftop views of the city skyline, and more!
- Samson Stages Brooklyn's Premier Video Production Facility & Soundstage, A Level 2 Qualified Production Facility.
  - The Nutroaster: former home of Worst Cooks in America, Beat Bobby Flay, and Orange is the New Black.
  - The Seltzer Room Studios, production stage for I Origins, The Big Sick, and Sleepwalk With Me.
- Chelsea Piers, studios for Law & Order, Law & Order: Criminal Intent and CBS Sports Network, former studio of Spin City
- Cairo Entertainment Co., a full service television & film production company associated with Pitchfork (film)
- dvDepot Studio and Equipment Rental House
- Contra Studios, 122 West 26th Street, production stage for Californication / House of Lies
- Eastern Effects in Brooklyn: studio for The Americans
- Emerging Pictures
- Fox Corporation
  - Fox News television studios at 1211 Avenue of the Americas
    - B - After the Bell, Fox Business Tonight, Making Money and Varney & Co.
    - D - Gutfeld!
    - E - Bulls & Bears, Countdown to the Closing Bell, First Things First, Fox Report and Journal Editorial Report
    - G - Cavuto Live, Mornings with Maria and Your World with Neil Cavuto
    - J - America's Newsroom, America Reports, Fox & Friends First, Justice with Judge Jeanine, Sunday Morning Futures with Maria Bartiromo and Hannity
    - M - The Five, Fox & Friends, Outnumbered, Watters' World and The Story with Martha MacCallum
    - N - The Evening Edit
    - W - Fox Weather
  - Fox Television Center at East 67th Street
    - WNYW
  - Fox Entertainment – American film and television production and distribution company, offshoot and spin-off of the previous Fox Entertainment Group, bought by The Walt Disney Company
- Gigantic Studios, 207 West 25th Street STE 600, New York, NY 10001
- GUM Studios, Film Studios, NYC
- Hayden 5 Production Studio, 22 W 27th Street
- Industrial Stages
- JC Studios: formerly NBC's Brooklyn Color Studio, in Midwood, Brooklyn; former studio for The Cosby Show, Hullabaloo, Another World and As the World Turns
- Kaufman Astoria Studios: home of Sesame Street
- Live X, Live Streaming: studio shoots and field production
- Manhattan Center: former home of ESPN2's Cold Pizza, original home of WWE's Monday Night RAW
- MCM Creative: Production and post-production company with stages located in Chelsea
- Metropolis Group: former studio for Food Network's Emeril Live
- MIMO Studios
- NBCUniversal
  - NBC Studios in Rockefeller Center, includes:
    - Studio 1A, studio for The Today Show, NBC Nightly News
    - Studio 3A, studio for MSNBC
    - Studio 3C, studio for MSNBC
    - Studio 3K, studio for WNBC local news
    - Studio 4E, studio for MSNBC
    - Studio 6A, currently vacant, former studio for Megyn Kelly Today, Maya & Marty, The Meredith Vieira Show, "Dr. Oz", Late Night with Conan O'Brien
    - Studio 6B, studio for The Tonight Show Starring Jimmy Fallon; former studio for Late Night with Jimmy Fallon and WNBC
    - Studio 6E, NBC News NOW
    - Studio 8G, studio for Late Night with Seth Meyers; former studio for The Rosie O'Donnell Show, Football Night in America and Donahue
    - Studio 8H, studio for Saturday Night Live
- NEP Group
  - NEP Midtown Studio, 885 Second Avenue
  - NEP Penn Studios, 401 Seventh Ave (Hotel Pennsylvania) former home of The Maury Povich Show
  - NEP Studio 33, 503 West 33rd (sale and impending demolition announced Dec 2015) former home of Al Jazeera America and VH1 NY Studio.
  - NEP Studio 37, 36 West 37th Street
  - NEP Studio 52, 727 Eleventh Avenue; home of The Daily Show
  - NEP Studio 54, 513 West 54th St.; former home of The Colbert Report
  - NEP Studios Fifth Avenue (Studio A, B & C), 401 Fifth Avenue; former home of The People's Court
- NY1 Television Studios at Chelsea Market
- Skydance Corporation
  - CBS Broadcast Center:
    - Studio 33: 60 Minutes, former home of The CBS Evening News with Walter Cronkite
    - Studio 41: The Drew Barrymore Show
    - Studio 42: Last Week Tonight with John Oliver / Desus & Mero / The Good Dish / Real Sports with Bryant Gumbel
    - Studio 43: CBS Sports / CBS Sports Network (CBS co-productions of NCAA March Madness coverage with Turner Sports)
    - Studio 44: CBS Sports Network
    - Studio 45: CBS Sports (mostly Paramount Plus) / Inside Edition
    - Studio 46: WCBS-TV & WLNY
    - Studio 47: CBS Weekend News (Sunday)
    - Studio 57: CBS News Streaming Network and CBS Morning News, Former home of CBS This Morning
    - Studio 57 Newsroom: CBS News Streaming Network
  - Ed Sullivan Theater, aka CBS Studio 50: studio for The Late Show with Stephen Colbert; former studio for Late Show with David Letterman and The Ed Sullivan Show
  - Studio 1515 in One Astor Plaza, Times Square
  - CNN
    - CBS Mornings, Former home of MTV's Total Request Live
    - Former home of the CNN New York City Studio, in Deutsche Bank Center
    - Studio at 30 Hudson Yards, home of CNN News Central, former home of Early Start
- RiverBridge Studios: Level 2 Production Facility, Staten Island
- Production Central, independent green-screen studio located near Union Square
- Sesame Workshop – The nonprofit educational media production organization behind the Sesame Street series.
- Sony
  - Screen Gems Studios, former studio for Rachael Ray, Guiding Light and The Edge of Night
  - Sony Pictures Classics – New York-based independent film production and distribution studio and offshoot of TriStar Pictures producing and distributing arthouse and foreign films.
- Silvercup Studios in Long Island City, Queens; studio for The Sopranos, Sex and the City, Ugly Betty, 30 Rock, Gossip Girl, and Fringe
- Steiner Studios, in the Brooklyn Navy Yard
- WNET Studios at Lincoln Center
- Vigilant NYC: in Flushing, Queens, location for two music videos by Swet Shop Boys
- Nexstar Media Group
  - WPIX Studios in the Daily News Building
  - NewsNation's Dan Abrams Live and Cuomo, also in the Daily News Building
