= Bill Hemmer Reports =

American television news show (2002–2021)

- Also known as: Studio B with Shepard Smith (2002–2013); Shepard Smith Reporting (2013–2019); Fox News Reporting (2019–2020)
- Genre: News; Talk show
- Presented by: Bill Hemmer
- Country of origin: United States
- Original language: English

Production
- Production location: New York City
- Camera setup: Multi-camera
- Running time: 60 minutes

Original release
- Network: Fox News Channel
- Release: August 12, 2002 – January 15, 2021

Bill Hemmer Reports is an American television news show on Fox News Channel hosted by Bill Hemmer. Episodes aired at 3 p.m. ET on Monday through Friday. The show focuses on the day's events with interviews, current event updates, and comprehensive reporting. The show was part of the Fox News program lineup since January 20, 2020, and was the number-one cable news broadcast in its time slot.

== Synopsis ==
The program continues coverage of stories followed during prior hours of Fox News programs. The show often takes a swifter pace compared to the network's other programming, making a larger focus of the program on breaking-news events with live correspondents. The coverage includes correspondents on location, in studio, in addition to analysis from pundits or experts.

== Shepard Smith Reporting ==
The program's relaunch included the conclusion of the weekend edition of Studio B, hosted by Trace Gallagher, which was started in February 2006. Studio B replaced the 3-4 p.m. ET hour of Fox News Live (also hosted by Smith) in 2002, and the weekend hour of Fox News Live in 2006. The weekend editions were discontinued in May 2007, when the 3-4 p.m. timeslot was replaced by reruns of War Stories with Oliver North, or other taped programming. Trace Gallagher hosted Studio B as a fill-in anchor whenever Smith was absent.

Also in 2007, Smith revealed that the program would soon get a more expansive overhaul, which may include name and format changes. This is partly because FNC's physical Studio B is no longer available for the network's use. In February 2008, Studio B moved to Studio E, the set used by Fox & Friends and the Fox Report.

On January 9, 2009, Studio B moved to Studio 12H, the set used by the Fox Report due to its move to the high definition Election Night set used by Fox. Despite the actual studio name, Shepard Smith stated that this studio will be the new Studio B, "because that is the name of the program". While Studio B moved to the aforementioned HD set, it continued to broadcast in 4:3 with the Fox News HD wing at the side, until March 23, 2009, when the show began broadcasting in full 16:9.

During the week of September 26 – October 2, 2011, the Fox Report moved into its former studios, Studio E, which was used from September 2007 to December 2008 at the same time, Studio B moved into the newsroom and Shepard Smith announced on the September 28 broadcast that the Fox Report and Studio B moved into a new set on October 10, 2011. On that date, Studio B and the Fox Report introduced a new look and graphics featuring the new lower-thirds graphics for the show as seen on other Fox News Channel shows, The Five and Happening Now. Shepard Smith presented the show from a modified Studio 12H featuring more monitors and retaining "The Cube" but the overhead platform and accompanying staircase, which had been part of the set since 2008 had been removed.

On October 7, 2013, Studio B was relaunched as Shepard Smith Reporting with new graphics and a new state of the art studio called "The Fox News Deck" in Studio H.

== Bill Hemmer Reports ==
The program was temporarily rebranded Fox News Reporting on October 14, 2019, upon Shepard Smith's departure from Fox News.

On January 20, 2020, Bill Hemmer, who was previously co-anchor of America's Newsroom, took over as the new anchor of this program, which accordingly changed its final title to Bill Hemmer Reports. The show ended on January 15, 2021, after Fox News announced a new programming lineup. The Story with Martha MacCallum took over the time slot.

== Controversy ==
On September 28, 2012, Studio B inadvertently broadcast the suicide by gunshot of 33-year-old JoDon F. Romero, who carjacked a vehicle in Phoenix, resulting in an 80-mile (130 km) police pursuit that ended near Salome, Arizona. Shepard Smith implored his technical staff to cut off the helicopter feed from Fox-owned station KSAZ-TV after the suicide made it to air during live coverage. Following an abrupt commercial break, Smith issued an on-air apology for a broadcast delay failure made by the channel's master control operators. In a statement, Fox News Channel executive vice president of news editorial Michael Clemente, acknowledged the error in broadcasting the suspect's suicide: “We took every precaution to avoid any such live incident by putting the helicopter pictures on a five second delay. Unfortunately, this mistake was the result of a severe human error and we apologize for what viewers ultimately saw on the screen.” Fox News was sued for unspecified damages by Romero's wife due to this incident. She claimed that her children had seen the video of Romero's suicide and subsequently became traumatized. In February 2014, the lawsuit was dismissed by Judge John Rea, who ruled the coverage was protected by the First Amendment and the plaintiffs were unable to "satisfy the essential elements of claiming intentional infliction of emotional distress." In August 2015, the verdict was upheld in an Arizona appeals court.

== Location ==
Shepard Smith Reporting was broadcast from Studio D (The Fox News Deck) at 1211 Avenue of the Americas (also known as the News Corp. Building) in New York City. Bill Hemmer Reports also broadcast from the Fox News Deck studios.
