= America's News Headquarters =

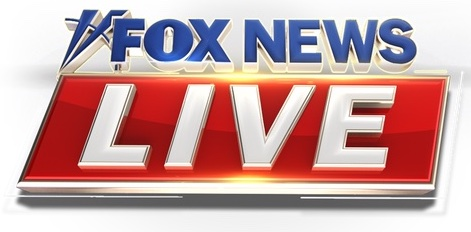
- Also known as: America’s News Headquarters (2008-2021)
- Genre: Hard news program
- Starring: Various Fox News anchors
- Country of origin: United States
- Original language: English

Production
- Production locations: New York City and Washington
- Camera setup: Multi-camera
- Running time: 5 hours (Saturday); 3 hours (Sunday)

Original release
- Network: Fox News
- Release: November 5, 2008 – January 19, 2009
- Release: November 14, 2016 – September 29, 2017
- Release: November 8, 2008 – present

Fox News Live (seen on air as America's News HQ) was a weekend afternoon news program broadcast on Fox News Channel; it also refers to the headline recaps showing at the top and bottom of the non-hard news hours. The show has also been broadcast from 1-4am (weeknights) or 1-6am (weekends) ET during nights of heavy breaking news/event coverage. During election years the program is temporarily replaced by America's Election Headquarters. The term "America's HQ" (and later "News HQ" / "Election HQ") is seen on the bottom of the channel's rotating logo (on the left hand side) after the Election season.

America's News HQ follows the same format as its predecessor, Fox News Live.

The weekday edition of America's News HQ was replaced on the schedule with The Daily Briefing with Dana Perino on October 2, 2017.

== History ==
The former short-lived weekday 5:00 p.m. ET broadcast was hosted at various intervals by Jane Skinner, Heather Nauert, Jon Scott, Martha MacCallum, Bill Hemmer, and Megyn Kelly. On January 19, 2009, Glenn Beck took over this time slot when he began hosting a self-titled show, The Glenn Beck Program. America's News HQ continued airing on the weekends.

On May 2, 2009, the program broadcasting from the network's New York City studios launched in high-definition (HD). On October 3, 2009, the program broadcasting from the Fox News' Washington, D.C. studios also launched in HD.

The weekday edition was relaunched following the 2016 U.S. presidential election, taking the same 2:00 p.m. ET time slot previously held by America's Election HQ. Melissa Francis, formerly a semi regular co-host of Outnumbered, has become the most frequent host of the show's weekday version. Sandra Smith, now co-host of America's Newsroom, anchored both the first (on November 14, 2016) and last broadcasts (on September 29, 2017) of this version.

Currently, America's News HQ airs from Noon to 6pm ET each Saturday. On Sunday, it airs from Noon to 2pm and 3pm to 5pm ET.

As of March 6, 2021, America's News Headquarters rebrands as "Fox News Live" airing in the same time slots as the former newscast.

== Anchors ==
=== Show Anchors ===
- Griff Jenkins, 2020—present
- Molly Line, 2016—present
- Alicia Acuna, 2017–present
- Gillian Turner, 2017—present
- Jacqui Heinrich, 2021—present
- Mike Emanuel, 2021—present
- Aishah Hasnie, 2022—present
- Bryan Llenas, 2023–present
- Bill Melugin, 2023—present

=== Headline Segment Anchors ===
- Jonathan Hunt, 2002—present
- Marianne Rafferty, 2006–present
- Kevin Corke, 2014—present
- Jackie Ibañez, 2014—present
- Jon Scott, 2018—present
- Ashley Strohmier, 2020–present
- Chanley Painter, 2024–present

=== Run Times ===
Saturday

- 10 AM EST --- 12 PM EST: Rotating Anchors
- 12 PM EST --- 2 PM EST: Griff Jenkins, Rotating Anchors

Sunday

- 12 PM EST --- 1 PM EST: Rotating Anchors
- 1 PM EST --- 2 PM EST: Mike Emanuel

Over Nights (Weekends)

- Bottom of every hour starting at 8 PM EST: Chanley Painter, Rotating Anchors

== Hosts ==
Regular

- Leland Vittert - Weekend afternoons
- Arthel Neville – Saturday afternoon/evenings; Sunday midday/mid-afternoons
- Eric Shawn – Saturday afternoon/evenings; Sundays midday/mid-afternoons

Semi Regular

- Gillian Turner - Weekend afternoons
- Kristen Fisher - Weekend afternoons
- Jillian Mele - Fill in
- Molly Line - Weekend afternoons
