= Fox Online =

- Title card for Fox Online
- Genre: Talk/News program
- Presented by: Bill Hemmer (weekdays); Jamie Colby (weekends)
- Country of origin: United States
- Original language: English

Production
- Production location: New York City
- Camera setup: Multi-camera
- Running time: 60 minutes

Original release
- Network: Fox News Channel
- Release: August 28, 2006 – October 14, 2007

Fox Online is an American talk/news program on the Fox News Channel.

== Original Weekday Edition ==
Originally broadcast weekdays at noon ET, the program revolved around the main news stories of the day and their ties to the Internet. The network's website, FoxNews.com, was also heavily featured, as the program showcases various stories and videos from the site, with a major focus on politics using FoxNews.com's partnership with RealClearPolitics.com.

Hosted by Bill Hemmer from August 2006 to February 2007, the program was a replacement for the noon hour of Fox News Live. The original program ceased production on February 9, 2007, with the launch of America's Newsroom. Hemmer joined America's Newsroom with Megyn Kelly as a co-host and the hour Fox Online broadcast in returned to Fox News Live, then hosted by Jon Scott, now host of Happening Now with Jane Skinner.

== Weekend Edition ==
Following the network's continuing move towards "branded programming" over multiple hours of Fox News Live, the network re-introduced Fox Online on July 14, 2007, with Jamie Colby as host at 2 PM EST. Compared to the original program, the new edition continued the cover the news of the day, though the extent of the inclusion of the Internet has changed dramatically.

The program also pressed on the use of different segments, including "Online Crime", a focus on a crime story of the day; "Refresh", taking a review at the headline story the program started with; and a number of other segments with a tech-style themed title. Due to FNC's weekend line up changes in October 2007, however, the show was canceled.
