= Arthel Neville =

American journalist

- Born: Arthel Helena Neville; October 20, 1962 (age 64); New Orleans, Louisiana, U.S.
- Education: University of Texas at Austin
- Occupations: Television news anchor and reporter, television personality
- Years active: 1984–present
- Employer(s): Fox News; Tegna Inc. CNN
- Spouses: Derrick Lassic (m. 1995; div. 1998); Taku Hirano (m. 2001)
- Parent(s): Art Neville, Doris Neville

Arthel Helena Neville (born October 20, 1962) is an American journalist, television personality, and weekend anchor for Fox News, based in Manhattan alongside co-anchor Eric Shawn.

== Biography ==
Arthel Neville is the daughter of Doris Neville and Art Neville, a Grammy Award-winning singer, songwriter, keyboardist, solo artist and founder of the New Orleans music groups The Hawketts, The Meters, and The Neville Brothers. She is the niece of Grammy Award-winning singer Aaron Neville, as well as the cousin of singer Ivan Neville.

She was born and raised in New Orleans, Louisiana, and graduated from St. Mary's Dominican High School in New Orleans. After graduating, she traveled to New York City to pursue acting and modeling. She landed commercials and a small role on the soap opera All My Children before returning to New Orleans. She enrolled in pre-pharmacy at Xavier University before switching to journalism at Southern Methodist University. She transferred to the University of Texas at Austin, where she was able to earn a bachelor's in journalism while also working as a reporter.

She began her career as a general assignment reporter at KVUE-TV while a junior at the University of Texas at Austin School of Journalism, now known as Moody College of Communication.

== Career ==
The first female African-American on-air reporter at KVUE-TV, her general assignment beat took her to the streets of Austin covering live breaking news, politics, education, health, and human-interest stories.

Neville's first job after graduation was in New Orleans as a reporter/anchor for WWL. In 1988 she moved back to Texas for a one-year stint as a reporter for Houston's KHOU-TV. Neville returned to New Orleans as an anchor/reporter for WVUE.

In 1991 she landed the host spot on Extreme Close-Up, a one-on-one celebrity interview show that she co-produced for E! Entertainment TV. During three years with the program she logged over 200 interviews with Hollywood stars ranging from Will Smith, Tom Cruise and Sharon Stone, to music icons such as David Bowie, Whitney Houston and Sade, becoming the nation's first high-profile black female entertainment reporter. During this period she also covered live entertainment events for the network and occasionally filled in as a guest host on their signature show Talk Soup (hosted by Greg Kinnear). In 1994 she beat out over 1,000 hopefuls to launch and anchor Extra for Warner Brothers studios, becoming the first African-American woman to host a nationally syndicated entertainment news magazine program. Neville remained with Extra until 1996 when the program was revamped. In 1997, she teamed up with Los Angeles sportscaster Fred Roggin to host The Arthel & Fred Show, a syndicated daytime entertainment news program that lasted only one season. A year later, Neville left Los Angeles for New York and became a senior correspondent on the Fox Network's syndicated news magazine Fox Files, and at Fox News as an anchor, correspondent, host of Celebrity Spotlight, and weekly contributor on The O'Reilly Factor.

Neville co-hosted the Miss Teen USA 1993 pageant with Dick Clark, and the Miss Universe 1994 pageant in Manila, Philippines with Entertainment Tonight's Bob Goen. She has also appeared on Days of Our Lives, Monk, Girlfriends, Moesha, Cybill, Living Single, and The Fresh Prince of Bel Air.

In 2002 Neville joined CNN to become the host of TalkBack Live with Arthel Neville, becoming the first African-American woman to host her own signature show on the news network. The hybrid format show presented news of the day and featured live interaction with audience members and guests, in-studio, via satellite, phone, and internet. While at CNN, she also anchored morning and daytime news, and co-anchored weekend news with Anderson Cooper from CNN's Atlanta and New York City bureaus.

In 2003 Neville was recognized by the University of Texas at Austin for her outstanding contribution to broadcast journalism. She received the Texas Exes' Outstanding Young Texas Ex Award, which is bestowed upon four University of Texas alumnae under the age of 45 who have reached a level of excellence in their respective fields.

Later, Neville co-hosted Fox's nationally syndicated morning show Good Day Live with Steve Edwards and Debbie Matenopoulos, hosted Celebrity Hobbies on the DIY Network, and served as a correspondent for the 2005 revival of the syndicated news magazine A Current Affair. On that show, she garnered much acclaim for her coverage of Hurricane Katrina in her hometown of New Orleans. In March 2006, she joined the Fox News–produced syndicated news magazine Geraldo at Large as the West Coast bureau chief and correspondent. She also served as guest co-host on The View in the fall of 2006.

On August 1, 2008, Neville became the lead anchor for the Fox 5 Morning News, a four-hour weekday newscast on KSWB-TV in San Diego. Within a year, she made an impact on the San Diego community as evidenced by her nomination by San Diego Magazine for their 2009 Woman of the Year Award.

In addition to her anchoring duties for Fox and KSWB-TV, Neville was a recurring guest on HLN Showbiz Tonight. In May 2009, Neville's show Conversations with Arthel Neville, a one-on-one celebrity interview show produced through her company, began airing on My Channel on Sky TV (British Sky Broadcasting), Fox's sister network in the United Kingdom to 9 million homes in England, Scotland, Ireland, Wales, and the Channel Islands, as well as parts of Germany, France, Sweden, Switzerland, Austria, Denmark, and Italy.

In June 2010, Neville returned to Fox News as a news anchor on America's Newsroom, America's News Headquarters, and Happening Now, a contributor on The O'Reilly Factor and Red Eye w/Greg Gutfeld, and fill-in anchor on America Live with Megyn Kelly. She also served as a correspondent from New Orleans for the fifth anniversary of Hurricane Katrina for Studio B with Shepard Smith and Fox Report.

Neville is currently the weekend anchor at Fox News with Saturday and Sunday midday, afternoon and evening newscasts of "Fox News Live," formerly known as America's News Headquarters.

On October 28, 2016, Neville was honored at the University of Texas at Austin as a Texas Exes 2016 Distinguished Alum.

In 2017, Neville was awarded the Moody College of Communication's DeWitt Carter Reddick journalism award as their first African American female honoree. Past recipients have included Walter Cronkite, Bill Moyers, Dan Rather and Ted Turner.

Also in 2017, Neville started projects outside of and in addition to her news career. She launched her accessories line Arthel Neville Design, featuring handbags adorned with her quotes promoting female empowerment.

Neville also was announced as the host of the show "Sing Like A Star" by Tegna, Inc. The interactive, weekly cross-platform singing competition is filmed in Neville's hometown of New Orleans in conjunction with WWL-TV and debuted September 16, 2017.

On May 18, 2018, Neville was the keynote speaker for the commencement ceremony at her alma mater, the Moody College of Communication at The University of Texas at Austin.

On March 5, 2021, America's News Headquarters, Neville's weekend newscast with co-anchor Eric Shawn was announced as renamed as "Fox News Live."

== Personal life ==
She was married to former NFL running back Derrick Lassic from 1995 to 1998. She has been married to percussionist and recording artist Taku Hirano since 2001.

== See also ==
- New Yorkers in journalism
- List of people from New Orleans
