= 1211 Avenue of the Americas =

Office skyscraper in Manhattan, New York

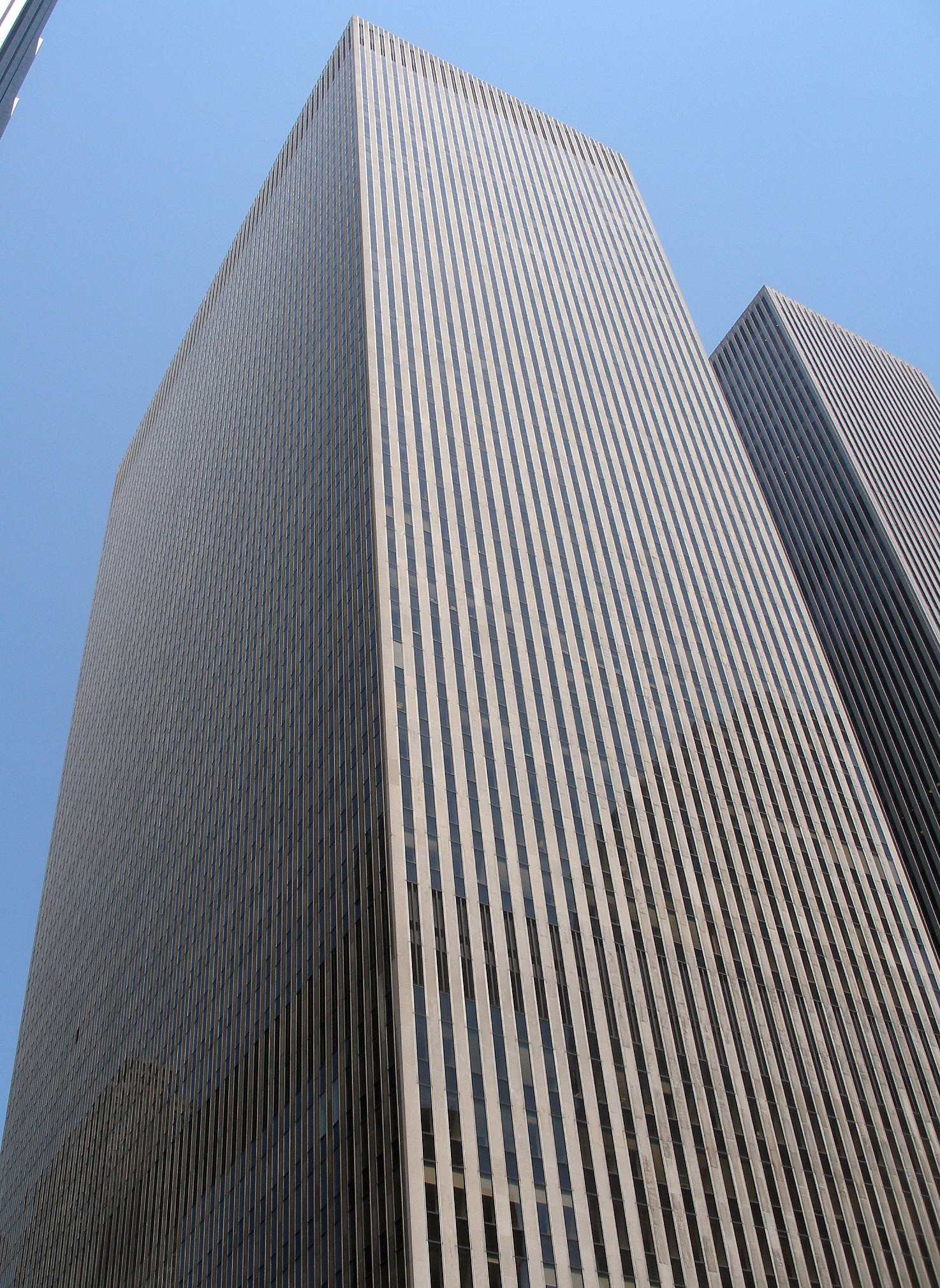
- 1211 Avenue of the Americas in Midtown Manhattan
- Alternative names: Celanese Building; News Corp. Building

General information
- Status: Completed
- Type: Offices and television studios (Dow Jones & Company, Fox News, New York Post, The Wall Street Journal)
- Architectural style: International Style
- Location: 1211 Avenue of the Americas, New York City, U.S.
- Coordinates: 40.758464°N 73.981806°W
- Construction started: 1968
- Completed: 1971
- Opening: 1973
- Owner: Ivanhoé Cambridge

Height
- Roof: 592 ft (180.44 m)
- Top floor: 558 feet (170 m)

Technical details
- Floor count: 45
- Floor area: 1,854,912 sq ft (170,000 m^{2})
- Lifts/elevators: 36

Design and construction
- Architects: Wallace Harrison (Harrison, Abramovitz & Harris)
- Developer: Rockefeller Group Development Corporation
- Main contractor: Celanese Corporation and Rockefeller Center, Inc.

1211 Avenue of the Americas, also known as the News Corp. Building or the FOX Building, is an International Style skyscraper on Sixth Avenue in the Midtown Manhattan neighborhood of New York City. Formerly called the Celanese Building, it was completed in 1973 as part of the later Rockefeller Center expansion (1960s–1970s) dubbed the "XYZ Buildings". Celanese, its primary tenant, later moved to Dallas, Texas. The building is owned by Ivanhoé Cambridge as of 2023.

The structure has a simple slab-like shape devoid of any decoration, its prosaic façade consisting of vertical alternating limestone and glass stripes. The façade stone piers are supernumerary; there are twice as many of them as structurally necessary. The glass bands are contiguous and offer no indication of floor levels. These features ably create the visual lack of scale, so the tower does not look overly bulky.

== Background ==
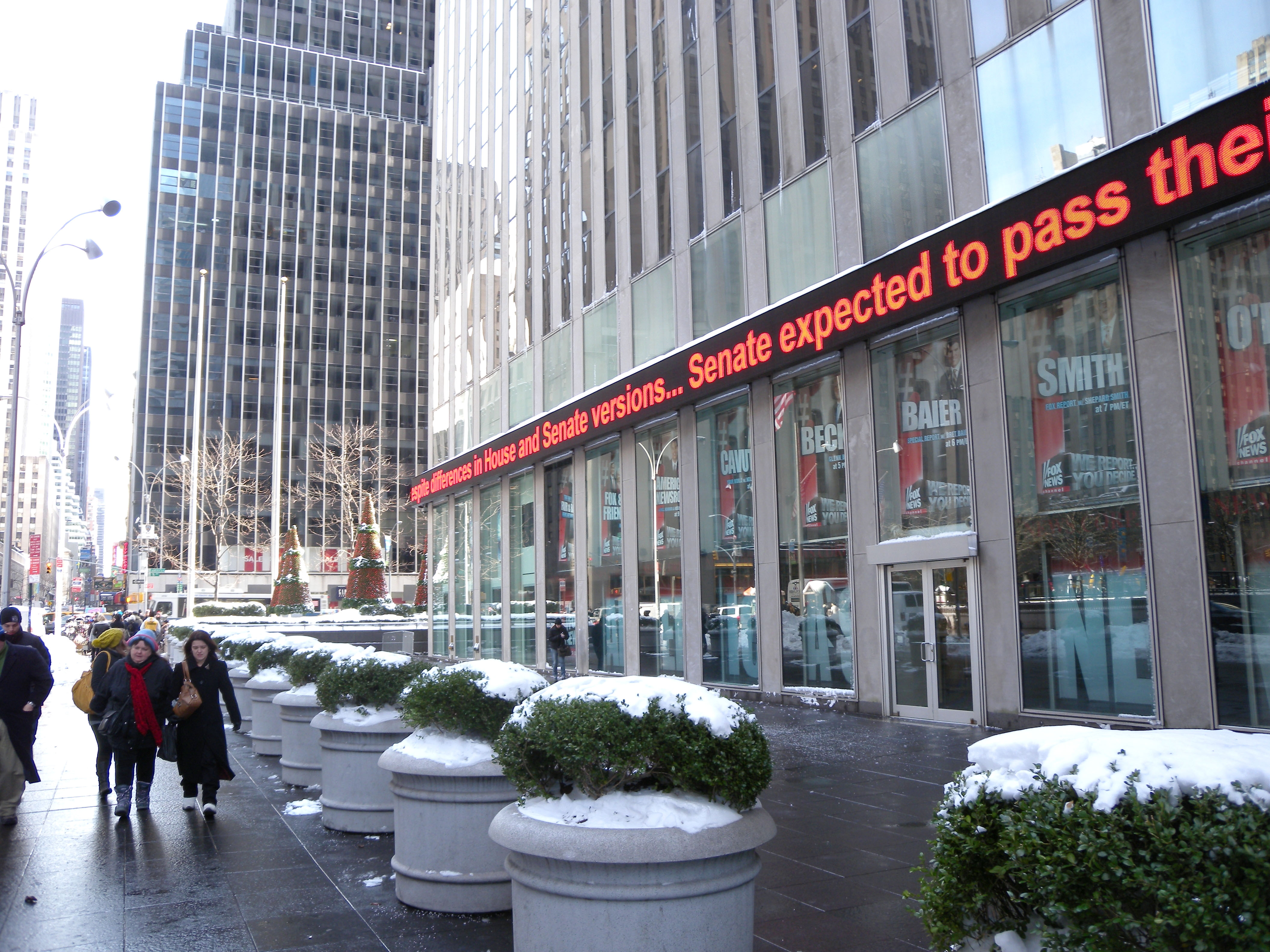
Fox News studios at street level

The building was part of the later Rockefeller Center expansion (1960s–1970s) dubbed the XYZ Buildings. Their plans were first drawn in 1963 by the Rockefeller family's architect, Wallace Harrison, of the architectural firm Harrison & Abramovitz. Their letters correspond to their height. 1251 Avenue of the Americas is the "X" Building as it is the tallest at 750 ft (229 m) and 54 stories, and was the first completed, in 1971. The "Y" is 1221 Avenue of the Americas, which was the second tower completed (1973) and is the second in height (674 ft and 51 stories). The "Z" Building, the shortest and the youngest, is 1211 Avenue of the Americas with 45 stories (592 ft).

The structure is LEED-certified at a silver-level designation by USGBC. In January 2025, RXR Realty bought a 49% ownership stake in 1211 Avenue of the Americas. RXR subsequently refinanced the building that October for $1.45 billion and announced plans to renovate the building.

== Notable tenants ==
The building served as the global headquarters for the original News Corporation, founded by Australian-born businessman Rupert Murdoch in 1980. It continues to serve as the headquarters for subsequent spin-offs Fox Corporation (2019–present) and the present-day News Corp (2013–present), and until 2019, 21st Century Fox (2013–2019). The building is well-known for housing the main Fox News studios, part of the Fox News Group which is currently owned by Fox Corp, as well as its streetside plaza, known as Fox Square. News Corp divisions housed located in the building include Dow Jones & Company, The Wall Street Journal, and the New York Post. News Corp and Fox Corp renewed their leases for a combined 1.2 million square feet (110,000 m^{2}) for 20 years in 2023, but Fox vacated one-fourth of that space in 2025.

Other companies unaffiliated with News Corp that lease office space in the building include Annaly Capital Management and Ropes & Gray LLP.

== Studios ==
- B - After the Bell, Fox Business Tonight, Making Money, and Varney & Co.
- D - Gutfeld!, Fox News Saturday Night
- E - Bulls & Bears, Countdown to the Closing Bell, First Things First, and Journal Editorial Report
- G - Cavuto Live, Mornings with Maria, and Your World with Neil Cavuto
- J - America's Newsroom, America Reports, Fox & Friends First, Justice with Judge Jeanine, Sunday Morning Futures with Maria Bartiromo, and Hannity
- M - The Five, Fox & Friends, Outnumbered, Jesse Watters Primetime, and The Story with Martha MacCallum
- N - The Evening Edit, America's Weather Center, and Fox Report
- W - Fox Weather

== See also ==
- List of tallest buildings in New York City
