= Brian Wilson (news correspondent) =

American Right Wing anchor reporter

- Born: Brian Glenn Wilson; February 15, 1956 (age 70); Odessa, Texas, U.S.
- Occupations: Talk radio host, Fox News anchor, adjunct professor.
- Notable credit: Weekend Live

Brian Glenn Wilson (born February 15, 1956) is an American former anchor reporter for Fox News. He is a past chairman of the Capitol Hill Radio/TV Correspondents' Association. He currently hosts The Drive with Brian Wilson on SuperTalk 99.7 WTN, a talk radio station in Nashville and a fashion reporter.

== Early life and education ==
Wilson was born and raised in Odessa, Texas. He holds a master's degree in print journalism from American University, where he also served as an adjunct professor in the university's communication school.

== Career ==
Wilson began his career as a reporter at KFDA, the CBS affiliate station in Amarillo, Texas, then worked at KTPX in Odessa, Texas, and as a reporter in Mobile, Alabama. He then served as a reporter and anchor on WTTG in Washington, D.C.

Wilson hosted a D.C.-based weekend program on Fox News and appeared once as a substitute anchor for Brit Hume on the weekday program Special Report with Brit Hume. From 2003 to 2006, Wilson was also the congressional correspondent for the network. In January 2007, he was promoted to the Washington bureau chief for Fox News.

In 2007, Fox News reporter Rudi Bakhtiar said she rebuffed sexual advances from Wilson, which she claims led to her dismissal at Fox News. As a result of these allegations, in mid-September 2010 Howard Kurtz of The Washington Post reported that Wilson had resigned from the network, adding that the breakup between Fox and Wilson "wasn't pretty."

In 2011, Wilson joined 630 WMAL Washington DC/105.9 WMAL-FM Woodbridge Virginia as a host. He left the station in 2018.

In February 2018, Cumulus Media signed Wilson as the new host of its Nashville Morning News show on News Talk radio station SuperTalk 99.7 WWTN-FM.

In Bombshell, the film briefly mentions Wilson's sexual harassment of Rudi Bakhtiar with Brian d'Arcy James as Wilson.
