= Geraldo at Large =

- Logo used 2009–2011
- Also known as: Geraldo Rivera Reports
- Genre: News magazine
- Created by: Geraldo Rivera
- Presented by: Geraldo Rivera
- Starring: Laurie Dhue (2007–2008); Laura Ingle; Phil Keating; Arthel Neville
- Country of origin: United States
- Original language: English

Production
- Production location: New York City
- Camera setup: Multi-camera
- Running time: 60 minutes

Original release
- Network: Syndicated; Fox News Channel
- Release: October 31, 2005 – January 26, 2007 (Syndicated)
- Release: February 10, 2007 – May 25, 2015 (FNC)

Related
- A Current Affair At Large with Geraldo Rivera; The Greg Gutfeld Show

Geraldo Rivera Reports, also known as Geraldo at Large, is an American television news magazine hosted by Fox News correspondent-at-large and former talk show host Geraldo Rivera.

== History ==
Debuting in national syndication on October 31, 2005, as a replacement for A Current Affair, the show had been on Fox News Channel in a slightly different format since July 6, 2002, as the program, At Large with Geraldo Rivera.

Rivera emphasized that the show would be about "people." The program was seen by Rivera as a test for a potential evening newscast produced by the Fox News Channel. The program aired in the time slot normally designated for national news programs in many markets. However, the program was more similar to the show that it replaced, A Current Affair, in its focus on tabloid-type stories.

Anchors and correspondents from Fox News, including anchor Laurie Dhue, Laura Ingle, Phil Keating, and Arthel Neville, served as correspondents of the newsmagazine.

On October 3, 2009, Geraldo at Large began broadcasting in 720p HD and debuted a whole new on-air look, which included a new program logo and new graphics.

In January 2014, the show went on hiatus but returned on March 8, 2014, as Geraldo Rivera Reports. It aired occasionally until The Greg Gutfeld Show replaced it in 2015.

=== End of syndication ===
On January 4, 2007, it was announced that the syndicated program would be canceled due to a "soft ad marketplace, the lack of an early news lead-in for his show in several cities and the timeline for financial success." The program's final syndicated episode aired on January 26, 2007.

=== Return to Fox News Channel ===
The show returned to the Fox News Channel weekends on February 10, 2007. While the show has not been officially cancelled, it was replaced by The Greg Gutfeld Show in 2015, which took over its 10 PM time slot.

== Anchors and correspondents ==
- Laurie Dhue (2007–2008)
- Kimberly Guilfoyle
- Laura Ingle
- Phil Keating
- Arthel Neville
- Craig Rivera
