= E. D. Hill =

American journalist

E.D. Hill
- Born: Edith Ann Tarbox; July 27, 1961 (age 65); United States
- Education: University of Texas at Austin
- Occupations: Journalist and VJ
- Spouse(s): Marc Philip Weill (m. 1989–1995) J. David Donahey (divorced) Joe Hill (m. 2002)
- Relatives: Sanford Weill, ex-father-in-law

Edith Ann "E.D." Hill (née Tarbox; born July 27, 1961), known previously as E.D. Weill from her first marriage, is an American journalist. She has been an anchor for Newsmax since 2026 and formerly worked for the Fox News Channel and CNN.

== Early life and education ==
Hill earned her bachelor's degree in journalism from the University of Texas at Austin, located in Austin, Texas, where she was a member of Delta Gamma sorority.

== Career ==
She was a VJ for VH1 from September 1986 to August 1987. She landed roles as a reporter and spent time at WPXI-TV, WHDH-TV, and WABC-TV where she was brought in to co-anchor the station's morning newscast as well as its just launched midday broadcast. During this time Hill was still using her maiden name, Edye Tarbox.

In 1998, Hill joined Fox News, where she served as an anchor for Fox & Friends from 1998 to 2006. She later moved to the 2:00 p.m. hour after serving as host of the 11:00 a.m. to 12:00 p.m. block of Fox News Live from 2006 until her show America's Pulse was canceled in 2008. She also co-hosted Bill O'Reilly's The Radio Factor for five years. She had also substituted for Bill O'Reilly on The O'Reilly Factor.

In 2007, the television-industry blog TV Newser reported that it had been given a copy of an internal Fox News Channel memorandum that gave the following description of America's Pulse: "During this hour, E. D. will present the news in a fair & balanced way with her own passionate style and sense of humor."

=== "Terrorist fist jab" incident ===
On the June 6, 2008, episode of America's Pulse, Hill asked whether a fist bump between then-presidential candidate Barack Obama, and his wife Michelle, after the final 2008 Presidential Democratic primaries was a "terrorist fist jab." Hill, introducing an upcoming discussion before a commercial break, posited that the gesture was either "A fist bump? A pound? [or] A terrorist fist jab?," but never explained the term when the segment continued after the break. The incident set off a controversy among bloggers and television commentators. Hill apologized for her comments the next day. The next week, the Fox News Channel announced that Hill's show America's Pulse had been canceled. Martha McCallum's show The Live Desk would become two hours (1–3 p.m.), and Trace Gallagher would become a co-host with McCallum.

In November 2008, after the general election, it was announced that Hill's contract with Fox would not be renewed. She would continue with the network until her contract expired. Senior Vice President of Programming at Fox Bill Shine says that he "chose not to renew E.D.'s latest contract" but noted that "Hill has been a valued contributor to the success of FNC over the years, and we wish her all the best."

On October 14, 2008, Hill was a guest co-host of the ABC daytime show The View, then returned to co-host again on September 23, 2009 and September 25, 2009, while Elisabeth Hasselbeck was on maternity leave; she also hosted on July 28, 2010, while Barbara Walters was on leave.

In February 2011, it was announced that she would be joining the staff of In the Arena with Eliot Spitzer on CNN, but just five months later CNN elected to cancel the show instead.

Glenn Beck announced on his GBTV Show August 20, 2012 that E.D. Hill would be part of GBTV's on-site coverage of the 2012 Republican National Convention in Tampa, FL.

On October 6, 2012, Hill moderated The Rumble in the Air-Conditioned Auditorium, a debate between Bill O'Reilly and Jon Stewart.

=== Awards ===
Hill won a local Emmy Award for Outstanding News Special while working for WHDH-TV in Boston (1990–91), and has also received a Golden Quill Award for live spot news reporting.

=== Books ===
In November 2005, William Morrow published Hill's first book, a collection of personal profiles entitled Going Places: How America's Best and Brightest Got Started Down the Road of Life. Her next book, I'm Not Your Friend, I'm Your Parent, was published in the United States 2007 and published in China in 2010.

=== Employment history ===
Year	Employer	American location	Position	Notes
1984–1985	KDLH-TV	Duluth, Minnesota	anchor and reporter	
1985–1986	KXXV	Waco, Texas	anchor and reporter	
1987	VH-1	national	VJ	
1987	WCBS-TV	New York City, New York	news writer and producer	
1987–1989	WPXI-TV	Pittsburgh, Pennsylvania	anchor	
1989–1990	CBS News	national	business anchor, CBS Morning News and CBS Radio	
1990–1992	WHDH-TV	Boston, Massachusetts	anchor	
1992–1995	WABC-TV	New York City, New York	anchor and reporter	
1998–1999	Fox News	national	anchor, Fox News Live	
1999–2006	Fox News	national	co-host, Fox & Friends	
2006–2007	Fox News	national	anchor, Fox News Live	
2007–2008	Fox News	national	anchor, America's Pulse	
2000–2005	Fox News Radio	national	co-host, The Radio Factor with Bill O'Reilly	
2008–2009	Fox News	national	anchor	
2010–2011	CNN	national	anchor, In the Arena with Eliot Spitzer	
2011–2012	CNN	national	anchor, CNN Newsroom	
2026–2026	Newsmax	national	anchor	

== Personal life ==
On April 29, 1989, while a news anchor at WPXI-TV in Pittsburgh, she married Marc Philip Weill (the son of financier Sanford Weill), at the time a vice president of Smith Barney, Harris Upham & Company in New York City, New York. They had two children and divorced in 1995.

Her second marriage was to J. David Donahey, with whom she has one son.

In February 2002, she announced her engagement to her boyfriend of two years venture capitalist Joe Hill. They married June 1, 2002. He has three children from a previous marriage, and together they have a daughter and a son.

In February 2010, she underwent a preventive double mastectomy.

== See also ==
- List of CNN anchors
- List of University of Texas at Austin alumni
