= Page Hopkins =

American journalist

Page Hopkins is an American journalist who has anchored on Bloomberg Television, Fox News Channel and most recently, she filled in on Early Today on NBC as well as on MSNBC. Hopkins graduated from Wellesley College before beginning a career as a television journalist. Gaining experience first as a producer, and then anchor, for several local network affiliates, Hopkins joined Bloomberg Television as the morning anchor of Moneycast in 1999. In 2002, Hopkins began working at Fox News and became the co-anchor of Fox News Live, Fox & Friends Weekend as well as the Breaking News Desk. She also served as a panelist on The Live Desk, participating in panel discussions of the day’s top stories.

== Early life ==
Hopkins was raised in Seattle, Washington, and graduated from Wellesley College with a Bachelor of Arts in history. She also was a member of the Massachusetts Institute of Technology (MIT) News Study Group while an undergraduate at Wellesley.

== Career ==
Her first job was at the ABC affiliate in West Palm Beach, Florida as an associate producer.

She began her on-camera career as a weekend anchor at KTVE-TV in Monroe, Louisiana, followed by anchoring jobs at WWCP-TV in the Johnstown/Altoona, Pennsylvania market and News 12 New Jersey, a 24-hour cable news television network where she was nominated for an Emmy for her series on the state of the New Jersey foster care system, "Holes in the Safety Net". Prior to joining FOX News, she was the morning anchor of Bloomberg Television's Moneycast, a national business show that aired weekday mornings on the USA Network. While at Bloomberg she also anchored personal finance specials, winning the 2000 Front Page Award for "401(k) Spring Clean-Up". She left Bloomberg for the Fox News Channel where she was an anchor and reporter. She co-anchored the two-hour Sunday morning edition of Fox News Live and was one of the anchors of the highly rated morning show "Fox and Friends Weekend" which runs three straight hours and is largely unscripted. In December 2009, she began filling in on "Early Today" for NBC network and appeared on MSNBC in "First Look" and in prime time reading the news. In June 2010, she and Eliot Spitzer co-anchored the 4pm hour as fill-ins for Dylan Ratigan. Page is represented by HDReps.

== Personal life ==
Hopkins served on the Board of Trustees for Inwood House, a non-profit organization that helps pregnant teens who are homeless or in foster care. She served on the Board of Directors for the Madeira School, a girls' boarding school in Virginia (2012-2018), and the board of Trustees for the Loyola School, a co-ed Jesuit high school in New York City (2016-2022). She currently resides in New York City with her husband and children.
