= Happening Now =

- Happening Now with Jon Scott and Jenna Lee
- Genre: Talk/News program
- Presented by: Jon Scott; Jenna Lee
- Country of origin: United States
- Original language: English

Production
- Production location: New York City
- Camera setup: Multi-camera
- Running time: 60 minutes

Original release
- Network: Fox News Channel
- Release: November 5, 2007 – June 8, 2018

Happening Now is an American news-talk television program that aired on Fox News Channel from November 5, 2007 to June 8, 2018. It was hosted by Fox News anchor Jon Scott for its entire run, with the co-anchors being Jane Skinner and Jenna Lee at various points during its run.

== Overview ==
The show, hosted by Jon Scott, covered the headlines of the day with a different female co-host each week. Happening Now replaced the 11am-1pm ET block of Fox News Live in 2007. On March 23, 2009, Happening Now began broadcasting in high definition.

Jane Skinner announced on June 24, 2010 that she would be leaving Happening Now, citing that she would like to spend more time with her family. Her replacement is Jenna Lee, who hosted and contributed to several programs on Fox Business prior to her move to the Fox News Channel.

On April 28, 2014, Happening Now was split into two one-hour shows (11:00 a.m. to noon ET and 1:00 p.m. to 2:00 p.m. ET) due to that day's debut of Outnumbered.

Jenna Lee announced on June 2, 2017 that she was leaving the program with a mutual decision with the network.

In October 2017, Happening Now was reduced to just 11am time-slot due to the extended hour of the show Outnumbered Overtime.

On America's Newsroom in June 2018, Bill Hemmer and Sandra Smith announced their program would be extended to 3 hours, leading to the cancellation of Happening Now. It was told that Jon Scott would be the host of Fox Report Weekend.
