= Aishah Hasnie =

Pakistani-American television journalist

- Born: October 4, 1984 (age 42); Lahore, Pakistan
- Education: Indiana University Bloomington
- Occupations: News anchor; reporter; journalist
- Years active: 2006–present
- Employer: Fox News

Aishah Hasnie (born October 4, 1984) is a Pakistani-American television journalist, anchor and White House correspondent for Fox News based in Washington, D.C.. In January 2026, she became the host of Fox News Live.

== Biography ==
Hasnie was born in Lahore, Pakistan, on October 4, 1984. Her uncle was a lieutenant commander in the U.S. Navy who sponsored her family to emigrate to the United States. She was raised in Bedford, Indiana, where she graduated in 2002 from Bedford North Lawrence High School.

Hasnie graduated with a B.A. in journalism from Indiana University Bloomington, where she was a Dick Yoakam Broadcast Journalism Scholar. During school, she interned as an on-air reporter at WICS in Springfield, Illinois (where her cousin, Maira Ansari, was a reporter), WTHR in Indianapolis, and Geo News in Pakistan. After school, she accepted a position as investigative reporter and fill-in anchor at WANE-TV in Fort Wayne, Indiana, where one of her investigations led to the state legislature changing the state's voyeurism law. In 2011, she accepted a position as investigative reporter at WXIN in Indianapolis and served as anchor of First at Four.

In January 2019, she accepted a position at Fox News in New York City as an overnight anchor and news correspondent.

In August 2021, she was named congressional correspondent for Fox News. Hasnie serves as a regular guest host of Fox News Live, America's Newsroom and America Reports. In 2026 she was named the permanent host of the 12-2 Eastern block of Fox News Live on Saturday.

Hasnie has been recognized for her work by the Indiana Associated Press and the Society of Professional Journalists. In 2020, Hasnie was named a New York Woman of Impact by Variety for her coverage of the COVID-19 pandemic. In January 2022, Hasnie began her term as a board member of USA for UNHCR, the UN Refugee Agency. She has also filled in for Bret Baier on Special Report on Fox News.
