= Weekend Live =

- Titlecard for Weekend Live
- Genre: News/Talk program
- Presented by: Tony Snow (2002-2003); Brian Wilson (2003-2008)
- Country of origin: United States
- Original language: English

Production
- Production location: Washington, D.C.
- Camera setup: Multi-camera
- Running time: 120 minutes

Original release
- Network: Fox News
- Release: 2002 – February 24, 2008

Weekend Live is an American news/talk television program on Fox News Channel.

The program featured live news story updates from correspondents, analysis from a number of different regular contributors, interviews with newsmakers of the week, and regular subject specific segments. Compared to other programming on the network, it didn't feature a commentary segment, but does have regular one-minute "Fox Real Time" news recaps.

Broadcast live from the network's Washington, D.C. studios from 2:00-4:00 p.m. Saturday and 12:00–2:00 p.m. Sunday ET, the show was hosted by Bret Baier. The show had been previously hosted by Tony Snow from 2002 until 2003 on both ends of the weekend, and from 2003 until his departure to join the White House, on Saturdays, followed by Brian Wilson. Correspondents such as Catherine Herridge and Molly Henneberg served as hosts during its later run.

In March 2008, the program was rebranded as America's Election Headquarters during the 2008 presidential election campaign. It was rebranded as America's News Headquarters after the election.
