= Rudi Bakhtiar =

American journalist

- رودابه بختیار
- Born: Rudabeh Carleen Bakhtiar; 21 June 1966 (age 60); Fresno, California, U.S.
- Education: University of California, Los Angeles
- Occupation: Journalist

Rudabeh Bakhtiar (Persian: رودابه بختیار, born 21 June 1966), better known as Rudi Bakhtiar, is an Iranian-American journalist and television producer. She was a producer for Reuters in Washington, D.C., but is best known for anchoring CNN Headline News Tonight, as well as Anderson Cooper 360, Voice of America, and Reuters News.

== Early life and education ==
Bakhtiar was born on June 21, 1966, in Fresno, California, as Rudabeh Carleen Bakhtiar to Iranian immigrants of Bakhtiari heritage. Her father died of oropharyngeal cancer in 2005. Bakhtiar has a younger brother and younger sister. Shapour Bakhtiar is Rudi Bakhtiar's father's uncle, the last prime minister of Iran under Shah Mohammad Reza Pahlavi; a great aunt of Bakhtiar's was the Shah of Iran's second wife (Soraya Esfandiary). Bakhtiar's great-grandfather was Sardar Jang.

By age two, her family moved from Fresno to Los Angeles. When she was five, her family moved back to Iran, where she attended the American I.E.I. school in Shiraz until 1979 Iranian Revolution. Her family moved back to the United States when she was 17. She loved to ride horses as a child. Other hobbies include whitewater rafting, waterskiing, snow skiing, horseback riding, tennis, yoga, tae kwon do, and oil painting in her downtime.

She attended the University of California, Los Angeles, where she received a Bachelor of Science in biology in 1990, planning to be a dentist. She was accepted to New York University Dental School but had reservations about going to dental school. In addition, she studied architecture at the Career Discovery Program at the Harvard School of Design.

== Career ==
In 1996, Bakhtiar joined CNN and held multiple positions in her nine years at the cable news network, including anchoring CNN Headline News Tonight on the CNN Headline News network. She has co-anchored CNN's Emmy nominated CNN Newsroom and worked as a dedicated correspondent for Anderson Cooper 360. She has reported on assignments from numerous countries in Europe, Africa, and the Middle East, including Rwanda, Ethiopia, South Africa, Iran, Israel, and Palestine.

She also anchored the start of CNN's Headline News coverage of the September 11 attacks. She had left CNN to care for her dying father after almost 10 years in cable news.

In January 2006, Bakhtiar joined Fox News Channel as a general correspondent, reporting on major international news stories such as the Ahmadinejad-al-Maliki summit in Tehran in September 2006 and the trial and execution of Saddam Hussein later that year. In 2007, Fox News terminated its contract with Bakhtiar after she made a complaint of sexual harassment against then Fox Washington Bureau Chief, Brian Wilson.

In 2008, Bakhtiar switched careers to become the first public relations director for the Public Affairs Alliance of Iranian Americans, an organization dedicated to building an inclusive and representative voice for Iranian Americans in the public and political arena. There she produced mini documentaries called Profiles of Iranian Americans, which focused on the lives of successful Iranian Americans. She also created and produced the organization's signature star-studded community event Passing the Torch of Success, before being pushed out of the organization owing to her strong stance on Iran's human rights violations.

In May 2011, Bakhtiar testified before the Senate Foreign Relations subcommittee on Iran's human rights crisis, claiming under the leadership of Ayatollah Khamenei "Iran has become one of the worst violators of human rights in the world...egregiously violating virtually every article of the International Covenant on Civil and Political Rights, of which Iran is a member state."

Bakhtiar worked on an unfinished documentary on Turkey after the failed 2016 Turkish coup d'état attempt and before Michael Flynn was officially named National Security Advisor for President Donald Trump. A Turkish businessman had paid the Flynn Intel Group, a lobbying group in the United States, more than US$500,000 for the making of the film but he was adamant no one knew who they were. Bakhtiar complained she was not being given the opportunity to show a balanced view of the events and said the documentary was going to destroy Fethullah Gülen, a Turkish cleric whom Turkish President Recep Tayyip Erdoğan blamed for the coup attempt and would like to see deported to Turkey from the U.S. In June 2017, Bakhtiar said she had not been contacted by people investigating Mr. Flynn, but by November 2017, it was reported that FBI agents investigating Flynn had contacted Bakhtiar.

== Personal life ==
Bakhtiar is a fan of the New York Yankees and Los Angeles Lakers sports teams.

In 2009, she served as an official festival judge for the Noor Iranian Film Festival in Los Angeles. In 2017, she quit her job at Reuters and moved to Los Angeles, CA to take care of her mother, who had been diagnosed with Alzheimer's disease.

In 2018, she was diagnosed with Parkinson's disease.

== Recognition ==
In 2002, Bakhtiar received the Iranian American Republican Council Achievement Award in recognition of outstanding achievements, excellence, and accomplishments within the Iranian American community. According to Lycos, she was ninth-ranked in the top 20 TV news personalities with the most searches from January through August that year.

In Washington D.C., December 4, 2003, Bakhtiar was the master of ceremonies for the Iranian American Technology Council Gala.

Bakhtiar was also the master of ceremonies for the University of California, Irvine, lecture given by Shirin Ebadi, a Nobel Peace Prize winner, on May 21, 2005.

== Sexual harassment ==
In 2007, Bakhtiar reported to Fox News about alleged sexual harassment by Brian Wilson before his promotion to Washington bureau chief. In public reports published in July 2016, Wilson denied harassing Bakhtiar.

When the matter was being addressed in 2007, Bakhtiar's lawyer said that she had been unlawfully treated and terminated, citing a hostile environment of sexual harassment, quid pro quo sexual harassment, and retaliation. In response, Fox News refuted the allegations by stating that it could not be liable for quid pro quo sexual harassment even if her allegations against Wilson were true because he was not her supervisor at the time of the harassment. Fox News further stated that she could not prove a causal connection between her complaint and the termination of her contract. In 2007 her case went into confidential mediation, and Bakhtiar received a favorable ruling from the mediator. A settlement was reached in which Fox News agreed to pay Bakhtiar the $670,000 remaining on her contract, as well as her legal fees. Although she agreed in her settlement not to speak of her experience at Fox News, she decided to speak in the wake of a sexual harassment lawsuit filed by Gretchen Carlson against longtime Fox News CEO Roger Ailes in July 2016.

A scene showing Bakhtiar being harassed by Wilson is included in the 2019 film Bombshell, in which she is portrayed by Nazanin Boniadi.

== See also ==
- List of Iranian women journalists
