= Mike Emanuel =

American journalist (born 1967)

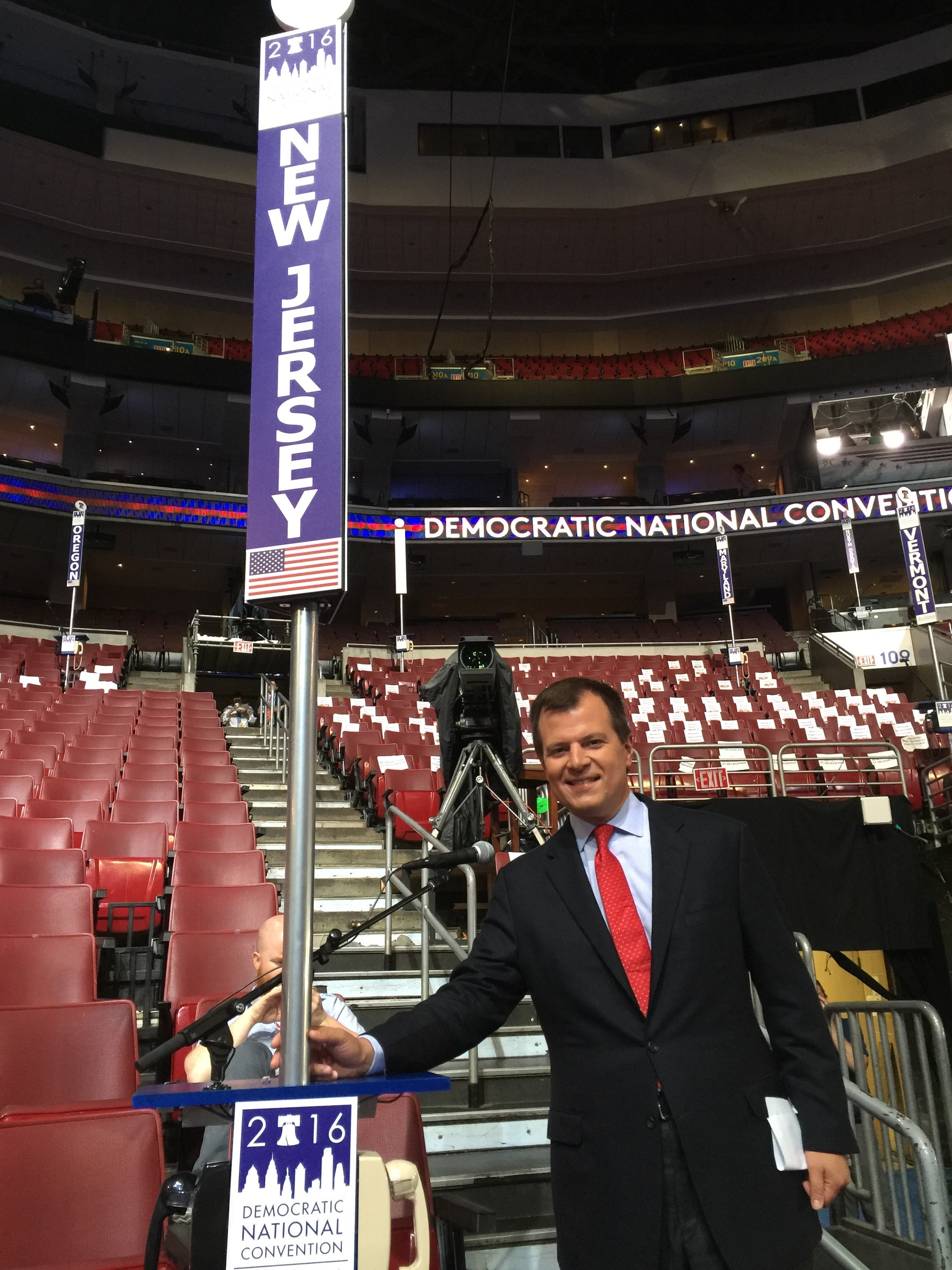
Emanuel at the 2016 Democratic National Convention

Mike Emanuel (born December 10, 1967) is the Chief Washington Correspondent and a former White House Correspondents' Association journalist for Fox News. He has worked for the network since July 1997. He hosts Fox News Live on Sunday at 1 p.m. ET and regularly fills-in on Special Report, Fox News @ Night, Fox News Sunday, America's Newsroom, America Reports, and Fox Report.

Prior to working for Fox News Channel, Mike Emanuel was a television journalist anchor/reporter for local TV stations in Midland-Odessa, Texas, Waco, Texas, Austin, Texas, and Los Angeles.

Emanuel grew up in Westfield, New Jersey. He holds a degree in Communication from Rutgers College of Rutgers University-New Brunswick. During his college years, Emanuel announced Rutgers sports on WRSU-FM.

Mike Emanuel is Greek-American and an Orthodox Christian.
