= Patti Ann Browne =

American journalist

- Born: September 10, 1965 (age 60); New York City, US
- Education: Fordham University New York Institute of Technology
- Occupations: Television news anchor, reporter, and author
- Spouse: Mike
- Children: 1
- Website: Official website

Patti Ann Browne (born September 10, 1965) is an American news anchor and reporter best known for her work with Fox News Channel from 2000 to 2018.

== Education ==
Browne has a bachelor's degree in communications from Fordham University in New York City. Browne was editor of Fordham's literary magazine Alternative Motifs. While at Fordham, Browne worked for Newsweek magazine part-time for four years, and was an intern for Joan Lunden's syndicated weekly television show on parenting called "Mother’s Day" (later "Every Day").

She co-hosted a popular Irish music program on Fordham's far-reaching radio station WFUV-FM (90.7FM). She was also news anchor and News Director of that 50,000-watt station.

Browne earned a master's degree in communication arts from the New York Institute of Technology in Old Westbury, New York. She attended on a full scholarship (teacher assistantship) that involved teaching news-writing and production skills to undergraduates. She was a general assignment reporter for NYIT's award-winning news program LI News Tonight, which airs nightly on Long Island cable.

== Career ==
Browne's professional broadcast career began in radio, at WLIM-AM on Long Island, NY, where she was morning-drive news anchor/writer.

Browne's first television job was nightly anchor and News Director of WLIG TV 55, seen in New York City and on Long Island.

Browne gained network affiliate experience as a full-time anchor/reporter at WSJV- TV in South Bend, Indiana — the region's ABC network affiliate at the time, now a Fox affiliate. Browne headed the station's Michigan Bureau.

Browne joined News 12 Long Island, Long Island's 24-hour cable news television channel covering Nassau and Suffolk. She worked as a general assignment reporter, and spent several years out in the field, covering major stories next to New York City reporters. Browne received praise for her live coverage from the scene of the Long Island Rail Road shooting committed by Colin Ferguson, and for her unscripted anchoring of the crash of TWA Flight 800. Browne went live from Manhattan covering the investigation after the World Trade Center bombing in 1993. She reported from Washington, D.C. covering national issues affecting Long Island, Browne also reported from Albany, New York covering state politics, and from the United Nations during international crises.

She co-anchored the station's highest-rated show, its 3-hour morning news program. She also hosted 'Reporter Roundtable', News 12's weekly half-hour news talk show. Browne spent some mornings as host on WBAB, a popular Long Island FM rock music radio station. She was their substitute news anchor for a brief period, opposite DJ Bob Buchman.

Browne was an anchor for MSNBC, hosting a 2-hour weekend show, Weekend Morning Line. During her years at MSNBC, she covered un-scripted breaking news and conducted live interviews. Browne served as a substitute news anchor on CNBC.

Browne started at Fox News Channel in August 2000, where she hosted the headline update during several Fox News shows and substitute-anchored various shows. Browne was a regular guest-panelist on late night talk show Red Eye w/ Greg Gutfeld. In addition, Browne was one of the rotating co-hosts of the Fox early-morning show Fox & Friends First which directly preceded Fox & Friends. She left the network in February 2018.

In May 2022, her book Write Your Own Story, How I Took Control by Letting Go was published by Post Hill Press, distributed by Simon & Schuster, and advertised as "A witty and candid glimpse of life in cable news from a long-time anchor who walked away from the spotlight and found joy in faith, family, and life’s simple pleasures."

== Personal ==
Browne lives in the New York City area with her husband and son. She grew up in Queens, New York. She has an identical twin sister and a younger sister. Browne is Roman Catholic and was inducted into the Roman Catholic Diocese of Brooklyn's Hall of Fame in 2012.
