= Jamie Colby =

American national news correspondent

- Born: Forest Hills, Queens, New York City, New York, U.S.
- Occupations: Television news anchor and correspondent
- Spouse(s): Marc Wallack (div. c. 2011)

Jamie Nell Colby is an American former national news correspondent and anchor for Fox News. Her last assignment was to host the show, Strange Inheritance, on Fox Business Network and was formerly co-host of America's News Headquarters with Eric Shawn on Sunday mornings. In February 2019, Colby and Fox News Channel parted ways.

== Career ==
Colby has worked for Fox News since July 2003 as National News Correspondent and Anchor. Prior to joining FOX News Channel, Colby was a correspondent for CNN and served as an anchor and reporter for CBS News including fill-in anchor for CBS's Up to the Minute. She was also an anchor for WPIX/WB-11 New York, a reporter at WNYW FOX 5 New York, and a correspondent/co-anchor on FOX News' WebMD TV. Colby is an attorney admitted to practice law in New York, California, Florida and the District of Columbia.

She has received such honors as the Edward R. Murrow National Award in 2002 for her coverage of the September 11 attacks; the Gracie Award for investigative reporting in 2000, and the Clarion Award from the Association for Women in Communications. She was also named Television Week's "Rising News Star To Watch". Aside from her journalism career, Colby, an attorney, served in private practice for 10 years. Her law practice began with a Hollywood entertainment firm that assigned her to The Tonight Show. At 22, she worked for Johnny Carson during his contract renewal with NBC and also his divorce.

Since January 2015, Colby has served as host and reporter on the Fox Business show, Strange Inheritance, which covers quirky or unexpected legacies left behind by friends or family.

== Personal ==
Attending the University of Miami's International School of Business, she earned a Bachelor of Business Administration degree in accounting as well as a Juris Doctor degree from the University of Miami School of Law at age 22.

Colby authored Back to Life After a Heart Crisis: A Doctor and His Wife Share Their 8-Step Cardiac Comeback Plan (ISBN 9781583334195) with her ex-husband Marc Wallack, the Chief of Surgery at Metropolitan Hospital in New York City.
