= Special Report (TV program) =

US television news program

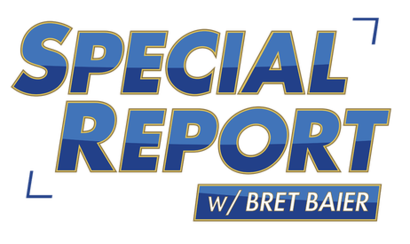
- Also known as: Special Report with Bret Baier
- Genre: Political news and talk
- Presented by: Bret Baier (2009–present)
- Country of origin: United States
- Original language: English
- No. of seasons: 27

Production
- Production locations: Washington, D.C.
- Camera setup: Multi-camera
- Running time: 60 minutes

Original release
- Network: Fox News
- Release: January 26, 1998 – present

Special Report with Bret Baier (formerly Special Report with Brit Hume) is an American television news and political commentary program, hosted by Bret Baier since 2009, that airs on Fox News. It is broadcast live each Monday through Friday at 6:00 p.m. ET. The program focuses on both reporting and analysis of the day's events, with a primary focus on national American political news. The show has been a part of the Fox News program lineup since 1998 and is the number one cable news broadcast in its time slot.

== Format ==
The program reports on the day's events, usually focusing on political stories out of the nation's capital, particularly on the President, Congress, and the Supreme Court.

A typical show begins with news stories featuring various Fox News correspondents, followed by an interview conducted by Baier with political newsmakers or pundits this sometimes includes the "Common Ground" segment, where a Democratic and Republican lawmaker come together to discuss legislation they're working on together. After the halfway point in the program, and after a short break for current headlines, Baier has a segment called "Outside the Beltway" where he reads headlines from FOX affiliates around the country. He also often presents a segment called "Beyond our Borders" where he reads headlines from stories around the world.

The best-known part of Special Report is Baier's discussion with "All Star Panel", a two-segment roundtable with a panel of three political reporters and columnists.

The program sometimes ends with a segment called "A Special Day" where Baier recognizes a historic anniversary or pays tribute to an important American. On Tuesdays, Baier ends with a segment called "Tuesday X'tras" (formerly "Tuesday Tweets") where he answers question asked on X (formerly known as Twitter) and at the end of the week, the show ends with a segment called "Notable Quotables" where the funny and significant quotes from the week are shown in a humorous fashion. Brit Hume would usually sign off with, "That's Special Report for this time, please tune us in next time, and in the meantime, more news is on the way — fair, balanced and unafraid." When Bret Baier became host, he signed off with, "Your source for news, tonight and every night," which he later changed to, "Straightforward news in uncertain times." As of June 2026, Baier uses Hume's classic "fair, balanced and unafraid" sign-off.

Fill in hosts for Baier include Mike Emanuel, Shannon Bream, Trace Gallagher, John Roberts, Gillian Turner and Bill Hemmer.

== "Fox All-Star" Panel members ==
- Brit Hume - Fox News senior political analyst
- Susan Page - Washington bureau chief for USA Today
- Ben Domenech - Fox News contributor, editor at large of The Spectator
- Mara Liasson - NPR national political correspondent
- Juan Williams - Fox News senior political analyst
- Charles Lane - Washington Post Staff Writer
- Trey Gowdy - Former South Carolina Congressman, host of Sunday Night in America with Trey Gowdy
- Katie Pavlich - Fox News contributor, editor at Townhall
- Harold Ford Jr. - Former Tennessee Congressman, co-host of The Five
- Shannon Bream - Host of Fox News Sunday
- Howard Kurtz - Host of Media Buzz
- Kimberley Strassel - Wall Street Journal columnist
- Jason L. Riley - Wall Street Journal writer
- Guy Benson - Host of The Guy Benson Radio Show
- Mollie Hemingway - Senior editor of The Federalist
- Byron York - Chief political correspondent for the Washington Examiner
- Kayleigh McEnany - Co-host of Outnumbered and former White House Press Secretary to President Donald Trump
- Charles Hurt - Washington Times writer, co-host of Fox & Friends Weekend
- Jennifer Griffin - Fox News Chief national security correspondent
- Jessica Tarlov - Democratic strategist, co-host of The Five
- Hugh Hewitt - Radio talk show host
- Leslie Marshall - Fox News contributor, radio talk show host
- Josh Kraushaar - Senior political correspondent for Axios
- Marc Thiessen - Washington Post writer, Fox News Contributor
- Olivia Beavers - Wall Street Journal Congressional Correspondent
- Dasha Burns- Politico White House Bureau Chief
- Philip Wegmann - The Wall Street Journal White House Correspondent
- Charles Krauthammer - Washington Post political columnist

== Program origins and changes/announcements ==
The show originated in 1996 and was originally hosted by Brit Hume, who was, at the time, Washington, D.C. managing editor for the network. Hume hosted the program through December 23, 2008, when he hosted his final show before officially stepping down as anchor. The last fifteen minutes of Hume's final program served as a tribute to Hume, including kind words from former president George H. W. Bush, then-president George W. Bush, then-vice president Dick Cheney, and then-ABC News anchor Charles Gibson, as well as several Fox News reporters, and allowed him some final thoughts. Hume announced Bret Baier, who substituted for Hume on Fridays beginning in fall 2007, would become the full-time host after the holidays, while Hume moved to a new role as senior political analyst for the network. Chris Wallace and Shannon Bream are occasional substitute anchors.

Brit Hume hosted the show from its debut in 1996 until his retirement in December 2008. He has since appeared on the program as a panelist commentator.

On June 15, 2009, the show launched in high definition with new music and graphics.

From its inception, Special Report has broadcast live from the network's Capitol Hill studio in Washington. However, on some occasions, such as the night of a significant election, the program will broadcast from the network's New York studios.

The program is among the top five of all ad-supported news shows on cable, and draws more than two million viewers per evening.

On January 13, 2020, the show launched new graphics and a new logo.

Preceded by The Five	Special Report w/ Bret Baier; 6:00 PM – 7:00 PM	Succeeded by The Ingraham Angle
