= Laurie Dhue =

American television journalist

- Born: February 10, 1969 (age 57); Greensboro, North Carolina, U.S.
- Education: The Westminster Schools; University of North Carolina at Chapel Hill
- Occupation: Television journalist

Laurie Walker Dhue (born February 10, 1969) is an American television journalist. She was a Fox News Channel anchor from 2000 to 2008, reporting for the television show Geraldo at Large and the host of Fox Report Weekend. Born in Chapel Hill, North Carolina, Laurie Dhue grew up in Atlanta, Georgia. Her mother is Hutton Dhue, and her father, Bob Dhue, was a former vice president of wrestling operations for World Championship Wrestling. Dhue graduated from the University of North Carolina at Chapel Hill. She received a Bachelor of Arts degree in political science with a concentration in dramatic arts.

== Career ==
Before joining Fox News in 2000, she worked for MSNBC as host of its Special Edition. She started at MSNBC in April 1999 as the anchor of Newsfront. She worked at CNN from 1990 to 1999, where she served as anchor for weekend programs, such as CNN Saturday, CNN Sunday, World View, and The World Today.

She interned as a weekend morning anchor for WSB-TV in Atlanta and did the occasional weekend edition of Today for NBC. She hosted Fox Report weekend edition and appeared weekly on The O'Reilly Factor. She also reported for Geraldo at Large, On the Record with Greta Van Susteren, and Fox Report with Shepard Smith. Dhue served as the voice of the official Fox News Radio launch in 2004 and anchored evening news updates for several years.

On March 30, 2011, she was the guest host of The Joy Behar Show on CNN's sister network, HLN. She was replaced by Frances Rivera on the WPIX-TV Morning News in New York City August 29, 2011.

Dhue began hosting For the Record on the new media channel 'TheBlaze' on March 13, 2013. On September 9, 2013, Dhue premiered as the evening anchor for TheBlaze TV News. Her last day with TheBlaze was April 17, 2015.

=== Alcoholism and activism ===
In February 2011, Dhue publicly admitted to a 15-year battle with alcoholism. She was successfully treated for her addiction and has since become a vocal spokesperson for the recovery movement. She has particularly advocated for the need for openness about the disease, the stigmas attached to those who are alcoholic, and the need for greater access to recovery options and programs. She performs public speaking at conventions, conferences, corporate events, and special events.

== Sexual harassment lawsuit ==
Dhue is one of many women who have settled suits with Fox News in sexual harassment claims against long-time anchor Bill O'Reilly and former president Roger Ailes. As of 2017, she was writing a book discussing her experience.
