= Phil Keating =

American news correspondent

Phillip Keating was a national correspondent for the Fox News Channel based in the Miami bureau. During his career at Fox, Keating has covered breaking news stories including the death of Anna Nicole Smith, Caylee Anthony, and the trial of Jose Padilla.

He covers NASA stories for Fox News, including NASA's Space Shuttle program, and the new Constellation program. Previously, he reported for the syndicated magazine show Geraldo Rivera on the Fox News channel-produced program Geraldo At Large. Before this, he was a correspondent in the Fox News Channel's Dallas bureau. Keating joined FOX after working at Denver's KUSA and KDVR.
