= Jane Skinner =

American news anchor and journalist

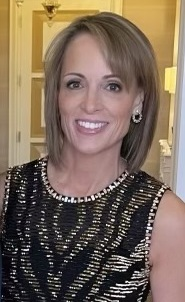
- Skinner in 2024
- Born: February 12, 1967 (age 59); Chicago, Illinois, U.S.
- Occupation: News anchor
- Spouse: Roger Goodell (m. 1997)
- Children: 2
- Father: Samuel K. Skinner

Jane Skinner (born February 12, 1967) is an American former daytime news anchor who worked for Fox News, co-hosting Happening Now with Jon Scott from 11 am to 1 pm ET. On June 24, 2010, she announced on-air her retirement from her daytime news anchor position at the end of her usual Happening Now segment, citing a desire to spend more time with her family. She is married to NFL Commissioner Roger Goodell.

== Early life ==
Jane Skinner was raised in Lake Forest, Illinois, and graduated from Lake Forest High School in 1985. Skinner received her bachelor's and master's degrees from the University of Illinois in Champaign, Illinois.

== Career ==
=== Broadcast journalism ===
Skinner began her career as a reporter for KBJR in Duluth, Minnesota, before working for WCSH in Portland, Maine. She left Portland in 1993 to become a reporter for KMOV in St. Louis. In January 1995, she became the weekend evening anchor for WITI in Milwaukee after that station became a Fox affiliate. At the time she married Goodell in 1997, she left Milwaukee to move to Manhattan.

After freelancing for WNBC, Skinner was hired by Fox News Channel as a correspondent and weekend anchor. Before co-anchoring Happening Now, Skinner hosted the 2 p.m. ET edition of Fox News Live and hosted a segment on Studio B called "Skinnerville". Prior to that she hosted Sunday Best, which featured highlights from the previous week's programming on the channel. She was also featured for a time on The Big Story with John Gibson. Skinner left Fox News in 2010.

=== Production ===
After departing Fox News, Skinner rarely made public statements.

Between 2019 and 2022, Skinner created three projects that highlighted women in the National Football League. She co-executive produced NFL Films's "A Lifetime of Sundays" - a documentary about four female NFL owners: Norma Hunt of the Kansas City Chiefs, Virginia Halas McCaskey of the Chicago Bears, Martha Ford of the Detroit Lions and Patricia Rooney of the Pittsburgh Steelers. She also co-produced the "Earnin' It: The NFL's Forward Progress" podcast and co-executive produced Peacock's five-part TV series about influential women in football with the same title. In 2024, Skinner worked with Peyton Manning's Omaha Productions to co-executive produce "The Buddy Way," a documentary on the life of visionary Dartmouth College football coach Buddy Teevens.

== Personal life ==
Her father is Sam Skinner, former Secretary of Transportation and White House Chief of Staff under President George H. W. Bush. On October 25, 1997, she married now-NFL Commissioner Roger Goodell. The two moved from Manhattan to Westchester, New York, in 2005 and have twin daughters.

In 2016, Skinner—a collector of contemporary art—was named to the board of the Dia Art Foundation. Skinner also serves on the board of the Women's Coaching Alliance.
