= Shannon Bream =

American journalist

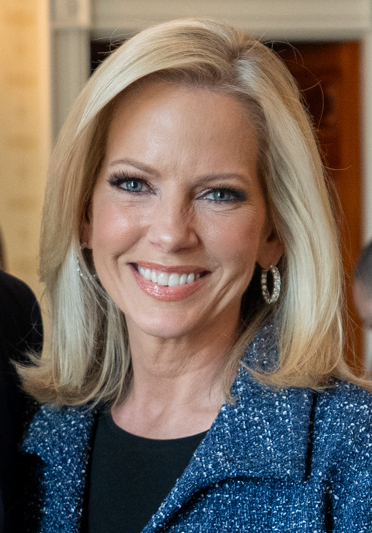
- Bream in 2025
- Born: Shannon Noelle DePuy; December 23, 1970 (age 55); Tallahassee, Florida, U.S.
- Education: Liberty University (BS); Florida State University (JD)
- Occupations: Television news anchor, reporter, attorney
- Employer: Fox News Media
- Spouse: Sheldon Bream (m. 1995)

Shannon Noelle Bream (née DePuy; born December 23, 1970) is an American journalist and attorney who is a host of Fox News Sunday on the Fox network and Fox News. She is also chief legal correspondent for the channel. In 2022, she became host of Fox News Sunday.

Prior to hosting Fox News Sunday, she was the host of Fox News @ Night for five years. She was also a former contestant in the Miss America 1991 and Miss USA 1995 pageants. She was a correspondent for News 12 Networks on Long Island in the 1990s.

== Early life and education ==
Bream was born and raised in Tallahassee, Florida, to Linda (née Evans; 1949–2006), a county clerk and law office manager, and police officer and former Leon County Commissioner Clarence Edward DePuy Jr. (1946–2013). She attended Liberty University in Lynchburg, Virginia, and, while there, won the pageant title Miss Virginia in 1990. She then participated and finished in the top 10 in the Miss America 1991 pageant, where she was awarded a scholarship award that covered much of her undergraduate education.

After graduating from Liberty University in 1993 with a business management degree magna cum laude, Bream attended Florida State University College of Law, where she interned with U.S. Congressman Bill McCollum, who was later elected Florida Attorney General. While at law school at Florida State, she won the Miss Florida USA pageant in 1995 and placed fourth in the Miss USA 1995 pageant, which paid for her law school education.

== Career ==
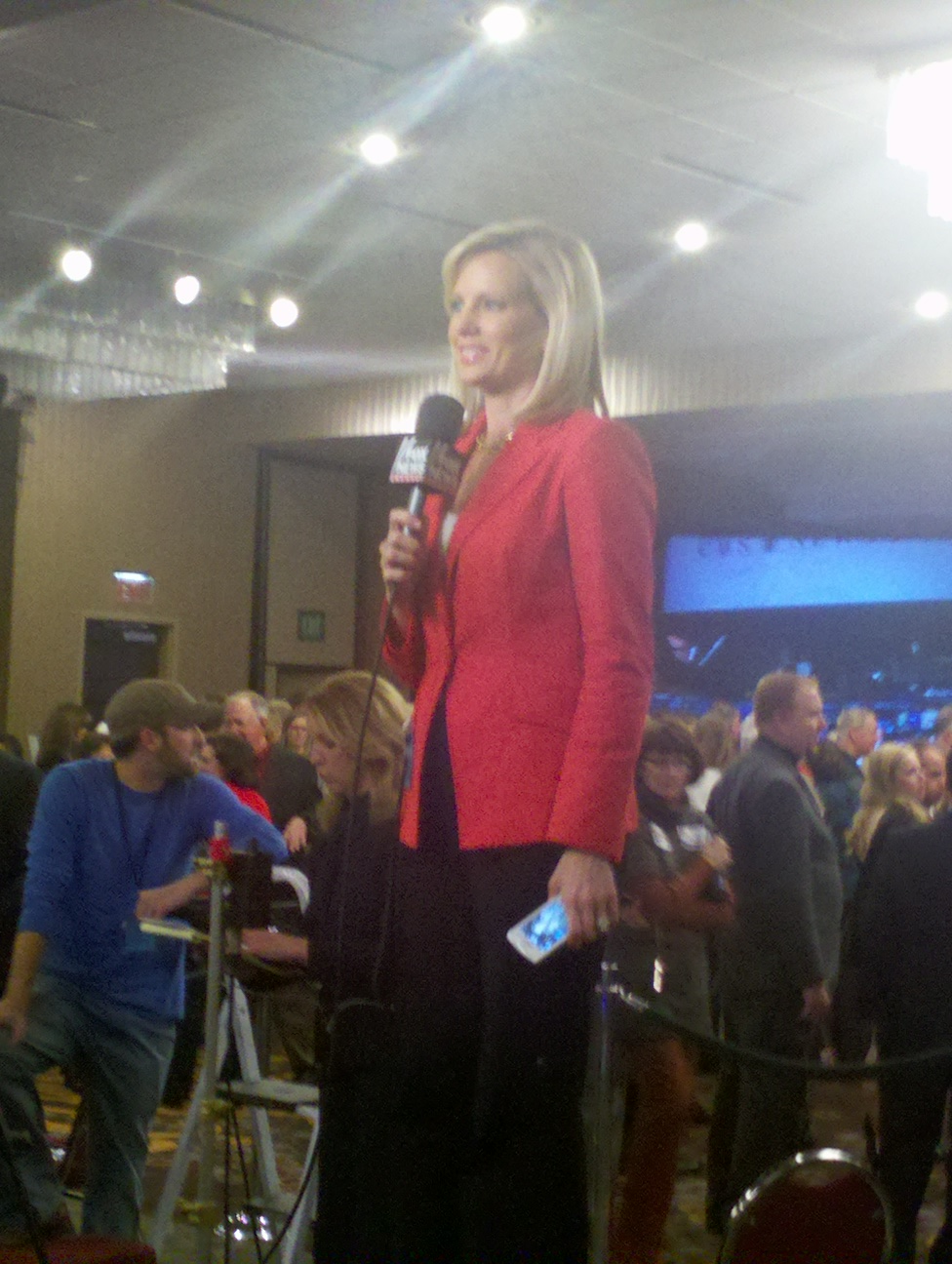
Bream reporting on the Iowa elections in 2012

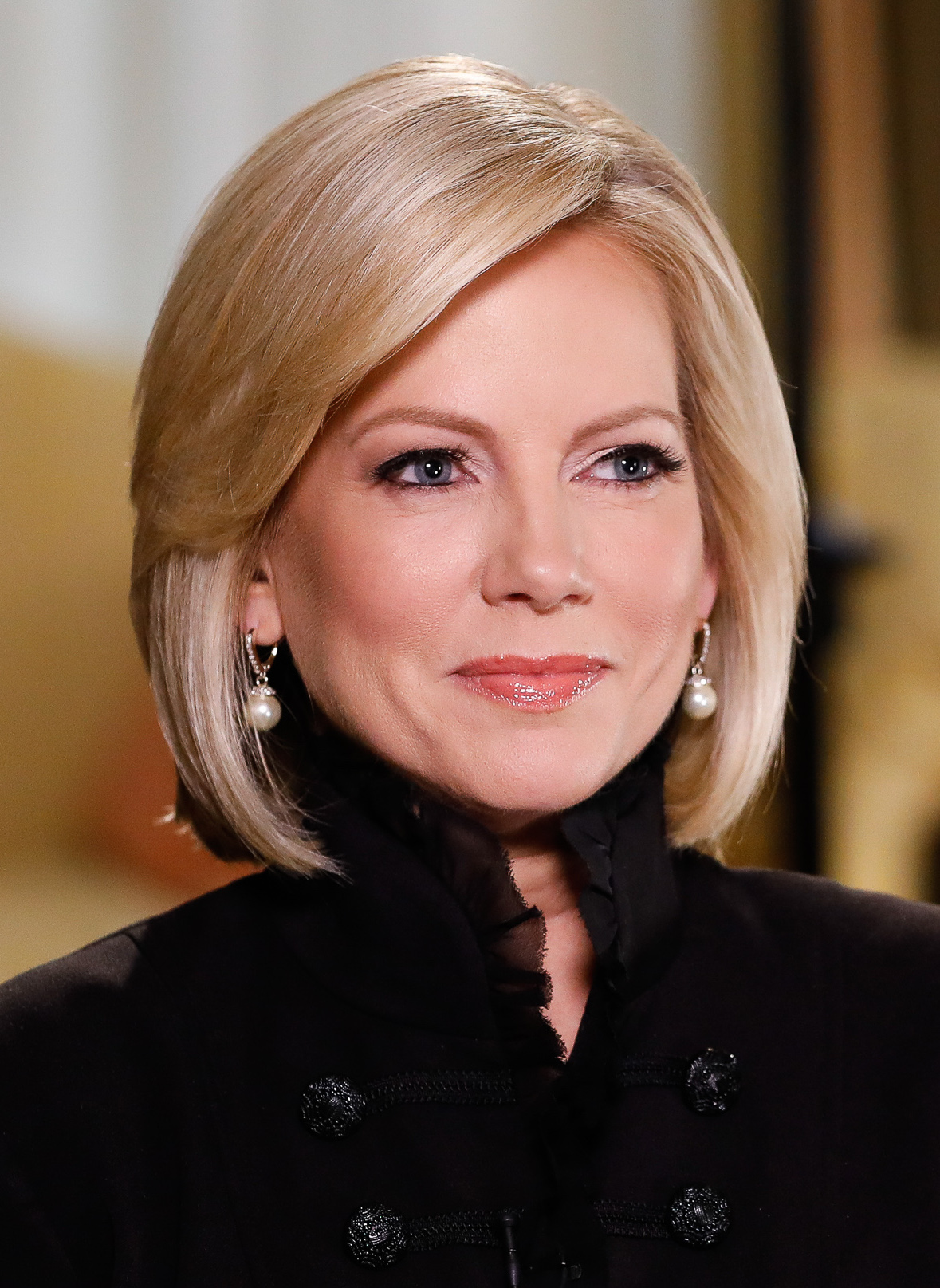
Bream in 2019

After graduating with a JD degree with honors from Florida State University College of Law in 1996, Bream moved to Tampa, Florida, where she began her career as a lawyer specializing in race discrimination and sexual harassment.

In 2001, she transitioned to television journalism, becoming the evening and late-night news reporter for WBTV in Charlotte, North Carolina. In 2004, after three years at WBTV, Bream joined Washington D.C.'s NBC affiliate WRC-TV. At WRC-TV, she was a weekend anchor and covered general assignments.

While at WRC-TV, Bream met Brit Hume, who was the managing editor of Fox News's Washington, D.C. bureau. With Hume's encouragement, she submitted audition tapes to Fox News. Bream joined Fox News in November 2007, and was based in the network's Washington, D.C. bureau. She then became the anchor/host of Fox News @ Night.

On August 11, 2022, it was announced that Bream would replace Chris Wallace as Fox News Sunday's new anchor, beginning September 11, 2022.

In addition to hosting Fox News Sunday, Bream appears periodically on other Fox News programs, including America's Newsroom, Outnumbered, America Reports, The Story with Martha MacCallum, The Five, Special Report and Gutfeld! as a guest and as a substitute host.

Bream is the author of three books: Finding the Bright Side: The Art of Chasing What Matters, The Women of the Bible Speak: The Wisdom of 16 Women and Their Lessons for Today, and The Mothers and Daughters of the Bible Speak: Lessons on Faith from Nine Biblical Families. The book The Women of the Bible Speak: The Wisdom of 16 Women and Their Lessons for Today reached the number one spot on The New York Times Best Seller list.

== Personal life ==
Bream is a Christian and is trained as a classical pianist. Bream's husband, Sheldon Bream, has a company that connects event planners with speakers, and is a brain tumor survivor. They have no children as she believes she was called by God not to have children and concentrate on her career.
