= Strange Inheritance =

- Genre: Docu-series
- Presented by: Jamie Colby
- Country of origin: United States
- Original language: English
- No. of seasons: 4
- No. of episodes: 104

Production
- Executive producers: Brian Gaffney; Jonathan Towers
- Camera setup: Multiple
- Running time: 30 minutes
- Production company: Towers Productions

Original release
- Network: Fox Business Network
- Release: January 26, 2015 – April 19, 2018

Strange Inheritance is an American television docu-series which airs on Fox Business Network. The series examines unusual inheritances and the stories behind them. The series is produced by Towers Productions and hosted by Jamie Colby and premiered on 26 January 2015.

The back-to-back premiere of the first two episodes of the series was the highest rating launch in the channel's history at the time, with 289,000 and 315,000 viewers respectively.

== Broadcast ==
The first season debuted on January 26, 2015. The series was renewed for a second season which began on November 11, 2015. A third season premiered on January 20, 2017. A fourth season aired on January 15, 2018.

== Episodes ==
Season	Episodes	Originally released	
Season	Episodes	First released	Last released
1	26	January 26, 2015	April 13, 2015
2	24	November 11, 2015	February 15, 2016
3	28	January 20, 2017	April 24, 2017
4	26	January 15, 2018	April 9, 2018
