= Cavuto Live =

- Genre: Business analysis programming
- Presented by: Neil Cavuto
- Country of origin: United States
- Original language: English
- No. of seasons: 6

Production
- Production location: New York City
- Running time: 120 minutes

Original release
- Network: Fox News Channel
- Release: January 20, 2018 – December 14, 2024

Cavuto Live was a two-hour weekend news program focusing on the intersection of business and politics on Fox News. It was hosted by Neil Cavuto and debuted on January 20, 2018.

On replacing the long-running Cost of Freedom block, Cavuto said in a press release "now, with the news often hitting throughout the weekend, we owe it to our viewers to provide real-time reaction on just how these policies and politics impact our lives, and our finances. As I have always said, it's not about the red or the blue, it's about the green and I am excited to bring our audience a new, live, two-hour program that delivers the vital news and analysis our viewers need in this ever-changing political and economic landscape."

On December 19, 2024 it was announced that Cavuto would be leaving Fox News after 28 years on air after declining to accept a new contract from Fox. Rotating hosts helmed the 10 am-12 pm time slot from December 2024 through September 2025 until Saturday in America with Kayleigh McEnany was named as the permanent replacement on September 20, 2025.

Preceded by Fox & Friends Weekend	Cavuto Live; 10:00 am ET – 12:00 pm ET	Succeeded by Fox News Live
