= The Live Desk (American TV program) =

- Title banner
- Genre: News/Talk program
- Presented by: Martha MacCallum; Trace Gallagher (2008–2010)
- Country of origin: United States
- Original language: English

Production
- Production location: New York City
- Camera setup: Multi-camera
- Running time: 120 minutes

Original release
- Network: Fox News Channel
- Release: September 25, 2006 – January 29, 2010

Related
- DaySide, Fox News Live; Fox News Live

The Live Desk is an American news and talk program that aired on the Fox News Channel. It was cancelled and replaced with America Live with Megyn Kelly.

== About the show ==
Airing each weekday at 1:00 p.m. ET, it focused on the main news stories of the day the network was following, mostly through live correspondents and pre-taped video, in addition to breaking news. This show originally aired as a one-hour program when it debuted on September 25, 2006.

Compared to the network's main news programming, half the program aired from one of the network's control rooms, the other half airing from Studio D. The second half also featured a panel, named the A-list, with a special guest panelist, labeled the Wildcard.

Hosted by Martha MacCallum, the program replaced DaySide, which ended on September 22, 2006, due to its hosts leaving the network to begin The Morning Show with Mike and Juliet for Fox.

== Revamp ==
On June 10, 2008, Fox News announced that the show would expand to two hours, with the second hour replacing America's Pulse with E. D. Hill, from June 16. Trace Gallagher joined the program as a co-host.

On May 28, 2009, The Live Desk launched in high definition with new graphics, new music, and the use of HD ready Studio J.
