= Marianne Rafferty =

American television journalist

- Born: Marianne Michelle Silber; September 19, 1971 (age 54); Fort Worth, Texas, U.S.
- Education: Bellarmine University
- Occupations: News anchor & correspondent
- Employer: Tribune Broadcasting - KFOR Oklahoma City
- Spouse: Ian Rafferty
- Children: 2

Marianne Michelle Rafferty (née Silber; born September 19, 1971) is an overnight anchor and correspondent for Fox News. She joined FNC in 2006 as a correspondent based in Fox's Atlanta bureau. While based in Atlanta, Rafferty covered Hurricane Dean's path from Jamaica and also reported on the Duke lacrosse case.

On September 2, 2016, Marianne Rafferty announced during the 5:00 p.m. broadcast she was leaving KFOR in Oklahoma City and moving to the west coast to be closer to her family.

== Biography ==
Rafferty was raised on a ranch in Beeville, Texas. Her father is a retired Air Force Veteran.

Rafferty studied at Bellarmine University in Louisville, Kentucky. Her first job out of college was at KZTV-TV in Corpus Christi, Texas. She then worked at the ABC station in Oklahoma City for three years. In 2006, she joined the Fox News Channel (FNC) in 2006 as a special correspondent in the Atlanta, Georgia bureau. She moved to Fox's New York bureau in late 2009, becoming an overnight anchor and correspondent.

In April 2015, she returned to KFOR-TV in Oklahoma City anchoring the 4:00, 5:00, and 6:30 PM newscasts. In September 2016, she returned to the Fox News Channel.

On May 30, 2009, she married Ian "Will" Rafferty in her hometown. They have a son, born in early 2012.
