= Sandra Smith (reporter) =

American television reporter (born 1980)

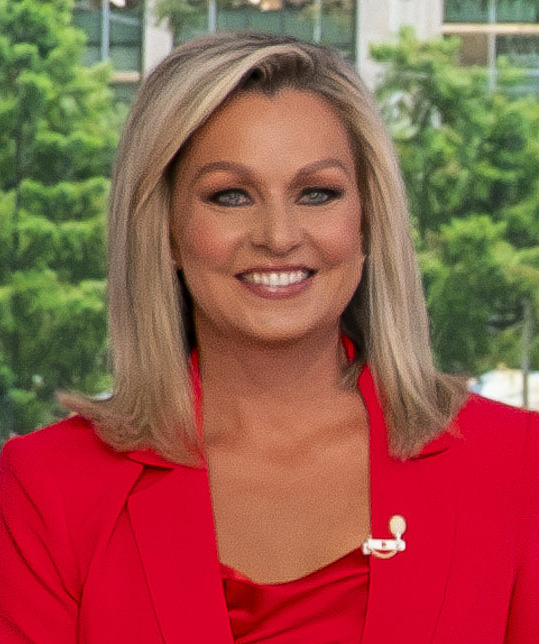
- Smith in 2025
- Born: Sandra Kaye Smith; September 22, 1980 (age 46); Chicago, Illinois, U.S.
- Education: Illinois State University; Louisiana State University
- Occupations: Television host, anchor, reporter for Fox News and Fox Business
- Spouse: John Connelly
- Children: 2

Sandra Kaye Smith (born on September 22, 1980) is an American business and news reporter currently serving as co-anchor of America Reports on the Fox News Channel (FNC) in New York City. She is originally from Wheaton, Illinois, and ran track and field while an undergraduate at Louisiana State University.

== Early life ==
Smith is a native of Wheaton, Illinois, a western suburb of Chicago. Smith graduated from Wheaton Warrenville South High School in 1998. She earned three letters in cross country and two letters in track at Wheaton Warrenville South, where she was the cross country team captain as a senior. She was an Illinois High School Association state qualifier, earned All-DuPage Valley Conference honors, and was an Academic All-Conference selection.

== College ==
Smith attended Illinois State University in Bloomington-Normal for a time before transferring to Louisiana State University (LSU) in Baton Rouge for the 2002 school year. She ran the 1,500 meters, mile, 3,000 meters and steeplechase at various LSU and LSU Alumni track-and-field events.

Smith graduated from LSU, with a degree in journalism, and a minor in speech. Smith's father was a floor trader at Chicago's Mercantile Exchange and many of Sandra's relatives worked in Chicago's financial district.

== Career ==
Smith began her business career as a research associate at Aegis Capital Group. There, she assisted in the research and analysis of retail stocks, prepared weekly stock newsletters to clients, and identified investment opportunities. Her next employment was as a trader at Hermitage Capital Corporation in New York City, where she executed U.S. equities and options orders, conducted portfolio analysis, and prepared commission reports. From there, Smith moved on to be the director of institutional sales and trading at Terra Nova Institutional in Chicago, where she handled investment management and hedge fund accounts. She also assisted in the development of program trading models for existing and prospective clients.

She broke into television as an on-air reporter for Bloomberg Television. In this role, she covered U.S. equities and derivatives markets, contributed to breaking news and analysis, and reported for Bloomberg Press.

She joined Fox Business as a reporter in October 2007, with the launch of the network, and can be seen on many FBN shows. Beginning in early October 2009, she was a regular on Don Imus' show, Imus in the Morning. She was a frequent guest on Fox Business Happy Hour and has appeared as a guest on the Fox News late-night satire program Red Eye w/ Greg Gutfeld.

In April 2014, Smith began co-hosting Outnumbered on the Fox News Channel featuring four Fox News female commentators and one rotating male guest discussing current news and cultural topics. Previously, Smith served as co-anchor of the Fox News morning news program, America's Newsroom. She is co-anchor with John Roberts of Fox News America Reports on weekdays beginning at 1PM ET. The program involves discussions of prominent issues, as well as afternoon headlines, with experts and newsmakers.
