= Your World with Neil Cavuto =

American news and business television program

- Genre: Business; News; Talk show
- Presented by: Neil Cavuto (1996–2024); Rotating hosts (2024–2025)
- Country of origin: United States
- Original language: English
- No. of seasons: 28

Production
- Production locations: New York City, New York, U.S.
- Camera setup: Multi-camera
- Running time: 60 minutes

Original release
- Network: Fox News Channel
- Release: October 7, 1996 – January 17, 2025

Your World (known as Your World with Neil Cavuto from 1996–2024) is an American television news and business talk show on Fox News Channel. Episodes aired live at 4 p.m. ET, Monday through Friday. The show focused on the development of the markets and the day's events with interviews, current event updates, and analysis. The show was part of the Fox News program lineup from October 7, 1996, to January 17, 2025.

On December 19, 2024, it was announced that Cavuto would be leaving Fox News after 28 years on air.

On January 13, 2025, it was announced that Your World would officially end its run on January 17, 2025, and will be replaced by The Will Cain Show hosted by Fox News personality Will Cain.

== Production history ==
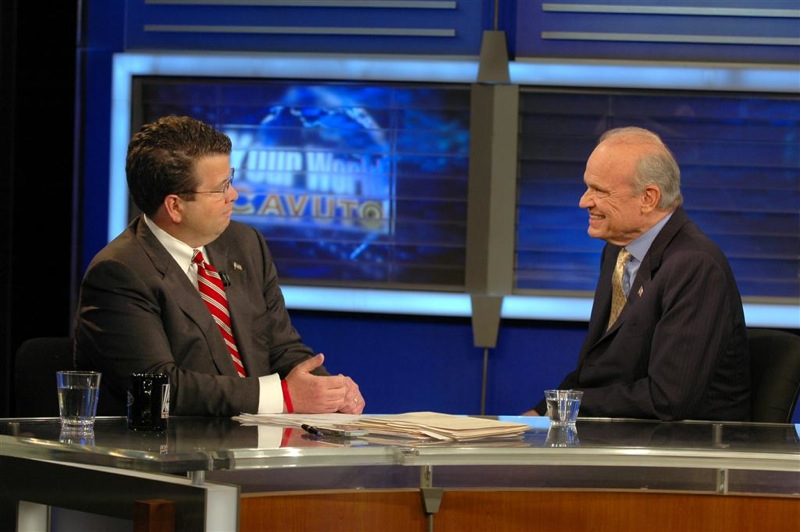
Cavuto interviewing Fred Thompson in October 2007

The program covers the latest breaking news and business stories of the day, in addition to giving analysis on how the stock market moved through the day. It also covers political stories, such as how political actions may affect the markets. Your World is broadcast live from Studio G at 1211 Avenue of the Americas (also known as the News Corp. Building), New York City. In the past, the program was presented in Studio E.

Your World began broadcasting in 720p HD September 28, 2009. This HD conversion was part of FNC's network-wide switch to a 16:9 widescreen format on that day. Also on September 28, 2009, this program (which was one of the last existing weekday programs to convert to HD) debuted a new on-air look, along with new graphics and a then-new program logo.

On December 19, 2024, it was announced that Cavuto would be leaving Fox News after 28 years on air after declining to accept a new contract with lesser pay from the network.

== Recurring elements ==
- Common Sense - Cavuto gives his point of view on a news story of the day.
- Generation Hexed - Cavuto sits down with a group of millennials to talk about the economic challenges facing the next generation.
- Mailing It It - Cavuto reads e-mails and social media posts from the viewers, majority of which are negative.

Preceded by The Story with Martha MacCallum	Your World; 4:00 PM – 5:00 PM	Succeeded by The Five
