= Fox Report =

- Also known as: Fox News Report (1997–1999)
- Genre: News program
- Presented by: Jon Scott (2018–present)
- Country of origin: United States
- Original language: English
- No. of seasons: 24

Production
- Production locations: Fox News Headquarters, New York City, New York, U.S.
- Camera setup: Multi-camera
- Running time: 120 minutes
- Production company: Fox News

Original release
- Network: Fox News ChannelFox
- Release: September 13, 1999 – present

Related
- The Schneider Report (1996–1997)

The Fox Report is an American afternoon television news program on Fox News and Fox Broadcasting Company, which debuted on September 13, 1999, as a seven-night-a-week broadcast with Shepard Smith as main anchor of the program until it was relegated to weekends only after the October 4, 2013 broadcast. Since June 16, 2018, the Fox Report has been anchored by Jon Scott.

Fox Report is broadcast live on Saturday and Sunday afternoons from 3:00 P.M. to 5:00 P.M.

Guest hosts for the program include Molly Line, Bill Melugin, Bryan Llenas and Christine Coleman.

== Overview ==
The program is described as Fox News Channel's "newscast of record" and utilizes a similar story length and pacing as competing evening news programs aired by the Big Three broadcast television networks (ABC World News Tonight, CBS Evening News, and NBC Nightly News). It is the highest-rated newscast among the United States cable news channels, averaging about 1.5 million viewers per broadcast – far less than even the lowest-rated broadcast network newscast (CBS at 6.5 million).

The program features Fox News correspondents and guests analyzing issues in shorter-form segments, which typically run no more than three or four minutes per story. Up to 70 stories are covered within each broadcast. The program eschews the use of "talking heads", and focuses on field reporting and comments from individuals directly involved in the story. One common feature is "Around the World in 80 Seconds" (a play on the Jules Verne novel Around the World in Eighty Days), a segment taking a quick look at interesting stories from around the world. "Across America" is a similarly formatted segment – albeit not subject to time restrictions – which features human interest stories culled from local newscasts seen on affiliates of the Fox broadcast network.

The Fox Report was rebroadcast at 2:00 a.m. Eastern Time weeknights from the program's debut until the late-night airing was replaced by the comedy/news commentary show Red Eye on February 6, 2007. In lieu of a national news program (other than the political talk show Fox News Sunday) on the Fox network or local news programming on the service itself at the time of its launch, the program was also simulcast on Foxnet (a national cable feed of the Fox network distributed to markets without access to a local Fox station) from 1996 (at the program's inception as The Schneider Report) until Foxnet ceased operations on September 12, 2006.

== History ==
=== Early history ===
When Fox News Channel launched on October 7, 1996, the network debuted its first "regular" evening newscast, The Schneider Report. Anchored by former NBC News and ABC News correspondent Mike Schneider, the program included interviews with guests and was kept as close to center in terms of its political coverage as possible.

=== Format change as the Fox Report ===
Fox Report logo from 2005 to 2007.

After Schneider left FNC in 1997, the program was reformatted as the Fox News Report, with Jon Scott and Catherine Crier taking over as co-anchors. At its start, the Fox Report aired on Monday through Friday evenings. After Crier left FNC to become a host/correspondent for Court TV (now truTV) and Scott was subsequently removed as an anchor, Paula Zahn became the solo anchor of the program, then retitled as the Fox Report with Paula Zahn. Zahn anchored the newscast until she became host of The Edge later that year, at which point Shepard Smith was named the program's main anchor and its title amended as simply the Fox Report. This marked the first incarnation of what would become the flashy, fast-paced newscast it evolved into under Smith's tenure. In particular, Smith started the trend of peppering news scripts with participles instead of using complete sentences.

Shortly after the September 11th attacks in 2001, Fox News Channel added editions of the program on Saturday and Sunday evenings, expanding the Fox Report to seven nights a week. Rick Folbaum served as the original anchor of the Saturday broadcasts, he later added the Sunday editions to his duties and became substitute for Smith on the weeknight editions until Folbaum left FNC in early 2006, when he was replaced by Trace Gallagher, who himself anchored the weekend editions until he was reassigned by FNC in 2007 to become the program's chief correspondent. Laurie Dhue, who was the original anchor of the program's Sunday edition from 2001 to 2005, returned to the program as anchor of both the Saturday and Sunday broadcasts until she departed FNC in 2008, Dhue was then succeeded on the weekend broadcasts by Julie Banderas.

Fox Report logo from 2007 to 2009.

Throughout 2007, the program shifted toward a more serious tone, removing pre-break story teasers, jokes, and a number of other elements, including the "G-Block", a segment featuring mostly entertainment and celebrity news (which became notable for an incident in November 2002 that eventually went viral in which Shepard Smith made a slip of the tongue during a story on Jennifer Lopez, mistakenly stating that residents from the Bronx neighborhood where the actress/singer grew up would rather give her a "curb job than a blow job, er... a bl-block party" if she returned there).

On September 24, 2007, the program relocated to Studio E, an elaborate, state-of-the-art set (which is also used by fellow FNC shows Fox & Friends and Your World with Neil Cavuto) which incorporates LED and plasma projection screens, the program introduced a new music and graphics package. However, the weekend editions of the program continued to be produced from Fox News' main studio. On December 10, 2008, the program moved again to Studio 12H, a set designed for high-definition broadcasts that was first used for the Fox News-produced 2008 Election Night coverage on the Fox broadcast network, with "The Cube" – a large video display object featuring display of imagery on three facets of the cube – as a major element, both the weekday and weekend broadcasts were produced out of the new studio. The Fox Report debuted a new on-air look on September 28, 2009, which included new graphics and a remix of the previous theme music. In early 2011, Harris Faulkner took over as the program's weekend anchor, a move made long-term on April 25, 2011.

Fox Report logo from 2009 to October 9, 2011.

On October 10, 2011, the Fox Report (and its sister program, Studio B) introduced a new graphics package incorporating a lower-third graphics set mirroring that previously rolled out on two other Fox News shows, The Five and Happening Now. Shepard Smith presented the show from a modified Studio 12H that featured additional monitors as well as "The Cube," although the overhead platform and accompanying staircase (which had been part of the set since 2008) were removed.

During the week of September 26, 2011 to October 2, 2011, the Fox Report moved back into its former Studio E (with Studio B being moved into the newsroom), while renovations on Studio 8H were ongoing; both the Fox Report and Studio B were moved into a new set at the studio on October 10, 2011.

=== Relegation to weekends ===
On September 12, 2013, Fox News announced that it would cut the weeknight editions of the Fox Report and in order to make room for On the Record w/ Greta Van Susteren, which would be displaced from its longtime 10:00 p.m. Eastern time slot to make room for The Kelly File when that program debuted on October 7, 2013. In addition, as part of a new multi-year contract with Fox News Channel the day of the announcement of the evening schedule realignment, FNC also announced that Shepard Smith would be reassigned to serve as managing editor of its new breaking news division (under which capacity, Smith would serve as primary anchor of the network's breaking news coverage), while remaining as its chief news anchor and anchor of his mid-afternoon news program (which was retitled from Studio B to Shepard Smith Reporting). Smith anchored his last edition of the Fox Report on the day of the announcement, with the weeknight editions being anchored by substitutes until the program was relegated exclusively to weekends after the October 4, 2013 edition.

On May 12, 2014, FNC announced that it would return to a separate anchor format for the Fox Report's weekend broadcasts, with Julie Banderas returning to the program as anchor of the Saturday edition; Harris Faulkner would retain her role as anchor of the Sunday editions (her removal from the Saturday broadcasts was the result of her being named co-host of FNC's weekday panel talk show Outnumbered). Banderas initially served as one of three rotating anchors of the Saturday broadcast, along with John Roberts and Shannon Bream, before becoming sole anchor later in the year.

On January 13, 2025, it was announced that the show would be moving to the 3 p.m. to 5 p.m. time-slot beginning on January 18.

== Former anchors ==
- 1996–1997: Mike Schneider weeknight anchor of The Schneider Report
- 1997–1999: Jon Scott and Catherine Crier weeknight co-anchors
- 1999: Paula Zahn weeknight anchor
- 1999–2001: Shepard Smith weeknight anchor
- 2001–2005: Shepard Smith weeknight anchor, Rick Folbaum Saturday anchor, Laurie Dhue Sunday anchor
- 2005–2006: Shepard Smith weeknight anchor, Rick Folbaum weekend anchor
- 2006–2007: Shepard Smith weeknight anchor, Trace Gallagher weekend anchor
- 2007–2008: Shepard Smith weeknight anchor, Laurie Dhue weekend anchor
- 2008–2011: Shepard Smith weeknight anchor, Julie Banderas weekend anchor
- 2011–2013: Shepard Smith weeknight anchor, Harris Faulkner weekend anchor, Trace Gallagher fill-in anchor
- 2013–2014: Harris Faulkner weekend anchor
- 2014–2017: Julie Banderas Saturday anchor, Harris Faulkner Sunday anchor
- 2017–2018: Julie Banderas Saturday anchor, Molly Line Saturday anchor (alternating), Rick Leventhal Sunday anchor

Preceded by The Journal Editorial Report (Saturday); Fox News Sunday (Sunday)	Fox Report w/ Jon Scott; 3:00 PM ET – 5:00 PM ET	Succeeded by The Big Weekend Show
