= Jon Scott =

American television news anchor

- Born: Jonathan Arthur Scott; November 7, 1958 (age 67); Denver, Colorado, U.S.
- Education: University of Missouri at Columbia
- Occupation: Television news anchor
- Employer: Fox Entertainment Group
- Spouse(s): Sharon Scott (div. 2011); Michelle Deller Scott (2025)
- Children: 4

Jonathan Arthur Scott (born November 7, 1958) is an American television news anchor who hosts Fox Report Weekend on Fox News. Also, Scott is the lead anchor for any breaking news each weekend. Jon Scott longtime co-anchored Happening Now on Fox News until the network expanded America's Newsroom from 2 hours to 3, ending the show in June 2018 after 11 years of being on air. Scott was also the host of Fox News Watch, a program that in September 2013 was replaced by the similar format Media Buzz, which was hosted by Howard Kurtz.

== Early life and education ==
Scott was born in Denver, Colorado, and graduated from Denver Lutheran High School. He studied journalism at the University of Missouri–Columbia.

== Career ==
Scott began his career as a correspondent for KOMU-TV (NBC) in Columbia, Missouri, a station owned and operated by the University of Missouri. Later, he was the weekday evening news anchor, weekend co-anchor, and reporter for WPLG-TV (ABC) in Miami. He also worked as a reporter and bureau chief for KUSA-TV (NBC) in Denver. Beginning in 1988, Scott was a reporter for the syndicated news program Inside Edition.

From 1992 to 1995 Scott was a correspondent for Dateline NBC. He served as the host of A Current Affair and eventually joined the Fox News Channel in 1996. He is an avid watcher of The MacNeil/Lehrer NewsHour. Scott was hosting Fox News Live during the September 11 attacks and was the person to suggest on air that the attacks may have been perpetrated by Osama bin Laden. Scott was training to be an airplane pilot at the time, and studied the Bojinka plot, a joint cooperation of Ramzi Yousef with bin Laden that had resulted in one death and ten injured on an airline flight. Scott was able to trace the timeline of the Bojinka plot and what was happening in the United States at the time, allowing him to call out the potential it was a bin Laden plot.

On May 1 and 2, 2011, he served as the studio anchor for Fox News' coverage of Operation Neptune Spear, the mission in which bin Laden was killed by American forces.

Scott received an Emmy for news writing for the NBC program Dateline.

== Personal life ==
Scott is a certificated pilot, rated to fly single- and multi-engine airplanes, and sometimes uses his expertise when covering aviation stories, such as the July 6, 2013, crash of Asiana Airlines Flight 214.

Scott has four children. One son is in the army after graduating from the United States Military Academy in 2011. His older brother was an infantryman in the Vietnam War.

On September 1, 2025, Scott married Michelle Deller.
