= The Story with Martha MacCallum =

US television news/talk program

- Also known as: The First 100 Days
- Genre: News/Talk program
- Presented by: Martha MacCallum
- Country of origin: United States
- Original language: English
- No. of seasons: 9

Production
- Production locations: New York City (primary); Washington, D.C. (on location)
- Camera setup: Multi-camera
- Running time: 60 minutes

Original release
- Network: Fox News
- Release: January 16, 2017 – present

The Story with Martha MacCallum, known as The Story, is an American television news/talk program on Fox News Channel hosted by Martha MacCallum. Episodes air live from 3 p.m. ET/2 p.m. CT on Monday through Friday. The show has been a part of the Fox News program lineup since January 9, 2017. In January 2021, the program moved from 7PM to the 3PM hour. Fill-in hosts for MacCallum include Trace Gallagher, Harris Faulkner, Gillian Turner, and Shannon Bream.

== History ==
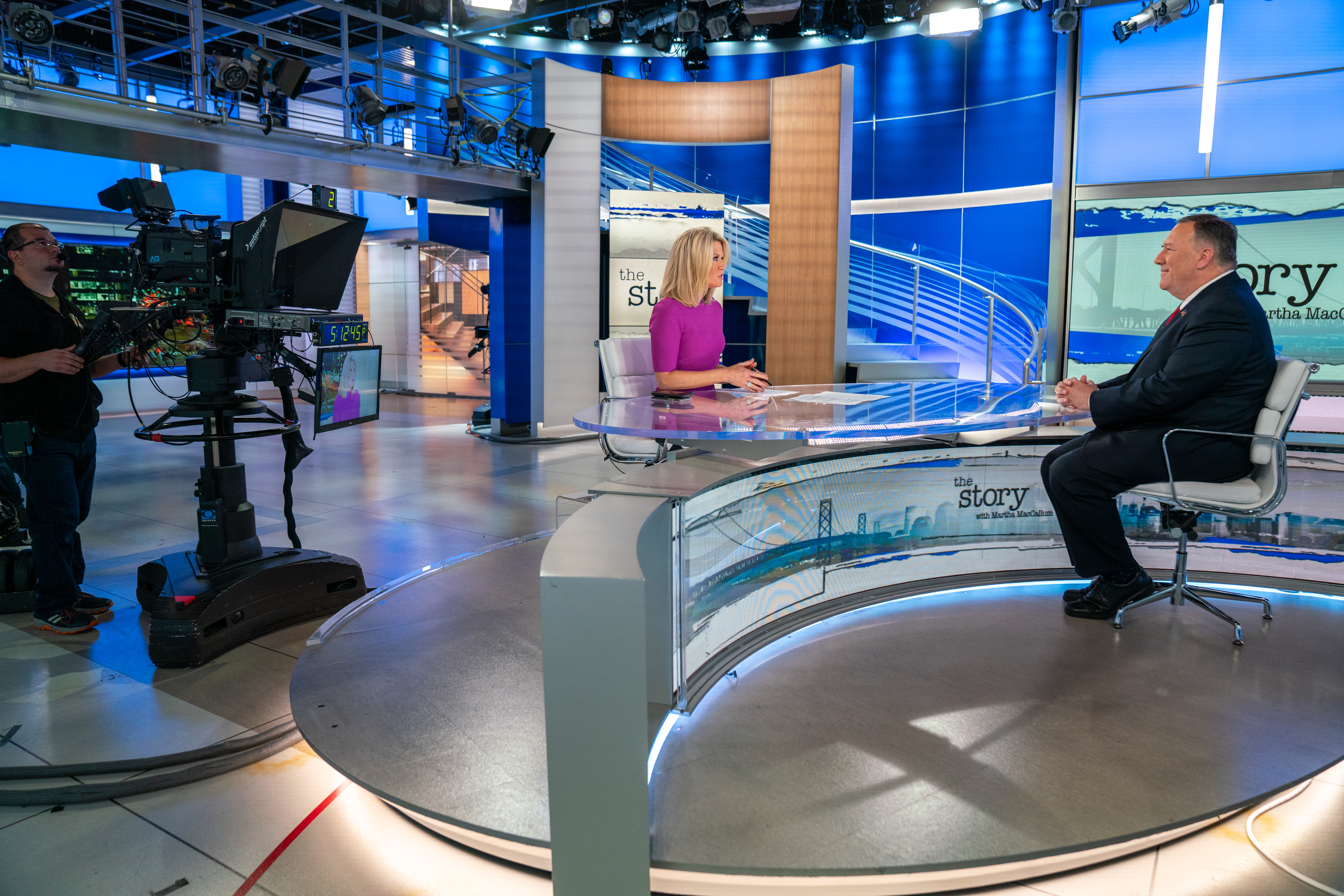
MacCullum interviews Secretary of State Mike Pompeo in October 2019

The show debuted under the title The First 100 Days with the premise of chronicling the presidential transition and beginning of the administration of Donald Trump. The show was renamed to reflect the end of the Trump administration's first hundred days on May 1, 2017, now focusing on a more broad news format with news analysis and interviews.

The Story with Martha MacCallum is broadcast from Studio F at 1211 Avenue of the Americas (also known as the News Corp. Building), New York City.

In January 2021, the program moved from 7PM to the 3PM hour, opening the 7PM hour to an opinion-based program called Fox News Primetime. In January 2022 Jesse Watters was named the permanent host of the hour with a new show called Jesse Watters Primetime.

== Ratings ==
In the first month it aired, the show averaged 3.5 million viewers, up 79% compared to On the Record with Greta Van Susteren, which had occupied the same time slot the year prior. Since then, the program has averaged approximately three million viewers. In late 2020 and early 2021, ratings were around one million viewers.

Preceded by America Reports w/ John Roberts & Sandra Smith	The Story w/ Martha MacCallum; 3:00 PM – 4:00 PM	Succeeded by The Will Cain Show
