= America's Newsroom =

- Genre: News/talk program
- Presented by: Bill Hemmer; Dana Perino
- Country of origin: United States
- Original language: English
- No. of seasons: 19

Production
- Production locations: New York City, New York, U.S.
- Camera setup: Multi-camera
- Running time: 180 minutes

Original release
- Network: Fox News Channel
- Release: February 12, 2007 – present

America's Newsroom is an American television hard news program on Fox News Channel currently hosted by Bill Hemmer and Dana Perino live from 9 a.m. - 11 a.m. on Monday through Friday.

The show focuses on the development of the day's events with interviews, current event updates, and political analysis. The show has been a part of the Fox News program lineup since February 12, 2007, and is the number one cable news broadcast in its time slot.

The program is one of FNC's eight current straight news programs, with the others being Fox News Live, Special Report with Bret Baier, America Reports, The Faulkner Focus, Fox Report, Fox & Friends First, The Story with Martha MacCallum and Fox News @ Night.

Substitute hosts include Mike Emanuel, Aishah Hasnie, Gillian Turner, Shannon Bream, Trace Gallagher, Julie Banderas, Martha MacCallum, Jacqui Heinrich and Sandra Smith.

== Hosts ==
=== Current hosts ===
- Bill Hemmer (2007—2020, 2021–present), founding anchor of the program and former Host of Bill Hemmer Reports
- Dana Perino (2021–present), co-host of The Five and former White House press secretary

=== Former hosts ===
- Megyn Kelly – moved to America Live which debuted on the same day
- Martha MacCallum – left America's Newsroom on January 16, 2017, to host The First 100 Days
- Shannon Bream – left to host Fox News @ Night which started on October 30, 2017 (Sandra Smith replaced Bream on October 2, 2017)
- Ed Henry – suspended on June 25, 2020, and fired on July 1, 2020 (following an allegation of sexual misconduct)
- Sandra Smith – left to co-host America Reports with John Roberts beginning January 18, 2021 (Dana Perino replaced Smith on January 18, 2021)

== Synopsis ==
Derived from one of the network's slogans, the show features general news coverage, which is divided between two general categories, either originating from the National Desk or World Desk. The program also features a number of discussions on issues currently in the news, commonly forming a panel of two to three to come onto the program to give separate viewpoints, pulled together by questions asked by the hosts to help inform the viewers on the points of views on the issue at hand.

== Recurring segments ==
- "The A-Team – three Fox News contributors offer political analysis of the day's events and topics
- "The Headliner" – a high-profile official (usually in government) is interviewed by both hosts about the day's current events
- "24/7 Crew" – featuring hosts from Fox News Headlines 24/7 to discuss the day's current events
- "Dana Read's Sports" - Sports news read by Dana Perino.

== Programming announcements/changes ==
On March 23, 2009, America's Newsroom began broadcasting in high definition and moved to Studio J, the Election Night 2008 set used by the Fox News Channel.

March 20, 2018, the show debuted Studio N, overlooking the Newsroom. It was stated that the move was temporary while Studio J was under construction.

On June 1, 2018, it was announced that the program would be extended to the 11 AM hour, replacing the long-time show Happening Now, and that the show was moving back to Studio J with a graphics makeover.

On December 19, 2019, it was announced that Ed Henry would replace Bill Hemmer starting January 20, 2020. He was fired five months later. In August 2020 (after a period of rotating anchors) Trace Gallagher - FNC's Los Angeles based chief breaking news anchor - would become recurring co-host. Gallagher remained in L.A., while Smith hosted from New York City, giving the show anchors on both coasts. In September 2020, Hemmer re-joined the program for the network's live coverage of the 2020 presidential debate in Cleveland, Ohio.

In January 2021, Fox News announced a new daytime programming lineup, bringing back founding co-anchor Bill Hemmer to the newscast, along with Dana Perino. Sandra Smith was moved to the 1-3PM/ET time block to co-anchor a new afternoon newscast with former Chief White House Correspondent John Roberts entitled "America Reports." The newscast returned to its two-hour format, giving the 11AM/ET hour to Harris Faulkner's new program, "The Faulkner Focus."

== Location ==
America's Newsroom is broadcast from Studio J at 1211 Avenue of the Americas (also known as the News Corp. Building), New York City.

Preceded by Fox & Friends	America's Newsroom w/ Bill Hemmer & Dana Perino; 9:00 AM – 11:00 AM	Succeeded by The Faulkner Focus
