= Trace Gallagher =

American news anchor (born 1961)

- Born: Tracy G. Gallagher; September 10, 1961 (age 65); San Diego, California, U.S
- Education: University of San Diego
- Occupations: News anchor; reporter; journalist
- Employer: Fox News
- Spouse: Tracy Holmes (1995-present)
- Children: 2

Tracy G. Gallagher is an American journalist and the anchor of Fox News @ Night, Fox News' late-night news program.

== Background ==
Gallagher grew up in the ski resort town of Mammoth Lakes, California where he was a quarterback for the Mammoth Huskies high school football team. He graduated from high school in 1979. Gallagher studied at the University of San Diego; he majored in business and played quarterback for the Torero football team.

== Fox News ==
Based in Los Angeles, Gallagher worked as a co-anchor (with Martha MacCallum) of The Live Desk and as a substitute anchor for Studio B with Shepard Smith and Fox Report. During his time at Fox, Gallagher has reported on the Space Shuttle Columbia disaster and the 2004 Southeast Asian tsunami. Gallagher has also served as a general assignment correspondent.

He has worked at Fox's Chicago, San Francisco, and New York City news bureaus. Previously Gallagher worked at WCPX (now WKMG) in Orlando, KVBC (now KSNV) in Las Vegas, and KTVB in Boise.

On February 1, 2010, The Live Desk was replaced with America Live with Megyn Kelly. Gallagher continues to anchor and report on Fox programs.

Gallagher has been publicly cited by journalists for making numerous dubious statements on air, including saying in July of 2022 that the COVID-19 misinformation banned on social media “all turned out to be accurate" - a major mischaracterization of the truth.

On September 21, 2022, he was named permanent host of Fox News @ Night, replacing founding host Shannon Bream after she was named host of Fox News Sunday. He has been hosting the program since October 3, 2022 and is based in the Fox Los Angeles studios.
