= Outnumbered (American TV program) =

American television series

- Genre: Talk show News program
- Presented by: Harris Faulkner; Kayleigh McEnany; Rotating Panelists
- Country of origin: United States
- Original language: English
- No. of seasons: 12

Production
- Production locations: New York City, New York, U.S.
- Camera setup: Multi-camera
- Running time: 60 minutes

Original release
- Network: Fox News
- Release: April 28, 2014 – present

Outnumbered (sometimes stylized as Out#) is an American daytime news and talk show that airs weekdays on Fox News at 12 p.m. ET. The program features hosts Harris Faulkner and Kayleigh McEnany, along with two daily guest panelists (one female and one male - who is hence "outnumbered"), where they discuss the news and issues of the day. The program is occasionally partially pre-empted due to breaking news coverage.

== Hosts ==
Current

- Harris Faulkner: (2014–present) - Six-time Emmy award winning journalist, anchor of The Faulkner Focus .
- Kayleigh McEnany: (2021–present) - Former White House press secretary for Donald Trump, host of Saturday in America with Kayleigh McEnany

Former

- Andrea Tantaros: (2014–2016) - Original co-host. Left the network after accusing Fox News CEO Roger Ailes of sexual harassment.
- Sandra Smith: (2014–2018) - Original co-host. Departed the program after being named co-anchor of America's Newsroom. Now co-anchor of America Reports.
- Meghan McCain: (2016–2017) - Went on leave of absence after her father Senator John McCain was diagnosed with brain cancer. Left the program after joining The View as a co-host.
- Melissa Francis: (2018–2020) - Fired from Fox News after a pay dispute.
- Emily Compagno: (2021–2026) - Departed the program after being named co-host of The Five.

== Programming changes ==
On October 2, 2017, it was announced that Outnumbered would be moved to Studio M, and the show would have an extended hour titled Outnumbered, Overtime with Harris Faulkner, but in May 2024 Outnumbered was again moved from Studio M to Studio B at 1211 Avenue of the Americas (also known as the News Corp. Building), in New York City.

On January 18, 2021, Outnumbered Overtime ended and was replaced by America Reports. Harris Faulkner currently hosts The Faulkner Focus, which airs before Outnumbered, at 11 a.m. ET.

Preceded by The Faulkner Focus	Outnumbered; 12:00 PM ET – 1:00 PM ET	Succeeded by America Reports
