= America Reports =

Fox News Program

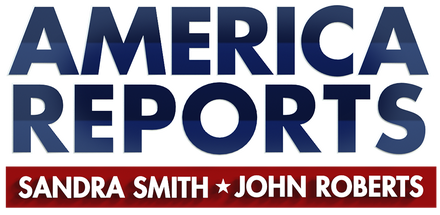
- Also known as: America Reports with John Roberts & Sandra Smith
- Genre: Newsprogram
- Presented by: John Roberts; Sandra Smith
- Country of origin: United States
- Original language: English
- No. of seasons: 5

Production
- Production locations: New York City; Washington, D.C.
- Camera setup: Multi-camera
- Running time: 120 minutes

Original release
- Network: Fox News
- Release: January 18, 2021 – present

America Reports with John Roberts & Sandra Smith is an American television news program on Fox News hosted by John Roberts and Sandra Smith. Episodes air at 1:00 PM ET on weekdays. The show focuses on the day's events and features interviews, current event updates, and comprehensive reporting. The show has been a part of FNC's lineup since January 18, 2021.

== Synopsis ==
The program continues coverage of stories followed during prior hours of Fox News programs. The show often takes a swifter pace compared to the network's other programming, making a larger focus of the program on breaking-news events with live correspondents. The coverage includes correspondents on location, in studio, in addition to analysis from pundits or experts.

Smith, who joined Fox Business as a reporter in 2007 had previously served as a co-host of Outnumbered from 2014 until she was named a co-anchor of America's Newsroom in 2018, where she worked until she joined America Reports in 2021.

Roberts joined Fox News as a senior national correspondent in 2011 after departing CNN. Prior to joining America Reports he served as a White House Correspondent throughout the first Trump Administration from 2017–2021.

Guest hosts for the show include Gillian Turner, Mike Emanuel, Aishah Hasnie, Trace Gallagher, Molly Line, Bill Hemmer, Shannon Bream, Anita Vogel, Jacqui Heinrich and Bill Melugin.

== America Reports ==
Current Hosts

- Sandra Smith, co-anchor (2021–present)
- John Roberts, co-anchor (2021–present)

Correspondent Team

- Peter Doocy, Senior White House Correspondent (2021–present)
- Jacqui Heinrich, Senior White House Correspondent (2021–present)
- Chad Pergram, Senior Congressional Correspondent (2019–present)
- Aishah Hasnie, Congressional Correspondent (2021–present)
- Bill Melugin, National Correspondent (2021–present)
- Gillian Turner, State Department and Foreign Policy Correspondent (2023–present)

== Location ==
Smith broadcasts Live in from Fox's World Headquarters in New York City in Studio J while Roberts broadcasts from Fox's Washington, D.C. bureau.

Preceded by Outnumbered	America Reports; 1:00 PM – 3:00 PM	Succeeded by The Story with Martha MacCallum
