= Bill Hemmer =

American television news anchor (born 1964)

- Hemmer at the 2022 CPJ International Press Freedom Awards
- Born: William G. Hemmer; November 14, 1964 (age 61); Cincinnati, Ohio, U.S.
- Education: Miami University (BA)
- Occupation: Journalist/Television news anchor
- Employer: Fox Corporation

William G. Hemmer (born November 14, 1964) is an American journalist who currently co-anchors America's Newsroom on the Fox News Channel, based in New York City.

== Early life and education ==
Hemmer was born in Cincinnati, Ohio, on November 14, 1964, the son of William Ronald Hemmer, a retired mattress manufacturing-company executive, and Georganne Mary (née Knittle) Hemmer, a homemaker, and retired teacher. He is the middle child and second son of the Hemmers' five children.

Hemmer attended Our Lady of Victory Catholic parochial school before graduating from Elder High School in Cincinnati in 1983. During his senior year, Hemmer and a friend started a radio program, playing fifteen minutes of music before classes began. He credits this time as the beginning of his interest in broadcasting.

Hemmer received a Bachelor of Arts degree in broadcast journalism from Miami University in Oxford, Ohio. While at Miami University, he joined the Delta Tau Delta fraternity and studied in Europe at the Miami University Dolibois European Center, which was then located in Luxembourg City.

== Career ==
=== Early career ===
Hemmer started in sports production at WLWT-TV in the mid-1980s, when he realized his passion for live television. During his senior year at Miami University, Hemmer was offered a position at WLWT-TV as a sports producer. Soon after, he went to the CBS affiliate WCPO-TV as a sports reporter and anchor.

At age 26, Hemmer took a nearly year-long hiatus from WCPO-TV to backpack around the world. During his trip, Hemmer spent time in New Zealand, Hong Kong, China, Vietnam, Nepal, India, Egypt, Israel, and Russia, among other places. He credits this experience with helping him land a job at CNN in Atlanta a short time later. Throughout the journey, Hemmer wrote dispatches and submitted tapes and photos for both The Cincinnati Post, a now-defunct local newspaper, and CBS's local affiliate that were assembled into several pieces collectively known as "Bill's Excellent Adventure." The program won him two regional Emmys, Best Entertainment Program and Best Host.

=== CNN ===
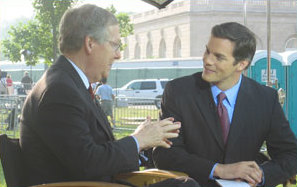
Hemmer interviewing Senator Mitch McConnell in 2004

Hemmer worked at CNN from 1995 to 2005, hosting several programs, including American Morning (initially with Paula Zahn, and later with Soledad O'Brien), CNN Tonight, CNN Early Edition, CNN Morning News, and CNN Live Today with co-anchor Daryn Kagan.

During the 2000 United States presidential election in Florida, Hemmer was one of the first national reporters in Tallahassee, Florida, where he remained for 37 days until the United States Supreme Court ruled in Bush v. Gore. For his non-stop reporting, Hemmer garnered national attention and the nickname "The Chad Lad".

In May 2001, Hemmer played an instrumental role in the network's coverage of the Timothy McVeigh execution, reporting from Terre Haute, Indiana, where McVeigh was put to death for his part in the Oklahoma City bombing. He reported from the World Trade Center site in New York City for a month in the aftermath of the September 11 attacks, and from Kandahar, Afghanistan, during the buildup of American forces in the early days of the War on Terror.

In the summer of 2002, Hemmer reported live from Somerset, Pennsylvania, on the mining accident that trapped nine workers for 77 hours when a wall separating their tunnel from an abandoned, flooded mine gave way, sending millions of gallons of water into their work area. In 2003, Hemmer traveled to Kuwait to report on escalating tensions in Iraq and remained on-site to cover Operation Iraqi Freedom when the war began. He also spent more than a month covering the crisis in Kosovo, where he reported on the aerial bombing missions from Aviano Air Base in Italy, the refugee crisis from Skopje, Macedonia, and on the latest NATO developments from Brussels.

=== Fox News ===
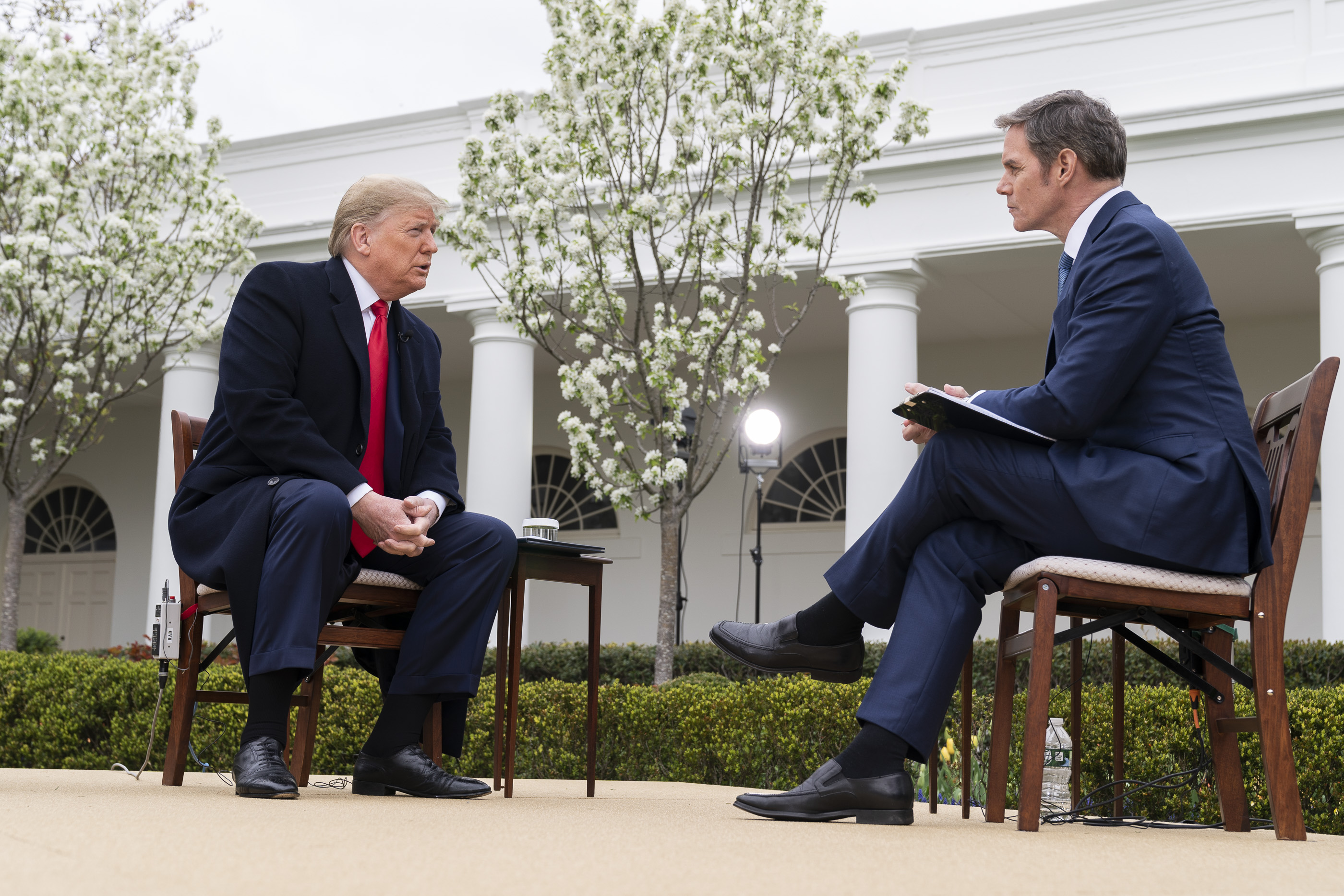
Hemmer interviewing President Donald Trump in 2020

Hemmer joined Fox News in August 2005 where he was immediately dispatched to Louisiana for coverage of Hurricane Katrina and Hurricane Rita. In 2020, he hosted a weekday afternoon newscast Bill Hemmer Reports and served as Chief Anchor for breaking news and other live significant events. Before that, he was the founding morning co-anchor of America's Newsroom.

During the war between Israel and Hezbollah in Lebanon during the summer of 2006, Hemmer reported from the front lines in the town of Metula in northern Israel. Throughout the 2008, 2012, and 2016 election seasons, Hemmer covered the political party conventions from their respective cities—including the Iowa Caucus and New Hampshire Primary. His "BillBoard" on election nights provides real-time voter data and information from precincts, counties, and states across the country, capturing the vote in real-time.

Hemmer was the network's lead reporter and anchor from the Sandy Hook Elementary School shooting in Newtown, Connecticut, as well as the site of the Boston Marathon bombing in April 2013.

In July 2018, Hemmer traveled to Helsinki, Finland, to report on President Trump's summit with Russian President Vladimir Putin. In 2019, Hemmer covered February's nuclear summit between President Trump and Chairman Kim Jong-un from Hanoi, Vietnam, concluding that assignment at the DMZ in South Korea. He also had the first interview with then-Attorney General William Barr when he traveled to El Salvador after the release of Special Counsel Robert Mueller's report on the Russia Investigation in May.

In 2021, Fox News announced a new weekday programming lineup, moving Hemmer back to America's Newsroom with co-anchor Dana Perino. Hemmer has been a regular stand-in host for Fox News Sunday, its flagship weekend interview program. He anchors a Podcast titled "Hemmer Time", which looks at various issues, topics, and changes in technology.

== Personal life ==
Hemmer is Roman Catholic and is a supporter of Iraq and Afghanistan Veterans of America. He started dating model Dara Tomanovich in 2005. They separated in 2013.

Each year, Hemmer returns to Cincinnati to host the George Knittle Memorial Bayley Place Golf Classic named in honor of his grandfather, George Francis Knittle, which benefits Bayley Senior Living. Mr. Knittle died at the age of 100 on August 26, 2003.

In April 2013, Hemmer spent a week at the Vatican moderating the Second Annual Adult Stem Cell Research Conference and in May of the same year served as the keynote speaker at Miami University's Farmer School of Business commencement and along with two fellow Miami University graduates, he established the MUDEC scholarship in honor of the long-time service of Emile Haag to the Miami University Dolibois European Center and awarded to a student seeking financial assistance to attend school in Luxembourg. Also in 2013, Hemmer received the Elder High School Professional Distinction award.

== See also ==
- List of CNN anchors
- List of The Daily Show guests
- List of Delta Tau Delta members
- List of Miami University people
- New Yorkers in journalism
