= Newsmax =

American cable news and digital media company

Newsmax, Inc.
- Logo used since 2021
- Type: Public
- Traded as: NYSE: NMAX (Class B)
- Industry: Mass media; Journalism
- Founded: September 16, 1998; 28 years ago
- Founder: Christopher Ruddy
- Headquarters: Boca Raton, Florida, U.S.
- Key people: Christopher Ruddy (CEO); Darryle Burnham (CFO); Lokesh Tiwari (CIO)
- Products: Cable television Publishing
- Revenue: ▲US$189 million (2025)
- Net income: ▼ −US$99.5 million (2025)
- Divisions: Newsmax TV; Humanix Books
- Website: newsmax.com

Newsmax, Inc. (or Newsmax.com, previously styled NewsMax) is an American cable news, political opinion commentary, and digital media company founded by Christopher Ruddy in 1998. It has been variously described as conservative, (Note: Conservative: Peters 2011; Hayes, Dade (July 30, 2019). "Trump-Aligned Newsmax TV Parts Ways With CEO Michael Clemente – Report". Deadline. Archived from the original on October 22, 2020.; Santaniello 2010.; Greenfeld 2014.; Friedman 2009.; Polskin 2019.; Grynbaum, Michael M.; Koblin, John (November 22, 2020). "Newsmax, Once a Right-Wing Also-Ran, Is Rising, and Trump Approves". The New York Times. ISSN 0362-4331. Archived from the original on March 30, 2021.; Cooper, Jonathan J. (August 9, 2023). "Trump says he won't sign Republican loyalty pledge, flouting debate requirement". Associated Press. Archived from the original on August 11, 2023.) right-wing, (Note: Right wing: Moore, Martin; Colley, Thomas (June 13, 2022). "Two International Propaganda Models: Comparing RT and CGTN's 2020 US Election Coverage". Journalism Practice. 18 (5): 1306–1328. doi:10.1080/17512786.2022.2086157. ISSN 1751-2786. S2CID 249696725. "Stylistically, RT presenters on US politics have more in common with presenters from right-wing US Fox News or NewsMax than CNN or the BBC..."; Hayes, Dade (July 30, 2019). "Trump-Aligned Newsmax TV Parts Ways With CEO Michael Clemente – Report". Deadline. Archived from the original on October 22, 2020. "After a little more than a year on the job, Michael Clemente is out as CEO of Newsmax TV, a right-wing outlet frequently in step with President Donald Trump."; Grynbaum & Koblin 2020.; Peters 2011. "Newsmax, the magazine and Web site that Mr. Ruddy founded more than a decade ago, is the right-wing populist's Time or Newsweek."; Rupar, Aaron (July 28, 2021). "Why Newsmax is failing". Vox. Archived from the original on September 4, 2022. "Instead, you would've had to turn to Newsmax, the right-wing cable news channel that's sticking to its old-school strategy of being the Trumpiest channel on TV."; "Media misinformation watchdog says right-wing channel Newsmax frequently traffics in Jan. 6 falsehoods". MarketWatch. Associated Press. July 21, 2022. Archived from the original on September 5, 2022.; "How conservative media has grown under Trump". Columbia Journalism Review. Archived from the original on January 26, 2021. "Some are venerable right-wing reliables like National Review, The Washington Times, or Newsmax.") and far-right. (Note: Far right: Popkin, Samuel L. (April 2021). "The Great Wall of Mexico". Crackup: The Republican Implosion and the Future of Presidential Politics. Oxford University Press. p. 106. doi:10.1093/oso/9780190913823.003.0005. ISBN 978-0-19-091382-3. Archived from the original on February 9, 2023. "He bonded with Chris Ruddy, a Palm Beach resident and Mar-A-Lago member who founded Newsmax, a prominent far-right media corporation credited with spawning 'a cottage industry of conspiracy buffs' with its lurid claims that the death of President Clinton's aide Vince Foster wasn't a suicide, but instead a murder that had been covered up."; Moore, Roy L.; Murray, Michael D.; Youm, Kyu Ho (September 30, 2021). Media Law and Ethics (6th ed.). Routledge. ISBN 978-1-000-43983-0. Archived from the original on September 5, 2022 – via Google Books. "Also, a government cybersecurity official in charge of safeguarding the integrity of the presidential election sued the Trump Campaign, one of its lawyers and far-right media outlet Newsmax for libel, claiming they conspired to falsely assert widespread election fraud. [...] One Trump campaign lawyer said on far-right cable channel Newsmax: 'He should be drawn and quartered. Taken out and shot.'"; Delaney, Tim (May 6, 2022). The Diversity of Darkness and Shameful Behaviors. Routledge. ISBN 978-1-000-58475-2. Archived from the original on September 5, 2022 – via Google Books. "It needs to be noted that on April 30, 2021, Newsmax (the far right wing news alternative to FOX News) apologized for airing false allegations that Dominion Voting Systems manipulated machines or tallies on Election Day to the detriment of Donald Trump."; "Melania Trump to make Parler her 'social media home'". Reuters. February 9, 2022. Archived from the original on February 10, 2022.; Graziosi, Graig (August 30, 2022). "Mike Lindell blames failed voter fraud summit on Big Tech 'conspiracy'". The Independent. Archived from the original on September 2, 2022.; "Bianca de la Garza has a co-anchor gig on far-right cable TV channel Newsmax". The Boston Globe. February 4, 2022. Archived from the original on September 2, 2022.; Fechter, Joshua (May 25, 2022). "Top Texas Republicans resist gun control and push for more armed teachers and police at schools in wake of Uvalde shooting". The Texas Tribune. Archived from the original on May 26, 2022.; Durkee, Alison (November 3, 2021). "Voting Company Smartmatic Sues One America News And Newsmax For Defamation Over Election Fraud Claims". Forbes. Archived from the original on June 21, 2022.; Jackson, Natalie (July 8, 2021). "Whether Republicans Get Vaccinated Has A Lot To Do With If They Watch Fox News ... Or OANN". FiveThirtyEight. Archived from the original on September 2, 2022.; Wilson, Reid (November 1, 2021). "Stunning survey gives grim view of flourishing anti-democratic opinions". The Hill. Archived from the original on August 6, 2022.; Milligan, Susan (February 24, 2022). "A Quarter of Republicans Believe Central Views of QAnon Conspiracy Movement". U.S. News & World Report. Archived from the original on June 25, 2022.; Rothschild, Neal; Fischer, Sara (June 29, 2021). "Boring news cycle deals blow to partisan media". Axios. Archived from the original on September 2, 2022.; Epstein, Adam (February 9, 2021). "Fox News claims it won't move further right, but the evidence says otherwise". Quartz. Archived from the original on September 2, 2022.; Swanson, Conrad (May 5, 2022). "Colorado attorney for Trump faces ethics complaint over election misinformation, Jan. 6 insurrection". The Denver Post. Archived from the original on September 2, 2022.; Covucci, David (November 11, 2021). "Somehow Newsmax is calling for Gigi Sohn to be confirmed to FCC". The Daily Dot. Archived from the original on September 2, 2022.; Norman, Bob (July 20, 2021). "The right-wing media capital of America". Columbia Journalism Review. Archived from the original on October 10, 2021. "Gaetz found a lifeboat in Newsmax, the far-right cable station ...") Newsmax Media divisions include its cable and broadcast channel Newsmax TV; its website Newsmax.com, which includes Newsmax Health and Newsmax Finance; and Newsmax magazine, its monthly print publication. The company went public in March 2025.

Newsmax launched Newsmax TV in June 2014 to 35 million satellite subscribers through DirecTV and Dish Network. As of 2019, the network claimed to reach about 70 million households via cable television. The average weekly audience for Newsmax TV is about 319,000 people, as of April 2025. The channel primarily broadcasts from Newsmax's New York studio on Manhattan's East Side, with two headquarters in Boca Raton, Florida, and Washington, D.C. Newsmax began broadcasting in the United Kingdom in October 2023, via Freeview Connect.

The website has been described by The New York Times as a "potent force in conservative politics". Ruddy has positioned the network as a competitor to Fox News, including by hiring former Fox News hosts Rob Schmitt, Greg Kelly, Bob Sellers, and Heather Childers. The Washington Post described Newsmax as "a landing spot for cable news personalities in need of a new home", citing the network's airing of Mark Halperin and Bill O'Reilly following their resignations from other networks due to sexual harassment allegations.

After the 2020 United States presidential election, Newsmax broadcast numerous conspiracy theories made by President Donald Trump, the Trump campaign, and a Newsmax host, which alleged voter fraud in the 2020 election. When asked about Newsmax's support of former President Trump, Ruddy stated, "We have an editorial policy of being supportive of the president and his policies." A month after the election, Newsmax began recognizing Joe Biden as a duly elected president. In 2021, Newsmax issued an apology and retracted its voter fraud conspiracy allegations.

In 2021, Newsmax was sued by Dominion Voting Systems and Smartmatic for promoting false claims that the companies had engaged in election fraud during the 2020 presidential election. Newsmax settled Smartmatic's lawsuit in September 2024 by agreeing to pay Smartmatic $40 million. A judge ruled in April 2025 that Newsmax broadcast false and defamatory statements against Dominion about the election, and four months later, Newsmax settled Dominion's lawsuit by agreeing to pay Dominion $67 million.

== History and content ==
Newsmax
- Website type: Conservative news
- Available in: English
- Owners: Newsmax, Inc.
- Creator: Christopher Ruddy
- Editor: Christopher Ruddy
- Key people: Christopher Ruddy (CEO); Darryle Burnham (CFO); Lokesh Tiwari (CIO)
- Website: www.newsmax.com
- Commercial: Yes
- Registration: Optional, but is required to comment
- Launched: September 16, 1998; 28 years ago
- Current status: Active

Christopher Ruddy started Newsmax.com on September 16, 1998, supported by a group of investors including the family of former Central Intelligence Agency Director William J. Casey. Later, Richard Mellon Scaife, Ruddy's former employer at the Pittsburgh Tribune-Review, invested in the fledgling company. One of the initial board members was author James Dale Davidson, who edited a financial newsletter, Strategic Investment. Davidson's co-editor, Lord Rees-Mogg, former editor of the Times of London, later became chairman of Newsmax. The prior year, Ruddy’s book, The Strange Death of Vince Foster, was published by Simon & Schuster/Free Press, about the suicide of Vince Foster.

Other news figures who later joined the Newsmax board included Arnaud de Borchgrave, the longtime Newsweek chief correspondent who also serves as editor-at-large of United Press International (UPI), and Jeff Cunningham, former publisher of Forbes. Admiral Thomas Moorer, the former chairman of the Joint Chiefs of Staff and chief of naval operations during the Vietnam War, also served as one of the company's founding board members. Former United States secretary of state and Nixon and Ford administration chief of staff General Alexander M. Haig, Jr. served as special adviser to Newsmax.

Although since its founding, the company had been known for its anti-Clinton content, in the fall of 2007, Newsmax CEO Christopher Ruddy published a favorable review of former president Bill Clinton's book Giving: How Each of Us Can Change the World and a positive interview with him at Newsmax.com, followed by a positive cover story in Newsmax magazine. The New York Times said with reference to the event that politics had made "strange bedfellows". Bill Clinton also visited the Newsmax headquarters in West Palm Beach in 2010. In 2014, Newsmax donated $1 million to the Clinton Foundation and Ruddy has accompanied Clinton on foundation trips to Africa.

In a January 2010 profile on the company, the Financial Times reported that the "rise of Newsmax" had defied the media trend and said that the Newsmax website was "one of the strongest conservative voices online". The paper said Newsmax had witnessed 40 percent growth rates per annum over the past decade, closing 2009 with $36 million revenues, up from $25 million the year before. Earlier Ruddy had told Business Insider the company expected annual 2010 revenues to reach $50 million.

A profile on Newsmax in The New York Times described the company as a "potent force in conservative politics" and noted the company's headquarters had become a must stop for Republican candidates seeking the party's 2012 nomination.

Starting in April 2013, Newsmax.com and its affiliated sites drew 14.4 million unique visitors, leading comScore's News/Politics category over such sites as The Huffington Post Politics, Fox News Politics, CNN Politics, NBCNews.com Politics, and Politico in monthly viewership for two consecutive months.

Newsmax contributors include Nancy Brinker, George Will, Lanny Davis, Alan Dershowitz, Christopher W. Ruddy, David Limbaugh, Ben Stein, Susan Estrich, Laura Schlessinger, Michael Reagan, Dr. Mehmet Oz and Dr. Michael Roizen.

In November 2017, Politico reported that Fox News, facing new competitors, was giving more favorable coverage to President Donald Trump. In an interview, Newsmax CEO Christopher Ruddy criticized Fox News' hosts unwillingness to criticize President Donald Trump, telling Politico that "Newsmax is very supportive of the president, but we also will publish things that are critical of him time to time", Ruddy said. "Fox seems to have decided to become very closely aligned, which seems unnatural, and it doesn't seem consistent.

=== Coverage of the 2020 United States presidential election ===
During the 2020 United States presidential election, President Trump began to promote Newsmax over its rival, Fox News. Trump's preference for Newsmax over Fox News became clearer after the latter became the first news outlet to call Arizona for Democratic challenger Joe Biden. Newsmax has made their more conservative leanings a selling point to disaffected Fox News viewers, as well as employing Fox News alumni to join their lineup on Newsmax TV, such as Rob Schmitt and Greg Kelly. Emily VanDerWerff of Vox reported that the outlet "spent lots of time arguing that other media outlets jumped the gun in calling the election for Biden and that Trump still has a path to win this thing", and that it was one of the only networks that didn't call the election for Biden, citing the Trump campaign's legal challenges. However, she did write that "Newsmax doesn't go full arch-conservative" and "doesn't give airtime to QAnon paranoiacs".

CNN's Brian Stelter, in an on-air interview, asked Newsmax CEO Christopher Ruddy why the network chose to air "election denialism" and "bogus voter fraud stuff", to which Ruddy replied that the network featured all points of view and argued that all of the other major news outlets who had reported Biden's election win were "rushing".

In an interview with Variety, Ruddy stated that, "We are waiting for the states' certification and the electoral college, but we will at some point when that happens" and insisted: "We will be supportive of whoever the next president is." He added "Newsmax would never become Trump TV. We have always seen ourselves as an independent news agency" but would be willing to Trump having a weekly show. Ruddy says the company is "moderately conservative and we will continue to have a moderately conservative viewpoint on things – including the president".

In a later interview with The New Yorker, Ruddy stated, "I do think that Donald Trump should concede when the certifications come in", he said, adding that he "would not support going to state legislators to overturn the electors". Following the certification of the electoral college of Joe Biden as the winner on December 14, 2020, the network began using the title "President-elect" to refer to Biden.

=== Acquisition reports ===
On November 15, 2020, The Wall Street Journal reported that Hicks Equity Partners, a private equity firm with ties to a co-chair of the Republican National Committee, was exploring a buyout of Newsmax. The Hicks group identified a team of executives who would manage the network, and had been talking to former Fox News hosts including Megyn Kelly. Media analyst Michael Nathanson reported that if a competing network took 20% of Fox News' audience, it could sap about $200 million in annual profit from the company. In an interview with Variety, Newsmax CEO Christopher Ruddy stated "we are not actively selling" the company though he had expressions of interests from investors. Regarding Hicks Equity Partners, Ruddy stated, "we have no deal with them". Ruddy stated that "We would like to overtake Fox News in 12 months, and I think it's doable."

=== Post-2020 United States presidential election ===
Newsmax promoted baseless allegations that voting machine company Smartmatic and its competitor Dominion Voting Systems had conspired to rig the election against Trump. On Facebook, Newsmax published a video of its host Carl Higbie making three minutes of debunked claims against the election results, which accumulated 16.5 million views from November 7 to 10. In December 2020, Smartmatic sent a letter to Newsmax threatening legal action and demanding "a full and complete retraction of all false and defamatory statements and reports".

Days later, a Newsmax host stated the company "would like to clarify its news coverage and note it has not reported as true certain claims" made by Newsmax interviewees about Dominion and Smartmatic. Newsmax declared that it had "no evidence" of certain claims made on its programming, including the claim that the two companies have a business relationship, the claim that either company used each other's software, and the claim that either company "manipulated votes" in the 2020 American general election. Newsmax also stated it had "no evidence" that Smartmatic software was used anywhere except Los Angeles during the 2020 election. Newsmax additionally said viewers should be aware of "several facts", including that both companies have no relationship with George Soros, and that "Smartmatic is a U.S. company and not owned by the Venezuelan government" or any other foreign entity.

Mediaite's Rudy Takala wrote that conservatives disgruntled with Fox News could potentially be disappointed by Newsmax due to CEO Christopher Ruddy's friendship with former Democratic president Bill Clinton and positive remarks about a Hillary Clinton presidential campaign. Newsmax has previously donated $1 million to the Clinton Foundation. When reached for comment, Ruddy said, "Like Donald Trump, Rupert Murdoch and other business people, I have donated to the Clinton Foundation and a few Democrats, but over 90 percent of my political contributions have been to Republicans, including ones to President Trump."

Jeffrey McCall, a journalism professor at DePauw University, told Mediaite that "Ruddy is a pragmatist unlikely to allow his operation to be a fully ideological platform. Trump allies who want to bend the arc of media progressivism will need a much more comprehensive national strategy than just trying to take over one particular media outlet."

Adweek reported that Newsmax's TV ratings grew tenfold in the fourth quarter of 2020 compared to the previous quarter. Its top two shows, Spicer & Co. and Greg Kelly Reports (at 7 p.m.), averaged 816,000 total viewers during the same November 7–18 interval. Regarding coverage of the Biden administration, CEO Christopher Ruddy told Adweek "I think Newsmax's job is to be loyal opposition, to question the policies, the programs and the people that are coming into the Biden administration. We're going to take a very careful look at that. I think we were pretty fair with Barack Obama. We were tough on him, but we never called for his impeachment", he said. Newsmax TV momentarily exceeded Fox News in viewership in December 2020, but lost viewers after the conclusion of the election cycle. A Pew Research Center study found that Newsmax's reach (10% of American adults) continued to trail Fox News's reach (43% of American adults) in March 2021.

In July 2021, Vox noted that "Newsmax's effort to out-Trump the competition has been less successful since Trump left the White House for Mar-a-Lago. Newsmax's viewership is down more than 50 percent from January (from an average of about 300,000 viewers then to about 114,000 on July 18), and following a significant slump in December and January, Fox News has reestablished itself as not just the most-watched right-wing cable news network but the most-watched cable news network, period."

In November 2021, a study by the Center for Countering Digital Hate described Newsmax as being among "ten fringe publishers" that together were responsible for nearly 70 percent of Facebook user interactions with content that denies climate change. Facebook disputed the study's methodology.

Also in November 2021, Newsmax White House correspondent Emerald Robinson falsely tweeted that the Moderna COVID-19 vaccine contained luciferase "so that you can be tracked". This echoed earlier false social media claims that the vaccine supposedly had satanic links due to "lucifer" in luciferase and alleged references to "666". Robinson's tweet began with the salutation "Dear Christians" and referred her over 400,000 followers to the Book of Revelation; in a tweet days earlier, she equated vaccines with the Mark of the Beast. Twitter removed the tweet that day and suspended Robinson's account for seven days, citing "repeated violations of our COVID-19 misinformation policy", as Newsmax sought to distance itself from her remark and removed her from the air pending an inquiry. Robinson returned to Twitter after her suspension to continue spreading COVID-19 misinformation, causing Twitter to permanently ban her within hours. Newsmax announced the next month that it would not renew Robinson's contract when it ended in January 2022.

DirecTV dropped Newsmax from its lineup in January 2023, after the companies failed to agree on contract terms. In response, 42 House Republicans signed a letter to DirecTV executives attacking the removal as an act of "suppressing politically disfavored speech". The two companies resolved their dispute and DirecTV resumed broadcasting Newsmax in March 2023.

In May 2023 the "small conservative cable news channel saw its ratings surge" once again in response to actions by Fox News: "Fox's decision to fire [Tucker] Carlson". Newsmax's viewership during the prime-time spot vacated by Carlson more than doubled. This increase surpassed the 2020 post-election surge and on a night-by-night basis they challenged CNN through the month to be the third-most-watched cable news channel (behind MSNBC and Fox). On November 1, 2023, Newsmax placed its live content behind a paywall on YouTube ("Newsmax+") while still offering a free streaming channel ("Newsmax 2").

In March 2024, The Washington Post reported that between 2019 and 2020, a member of the Qatari Royal Family had invested $50 million in the network in the midst of the Qatar diplomatic crisis. It also reported that network leaders had told staffers to soften coverage related to Qatar following the investment, a claim the network later denied in response to the report. The investment was made by Sheikh Sultan bin Jassim Al Thani, a former Qatari government official and the owner of a London-based investment fund, with Newsmax looking for outside investors to better compete with Fox News.

In April 2024, Newsmax was included as a defendant in a defamation lawsuit by a man who was falsely identified as the perpetrator of the 2023 Allen, Texas mall shooting, alongside others such as Fox News and InfoWars personality Owen Shroyer. The man alleged the defendants had "recklessly disregarded basic journalistic safeguards and published the photo of an innocent man, branding him as a neo-Nazi murderer to his local community and the nation at large".

==== 2020 election lawsuits ====
In December 2020, Newsmax was included as a defendant in a defamation lawsuit by Dominion executive Eric Coomer. Coomer asserted that the defendants had characterized him as a "traitor" and that as a result he was subjected to "multiple credible death threats". In April 2021, Newsmax published a retraction and apology on its website, saying it "found no evidence" to support the allegations against Coomer.

In August 2021, Dominion sued Newsmax for "knowingly and continuously" promoting false election fraud narratives. Newsmax said in a statement that it had "simply reported on allegations made by well-known public figures, including the President, his advisors and members of Congress", adding: "Dominion's action today is a clear attempt to squelch such reporting and undermine a free press". On April 9, 2025, a Delaware judge determined that Newsmax's coverage of Dominion was defamatory and consisted of false claims that Dominion had manipulated votes during the election, among other incorrect allegations. To evaluate whether Newsmax acted with actual malice and determine possible damages, the case was set for a jury trial later in April, but the judge postponed it. On August 15, a $67 million settlement was reached; the documents were filed with the court on August 18.

In November 2021, Smartmatic sued Newsmax for defamation. In August 2023, a Delaware judge rejected Newsmax's bid to narrow the alleged defamatory statements cited by Smartmatic. The trial was set to begin on September 30, 2024. Newsmax and Smartmatic settled the suit on confidential terms on September 26. In March 2025, it was revealed that Newsmax had agreed to pay $40 million to settle the lawsuit.

=== Initial public offering ===
On June 10, 2024, during its coverage of a rally organized in Las Vegas by former and current president Donald Trump, Newsmax announced it plans to file for an initial public stock offering either in late 2024 or early 2025. The plan was confirmed on September 5, 2024, with the company expected to be listed under the ticker symbol "NMAX" on the New York Stock Exchange in the first quarter of 2025. In November 2024, Newsmax offered preferred stock to accredited investors in an effort to raise $100 million. On January 25, 2025, the offering was extended to $200 million, surpassing $220 million by March 2025. The company made its stock market debut on March 31, 2025. The shares, priced at $10 in the IPO, closed their first trading day at $83.51, an increase of over 700%. The shares closed their second day of trading at $234—with a market capitalization of almost $30 billion, surpassing that of Fox Corporation.

Newsmax's stock price declined 77.5% on April 2 and closed at $52.71. Financial commentators described the rapid rise and fall of Newsmax's stock price as the trajectory of a meme stock, and some traders compared Newsmax to GameStop in online discussions, referencing the 2021 GameStop short squeeze.

== Lawsuit against Fox ==
On September 3, 2025, Newsmax filed an antitrust lawsuit against Fox, accusing it of anti-competitive tactics that deliberately stifle competition. The lawsuit, filed in a Florida federal court, accused Fox News of using its market power to coerce TV providers to restrict competing right-leaning channels. The lawsuit was dismissed by a federal judge in Miami on September 5, 2025, although Newsmax was given permission to refile the complaint.

In October 2025, Newsmax refiled its lawsuit against Fox in the Western District of Wisconsin, asking a judge to reject Fox's bid to transfer the lawsuit back to Florida and arguing it had an "absolute right" to pursue the case in Wisconsin. Newsmax also denied engaging in impermissible "forum shopping" for a friendlier court.

In April 2026 the case was transferred to the Southern District of Florida, with the judge describing Newsmax's actions as forum shopping.

In November 2026, Newsmax filed an antitrust lawsuit challenging Fox Corp.'s $22B acquisition of Roku.

== Reception ==
In 2009, Columbia Journalism Review editor Michael Massing stated that "far-right Web sites like WorldNetDaily and Newsmax.com floated all kinds of specious stories about Obama that quickly careened around the blogosphere and onto talk radio. One particular favorite was the claim that Bill Ayers ghost-wrote Dreams From My Father." In March 2009, MarketWatch's media critic Jon Friedman stated that "Newsmax has flourished because Ruddy has exhibited a stronger commitment to the bottom line than to presenting himself as an ideologue."

Former president Bill Clinton, who described Newsmax's CEO Ruddy as a friend, made headlines when he visited Newsmax's offices during the summer of 2010. When Sarah Palin stopped by the office for an interview, U.S. News & World Report suggested the move was the clearest indication yet she was planning to run for president. According to the magazine, Newsmax is a major player in GOP politics, as seen during the 2012 primaries. Visitors have also included Rep. Michele Bachmann, Gov. Tim Pawlenty, Sen. John Thune, Gov. Haley Barbour, Sen. Mitt Romney, former Florida Gov. Jeb Bush, and former Sen. Rick Santorum, among others.

An April 2010 cover story for Talkers Magazine featured Newsmax as a model of future media companies called "Media Stations" that offer their audience audio, video, digital, and print content. In 2010, Nielsen Online said Newsmax was the most trafficked conservative website with approximately 4 million unique visitors monthly.

In 2014, Bloomberg Businessweek detailed Newsmax's business model of targeting higher-income baby boomers; the average age of a Newsmax online reader was 54.7 years. The article reported Newsmax's plans to launch a linear and over-the-top (OTT) content cable channel, and noted that Newsmax differentiated itself from its competitors by offering "a smorgasbord of political, health, and financial information, self-help books, and even vitamin supplements", which made Newsmax "less of a news business and more of a strange hybrid of the Heritage Foundation and Amway".

In 2017, The Washington Post described the relationship Ruddy, though not a registered Republican, had with President Donald Trump as a significant influence "with his dual role as a newsman and a close friend".

In 2019, the Columbia Journalism Review reported, "There are currently about 15 to 20 conservative websites which attract at least one million unique visitors per month. Some are venerable right-wing reliables like National Review, The Washington Times, or Newsmax. Others, like Infowars, The Gateway Pundit, Big League Politics, and Breitbart, mine the far fringes of the right."

The misinformation tracker NewsGuard has given Newsmax an unfavorable score of 20 out of 100. The Wikipedia community has categorized Newsmax in its lowest rank of reliability due to Newsmax's promotion of unsubstantiated conspiracy theories.

== Additional outlets ==
=== Humanix Books ===
Humanix Books
- Parent company: Newsmax Media
- Founded: 1969
- Founder: Health; Personal finance; Current affairs; Politics
- Country of origin: United States
- Headquarters location: New York, New York
- Distribution: Two Rivers Distribution
- Key people: Adam Keith Pfeffer (deputy publisher)
- Publication types: Books
- Official website: Humanix Books

Humanix Books is an American print and e-book publishing house and a division of Newsmax Media. The company publishes books in the areas of health, personal finance, current affairs, and politics. Books by the company are distributed by Two Rivers Distribution.

The company began operations in 1969. The first titles by the company were published in response to the need for higher quality classroom materials to support learning. In 2012 the company was acquired by Newsmax Media and shortly after Anthony Ziccardi was named the publisher of Humanix Books. The company released The ObamaCare Survival Guide by Nick J. Tate that same year. The book lays out the arguments against the Affordable Care Act, becoming a number one New York Times Best Seller in the Paperback Advice & Miscellaneous category for paperback books. In 2015, Mary Glenn replaced Anthony Ziccardi as the publisher of the company. In 2019, Adam Keith Pfeffer was named the deputy publisher of the company.

=== Newsmax magazine ===
Newsmax Media publishes Newsmax magazine, which the company describes as "offering Americans the perspective they need on current events, politics, health, money, and lifestyle". The company reports a monthly readership of almost one million on their paid subscription products, including Newsmax magazine and multiple finance- and health-focused newsletters.

=== Newsmax TV ===
In 2014, Newsmax Media announced they would be starting a new television news channel that would be marketed to compete with Fox News Channel. It was launched as Newsmax TV in June 2014 with 8 hours of live programming daily, available through the Dish Network and DirecTV as well as for free on the Newsmax website.

=== Newsmax Adria ===
Newsmax Adria was a partnership between Newsmax Media and United Media that began operating in June 2020. The new partnership operated in most of the former Yugoslav countries. It produced a newly retitled daily news bulletins Dnevnik Newsmax Adria on Nova BH in Bosnia and Herzegovina, and evening magazine program Pregled dana on Nova S in Serbia. Alongside N1 and Nova S, Newsmax Adria acted as a rival to Telekom Srbija and regularly reported Serbia's government corruption scandals. It ceased production in October 2022.

In September 2024, Newsmax announced that it would resume operation in Serbia in October as Newsmax Balkans, marketed in the region as "real news for real people". In May 2025, the network announced an expansion to Bosnia and Herzegovina and Montenegro.

=== Radio ===
Newsmax acquired WAQI and WQBA, two radio stations in South Florida, from the Latino Media Network in November 2026.
