= Rob Schmitt =

American news anchor and reporter (born 1983)

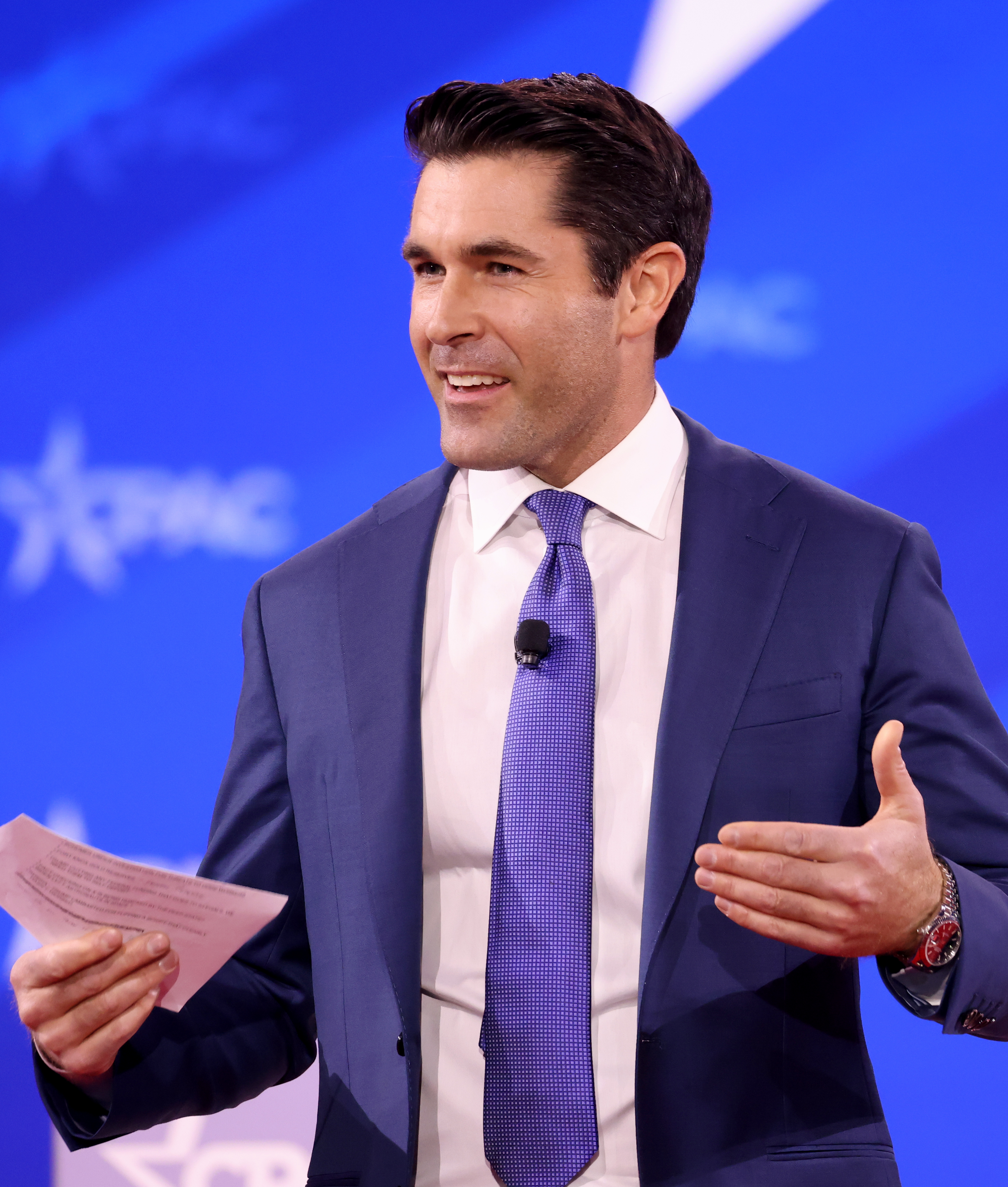
- Schmitt in 2025
- Born: Robert Stephen Schmitt III; August 13, 1983 (age 43); Carmel, Indiana, U.S
- Education: Indiana University Bloomington (BA)
- Occupations: Television anchor Political commentator
- Years active: 2008–present
- Employer(s): Newsmax TV (2020-present); Fox News (2016-2020)
- Height: 6'2
- Parent(s): Robert E. Schmitt Jr; Farzaneh Schmitt

Robert Stephen Schmitt III (born August 13, 1983) is an American conservative news anchor and political commentator who previously served as a co-host on Fox & Friends First. He stopped appearing on the network in August 2020 and currently hosts the nightly program Rob Schmitt Tonight on Newsmax.

== Early life and education ==
Schmitt was born on August 13, 1983, and raised in Carmel, Indiana. He is the son of Farzaneh Schmitt, an immigrant from Iran, and Robert E. Schmitt Jr. of German descent. In 2005, Schmitt graduated with a B.A. in journalism from Indiana University Bloomington.

== Career ==
In 2008, he accepted a position as a weekend anchor at the ABC affiliate WPLG-TV in Miami, Florida. In 2011, he accepted a position as an anchor with CBS Los Angeles and in 2013, as an anchor at WNBC-TV in New York City. In 2016, he moved to Fox News where he served as co-host on Fox Nation with Carley Shimkus and worked as a co-anchor of Fox & Friends First with Jillian Mele. In August 2020, Schmitt ceased appearances on Fox and started appearing in Newsmax content. His nightly program, Rob Schmitt Tonight, premiered on Newsmax on December 21, 2020.
