= Fox & Friends First =

American Fox News breakfast television program (since 2012)

- Genre: News program; Talk show
- Presented by: Carley Shimkus; Todd Piro; Chanley Painter
- Country of origin: United States
- Original language: English
- No. of seasons: 14

Production
- Production location: New York City
- Camera setup: Multi-camera
- Running time: 120 minutes (2012-2023); 60 minutes (2023-present)

Original release
- Network: Fox; Fox News
- Release: March 5, 2012 – present

Fox & Friends First is a breakfast television show on Fox and Fox News. It airs every weekday from 5-6 a.m. EST. The hour-long program hosted by Carley Shimkus and Todd Piro serves as a pre-show to the network's flagship morning show Fox & Friends.

The current incarnation of the show debuted on March 5, 2012, with Heather Childers and Ainsley Earhardt as the original hosts of the show.

== Hosts ==
Current

- Carley Shimkus, co-host (2021–present)
- Todd Piro, co-host (2020–present)
- Chanley Painter, news anchor (2024–present)

Former

- Ainsley Earhardt: co-host (2012–2016), left to co-host Fox & Friends (replaced by Rob Schmitt)
- Heather Childers: co-host (2012–2020), was pulled from the air in March 2020 (after being sick on air during the COVID-19 pandemic)
- Rob Schmitt: co-host (2016–2020), was absent from the show before announcing he no longer worked for the network (replaced by Todd Piro)
- Jillian Mele: co-host (2017–2021), left to pursue a degree in October 2021 (replaced by Carley Shimkus)
- Ashley Strohmier: news anchor (2020–2024), left to anchor Fox News @ Night (replaced by Chanley Painter)
- Brooke Singman, politics reporter (2021–2025)
- Janice Dean, meteorologist (2012–2026)

== Synopsis ==
The show devotes to new developments of the latest overnight headlines and/or continuous coverage of breaking news. Due to the nature and time of the show, guests rarely appear, so it focuses more on updates of news stories with correspondents, analysis from the hosts, and politics.

When Fox and Friends First launched in March 2012, the show's executive producer, Lauren Petterson, described the show to Fox News Insider this way: "Think of Fox and Friends First like Fox and Friends on steroids. It will include all of the things you love about Fox and Friends – at warp speed. A cheat sheet, if you will, to all the day's big stories…"

== Recurring segments/elements ==
- "Fox and Trends" – Chanley Painter shows the top three trending stories of the day
- "Weather" – Janice Dean presents the weather across the United States
- "Fox Business Headlines" – Cheryl Casone presents top stories that affect the markets
- "The Good, The Bad & The Ugly" – hosts report three headlines in the morning and rate them into a category

== Programming announcements and changes ==
In 2001, Fox & Friends, which aired from 7:00 am to 9:00 am Eastern Time Zone, was expanded by an hour to start at 6:00 am. The new hour was branded Fox & Friends First and was co-anchored by Alisyn Camerota. In July 2008, the 6:00 am hour was replaced by a third hour of Fox & Friends, and Camerota was named permanent anchor of the weekend edition of Fox & Friends.

In June 2011, rival cable news channel CNN began programming in the 5:00 am hour, with a one-hour extension of American Morning titled Wake Up Call, which was replaced in January 2012 following American Morning's cancellation by the two-hour Early Start. MSNBC already had started its news programming at that hour with two half-hour shows: Morning Joe First Look, a general news program which had aired since the mid-2000s, and Way Too Early (which leads into Morning Joe), which debuted in July 2009. In March 2012, Fox News confirmed that it was expanding its morning programming to begin at 5:00 am. The new one-hour show was named Fox & Friends First and serves as a lead-in to Fox & Friends. It debuted on March 5, 2012.

In its first week on the air, Fox & Friends First averaged more total viewers than other programs at CNN and MSNBC in the same time slot combined.

In October 2017, Fox News announced that the show will be expanded to two hours from 4:00 am to 6:00 am. The 4:00 am hour would be anchored solely by Heather Childers, and Jillian Mele and Rob Schmitt would present the 5:00 am hour. In July 2020, Childers had parted ways with Fox News after executives had expressed concern and anger about her coming to work and appearing visibly ill on air several months earlier during the wake of the COVID-19 pandemic. In 2021, Jillian Mele was replaced by Carley Shimkus as a co-anchor.

In June 2023, Fox News announced that the show would be ending its 4am EST hour and only broadcasting from 5–6am EST with Shimkus and Piro remaining as co-hosts.

== Location ==
Fox & Friends First is broadcast from Studio J at 1211 Avenue of the Americas (also known as the News Corp. Building), New York City. On March 19, 2018, Fox & Friends First has relocated to Studio D from its original location in Studio J for construction. The team moved back to Studio J on June 19, 2018.

Preceded by Sunday Night in America w/Trey Gowdy (replay) Monday; Gutfeld! (replay) Tuesday—Friday	Fox & Friends First; 5:00 am – 6:00 am ET	Succeeded by Fox & Friends
