= Heather Childers =

American television news anchor

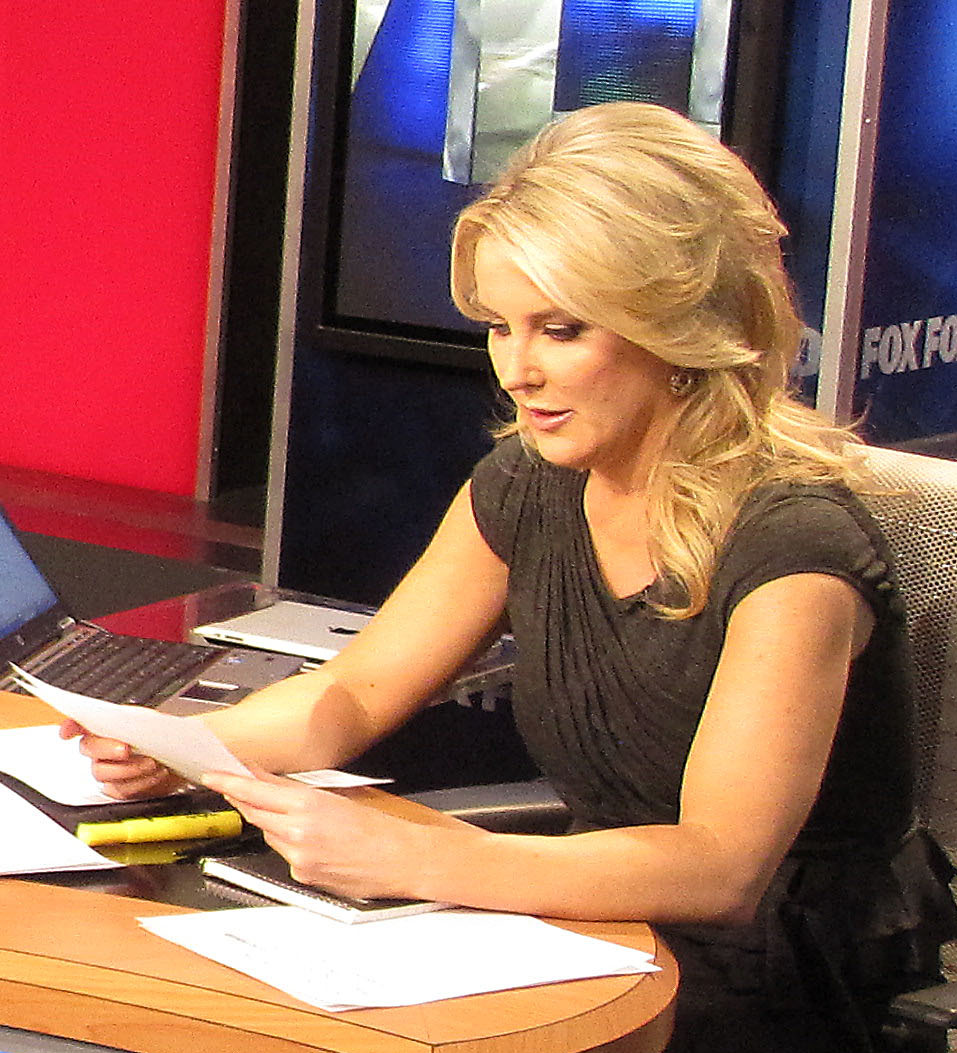
- Childers in 2012
- Born: Heather Star Childers; January 7, 1969 (age 57); Charlotte, North Carolina, U.S.
- Education: University of North Carolina at Chapel Hill (BA)
- Occupations: Television news anchor and correspondent
- Years active: 1992–present

Heather Star Childers is an American television news anchor. She was a former anchor of the first hour of Fox & Friends First for Fox News Channel, and worked for the organization from 2010 until 2020.

== Early life and education ==
Childers was born in Hartsville, South Carolina, and grew up in Charlotte, North Carolina. She graduated from Myers Park High School in 1987. Childers attended the University of North Carolina at Charlotte, then graduated from the University of North Carolina at Chapel Hill with an undergraduate degree in English.

== Television news career ==
Childers began her professional career at WCNC-TV in Charlotte as a producer and reporter in the early 1990s. She worked for television news stations in Albany, Georgia and then Asheville, North Carolina, at WLOS, the ABC affiliate there. She moved to News 14 Carolina in 2002 as an anchor.

Childers came to Fox News Channel in November 2010 as a reporter, and became an anchor for America's News Headquarters in August 2011. She later became an early-morning host at Fox; beginning in 2017, she was the host of the first installment of Fox & Friends First, from 4-5 a.m.

In April 2012, Childers posted a Twitter message linking to an article from a fringe website promoting "birther" conspiracy theories; the article suggested that the Barack Obama campaign had threatened the life of Chelsea Clinton if the Clintons spoke of "Obama's birth certificate or lack thereof." In response to criticism of the tweet, Childers said that she was "asking for opinion." Like other Fox News hosts, Childers has questioned the scientific consensus on climate change, suggesting on air in 2016 that "the science is still in question."

In March 2020, Fox News took Childers off the air after she came to work and appeared on air while ill during the COVID-19 pandemic. The network confirmed the termination of her contract in July 2020, after several months where she did not appear on the network. Childers had tested negative for COVID-19, and tweeted at the network several times to ask to return to her position. In November 2020, she began co-anchoring American Agenda alongside Bob Sellers on Newsmax TV.
