= Fox News =

American conservative cable news channel

Fox News Channel
- Country: United States
- Broadcast area: Worldwide; United States; Canada
- Headquarters: 1211 Avenue of the Americas; New York City, New York 10036

Programming
- Language: English
- Picture format: 720p (16:9 HDTV)

Ownership
- Owner: News Corporation (1996–2013); 21st Century Fox (2013–2019); Fox Corporation (2019–present)
- Parent: Fox News Media
- Sister channels: Fox Broadcasting Company; Fox Business; Fox Weather; FS1; FS2; LiveNOW from Fox; Fox Soul; MyNetworkTV

History
- Launched: October 7, 1996; 30 years ago

Links
- Website: foxnews.com

Availability

Streaming media
- Fox One: fox.com: (American cable internet subscribers only; requires subscription, trial, or television provider login to access content)
- Online stream: Fox News Go (pay-TV subscribers only)
- Service(s): DirecTV Stream, FuboTV, Fox One, Hulu + Live TV, Sling TV, YouTube TV

The Fox News Channel (FNC), often referred to as Fox News, is an American multinational conservative news and political commentary television channel and website based in New York City. Owned by the Fox News Media subsidiary of Fox Corporation, as of 2022, it is the most-watched cable news network in the United States, and as of 2023, it generates approximately 70% of its parent company's pre-tax profit. The channel broadcasts primarily from studios at 1211 Avenue of the Americas in Midtown Manhattan. Fox News provides service to 86 countries and territories, with international broadcasts featuring Fox Extra segments during advertising breaks.

The channel was created by Australian-born American media mogul Rupert Murdoch in 1996 to appeal to a conservative audience, hiring former Republican media consultant and CNBC executive Roger Ailes as its founding CEO. It launched on October 7, 1996 to 17 million cable subscribers. Fox News grew during the late 1990s and 2000s to become the dominant United States cable news subscription network. By September 2018, 87 million U.S. households (91% of television subscribers) could receive Fox News. In 2019, it was the top-rated cable network, averaging 2.5 million viewers in prime time. Murdoch, the executive chairman since 2016, said in 2023 that he would step down and hand responsibilities to his son, Lachlan. Suzanne Scott has been the CEO since 2018.

Fox News has been criticized for biased and false reporting in favor of the Republican Party, its politicians, and conservative causes, while portraying the Democratic Party in a negative light. Some researchers have argued that the channel is damaging to the integrity of news overall, and acts as the de facto broadcasting arm of the Republican Party. Since its formation, the channel has politically shifted further rightwards over time, and by 2016 became solidly pro-Trump.

The channel has knowingly endorsed false conspiracy theories to promote Republican and conservative causes. These include, but are not limited to, false claims regarding fraud with Dominion voting machines during their reporting on the 2020 presidential election, climate change denial, (Note: According to the fact-checking website Climate Feedback, Fox News is part of "a network of unreliable outlets for climate news.") and COVID-19 misinformation. It has also been involved in multiple controversies, including accusations of permitting sexual harassment and racial discrimination by on-air hosts, executives, and employees, ultimately paying out millions of dollars in legal settlements.

== History ==
In May 1985, Australian publisher Rupert Murdoch announced that he and American industrialist and philanthropist Marvin Davis intended to develop "a network of independent stations as a fourth marketing force" to directly compete with CBS, NBC, and ABC through the purchase of six television stations owned by Metromedia. In July 1985, 20th Century Fox announced Murdoch had completed his purchase of 50% of Fox Filmed Entertainment, the parent company of 20th Century Fox Film Corporation.

Subsequently, and prior to founding FNC, Murdoch had gained experience in the 24-hour news business when News Corporation's BSkyB subsidiary began Europe's first 24-hour news channel (Sky News) in the United Kingdom in 1989. With the success of his efforts establishing Fox as a TV network in the United States, experience gained from Sky News and the turnaround of 20th Century Fox, Murdoch announced on January 30, 1996, that News Corp. would launch a 24-hour news channel on cable and satellite systems in the United States as part of a News Corp. "worldwide platform" for Fox programming: "The appetite for news – particularly news that explains to people how it affects them – is expanding enormously".

In February 1996, after former U.S. Republican Party political strategist and NBC executive Roger Ailes left cable television channel America's Talking (now MS NOW), Murdoch asked him to start Fox News Channel. Ailes demanded five months of 14-hour workdays and several weeks of rehearsal shows before its launch on October 7, 1996.

At its debut, 17 million households were able to watch FNC; however, it was absent from the largest U.S. media markets of New York City and Los Angeles. Rolling news coverage during the day consisted of 20-minute single-topic shows such as Fox on Crime or Fox on Politics, surrounded by news headlines. Interviews featured facts at the bottom of the screen about the topic or the guest. The flagship newscast at the time was The Schneider Report, with Mike Schneider's fast-paced delivery of the news. During the evening, Fox featured opinion shows: The O'Reilly Report (later The O'Reilly Factor), The Crier Report (hosted by Catherine Crier) and Hannity & Colmes. From the beginning, FNC has placed heavy emphasis on visual presentation. Graphics were designed to be colorful and gain attention; this helped the viewer to grasp the main points of what was being said, even if they could not hear the host (with on-screen text summarizing the position of the interviewer or speaker, and "bullet points" when a host was delivering commentary). Fox News also created the "Fox News Alert", which interrupted its regular programming when a breaking news story occurred.

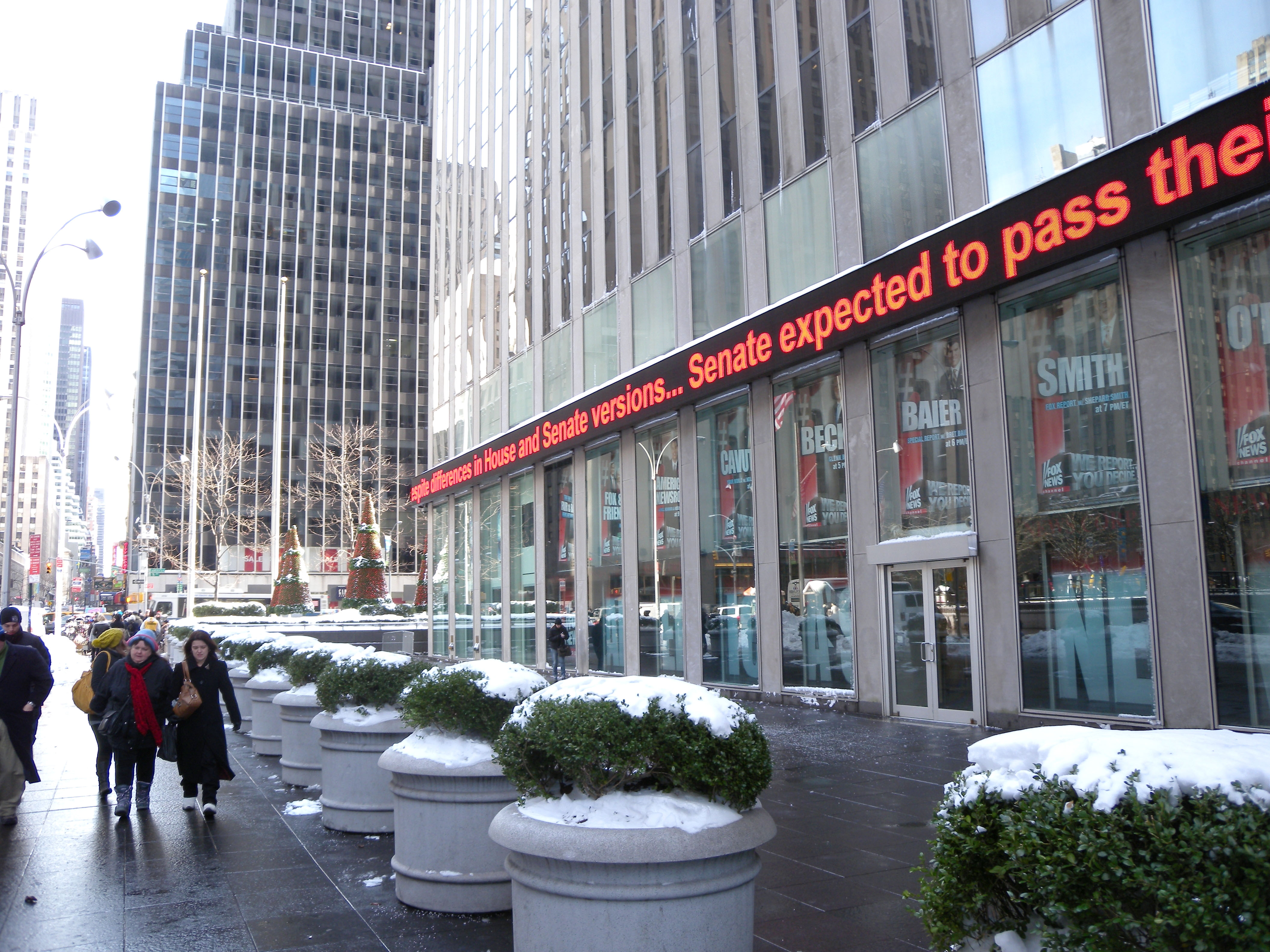
Fox News Studios in 2009

To accelerate its adoption by cable providers, Fox News paid systems up to $11 per subscriber to distribute the channel. This contrasted with the normal practice, in which cable operators paid stations carriage fees for programming. When Time Warner bought Ted Turner's Turner Broadcasting System, a federal antitrust consent decree required Time Warner to carry a second all-news channel in addition to its own CNN on its cable systems. Time Warner selected MSNBC as the secondary news channel, not Fox News. Fox News claimed this violated an agreement (to carry Fox News). Citing its agreement to keep its U.S. headquarters and a large studio in New York City, News Corporation enlisted the help of Mayor Rudolph Giuliani's administration to pressure Time Warner Cable (one of the city's two cable providers) to transmit Fox News on a city-owned channel. City officials threatened to take action affecting Time Warner's cable franchises in the city.

In 2001, during the September 11 attacks, Fox News was the first news organization to run a news ticker on the bottom of the screen to keep up with the flow of information that day. The ticker has remained, and has proven popular with viewers. In January 2002, Fox News surpassed CNN in ratings for the first time.

Accelerating in the 2000s, the role of conservative media and Fox News led to it being trusted by the Republican Party's base over that of traditional conservative elites, and partly led to Donald Trump's victory in the Republican primaries against the wishes of a very weak party establishment and traditional power brokers. Fox News subsequently became solidly pro-Trump, and cultivated deep ties between itself and the government. For his first term, nearly 20 current and former Fox News hosts received administrative and cabinet-level positions in his administration, and his second term also featured 23 current and former Fox News hosts appointed and nominated.

In 2023, The Economist reported that Murdoch had "ditched a plan" to remerge News Corporation with Fox because it "faced resistance from News Corp investors unhappy at the prospect of being lumped together with Fox News, which they consider a toxic brand." Later that year, Murdoch said he would step down and that his son Lachlan would take over both Fox Corporation and News Corp, although the succession was disputed legally. In September 2025, Lachlan Murdoch secured control of Fox News, the New York Post and The Wall Street Journal in a $3.3 billion deal as part of a renegotiated trust. The new trust and Lachlan's control was described as ensuring the channel's conservative slant until its expiration in 2050.

== Political alignment ==
Fox News has been identified as practicing biased and false reporting in favor of the Republican Party, its politicians, and conservative causes, while portraying the Democratic Party in a negative light. Fox News has been characterized by critics, commentators, and researchers as an advocacy news organization (Note: Multiple sources:) and as damaging to the integrity of news overall. It has been criticized for sharing propaganda. (Note: Multiple sources have described Fox News as propaganda including researchers, news organizations, Republican politicians, former Fox hosts and employees, and commentators.) The network is pro-Trump. During and after the 2020 presidential election, its primetime hosts promoted Trump and the Republican Party, and host Jeanine Pirro was in communication with the chair of the Republican National Committee.

By 2017, a growing number of studies and academic literature found Fox's prime-time programming engaging in rhetorical and nonfactual themes similar to propaganda and not journalism or persuasion. Academic studies have argued that it has played a major role in boosting Republican turnout in American elections and that its role in American politics has been underestimated by political and communications scholars. Fox has been described as operating in an information silo where its audience views other media sources as "too liberal", and thus rely on Fox and no other forms of news media. Researchers and commentators have compared conservative Fox News as similar in purpose to liberal MSNBC, but that "the proportion of Fox News statements that are mostly false or worse is almost 50 percent higher than for MSNBC, and more than twice that of CNN".

Its news coverage has gradually shifted further rightwards over time. Fox's most popular programs such as Hannity and Tucker Carlson Tonight do not make any claims to be accurate or fact-checked, and have little to no distinction between news and commentary. Media analyst Brian Stelter, who has written extensively about the network, observed in 2021 that in more recent years it had adjusted its programming to present "less news on the air and more opinions-about-the-news" throughout the day, on concerns it was losing viewers to more conservative competitors that were presenting such content.

== Outlets ==
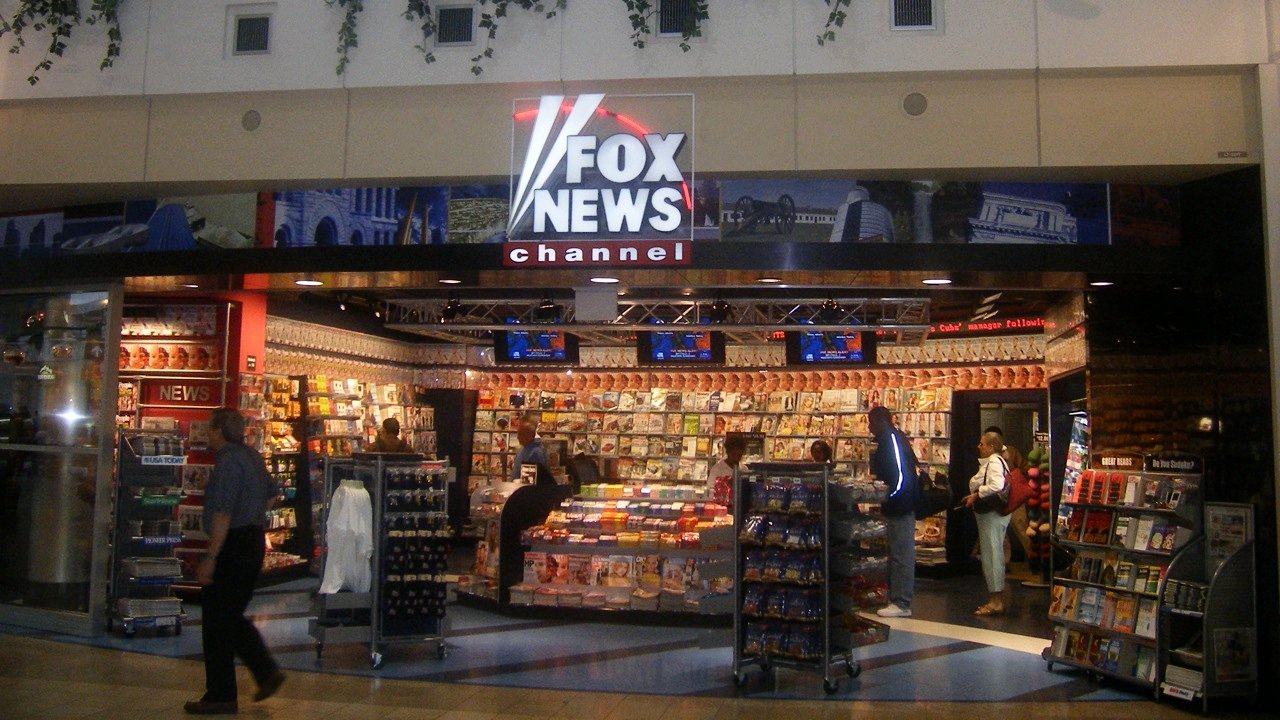
FNC airport newsstand at Minneapolis-Saint Paul International Airport

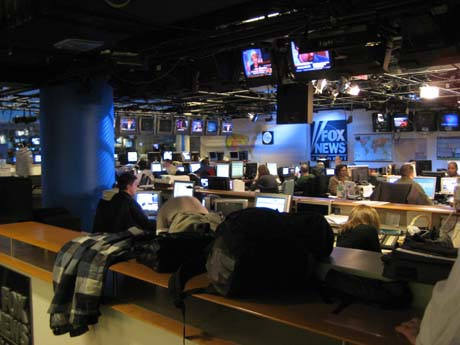
FNC's newsroom, November 15, 2007

FNC maintains an archive of most of its programs. This archive also includes Movietone News series of newsreels from its now Disney-owned namesake movie studio, 20th Century Studios. Licensing for the Fox News archive is handled by ITN Source, the archiving division of ITN.

=== Television ===
FNC presents a variety of programming, with up to 15 hours of live broadcasting per day in addition to programming and content for the Fox Broadcasting Company. Most programs are broadcast from Fox News headquarters in New York City (at 1211 Avenue of the Americas), in its streetside studio on Sixth Avenue in the west wing of Rockefeller Center, sharing its headquarters with sister channel Fox Business Network. Fox News Channel has eight studios at its New York City headquarters that are used for its and Fox Business's programming: Studio B (used for Fox Business programming), Studio D (which has an area for studio audiences; no longer in current use), Studio E (used for Gutfeld! and The Journal Editorial Report), Studio F (used for The Story with Martha MacCallum, The Five, Fox Democracy 2020, Fox & Friends, Outnumbered, The Faulkner Focus, and Fox News Primetime), Studio G (which houses Fox Business shows, The Fox Report, Your World with Neil Cavuto, and Cavuto Live), Studio H (Fox News Deck used for breaking news coverage, no longer in current use), Studio J (used for America's Newsroom, Hannity, Fox News Live, Fox & Friends First, and Sunday Morning Futures) Starting in 2018, Thursday Night Football had its pregame show, Fox NFL Thursday, originating from Studio F. Another Fox Sports program, First Things First, also broadcasts from Studio E.

Other such programs (such as Special Report with Bret Baier, The Ingraham Angle, Fox News @ Night, Media Buzz, and editions of Fox News Live not broadcast from the New York City studios) are broadcast from Fox News's Washington, D.C. studios, located on Capitol Hill across from Washington Union Station in a secured building shared by a number of other television networks, which includes NBC News and C-SPAN. The Next Revolution is broadcast from Fox News's Los Angeles bureau studio, which is also used for news updates coming from Los Angeles. Life, Liberty & Levin is done from Levin's personal studio in Virginia. Audio simulcasts of the channel are aired on SiriusXM Satellite Radio.

In an October 11, 2009, in a New York Times article, Fox said its hard-news programming runs from "9 AM to 4 PM and 6 to 8 PM on weekdays". However, it makes no such claims for its other broadcasts, which primarily consist of editorial journalism and commentary.

Fox News Channel began broadcasting in the 720p resolution format on May 1, 2008. This format is available on all major cable and satellite providers.

Fox News Media produces Fox News Sunday, which airs on Fox Broadcasting and re-airs on the Fox News Channel. Fox News also produces occasional special event coverage that is broadcast on Fox Business.

=== Radio ===
With the growth of the FNC, the company introduced a radio division, Fox News Radio, in 2003. Syndicated throughout the United States, the division provides short newscasts and talk radio programs featuring personalities from the television and radio divisions. In 2006, the company also introduced Fox News Talk, a satellite radio station featuring programs syndicated by (and featuring) Fox News personalities.

=== Online ===
Introduced in December 1995, the Fox News website features news articles and videos about national and international news. Content on the website is divided into politics, media, U.S., and business. Fox News's articles are based on the network's broadcasts, reports from Fox affiliates and articles produced by other news agencies, such as the Associated Press. Articles are usually accompanied by a video related to the article. Fox News Latino is the version aimed at a Hispanic audience, although presented almost entirely in English, with a Spanish section.

According to NewsGuard, "Much of FoxNews.com's content, particularly articles produced by beat reporters and broadcasts produced by network correspondents, is accurate and well-sourced ... However, FoxNews.com has regularly advanced false and misleading claims on topics including the Jan. 6, 2021, attack on the U.S. Capitol, the Russo-Ukrainian War, COVID-19, and U.S. elections".

In September 2008, FNC joined other channels in introducing a live streaming segment to its website: The Strategy Room, designed to appeal to older viewers. It airs weekdays from 9 AM to 5 PM and takes the form of an informal discussion, with running commentary on the news. Regular discussion programs include Business Hour, News With a View and God Talk. In March 2009, The Fox Nation was launched as a website intended to encourage readers to post articles commenting on the news. Fox News Mobile is the portion of the FNC website dedicated to streaming news clips formatted for video-enabled mobile phones.

=== Fox Nation ===
In 2018, Fox News announced that it would launch a subscription video on demand service known as Fox Nation. It serves as a companion service to FNC, carrying original and acquired talk, documentary, and reality programming designed to appeal to Fox News viewers. Some of its original programs feature Fox News personalities and contributors.

== Ratings and reception ==
In 2003, Fox News saw a large ratings jump during the early stages of the U.S. invasion of Iraq. At the height of the conflict, according to some reports, Fox News had as much as a 300% increase in viewership (averaging 3.3 million viewers daily). In 2004, Fox News's ratings for its broadcast of the Republican National Convention exceeded those of the three major broadcast networks. During President George W. Bush's address, Fox News attracted 7.3 million viewers nationally; NBC, ABC, and CBS had a viewership of 5.9 million, 5.1 million, and 5.0 million respectively.

Between late 2005 and early 2006, Fox News saw a brief decline in ratings. One was in the second quarter of 2006, when it lost viewers for every prime-time program compared with the previous quarter. The audience for Special Report with Brit Hume, for example, dropped 19%. Several weeks later, in the wake of the 2006 North Korean missile test and the 2006 Lebanon War, Fox saw a surge in viewership and remained the top-rated cable news channel. Fox produced eight of the top ten most-watched nightly cable news shows, with The O'Reilly Factor and Hannity & Colmes finishing first and second respectively.

FNC ranked No. 8 in viewership among all cable channels in 2006, and No. 7 in 2007. The channel ranked number one during the week of Barack Obama's election (November 3–9) in 2008, and reached the top spot again in January 2010 (during the week of the special Senate election in Massachusetts). Comparing Fox to its 24-hour-news-channel competitors in May 2010, the channel drew an average daily prime-time audience of 1.8 million viewers (versus 747,000 for MSNBC and 595,000 for CNN).

In September 2009, the Pew Research Center published a report on the public view of national news organizations. In the report, 72% of polled Republican Fox viewers rated the channel as "favorable", while 43% of polled Democratic viewers and 55% of all polled viewers shared that opinion. However, Fox was given the highest "unfavorable" rating of all national outlets studied (25% of all polled viewers). The report went on to say that "partisan differences in views of Fox News have increased substantially since 2007". A January 2020 Pew Research Center study found that 43% of all American adults trusted Fox News, including 65% of Republicans and people who lean Republican, while 61% of Democrats and people who lean Democratic distrusted Fox News.

A Public Policy Polling poll concluded in 2013 that positive perceptions of FNC had declined from 2010. 41% of polled voters said they trust it, down from 49% in 2010, while 46% said they distrust it, up from 37% in 2010. It was also called the "most trusted" network by 34% of those polled, more than had said the same of any other network.

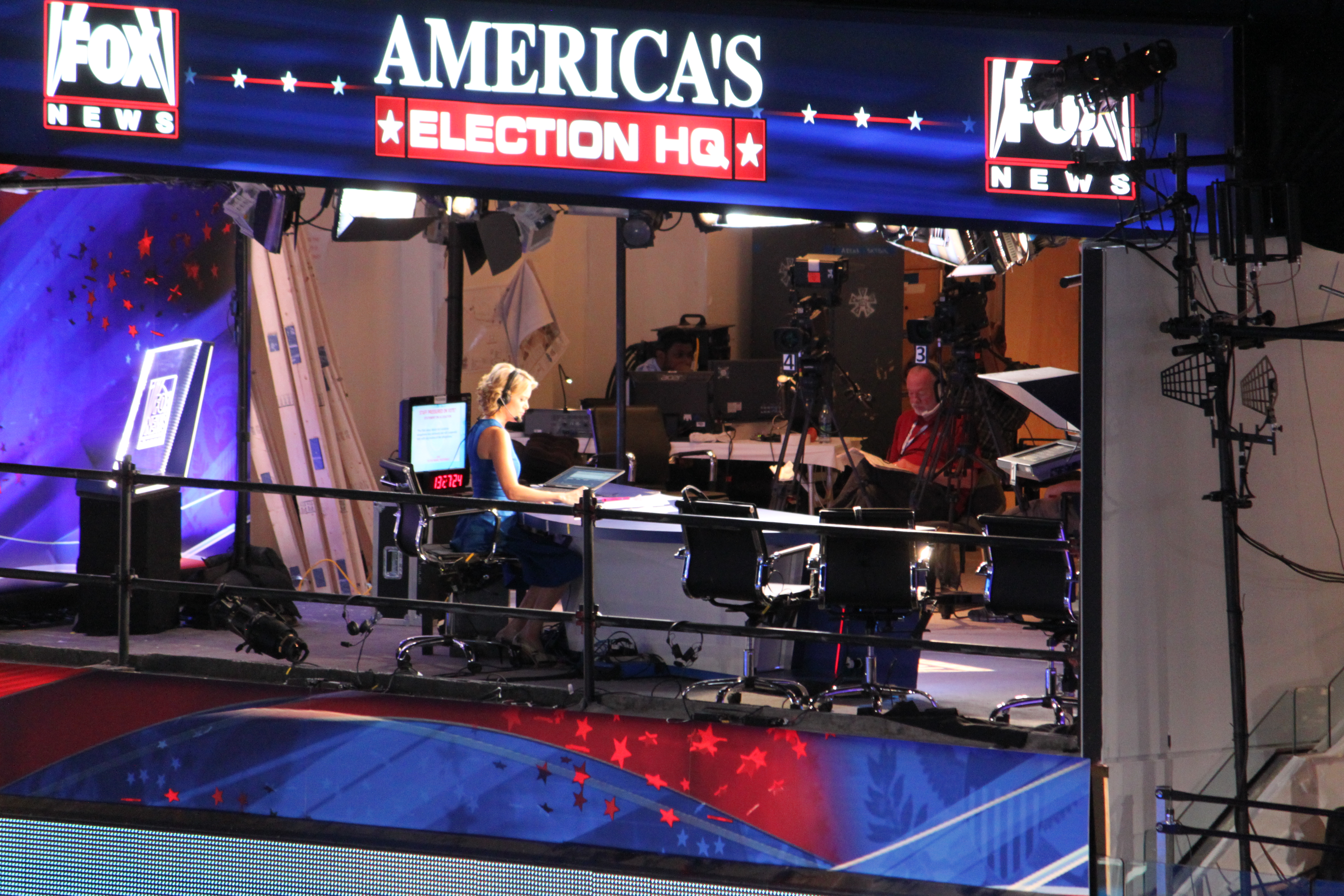
Then-Fox anchor Megyn Kelly covering the 2012 Democratic National Convention

On the night of October 22, 2012, Fox set a record for its highest-rated telecast, with 11.5 million viewers for the third U.S. presidential debate. In prime time the week before, Fox averaged almost 3.7 million viewers with a total day average of 1.66 million viewers.

In prime time and total day ratings for the week of April 15 to 21, 2013, Fox News, propelled by its coverage of the Boston Marathon bombing, was the highest-ranked network on U.S. cable television, for the first time since August 2005, when Hurricane Katrina hit the Gulf Coast of the United States. January 2014 marked Fox News's 145th consecutive month as the highest-rated cable news channel. During that month, Fox News beat CNN and MSNBC combined in overall viewers in both prime time hours and the total day. In the third quarter of 2014, the network was the most-watched cable channel during prime time hours. During the final week of the campaign for the United States elections, 2014, Fox News had the highest ratings of any cable channel, news or otherwise. On election night itself, Fox News's coverage had higher ratings than that of any of the other five cable or network news sources among viewers between 25 and 54 years of age. The network hosted the first prime-time GOP candidates' forum of the 2016 campaign on August 6. The debate reached a record-breaking 24 million viewers, by far the largest audience for any cable news event.

A 2017 study by the Berkman Klein Center for Internet & Society at Harvard University found that Fox News was the third most-shared source among supporters of Donald Trump on Twitter during the 2016 presidential election, behind The Hill and Breitbart News.

In 2018, Fox News was rated by Nielsen as America's most watched cable network, averaging a record 2.4 million viewers in prime time and total day during the period of January 1 to December 30, 2018. In an October 2018 Simmons Research survey of the trust in 38 news organizations, Fox News was ranked roughly in the center, with 44.7% of surveyed Americans saying they trusted it.

The COVID-19 pandemic led to increased viewership for all cable news networks. For the first calendar quarter of 2020 (January 1 – March 31), Fox News had their highest-rated quarter in the network's history, with Nielsen showing a prime time average total audience of 3.387 million viewers. Sean Hannity's program, Hannity, weeknights at 9 pm ET was the top-rated show in cable news for the quarter averaging 4.2 million viewers, a figure that not only beat out all of its cable news competition but also placed it ahead of network competition in the same time slot. Fox ended the quarter with the top five shows in prime time, with Fox's Tucker Carlson Tonight finishing the quarter in second overall with an average audience of 4.2 million viewers, followed by The Five, The Ingraham Angle, and Special Report with Bret Baier. The Rachel Maddow Show was the highest non-Fox show on cable, coming in sixth place. Finishing the quarter in 22nd place was The Lead with Jake Tapper, CNN's highest rated show. According to a Fox News article on the subject, Fox & Friends averaged 1.8 million viewers, topping CNN's New Day and MSNBC's Morning Joe combined. The same Fox News article said that the Fox Business Network also had its highest-rated quarter in history and that Fox News finished March as the highest-rated network in cable for the 45th consecutive month.

According to the Los Angeles Times on August 19, 2020: "Fox News Channel had six of last week's 11 highest-rated prime-time programs to finish first in the network ratings race for the third time since June" 2020.

A Morning Consult survey the week after Election Day 2020 showed 30 percent of Republicans in the United States had an unfavorable opinion of Fox News, while 54 percent of Republicans viewed the network favorably, compared to 67 percent before the election. A McClatchy news story suggested criticism from Donald Trump as a major reason, as well as the network's early calling of Arizona for Joe Biden, and later joining other networks in declaring Biden the winner of the 2020 election.

Ratings were also down for Fox News. Although it remained ahead of other networks overall, its morning show fell out of first place for the first time since 2001. Trump recommended OANN, which was gaining viewers. Newsmax was also increasing in popularity.

Following a decline in ratings after the 2020 U.S. presidential election, in 2021, Fox News regained its lead in cable news ratings ahead of CNN and MSNBC.

=== Demographics ===
As indicated by a 2013 New York Times article, based on Nielsen statistics, Fox appears to have a mostly aged demographic. In March 2024, Fox was the most watched news network in total day and prime time viewers in primetime, with 2.135 million/1.306 million viewers respectively, compared to MSNBC with A25-54 demo, 1.307 million in primetime and 830,000 in day viewers, and CNN with 601,000 in primetime and 462,000 in day viewers. In the Adults age 25-54 category, Fox also leads with 246,000 in primetime and 158,000 in day viewers, followed by MSNBC with 133,000 viewers in primetime and 86,000 viewers in day, and CNN with 124,000 viewers in primetime and 85,000 in day viewers. According to the same Nielsen analysis, MSNBC is the second most watched news network.

In 2008, in the 25–54 age group, Fox News had an average of 557,000 viewers, but dropped to 379,000 in 2013 while increasing its overall audience from 1.89 million in 2010 to 2.02 million in 2013. The median age of a prime-time viewer was 68 as of 2015. A 2019 Pew Research Center survey showed that among those who named Fox News as their main source for political news, 69% are aged 50 or older.

According to a 2013 Gallup poll, 94% of Fox viewers "either identify as or lean Republican". The 2019 Pew survey showed that among people who named Fox News as their main source for political and election news, 93% identify as Republicans. Among the top eight political news sources named by at least 2% of American adults, the results show Fox News and MSNBC as the two news channels with the most partisan audiences.

== Slogan ==
Fox News Channel originally used the slogan "Fair and Balanced", which was coined by network co-founder Roger Ailes while the network was being established. The New York Times described the slogan as being a "blunt signal that Fox News planned to counteract what Mr. Ailes and many others viewed as a liberal bias ingrained in television coverage by establishment news networks". In a 2013 interview with Peter Robinson of the Hoover Institution, Rupert Murdoch defended the company's "Fair and Balanced" slogan, saying, "In fact, you'll find just as many Democrats as Republicans on and so on".

In August 2003, Fox News sued comedian Al Franken over his use of the slogan as a subtitle for his book, Lies and the Lying Liars Who Tell Them: A Fair and Balanced Look at the Right, which is critical of Fox News Channel. The lawsuit was dropped three days later, after Judge Denny Chin refused its request for an injunction. In his decision, Chin ruled the case was "wholly without merit, both factually and legally". He went on to suggest that Fox News's trademark on the phrase "fair and balanced" could be invalid. In December 2003, FNC won a legal battle concerning the slogan, when AlterNet filed a cancellation petition with the United States Patent and Trademark Office (USPTO) to have FNC's trademark rescinded as inaccurate. AlterNet included Robert Greenwald's documentary film Outfoxed (2004) as supporting evidence in its case. After losing early motions, AlterNet withdrew its petition; the USPTO dismissed the case. In 2008, FNC used the slogan "We Report, You Decide", referring to "You Decide 2008" (FNC's original slogan for its coverage of election issues).

In August 2016, Fox News Channel began to quietly phase out the "Fair and Balanced" slogan in favor of "Most Watched, Most Trusted"; when these changes were reported in June 2017 by Gabriel Sherman (a writer who had written a biography on Ailes), a network executive said the change "has nothing to do with programming or editorial decisions". It was speculated by media outlets that Fox News Channel was wishing to distance itself from Ailes's tenure at the network.

In March 2018, the network introduced a new promotional campaign, "Real News. Real Honest Opinion", which highlighted personalities from its news- and opinion-based programming. The following year, Fox News Channel launched the campaign "America is Watching", which is used primarily to emphasize the network's viewership. In mid-November 2020, following the election, Fox News began to use the tagline "Standing Up For What's Right" to promote its primetime lineup.

== Content ==
=== Benghazi attack and aftermath ===
Fox News provided extensive coverage of the 2012 Benghazi attack, which host Sean Hannity described in December 2012 as "the story that the mainstream media ignores" and "obviously, a cover-up. And we will get to the bottom of it." Programming analysis by media watchdog Media Matters, which has declared a "War on Fox News", found that during the twenty months following the Benghazi attacks, FNC ran 1,098 segments on the issue, including:

- 478 segments involving Susan Rice's September 16, 2012, Sunday news show appearances, during which she was falsely accused of lying
- 382 segments on Special Report, the network's flagship news program
- 281 segments alleging a "cover-up" by the Obama administration
- 144 interviews of GOP members of Congress, but five interviews of Democratic members of Congress and Obama administration officials
- 120 comparisons to Iran-Contra, Watergate, and the actions of the Nixon administration
- 100 segments falsely suggesting the administration issued a "stand-down order" to prevent a rescue operation in Benghazi

Over nearly four years after the Benghazi attack, there were ten official investigations, including six by Republican-controlled House committees. None of the investigations found any evidence of scandal, cover-up or lying by Obama administration officials.

=== Uranium One ===
From 2015 into 2018, Fox News broadcast extensive coverage of an alleged scandal surrounding the sale of Uranium One to Russian interests, which host Sean Hannity characterized as "one of the biggest scandals in American history". According to Media Matters, the Fox News coverage extended throughout the programming day, with particular emphasis by Hannity. The network promoted an ultimately unfounded narrative asserting that, as Secretary of State, Hillary Clinton personally approved the Uranium One sale in exchange for $145 million in bribes paid to the Clinton Foundation. Donald Trump repeated these allegations as a candidate and as president. No evidence of wrongdoing by Clinton had been found after four years of allegations, an FBI investigation, and the 2017 appointment of a Federal attorney to evaluate the investigation. In November 2017, Fox News host Shepard Smith concisely debunked the alleged scandal, infuriating viewers who suggested he should work for CNN or MSNBC. Hannity later called Smith "clueless", while Smith stated: "I get it, that some of our opinion programming is there strictly to be entertaining. I get that. I don't work there. I wouldn't work there."

=== Pro-Republican and pro-Trump bias ===
Fox News has been described as broadcasting content designed to provoke negative emotional responses that align with political or other narratives.

Fox News has been described as conservative media, and as providing biased reporting in favor of conservative political positions, the Republican Party, and President Donald Trump. Political scientist Jonathan Bernstein described Fox News as an expanded part of the Republican Party. Political scientists Matt Grossmann and David A. Hopkins wrote that Fox News helped "Republicans communicate with their base and spread their ideas, and they have been effective in mobilizing voters to participate in midterm elections (as in 2010 and 2014)." Prior to 2000, Fox News lacked an ideological tilt, and had more Democrats watch the channel than Republicans. During the 2004 United States presidential election, Fox News was markedly more hostile in its coverage of Democratic presidential nominee John Kerry, and distinguished itself among cable news outlets for heavy coverage of the Swift Boat smear campaign against Kerry. During President Obama's first term in office, Fox News helped launch and amplify the Tea Party movement, a conservative movement within the Republican Party that organized protests against Obama and his policies. In the 2004 documentary Outfoxed, four people identified as former employees said that Fox News made them "slant the news in favor of conservatives". Fox News said that the film misrepresented the employment of these employees.

During the Republican primaries, Fox News was perceived as trying to prevent Trump from clinching the nomination. Under Trump's presidency, Fox News remade itself into his image, as hardly any criticism of Trump could be heard on Fox News's prime-time shows. In Fox News's news reporting, the network dedicated far more coverage to Hillary Clinton-related stories, which critics argued was intended to deflect attention from the investigation into Russian interference in the 2016 United States elections. Trump provided significant access to Fox News during his presidency, giving 19 interviews to the channel while only 6 in total to other news channels by November 2017; The New York Times described Trump's Fox News interviews as "softball interviews" and some of the interviewers' interview styles as "fawning". In July 2018, The Economist has described the network's coverage of Trump's presidency as "reliably fawning". From 2015 to 2017, the Fox News prime-time lineup changed from being skeptical and questioning of Trump to a "Trump safe space, with a dose of Bannonist populism once considered on the fringe". The Fox News website has also become more extreme in its rhetoric since Trump's election; according to Columbia University's Tow Center for Digital Journalism, the Fox News website has "gone a little Breitbart" over time. At the start of 2018, Fox News mostly ignored high-profile scandals in the Trump administration which received ample coverage in other national media outlets, such as White House Staff Secretary Rob Porter's resignation amid domestic abuse allegations, the downgrading of Jared Kushner's security clearance, and the existence of a non-disclosure agreement between Trump and the porn star Stormy Daniels.

In March 2019, Jane Mayer reported in The New Yorker that Fox News.com reporter Diana Falzone had the story of the Stormy Daniels–Donald Trump scandal before the 2016 election, but that Fox News executive Ken LaCorte told her: "Good reporting, kiddo. But Rupert [Murdoch] wants Donald Trump to win. So just let it go." The story was killed; LaCorte denied making the statement to Falzone, but conceded: "I was the person who made the call. I didn't run it upstairs to Roger Ailes or others. ... I didn't do it to protect Donald Trump." She added that "[Falzone] had put up a story that just wasn't anywhere close to being something I was comfortable publishing." Nik Richie, who claimed to be one of the sources for the story, called LaCorte's account "complete bullshit", adding that "Fox News was culpable. I voted for Trump, and I like Fox, but they did their own 'catch and kill' on the story to protect him."

A 2008 study found Fox News gave disproportionate attention to polls suggesting low approval for President Bill Clinton. A 2009 study found Fox News was less likely to pick up stories that reflected well on Democrats, and more likely to pick up stories that reflected well on Republicans. A 2010 study comparing Fox News Channel's Special Report With Brit Hume and NBC's Nightly News coverage of the wars in Iraq and Afghanistan during 2005 concluded "Fox News was much more sympathetic to the administration than NBC", suggesting "if scholars continue to find evidence of a partisan or ideological bias at FNC ... they should consider Fox as alternative, rather than mainstream, media".

Research finds that Fox News increases Republican vote shares and makes Republican politicians more partisan. A 2007 study, using the introduction of Fox News into local markets (1996–2000) as an instrumental variable, found that in the 2000 presidential election "Republicans gained 0.4 to 0.7 percentage points in the towns that broadcast Fox News", suggesting "Fox News convinced 3 to 28 percent of its viewers to vote Republican, depending on the audience measure". These results were confirmed by a 2015 study. A 2014 study, using the same instrumental variable, found congressional "representatives become less supportive of President Clinton in districts where Fox News begins broadcasting than similar representatives in similar districts where Fox News was not broadcast." Another 2014 paper found Fox News viewing increased Republican vote shares among voters who identified as Republican or independent. A 2017 study, using channel positions as an instrumental variable, found "Fox News increases Republican vote shares by 0.3 points among viewers induced into watching 2.5 additional minutes per week by variation in position." This study used a different methodology for a later period and found an ever bigger effect and impact, leading Matthew Yglesias to write in the Political Communication academic journal that they "suggest that conventional wisdom may be greatly underestimating the significance of Fox as a factor in American politics."

Fox News publicly denies it is biased, with Murdoch and Ailes saying to have included Murdoch's statement that Fox has "given room to both sides, whereas only one side had it before". In June 2009, Fox News host Chris Wallace said: "I think we are the counter-weight [to NBC News] ... they have a liberal agenda, and we tell the other side of the story." In 2004, Robert Greenwald's documentary film Outfoxed: Rupert Murdoch's War on Journalism argued Fox News had a conservative bias and featured clips from Fox News and internal memos from editorial vice president John Moody directing Fox News staff on how to report certain subjects. Fox News's most popular programs such as Sean Hannity and Tucker Carlson do not make any claims to be accurate or fact-checked, and have little to no distinction between news and commentary.

A leaked memo from Fox News vice president Bill Sammon to news staff at the height of the health care reform in the United States debate has been cited as an example of the pro-Republican bias of Fox News. His memo asked the staff to "use the term 'government-run health insurance,' or, when brevity is a concern, 'government option,' whenever possible". The memo was sent shortly after Republican pollster Frank Luntz advised Sean Hannity on his Fox show: "If you call it a public option, the American people are split. If you call it the government option, the public is overwhelmingly against it."

Surveys suggest Fox News is widely perceived to be ideological. A 2009 Pew survey found Fox News is viewed as the most ideological channel in America, with 47 percent of those surveyed said Fox News is "mostly conservative", 14 percent said "mostly liberal" and 24 percent said "neither". In comparison, MSNBC had 36 percent identify it as "mostly liberal", 11 percent as "mostly conservative" and 27 percent as "neither". CNN had 37 percent describe it as "mostly liberal", 11 percent as "mostly conservative" and 33 percent as "neither". A 2004 Pew Research Center survey found FNC was cited (unprompted) by 69 percent of national journalists as a conservative news organization. A Rasmussen poll found 31 percent of Americans felt Fox News had a conservative bias, and 15 percent that it had a liberal bias. It found 36 percent believed Fox News delivers news with neither a conservative or liberal bias, compared with 37 percent who said NPR delivers news with no conservative or liberal bias and 32 percent who said the same of CNN.

David Carr, media critic for The New York Times, praised the 2012 United States presidential election results coverage on Fox News for the network's response to Republican adviser and Fox News contributor Karl Rove challenging its call that Barack Obama would win Ohio and the election. Fox's prediction was correct. Carr wrote: "Over many months, Fox lulled its conservative base with agitprop: that President Obama was a clear failure, that a majority of Americans saw [Mitt] Romney as a good alternative in hard times, and that polls showing otherwise were politically motivated and not to be believed. But on Tuesday night, the people in charge of Fox News were confronted with a stark choice after it became clear that Mr. Romney had fallen short: was Fox, first and foremost, a place for advocacy or a place for news? In this moment, at least, Fox chose news."

A May 2017 study conducted by Harvard University's Shorenstein Center on Media, Politics and Public Policy examined coverage of Trump's first 100 days in office by several major mainstream media outlets including Fox. It found Trump received 80% negative coverage from the overall media, and received the least negative coverage on Fox – 52% negative and 48% positive.

On March 14, 2017, Andrew Napolitano, a Fox News commentator, claimed on Fox & Friends that British intelligence agency GCHQ had wiretapped Trump on behalf of Barack Obama during the 2016 United States presidential election. On March 16, 2017, White House spokesman Sean Spicer repeated the claim. When Trump was questioned about the claim at a news conference, he said "All we did was quote a certain very talented legal mind who was the one responsible for saying that on television. I didn't make an opinion on it." On March 17, 2017, Shepard Smith, a Fox News anchor, admitted the network had no evidence that Trump was under surveillance. British officials said the White House was backing off the claim. Napolitano was later suspended by Fox News for making the claim.

In June 2018, Fox News executives instructed producers to head off inappropriate remarks made on the shows aired by the network by hosts and commentators. The instructions came after a number of Fox News hosts and guests made incendiary comments about the Trump administration's policy of separating migrant children from their parents. Fox News host Laura Ingraham had likened the child detention centers that the children were in to "summer camps". Guest Corey Lewandowski mocked the story of a 10-year-old child with Down syndrome being separated from her mother; the Fox News host did not address Lewandowski's statement. Guest Ann Coulter falsely claimed that the separated children were "child actors"; the Fox News host did not challenge her claim. In a segment on Trump's alleged use of racial dog whistles, one Fox News contributor told an African-American whom he was debating: "You're out of your cotton-picking mind."

According to the 2016 book Asymmetric Politics by political scientists Matt Grossmann and David A. Hopkins, "Fox News tends to raise the profile of scandals and controversies involving Democrats that receive scant attention in other media, such as the relationship between Barack Obama and William Ayers ... Hillary Clinton's role in the fatal 2012 attacks on the American consulate in Benghazi, Libya; the gun-running scandal known as 'Fast and Furious'; the business practices of federal loan guarantee recipient Solyndra; the past activism of Obama White House operative Van Jones; the 2004 attacks on John Kerry by the Swift Boat Veterans for Truth; the controversial sermons of Obama's Chicago pastor Jeremiah Wright; the filming of undercover videos of supposed wrongdoing by the liberal activist group ACORN; and the 'war on Christmas' supposedly waged every December by secular, multicultural liberals."

In October 2018, Fox News ran laudatory coverage of a meeting between Trump-supporting rapper Kanye West and President Trump in the Oval Office. Fox News had previously run negative coverage of rappers and their involvement with Democratic politicians and causes, such as when Fox News ran headlines describing conscious hip-hop artist Common as "vile" and a "cop-killer rapper", and when Fox News ran negative coverage of Kanye West before he became a Trump supporter.

On November 4, 2018, Trump's website, DonaldJTrump.com, announced in a press release that Fox News host Sean Hannity would make a "special guest appearance" with Trump at a midterm campaign rally the following night in Cape Girardeau, Missouri. The following morning, Hannity tweeted "To be clear, I will not be on stage campaigning with the President." Hannity appeared at the president's lectern on stage at the rally, immediately mocking the "fake news" at the back of the auditorium, Fox News reporters among them. Several Fox News employees expressed outrage at Hannity's actions, with one stating that "a new line was crossed". Hannity later asserted that his action was not pre-planned, and Fox News stated it "does not condone any talent participating in campaign events". Fox News host Jeanine Pirro also appeared on stage with Trump at the rally. The Trump press release was later removed from Trump's website.

Fox News released a poll of registered voters, jointly conducted by two polling organizations, on June 16, 2019. The poll found some unfavorable results for Trump, including a record high 50% thought the Trump campaign had coordinated with the Russian government, and 50% thought he should be impeached – 43% saying he should also be removed from office – while 48% said they did not favor impeachment. The next morning on Fox & Friends First, host Heather Childers twice misrepresented the poll results, stating "a new Fox News poll shows most voters don't want impeachment" and "at least half of U.S. voters do not think President Trump should be impeached," while the on-screen display of the actual poll question was also incorrect. Later that morning on America's Newsroom, the on-screen display showed the correct poll question and results, but highlighted the 48% of respondents who opposed impeachment rather than the 50% who supported it (the latter being broken-out into two figures). As host Bill Hemmer drew guest Byron York's attention to the 48% opposed figure, they did not discuss the 50% support figure, while the on-screen chyron read: "Fox News Poll: 43% Support Trump's Impeachment and Removal, 48% Oppose." Later that day, Trump tweeted: "@FoxNews Polls are always bad for me...Something weird going on at Fox."

In April 2017, it became known that former Obama administration national security advisor Susan Rice sought the unmasking of Trump associates who were unidentified in intelligence reports, notably Trump's incoming national security advisor Michael Flynn, during the presidential transition. In May 2020, acting Director of National Intelligence Richard Grenell, a Trump loyalist, declassified a list of Obama administration officials who had also requested unmasking of Trump associates, which was subsequently publicly released by Republican senators. That month, attorney general Bill Barr appointed federal prosecutor John Bash to examine the unmaskings. Fox News primetime hosts declared the unmaskings a "domestic spying operation" for which the Obama administration was "exposed" in the "biggest abuse of power" in American history. The Bash inquiry closed months later with no findings of substantive wrongdoing.

However, certain Fox personalities have not had as much of a favorable reception from Trump: news anchors Shepard Smith (who retired from Fox in 2019) and Chris Wallace have been criticized by Trump for allegedly being adversarial, alongside Fox analyst Andrew Napolitano, who said Trump's actions in the Trump–Ukraine scandal were "both criminal and impeachable behavior". Trump was also critical of the network hiring former DNC chair Donna Brazile, in 2019. The relationship between Trump and Fox News, as well as other Rupert Murdoch-controlled outlets, soured following the 2020 United States presidential election, as Trump refused to concede that Joe Biden had been elected President-elect. This negative tonal shift led to increased viewership of Newsmax and One America News among Trump and his supporters due to their increased antipathy towards Fox; and as a result, Fox released promotional videos of their opinion hosts disputing the election results, promoting a Trump-affiliated conspiracy theory about voter fraud. By one measure, Newsmax saw a 497% spike in viewership, while Fox News saw a 38% decline.

Writing for the Poynter Institute for Media Studies in February 2021, senior media writer Tom Jones argued that the primary distinction between Fox News and MSNBC is not right bias vs. left bias, but rather that much of the content on Fox News, especially during its primetime programs, "is not based in truth".

The Tampa Bay Times reported in August 2021 that it had reviewed four months of emails indicating Fox News producers had coordinated with aides of Florida governor Ron DeSantis to promote his political prospects by inviting him for frequent network appearances, exchanging talking points and, in one case, helping him to stage an exclusive news event.

In February 2024, Alan Rosenblatt of Johns Hopkins University said that Fox News "is an entertainment company that has a news division, not a news company", adding that it "not only does not provide that distinction, it goes out of its way to make it difficult to see the difference. They make their opinion programs look like news programs, and they incorporate enough opinion content on their news programs to further that deception."

In early 2024, Fox News host Jesse Watters promoted a conspiracy theory involving Taylor Swift, Travis Kelce, and the Democratic Party in hopes of influencing voters ahead of the U.S. presidential primary season.

Fox News has published headlines accusing the English Wikipedia of having a left-wing and socialist bias.

=== Coverage of Russia investigation ===
On October 30, 2017, when special counsel Robert Mueller indicted Paul Manafort and Rick Gates, and revealed George Papadopoulos had pleaded guilty (all of whom were involved in the Trump 2016 campaign), this was the focus of most media's coverage, except Fox News'. Hosts and guests on Fox News called for Mueller to be fired. Sean Hannity and Tucker Carlson focused their shows on unsubstantiated allegations that Clinton sold uranium to Russia in exchange for donations to the Clinton Foundation and on the Clinton campaign's role in funding the Steele dossier. Hannity asserted: "The very thing they are accusing President Trump of doing, they did it themselves." During the segment, Hannity mistakenly referred to Clinton as President Clinton. Fox News dedicated extensive coverage to the uranium story, which Democrats said was an attempt to distract from Mueller's intensifying investigation. CNN described the coverage as "a tour de force in deflection and dismissal". On October 31, CNN reported Fox News employees were dissatisfied with their outlet's coverage of the Russia investigation, with employees calling it an "embarrassment", "laughable", and saying it "does the viewer a huge disservice and further divides the country" and that it is "another blow to journalists at Fox who come in every day wanting to cover the news in a fair and objective way".

When the investigation by special counsel Robert Mueller into Russian interference in the 2016 presidential election intensified in October 2017, the focus of Fox News coverage turned "what they see as the scandal and wrongdoing of President Trump's political opponents. In reports like these, Bill and Hillary Clinton are prominent and recurring characters because they are considered the real conspirators working with the Russians to undermine American democracy." Paul Waldman of The Washington Post described the coverage as "No puppet. You're the puppet", saying it was a "careful, coordinated, and comprehensive strategy" to distract from Mueller's investigation. German Lopes of Vox said Fox News's coverage has reached "levels of self-parody" as it dedicated coverage to low-key stories, such as a controversial Newsweek op-ed and hamburger emojis, while other networks had wall-to-wall coverage of Mueller's indictments.

A FiveThirtyEight analysis of Russia-related media coverage in cable news found most mentions of Russia on Fox News were spoken in close proximity to "uranium" and "dossier". On November 1, 2017, Vox analyzed the transcripts of Fox News, CNN and MSNBC, and found Fox News "was unable to talk about the Mueller investigation without bringing up Hillary Clinton", "talked significantly less about George Papadopoulos—the Trump campaign adviser whose plea deal with Mueller provides the most explicit evidence thus far that the campaign knew of the Russian government's efforts to help Trump—than its competitors", and "repeatedly called Mueller's credibility into question".

In December 2017, Fox News escalated its attacks on the Mueller investigation, with hosts and guest commentators suggesting the investigation amounted to a coup. Guest co-host Kevin Jackson referred to a right-wing conspiracy theory claiming Strzok's messages are evidence of a plot by FBI agents to assassinate Trump, a claim which the other Fox co-hosts quickly said is not supported by any credible evidence. Fox News host Jeanine Pirro called the Mueller investigation team a "criminal cabal" and said the team ought to be arrested. Other Fox News figures referred to the investigation as "corrupt", "crooked", and "illegitimate", and likened the FBI to the KGB, the Soviet-era spy organization that routinely tortured and summarily executed people. Political scientists and scholars of coups described the Fox News rhetoric as scary and dangerous. Experts on coups rejected that the Mueller investigation amounted to a coup; rather, the Fox News rhetoric was dangerous to democracy and mirrored the kind of rhetoric that occurs before purges. A number of observers argued the Fox News rhetoric was intended to discredit the Mueller investigation and sway President Donald Trump to fire Mueller.

In August 2018, Fox News was criticized for giving more prominent coverage of a murder committed by an undocumented immigrant than the convictions of Donald Trump's former campaign manager, Paul Manafort, and his long-term personal attorney, Michael Cohen. At the same time, most other national mainstream media gave wall-to-wall coverage of the convictions. Fox News hosts Dana Perrino and Jason Chaffetz argued that voters care far more about the murder than the convictions of the President's former top aides, and hosts Tucker Carlson and Sean Hannity downplayed the convictions.

=== False claims about other media ===
==== CNN's Jake Tapper ====
In November 2017, following the 2017 New York City truck attack wherein a terrorist shouted "Allahu Akbar", Fox News distorted a statement by Jake Tapper to make it appear as if Tapper had said "Allahu Akbar" can be used under the most "beautiful circumstances". Fox News omitted that Tapper had said the use of "Allahu Akbar" in the terrorist attack was not one of these beautiful circumstances. A headline on FoxNews.com was preceded by a tag reading "OUTRAGEOUS". The Fox News Twitter account distorted the statement further, saying "Jake Tapper Says 'Allahu Akbar' Is 'Beautiful' Right After NYC Terror Attack" in a tweet that was later deleted. Tapper chastised Fox News for choosing to "deliberately lie" and said "there was a time when one could tell the difference between Fox and the nutjobs at Infowars. It's getting tougher and tougher. Lies are lies." In 2009, Tapper had come to the defense of Fox News while he was a White House correspondent for ABC News, after the Obama administration claimed that the network was not a legitimate news organization.

Fox News guest host Jason Chaffetz apologized to Tapper for misrepresenting his statement. After Fox News had deleted the tweet, Sean Hannity repeated the misrepresentation and called Tapper "liberal fake news CNN's fake Jake Tapper" and mocked his ratings.

==== The New York Times ====
In July 2017, a report by Fox & Friends falsely said The New York Times had disclosed intelligence in one of its stories and that this intelligence disclosure helped Abu Bakr al-Baghdadi, the leader of the Islamic State, to evade capture. The report cited an inaccurate assertion by Gen. Tony Thomas, the head of the United States Special Operations Command, that a major newspaper had disclosed the intelligence. Fox News said it was The New York Times, repeatedly running the chyron "NYT Foils U.S. Attempt To Take Out Al-Bahgdadi". Pete Hegseth, one of the show's hosts, criticized the "failing New York Times". President Donald Trump tweeted about the Fox & Friends report shortly after it first aired, saying "The Failing New York Times foiled U.S. attempt to kill the single most wanted terrorist, Al-Baghdadi. Their sick agenda over National Security." Fox News later updated the story, but without apologizing to The New York Times or responding directly to the inaccuracies.

In a Washington Post column, Erik Wemple said Chris Wallace had covered The New York Times story himself on Fox News Sunday, adding: "Here's another case of the differing standards between Fox News's opinion operation", which has given "a state-run vibe on all matters related to Trump", compared to Fox News's news operation, which has provided "mostly sane coverage".

=== Climate change ===
Fox News has often been described as a major platform for climate change denial. A 2011 study by Lauren Feldman and Anthony Leiserowitz found Fox News "takes a more dismissive tone toward climate change than CNN and MSNBC". A 2008 study found Fox News emphasized the scientific uncertainty of climate change more than CNN, was less likely to say climate change was real, and more likely to interview climate change skeptics. Leaked emails showed that in 2009 Bill Sammon, the Fox News Washington managing editor, instructed Fox News journalists to dispute the scientific consensus on climate change and "refrain from asserting that the planet has warmed (or cooled) in any given period without IMMEDIATELY pointing out that such theories are based upon data that critics have called into question."

According to climate scientist Michael E. Mann, Fox News "has constructed an alternative universe where the laws of physics no longer apply, where the greenhouse effect is a myth, and where climate change is a hoax, the product of a massive conspiracy among scientists, who somehow have gotten the polar bears, glaciers, sea levels, superstorms, and megadroughts to play along." According to James Lawrence Powell's 2011 study of the climate science denial movement, Fox News provides "the deniers with a platform to say whatever they like without fear of contradiction." Fox News employs Steve Milloy, a prominent climate change denier with close financial and organizational ties to oil companies, as a contributor. In his columns about climate change for FoxNews.com, Fox News has failed to disclose his substantial funding from oil companies.

In 2011, the hosts of Fox & Friends described climate change as "unproven science", a "disputed fact", and criticized the Department of Education for working together with the children's network Nickelodeon to teach children about climate change. In 2001, Sean Hannity described the scientific consensus on climate change as "phony science from the left". In 2004, he falsely alleged that "scientists still can't agree on whether the global warming is scientific fact or fiction". In 2010, Hannity said the so-called "Climategate" – the leaking of e-mails by climate scientist that climate change skeptics claimed demonstrated scientific misconduct but which all subsequent enquiries have found no evidence of misconduct or wrongdoing – a "scandal" that "exposed global warming as a myth cooked up by alarmists". Hannity frequently invites contrarian fringe scientists and critics of climate change to his shows. In 2019, a widely shared Fox News news report falsely claimed that new climate science research showed that the Earth might be heading to a new Ice Age; the author of the study that Fox News cited said that Fox News "utterly misrepresents our research" and the study did not in any way suggest that Earth was heading to an Ice Age. Fox News later corrected the story.

Shepard Smith drew attention for being one of few voices formerly on Fox News to forcefully state that climate change is real, that human activities are a primary contributor to it and that there is a scientific consensus on the issue. His acceptance of the scientific consensus on climate change drew criticism from Fox News viewers and conservatives. Smith left Fox News in October 2019. In a 2021 interview with Christiane Amanpour on her eponymous show on CNN, he stated that his presence on Fox had become "untenable" due to the "falsehoods" and "lies" intentionally spread on the network's opinion shows.

=== Murder of Seth Rich conspiracy ===
On May 16, 2017, a day when other news organizations were extensively covering Donald Trump's revelation of classified information to Russia, Fox News ran a lead story about a private investigator's uncorroborated claims about the murder of Seth Rich, a DNC staffer. The private investigator said he had uncovered evidence that Rich was in contact with WikiLeaks and law enforcement were covering it up. The killing of Rich has given rise to conspiracy theories in right-wing circles that Hillary Clinton and the Democratic Party had Seth Rich killed allegedly because he was the source of the DNC leaks. U.S. intelligence agencies determined Russia was the source of the leaks. In reporting the investigator's claims, the Fox News report reignited right-wing conspiracy theories about the killing.

The Fox News story fell apart within hours. Other news organizations quickly revealed the investigator was a Donald Trump supporter and had according to NBC News "developed a reputation for making outlandish claims, such as one appearance on Fox News in 2007 in which he warned that underground networks of pink pistol-toting lesbian gangs were raping young women." The family of Seth Rich, the Washington D.C. police department, the Washington D.C. mayor's office, the FBI, and law enforcement sources familiar with the case rebuked the investigator's claims. Rich's relatives said: "We are a family who is committed to facts, not fake evidence that surfaces every few months to fill the void and distract law enforcement and the general public from finding Seth's murderers." The spokesperson for the family criticized Fox News for its reporting, alleging the outlet was motivated by a desire to deflect attention from the Trump-Russia story: "I think there's a very special place in hell for people that would use the memory of a murder victim in order to pursue a political agenda." The family has called for retractions and apologies from Fox News for the inaccurate reporting. Over the course of the day, Fox News altered the contents of the story and the headline, but did not issue corrections. When CNN contacted the private investigator later that day, the investigator said he had no evidence that Rich had contacted WikiLeaks. The investigator claimed he only learned about the possible existence of the evidence from a Fox News reporter. Fox News did not respond to inquiries by CNN, and the Washington Post. Fox News later on May 23, seven days after the story was published, retracted its original report, saying the original report did not meet its standards.

Nicole Hemmer, then assistant professor at the Miller Center of Public Affairs, wrote that the promotion of the conspiracy theory demonstrated how Fox News was "remaking itself in the image of fringe media in the age of Trump, blurring the lines between real and fake news." Max Boot of the Council on Foreign Relations said while intent behind Fox News, as a counterweight to the liberal media was laudable, the culmination of those efforts have been to create an alternative news source that promotes hoaxes and myths, of which the promotion of the Seth Rich conspiracy is an example. Fox News was also criticized by conservative outlets, such as The Weekly Standard, National Review, and conservative columnists, such as Jennifer Rubin, Michael Gerson, and John Podhoretz.

Rich's parents, Joel and Mary Rich, sued Fox News for the emotional distress it had caused them by its false reporting. In 2020, Fox News settled with Rich family, making a payment that was not officially disclosed but which was reported to be in the seven figures. Although the settlement had been agreed to earlier in the year, Fox News arranged to delay the public announcement until after the 2020 presidential election.

=== Unite the Right rally in Charlottesville ===
Fox News hosts and contributors defended Trump's remarks that "many sides" were to blame for violence at a gathering of hundreds of white nationalists in Charlottesville, Virginia. Some criticized Trump. In a press conference on August 15, Trump used the term "alt-left" to describe counterprotesters at the white supremacist rally, a term which had been used in Fox News's coverage of the white supremacist rally. Several of Trump's comments at the press conference mirrored those appearing earlier on Fox News.

According to Dylan Byers of CNN, Fox News's coverage on the day of the press conference "was heavy with "whataboutism". The average Fox viewer was likely left with the impression that the media's criticism of Trump and leftist protestors' toppling of some Confederate statues were far greater threats to America than white supremacism or the president's apparent defense of bigotry." Byers wrote "it showed that if Fox News has a line when it comes to Trump's presidency, it was not crossed on Tuesday."

=== Glenn Beck's comments about George Soros ===
During Glenn Beck's tenure at Fox News, he became one of the most high-profile proponents of conspiracy theories about George Soros, a Jewish Hungarian-American businessman and philanthropist known for his donations to American liberal political causes. Beck regularly described Soros as a "puppet-master" and used common anti-Semitic tropes to describe Soros and his activities. In a 2010 three-part series, Beck depicted George Soros as a cartoonish villain trying to "form a shadow government, using humanitarian aid as a cover", and that Soros wanted a one-world government. Beck promoted the false and anti-Semitic conspiracy theory that Soros was a Nazi collaborator as a 14-year-old in Nazi-occupied Hungary. Beck also characterized Soros's mother as a "wildly anti-Semitic" Nazi collaborator. According to The Washington Post: "Beck's series was largely considered obscene and delusional, if not outright anti-Semitic", but Beck's conspiracy theory became common on the right wing of American politics. Amid criticism of Beck's false smears, Fox News defended Beck, stating "information regarding Mr. Soros's experiences growing up were taken directly from his writings and from interviews given by him to the media, and no negative opinion was offered as to his actions as a child." Roger Ailes, then-head of Fox News, dismissed criticism levied at Beck by hundreds of rabbis, saying that they were "left-wing rabbis who basically don't think that anybody can ever use the word, Holocaust, on the air."

=== COVID-19 pandemic ===
During the first few weeks of the COVID-19 pandemic in the United States, Fox News was considerably more likely than other mainstream news outlets to promote misinformation about COVID-19. The network promoted the narrative that the emergency response to the pandemic was politically motivated or otherwise unwarranted, with Sean Hannity explicitly calling it a "hoax" (he later denied doing so) and other hosts downplaying it. This coverage was consistent with the messaging of Trump at the time. Only in mid March did the network change the tone of its coverage, after President Trump declared a national emergency. At the same time that Fox News commentators downplayed the threat of the virus in public, Fox's management and the Murdoch family took a broad range of internal measures to protect themselves and their employees against it.

Sean Hannity and Laura Ingraham, two of Fox News's primetime hosts, promoted use of the drug hydroxychloroquine for the treatment of COVID-19, an off-label usage which at the time was supported only by anecdotal evidence, after it was touted by Trump as a possible cure. Fox News promoted a conspiracy theory that coronavirus death toll numbers were inflated with people who would have died anyway from preexisting conditions. This was disputed by White House coronavirus task force members Anthony Fauci and Deborah Birx, with Fauci describing conspiracy theories as "nothing but distractions" during public health crises. Later in the pandemic, Hannity, Ingraham and Carlson promoted the use of livestock dewormer ivermectin as a possible COVID-19 treatment.

Studies have linked trust in Fox News, as well as viewership of Fox News, with fewer preventive behaviors and more risky behaviors related to COVID-19.

Once a COVID-19 vaccine became widely available, Fox News consistently questioned the efficacy and safety of the vaccine, celebrated evidence-free skepticism, and blasted attempts to promote vaccinations. More than 90% of Fox Corporation's full-time employees had been fully vaccinated by September 2021.

=== 2020 election fraud allegations and lawsuits by Dominion and Smartmatic ===
After Trump's defeat in the 2020 presidential election, Fox News host Jeanine Pirro promoted baseless allegations on her program that voting machine company Smartmatic and its competitor Dominion Voting Systems had conspired to rig the election against Trump. Hosts Lou Dobbs and Maria Bartiromo also promoted the allegations on their programs on sister network Fox Business. In December 2020, Smartmatic sent a letter to Fox News demanding retractions and threatening legal action, specifying that retractions "must be published on multiple occasions" so as to "match the attention and audience targeted with the original defamatory publications." Days later, each of the three programs aired the same three-minute video segment consisting of an interview with an election technology expert who refuted the allegations promoted by the hosts, responding to questions from an unseen and unidentified man. None of the three hosts personally issued retractions. Smartmatic filed a $2.7 billion defamation suit against the network, the three hosts, Powell and Trump attorney Rudy Giuliani in February 2021. In an April 2021 court brief seeking dismissal of the suit, Fox attorney Paul Clement argued that the network was simply "reporting allegations made by a sitting President and his lawyers." A New York State Supreme Court judge ruled in March 2022 that the suit could proceed, though he dismissed allegations against Sidney Powell and Pirro, and some claims against Giuliani. The judge allowed allegations against Bartiromo and Dobbs to stand. The New York Supreme Court, Appellate Division unanimously rejected a Fox News bid to dismiss the Smartmatic suit in February 2023. The court reinstated defamation allegations against Giuliani and Pirro.

In December 2020, Dominion Voting Systems sent a similar letter demanding retractions to Trump attorney Sidney Powell, who had promoted the allegations on Fox programs. On March 26, 2021, Dominion filed a $1.6 billion defamation lawsuit against Fox News, alleging that Fox and some of its pundits spread conspiracy theories about Dominion, and allowed guests to make false statements about the company. On May 18, 2021, Fox News filed a motion to dismiss the Dominion Voting Systems lawsuit, asserting a First Amendment right "to inform the public about newsworthy allegations of paramount public concern." The motion to dismiss was denied on December 16, 2021, by a Delaware Superior Court judge. In addition to Bartiromo, Dobbs, and Pirro, the suit also names primetime hosts Tucker Carlson and Sean Hannity. Venezuelan businessman Majed Khalil sued Fox, Dobbs and Powell for $250 million in December 2021, alleging they had falsely implicated him in rigging Dominion and Smartmatic machines. Dobbs and Fox News reached a confidential settlement with Khalil in April 2023.

Fox News was the only major network or cable news outlet to not carry the first televised prime time hearing of the January 6 committee live; its regular programming of Tucker Carlson Tonight and Hannity was aired without commercial breaks. During the weeks following the election, Carlson and Hannity often amplified Trump's election falsehoods on their programs; previously disclosed text messages between Hannity and White House press secretary Kayleigh McEnany were presented during the hearing. Hannity told his audience, "Unlike this committee and their cheerleaders in the media mob, we will actually be telling you the truth," while Carlson said, "This is the only hour on an American news channel that won't be covering their propaganda live. They are lying and we are not going to help them do it."

In June 2022, a Delaware Superior Court judge again declined to dismiss the Dominion suit against Fox News, and also allowed Dominion to sue the network's corporate parent, Fox Corporation. The judge ruled that Rupert and Lachlan Murdoch may have acted with actual malice because there was a reasonable inference they "either knew Dominion had not manipulated the election or at least recklessly disregarded the truth when they allegedly caused Fox News to propagate its claims about Dominion." He noted a report that Rupert Murdoch spoke with Trump a few days after the election and informed him that he had lost.

The New York Times reported in December 2022 that Dominion had acquired communications between Fox News executives and hosts, and between a Fox Corporation employee and the Trump White House, showing they knew that what the network was reporting was untrue. Dominion attorneys said hosts Sean Hannity and Tucker Carlson, and Fox executives, attested to this in sworn depositions. In November 2020, Hannity hosted Sidney Powell, who asserted Dominion machines had been rigged, but said in his deposition, "I did not believe it for one second." A February 2023 Dominion court filing showed Fox News primetime hosts messaging each other to insult and mock Trump advisers, indicating the hosts knew the allegations made by Powell and Giuliani were false. Rupert Murdoch messaged that Trump's voter fraud claims were "really crazy stuff," telling Fox News CEO Suzanne Scott that it was "terrible stuff damaging everybody, I fear." As a January 2021 Georgia runoff election approached that would determine party control of the U.S. Senate, Murdoch told Scott, "Trump will concede eventually and we should concentrate on Georgia, helping any way we can."

After the 2016 election, the network developed a cutting-edge system to call elections, which proved very successful during the 2018 midterm elections. The network was the first to call the 2020 Arizona race for Biden, angering many viewers. Washington managing editor Bill Sammon supervised the network's Decision Desk that made the call. Bret Baier and Martha MacCallum, the network's main news anchors, suggested during a high-level conference call that relying solely on data to make the call was inadequate and that viewer reaction should also be considered; MacCallum said, "in a Trump environment, the game is just very, very different." Sammon stood by the 2020 call and was fired by the network after the January 2021 Georgia runoff.

In 2023, Rupert Murdoch was deposed and testified that some Fox News commentators were endorsing election fraud claims they knew were false.

In February 2023, Fox's internal communications were released, showing that its presenters and senior executives privately doubted Donald Trump's claims of a stolen election. Chairman Rupert Murdoch once described Trump's voter fraud claims as "really crazy stuff", and also said that Trump advisers Rudy Giuliani and Sidney Powell's television appearances were "terrible stuff damaging everybody". One November 2020 exchange showed Tucker Carlson accusing Powell of "lying ... I caught her. It's insane", with Laura Ingraham responding that "Sidney is a complete nut. No one will work with her. Ditto with Rudy". In another exchange that month, Carlson called for Fox journalist Jacqui Heinrich to be "fired" because she fact-checked Trump and said that there was no evidence of voter fraud from Dominion. Carlson said that Heinrich's actions "needs to stop immediately, like tonight. It's measurably hurting the company. The stock price is down", while Heinrich deleted the fact-check the next morning.

In March 2023, more of Fox's internal communications were released. One November 2020 communication showed Fox CEO Suzanne Scott criticizing fact-checking, stating that she cannot "keep defending these reporters who don't understand our viewers and how to handle stories ... The audience feels like we crapped on" them, and Fox was losing their audience's "trust and belief" in them. Another December 2020 communication showed Scott responding to Fox presenter Eric Shawn's fact-checking of Donald Trump's false 2020 election claims by demanding that the fact-checking "has to stop now ... This is bad business ... The audience is furious."

On March 31, 2023, Delaware Superior Court judge Eric Davis ruled in a summary judgment that it "is CRYSTAL clear that none of the statements relating to Dominion about the 2020 election are true" and ordered for the case to go to trial.

On April 18, 2023, Fox News reached a settlement with Dominion just before the trial started, concluding the lawsuit; Fox agreed to pay Dominion $787.5 million, and further stated: "We acknowledge the Court's rulings finding certain claims about Dominion to be false".

=== Compulsory reductions in meat consumption ===
In April 2021, at least five Fox News and Fox Business personalities amplified a story published by the Daily Mail, a British tabloid, that incorrectly linked a university study to President Joe Biden's climate change agenda, to falsely assert that Americans would be compelled to dramatically reduce their meat consumption to mitigate greenhouse gas emissions caused by flatulence. Fox News aired a graphic detailing the supposed compulsory reductions, falsely indicating the information came from the Agriculture Department, which numerous Republican politicians and commentators tweeted. Fox News anchor John Roberts reported to "say goodbye to your burgers if you want to sign up to the Biden climate agenda." Days later, Roberts acknowledged on air that the story was false.

=== Report that Biden administration was continuing to build the Mexico–United States border wall ===
According to analysis by Media Matters, on May 12, 2021, Fox News reported on its website: "Biden resumes border wall construction after promising to halt it". Correspondent Bill Melugin then appeared on Special Report with Bret Baier to report "the U.S. Army Corps of Engineers is actually going to be restarting border wall construction down in the Rio Grande Valley" after "a lot of blowback and pressure from local residents and local politicians." After the Corps of Engineers tweeted a clarification, Melugin deleted a tweet about the story and tweeted an "update" clarifying that a levee wall was being constructed to mitigate damage to flood control systems caused by uncompleted wall construction, and the website story headline was changed to "Biden administration to resume border wall levee construction as crisis worsens." Later on Fox News Primetime, host Brian Kilmeade briefly noted the levee but commented to former Trump advisor Stephen Miller: "They're going to restart building the wall again, Stephen." Fox News host Sean Hannity later broadcast the original Melugin story without any mention of the levee.

=== Crime reporting ===
Media Matters reported in September 2024 that during the Biden presidency Fox News had promoted a false "crime crisis" narrative, particularly directed toward undocumented migrants, which reflected Donald Trump's political rhetoric. The Fox News narrative consisted of reported violent crime anecdotes rather than FBI crime rate statistics showing violent crime had declined significantly since 2020. One Fox host, Ainsley Earhardt, said that even if the FBI data were right, "we're all a little bit more scared than we used to be." Later that month, weeks before the 2024 presidential election, the FBI released crime data for 2023 showing that violent crime had declined 3% from 2022. The report was widely covered by mainstream news outlets that day, though the Fox News coverage was limited to a 28-second segment by evening anchor Bret Baier. He reported "critics say the report is not accurate because it does not include big cities," echoing a false assertion made by Elon Musk and other Trump supporters on social media.

== Controversies ==
=== Sexual harassment ===
The network has been accused of permitting sexual harassment and racial discrimination by on-air hosts, executives, and employees, paying out millions of dollars in legal settlements. Prominent Fox News figures such as Roger Ailes, Bill O'Reilly and Eric Bolling were fired after many women accused them of sexual harassment. At least four lawsuits alleged Fox News co-president Bill Shine ignored, enabled or concealed Roger Ailes's alleged sexual harassment. Fox News CEO Rupert Murdoch has dismissed the high-profile sexual misconduct allegations as "largely political" and speculated they were made "because we are conservative".

Bill O'Reilly and Fox News settled six agreements, totaling $45 million, with women who accused O'Reilly of sexual harassment. In January 2017, shortly after Bill O'Reilly settled a sexual harassment lawsuit for $32 million ("an extraordinarily large amount for such cases"), Fox News renewed Bill O'Reilly's contract. Fox News's parent company, 21st Century Fox, said it was aware of the lawsuit. The contract between O'Reilly and Fox News read he could not be fired from the network unless sexual harassment allegations were proven in court.

Fox News's extensive coverage of the Harvey Weinstein scandal in October 2017 was seen by some as hypocritical. Fox News dedicated at least 12 hours of coverage to the Weinstein scandal, yet only dedicated 20 minutes to Bill O'Reilly, who just like Weinstein had been accused of sexual harassment by a multitude of women. A few weeks later, when a number of females under the age of 18, including a 14-year-old, accused Alabama Senate candidate Roy Moore of making sexual advances, Hannity dismissed the sexual misconduct allegations and dedicated coverage on his television show to casting doubt on the accusers. Other prime-time Fox News hosts Tucker Carlson and Laura Ingraham queried The Washington Post's reporting or opted to bring up sexual misconduct allegations regarding show business figures such as Harvey Weinstein and Louis C.K. Fox News figures Jeanine Pirro and Gregg Jarrett questioned both the validity of The Washington Post's reporting and that of the women. In December 2017, a few days before the Alabama Senate election, Fox News, along with the conspiracy websites Breitbart News and The Gateway Pundit, ran an inaccurate headline which claimed one of Roy Moore's accusers admitted to forging an inscription by Roy Moore in her yearbook; Fox News later added a correction to the story.

A number of Fox News hosts have welcomed Bill O'Reilly to their shows and paid tributes to Roger Ailes after his death. In May 2017, Hannity called Ailes "a second father" and said to Ailes's "enemies" that he was "preparing to kick your a** in the next life". Ailes had the year before been fired from Fox News after women alleged he sexually harassed them. In September 2017, several months after Bill O'Reilly was fired from Fox News in the wake of women alleging he sexually harassed them, Hannity hosted O'Reilly on his show. Some Fox News employees criticized the decision. According to CNN, during the interview, Hannity found kinship with O'Reilly as he appeared "to feel that he and O'Reilly have both become victims of liberals looking to silence them."

=== Obama administration conflict ===
In September 2009, the Obama administration engaged in a verbal conflict with Fox News Channel. On September 20, President Barack Obama appeared on all major news programs except Fox News, a snub partially in response to remarks about him by commentators Glenn Beck and Sean Hannity and Fox coverage of Obama's health-care proposal.

In late September 2009, Obama's senior advisor David Axelrod and Roger Ailes met in secret to attempt to smooth out tensions between the two camps. Two weeks later, White House chief of staff Rahm Emanuel referred to FNC as "not a news network" and communications director Anita Dunn said "Fox News often operates as either the research arm or the communications arm of the Republican Party". Obama commented: "If media is operating basically as a talk radio format, then that's one thing, and if it's operating as a news outlet, then that's another." Emanuel said it was important "to not have the CNNs and the others in the world basically be led in following Fox".

Within days, it was reported that Fox had been excluded from an interview with administration official Ken Feinberg, with bureau chiefs from the White House press pool (ABC, CBS, NBC, and CNN) coming to Fox's defense. A bureau chief said: "If any member had been excluded it would have been the same thing, it has nothing to do with Fox or the White House or the substance of the issues." Shortly after the story broke, the White House admitted to a low-level mistake, saying Fox had not made a specific request to interview Feinberg. Fox White House correspondent Major Garrett said he had not made a specific request, but had a "standing request from me as senior White House correspondent on Fox to interview any newsmaker at the Treasury at any given time news is being made".

On November 8, 2009, the Los Angeles Times reported an unnamed Democratic consultant was warned by the White House not to appear on Fox News again. According to the article, Dunn claimed in an e-mail to have checked with colleagues who "deal with TV issues" who denied telling anyone to avoid Fox. Patrick Caddell, a Fox News contributor and former pollster for President Jimmy Carter, said he had spoken with other Democratic consultants who had received similar warnings from the White House.

On October 2, 2013, Fox News host Anna Kooiman cited on the air a fake story from the National Report parody site, which claimed Obama had offered to keep the International Museum of Muslim Cultures open with cash from his own pocket.

=== Journalistic ethical standards ===
Fox News attracted controversy in April 2018 when it was revealed primetime host Sean Hannity had defended Trump's then personal attorney Michael Cohen on air without disclosing Cohen was his lawyer. On April 9, 2018, federal agents from the U.S. Attorney's office served a search warrant on Cohen's office and residence. On the air, Hannity defended Cohen and criticized the federal action, calling it "highly questionable" and "an unprecedented abuse of power". On April 16, 2018, in a court hearing, Cohen's lawyers told the judge that Cohen had ten clients in 2017–2018 but did "traditional legal tasks" for only three, including Trump. The federal judge ordered the revelation of the third client, whom Cohen's lawyers named as Hannity.

Hannity was not sanctioned by Fox News for this breach of journalistic ethics, with Fox News releasing a statement that the channel was unaware of Hannity's relationship to Cohen and that it had "spoken to Sean and he continues to have our full support." Media ethics experts said that Hannity's disclosure failure was a major breach of journalistic ethics and that the network should have suspended or fired him for it.

=== NYC Human Rights Law violations ===
In mid-2021, Fox News agreed to pay a $1 million settlement to New York City after its Commission on Human Rights cited "a pattern of violating the NYC Human Rights Law". A Fox News spokesperson claimed that "FOX News Media has already been in full compliance across the board, but [settled] to continue enacting extensive preventive measures against all forms of discrimination and harassment."

== International transmission ==
Countries where Fox News is provided

The Fox News Channel feed has international availability via multiple providers, while Fox Extra segments provide alternate programming. Fox News is carried in more than 40 countries.

=== Australia ===
In Australia, FNC is broadcast on the dominant pay television provider Foxtel.

=== Brazil ===
FNC reached Brazil through Sky Brasil on November 1, 2002, after being introduced at ABTA 2002. Commercials on FNC are replaced with Fox Extra. It is available on Vivo TV.

=== Canada ===
Fox had initially planned to launch a joint venture with Canwest's Global Television Network, tentatively named Fox News Canada, which would have featured a mixture of U.S. and Canadian news programming. As a result, the CRTC denied a 2003 application requesting permission for Fox News Channel to be carried in Canada. However, in March 2004, a Fox executive said the venture had been shelved; in November of that year, the CRTC added Fox News to its whitelist of foreign channels that may be carried by television providers.

In May 2023, the CRTC announced that it would open a public consultation regarding the channel's carriage in Canada, acting upon complaints by the LGBT advocacy group Egale Canada surrounding an episode of Tucker Carlson Tonight that contained content described as "malicious misinformation" regarding trans, non-binary, gender non-conforming, and two-spirit communities, including "the inflammatory and false claim that trans people are 'targeting' Christians."

=== India ===
It is available through streaming service Disney+ Hotstar.

=== Indonesia ===
In Indonesia, it is available on Channel 397 on pay-TV provider First Media.

=== Ireland ===
See: United Kingdom & Ireland.

=== Israel ===
In Israel, FNC is broadcast on Channel 105 of the satellite provider Yes, as well as being carried on Cellcom TV and Partner TV. It is also broadcast on channel 200 on cable operator HOT.

=== Italy ===
In Italy, FNC is broadcast on Sky Italia. Fox News was launched on Stream TV in 2001, and moved to Sky Italia in 2003.

=== Japan ===
Although service to Japan ceased in summer 2003, it can still be seen on Americable (distributor for American bases), Mediatti (Kadena Air Base) and Pan Global TV Japan.

=== Mexico ===
The channel's international feed is being carried by cable provider Izzi Telecom.

=== Netherlands ===
In the Netherlands, Fox News has been carried by cable providers UPC Nederland and CASEMA, and satellite provider Canaldigitaal; all have dropped the channel in recent years. At this time, only cable provider Caiway (available in a limited number of towns in the central part of the country) is broadcasting the channel. The channel was also carried by IPTV provider KNIPPR (owned by T-Mobile).

=== New Zealand ===
In New Zealand, FNC is broadcast on Channel 088 of pay satellite operator SKY Network Television's digital platform. It was formerly broadcast overnight on free-to-air UHF New Zealand TV channel Prime; this was discontinued in January 2010, reportedly due to an expiring broadcasting license.

=== Pakistan ===
In Pakistan, Fox News Channel is available on PTCL Smart TV and a number of cable and IPTV operators.

=== Philippines ===
In the Philippines, Fox News Channel is available on Sky Cable, Cablelink and G Sat Channel 50. It was available on Cignal until January 1, 2021, due to contract expiration; however, the channel returned on June 16, 2022.

=== Portugal ===
In Portugal, Fox News was available on Meo. The channel is however no longer available on the operator and it is not carried by other Portuguese TV operators.

=== Scandinavia ===
Between 2003 and 2006, in Sweden and the other Scandinavian countries, FNC was broadcast 16 hours a day on TV8 (with Fox News Extra segments replacing U.S. advertising). Fox News was dropped by TV8 in September 2006.

=== Singapore ===
In Singapore, FNC is broadcast on pay-TV operator StarHub TV, as well on Singtel TV.

=== South Africa ===
In South Africa, FNC is broadcast on StarSat. The most popular pay television operator, DStv, does not offer FNC in its channel bouquet.

=== Spain ===
In Spain, Fox News was available on Movistar Plus+. The channel was part of the operator since its first incarnation as Canal Satellite Digital in the early 2000s, but was later removed from the operator's satellite offer by March 2023, and ceased transmission to the remaining offers on July 9, 2024. The channel is not carried by other Spanish TV operators.

=== United Kingdom and Ireland ===
FNC was carried in the United Kingdom by Sky. On August 29, 2017, Sky dropped Fox News; the broadcaster said its carriage was not "commercially viable" due to average viewership of fewer than 2,000 viewers per day. The company said the decision was unrelated to 21st Century Fox's proposed acquisition of the remainder of Sky plc (which ultimately led to a bidding war that resulted in its acquisition by Comcast instead).

The potential co-ownership had prompted concerns from critics of the deal, who felt Sky News could similarly undergo a shift to an opinionated format with a right-wing viewpoint. However, such a move would violate Ofcom broadcast codes, which requires all news programming to show due impartiality. The channel's broadcasts in the country have violated this rule on several occasions.

== Notable personalities ==
=== Program hosts ===
- Bret Baier
- Shannon Bream
- Will Cain
- Rachel Campos-Duffy
- Emily Compagno
- Peter Doocy
- Steve Doocy
- Ainsley Earhardt
- Harris Faulkner
- Harold Ford Jr.
- Trace Gallagher
- Paul Gigot
- Trey Gowdy
- Greg Gutfeld
- Sean Hannity
- Aishah Hasnie
- Jacqui Heinrich
- Bill Hemmer
- Charles Hurt
- Laura Ingraham
- Griff Jenkins
- Lawrence B. Jones
- Brian Kilmeade
- Howard Kurtz
- Tomi Lahren
- Mark Levin
- Martha MacCallum
- Kayleigh McEnany
- Arthel Neville
- Dana Perino
- John Roberts
- Jon Scott
- Eric Shawn
- Sandra Smith
- Jessica Tarlov
- Lara Trump
- Stuart Varney
- Jesse Watters

=== Correspondents and substitute anchors ===
- Manny Alvarez
- Julie Banderas
- Christine Clayburg
- Kevin Corke
- Claudia Cowan
- Rich Edson
- Mike Emanuel
- Anna Gilligan
- Lauren Green
- Jennifer Griffin
- Benjamin Hall
- Steve Harrigan
- Molly Henneberg
- Brit Hume
- Phil Keating
- Kennedy
- Molly Line
- Bryan Llenas
- Dagen McDowell
- Hollie McKay
- Kate Obenshain
- Charles Payne
- Carley Shimkus
- Trey Yingst

=== Regular guests and contributors ===
- Keith Ablow
- Charly Arnolt
- Raymond Arroyo
- David Asman
- Mike Baker
- William Bennett
- Guy Benson
- Jason Chaffetz
- Matthew Continetti
- Kellyanne Conway
- Brett Cooper
- Alan Dershowitz
- Miranda Devine
- Ben Domenech
- Larry Elder
- Mo Elleithee
- Ezekiel Emanuel
- Nigel Farage
- Ari Fleischer
- Steve Forbes
- Charlie Gasparino
- Newt Gingrich
- Bernard Goldberg
- Victor Davis Hanson
- Marie Harf
- Mollie Hemingway
- Hugh Hewitt
- Steve Hilton
- Philip A. Holloway
- Mike Huckabee
- Santita Jackson
- Gregg Jarrett
- Robert Jeffress
- Jack Keane
- Keith Kellogg
- Dennis Kucinich
- John Layfield
- Karoline Leavitt
- Rich Lowry
- Frank Luntz
- Leslie Marshall
- Andrew C. McCarthy
- William McGurn
- Dennis Miller
- Judith Miller
- Stephen Moore
- Jonathan Morris
- Deroy Murdock
- Douglas Murray
- Janette Nesheiwat, MD
- Oliver North
- Kevin O'Leary
- Burgess Owens
- Charles Payne
- Mark Penn
- Drew Pinsky
- Jason L. Riley
- Karl Rove
- Nicole Saphier
- Mercedes Schlapp
- Douglas Schoen
- Ben Shapiro
- Tom Shillue
- Marc Siegel
- Ben Stein
- Kimberley Strassel
- Leo Terrell
- Marc Thiessen
- Katherine Timpf
- Clay Travis
- Joe Trippi
- Jonathan Turley
- Tyrus
- Brett Velicovich
- Jason Whitlock
- Lis Wiehl
- Juan Williams
- Chad Wolf
- Robert Wolf
- John Yoo
- Byron York

=== Former hosts and contributors ===
- Jim Angle (deceased)
- Louis Aguirre (former morning host, now at WPLG in Miami)
- Jennifer Ashton (now at ABC News)
- Rudi Bakhtiar (now PR Director for the Public Affairs Alliance of Iranian Americans)
- Ellison Barber (now with NBC News)
- Tiki Barber (now with CBS Sports Network)
- Fred Barnes
- Maria Bartiromo
- Glenn Beck (former afternoon host; now on TheBlaze)
- Bob Beckel (terminated amid racist remarks, deceased)
- Lisa Bernhard (entertainment correspondent)
- Jedediah Bila
- Tony Blankley (deceased)
- Dan Bongino
- Eric Bolling (terminated amid sexual harassment allegations)
- John R. Bolton (left to become U.S. National Security Advisor)
- Donna Brazile (now at ABC News)
- Dave Briggs (now at CNN)
- Patti Ann Browne
- Scott Brown
- Tammy Bruce
- Eric Burns (not renewed)
- Brenda Buttner (deceased)
- Patrick Caddell (deceased)
- Joseph A. Cafasso (stepped down over allegations he overrepresented his military record)
- Herman Cain (deceased)
- Carl Cameron (retired in August 2017)
- Alisyn Camerota (now at CNN)
- Gretchen Carlson
- Tucker Carlson
- Ben Carson (joined Trump cabinet)
- Neil Cavuto
- Steve Centanni (retired in August 2014)
- Heather Childers (terminated)
- Liz Cheney (now in public service)
- Kiran Chetry (later worked for CNN)
- Wesley Clark (now at CNN)
- Alan Colmes (deceased)
- Rita Cosby (later worked at MSNBC)
- Catherine Crier (now at TruTV)
- Monica Crowley
- S. E. Cupp (now at CNN)
- Stacey Dash (not renewed)
- Janice Dean
- Lou Dobbs (deceased)
- Jill Dobson
- Laurie Dhue (not renewed)
- Matt Drudge
- Darby Dunn (now at CNBC)
- Erick Erickson (now at WSB Radio in Atlanta)
- Donna Fiducia (no longer active in cable news industry, went into Georgia real estate)
- Kristin Fisher (now at CNN)
- Rick Folbaum (now at WANF)
- Melissa Francis (not renewed)
- Courtney Friel (now at KTLA-TV)
- Neal Gabler
- Lea Gabrielle
- Major Garrett (now at CBS News)
- John Gibson
- Alexis Glick (left Fox Business in December 2009; now at CNN)
- Jonah Goldberg
- Wendell Goler (deceased)
- Kimberly Guilfoyle
- Jane Hall
- Mary Katharine Ham (now at CNN)
- Elisabeth Hasselbeck
- Stephen F. Hayes
- Pete Hegseth (now United States Secretary of Defense)
- Ed Henry (terminated amid sexual harassment allegations)
- Catherine Herridge (now at CBS News)
- E. D. Hill (now at CNN)
- Marc Lamont Hill (now at BET and CNN)
- Kit Hoover (now at TLC)
- Margaret Hoover (now at PBS and CNN)
- Page Hopkins (left network September 26, 2008)
- Adam Housley
- Juliet Huddy (now at WABC Radio)
- Abby Huntsman
- Laura Ingle (now at NewsNation)
- Carol Iovanna (now runs production company)
- Marvin Kalb (not renewed)
- John Kasich (later served two terms as Governor of Ohio from 2011 to 2019)
- Terry Keenan (deceased)
- Greg Kelly (now at Newsmax TV)
- Megyn Kelly (moved to NBC News; left NBC in January 2019)
- Charlie Kirk (deceased)
- Mort Kondracke
- Anna Kooiman (now at NewsNation)
- Charles Krauthammer (deceased)
- Bill Kristol
- Jenna Lee
- Rick Leventhal
- Harvey Levin
- Andy Levy (now at HLN)
- Dana Lewis (now at WSAW-TV in Wausau)
- G. Gordon Liddy (deceased)
- Lara Logan
- Michelle Malkin (now at Newsmax TV)
- Rachel Marsden (contributor and Red Eye panelist; now lives in France)
- Meghan McCain
- Bill McCuddy
- Doug McKelway
- Jillian Mele
- Zell Miller
- Maria Molina
- Clayton Morris
- Dick Morris (contributor, not renewed)
- Andrew Napolitano
- Heather Nauert (now Senior Fellow at the Hudson Institute)
- Scottie Nell Hughes (terminated)
- Reena Ninan (now at CNN, Good Trouble Productions & female bodybuilding)
- Joanne Nosuchinsky
- Robert Novak (deceased)
- Bill O'Reilly (terminated amid sexual harassment allegations)
- Barbara Olson (killed in the September 11 attacks in 2001)
- Morgan Ortagus (now U.S. State Department Spokesperson)
- Candace Owens
- Katie Pavlich (now with NewsNation)
- Lt. Col. Ralph Peters
- Uma Pemmaraju (deceased)
- Julian Phillips
- Jeanine Pirro (now the United States Attorney for the District of Columbia)
- Kirsten Powers (now at CNN)
- Elizabeth Prann (now at HLN)
- Judith Regan
- Rick Reichmuth
- Geraldo Rivera
- Julie Roginsky
- Ed Rollins (not renewed)
- James Rosen (now at the Sinclair Broadcast Group)
- Sarah Huckabee Sanders (contributor, terminated)
- Rick Santorum (now with CNN)
- Rob Schmitt (now at Newsmax TV)
- Mike Schneider (left for Bloomberg Television, most recently at NJTV)
- Laura Schwartz
- Bob Sellers (was morning co-anchor at WZTV in Nashville until 2016)
- Suzanne Sena
- David Shuster (now at i24NEWS)
- Jane Skinner
- Shepard Smith (left for CNBC)
- Tony Snow (became White House Press Secretary, deceased)
- Todd Starnes
- Chris Stirewalt (now at NewsNation)
- John Stossel
- Andrea Tantaros
- Cal Thomas (not renewed)
- Greta Van Susteren (left for MSNBC, now at Gray Television)
- Linda Vester
- Leland Vittert (now at NewsNation)
- Chris Wallace (now at CNN)
- George Will (now at NBC News and MSNBC)
- Brian Wilson (presently morning drive time host on WMAL-FM)
- Paula Zahn (left for CNN, now at Investigation Discovery)

== See also ==
- The Fox Effect
- Fox Music
- The Fox Nation
- Journalistic objectivity
- Mass media
- Media bias
- Media bias in the United States
- News media
- News media in the United States
- Radio Maria
- Television studio
