= Steve Harrigan =

American television news journalist

- Education: Duke University
- Occupation: Television news correspondent
- Known for: Fox News Middle East correspondent

Steve Harrigan is a television news correspondent who worked on foreign assignments for CNN News before joining Fox News as a Middle East correspondent in October 2001.

== Career ==
While working at CNN in Moscow "where he reported from inside the Kremlin when then Soviet President Mikhail Gorbachev resigned in 1991, and covered the Chechen War". CNN's Moscow bureau received the Peabody Award, Alfred I. duPont–Columbia University Award, and Overseas Press Club David Kaplan Award for excellence in reporting while he was with the network.

Harrigan reported from Georgia when it was involved in combat with Russia in 2008 and had to run to escape after being targeted by gunfire at one point. Harrigan reported from Haiti in 2010 after a major earthquake. He has also reported on Hurricane Harvey.

In 2010, Harrigan reported on Hurricane Earl and its aftermath on St. Thomas, Virgin Islands. He reported on Hurricane Katrina from Gulfport, Mississippi; Operation Enduring Freedom in Afghanistan; and conflicts between Israelis and Palestinians.

Harrigan has filed reports from 80 countries—more than any other Fox News correspondent.

== Libya controversy ==
On March 21, 2011 CNN foreign correspondent Nic Robertson criticized Harrigan's coverage of Operation Odyssey Dawn and allegations that the Libyan government had used foreign journalists as human shields against a coalition air-strike on Muammar Gaddafi's compound in Tripoli. The controversy arose when Harrigan refused to take part in a trip organized by the Libyan government to inspect the site of the attack. According to Robertson, the Fox News team sent a non-editorial member of their staff instead of Harrigan.

== Personal life ==
Harrigan graduated from Duke University and holds a Ph.D. in comparative literature. He is fluent in the Russian language.

He lives in Miami, Florida.
