= Janice Dean =

Canadian weather presenter

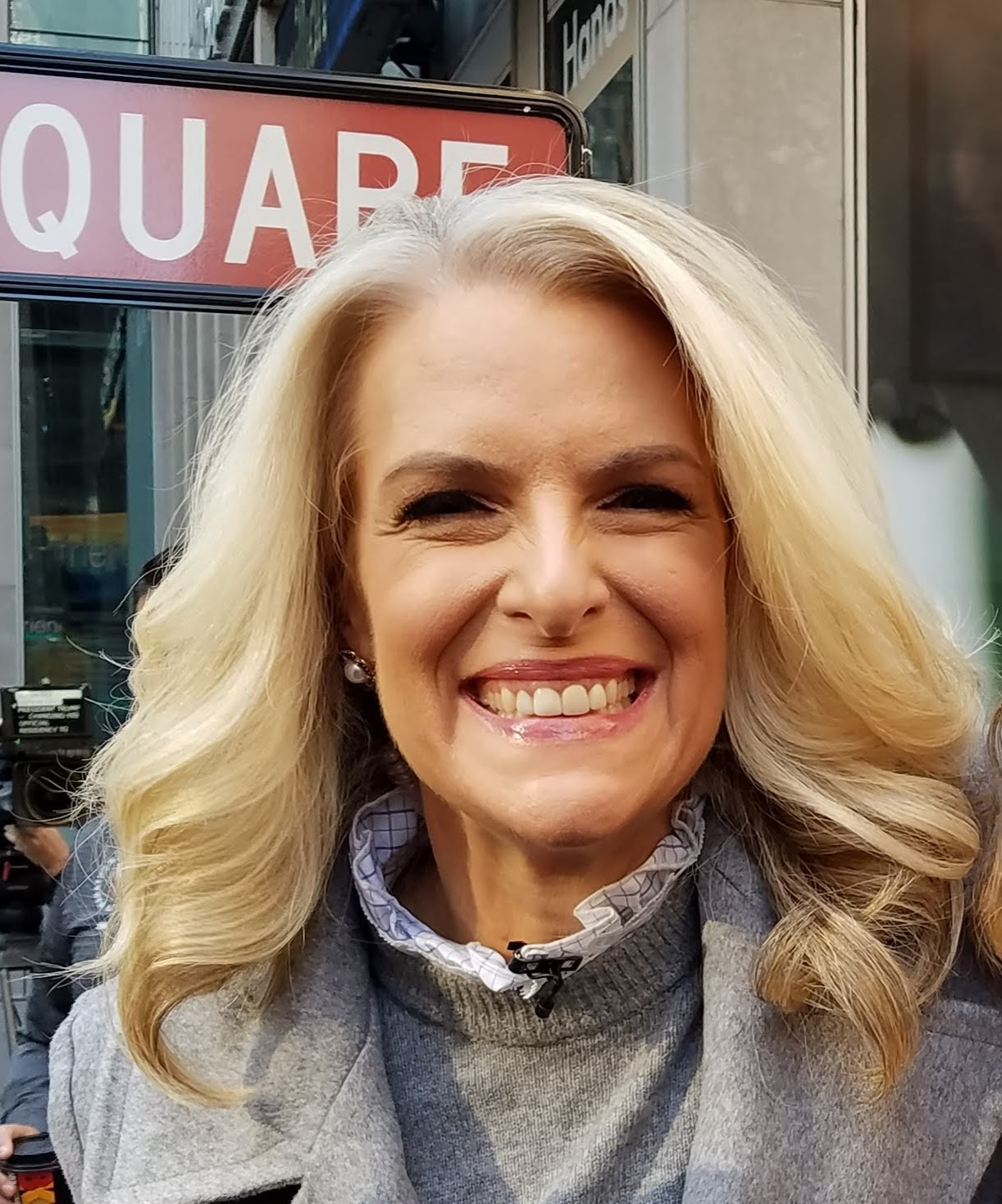
- Dean in 2019
- Born: May 9, 1970 (age 56); Toronto, Ontario, Canada
- Education: Algonquin College
- Occupations: Host and weather presenter for Fox News
- Political party: Republican
- Spouse: Sean Newman (m. 2007)
- Children: 2
- Website: www.foxnews.com/person/d/janice-dean

Janice Dean (born May 9, 1970) is a former Canadian-born American weather presenter, television show host, and author based in New York City. She retired from Fox News on July 12, 2026 due to health reasons. She had served as co-host and weather anchor on Fox & Friends.

== Career ==
Dean was born in Toronto, Ontario, grew up in Ottawa, and graduated from Algonquin College with a degree in radio-television broadcasting. Before starting her career in broadcasting, she worked as a Canadian bylaw enforcement officer. Later Dean worked at several radio and television stations in Canada and the United States, including CHEZ-FM and WCBS-TV, finally landing a post at Fox News.

In 2009, Dean's application for the American Meteorological Society Seal of Approval was granted. The Seal is not a meteorology diploma, so she is not a meteorologist. Rather, it was launched in 1957 as a way to recognize on-air personalities for their sound delivery of weather information to the general public, and the AMS is no longer accepting applications for the Seal of Approval Program.

Dean wrote a series of Freddy the Frogcaster children's books.

Her first book, Mostly Sunny: How I Learned to Keep Smiling Through the Rainiest Days, was released on March 5, 2019. Her second book, Make Your Own Sunshine: Inspiring Stories of People Who Find Light in Dark Times, was released on March 2, 2021.

On June 25, 2026, Dean announced she will be stepping away from her position at Fox News, due to the worsening effects of her multiple sclerosis.

=== Criticisms of Andrew Cuomo ===
Dean's father-in-law and mother-in-law, each a resident of an assisted living facility or nursing home in New York, died due to complications of COVID-19. In the aftermath, she attributed both deaths to a state advisory that required admissions and readmissions of assisted living and nursing home residents without virus testing and became an outspoken high-profile critic of Governor Andrew Cuomo and the lack of media coverage about the policy.

Dean criticized CNN, Good Morning America, and People Magazine; for doing "puff pieces" on Cuomo's actions relative to the pandemic that did not touch on the nursing home subject. She specifically noted the behavior of both Governor Cuomo and his brother Chris regarding his appearances on Chris's CNN show, describing it as "an insensitive, giggling interview."

The Governor's secretary Melissa DeRosa was among the Cuomo aides who, along with his brother, criticized Dean behind the scenes and tried to create a strategy to paint Dean's commentary as unimportant. It was reported that Chris Cuomo and Melissa DeRosa had plotted to discredit Dean over her criticism of Andrew Cuomo.

== Personal life ==
In 2007 she married Sean Newman of the New York City Fire Department. They have two sons, Matthew and Theodore.

She was diagnosed with multiple sclerosis in 2005.

== See also ==
- New Yorkers in journalism
