= Jillian Mele =

American news anchor and reporter (born 1982)

- Born: September 17, 1982 (age 43); Pennsylvania, U.S.
- Education: La Salle University (B.A.)
- Occupations: Television news anchor and reporter
- Years active: 2005–2023
- Employer: Jillian Mele Communications (2023-present)
- Parent(s): Roseanne Zlemek Mele; Thomas Mele
- Website: jillianbmele.com (Business site)

Jillian Mele (born September 17, 1982) is a former American news anchor and reporter who is best known for serving as co-host on Fox & Friends First from March 2017 to October 2021.

Following her departure from Fox News, Mele served as an anchor/reporter for WPVI-TV in Philadelphia from January 2022 to March 2023.

Mele is CEO of Jillian Mele Communications, a media mentoring business she created in early 2023.

== Biography ==
Mele was raised in Glenside, Pennsylvania, the daughter of Roseanne (née Zlemek) and Thomas Mele. She worked as a grocery store clerk in high school. In 2005, Mele graduated with a B.A. in arts and communication from La Salle University in Philadelphia. After school, she accepted a position as a sports anchor in Presque Isle, Maine and the WIVT-TV in Binghamton, New York. In 2007, she joined NBC 10 in Philadelphia, where she earned an Emmy award for her work on a show about the Olympics.

In 2014, she accepted a position with NBC Sports Philadelphia where she co-hosted a morning sports talk show called Breakfast on Broad where she earned another Emmy and a Philadelphia Eagles post-game program called Endgame. In March 2017, Mele accepted a position at Fox News where she served as co-anchor of Fox & Friends First and as headlines reporter for Fox & Friends until October 2021. On October 29, 2021, Mele announced that she would be leaving Fox News to return to La Salle University to pursue a Master's Degree. On her departure, Mele stated that "It's time to focus on my personal life."

In 2022, she accepted a position with WPVI-TV in Philadelphia. Mele left WPVI-TV in March 2023.

On April 13, 2023, Mele announced that she was launching her own business, Jillian Mele Communications, after deciding that she "wanted to try something else" following twenty years of working in the media industry.

== See also ==
- New Yorkers in journalism
- List of La Salle University people
