= Bob Sellers =

American journalist

Bob Sellers is a Newsmax TV anchor. He was previously a CNBC and Fox News anchor.

== Career ==
Sellers was an anchor on CNBC during the dot.com boom and bust. He co-anchored Today's Business' and Market Watch in addition to filling in as anchor on programs such as Squawk Box and Power Lunch. He joined Fox News Channel in 2002, regularly anchoring Fox News Live. He also reported live from Iraq during June 2003. Currently, he is a news anchor on NewsMaxTV and co-host of American Agenda.

Sellers worked for KING-TV in Seattle, WA, KENS-TV in San Antonio, TX, and KTVL in Medford, OR. He joined WTTG Fox 5 Morning News in Washington, DC in 2006 where he served as a morning news anchor until 2008. He then went to WSMV in Nashville where he was the primary anchor. While at WSMV, Sellers won an Emmy in 2010 for coverage of historic floods in the area. After leaving WSMV-TV, Sellers joined WZTV as morning news anchor. He left WZTV in 2016. Currently, Sellers is a news anchor on NewsMaxTV and co-host of American Agenda.

In February 2021, Sellers left in the middle of a segment with MyPillow CEO Mike Lindell after failing to stop his rigged-election rant in the wake of the 2020 presidential election.
