= The Real Housewives of New York City season 14 =

The Real Housewives of New York City
- Season 14
- Promotional poster via Peacock
- Starring: Sai De Silva; Ubah Hassan; Erin Lichy; Jenna Lyons; Jessel Taank; Brynn Whitfield
- No. of episodes: 16

Release
- Original network: Bravo
- Original release: July 16 – October 29, 2023

Season chronology
- ← Previous; Season 13 Next → Season 15

The fourteenth season of The Real Housewives of New York City, an American reality television series, is broadcast on Bravo. It premiered on July 16, 2023. The series is primarily filmed in New York City, New York. The season focuses on the lives of Sai De Silva, Ubah Hassan, Erin Lichy, Jenna Lyons, Jessel Taank and Brynn Whitfield.

This season marks the first time in the history of the Real Housewives franchise that a series has been entirely rebooted, as all of the women from the thirteenth season of the show were replaced with new cast members.

== Cast ==
On October 16, 2022, executive producer Andy Cohen revealed the reboot's cast by announcing that Sai De Silva, Ubah Hassan, Erin Lichy, Jenna Lyons, Lizzy Savetsky, Jessel Taank and Brynn Whitfield would be starring in the show's fourteenth season. One month later, Bravo announced Savetsky had exited the series after receiving anti-Semitic hate on social media; per the report, she had only filmed a "few times", and would not appear during the season. Subsequently, Savetsky was edited out of the show entirely and did not appear in any of the season's episodes.

Bravo promoted the fourteenth season by highlighting the career accomplishments and diversity of the cast. De Silva is a creative director and content creator, Hassan is a model, philanthropist, and owner of a hot sauce company, Lichy is a real estate agent and owner of a home renovation and design firm, Lyons is the former president and creative director of J.Crew and the co-founder and CEO of LoveSeen, Taank is a fashion publicist and brand consultant, and Whitfield is a brand marketing professional. De Silva is Afro-Latina, Hassan is Somali, Lichy is Israeli, Lyons is a lesbian, Taank is Indian, and Whitfield is biracial.

== Production ==
=== Development ===
After a low-rated and poorly received thirteenth season of the series that sparked significant backlash due to controversial and offensive remarks made by former Housewives Ramona Singer and Luann de Lesseps that many viewers perceived as being bigoted and racist, along with multiple human resources investigations into other racist comments allegedly made by Singer off camera, Bravo canceled the thirteenth season's reunion special in September 2021. Eboni K. Williams, the series' first Black cast member, later claimed that following the controversies her former co-stars Singer, de Lesseps, and Leah McSweeney told the network they would refuse to work with her if she returned to the show for another season.

In March 2022, Cohen announced that the network had decided to reboot and recast the show entirely from scratch and that none of the women that starred in the show's thirteenth season would be returning to the series. He stated that diversifying the show was one of the network's top priorities and said, "There are thousands of stories to tell here. This is the most multicultural, diverse, and energetic and exciting city in America: We are searching for a multicultural group of friends who really best reflect the most exciting city in the country. We're looking for a group of women who are real friends, and who are of diverse backgrounds, races and religions." The show had been widely criticized for having an entirely white cast prior to the hiring of Williams in the show's thirteenth season.

=== Filming ===
Filming for the fourteenth season began in October 2022 and concluded in February 2023. In May 2023, the network released a trailer and announced the season would premiere on July 16 of the same year. Bravo dubbed the reboot a "new era" for the series, and said that it would "follow an all-new group of six dynamic women who run in the same social circles, thriving in one of the most diverse and electric cities in the world." Cohen praised the reboot and its cast by saying the season turned out great and the women are aspirational, funny, fashionable and enjoyable to watch. He acknowledged that the reboot is "different" than the original series but said he feels it's perfect in its own way.

Hassan said filming the show was a very positive experience and that she was grateful for the close friendships and sisterhood that formed between her and her cast members. Whitfield expressed the importance of being herself and having fun while filming and revealed she was honest about her difficult upbringing as a child. Lyons and Taank both commented on the power of representation, with Lyons stating that she wanted to join the show in order to inform others about her experiences as a lesbian woman and represent the LGBTQ community in a positive light, which she was motivated to do in response to the absence of lesbian representation she saw in the media while growing up. Taank shared similar sentiments about the lack of Indian representation in media and said it was an honor to be the series' first Indian Housewife and share her culture with the audience. Sai De Silva stated that the cast was interested in creating their own legacy and doing things differently than they were done in the previous iteration of the show.

Shed Media produces the series for Bravo. The fourteenth season is executive produced by Lisa Shannon, Lauren Volonakis, Barrie Bernstein, Anne Swan and Cohen. Rajah Ahmed, Kate Murphy, Alfonso Rosales and Kimmy Cucci are co-executive producers.

== Episodes ==
The Real Housewives of New York City season 14 episodes
No. overall	No. in season	Title	Original release date	U.S. viewers (millions)
259	1	"New Era, New York"	July 16, 2023	0.67
Sai invites Brynn and Jessel to her home for champagne and Erin meets with Ubah in Washington Square Park for coffee. Brynn informs Sai that Erin has been talking about her behind her back while Erin vents to Ubah about Brynn and Sai ditching her after she invited them out to dinner. Brynn says that Erin is upset because Sai insulted a charcuterie board she served at a party, which Sai denies doing. Jessel meets with Jenna to talk about Jenna's upcoming girls' night event and later tells Erin what Brynn said about her. When the ladies meet at Jenna's apartment for girls' night, they bond and get to know each other on a deeper level by answering Jenna's icebreaker questions. Erin eventually confronts Brynn for spreading lies but Brynn declares that she's telling the truth. The two talk privately, make amends and agree to move on. Erin and Brynn then jokingly raid Jenna's closet together.
260	2	"Oh Christmas Tree!"	July 23, 2023	0.51
Erin invites the ladies to her home in The Hamptons. Brynn calls Ubah to say she'll be arriving late because she's sick. During their car ride to The Hamptons, Jessel reveals to Ubah and Sai that she hasn't had sex with her husband Pavit since she became pregnant with the couple's twin boys two years prior. At Erin's house, Jenna talks to the group about the recent death of her mother and their rocky relationship. Jenna gifts all of the women lingerie and the ladies tell Jessel she can use it to spice up her love life. Later that night at a restaurant, Jenna opens up about her sexuality and being outed by the New York Post and Jessel talks about the fertility struggles she has endured. The women begin to annoy Erin by complaining about the accommodations at her home. Ubah makes the group laugh with her various eccentric antics. Back at Erin's house, everyone tries on the lingerie Jenna gifted them. Jessel insults her green lingerie by calling it hideous and comparing it to a Christmas tree, which offends Jenna.
261	3	"Two Truths and No Shakshuka"	July 30, 2023	0.45
At the beginning of the group's second day in The Hamptons, the women discuss Jenna leaving Erin's house the night before. Jenna eventually returns and is confronted about not sleeping at Erin's house. Jenna defends herself by saying she had to wake up early for a work call and the other women were partying and playing music, preventing her from sleeping. The ladies have a morning workout with Erin's trainer David, during which time Brynn arrives. Brynn and Ubah both flirt with David. Jenna apologizes to Erin for leaving the night before and Erin forgives her. The ladies go out to lunch where Brynn calls out Erin for having a double standard, saying Erin is more forgiving of Jenna than she is of her. Erin responds by saying she likes Jenna more than she likes Brynn but Brynn insinuates Erin is kinder to Jenna because of Jenna's fame and status. The group then criticizes Jessel for constantly complaining and insulting the lingerie Jenna gifted her. Back at Erin's, the women play a sexy game of two truths and a lie. Afterwards, Sai opens up about her upbringing and growing up poor.
262	4	"The Most Brynnteresting Girl in the Room"	August 6, 2023	0.47
The women have breakfast together where they taste Ubah's hot sauce Ubah Hot. Everyone discusses their Thanksgiving plans and Brynn reveals that her parents are not a part of her life. Back in the city, Sai decides to throw a Friendsgiving party for Brynn. Ubah meets with her friend Kathleen and discusses struggling to accept help from investors for her hot sauce company and breaks down when she talks about the loneliness she feels following the death of her mother. Brynn opens up about being raised by her white grandmother in South Bend, Indiana. She explains that she grew up feeling ashamed of her race after being bullied in school for being biracial, until she eventually found community with the Black women who worked at a local hair salon. Jessel vents to her husband about feeling ganged up on by Erin and Sai. Meanwhile, Jenna tells Erin that Jessel called Erin and Sai cackling hags behind their backs. At Sai's Friendsgiving event, news spreads about Jessel's unkind words. Over dinner, Brynn cries when she explains the abuse and neglect she faced at the hands of her parents, which led to her being adopted by her grandmother.
263	5	"Fashionably Absent"	August 13, 2023	0.44
Jessel invites the ladies to her upcoming charity event. Jenna claims she already has another event she's going to that night and cannot attend. Afterwards, Erin confronts Jessel for calling her and Sai cackling hags but Jessel maintains that the comment was only a joke. Then Erin offends Jessel when she says she was unaware that Jessel was still working after the birth of her twins, which Jessel takes as a dig at her career. The next day, Jessel and Erin meet for coffee to discuss the recent tension between them. Erin tells Jessel that they're very different people and that she thinks Jessel expects to be catered to. Jessel expresses that she's hurt by Erin's comments about her career and implies that Erin doesn't embrace working women. Afterwards, Erin meets with Sai and Brynn where they discuss their frustrations with Jessel and her lack of accountability. At Jessel's charity event, the ladies FaceTime Jenna and discover she's at home decorating for Christmas with her son and lied to Jessel about having another event to attend. After Erin arrives, Jessel apologizes for the comments she made during their previous conversation.
264	6	"Anniversorry, Not Sorry"	August 20, 2023	0.56
Ubah and Erin go jewelry shopping together for Erin's upcoming 10-year wedding anniversary party and Erin fills Ubah in about her recent conflict with Jessel. Jenna discusses her interior design work and has a meeting with actress Emily Hampshire about designing her new home. Erin and her husband Abe go out to dinner and reminiscence about the early days of their relationship and Abe's proposal. Jessel and Pavit bicker about where they're going to send their twin boys for preschool. While the women are getting ready for Erin's anniversary party, Ubah calls Erin to tell her she can't attend after being diagnosed with COVID-19. At the party, Brynn jokingly flirts with Abe by telling him to remember that she's single after he gets a divorce. Jenna talks to Sai and Jessel about her recent break-up. Later, the group begins to complain that the party is boring and are chastised by Erin's sister Kelley for talking while Erin and Abe's friends are giving speeches. Sai upsets Erin by leaving the party early and not saying goodbye, after telling the other women that Erin has no food for her to eat.
265	7	"You Wreath What You Sow"	August 27, 2023	0.52
Jenna has a model casting call for her false eyelash brand LoveSeen. Abe tells Erin about the flirty comments Brynn made to him at their anniversary party, which upsets Erin. Brynn goes car shopping with her ex-fiancé Gideon and expresses her desire to freeze her eggs so that she can eventually have a family. Jessel talks to Pavit about wanting to have a third child. Afterwards, Jessel goes out with her mother Nilam and opens up to her about undergoing in vitro fertilization for the first time. The ladies, sans Ubah who is still sick with COVID-19, meet up to make wreaths together. Erin confronts Sai for leaving her anniversary party early, claiming Sai has no manners. Sai says she felt justified in leaving the party early, reiterating again that Erin had no food that she could eat as a pescatarian. Erin then calls out Brynn for her comments to Abe, stating she was offended that Brynn would mention divorce to her husband, but Brynn says she was only kidding. Eventually, Erin storms out after Brynn gets defensive and proclaims that her anniversary party was boring.
266	8	"Business Classy"	September 3, 2023	0.46
Sai goes shopping with Ubah for the group's upcoming vacation to Anguilla and fills Ubah in about everything she has missed while being sick at home. Jenna opens up about the insecurities she feels about her body due to a rare genetic disorder she has called incontinentia pigmenti, which affects her skin, teeth, and hair. Meanwhile, Brynn and her brother discuss the impact their traumatic childhoods have had on their romantic relationships. Erin goes to Jenna's apartment to discuss the group's upcoming vacation and Jenna says she's flying to Anguilla early so that she can get a tan before the other women arrive. In the midst of the conversation, Jenna also reveals that she's leaving early so that she doesn't have to fly coach. After the women arrive in Anguilla, Erin tells everyone about her conversation with Jenna. Later, the group confronts Jenna about not wanting to fly with them. Jenna explains that she prefers to get a tan because it makes her feel more confident about the scars she has on her body due to her genetic disorder, but the other women think she is deflecting to avoid taking responsibility for saying she didn't want to fly coach.
267	9	"Nothing Vanilla About Anguilla"	September 10, 2023	0.55
The group goes out to dinner together where Erin and Brynn begin to bicker after Brynn apologizes for calling Erin's anniversary party boring but not for flirting with Abe. Brynn says she was offended that Erin would accuse her of something as horrible as flirting with a married man. After Erin explains that she doesn't believe Brynn had ill intent behind her actions but that they were still hurtful, Brynn apologizes for her comments to Abe. The women then tell Jenna that they don't feel she is open and vulnerable with them and Jenna gets emotional when she describes growing up with her mother, who had Asperger syndrome and lacked emotion and social skills. Due to this, Jenna says she finds it difficult to be emotionally vulnerable with others. The next morning, Sai decides to connect with Jenna by talking about her own mother who suffered from alcoholism and died of a heart attack. Afterwards, the women decide to have a fun photoshoot on the beach. Tensions rise between Erin and Brynn again after Erin accuses Brynn of lying about an experience she had with a doctor when inquiring about freezing her eggs. Later, the two eventually make up.
268	10	"Naughty-ical by Nature"	September 17, 2023	0.48 (Note: Season 14, Episode 10 was erroneously listed as a rerun by Nielsen and thus appeared on a rerun ratings chart.)
Erin and Brynn discuss the stories Jessel has been telling about her family's struggles and speculate that Jessel is lying about her background in order to sound less privileged. The women go out on a boat together where Brynn and Jenna playfully flirt with each other. Erin and Sai accuse Jessel of exaggerating and being dishonest about her background and the three get into an argument. Ubah defends Jessel, pointing out that the group attacks Jessel and accuses her of lying no matter what she says. Erin recounts Ubah pushing her in the pool as a prank the day before and reveals her intentions to get Ubah back. That night, Sai pushes Ubah in the pool but Erin says she doesn't consider it to be official payback because she wasn't the one to push Ubah. Erin later hides Ubah's phone for 45 minutes as payback for Ubah's prank. The next morning, Ubah says that Erin hiding her phone prevented her from contacting her family to tell them she was safe. Erin gets an attitude with Ubah after Ubah refuses to speak to her, leading to a heated confrontation between the two where Ubah pulls Erin's sunglasses off of her face.
269	11	"The Case of the Missing Phone"	September 24, 2023	0.50
Following Ubah and Erin's altercation, Ubah tells Erin she's going to keep her sunglasses for 45 minutes, the same amount of time Erin had Ubah's phone the night before. The women go out to a local bar and on the car ride there Ubah tells Brynn that Erin previously called her a social climber behind her back. At the bar, Ubah gives Erin her sunglasses back after the 45 minutes passes. However, the two continue to argue and Erin eventually leaves to go back to the vacation house early. After the rest of the ladies get back to the house, they get into the hot tub together where Brynn, Jessel, and Ubah confront Erin for the rude comments she has made about the other women and her lack of accountability for talking behind their backs. Erin accuses Ubah of turning the other women against her and begins to cry, saying she feels ganged up on. Ubah comforts Erin and the two have a conversation where they make amends and Ubah apologizes to Erin for taking her sunglasses. Afterwards, the women have their final dinner together in Anguilla where they discuss fashion and the best outfits they've seen each other wear.
270	12	"Well Healed"	October 1, 2023	0.46
Back in New York, Jessel and Pavit plan a staycation to reignite the passion in their marriage. Jenna and Brynn go out to a gay bar together and Brynn plays wingwoman by helping Jenna find a date. Brynn goes shopping for antique books and talks with her brother Daris about her intention to purchase a tree in Central Park in memory of their grandmother who recently died. Ubah hosts a healing event for the ladies so the group can move past the issues they had with each other in Anguilla. At the event, Ubah cries about the loss of her mother and Jessel reveals that Pavit is going on a trip to Vietnam without her. Later, Sai and Jessel have lunch together to discuss the argument they had in Anguilla. Jessel attempts to explain that she was hurt by Sai and Erin's response to her sharing about herself and her family, saying she only wanted to connect with the group. Sai remains frustrated with Jessel, claiming Jessel constantly compares her story to Sai's despite Sai feeling their stories are incomparable. Jessel is turned off by Sai's cold attitude towards her and the two remain unable to see eye to eye.
271	13	"A Night at Swingers"	October 8, 2023	0.42
Sai recounts her tense lunch with Jessel to Erin and the two begin to gossip about Pavit's trip to Vietnam, insinuating that Pavit is traveling alone so that he can cheat on Jessel. Ubah collaborates with one of her favorite restaurants Beatnic to create a signature dish using Ubah Hot. Sai spends the day cooking with her aunt Sufia and the two reminisce about Sai's mother. Erin hosts a couples' night event for the group where Pavit is questioned about his trip to Vietnam. Jessel and Sai get into another argument after Sai says she was offended that Jessel compared her uncle's alcoholism to Sai's mother's and once again accuses Jessel of lying about things she tells the group. Sai's husband David questions Ubah about why she is still single which leads to Ubah confiding in Sai about a man she has recently began dating and Sai promises that she won't reveal Ubah's secret to the other women. Later, Brynn informs Jessel that Sai and Erin claimed Pavit said at Couple's Night that he married Jessel because she lets him do whatever he wants. Jessel then begins to cry, saying she feels Erin and Sai are bullying her.
272	14	"Connecticut-ing the Dots"	October 15, 2023	0.52
Brynn and Sai visit Central Park where Brynn officially purchases a tree in memory of her late grandmother. Later, Sai and Erin go shopping for Brynn's upcoming masquerade-themed birthday party. Erin informs Sai that Ubah was upset about Sai's husband David asking why she is still single and in response Sai reveals to Erin that Ubah has recently began dating someone new, breaking the promise she made with Ubah to keep the information private. At Brynn's birthday party, David apologizes to Ubah for questioning her about being single. Jessel gives Erin and Sai the cold shoulder when she arrives at the party, leading to Erin confronting Jessel. Jessel explains that she is hurt by Erin and Sai continuously gossiping about her marriage and says that she is choosing to keep her distance as a result. After Ubah receives a call from her boyfriend, Brynn announces to the party that she knows Ubah's boyfriend lives in Connecticut, which upsets Ubah and angers Sai, who also revealed private information about Ubah's boyfriend to Brynn. Sai lashes out at Brynn for repeating what she told her about Ubah's boyfriend and storms out of the party, leaving the future of their friendship in question.
273	15	"Reunion Part 1"	October 22, 2023	0.54
The women reunite to look back on the events of the season. Sai and Erin argue about negative comments Erin made about Sai on a recent podcast. Sai then calls Erin a liar who refuses to take accountability for the things she says about the other women. Ubah accuses Jenna of being inauthentic on camera. Jenna talks about the tumultuous and strained relationship she had with her late mother and how it influenced the way she mothers her own son. Brynn expresses her fears about becoming a mother. Brynn, Ubah, and Sai open up about their traumas and deaths in their families. Ubah and Jenna reveal details about their new relationships. The women apologize to Jenna for questioning her about flying first class to Anguilla. Sai and Brynn discuss the state of their fractured friendship after Brynn revealed secret information Sai told her about Ubah's boyfriend. Jessel confronts Erin and Sai for talking about her marriage and insinuating that her husband is cheating on her behind her back.
274	16	"Reunion Part 2"	October 29, 2023	0.54
Erin and Sai explain why they were critical of Jessel for the way in which she shared her family's backstory. Sai opens up about her mother's alcoholism and breaks down when she reveals the last time she saw her mother before her death. Brynn delves deeper into her upbringing and talks about reconnecting with her father before his death as well as her relationship with her ex-fiancé Gideon. Erin and Brynn talk about the status of their friendship after their issues during the season. Ubah and Erin discuss their heated argument in Anguilla and Ubah expresses to the group why she was upset about not being able to contact her family after her phone was stolen. Ubah calls out Jenna for taking Erin's side in Anguilla and making hurtful comments about her. Ubah begins crying after Brynn takes up for Jenna, saying that she feels none of the other women ever defend her. Afterwards, Jenna apologizes to Ubah for her comments and the women console Ubah and tell her they have her back. The women share their final thoughts about the season and what they've learned by being on the show.

== Ratings ==
The fourteenth season premiere was watched by 1.7 million viewers across all platforms (including linear, digital, and Peacock) after three days, with 1.2 million of those viewers being in the 18–49 key demographic, marking a 29% increase in key demographic viewership from the thirteenth season's overall demo average.
