= Cass Bird =

American artist, photographer and director

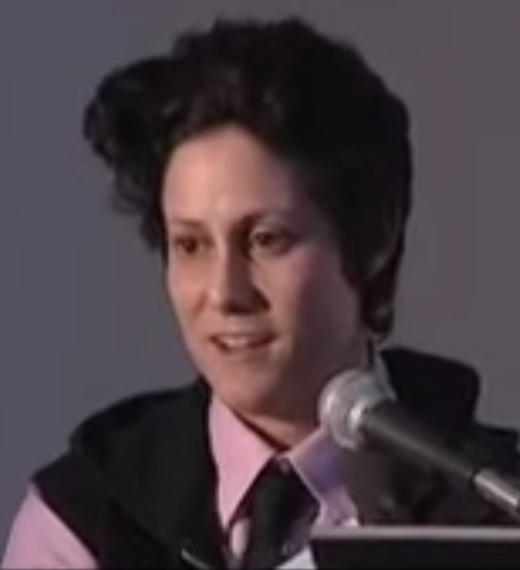
- At the Brooklyn Museum in 2007
- Born: 1974 (age 51–52); Los Angeles, California, U.S.
- Known for: Photography
- Partner(s): Ali Bird (2003–2022); Jenna Lyons (2023–present)
- Children: 2
- Website: www.cassbird.com

Cass Bird (born 1974) is an artist, photographer, and director who lives and works in New York City.

== Exhibitions ==
Bird has exhibited widely within the United States and abroad, in exhibitions including Global Feminisms at the Brooklyn Museum, New York (2007); JD's Lesbian Utopia at Deitch Projects, New York (2005) with JD Samson; Log Cabin at Artists Space, New York (2005); the A&C Festival for the Emerging Artists, New York; Macro Future at Museo d'Arte Contemporanea di Roma in Rome, Italy; New York Minute at Palazzo Cavour in Turin, Italy. Bird has also exhibited at the Brooklyn Museum, which has also acquired Bird's work for its permanent collection. Bird was a part of the Brooklyn Museum Elizabeth A. Sackler Center for Feminist Art's Feminist Art Base. She has had solo exhibitions at Brewery Art Colony, Los Angeles, and at Deitch Projects, New York. Her work has also been exhibited in group shows at Spring Street Gallery, New York; Dumba Collective, Brooklyn, New York; Artists Space, New York; Great Hall Gallery at Cooper Union, New York; Jan Larsen Fine Art, New York; One Institute, Los Angeles; as well as the Art + Commerce Festival of Emerging Photographers in Japan, Madrid, and Brooklyn. Bird's work is included in the permanent collections of the Brooklyn Museum and the Smith College Museum of Art. She currently lives and works in New York.

== Photography ==
As a fashion photographer, Bird has worked for publications such as The New York Times Magazine, Rolling Stone, GQ, Nylon, Out, and Paper Magazine. Other commercial clients have included eyewear company Warby Parker, GAP, Levi's, Wrangler, True Religion, Nike, and Champion. She has photographed actors, models, and musicians, as well as her own friends and family. Notable subjects include as Jay-Z, M.I.A, Paz de la Huerta, Lily Allen, Karen Elson, Daniel Radcliffe, Freja Beha Erichsen, Daria Werbowy, Andrew Garfield, Adam Driver, Viggo Mortensen and Connor Storrie. She is represented worldwide by Art+Commerce.

== Film ==
Bird made her directorial debut with a film for fashion brand Sophomore. She continued to go on to produce work for Levi's, JCrew, Urban Outfitters, Wrangler, Lissy Trullie, The Raveonettes, Keds, Maiyet, and Sky Ferreira. She has also directed films with subjects including Jay-Z, Cate Blanchett, and Salma Hayek.

== Publications ==
In February 2012, Bird released her book Rewilding with publisher Damiani. The book was shot over two weeks in the summers of 2009 and 2010, with its focus on the natural setting of an artists' community in Tennessee. Sally Singer of Vogue wrote the book's foreword. Singer introduces the book as "an exquisite and sly celebration of femininity of a very modern stripe."

== Personal life ==
From 2003 to 2022, Cass Bird was in a relationship with bookings agent Ali Bird. Together, they have two children, Leo and Mae.

In July 2023, Bird announced her relationship with Jenna Lyons on Instagram.

== See also ==
- LGBT culture in New York City
- List of LGBT people from New York City
- NYC Pride March
