= Eboni K. Williams =

American attorney and television host

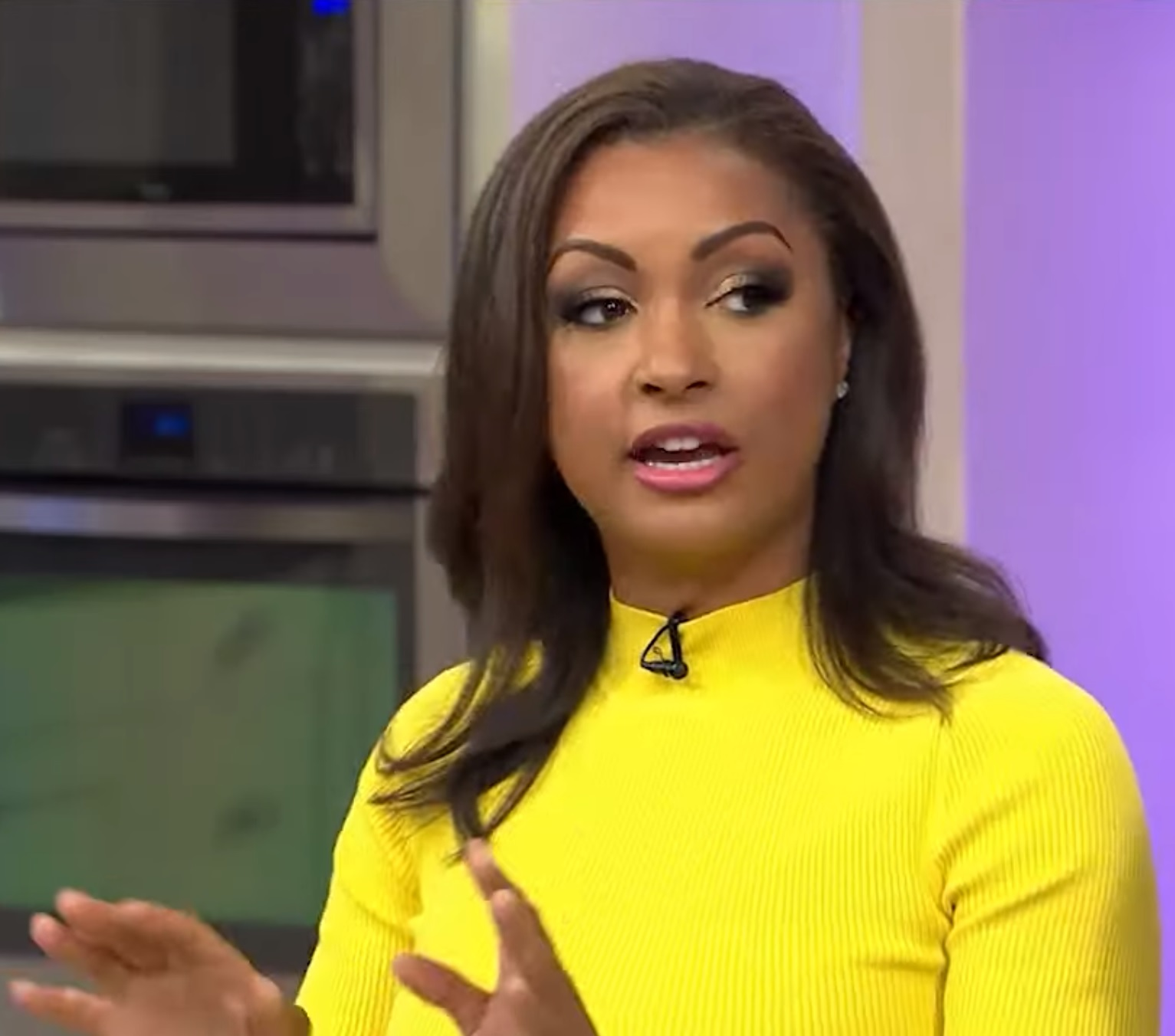
- Williams in 2019
- Born: Eboni Kiuhnna Williams; September 9, 1983 (age 43); Independence, Louisiana, U.S.
- Education: University of North Carolina, Chapel Hill (BA); Loyola University, New Orleans (JD)
- Occupations: Lawyer; broadcast personality
- Known for: Equal Justice with Judge Eboni K. Williams, The Real Housewives of New York City

Eboni Kiuhnna Williams (born September 9, 1983) is an American lawyer and television host. She hosts the nightly news show The Grio with Eboni K. Williams on TheGrio. She co-hosted a talk show on WABC Radio in New York City and was a co-host of Fox News' 2017 show Fox News Specialists. In October 2020, she was cast in The Real Housewives of New York City for its thirteenth season.

== Early life ==
Williams was raised by a single mother, who was a bus driver, cosmetologist and entrepreneur. She went to high school at Northwest School of the Arts. She received her Bachelor of Arts in Communications and African American studies from the University of North Carolina at Chapel Hill, and her Juris Doctor from Loyola University New Orleans College of Law. As a law student, Williams clerked for the Louisiana Secretary of State and the Louisiana Attorney General's office, and assisted New Orleans council-members in the aftermath of Hurricane Katrina.

== Career ==
In 2008, Williams provided legal counsel in family law and civil litigation. She was a public defender and returned to private practice in 2010. Williams provided representation for clients in homicide, rape, drug, sex crime, and federal offense cases. She was a correspondent for CBS News and a contributor for Fox News, with appearances on Hannity and The O’Reilly Factor, and has appeared as a co-host on Outnumbered and The Five. Williams was a co-host for the Fox News Specialists afternoon show that first aired on May 1, 2017, with co-hosts Eric Bolling and Katherine Timpf. The show was created after the departure of Bill O'Reilly to rebuild the Fox News Channel lineup. Fox News Specialists was cancelled on September 8, 2017, after Eric Bolling departed from the network amid sexual harassment allegations.

On June 5, 2017, Williams joined WABC Radio as co-host of a noon-to-3 p.m. talk show along with long-time radio personality Curtis Sliwa, replacing Ron Kuby as Sliwa's co-host on the show. Her last show aired on October 18, 2017.

Williams described her time with Fox as "challenging. But I knew that, and I didn't go there to be comfortable. Let me be clear: I did not walk into Fox News to be comfortable; I walked in there to disrupt."

Williams hosts the program The Grio with Eboni K. Williams on TheGrio.

In October 2020, she was cast as the first African-American member of The Real Housewives of New York City, joining its 13th season before the show's recast in season 14.

Williams also hosted one season of Dark Nights in the City, from December 2022 to February 2023, a show that told the true stories behind some of the notorious crimes in New York City.

In addition, Williams hosts The Grio News with Eboni K. Williams on TheGrio and as of September 11, 2023, she is the presiding judge on the first-run syndication court show Equal Justice with Judge Eboni K. Williams. She also hosts the podcast Holding Court

== Personal life ==
Williams was engaged to billionaire Steven Glenn, the Chief Operating Officer at Warburg Pincus, for 3 years until they broke up during the COVID-19 pandemic.

At the age of 34, Williams froze her eggs and six years later, at the age of 40, she decided to have a child via in vitro fertilization. On September 23, 2024, Eboni K. Williams announced on her Instagram page that she had given birth to a daughter named Liberty Alexandria Williams.

== Bibliography ==
- Pretty Powerful: Appearance, Substance, and Success. Viva Editions. 2017. ISBN 978-1635966626.
- Bet on Black: The Good News about Being Black in America Today. Legacy Lit. 2023. ISBN 978-0306828645.

== Awards and nominations ==
Year	Organization	Award	Nominated work	Result	Ref.
2023	New York City Office of the Mayor	Civic Courage Award for Community Building	Herself	Honored	
2023	NAACP Image Awards	Outstanding News and Information Podcast	Holding Court with Eboni K. Williams	Nominated	
2024	NAACP Image Awards	Outstanding News and Information Podcast	Holding Court with Eboni K. Williams	Won	
