= Kat Timpf =

American television personality (born 1988)

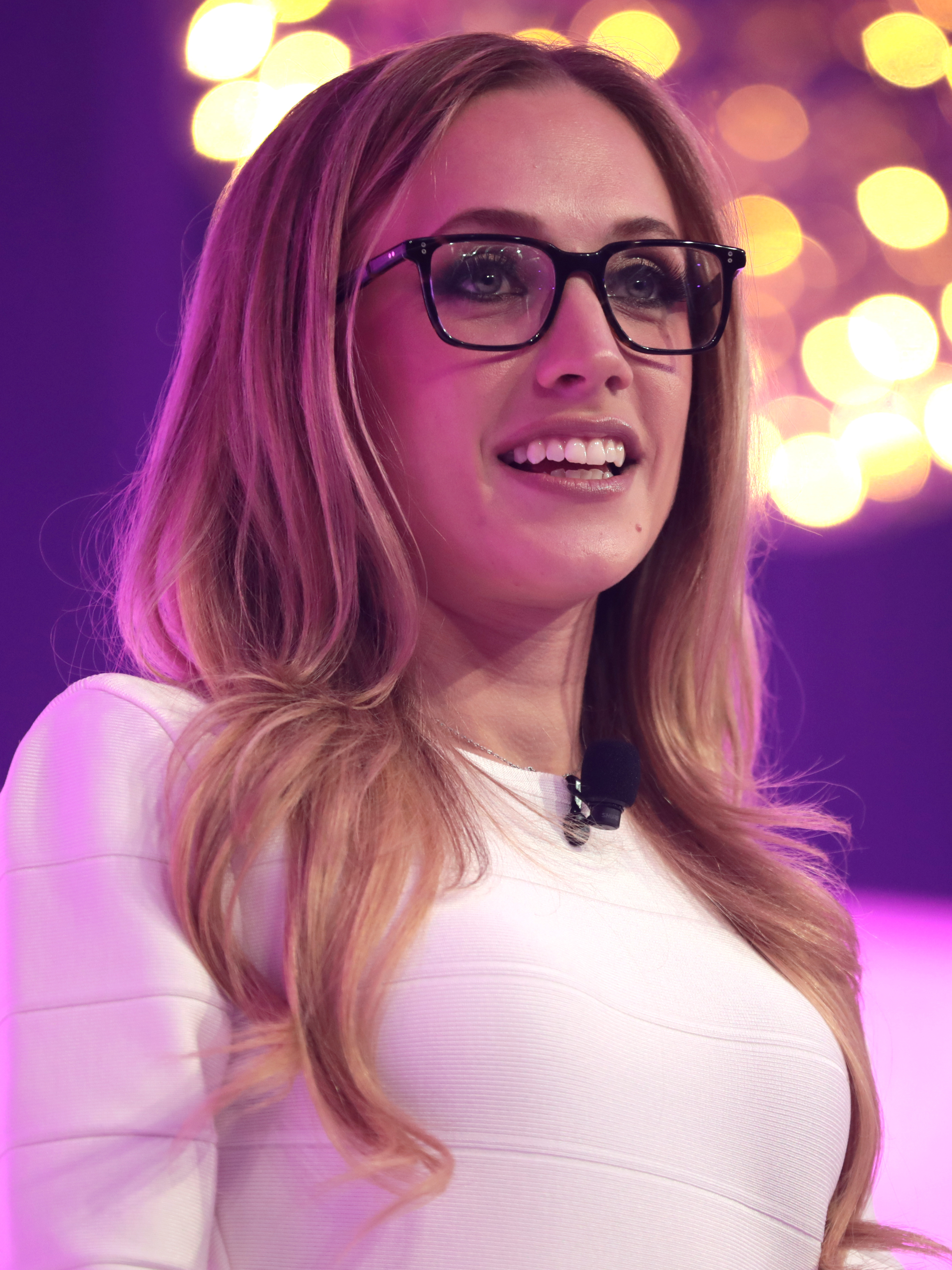
- Timpf in 2021
- Born: Katherine Clare Timpf; October 29, 1988 (age 37); Detroit, Michigan, U.S.
- Education: Hillsdale College (BA)
- Occupation: Television personality
- Known for: Gutfeld!, Fox News Specialists
- Political party: Independent / Libertarian
- Spouse: Cameron Friscia (m. 2021)
- Children: 1
- Website: therealkattimpf.com

Katherine Clare Timpf (/tɪmf/; born October 29, 1988) is an American libertarian columnist, television personality, reporter, comedian and author. She is a regular panelist on Fox News Channel's Gutfeld! and appears as a contributor on various other Fox News shows. In 2017, Timpf co-hosted Fox News Specialists alongside Eric Bolling and Eboni K. Williams. Beginning in 2019, she has hosted the Fox Nation show Sincerely, Kat.

== Early life and education ==
Timpf is from Detroit, Michigan. She graduated magna cum laude in 2010 from Hillsdale College with a B.A. in English. While at Hillsdale she was a member of Chi Omega sorority.

== Career ==
Timpf worked for the Leadership Institute's CampusReform.org in Arlington, Virginia. She has worked as a digital editor for The Washington Times, as the news anchor for NASA's Third Rock Radio, and as a producer and reporter for Total Traffic Network in Santa Ana, California. Timpf was a 2012 Robert Novak Journalism Fellowship Program grant award recipient through The Fund for American Studies, and completed a project titled, "As California Goes, So Goes the Nation: The Consequences of Following Golden State Policy."

Timpf has appeared on television and radio programs, including America Live with Megyn Kelly, Your World with Neil Cavuto, Fox and Friends, Red Eye, Stossel, Gutfeld! (co-host/panelist), The Five, Outnumbered, The Big Weekend Show and The Nightly Show with Larry Wilmore. Timpf has been a contributor to Orange County Register, Investor's Business Daily, Pittsburgh Post-Gazette, International Business Times and The Washington Times. She was also a comedian during the morning drive radio program on Baltimore's 98 Rock.

In November 2015, Timpf said that she received death threats after making satirical remarks about the Star Wars fandom.

In 2016 and 2017, she contributed to the Barstool Sports website. She hosted a weekly podcast called The Kat Timpf Show, in which she talks to a guest about random subjects, including her personal life.

On May 1, 2017, Timpf became a co-host for Fox News Channel's afternoon show called Fox News Specialists with co-hosts Eric Bolling and Eboni K. Williams. Fox News Specialists was canceled on September 8, 2017, after Bolling was fired by the network for alleged sexual misconduct.

Timpf co-hosted the weekly Fox News Radio podcast Tyrus and Timpf from 2018 through 2023, with former professional wrestler Tyrus.

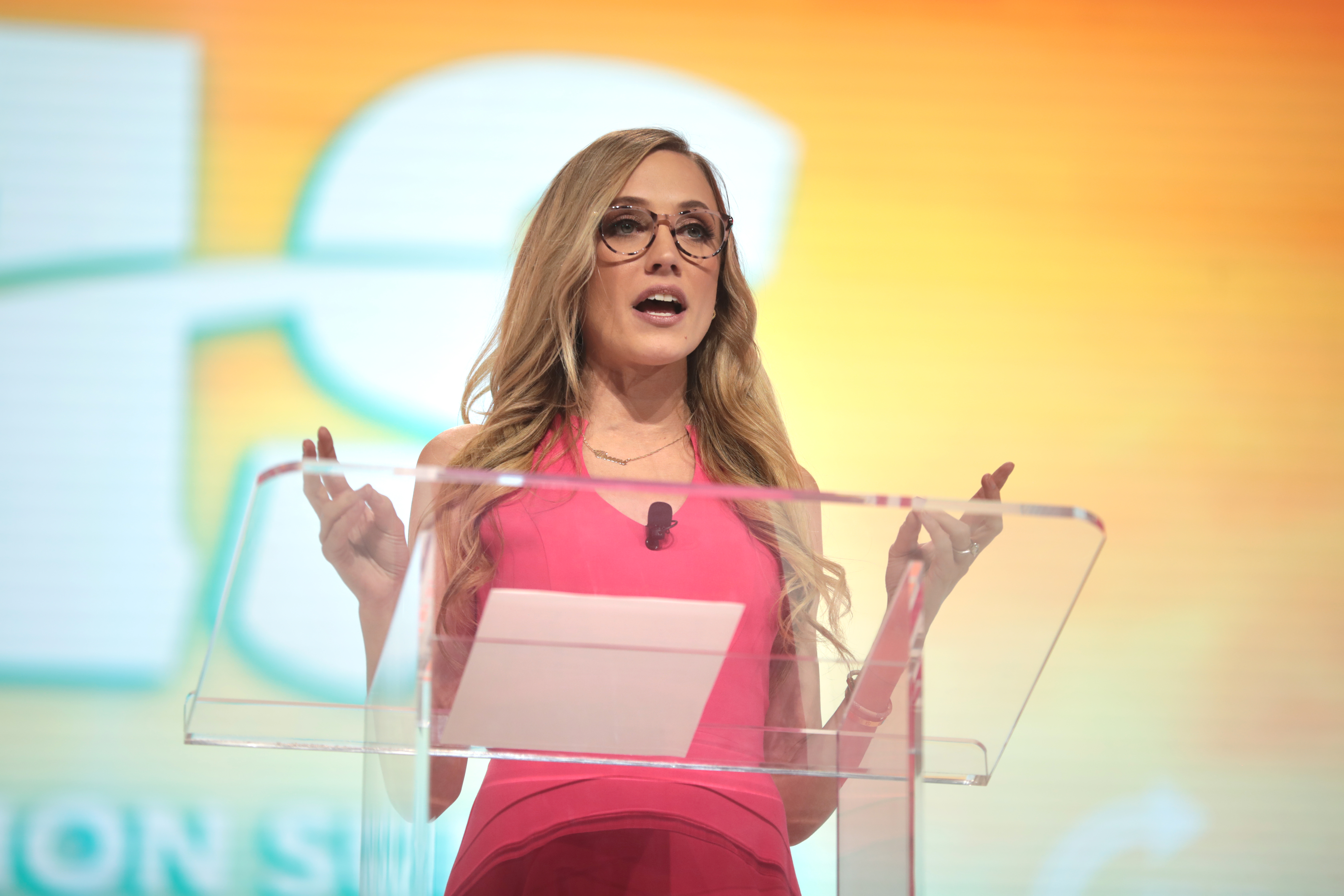
Timpf speaking at the 2021 Student Action Summit hosted by Turning Point USA

On February 8, 2023, Timpf announced on Gutfeld! that she had written a book titled You Can't Joke About That. The book was released on April 18, 2023. It became a New York Times Best Seller, as did Timpf's second book, I Used to Like You Until…, which came out September 10, 2024.

Timpf served as a regular host of the weekend comedy show Fox News Saturday Night from June 2023 through December 2023.

In 2023, Timpf was selected for the New Power New York List by Variety.

In 2024, Timpf partnered with the non-profit Tunnel to Towers Foundation, selling shirts to benefit families of veterans killed in the line of duty. In the same year, Timpf went on her "I Used to Like You" comedy tour, which included a stop at the Scherr Forum Theatre in Thousand Oaks, California.

In June 2025, Timpf joined Jon Taffer on the season 9 finale episode of Bar Rescue. Taffer previously appeared on Gutfeld! with her.

== Ideology ==
Timpf is a libertarian and believes in limited government, no involvement in economic policy, and allowing social decisions to be made by the individual. According to Timpf, "there is something about me for everyone to hate, but there is also something about me for everyone to agree on." Timpf has said she voted third-party, and opposes deporting people who are peaceful and gainfully employed.

== Personal life ==
Timpf lives in Manhattan. She was raised as a Roman Catholic and remained a devout Catholic until the age of 17, when she moved away from the faith.

In 2024, Timpf revealed that she has been romantically involved with women as well as men. Timpf announced her engagement to Cameron Friscia in August 2020, and they were married on May 1, 2021. They met on the dating app Raya. On July 31, 2024, Timpf announced that she and Friscia were expecting their first child. Timpf announced the birth of their first child, a boy, on February 25, 2025. She also shared that 15 hours before she gave birth, she was diagnosed with Stage 0 breast cancer. Timpf announced that she intended to undergo a double mastectomy. In June 2025, she shared on Gutfeld! that the surgery had successfully removed all of her cancer. On September 23, 2026, Timpf announced she and her husband were expecting their second child together.

Timpf has credited her husband for supporting her career by actively co-parenting with her. She believes that those who want women to consider motherhood should put more focus on encouraging men to become supportive partners.

== Books ==
- You Can't Joke About That: Why Everything Is Funny, Nothing Is Sacred, and We're All in This Together, Broadside Books (2023)
- I Used to Like You Until...: (How Binary Thinking Divides Us), Threshold Editions (2024)
