= The Real Housewives of New York City season 15 =

The Real Housewives of New York City
- Season 15
- Promotional poster via Peacock
- Starring: Sai De Silva; Ubah Hassan; Erin Lichy; Jenna Lyons; Jessel Taank; Brynn Whitfield; Racquel Chevremont
- No. of episodes: 17

Release
- Original network: Bravo
- Original release: October 1, 2024 – February 4, 2025

Season chronology
- ← Previous; Season 14

The fifteenth season of The Real Housewives of New York City, an American reality television series, is broadcast on Bravo. It premiered on October 1, 2024. The series was primarily filmed in New York City, New York. Its executive producers are Lisa Shannon, Lauren Volonakis, Anne Swan and Andy Cohen.

The season focuses on the lives of Sai De Silva, Ubah Hassan, Erin Lichy, Jenna Lyons, Jessel Taank, Brynn Whitfield and Racquel Chevremont, with Rebecca Minkoff appearing as a friend of the housewives. Chevremont, Hassan, Lyons, and Whitfield announced their departures from the franchise following the conclusion of the season.

== Cast ==
In March 2024, Bravo announced the series was renewed for a fifteenth season, with all six housewives from the fourteenth season returning. In April 2024, it was announced that fashion designer Rebecca Minkoff would be joining the series in a friend of capacity. In June 2024, it was announced that model and art curator Racquel Chevremont would also be joining the fifteenth season of the series as a full-time housewife. Chevremont's casting marks the first time in the history of the Real Housewives franchise that a cast has included two openly gay women.

== Production ==
Filming for the fifteenth season began in March 2024 and concluded in June 2024. The fifteenth season's reunion was filmed on December 12, 2024. The Real Housewives of New York City is produced by Shed Media for Bravo. Lisa Shannon, Lauren Volonakis, Anne Swan and Andy Cohen are recognized as the series' executive producers. Eric Fuller and Alfonso Rosales serve as co-executive producers.

== Episodes ==
The Real Housewives of New York City season 15 episodes
| No. overall | No. in season | Title | Original release date | U.S. viewers (millions) |
|---|---|---|---|---|
| 275 | 1 | "Apple of My Lie" | October 1, 2024 | 0.31 |
| 276 | 2 | "You Can Run But You Can't Ride" | October 8, 2024 | 0.35 |
| 277 | 3 | "Dramamine Drama" | October 15, 2024 | 0.32 |
| 278 | 4 | "Match Point of No Return" | October 22, 2024 | 0.36 |
| 279 | 5 | "Without a Clue" | October 29, 2024 | 0.32 |
| 280 | 6 | "A Shot of Mess-cal" | November 5, 2024 | 0.28 |
| 281 | 7 | "Dodging Rumors" | November 12, 2024 | 0.36 |
| 282 | 8 | "Birds of a Feather Gossip Together" | November 19, 2024 | 0.41 |
| 283 | 9 | "Coming Clean" | November 26, 2024 | 0.38 |
| 284 | 10 | "A Strictly Ballroom Affair" | December 3, 2024 | 0.38 |
| 285 | 11 | "Resorting to Madness" | December 10, 2024 | 0.39 |
| 286 | 12 | "A Tantrum and a Truce" | December 17, 2024 | 0.39 |
| 287 | 13 | "Dinner Disasters and Breakfast Breakdowns" | January 7, 2025 | 0.47 |
| 288 | 14 | "Quit Your Beachin" | January 14, 2025 | 0.48 |
| 289 | 15 | "Paradise Lost" | January 21, 2025 | 0.51 |
| 290 | 16 | "Reunion Part 1" | January 28, 2025 | 0.52 |
| 291 | 17 | "Reunion Part 2" | February 4, 2025 | 0.51 |
