= Stylish with Jenna Lyons =

American television series

- Genre: Reality television; documentary
- Starring: Jenna Lyons
- Country of origin: United States
- Original language: English

Production
- Executive producers: Simon Lloyd; Jenna Lyons; David Tibballs; Paul Storck; Hillary Olson; Jae Goodman; Michael Bloom
- Production company: Our House Media

Original release
- Network: HBO Max
- Release: December 3, 2020

Stylish with Jenna Lyons is an American reality television series that premiered on HBO Max on December 3, 2020.

== Premise ==
Each episode follows American fashion stylist Jenna Lyons and her team of designers as they tackle design projects ranging from home renovations to launching new fashion brands.

== Episodes ==
No.	Title	Original release date
1	"Episode 1"	December 3, 2020
2	"Episode 2"	December 3, 2020
3	"Episode 3"	December 3, 2020
4	"Episode 4"	December 3, 2020
5	"Episode 5"	December 3, 2020
6	"Episode 6"	December 3, 2020
7	"Episode 7"	December 3, 2020
8	"Episode 8"	December 3, 2020

== Development ==
In October 2018, it was announced that Jenna Lyons had signed a deal with WarnerMedia to develop an unscripted series about her life after resigning as president of J. Crew in 2017. In May 2019, it was announced that the series would be released as The Jenna Lyons Project and premiere on TNT. A teaser for the series was released in September 2020, where it was announced the show would be titled Stylish with Jenna Lyons and premiered exclusively on HBO Max on December 3, 2020.
