= Eric Bolling =

American journalist and political commentator (born 1963)

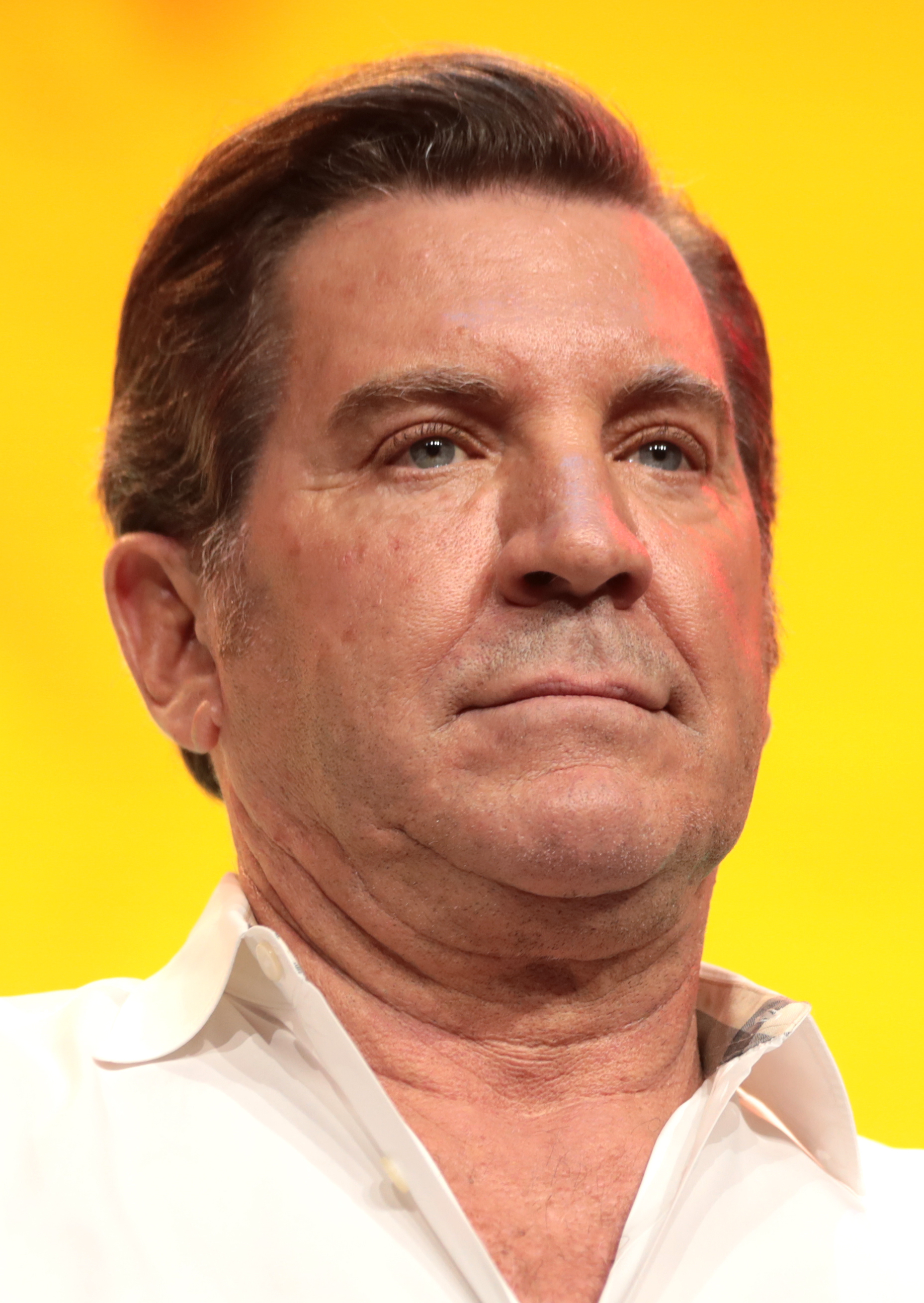
- Bolling in 2020
- Born: Eric Thomas Bolling; March 2, 1963 (age 63); Chicago, Illinois, U.S.
- Education: Rollins College (BA)
- Political party: Republican
- Spouse: Adrienne Bolling
- Children: 1 (deceased)

Eric Thomas Bolling (/ˈboʊlɪŋ/; born March 2, 1963) is an American television personality, conservative political commentator, author, and financial commentator. He has occupied numerous roles as a commentator on financial issues for television, most notably for Fox News. He hosted Fox Business Channel's Cashin' In and Fox News Channel's The Five before leaving in May 2017. A staunch ally of President Donald Trump, Bolling has published two books: Wake Up America (2016) and The Swamp: Washington's Murky Pool of Corruption and Cronyism and How Trump Can Drain It (2017).

In September 2017, Bolling was ousted from Fox News, after the network conducted an independent investigation following an article published by HuffPost reporting that Bolling had sent unsolicited lewd photographs and text messages to three female colleagues. Bolling denied the allegations. He later hosted the television shows America on TheBlaze and America This Week produced by Sinclair Broadcast Group and carried by their stations as a Sunday morning talk show.

Most recently, Bolling hosted a weeknight hour-long program, Eric Bolling The Balance, on Newsmax TV, from July 5, 2021 until May 31, 2024.

== Early life and career ==
Bolling was born in Chicago and attended grade school at Queen of All Saints Basilica school and high school at Loyola Academy. In 1984 he graduated from Rollins College in Winter Park, Florida, with a Bachelor of Arts in economics. He also played college baseball at Rollins. The Pittsburgh Pirates selected Bolling in the 22nd round of the 1984 Major League Baseball draft. His baseball career was cut short by a torn rotator cuff injury.

Bolling worked as a commodities trader on Wall Street. For five years, he was a board member of the New York Mercantile Exchange, later becoming a strategic advisor to the exchange.

== Career as political commentator ==
=== CNBC ===
Bolling was one of several analysts who appeared on CNBC's Fast Money as a panelist.

=== Fox News ===
Bolling joined Fox Business Network in March 2008 as a financial analyst. In 2008, Bolling was named a co-host (joining Cody Willard and Rebecca Diamond) of Happy Hour, a market commentary show in the 5 p.m. time slot. After hosting Fox Business Channel's Follow the Money with Eric Bolling, he became the host of the channel's Cashin' In in 2013, replacing Cheryl Casone. The program ran on Saturdays. Bolling also co-hosted Fox News Channel's The Five.

In June 2011 on the Fox Business Network, Bolling criticized President Barack Obama's decision to meet with Gabon's president, Ali Bongo Ondimba, in the White House. Bolling remarked, "Guess who's coming to dinner? A dictator." He then went on to also criticize Obama for allowing rapper Common to appear in the White House a few weeks before, exclaiming "it's not the first time he's had a hoodlum in the hizzouse." Progressive group Media Matters criticized Bolling, saying "Calling the president of Gabon and Common 'hoods in the hizzy' is not colorful commentary, it is overt racism." Bolling first defended himself on Twitter before later apologizing, saying, "We got a little fast and loose with the language, and we know it's been interpreted as being disrespectful, and for that, I'm sorry." Media Matters also criticized Bolling for his on-air promotion of citizenship conspiracy theories about Barack Obama ("birtherism") and conspiracy theories about the murder of Seth Rich, as well as for his claim in 2011 that "liberal Hollywood was using class warfare" in a Muppets movie "to brainwash our kids" and his claim in 2012 that "Every terrorist on American soil has been a Muslim."

In 2017, Bob Beckel said that Bolling and Roger Ailes saved his life after performing the Heimlich maneuver on him at a restaurant.

While at Fox, Bolling was a guest host on several Fox News opinion shows, such as The O'Reilly Factor, and Fox and Friends.

In April 2017, as part of prime-time lineup changes with Bill O'Reilly's exit, Fox announced that The Five would be moving to the 9 p.m. time slot. Fox News Specialists was created to replace The Five in the 5 p.m. time slot, with Bolling serving as a co-host alongside Katherine Timpf and Eboni Williams. The program premiered on May 1, 2017, but was cancelled when Bolling departed the network.

==== Trump support and political commentary ====
Bolling describes his commentary as "really right wing, hard-core conservative commentaries" and has said, "I think this is what my brand personally is all about." Bolling has been an outspoken and longtime supporter of Donald Trump, vocally supporting him since the launch of his presidential campaign in 2015. Trump and Bolling first met on the set of The Apprentice about ten years before Trump's 2016 presidential campaign; the two were introduced by Mark Burnett, a mutual friend, and went on to develop close ties. In November 2016, after Trump's election but before his inauguration, Bolling was considered by Trump for an appointment in the U.S. Department of Commerce, and the following month, Bolling described himself as "fortunate enough to have a close relationship with the incoming administration." Bolling's promotion to hosting his own show on Fox News, effective at the beginning of May 2017, was seen as a victory for the Trump White House. Bolling interviewed Trump more than six times over his presidency.

==== Sexual harassment allegations and ouster ====
On August 4, 2017, HuffPost reported that several years before and on separate occasions, Bolling allegedly sent unsolicited lewd text messages and lewd photos to three female colleagues at Fox News or Fox Business Network. He was also accused of making "wildly inappropriate" comments to female employees. After the article was published a former Fox News guest alleged that Bolling made numerous unwanted sexual advances towards her.

Bolling denied the allegations against him. The day after the HuffPost article was published, Bolling was suspended from Fox News pending an investigation, which the network commissioned the law firm Paul, Weiss to conduct. A few days after the article was published, Bolling filed a summons and "notice of an intent to file a defamation lawsuit" in New York state court for $50 million against freelance writer Yashar Ali, who wrote the story for HuffPost. Bolling's summons did not specify the statements he contended were defamatory, and he did not bring an actual complaint against Ali. Ali and HuffPost stood by the accuracy of the article; Ali's lawyer, in a letter to Bolling's lawyer, wrote that any lawsuit would be frivolous because Bolling is a public figure, because "Mr. Ali conducted a thorough investigation and verified his information with 14 independent sources," and because "truth is always a defense to defamation."

On September 8, 2017, Bolling departed Fox News. In a statement, the network said that "Eric Bolling and Fox have agreed to part ways amicably." As a result of his departure, Fox News Specialists was canceled by the network.

=== Career after Fox ===
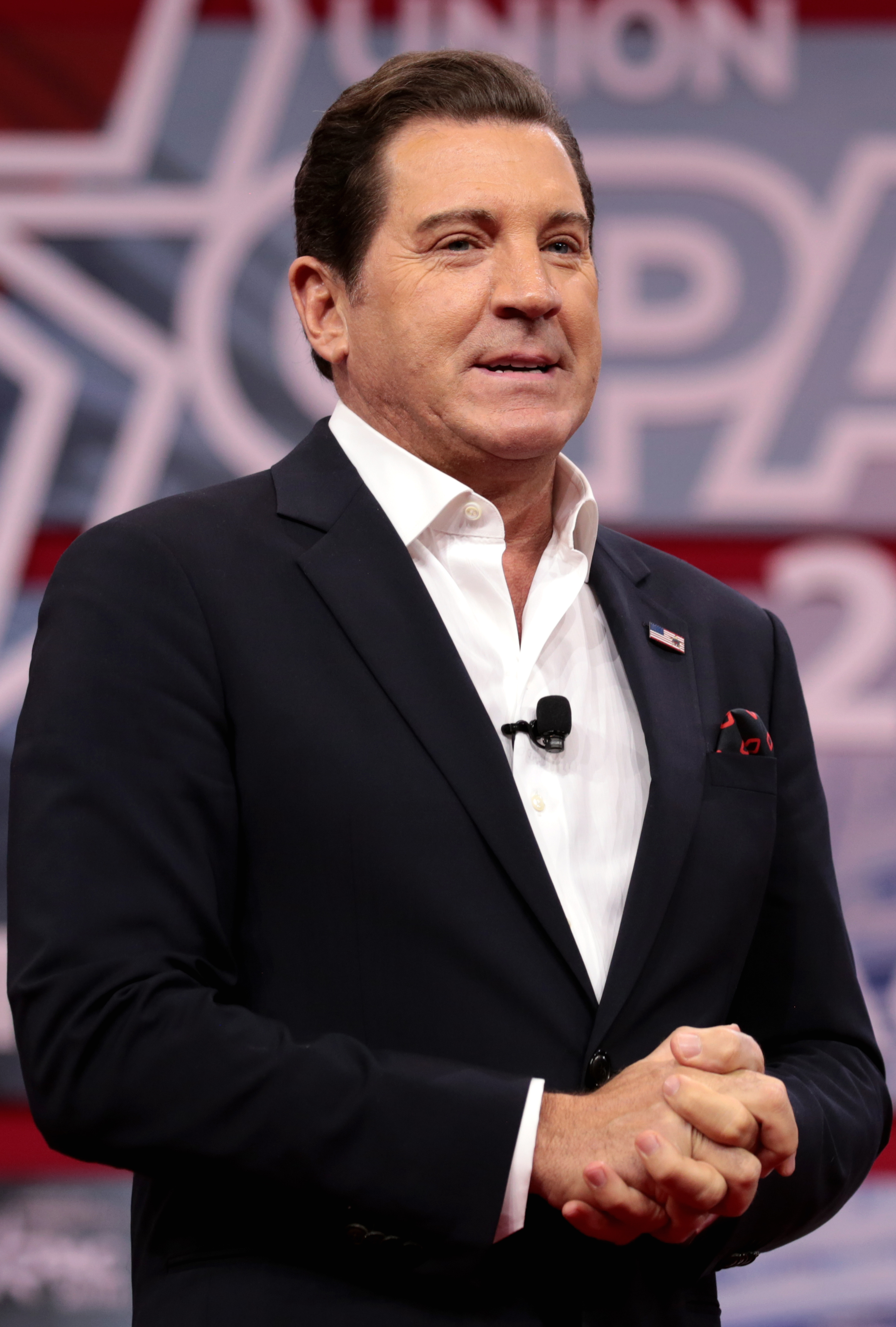
Bolling at CPAC 2018

==== Blaze Media ====
Bolling joined the Conservative Review's CRTV in the summer of 2018. CRTV merged with TheBlaze to form Blaze Media in 2018; in December 2018, Bolling signed an agreement to stay with Blaze Media through 2021. Bolling hosted the television show America on TheBlaze.

==== Sinclair Broadcast Group ====
Bolling began hosting America This Week, which is produced by Sinclair Broadcast Group and carried by their stations as a Sunday morning talk show, in 2019. At Sinclair, Bolling repeatedly promoted Trump's campaign to discredit voting by mail and noted that mail-in voting was prone to fraud.

In 2020, Bolling conducted an interview for America This Week with Judy Mikovits, a researcher featured in the video Plandemic. The video promotes theories regarding the coronavirus pandemic, and suggests that Dr. Anthony Fauci, the U.S. government's chief infectious disease scientist, "manufactured" COVID-19. In the segment, Bolling also interviewed Mikovits's lawyer, Larry Klayman. After the plans to air the segment on local Sinclair stations across the U.S. generated criticism, Sinclair postponed the segment to "rework" it before dropping the segment entirely two days later. Bolling said he did not endorse Mikovits' claims. In January 2021, Sinclair announced the cancellation of the show.

After his Sinclair program was canceled, Bolling launched a podcast co-hosted with former football player Brett Favre.

=== Consideration of Congressional runs ===
In June 2017, Bolling publicly mulled running as a Republican for U.S. Senate after his contract with Fox expired; Bolling opined that some Republicans were insufficiently right wing. In early 2021, Bolling considered a Congressional run in 2022, looking into a possible Republican primary challenge in South Carolina to either Representative Tom Rice (who voted to impeach Trump over his role in the 2021 United States Capitol riot) or Representative Nancy Mace.

== Personal life ==
Bolling lives in Boca Raton, Florida. He is Catholic. He and his wife Adrienne had one son, Eric Chase, who died from an accidental drug overdose at 19 years old, on September 8, 2017. His death occurred on the same day his father departed Fox News.

== Books ==
- Wake Up America: The Nine Virtues That Made Our Nation Great—and Why We Need Them More Than Ever (2016) ISBN 978-1250112507 - Bolling's first book.
- The Swamp: Washington's Murky Pool of Corruption and Cronyism and How Trump Can Drain It (2017) ISBN 978-1250150189
