= Andrea Tantaros =

American political analyst

- Born: Andreana Kostantina Tantaros; December 30, 1978 (age 47); Allentown, Pennsylvania, U.S.
- Education: Parkland High School; Lehigh University
- Occupation: Political analyst
- Television: The Five (Fox News); Outnumbered (Fox News)
- Political party: Republican

Andreana Kostantina Tantaros (born December 30, 1978) is an American conservative political analyst and commentator. She was a co-host of Outnumbered on Fox News from 2014 to 2016 and an original co-host of The Five.

== Early life and education ==
Tantaros was born December 30, 1978, in Allentown, Pennsylvania, where she attended and graduated from Parkland High School in South Whitehall Township, Pennsylvania. Her father is a Greek immigrant, and her mother is of Italian descent. Her family owned the Pied Piper Diner, where she worked.

Tantaros graduated from Lehigh University in Bethlehem, Pennsylvania with a degree in French and journalism, and is also fluent in Greek and Spanish. As she was finishing her degree, she worked as an intern for CNN's Crossfire program, and assisted in covering the Republican National Convention in Philadelphia. Her journal notes during the experience describe her advising herself to "Make yourself invaluable. Ask questions...Be a jack of all trades." She attended the University of Paris, where she earned a master's degree. After returning from Paris in 2003, Tantaros moved to Washington, D.C.

== Career ==
Tantaros worked as a spokeswoman for Massachusetts governor William Weld, then Congressman Pat Toomey, and former National Republican Congressional Committee chairman Thomas Reynolds. In 2005, she moved to New York City and launched Andrea Tantaros Media, which provided crisis management and media strategy consulting to Fortune 500 companies and political campaigns.

=== Fox News ===
In April 2010, Tantaros joined Fox News as a political contributor. In 2011, she was named a co-host of The Five. Several months after its launch, The Five's audience exceeded that of competitors MSNBC and CNN combined. By 2013, The Five was the second-most watched program on United States cable news.

In 2014, Tantaros went on to co-host Outnumbered on Fox News. In December 2014, in response to a U.S. Senate Intelligence Committee report on CIA torture programs, Tantaros said on Outnumbered, "The United States of America is awesome. We are awesome, but we've had this discussion ... about torture." "The reason they want to have this discussion is not to show how awesome we are ... this administration wants to have this discussion to show us how we're not awesome." This is because "they apologized for this country, they don't like this country, they want us to look bad. And all this does is have our enemies laughing at us, that we are having this debate again."

==== Sexual harassment complaints and departure ====
Tantaros filed formal complaints of sexual harassment against Fox News personnel. On April 25, 2016, she was pulled from the show for what Fox News said were "contract issues". In August 2016, Tantaros filed a lawsuit claiming that she approached Fox News executives about Roger Ailes sexually harassing her in 2015. She said that her allegations resulted first in her being demoted from The Five to Outnumbered, and then in her being taken off the air in April 2016. The lawsuit also claimed that Bill O'Reilly, Dean Cain, and Scott Brown made inappropriate comments to her, and that Brown and Cain touched her without her consent. Brown, Cain, and O'Reilly all denied her allegations. Her amended complaint, filed on January 29, 2018, contained details intended to back up her claims of a culture of harassment, including spying on employees, at the network. However, that complaint, too, was rejected; on May 18, 2018, Judge George B. Daniels threw the case out, citing lack of "factual support." Without any formal legal training, Tantaros represented herself in the case after having gone through three lawyers.

=== Book ===
In 2016, she authored Tied Up in Knots: How Getting What We Wanted Made Women Miserable, published by Broadside Books (ISBN 978-0062351869). Later that year, in October 2016, Tantaros' editor Michael Malice sued her under his original name Michael Krechmer, claiming that he was the ghostwriter of the book, and Tantaros did not pay him the full amount to which they agreed. Tantaros responded that she wrote the book herself, and her attorney at the time said, "We have good reason to believe Fox News is behind this case." Tantaros said that Malice fed information about her and the book to Fox News in violation of her confidentiality agreement with him as her editor. The lawsuit was dismissed. Malice appealed the dismissal and lost.
