= Rebecca Minkoff (company) =

American fashion brand

Rebecca Minkoff LLC
- Type: Private
- Industry: Fashion
- Founded: 2005
- Founder: Rebecca Minkoff
- Headquarters: New York City, U.S.
- Number of locations: 13
- Area served: Worldwide
- Key people: Rebecca Minkoff, Uri Minkoff
- Products: Handbags
- Website: https://www.rebeccaminkoff.com

Rebecca Minkoff is an American fashion brand that was founded by brother and sister Rebecca Minkoff and Uri Minkoff in 2005 in New York City. The brand has retail stores in New York, San Francisco, Los Angeles, Hong Kong, Tokyo, and Korea, and is distributed in over 900 stores worldwide. The Rebecca Minkoff brand carries a range of apparel including handbags, footwear, jewellery and accessories.

In 2026, Republic Brands Group acquired Rebecca Minkoff, intending to expand global licensing partnerships, brand collaborations and retail distribution.

== History ==
In 2001, Rebecca Minkoff began working on her own fashion designs. Her first national recognition came when actress Jenna Elfman wore a Minkoff-designed "I Love New York" T-shirt on The Tonight Show with Jay Leno. In 2005, Rebecca Minkoff incorporated the company and co-founded the brand with her brother Uri Minkoff, who had founded a small handful of health-care and technology startups, joined her, and they officially launched Rebecca Minkoff LLC. Since the launch, the Rebecca Minkoff brand has seen been distributed in over 900 stores worldwide and has received several awards, including the Breakthrough Designer Award at the Accessories Council Excellence Awards, announced as a member of the first-ever New York State Council on Women and Girls, and has been an active member of the Council of Fashion Designers of America. The brand has since brought their retail store concept to Chicago, and has a store targeting the next-gen shopper on Melrose Avenue in Los Angeles.

In 2018, Rebecca Minkoff announced they would no longer be presenting at New York Fashion Week, but instead chose to focus efforts on a new project that launched in tandem with the 2018 Women's March, RM Superwomen. RM Superwomen is a social space with a single goal: to encourage women around the world to be brave and courageous. The platform will highlight activists like the Women's March leaders, and will be a place for conversation and events that will hopefully inspire women to lead "fearless" lives. To kick off the new social space, Minkoff has partnered with The Women's March, launching a campaign to highlight their voices along with other key activists and influencers like actress Zosia Mamet and journalist Gretchen Carlson.

== Personal life ==
Rebecca Minkoff has been a life-long member of the Church of Scientology. She was raised both Jewish and in the Church of Scientology.

In 2024, Rebecca Minkoff joined The Real Housewives of New York City for its fifteenth season as a friend of the housewives. In 2025, Minkoff exited the series after one season.

== Awards ==
- 2009 New York Moves Power Women
- 2010 Member, The Council of Fashion Designers of America
- 2011 Breakthrough Designer Award from the Accessories Council
- 2013 Finalist of Ernst & Young Entrepreneur of the Year Award
- 2015 Best Interactive Retail & Top Innovator at the Fashion 2.0 Awards
