= Racquel Chevremont =

American art curator, art collector, and model

- Chevremont in 2026
- Born: June 25, 1971 (age 55); Brooklyn, New York
- Known for: Art curation and collection
- Notable work: This Too Shall Pass (2023), Set It Off (2022), Brand New Heavies (2021)
- Spouse: Corey MacArthur Baylor (m. 2004; div. 2013)
- Partners: Mickalene Thomas (2011-2020); Melissa Corpus (2022-present)
- Children: 2
- Website: https://racquelchevremont.com/

Racquel Chevremont (born June 25, 1971) is an American curator, art collector, advisor, model, and television personality. Chevremont is best known for her contemporary art curation, which has been shown in both gallery and institutional exhibitions as well as in popular media and culture, and for starring in the fifteenth season of The Real Housewives of New York City.

== Early life ==
Chevremont was born in Brooklyn, New York in 1971, and raised in Castle Hill, Bronx by a single mom. She grew up in a multicultural household and cites her mother as an inspiration for entering the art world and supporting underrepresented artists; Chevremont's mother had aspired to be an artist but did not realize a viable way to pursue art as a career.

== Career ==
Chevremont began her career as a model when she was discovered by photographer and model scout Steve Landis in 1991, a meeting that led to a decades-long career in modeling that placed Chevremont on international magazine covers as well as ads for Benetton, Bobbi Brown Cosmetics, Fila, L’Oréal, Nivea and Elle, among others. Chevremont continues to model, most recently in fall 2024 in a runway show at New York Fashion Week curated by fashion designer Batsheva Hay.

Chevremont entered the art world as a collector, buying the works of underrepresented artists in Europe and the United States. In 2003, she joined the acquisitions committees of the Solomon R. Guggenheim Museum and the Studio Museum in Harlem. She made her curatorial debut in 2016, when she curated the artwork for the television series Empire, followed in 2018, by co-curating the VOLTA NY Curated Section, titled The Aesthetics of Matter, which featured paintings, sculpture, photography, video, and print across a 2,600-square-foot space.

In 2021, Chevremont co-curated Brand New Heavies, a group exhibition at Pioneer Works New York featuring new and site-specific installations by Abigail DeVille, Xaviera Simmons, and Rosa-Johan Uddoh, sponsored by the Ford Foundation and Gucci. That same year, she co-curated another group exhibition, Mining the Archive at Yancey Richardson Gallery, focusing on new photo collage work by nine artists, among them Lyle Ashton Harris, Leslie Hewitt, Wardell Milan, and Deborah Roberts. A year later, in 2022, she also co-curated the group exhibition Set It Off at Parrish Museum, in Water Mill, New York.

In 2023, Chevremont curated This Too Shall Pass at Venus over Manhattan, an exhibition focusing on the ephemerality of floral motifs and the concepts of impermanence, transience, change, and personal memory. Featured artists included Alex Anderson, Leilah Babirye, Coady Brown, Marc Dennis, Melissa Joseph, Natia Lemay, Diana Sofia Lozano, Maia Cruz Palileo, Charles Mason III, Ferrari Sheppard, and Shinique Smith.

For three consecutive years in 2022, 2023, and 2024, Chevremont was selected as the curator for the Artist Awards of the Tribeca Festival (formerly the Tribeca Film Festival), a program sponsored by CHANEL that presents pieces of art by both established and emerging artists as awards to winning filmmakers. The 2024 exhibition included work by artists such as Glenn Ligon, Jenny Holzer, and José Parlá.

Chevremont has also curated art collections for numerous television series and feature films, including Leave the World Behind, And Just Like That..., Severance, and First Wives Club.

On June 27, 2024, Bravo announced that Chevremont would be joining the cast of the fifteenth season of The Real Housewives of New York City, becoming the second LGBT+ cast member in the show's history.

== Personal life ==
Chevremont is openly lesbian and is engaged to Columbia graduate and forensic neuropsychologist Melissa Corpus. She is a mother to two children, Corey and Elle Baylor.
