= Ubah Hassan =

Somali-Canadian model (born 1983)

- اوبح حسن
- Born: Ubah Ali Hassan; 27 August 1983 (age 43); Somalia
- Occupations: Model; businesswoman; television personality
- Partner(s): Oliver Dachsel (2022–present; engaged)
- Relatives: Chanel Ayan (cousin)
- Modeling information
- Height: 5 ft 11.5 in (1.82 m)
- Hair color: Black
- Eye color: Brown
- Agency: Richard's International Model Management (Vancouver); Models 1 (London)

Ubah Ali Hassan (Somali: Ubax Xasan, Arabic: اوبح حسن; born 27 August 1983) is a Somali-Canadian model, businesswoman, and television personality. She has worked with a number of top designers including Ralph Lauren, Gucci, Rachel Roy, and Oscar de la Renta. She is the founder and CEO of Ubah Hot, her own personal brand of hot sauce. Hassan is also known for starring in the Bravo reality series The Real Housewives of New York City for seasons fourteen and fifteen. In addition, she is involved in philanthropic work.

== Early life ==
Hassan was born in Somalia in 1983 and grew up in the city of Baidoa. In 1991, Hassan's mother and three sisters fled war-torn Somalia and moved to Ethiopia. Hassan, her father, and her brother stayed in Somalia until 1994 when they then moved to Kenya. Hassan later immigrated to Canada at the age of 15, where she was reunited with her mother and sisters who had also immigrated to the country. Hassan's family lived in a homeless shelter for a year upon their move to Canada.

== Career ==
At age 17, Hassan was talent spotted at a park in Canada by a photographer and subsequently began modeling in Vancouver and Toronto. She was also the owner of a restaurant while living in Vancouver. In 2007, she was signed to Click Model Management in New York City. There she began doing high-profile photoshoots and walking fashion runways.

In April 2008, Hassan was featured in an Allure magazine editorial spread. In May of that same year, Hassan was named Model.com's Model of the Week. She has appeared in Vogue Italia twice, first in July 2008's Black issue where she was photographed by Steven Meisel, and then again in January 2009's Soul Kitchen issue where she was photographed by Bruce Weber. She was the face of Ralph Lauren's Spring/Summer 2009 campaign. Hassan has also done work with several other top designers, brands, and companies including Oscar de la Renta, Rachel Roy, Betsey Johnson, Malan Breton, Gucci, Lucky Brand Jeans, CoverGirl, Polaroid, and Macy's. As of 2023, Hassan is still signed to Richard's International Model Management in Vancouver, her mother agency, and Models 1 in London.

In March 2015, Hassan was the subject of a documentary short film titled Ubah! that was directed by Joe Berlinger and premiered on CNN.com. In the short film, Hassan discusses her upbringing in Somalia, career in modeling, and philanthropic efforts in Cambodia.

Hassan is the founder and CEO of Ubah Hot, an African-inspired vegan hot sauce brand. The hot sauce became available to purchase in June 2021 and was featured as one of Oprah's Favorite Things in November of that same year. She appeared in the seventh episode of the first season of the Netflix reality series My Unorthodox Life, where she discussed her hot sauce brand with the show's star Julia Haart. In 2023, Hassan collaborated with Serafina, an Italian restaurant chain based in New York City, to create a specialty pizza named Ubah Hot Pizza.

In October 2022, it was announced that Hassan was joining the cast of The Real Housewives of New York City. The fourteenth season of the series, Hassan's first, premiered on July 16, 2023. In March 2026, it was revealed Hassan departed the show after the fifteenth season when the series announced its sixteenth-season cast.

== Philanthropy and activism ==
Hassan is involved with various philanthropic efforts. She is an Oxfam Sisters on the Planet ambassador. The goal of the organization is to end systemic discrimination against women by changing laws and policies that keep women in poverty. In 2012, Hassan partnered with Oxfam to create Maji Umbrellas. The company, which Hassan was the president and co-founder of, sold umbrellas and donated a portion of the profits to clean water initiatives in East Africa. Hassan was later the recipient of an Elle magazine Genius Award for her work with Maji Umbrellas.

Hassan is an outspoken advocate of diversity in the modeling industry, and has encouraged companies to hire models of all races, ages, and body types. In 2009, Hassan was interviewed by Somali model Iman for New York Magazine and discussed her experiences as a Black woman working in modeling.

She works closely with footwear brand Toms Shoes' global charity and has traveled to Cambodia to give shoes and other essentials to people in need. In the documentary short film Ubah!, Hassan is shown raising money for the Cambodian Children's Fund. She talked about feeling compelled to act and help the children there after her trip to the country. Hassan also works with All Hands and Hearts, a nonprofit organization benefiting those impacted by natural disasters.

In June 2023, Hassan was honored by the Gabrielle's Angel Foundation for Cancer Research for her efforts raising awareness and funds for cancer research. She said she was motivated to join the cause after her mother died from leukemia in 2012.

Hassan has modeled several times for Talbots and Dress for Success' yearly collaborative philanthropic campaign, which raises money benefiting unemployed and underemployed women around the world.

== Personal life ==
Hassan is a Muslim. She is a cousin of fellow model Chanel Ayan, who was one of the stars of The Real Housewives of Dubai. Hassan is currently engaged to investment banker Oliver Dachsel, whom she began dating in 2022. She is an avid traveler and has said traveling is one of her favorite activities. Hassan has named Oprah Winfrey, Muhammad Ali, Naomi Campbell, and Iman as being some of her inspirations and influences.
