= The Real Housewives of New York City season 13 =

Television season

The Real Housewives of New York City
- Season 13
- Cover used by the iTunes Store
- Starring: Luann de Lesseps; Ramona Singer; Sonja Morgan; Leah McSweeney; Eboni K. Williams
- No. of episodes: 18

Release
- Original network: Bravo
- Original release: May 4 – September 7, 2021

Season chronology
- ← Previous; Season 12 Next → Season 14

The thirteenth season of The Real Housewives of New York City, an American reality television series, is broadcast on Bravo. It premiered on May 4, 2021. The series is primarily filmed in New York City. Its executive producers are Lisa Shannon, Barrie Bernstein, Darren Ward, John Paparazzo, and Andy Cohen. The season focuses on the lives of Luann de Lesseps, Ramona Singer, Sonja Morgan, Leah McSweeney and Eboni K. Williams.

Following a very poorly received season, it was announced in September 2021 that a reunion for the season would not take place. This marked the first time in the history of The Real Housewives franchise that a US series was not followed up with a reunion special. Bravo stated "Due to scheduling challenges around taping the reunion of 'The Real Housewives of New York City' in a timely manner. It's disappointing to not be able to bring the cast back together, but we are happy to have ended on such a high note with the finale, and are now shifting our focus to next season."

This marked the final appearances of Luann de Lesseps, Ramona Singer, Sonja Morgan and Leah McSweeney. The season also marked the only appearance of Eboni K. Williams.

== Cast and synopsis ==
In June 2020, Tinsley Mortimer announced her departure from the series and her relocation to Chicago to continue her relationship with her fiancé, Scott Kluth. In August 2020, Dorinda Medley announced her departure from the series and two months later revealed that she was fired from the series.

Bershan Shaw and former housewife, Heather Thomson, come onto the series as friends of the housewives.

In October 2020, production on the series halted after a crew member tested positive for COVID-19. In January 2021, it was announced production on the series had halted again after an undisclosed cast member had tested positive for the virus.

== Episodes ==
The Real Housewives of New York City season 13 episodes
| No. overall | No. in season | Title | Original release date | U.S. viewers (millions) |
|---|---|---|---|---|
| 241 | 1 | "Back in the Big Apple" | May 4, 2021 | 0.96 |
| 242 | 2 | "Burning Up" | May 11, 2021 | 0.87 |
| 243 | 3 | "A High Rate of Interest" | May 18, 2021 | 0.82 |
| 244 | 4 | "Putting the Tiff in Tiffany's" | May 25, 2021 | 0.84 |
| 245 | 5 | "How Nude" | June 1, 2021 | 0.88 |
| 246 | 6 | "Stop and Throw the Roses" | June 8, 2021 | 0.88 |
| 247 | 7 | "Electile Dysfunction" | June 15, 2021 | 0.87 |
| 248 | 8 | "A Harlem Night" | June 29, 2021 | 0.76 |
| 249 | 9 | "The Salem B... Trials" | July 6, 2021 | 0.86 |
| 250 | 10 | "Light as a Feather, Stiff as a Bored" | July 13, 2021 | 0.72 |
| 251 | 11 | "The Witching Hour" | July 20, 2021 | 0.88 |
| 252 | 12 | "Baby It’s Cold Inside" | July 27, 2021 | 0.81 |
| 253 | 13 | "Ho Ho Holidays" | August 3, 2021 | 0.82 |
| 254 | 14 | "Hanger Pains" | August 10, 2021 | 0.81 |
| 255 | 15 | "B...ing and Ramoaning" | August 17, 2021 | 0.83 |
| 256 | 16 | "Be Mine, Galentine" | August 24, 2021 | 0.75 |
| 257 | 17 | "The Doppelgang's All Here" | August 31, 2021 | 0.84 |
| 258 | 18 | "So...That Happened" | September 7, 2021 | 0.54 |
