= Bob Beckel =

American political analyst (1948–2022)

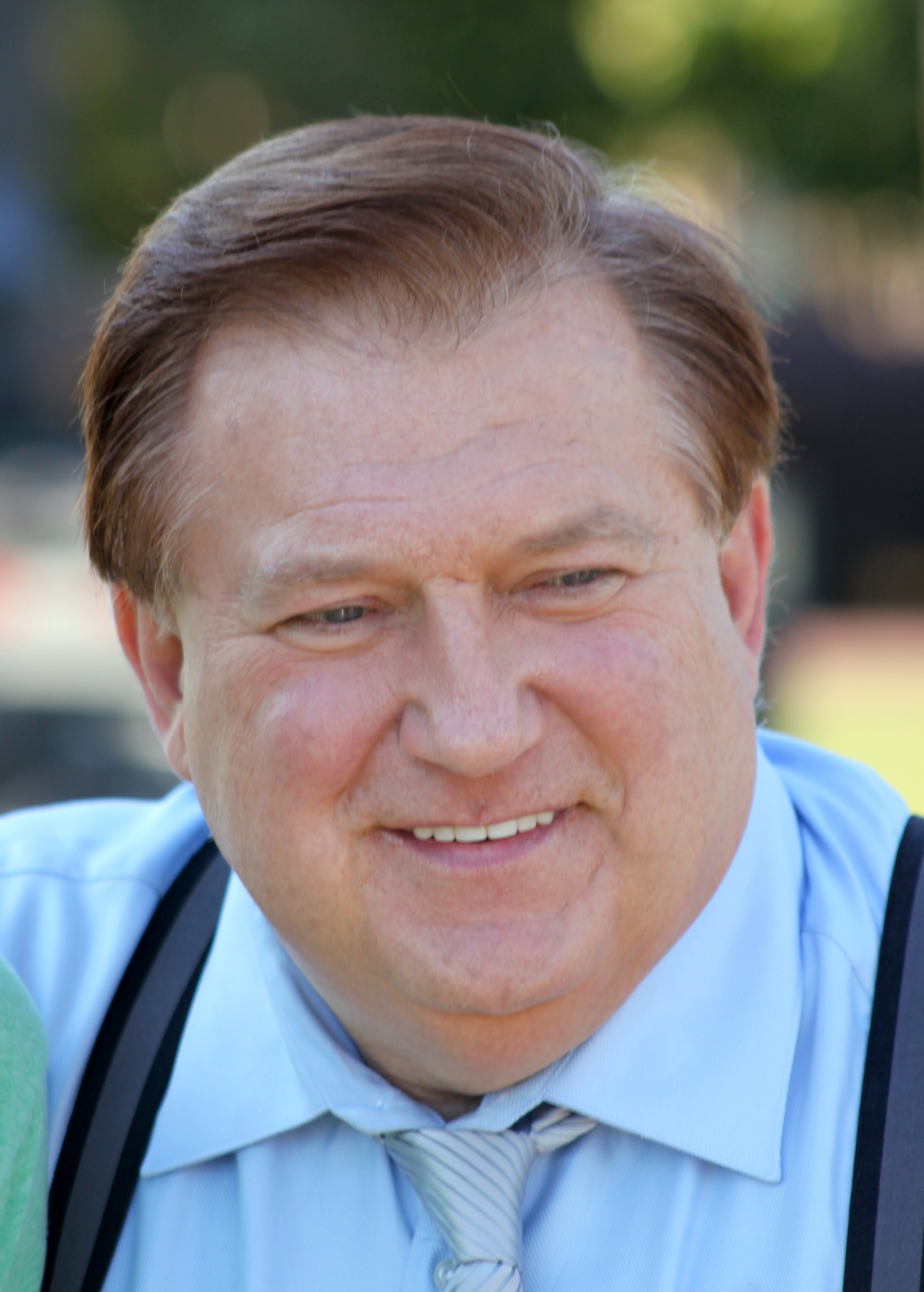
- Beckel in 2011
- Born: Robert Gilliland Beckel; November 15, 1948; New York City, U.S.
- Died: February 20, 2022 (aged 73); Silver Spring, Maryland, U.S.
- Education: Lyme-Old Lyme High School, Wagner College (BA 1970)
- Occupations: Political commentator; columnist; political advisor; government official
- Political party: Democratic
- Spouse: Leland Ingham (m. 1992; div. 2002)
- Children: 2
- Relatives: Graham Beckel (brother)

Robert Gilliland Beckel (November 15, 1948 – February 20, 2022) was an American political analyst and pundit, and political operative. He was a registered Democrat, and from 2011 until 2015 an analyst and commentator on Fox News. He was an original co-host of The Five until he was released in 2015 after being absent for several months recovering from back surgery. Briefly, Beckel became a commentator for CNN, but returned to Fox News as co-host of The Five on January 16, 2017. On May 19, 2017, Fox News announced Beckel had been fired again after he was accused of making a racist remark to a Fox News employee.

== Early life ==
Beckel was born in Greenwich Village, Manhattan and grew up in Lyme, Connecticut, where he attended Lyme-Old Lyme High School. He is the son of and Ellen (née Gilliland; 1916–1999) and Cambridge Graham Beckel Jr. (1913–2002), author of Workshops for the World: The United Nations Family of Agencies. He grew up with his younger brother, actor Graham Beckel, and older sister, Margaret Somerville Beckel.

Beckel received a BA from Wagner College in Staten Island. While in college, he played football and was a brother of Theta Chi fraternity. and worked for Robert F. Kennedy's presidential campaign in 1968.

After college, Beckel served in the Philippines as a Peace Corps volunteer from 1971 to 1972, and later was a graduate school professor of politics at George Washington University.

== Career ==
=== Carter administration ===
In 1977, Beckel joined the United States Department of State as deputy assistant secretary of state for congressional relations, becoming the youngest deputy assistant secretary of state in the Carter administration. In that role he helped to shepherd the Panama Canal Treaty through Congress to ratification. The following year he was appointed special assistant to the president for legislative affairs, working on ratification of Salt II and Mideast treaties.

=== Political campaigns for the Democratic Party and consulting ===
Beckel was the campaign manager for Walter Mondale's 1984 presidential campaign. During that campaign he became known as the man who effectively wrapped the Wendy's slogan "Where's the beef?" around Gary Hart, Mondale's opponent for the Democratic nomination.

In late 1984 he formed the consulting firm Bob Beckel & Associates, or BBA, a lobbying firm that was succeeded in 1985 by Beckel–Cowan. In 2000 Beckel called on Florida electors to overturn George W. Bush's slim victory over Al Gore. Gore rejected this, and Beckel's business partners left his firm over the move, forcing him to dissolve it.

In 2002 Beckel managed the campaign of Alan Blinken, the Democratic nominee for United States Senate in Idaho, until he resigned after it became public that he was a witness and victim in an extortion attempt by a prostitute.

=== USA Today ===
From 2005 until the end of 2015, Beckel was a columnist for USA Today, where he wrote articles with friend and political opposite Cal Thomas in the style of "point–counterpoint." Beckel and Thomas debated issues such as Immigration and the Iraq War.

=== Fox News, 2011–2015 ===
In 2010, he made a brief appearance as himself on the Season 8 premiere of TV series 24 in a mock debate with fellow Fox News Analyst Monica Crowley.

In 2011, Beckel joined Fox News as a co-host of The Five and co-hosted some 708 episodes, In December 2011 Beckel said about Julian Assange on Fox: "A dead man can't leak stuff ... there's only one way to do it: illegally shoot the son of a bitch."

In October 2011, Beckel nearly choked to death on a piece of shrimp at a Fox News reception, but was saved by Fox News chief Roger Ailes and The Five co-host Eric Bolling.

During his time on The Five, Beckel frequently made comments which attracted criticism. On a Fox News panel in 2011, Beckel called for "illegally shoot[ing]" Julian Assange, the editor of WikiLeaks. In February 2013 Beckel said "When's the last time you heard about rape on a college campus?". After receiving criticism for his comments he apologized. In July 2014, Beckel referred to Chinese citizens as "chinamen" and in the same month he referred to The Bachelorette star Andi Dorfman as a "slut". In June 2015, Fox announced that Beckel had left the program. A Fox spokesman said: "We couldn't hold The Five hostage to one man's personal issues." Beckel, whose last appearance on the show was in February 2015, had been absent while recovering from back surgery; he had also drawn controversy a month prior to his departure from the show, when he described himself as an "Islamophobe" in response to the Charlie Hebdo shooting. The network issued a statement, saying that Beckel had "entered rehab facility for treatment of an addiction to prescription pain medication."

On January 16, 2017, Beckel rejoined The Five as co-host. However, he was again fired in May of that same year, amid claims that he had made racially insensitive remarks to a Black employee. After being fired from Fox, Beckel criticized Fox for "using political tactics to front for Trump", specifically singling out Tucker Carlson.

=== CNN ===
In October 2015, Beckel was hired by CNN to offer commentary on the 2016 election. CNN was criticized for hiring Beckel due to his controversial views on Muslims.

In response to Hillary Clinton calling Donald Trump supporters a "basket of deplorables", Beckel responded: "It's the wrong thing to say". On an episode of Don Lemon Tonight, Beckel questioned former Trump campaign manager Corey Lewandowski's unwillingness to criticize Trump. After the release of the Access Hollywood tape, Beckel predicted that Trump would lose the 2016 presidential election.

In February 2016, Beckel told CNN about an alleged letter that Trump had written to Diana, Princess of Wales, claiming the information would be damaging. Beckel said he sought out the letter.

=== Political views ===
Beckel was a registered Democrat. Beckel supported single-payer healthcare, Campaign finance reform, same-sex marriage, and banning handguns.

Beckel was originally pro-choice but his views on abortion changed after he read the Bible. Beckel was described as having anti-Muslim views when proposing to temporarily prohibit foreign Muslim students from entering the country in response to the Boston bombing. Beckel was a Christian and credited God with saving him from drug addiction and alcoholism.

== Personal life ==
In 1992, Beckel married Leland Ingham. They had two children and divorced in 2002.

Beckel was a recovering alcoholic. He spoke openly about his past addictions to drugs and alcohol, admitting in July 2011 on The Five: "I'm a recovering addict and cocaine was my drug of choice." Both of Beckel's parents were alcoholics.

In 2007, Beckel said that he was involved in an altercation in a Bethesda, Maryland, grocery store parking lot with a man who took issue with his anti–George W. Bush bumper stickers.

In early 2015, Beckel was absent from The Five for a number of weeks, which led to speculation that he had been fired. Fox later announced that his absence was due to "health-related issues." It was later revealed that he had major back surgery on March 26 at a New York–area hospital.

Beckel was saved later in life, in accordance with Protestant Christian doctrine.

In late 2015, Beckel published a memoir, I Should Be Dead: My Life Surviving Politics, TV, and Addiction, co-written with John David Mann. Cal Thomas hosted a book-signing party celebrating publication of the book, which aired in November 2015 on C-SPAN.

=== Death ===
Beckel died at his home in Silver Spring, Maryland, on February 20, 2022, at the age of 73. Friends and colleagues paid tribute to Beckel including Sean Hannity, Laura Ingraham, and Cal Thomas.

== Bibliography ==
- Thomas, Cal; Beckel, Bob (2007). Common Ground: How to Stop the Partisan War That Is Destroying America (1st ed.). New York: William Morrow. ISBN 978-0-06-123634-1. LCCN 2008541878. OCLC 166295043.
- Beckel, Bob; Mann, John David (2015). I Should Be Dead: My Life Surviving Politics, TV, and Addiction. New York City: Hachette Books. ISBN 978-0-31-634775-4.
