= Fox News Specialists =

2017 American TV news program

- Genre: Current affairs program
- Presented by: Eric Bolling; Eboni K. Williams; Kat Timpf
- Country of origin: United States
- Original language: English

Production
- Production locations: New York City, New York
- Camera setup: Multi-camera
- Running time: 60 minutes

Original release
- Network: Fox News
- Release: May 1 – September 7, 2017

Fox News Specialists is an American news and talk show that aired from May 1 to September 7, 2017, on the Fox News channel. It featured three permanent hosts, Eric Bolling, Kat Timpf, and Eboni K. Williams, plus two rotating guests, who are called specialists, who discuss current events and political issues. It was created to replace The Five, that Bolling used to be a co-host for, due to that show moving to 9 pm ET, in the wake of Bill O'Reilly being forced out at Fox News. The first two guest co-hosts for the first episode were Dallas Mavericks owner Mark Cuban and television producer Mark McKinnon. The first episode also featured an interview, conducted by Bolling, with President Donald Trump. A special edition aired on July 11, 2017, at 11:00 pm ET following an exclusive interview with Donald Trump Jr. on Hannity.

In August, Fox News suspended Eric Bolling, owing to allegations of sexual misconduct. For about a month afterward, a string of guest hosts, most of them Fox News contributors, sat in for Bolling. Upon Bolling's ultimate departure from FNC in September, the network canceled Fox News Specialists. In its place, The Five returned to its initial 5 p.m. time slot.

== Citations ==
Preceded by Your World with Neil Cavuto	Fox News Channel Weekday lineup 5:00 PM – 6:00 PM	Succeeded by Special Report with Bret Baier
