= The O'Reilly Factor =

American cable television news and talk show (1996–2017)

- Also known as: The O'Reilly Report(1996–1998); The Factor (2017)
- Genre: Talk show
- Created by: Bill O'Reilly
- Presented by: Bill O'Reilly
- Theme music composer: Scott Schreer
- Country of origin: United States
- Original language: English
- No. of seasons: 21

Production
- Camera setup: Multi-camera
- Running time: 60 minutes
- Production company: Fox News

Original release
- Network: Fox News
- Release: October 7, 1996 – April 21, 2017

The O'Reilly Factor (originally titled The O'Reilly Report and also known as The Factor) is an American cable television news and talk show. The O'Reilly Factor first aired in the United States on Fox News Channel on October 7, 1996, the same day the network launched. It was hosted by independent commentator Bill O'Reilly, who discussed current events and controversial political issues with guests. The final episode aired on April 21, 2017.

== Format ==
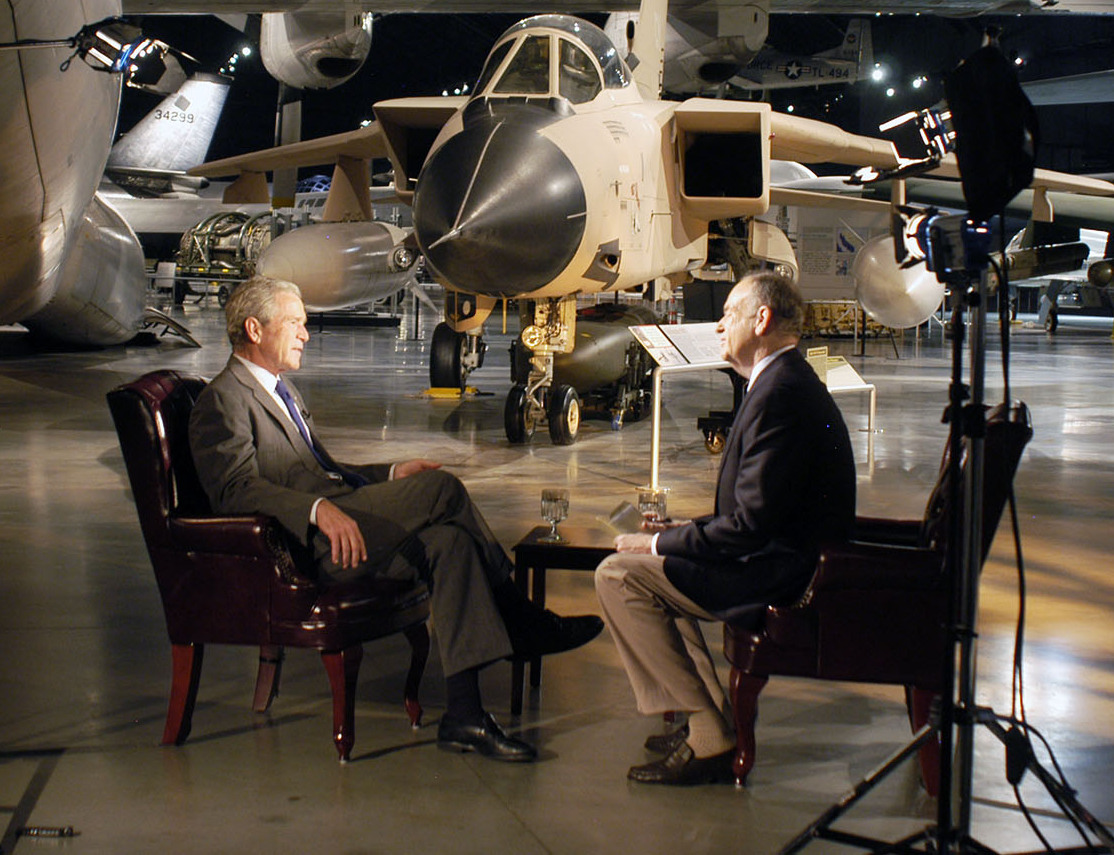
Bill O'Reilly interviews former President George W. Bush for The O’Reilly Factor at the Air Force Museum, November 11, 2010

The O'Reilly Factor was generally pre-recorded, though on occasion it aired live if breaking news or special events were being covered (e.g., presidential addresses that occurred during prime-time and debate coverage). It was usually taped between 5:00 p.m. and 7:00 p.m. Eastern Time and aired weekdays at 8:00 p.m. and 11:00 p.m. The show was recorded "live to tape,” meaning that the recording broke for commercials as if the show was actually on the air while being recorded. Some guests were interviewed before the "live to tape" period and were slotted in the program as appropriate. He began every show with the catchphrase from late 2003 to April 11, 2017, "Caution! You are about to enter the No Spin Zone. The Factor begins right now!" followed by the theme song, and then saying "Hi, I'm Bill O'Reilly, thanks for watching us tonight," introducing the topic of the first segment, followed by "and that is the subject of this evening's Talking Points Memo,” a monologue which was often followed with an interview on the same topic.

O'Reilly and his producers discussed potential topics twice a week. Guest hosts included: Eric Bolling, Monica Crowley, Greg Gutfeld, E. D. Hill, Laura Ingraham, John Kasich, Michelle Malkin, Tony Snow, and Juan Williams.

== Audience ==
Early in 2009, the show's ratings increased. In July 2009, Hal Boedeker blogged that The O'Reilly Factor peaked at 3.1 million viewers which was an increase of 37% from the previous year. In September 2009, The O'Reilly Factor was the #1 cable news show for 106 consecutive weeks. In May 2014, The O'Reilly Factor still held this top position, but average monthly viewers were down to 2.1 million, with a median age of 72 years. In March 2015, The O'Reilly Factor remained at the number one spot on cable news ratings for its 60th consecutive quarter, experiencing 19% growth in viewership among individuals aged 25 to 54 years old.

Ratings were initially high after sexual harassment allegations against O'Reilly resurfaced in April 2017. In the time during Bill O'Reilly's week-long vacation preceding his firing (in which Dana Perino guest hosted), the ratings dropped 26%.

== Notable guests ==
Michelle Malkin was a frequent guest host. A conservative commentator, she began boycotting the show in 2007 due to controversy involving remarks made against her by Geraldo Rivera over her position on illegal immigration.

2008 presidential contenders

Fox News producers had tried for years to get Hillary Clinton to come on the show. On April 30, 2008, Clinton agreed to come on the show as part of a pre-taped interview that would be broadcast over two days. The host also held an exclusive, four-part interview with then-presidential candidate Barack Obama. Both interviews drew significant media attention as they were front runners for the 2008 presidential election. In the same election cycle, Ron Paul and O'Reilly got into a testy exchange over the issue of Iran. The 2008 Republican candidate for vice president, Sarah Palin, and then Democratic vice presidential candidate Joe Biden were also invited to the show, but chose not to make an appearance.

== Cultural impact ==
In 2005, The Colbert Report premiered on Comedy Central. The show, hosted by Stephen Colbert, was a satirical spoof of pundit shows like The O'Reilly Factor, spoofing its format and the mannerisms and ideology of O'Reilly, whom Colbert called "Papa Bear." Colbert made no secret of his spoofing O'Reilly: upon hearing the news that O'Reilly approved of The Colbert Report, he declared on-air that "I like you too. In fact, if it wasn't for you, this show wouldn't exist." On January 18, 2007, Colbert appeared on The O'Reilly Factor and O'Reilly appeared on The Colbert Report. After O'Reilly left his show, the character Colbert played on The Colbert Report appeared "via satellite" on his new show, The Late Show with Stephen Colbert, to bid a satirical farewell to Bill.

The O'Reilly Factor has also been spoofed on Saturday Night Live, first by Jeff Richards and later on by Darrell Hammond, and then with Alec Baldwin, where Baldwin played both O'Reilly and Donald Trump in the same sketch in an interview segment. On MADtv, the parody was by Michael McDonald. O'Reilly himself has appeared on MADtv. Richards also played O'Reilly in an episode of Mind of Mencia where O'Reilly is a senator in the year 2016. The show was also spoofed by the TV series The Boondocks, first in the episode "The Trial of R. Kelly" where O'Reilly is shown talking about R. Kelly's latest legal trouble. Later in "Return of the King,” O'Reilly is shown attacking Martin Luther King Jr. for saying that America should "love thy enemy" and "turn the other cheek,” even in respects to the 9/11 attacks. The Chaser's War on Everything featured a segment in its second season where it poked fun at The O'Reilly Factor.

== Cancellation ==
After five sexual harassment settlements by O'Reilly and Fox News were reported by The New York Times, The O'Reilly Factor lost more than half its advertisers within a week, almost 60 companies withdrew their ads. Despite the loss of advertisers, The O'Reilly Factor's ratings increased during the controversy. On April 11, 2017, O'Reilly announced he would take a two-week vacation and would return to the program on April 24, 2017. His plans to return, however, would not come to pass, as he was fired eight days later, and his show was cancelled soon afterwards. Online, references to O'Reilly on FoxNews.com were immediately removed, with the main show website redirecting to the FoxNews.com homepage and its content removed. The program continued for three more episodes without O'Reilly, but the title was shortened to The Factor. Dana Perino guest hosted the show on April 19, 2017 and April 20, 2017 and Greg Gutfeld hosted the final episode on April 21, 2017.

In the April 19, 2017 episode, Perino read a prepared statement about O'Reilly's dismissal equivalent to what the network had released earlier in the day. The reasons for his firing and the sexual harassment allegations were not mentioned in the program itself. The termination of employment of the former host was a major feature of news coverage on both MSNBC and CNN, outside of the prepared statements, it was not mentioned on-air during the program and other regular topics were covered. The following day, images of the host were removed from the front windows of the News Corp. Building. O'Reilly was not given an opportunity to sign-off on-air, instead releasing a statement through his agency about the matter, while continuing to deny the sexual harassment allegations against him. During the final episode Gutfeld spoke about the program's legacy and the loyalty of the show's staff after a segment with Tucker Carlson, followed by a fading of the stage's lighting to a dark state, revealing the set now blank of anything identifying the show.

The three-day interregnum allowed the network to sort out a new prime-time lineup to start on April 24, 2017, which saw Tucker Carlson Tonight move into the former The O'Reilly Factor time-slot, followed by the move of the late afternoon program The Five to 9:00 p.m. ET.

Fox News Channel primetime 8:00 pm – 9:00 pm timeslot
Preceded by New network, first timeslot broadcast programming	The O'Reilly Factor; 1996 – 2017	Succeeded by Tucker Carlson Tonight as 2017 – 2023
