= Jenna Lyons =

American fashion designer and business personality

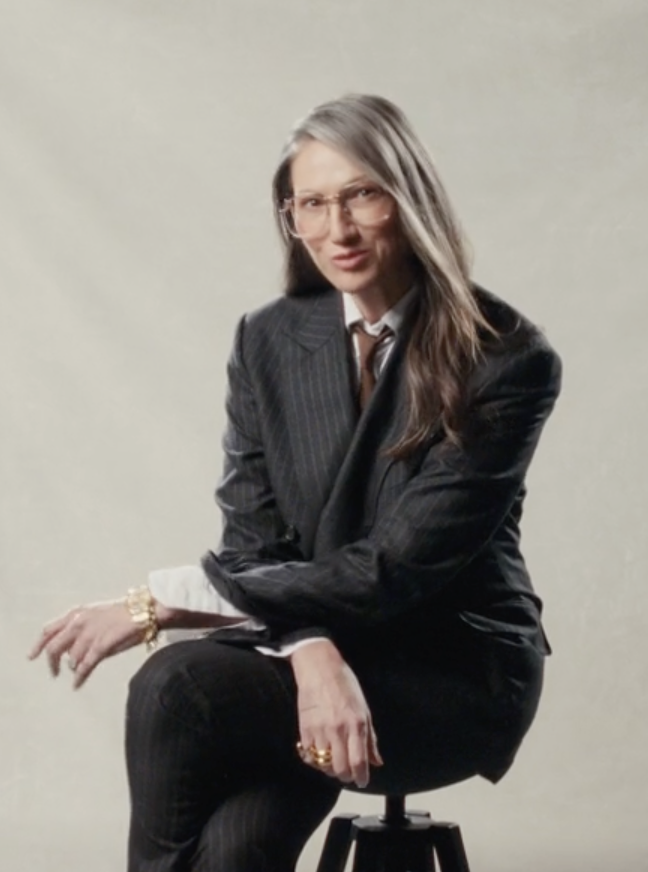
- Lyons in 2025
- Born: Judith Agar Lyons; June 8, 1968 (age 58); Boston, Massachusetts, U.S.
- Education: Parsons School of Design (BFA)
- Occupations: Fashion designer; businesswoman; television personality
- Years active: 1990–present
- Spouse: Vincent Mazeau (m. 2002; div. 2011)
- Partner: Cass Bird (2023–present)
- Children: 1

Judith Agar "Jenna" Lyons (born June 8, 1968) is an American fashion designer, businesswoman, and television personality. Lyons was the executive creative director and president of retailer J.Crew from 2010 until April 2017, when she announced her departure from the company. Lyons began working for J.Crew in 1990 and held various positions throughout her twenty-seven years at the company. In 2013, Lyons was referred to as the "Woman Who Dresses America". She is the CEO and co-founder of LoveSeen, a false eyelash beauty brand. She is also known for starring in the reality television series Stylish with Jenna Lyons and The Real Housewives of New York City, which she starred in from 2023 to 2025.

== Early life and education ==
Jenna Lyons was born Judith Agar Lyons in Boston, Massachusetts. Her family then moved to Palos Verdes, California, when she was four, where she endured heavy bullying throughout her youth due to her "gawkiness" and specific health problems; Lyons suffered from incontinentia pigmenti, a genetic disorder which scars the skin, causes hair to fall out in patches, and causes teeth to be malformed—hence the reason she wears dentures.

Much of Lyons' outlook and adolescent interests stemmed from her negative experiences. On the subject of growing up, and of her health, Lyons stated that: "[My health] made me introverted, but it was also the reason I loved fashion, because it can change who you are and how you feel, and that can be magical." Her mother was a piano teacher who encouraged her to get creative, leading to an interest in the fashion industry. Lyons, in spite of any setbacks, loved to rebel against her school uniform, and learned to sew by the seventh grade, which gave her more confidence. One of her personal motivations for success stems from witnessing her parents' divorce, and forming the subsequent conviction at a young age to never need to rely on a man to get-by.

After high school, Lyons enrolled at Otis College of Art and Design in Los Angeles, before then transferring to Parsons’ BFA Fashion Design program in New York City. Lyons graduated in 1990, alongside classmate and designer Derek Lam. During her senior year at Parsons, Lyons interned for fashion designer Donna Karan.

== Career ==
=== J.Crew ===
Lyons landed her first job at J.Crew when she was 21. She began as an assistant designer in men's wear, and her first assignment was redesigning men's rugby shirts for the company. By 2003, she was J.Crew's Vice President of Women's Design.

When former CEO and chairman Millard Drexler was hired in 2003, he and Lyons began to form a close relationship. The two were key players in helping J.Crew triple its revenue from just short of $690 million in 2003 to just shy of $2 billion in 2011. In April 2010, Lyons was appointed executive creative director of J.Crew. In July of that same year she was also appointed president of the company. Lyons has said of her holding both of these roles, "no financial decision weighs heavier than a creative decision. They are equal." In this role, Lyons oversaw the over one hundred designers of J.Crew and directed the layouts, designs, and looks for the J.Crew catalog, or as the company calls it, its Style Guide.

One of the biggest changes Lyons made at the company was reinventing their Style Guide. Lyons wanted it to have the feel of a fashion magazine, and the amount of editorial content increased drastically. This included a section entitled "Jenna's Picks" that looked at her opinions and revealed more about her everyday life. It also highlighted Lyons' personal clothing style, described by The New York Times as "geek-chic quirkiness, which mixed camouflage and sequins for day, and denim and taffeta for evening, all of it layered with big costume jewelry". Lyons crafted the brand and style of J.Crew around her trademark style. She made J.Crew a tastemaker in the industry, though Lyons herself does not like to refer to herself as a tastemaker.

While Lyons' work at J. Crew contributed to her fame, she also faced controversy in 2011 when she was featured painting her then 4-year-old son's toenails hot pink. Some called this act "an attack on masculinity." Others, however, viewed it as a breaking from gender norms. Despite it gaining national attention, such as being featured on The Daily Show with Jon Stewart where it was labeled "Toemaggedon", both Lyons and J.Crew initially declined to comment. Lyons later stated that her son was watching her paint her nails and simply requested that she paint his as well.

Lyons exited J.Crew in April 2017. Her departure was connected to declining sales and financial problems at the company. Her overarching role overseeing all aesthetic aspects of the brand (including store design and marketing) was not maintained, with the new chief design officer, Somsack Sikhounmuong, focusing more narrowly on women's, men's and children's clothing.

=== Television ===
In early 2014, Lyons made her acting debut in the third season of the HBO series Girls, where she played the role of a GQ editor that series creator Lena Dunham said was inspired by Lyons.

Lyons executive produced and starred in Stylish with Jenna Lyons, an unscripted reality competition series where contestants competed for a creative assistant job with Lyons, which debuted on HBO Max in December 2020. In October 2022, it was announced that Lyons was joining the cast of Bravo's The Real Housewives of New York City. The fourteenth season of the series, Lyons's first, premiered on July 16, 2023. She announced her exit from the series in November 2025, citing her decision to not film her personal life.

=== Other projects ===
In September 2020, Lyons launched LoveSeen, a false eyelash beauty brand. She is co-creator and CEO of the company.

== Personal life ==
Lyons was married to artist Vincent Mazeau from 2002 until 2011. They have a son.

Lyons is queer. During the midst of her divorce from Mazeau in 2011, Lyons was outed by the New York Post. Lyons later recounted that the publication contacted her while she was at work to tell her that they would be running a story about her being in a relationship with a woman, Courtney Crangi. Lyons expressed that the experience was traumatic for her because she wasn't ready to publicly come out and hadn't even told her friends and family about the relationship at the time. In 2012, Lyons publicly acknowledged Crangi as her girlfriend. Lyons and Crangi split up in December 2017.

In 2023, Lyons announced that she is currently in a relationship with photographer Cass Bird.

== Awards and accolades ==
Lyons won Glamour's 2012 Women of the Year award. She is a member of the Council of Fashion Designers of America Board of Directors.

In 2013 Lyons was selected for the Time 100 list of top 100 most influential people as a Tastemaker, noted for how "she has made fashion relatable... She understands our zeitgeist. Being fashionable doesn’t mean being trendy; it means having a sense of style."
