= The Five (talk show) =

American panel talk television series

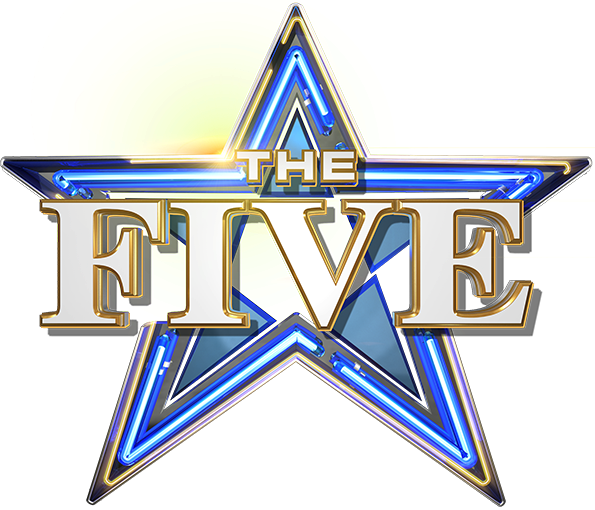
- Genre: News program and talk
- Created by: Roger Ailes
- Presented by: Greg Gutfeld; Dana Perino; Jesse Watters; Jessica Tarlov; Harold Ford Jr.; Emily Compagno
- No. of seasons: 15

Production
- Production location: New York City
- Camera setup: Multi-camera
- Running time: 60 minutes

Original release
- Network: Fox News
- Release: July 11, 2011 – present

The Five is an American conservative political talk show on Fox News in which full-time hosts Greg Gutfeld, Dana Perino, Jesse Watters, Emily Compagno, and alternating hosts Jessica Tarlov and Harold Ford Jr. discuss timely stories, political issues, and pop culture. The one-hour show premiered on July 11, 2011, and airs live weekdays at 5 p.m. ET, with repeat episodes airing at 12 a.m. ET Tue-Sat and an additional re-airing at 5 a.m. ET on Saturdays.

== Format ==
According to the initial Fox News press release announcing The Five, the show features a "roundtable ensemble of five rotating Fox personalities who ... discuss, debate and at times debunk the hot news stories, controversies and issues of the day." In the video section of Fox News' website, it is promoted as "the hot topics that have everyone talking from the five voices that will have everyone listening."

The show is made up of six blocks. Each of the first five blocks is introduced, closed and loosely moderated by a different co-host. The co-host's block may have a single topic or multiple topics. The final block is a brief wrap-up segment called "One More Thing." Episodes typically begin with one of the hosts naming themselves and their fellow panelists, before reciting the show's opening catchphrase: "It's five o'clock in New York City, and this is The Five." Former Fox News chairman Roger Ailes said the format for the show was inspired by chat-oriented programs such as The View; it has also been compared to the "Great American Panel" segment on Fox News' Hannity.

== Hosts ==
Daily hosts
- Greg Gutfeld: (2011–present) writer and host of Gutfeld!
- Dana Perino: (2011–present) co-anchor of America's Newsroom and former White House press secretary for George W. Bush
- Jesse Watters: (2017–present) host of Jesse Watters Primetime
- Emily Compagno: (2026–present) legal analyst and former co-host of Outnumbered

Alternating liberal hosts
- Jessica Tarlov: (2022–present) Fox News contributor
- Harold Ford Jr.: (2022–present) former Tennessee congressman, Fox News contributor

Former hosts
- Andrea Tantaros: (2011–2014) Departed the program after being named co-host of Outnumbered. Later left the network after accusing former Fox News CEO Roger Ailes of sexual harassment.
- Bob Beckel: (2011–2015, 2017) Originally departed the program to join CNN, then returned in early 2017 and was later fired after allegedly making racist remarks to a co-worker.
- Eric Bolling: (2011–2017) Left the program after he was named co-host of Fox News Specialists, was later fired from the network after he was accused of sexual harassment.
- Kimberly Guilfoyle: (2011–2018) Abruptly left Fox News in July 2018 to work for the Donald Trump 2020 presidential campaign.
- Juan Williams: (2011–2021) Departed the program to remain in Washington, D.C. with his family after the show was moved back to in-studio production after Memorial Day in 2021 following the COVID-19 pandemic in New York City. Williams had been broadcasting from home in D.C. for the entirety of the pandemic. He remains with Fox as a senior political analyst.
- Geraldo Rivera: (2022–2023) Announced on Twitter that he would be leaving the program after June 30, 2023. Hours before his scheduled appearance on the show he announced that he had been fired from The Five and that he quit Fox after 23 years as a result. Rivera had been seen less frequently on the program after numerous on air spats with co-hosts Greg Gutfeld and Jesse Watters.
- Jeanine Pirro: (2022–2025) Left the network on May 8, 2025 after she was tapped by President Donald Trump to serve as the U.S attorney for the District of Columbia.

In 2019, Gutfeld, Brazile, Perino, Watters, and Williams appeared as featured vocalists on country music singer John Rich's single "Shut Up About Politics", credited as "John Rich with The Five." The song reached number 91 on the Billboard Hot 100 and 17 on Hot Country Songs, and also credited Gutfeld as a co-writer.

== Reception ==
Reaction to the show among critics has been mostly positive, though the week it premiered, Alex Pareene, columnist for the website Salon.com, slammed it as "boring and lame" and "not even worth getting outraged about." Entertainment Weekly TV critic Ken Tucker dubbed the show his "favorite guilty pleasure" and praised its freewheeling style and zany humor, calling it "a delightfully nutty show with an undercurrent of ragin' crazy." Mediaite's Frances Martel, examining cable news' shift toward more personality-driven commentary, praised The Five for adding an element of entertainment to the news:

Beyond having opinions, the new generation of cable news talk shows spearheaded by The Five have personalities, characters and character arcs that are worth tuning in for. ... Unlike the previous, host-driven generation of opinion shows, The Five adds a refreshing new element to cable news—a plot.

In 2014, The Daily Show echoed these sentiments when their "correspondent" Samantha Bee debuted her "one-woman show" about the supposed romantic subplot on The Five. The show's loose and uncensored structure has led it into some minor controversies, particularly involving co-host Bob Beckel's on-air profanity and insensitive remarks. In August 2011, Beckel was forced to apologize on-air when, while trying to clarify an earlier remark wherein he called Michael Vick a "redneck," said the term was not racial, because "blacks are rednecks, whites are rednecks, I was a redneck, Chinamen are rednecks." Beckel was later compelled to apologize for using the term "Chinamen". The music the show's producers use to lead in and out of segments has also led to controversy, such as an incident in 2011 that prompted a Twitter war between Adam Levine and various Fox News personalities, over the producers' use of a song from Levine's band Maroon 5.

In April 2017, just two days after joining the show, co-host Jesse Watters came under scrutiny for a suggestive joke about the way Ivanka Trump was speaking into a microphone. The day after Watters made the comments, he announced that he would be "taking a vacation" for the remainder of the week amid calls for his firing. The success of the show has resulted in Fox News debuting several other talk shows such as Outnumbered in 2014, Gutfeld! in 2021, The Big Weekend Show in 2023 as well as The Big Money Show and The Bottom Line w/ Dagen & Duffy on Fox Business. On March 28, 2024, it was reported that former Hunter Biden business partner Tony Bobulinski was suing liberal co-host Jessica Tarlov for $30 million after comments she made regarding allegations that a Trump Super-Pac was paying Bobulinki's legal bills, a claim that he denies. Tarlov made an on air correction the day after she made those comments saying “I have seen no indication those payments were made in connection with Mr. Bobulinski’s legal fees and he denies that they were.”

== Programming announcements and changes ==
On October 3, 2011, after successful ratings and high popularity, Fox News announced that The Five would become a permanent series, as the program had previously been announced to last only during the summer. In 2013, The Five was the second-most-watched program in all of cable news in the United States, placing only behind The O'Reilly Factor, also on the Fox News Channel. The program has occasionally been the number one rated cable news series in the key 25 to 54 viewing demographic. Co-host Andrea Tantaros left the show in 2014 after she was named co-host of Outnumbered. On February 27, 2017, the program was moved to Studio F with a graphics makeover. On April 24, 2017, The Five moved to the 9 p.m. hour, following the cancellation of The O'Reilly Factor. In May 2017, liberal co-host Bob Beckel was fired from Fox News due to racism allegations. On September 25, 2017, The Five returned to its original 5 p.m. time slot to satisfy viewer preference.

In July 2018, founding co-host Kimberly Guilfoyle departed the program. Donna Brazile, former head of the Democratic National Committee who joined the network from 2019 and 2021, served as a guest host on the program. On May 26, 2021, the shows founding liberal co-host Juan Williams announced he would be leaving the program to stay with his family in Washington D.C. after the show returned to in studio production in NYC. In January 2022, The Five announced Jeanine Pirro would be named co-host of the program along with rotating liberal co-hosts Geraldo Rivera, Jessica Tarlov and Harold Ford Jr. On June 21, 2023, liberal rotating host Geraldo Rivera announced he would be departing the program on June 30, 2023. On June 29, 2023, he announced that he had been fired from the show hours before his scheduled appearance. Co-host Jeanine Pirro departed the program on May 8, 2025 after being named U.S attorney for the District of Columbia by Donald Trump.

== Ratings ==
Initially airing as a replacement for Glenn Beck's program after his departure from the network, The Five debuted in July 2011 to modest ratings, but still handily won its time slot. The show gained broader success within weeks of airing, even rivaling Beck's former audience share on some afternoons. By late August, The Five was consistently beating its competitors on MSNBC and CNN combined and ranked among the top ten cable news shows. Additionally, the show proved to be more friendly to advertisers, who were previously reluctant to be associated with the controversial content of Beck's show. The Five was the sixth-most-watched cable news program during the latter half of 2011 and the first quarter of 2012; it had jumped to fourth place by the third quarter of 2012, pulling in especially high numbers during the 2012 Republican Convention. The Five drew 4.4 million viewers on Election Day 2012.

By 2013, The Five was the second-most-watched program in all of cable news, placing behind The O'Reilly Factor, although the show was eclipsed on many nights by The Kelly File, which aired from 2013 to 2017. In April 2022, The Five became the number one show on cable, even out performing Tucker Carlson Tonight and the rest of Fox News' primetime lineup in the ratings. By the end of the second quarter of 2022, The Five became the most watched show in cable news, beating every single Fox News, CNN and MSNBC primetime shows in the ratings with an average of 3.3 million viewers. The Five closed out 2022 as the most watched non-primetime show in cable news history for an entire year, averaging 3.5 million viewers.

Following Fox News firing primetime host Tucker Carlson, the network saw a significant drop in viewership. In mid-2023, The Five was averaging between 2.5–2.7 million viewers per night. The program still held its title as the number one show in not only cable news, but all of cable. The program closed out 2023 as the most watched show in all of Cable News as well as making history as the most watched non-primetime show for the second consecutive year in a row, averaging 2.9 million viewers. The Five closed out the first quarter of 2024 averaging 3.04 million viewers and continues to break records by becoming the first non-primetime program ever to top all of cable news for ten consecutive quarters. On July 15, 2024, the show notched its highest rated episode to date, bringing in 5.5 million viewers. This was The Five's first episode since the attempted assassination of Donald Trump, as well as its first day broadcasting at the 2024 Republican National Convention.

== Location ==
The Five is recorded live at 5 pm. ET from Studio M at 1211 Avenue of the Americas (also known as the News Corp. Building), New York City. On February 27, 2017, The Five relocated to Studio M from its original filming location in Studio D.

Preceded by The Will Cain Show	The Five; 5:00 pm – 6:00 pm	Succeeded by Special Report with Bret Baier
