= J.Crew =

American retail company

J.Crew Group, Inc.
- Type: Private
- Industry: Retail
- Founded: 1947; 79 years ago (as Popular Merchandise, Inc.); 1983 (as J.Crew)
- Founders: Mitchell Cinader; Saul Charles
- Headquarters: 225 Liberty Street, New York City, US
- Number of locations: 506 (2018)
- Key people: Libby Wadle(CEO); Julia Collier(CMO)
- Products: Clothing, shoes, and accessories
- Revenue: ▲US$2.54 billion (2019)
- Net income: ▲US$−78.8 million (2019)
- Total assets: ▲US$1.599 billion (2019)
- Total equity: ▼US$−1.35 billion (2019)
- Owner: Anchorage Capital Group and Leonard Green & Partners
- Number of employees: 9,400 (2019)
- Divisions: J.Crew crewcuts The Liquor Store (defunct); The Ludlow Shop; J.Crew Factory; J.Crew Mercantile; Madewell
- Website: jcrew.com

J.Crew Group, Inc., is an American multi-brand, multi-channel, specialty retailer. The company offers an assortment of women's, men's, and children's apparel and accessories, including swimwear, outerwear, lounge-wear, bags, sweaters, denim, dresses, suiting, jewelry, and shoes.

In 2010, it sold via retail outlets, mail order catalogs, and an online store. As of August 2016, it operated more than 450 retail stores throughout the United States. On May 4, 2020, the company announced that it would apply for bankruptcy protection amidst the COVID-19 pandemic. J. Crew successfully exited bankruptcy protection in September 2020.

== History ==
=== Formation and catalog growth ===
In 1947, Mitchell Cinader and Saul Charles founded Popular Merchandise, Inc., a store that did business as Popular Club Plan and sold low-priced women's clothing marketed through in-home demonstrations. Throughout the mid-1980s, sales from catalog operations grew rapidly. "Growth was explosive—25 to 30 percent a year," Cinader later recollected in The New York Times. Annual sales grew from $3 million to more than $100 million over five years. In 1985, the "Clifford & Wills" brand was launched, selling women's clothing that was more affordable than the Popular Merchandise line. In 1987, two executives left the company to start their own catalog, Tweeds.

The 1980s marked a booming sales period for catalog retail giants Lands' End, Talbots, and L.L.Bean. Popular Merchandise initiated its own catalog operation, focusing on leisurewear for upper-middle-class customers, aiming for a Ralph Lauren look at a much lower price. The first Popular Club Plan catalog was mailed to customers in January 1983 and continued under that name until 1989. Popular Club Plan catalogs often showed the same garment in more than one picture with close-up shots of the fabrics, so customers could get a sense of how the garment looked on the body and be assured of the company's claims of quality.

=== Name change and first stores ===
In 1983, Popular Merchandise, Inc. became known as J.Crew, Inc, taking its name from the sport crew with a J affixed for graphical appeal. The company attempted but failed to sell the Popular Club Plan brand. Also in 1989, J.Crew opened its first retail store, in South Street Seaport in downtown Manhattan.

J.Crew Group was owned by the Cinader family for most of its existence, but in October 1997, investment firm Texas Pacific Group Inc. purchased a majority stake. By the year 2000, Texas Pacific held an approximate 62 percent stake, a group of J.Crew managers held about 10 percent, and Emily Cinader Woods, the chairman of J.Crew, along with her father, Arthur Cinader, held most of the remainder. The brand Clifford & Wills was sold to Spiegel. in 2000 with the intent to boost sales. In 2004, J.Crew bought the rights to the brand Madewell, a defunct workwear manufacturer founded in 1937, and used the name from 2006 onwards as "a modern-day interpretation", targeted at younger women than their main brand.

=== Going public, return to private ===
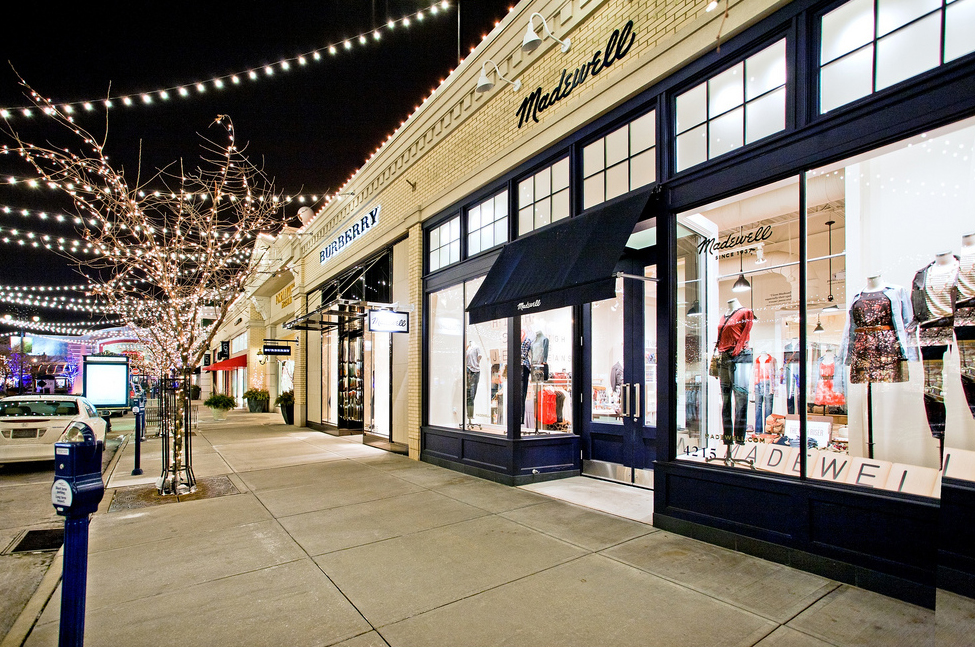
A Madewell store at Easton Town Center in Columbus, Ohio

In 2006, the company held an IPO, raising $376 million by selling new shares equal to 33 percent of expanded capital. However, in 2011, TPG Capital LP and Leonard Green & Partners LP took J.Crew private again in a $3 billion leveraged buyout. On November 23, 2010, the company had agreed to be taken private in a $3 billion deal led by management with the backing of TPG Capital and Leonard Green & Partners, two large private equity firms. The announcement of the offer from two investment firms—including one that used to own J.Crew—came as the retailer reported that its third-quarter net income fell by 14 percent due to weak women's clothing sales. The company also lowered its guidance for the 2010 year. Under the deal as proposed, J.Crew shareholders would receive $43.50 per share in cash, representing a 16 percent premium to the stock's closing price the prior day of $37.65. CEO Mickey Drexler, the former Gap Inc. chief credited with turning J.Crew around since coming aboard in 2003, remained in that role and retained a "significant" stake in the company (as of September 2010, he holds 5.4 percent of outstanding shares).

Shortly after the announcement of the deal, some in the business community criticized the terms of the deal involving the company's CEO and a majority shareholder. As a result, the "go-shop" period was extended shortly after the initial announcement. In addition, several investigations relating to potential shareholder actions against the company were announced. After the deal, TPG and Leonard Green borrowed more to help finance dividends totaled $787 million to them.

=== Recent ===
In June 2015, The New York Times reported that J.Crew's women's division was undergoing a slump because of the company's failure to react to two market trends: cheap "fast fashion" and "athleisure" items. In 2016, J.Crew partnered with Nordstrom to begin selling their products in stores and online. In December 2016, the company faced litigation after it moved its intellectual property "out of the reach of lenders."

In April 2017, the company cut 250 jobs, largely from its headquarters. The company also underwent several management changes, and long-term creative director Jenna Lyons left the company in April. The brand's longtime head of menswear, Frank Muytjens, left the company that month as well, and in June 2017, the company's CEO, Mickey Drexler, announced that he would leaving his CEO role after 14 years with the company. However, Drexler stated he would remain chairman and retain 10% ownership of the company.

On June 12, 2017, J.Crew Group Inc. announced it had "made an offer to some of its bondholders to push back its most pressing debt obligation—about $567 million due in May 2019—and amend its term loan." At the time, J.Crew Group had around $2 billion in debt. Also in 2017, Drexler approached Amazon Inc about selling J.Crew to the tech giant. In the summer of 2017, the company avoided a bankruptcy filing by having bondholders do a debt swap tapping into its brand name value. The majority of the bondholders agreed to the deal, with several others failing to stop the deal with a lawsuit. The deal lowered the company's debt. In September 2018, J.Crew began selling its standalone J.Crew Mercantile brand on Amazon.

On February 16, 2018, J.Crew hired Adam Brotman, a long-time Starbucks executive, as president and chief experience officer. Brotman's first major impact was launching "J.Crew Rewards", the company's first reward program independent of the company's credit card. The rewards program offers free shipping and $5 back for each $200 spent.

In November 2018, J.Crew announced its CEO, James Brett, would step down and be replaced by an office of the CEO consisting of four senior executives from J.Crew. Brett took up the position in June 2017. The company released a press release stating Brett's departure was a "mutual agreement" between Brett and the company's board of directors. Brett was replaced by Michael Nicholson (president and COO), Adam Brotman (president and chief experience officer), Lynda Markoe (chief administrative officer), and Libby Wadle, president of Madewell brand. The new office of the CEO will be responsible for managing J.Crew's operations as the board establishes a permanent management structure. On November 29, J.Crew announced the dissolution of their Nevereven, Mercantile, and J.Crew Home sub-brands. On April 11, 2019, J.Crew announced that president and COO, Michael Nicholson, would retain the title of interim CEO, along with the subsequent announcement of Brotman's departure.

J.Crew reported a net income of $1.5 million in the fourth quarter of 2019, up from a net loss of $74.4 million in quarter four of 2018.

On January 28, 2020, the retailer announced that Jan Singer would assume title of CEO. Singer was previously CEO of Victoria's Secret, Spanx and was an executive at Nike. She was to replace Nicholson, who would assume his previous position.

On May 4, 2020, J.Crew filed for Chapter 11 bankruptcy protection as a result of the COVID-19 pandemic, although the company had amassed enormous debt even before the outbreak.

Chinos Holdings, Inc. and 17 affiliated debtors filed Chapter 11 bankruptcy in the United States District Court for the Eastern District of Virginia. These debtors requested joint administration of the cases under Case No. 20-32181.

In September 2020, J.Crew permanently closed all six of its UK stores after its parent group emerged from Chapter 11 bankruptcy following an approval plan to cut its debts.

In November 2020, J.Crew appointed new chief executive officer. Libby Wadle replaced Jan Singer, who had been CEO for less than a year.

== Retail stores ==
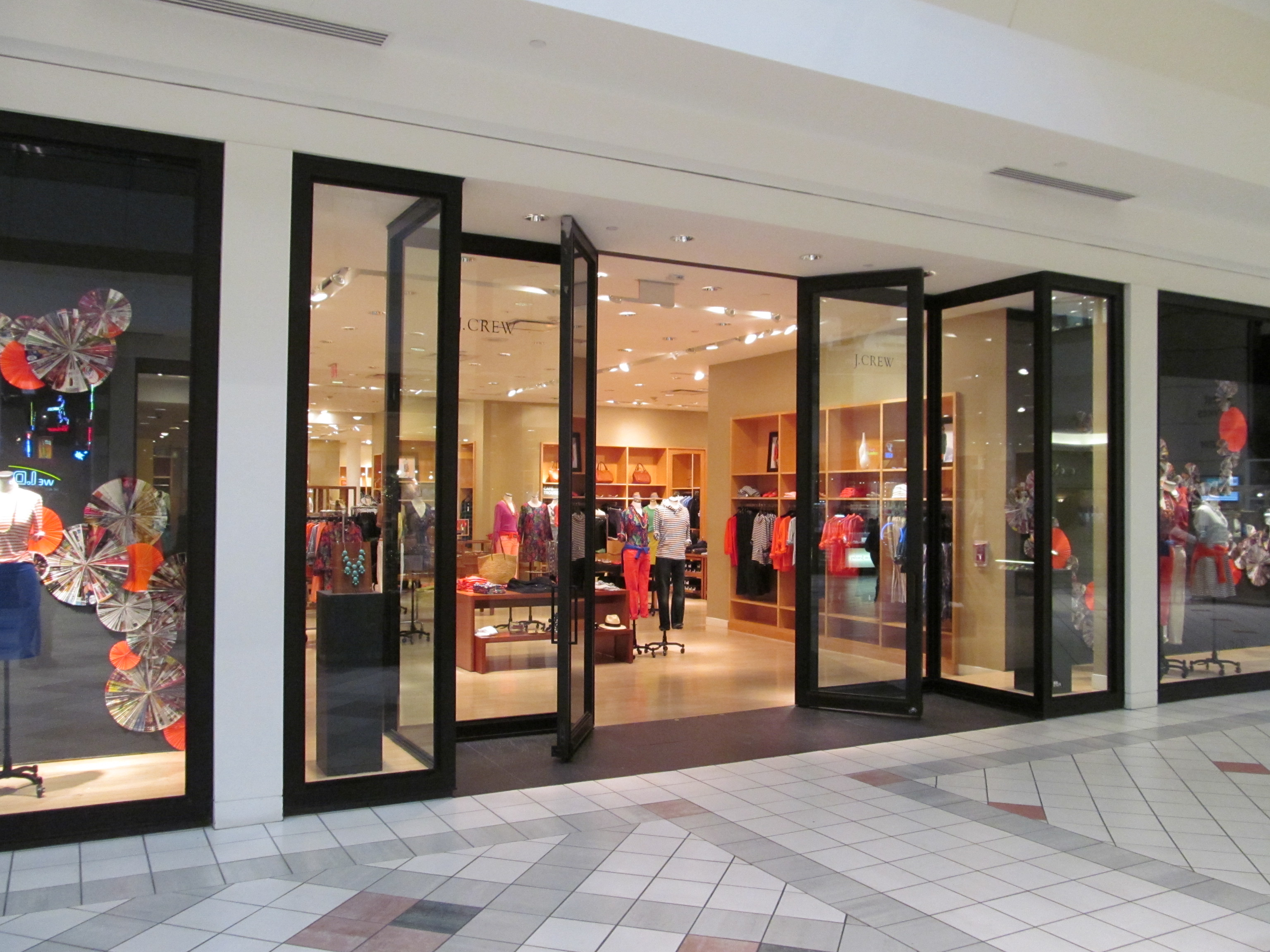
J.Crew at South Shore Plaza in Braintree, Massachusetts

The company once operated 506 retail stores, including 203 J.Crew stores, 129 Madewell stores, and 174 J.Crew Factory (including 42 J.Crew Mercantile) outlet locations, as reported in 2018. In 2010 it also had Crewcuts stores, using the name of its children's brand (styled lowercase crewcuts). The company also operates internationally in Canada, France, the UK, and Hong Kong. Additionally, the company has 76 locations in Japan, which are operated under license by ITOCHU Corporation.

In March 1989, the first J.Crew retail outlet opened in the South Street Seaport in Manhattan, and the company planned to open 45 more stores. Five months after the opening of its first store, J.Crew added two new catalog lines: Classics and Collections. Collections used more complicated designs and finer fabrics to create dressier and more expensive items, while Classics featured clothes that could be worn both to work and for leisure activities. In the fall of 1989, J.Crew opened three new stores in Chestnut Hill, Massachusetts; San Francisco, California; and Costa Mesa, California, all locations with strong catalog sales. By the end of the year, retail sales nearly hit $10 million. Despite 1989 revenues estimated at $320 million, J.Crew suffered a setback when its agreement to sell its Popular Club unit collapsed at the end that year. In addition, rumors circulated that the company's Clifford & Wills low-priced women's apparel catalog was doing poorly.

J.Crew saw revenues reach $400 million in 1990 but reported that its four existing stores had not yet started producing enough profits to cover their overheads. The next phase of store openings included outlets in Philadelphia, Cambridge, and Portland, Oregon. The company scaled back its plans for opening retail stores from 45 stores to 30 or 35. In early 1991, the company hired a director of new marketing development and began efforts to expand their sales into Canada. In April 1991, J.Crew mailed 75,000 J.Crew catalogs and 60,000 Clifford & Wills catalogs to potential customers in the province of Ontario. Response rates to this effort were slightly lower than in the United States, but each order, on average, was higher. In 1992, J.Crew intensified its push into international markets by hiring a new vice-president for international development. The company already mailed hundreds of catalogs to customers in Japan and Europe, most of whom had become acquainted with J.Crew while traveling or living in the United States.

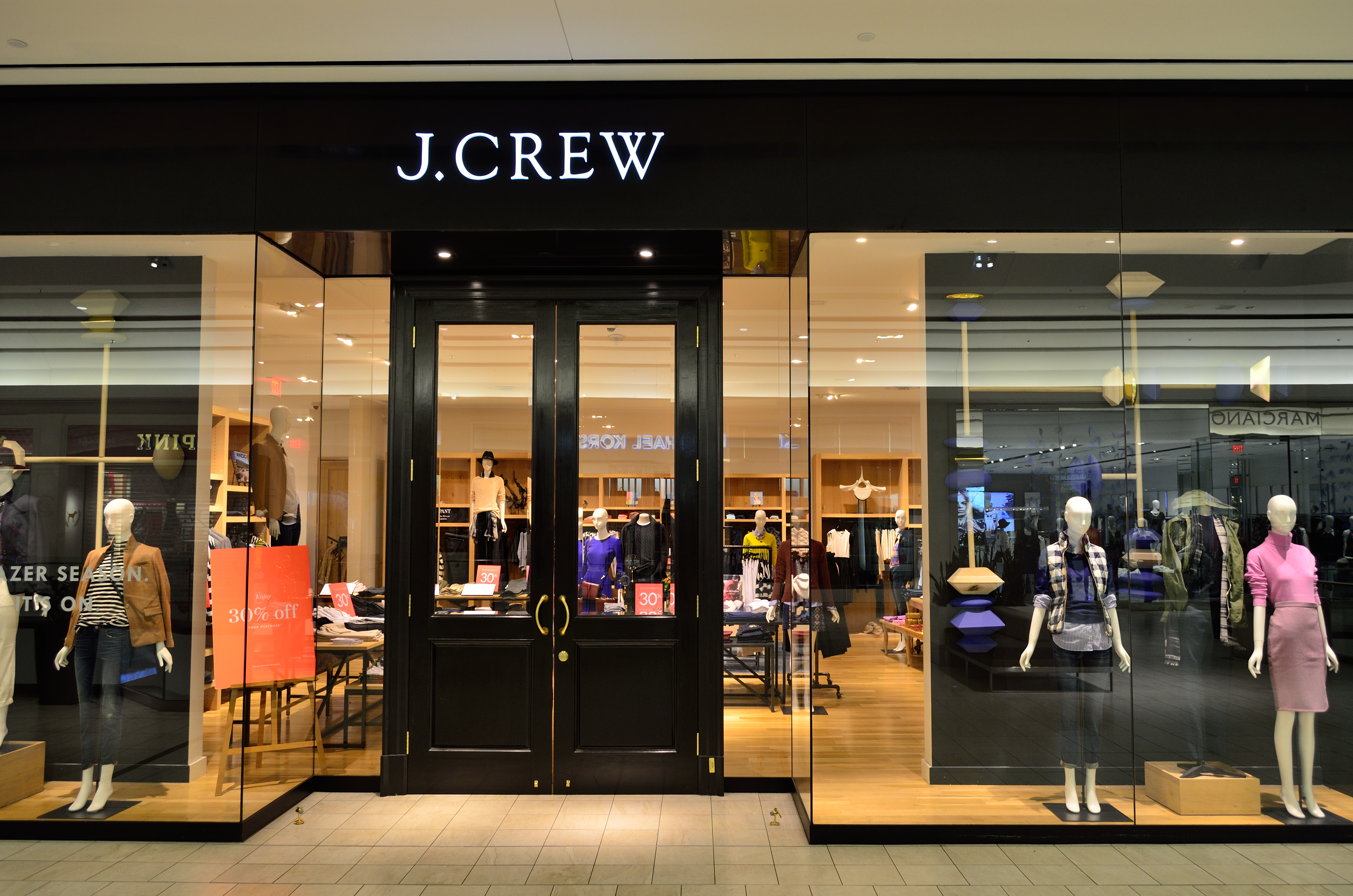
J.Crew in Markville Shopping Centre (now closed)

In 2011, J.Crew opened its first international store in the Yorkdale Shopping Centre in Toronto. In 2012, J.Crew announced four new Canadian locations: Edmonton in West Edmonton Mall, Vancouver on Robson Street, and Toronto in Fairview Mall (now closed) and the Toronto Eaton Centre. All locations were to carry women's and men's collections. Along with 5 new stores, although some of these stores have been closed recently. J.Crew announced opening two new factory stores in Canada: one in Vaughan Mills and the other in Edmonton (the second J.Crew in Alberta).

In an interview with the Financial Times in 2011, CEO of J.Crew Mickey Drexler said that J.Crew would be expanding to the UK with their flagship store being on London's Regent Street. He indicated that the company would be following up their recent expansion into Canada and Canadian e-commerce with a physical store in England, most likely followed by e-commerce elsewhere, such as France and Germany. Although a few locations were reviewed for the London store, including Covent Garden and the East End, the ultimate decision was to open on Regent Street.

From 2016 to 2018, J.Crew Group closed 96 J.Crew and J.Crew Factory retail locations. On March 2, 2020, J.Crew announced that it would pause the proposed Madewell IPO that was intended to be initiated on March 2. The company is considering a possible separation of J.Crew and Madewell into two separate companies.

== Marketing ==
Historically, each year the company issued 24 editions of the J.Crew catalog, distributing more than 80 million copies. Beginning in 2017, the catalog began being released with fewer pages and fewer issues per year.

J.Crew has been criticized for labeling its new super-small jeans as "size 000", and for advertising them as "toothpick jeans". Critics have said the labeling promotes vanity, a practice known as vanity sizing. The "size 000" is smaller than a size zero and has three zeros, implying that it is two sizes smaller than the smallest normal size. This has caused people to question whether negative sizes will be available in the future.

In early 2011, J.Crew was under fire by conservative media outlets for an advertisement featuring its creative director and president, Jenna Lyons, painting her son's toenails pink. Beneath the picture was a quote that read, "Lucky for me I ended up with a boy whose favorite color is pink." Some people were of the opinion that J.Crew was challenging traditional gender identity roles, although author Jo B. Paoletti said that it was "no big deal".

J.Crew has struggled in recent years with positioning the brand to appeal to consumers. In a December 2024 press release, J.Crew announced Julia Collier has been named Chief Marketing Officer.

== See also ==
- Informal wear
- Casual wear
