= List of programs broadcast by Fox Business =

This is a list of programs broadcast by Fox Business Network (FBN). Fox Business is an American cable and satellite business news television channel that was launched on October 15, 2007. It is owned by the Fox News Media division of Fox Corporation, and the network discusses business and financial news.

== Current programming ==
- Barron's Roundtable (2019–present)
- The Big Money Show (2023–present)
- The Bottom Line (2023–present)
- The Claman Countdown (2008–present)
- The Evening Edit with Elizabeth MacDonald (2018–present)
- Fox Business Tonight (2021–present)
- Kennedy (2015–present)
- Kudlow (2021–present)
- Making Money with Charles Payne (2014–present)
- Mornings with Fox Business (2015–present)
- FBN's Wall Street (formerly Maria Bartiromo’s Wall Street) (2017–2026)
- Strange Inheritance with Jamie Colby (2015–present)
- Varney & Co. (2012–present)
- WSJ at Large with Gerry Baker (2018–present)

== Former programming ==
- After the Bell (2008–2021)
- Bulls & Bears with David Asman (2018–2021)
- Cavuto: Coast to Coast (2015–2024)
- The Dave Ramsey Show (2007–2010)
- FBN:am with Cheryl Casone and Lauren Simonetti (2015–2020)
- Fox Business Happy Hour (2007–2010)
- Fox Business Morning (2007–2010)
- Freedom Watch with Judge Napolitano (2010–2012)
- Imus in the Morning (2009–2015)
- The Independents (2013–2015)
- The Intelligence Report with Trish Regan (2015–2018)
- Lou Dobbs Tonight (2011–2021)
- Markets Now (2007–2014)
- Money for Breakfast (2007–2009)
- The Opening Bell on Fox Business (2007–2010)
- Opening Bell with Maria Bartiromo (2014–2015)
- Risk & Reward with Deirdre Bolton (2014–2018)
- Stossel (2009–2016)
- Trish Regan Primetime (2018–2020)
