= List of Fox News Specials =

The Fox News Channel's documentary unit was headed by David Asman from August 2005 until he joined the Fox Business Channel in September 2007. The Executive Producer of the unit is Brian Gaffney. In March 2008, Fox began posting selected specials on the video clip internet site, Hulu.com. A list of the specials broadcast by Fox News includes:

Originally aired on	Title	Host
April 5, 2004	Who Is Jesus?	Jon Scott
September 13, 2004	U.N. Blood Money	David Asman
October 17, 2004	U.N. Blood Money: New Revelations	David Asman
December 5, 2004	Battle of Fallujah: Heroes of India Company	Greg Palkot
December 19, 2004	The Birth of Jesus	Jon Scott
February 13, 2005	U.N. Blood Money: Kofi Annan Under Fire	David Asman
April 24, 2005	Iran: The Nuclear Threat	Chris Wallace
May 29, 2005	In the Field with Steve Harrigan	Steve Harrigan
June 25, 2005	American Gangs: Ties to Terror?	Newt Gingrich
July 9, 2005	Discovery: Return to Space	Jon Scott
August 13, 2005	Company of Heroes	Jon Scott
August 20, 2005	The Pizza Bomber Mystery	Geraldo Rivera
October 15, 2005	Saddam Hussein on Trial	Dan Senor
November 13, 2005	The Heat Is On: The Case of Global Warming	Rick Folbaum
November 26–27, 2005	Thomas Sowell: In the Right Direction	Fred Barnes
December 3, 2005	Winning Iraq: The Untold Story	David Asman
December 18, 2005	Religion in America: Church and State	Brit Hume
December 24, 2005	A Special for Young People	Uma Pemmaraju
December 25, 2005	Can We Live Without God?	Lauren Green
December 25, 2005	Rewind 2005: What a Year!	David Asman
December 31, 2005	All-American New Year's 2006	Mike Jerrick and Juliet Huddy
February 19, 2006	The Bird Flu: Fact and Fiction	Newt Gingrich
March 11, 2006	Iran and the Bomb	David Asman
April 22, 2006	Crime Scene: Murder in the Heartland	Greta Van Susteren
April 23, 2006	Lion in the Desert	David Asman
April 30, 2006	Fox News Sunday at 10	Chris Wallace
May 7, 2006	Why He Fights	Bret Baier
May 21, 2006	Global Warming: The Debate Continues	David Asman
May 26, 2006	Crime Scene: Missing in Paradise	Greta Van Susteren
June 3, 2006	The Battle for Arab Democracy	Brit Hume and Dennis Ross
July 2, 2006	A Special for Young People (II)	Uma Pemmaraju
August 20, 2006	Purpose-Driven Life: Can Rick Warren Change the World?	David Asman
August 27, 2006	Why Does College Cost So Much...And Is It Worth It?	Newt Gingrich
September 16, 2006	Crime Scene: Dark Waters	Greta Van Susteren
October 7, 2006	Crime Scene: The Amish Schoolhouse Murders	Greta Van Susteren
October 8, 2006	Fox News Channel at Ten: Thank You, America	Martha MacCallum and Chris Wallace
October 14, 2006	North Korea: A Threat to the World	Shepard Smith
October 29, 2006	Hannity on America	Sean Hannity
November 4, 2006	Obsession: The Threat of Radical Islam	E.D. Hill
November 11, 2006	Crime Scene: Gambling on Love	Greta Van Susteren
November 18, 2006	Planet Mancow	Mancow Muller
December 16, 2006	One Nation Under God: Religion and History in Washington D.C.	Newt Gingrich
December 24, 2006	The Meaning of Christmas	Rick Warren
December 31, 2006	A Nashville New Year	Sean Hannity
December 31, 2006	All-American New Year 2007	Bill Hemmer and Julie Banderas
January 6, 2007	The Best of 'Geraldo at Large'	Julie Banderas
January 20, 2007	Smokescreen: Hezbollah in America	David Asman
February 3, 2007	Radical Islam: Terror in Its Own Words	E.D. Hill
February 10, 2007	Anna Nicole: Tragic Beauty	Geraldo Rivera
February 24, 2007	Reel Politics: If Hollywood Ran America	Bill McCuddy
March 24, 2007	Britney Spears: Toxic Exposure	Bill McCuddy
March 31, 2007	Socks, Scissors, Paper: The Sandy Berger Caper	David Asman
April 8, 2007	The Passion: Fact, Faith & Fiction	Lauren Green
April 22, 2007	Crime Scene: The Virginia Tech Massacre	Greta Van Susteren
May 13, 2007	V for Valor: American Heroes in Iraq	Trace Gallagher
June 24, 2007	Banned By PBS: Muslims Against Jihad	E.D. Hill
June 24, 2007	Secrets of Success	Uma Pemmaraju
July 6, 2007	After Diana: The Future of the Kingdom	Martha MacCallum
July 14, 2007	Final Delivery: The Pizza Bomber Mystery	Geraldo Rivera
August 11, 2007	Victory or Retreat: The Surge and Politics	David Asman
September 29, 2007	Iran: The Ticking Bomb	Dan Senor
October 13, 2007	Dick Cheney: No Retreat	Bret Baier
October 20, 2007	Inside Islam: Faith vs. Fanatics	E.D. Hill
October 27, 2007	Facing Reality: Choice	E.D. Hill
January 27, 2008	George W. Bush: Fighting to the Finish	Bret Baier
March 1, 2008	William F. Buckley: Right from the Start	David Asman
March 29, 2008	Jihad, USA: Homegrown Terror	E.D. Hill

Each special links to its page on FoxNews.com
