= Denise Shull =

American neuroeconomist (born 1959)

Denise K. Shull
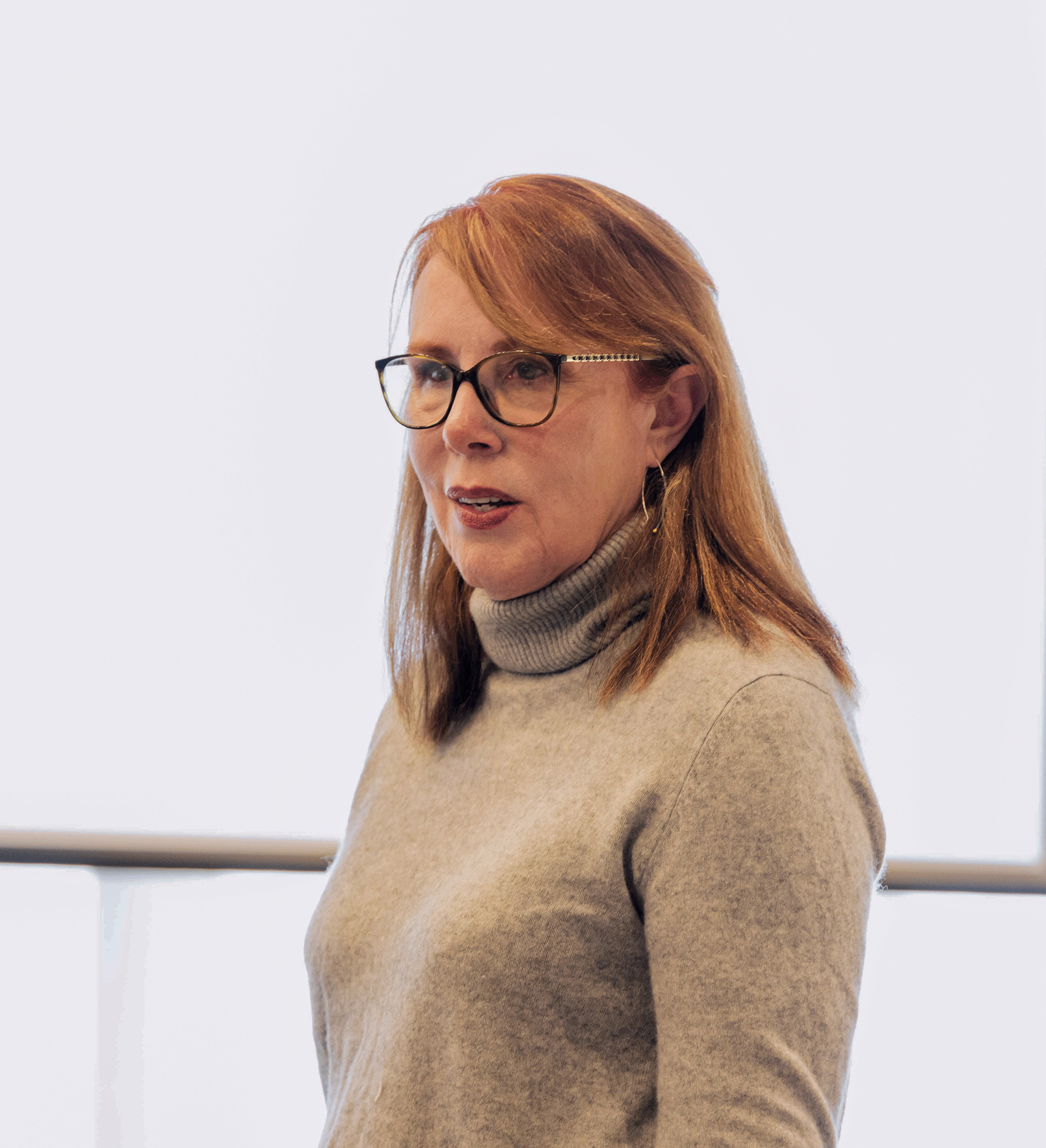
- Born: September 17, 1959 (age 66); Akron, Ohio, U.S.
- Education: University of Chicago; Harvard Kennedy School
- Occupation: Principal at The ReThink Group
- Organization: The ReThink Group
- Known for: Psychology of decision making in risk and human performance

Denise Kay Shull (born September 17, 1959, in Akron, Ohio) is a performance coach who uses neuroeconomics and modern psychoanalysis in her work with hedge funds and professional athletes. She is also the founder of The ReThink Group. Shull focuses on the positive contribution of feelings and emotion in high-pressure decisions. She is the author of Market Mind Games which explains how Wall Street traders act out Freudian transferences in reaction to market moves. Shull postulates that human perception contains fractal elements in the same manner as the fractal geometry of nature.

== Education ==
Shull received a Master of Arts from the University of Chicago in 1995. Her thesis research, "The Neurobiology of Freud's Theory of the Repetition Compulsion" was published in 2003 in the Annals of Modern Psychoanalysis and was cited in 2013 as one of the first papers ever written in the emerging field of neuro-psychoanalysis. In 2009, she graduated from the Harvard Kennedy School's Executive Education program in "Investment Decisions and Behavioral Finance".

== Career ==
From 1983 to 1988 Shull worked as a marketing representative at IBM. She became a short-term trader and trading desk manager in 1994 at the Chicago Board Options Exchange, and later traded futures as a member of the Chicago Mercantile Exchange. During this period Shull began to formulate her application of neuropsychology to investment and trading at banks, hedge funds, and proprietary funds, working in the budding interdisciplinary field of neuroeconomics.

In 2003, Shull created The ReThink Group to address the challenges of slumps, repetitive mistakes and confidence crises in portfolio managers and traders. In 2016, ReThink added Olympians, pro poker players and professional athletes to their roster.

Shull and The ReThink Group have developed new technologies and techniques for understanding and evaluating decision-making. In 2016, for Bloomberg, The ReThink Group developed the "Trader Brain Exercise", or what they now call the "Intuition Brain Game". Additionally, Shull and The ReThink Group have created a tool called "HEADSx", a talent assessment metric to evaluate potential hires.

== Legal ==
Shull filed a copyright claim against Showtime Networks in 2018, claiming their show Billions plagiarized her 2012 book Market Mind Games. Her claim was updated in October 2019 to include a claim of false endorsement. It was dismissed. In May 2021, she appealed the case, claiming that it was wrongly dismissed. She cited evidence that she met and consulted with the show's creators and that the two works (Billions and Market Mind Games) caused consumer confusion between her and character "Wendy Rhoades". In July 2021, the U.S. Court of Appeals for the Second Circuit affirmed a lower court's decision to dismiss the suit, saying that Shull's book and the show are not substantially similar.

== Publications ==
Shull's book Market Mind Games: a Radical Psychology of Investing, Trading and Risk (2012) was translated into Chinese in 2013. She served as the lead author of the chapter on trading psychology in Investor Behavior: The Psychology of Financial Planning and Investing (Wiley, 2014). Shull's first article "Freud's Path to Profits" was published in SFO magazine in 2004, and she has since written articles for Psychology Today, Hedge-Fund Intelligence, Thomson Reuters, CME Group, All About Alpha, and many hedge fund sites as well as her own blog.

== Media appearances ==
Shull's work has been profiled by The New York Times, Forbes Magazine, The Guardian, The Wall Street Journal, University of Chicago Magazine, Business Insider, Financial Times, Bloomberg Businessweek, The New York Observer, The Globe and Mail, The New York Times' Dealbook, New York Post and The Huffington Post amongst others. With the popularity of Billions, Shull has also been covered by Fortune, and has appeared on Fox Business News with Liz Claman. CNBC's Squawk Box has featured Shull in both the United States and Asia. She has also appeared on Bloomberg Television, Cavuto, PBS, CNBC, Discovery Channel and CNBC's Halftime Report where she analyzed the trading team's implicit motivations.
