= Varney & Co. =

Cable TV show on the Fox Business Network hosted by commentator Stuart Varney

- Also known as: Varney & Company
- Genre: Talk show
- Presented by: Stuart Varney; Susan Li; Lauren Simonetti; Madison Alworth; Lydia Hu; Ashley Webster
- Country of origin: United States
- Original language: English

Production
- Running time: 180 minutes

Original release
- Network: Fox Business Network
- Release: 2010 – present

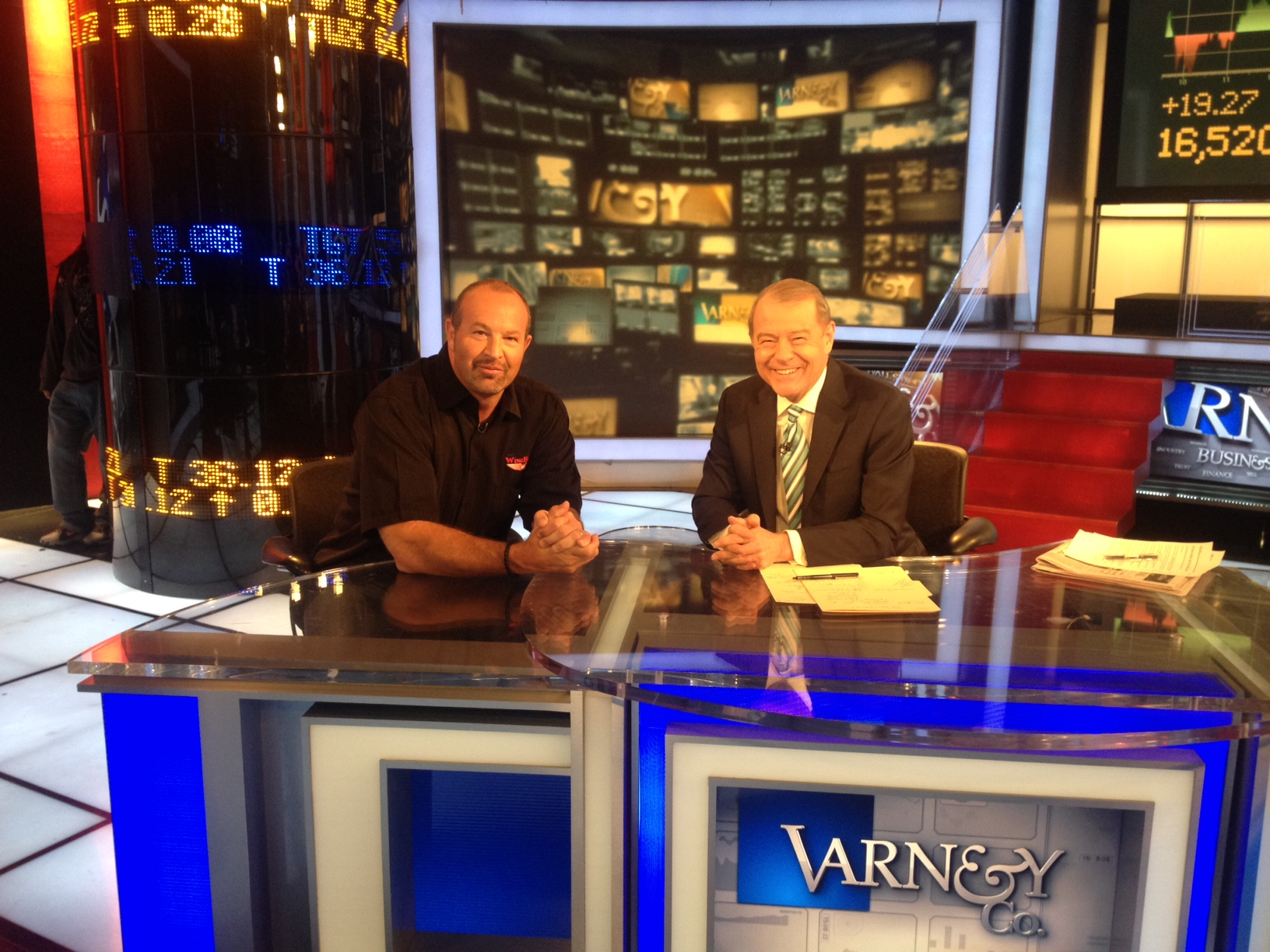
Stuart Varney (right) with Crawford Ker on the set of Varney & Co.

Varney & Co., sometimes styled Varney & Company, is an American cable television news and talk show on the Fox Business Network hosted by British-American economic and political commentator Stuart Varney. The show includes market coverage, current events coverage, and interviews and commentary with Wall Street experts.

== Hosts ==
- Stuart Varney, host (2010—present)
- Lauren Simonetti, news anchor (2015—present)
- Madison Alworth, news anchor (2024—present)
- Lydia Hu, news anchor (2025—present)
- Susan Li, correspondent, co-anchor (2019—present)
- Ashley Webster, guest host, contributor & correspondent (2010—present)

== Audience ==
In February 2015, Varney & Co. reached its highest-rated month since moving to the 11 am time slot, averaging 103,000 total viewers, 18,000 of whom were adults ages 25–54. Overall since the time change, the show was up 91% in total viewers and 31% among adults 25–54. On 24 August 2015, the show, which had switched to a three-hour slot from 9 am–12 pm, set the record for Fox Business Network for that block with 230,000 total viewers and 54,000 in the 25–54-year-old demographic. In February 2016, Varney & Co., still in the 9 am–12 pm slot, averaged 159,000 total viewers, up 65% from the same month one year prior.

== Guests ==
Over the years, many other well-known political figures and celebrities have appeared regularly on the show. Notable guests have included:

- Nicole Petallides (35 episodes)
- Kayleigh McEnany (33)
- Sandra Smith, television journalist and reporter (6)
- Henrik Fisker, entrepreneur and car designer (3)
- Monica Crowley (2)
- Scottie Hughes (2)
- Melissa Francis, television journalist (1)
- Les Gold, pawnbroker (1)
- Mary Kissel, journalist (1)
- Darcy LaPier, actress (1)
- Gina Loudon, author and psychology expert (1)
- Marc Siegel, physician (1)
- Shmuley Boteach, Orthodox rabbi and writer (1)
- Patrick M. Byrne, President and CEO of Overstock.com (1)
- Elisabeth Hasselbeck, television host (1)
- Michio Kaku, theoretical physicist (1)
- Megyn Kelly, Fox News reporter and television host (1)
- Tony Little, exercise instructor (1)
- Andrew Napolitano, judge and Senior Judicial Analyst for Fox News (1)
- Katherine Schwarzenegger, writer (1)
- Jon Taffer, bar consultant and television personality (1)
- Abby Wambach, Olympic gold medal professional soccer player (1)
- Harvey J. Kaye, historian (1)
- Jonathan Greenstein, Judaica expert (1)
- Phil Bryant, 64th Governor of Mississippi (1)
- Austan Goolsbee, economist (1)
- Julie Roginsky, Democratic Party strategist (1)
- Robert J. O'Neill, former US Navy SEAL, who shot and killed Osama bin Laden in 2014 (1)
- Sam Sorbo, actress (1)
- Pete Rose, baseball player (1)
- Donald Trump, 45th President of the United States (1)

== In popular culture ==
On 8 May 2014, Stephen Colbert on The Colbert Report satirized Stuart Varney, showing clips from his show and mocking him for being out of touch.

== See also ==
- Countdown to the Closing Bell
- Lou Dobbs Tonight
- Markets Now
- Stossel (TV series)

Preceded by Mornings with Maria	Varney & Co. 9:00 AM – 12:00 PM	Succeeded by Cavuto: Coast to Coast
