= Canisius University =

Jesuit college in Buffalo, New York, US

- Former name: Canisius College (1870–2023)
- Type: Private university
- Established: 1870; 156 years ago
- Religious affiliation: Catholic (Jesuit)
- Academic affiliations: ACCU AJCU NAICU
- Endowment: $155.8 million (2025)
- President: Steve Stoute
- Faculty: 254 (119 full-time/135 part-time)
- Students: 2,451 (fall 2024)
- Undergraduates: 1,724 (fall 2024)
- Postgraduates: 727 (fall 2024)
- Location: Buffalo, New York, United States; 42°55′31″N 78°51′10″W
- Campus: Urban, 72 acres (29.1 ha)
- Colors: Blue & gold
- Nickname: Golden Griffins
- Sporting affiliations: NCAA Division I - MAAC AHA
- Mascot: Petey the Griffin
- Website: www.canisius.edu

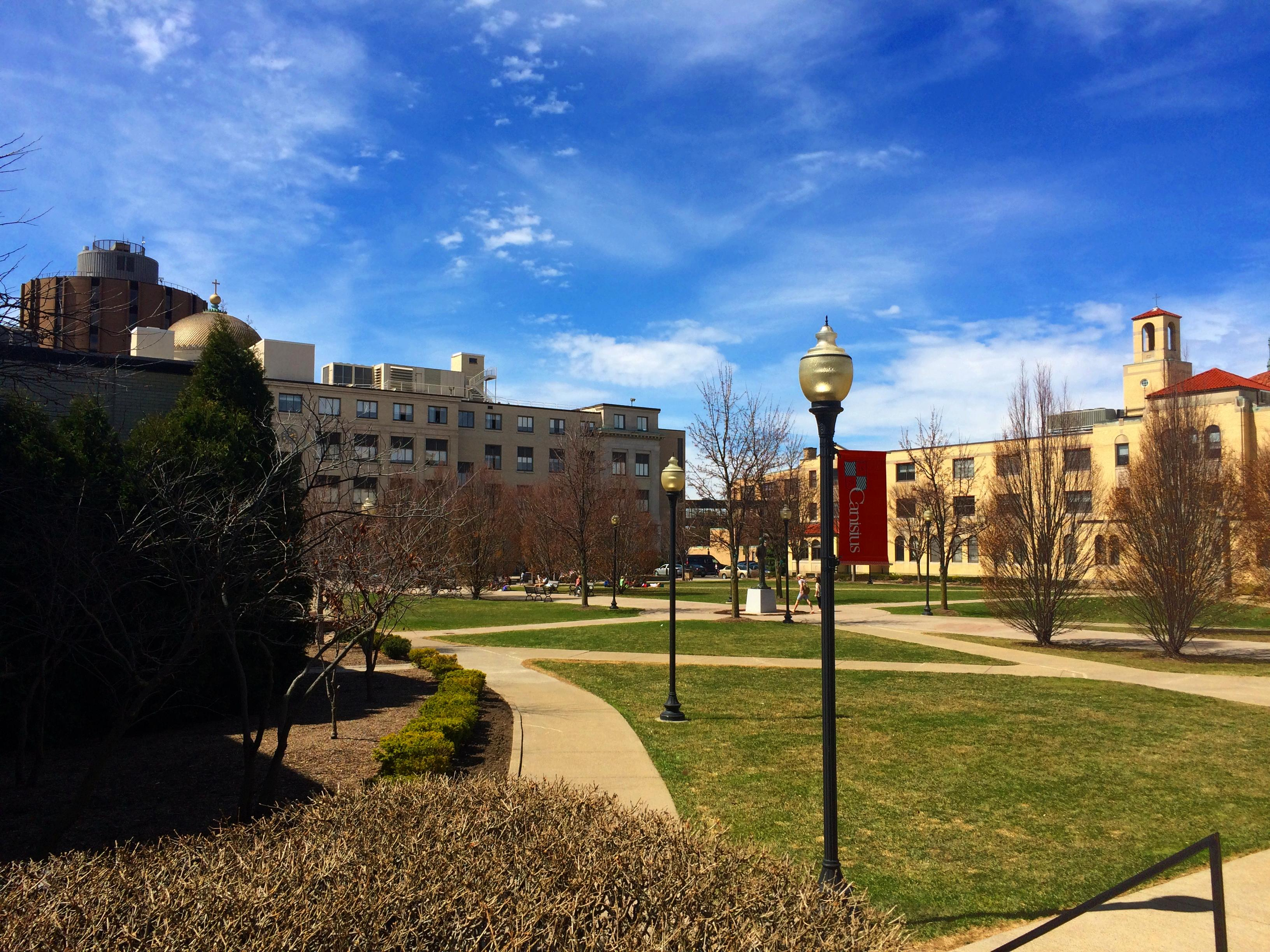
The campus

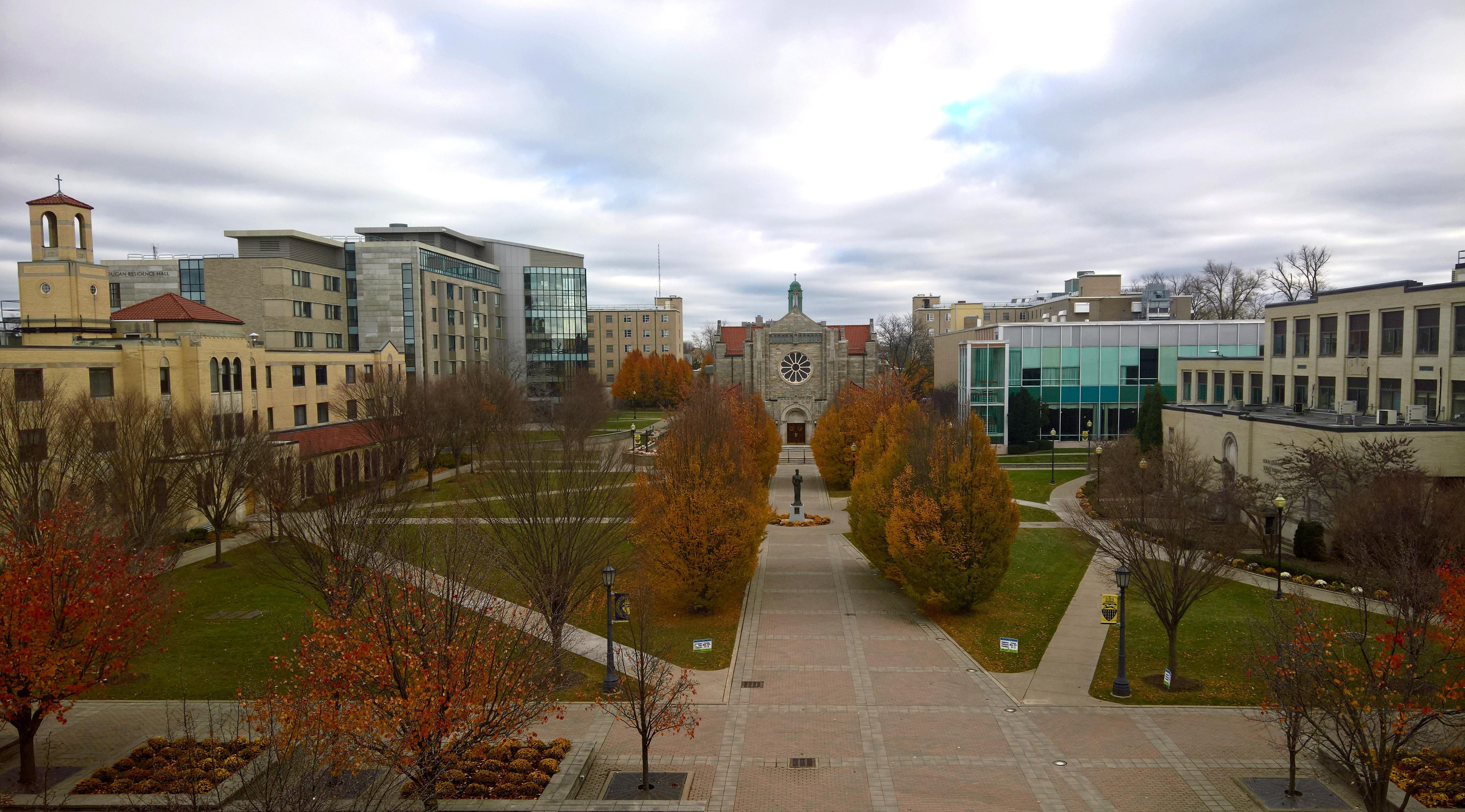
The campus

Canisius University (/kəˈniːʃəs/ kə-NEE-shəss) is a private Jesuit university in Buffalo, New York. It was founded in 1870 by Jesuits from Germany and is named after St. Peter Canisius. Canisius offers more than a hundred undergraduate majors and minors, and around thirty-four master's and certificate programs.

== History ==
Canisius has its roots in the Jesuit community that arose from disputed ownership of St. Louis Church in Buffalo in 1851. Rev. Lucas Caveng, a German Jesuit, along with 19 families from St. Louis Church, founded St. Michael's Church on Washington Street.

Canisius College along with Canisius High School were both founded in 1870, primarily for serving sons of German immigrants. Both were originally located at 434 Ellicott Street, next to St. Michael's Church. In 1913 construction of the Old Main building at 2001 Main Street was completed.

In 2015, Canisius College was one of more than 90 colleges investigated by the Department of Education's Office of Civil Rights for its handling of sexual assault and harassment complaints. In 2021, three former female student athletes filed a federal lawsuit in the Western District of New York alleging a hostile environment and that the college "failed to take appropriate action in response to these reports and complaints of sexual harassment, abuse and sexual assault". On June 27, 2022, a judge allowed the lawsuit launched by former Canisius athletes’ to proceed, describing the college’s delayed response to sexual assault allegations as "inexplicable."

=== Layoffs ===
In July 2020, President John Hurley and the board of trustees laid off 96 employees, including 25 faculty positions, most of them tenured. Several majors were eliminated, including Classics, Entrepreneurship, European studies, Fine Arts, Human Services, International Business, Physics, Religious Studies and Urban Studies. In response, the college's faculty senate issued votes of no confidence in the president and board of trustees. In June 2021, the college was sanctioned by the American Association of University Professors "for infringement of governance standards".

Several affected tenured faculty members sued the college for violation of contract. The lawsuit was resulted in a summary judgement in favor of Canisius in 2023, and an appeal by the faculty plaintiffs was dismissed in 2024, effectively ending case and allowing the dismissal of tenured faculty without a declaration of financial exigiency. The move attracted criticism from academic organizations, including the American Historical Association and the Association for Slavic, East European, and Eurasian Studies.

It officially changed its name to Canisius University on August 1, 2023.

=== Presidents ===
The early presidents of the college were German Jesuits. The first lay leader president of the college was John Hurley in 2010.

- John Hurley (2010–2022).
- Steve Stoute (2022–present)

== Campus ==
=== Christ the King Chapel ===
Christ the King Chapel, designed by Buffalo architect Duane Lyman, is centrally located to "symbolize its importance". It was completed in 1951 and has seating for 492.

=== Science Hall ===
Science Hall was built as a Sears and Roebuck store in 1929. The college has allocated $68 million for its renovation, over $35 million of which has been raised with help from the John R. Oishei Foundation.

=== Science Hall Parking Ramp ===
The parking ramp originally served the Sears and Roebuck building at 1901 Main St. However, throughout the history of ramp, Canisius students have used it for parking, with Sears advertising in The Griffin student newspaper that parking was free. Acquisition of the property has eliminated parking problems. The ramp was demolished in 2022. A new green space surface lot is planned to replace it.

=== Churchill Academic Tower ===
The 11-story Churchill Academic Tower was built in 1971, designed by Leroy H. Welch. It is named for its chief benefactor, Rev. Clinton H. Churchill and his wife Francis. The Tower is routinely derided but serves as a highly functional space.

=== Andrew L. Bouwhuis Library ===
Built in 1957 and upgraded in 1988 and from 2013 through 2015, Andrew L. Bouwhuis Library, named for Andrew L. Bouwhuis, S.J., college librarian from 1935 to 1955, furnishes extensive area for study and research. It seats 500 people.

=== The Koessler Athletic Center ===
Located at 1833 Main Street in Buffalo, the Koessler Athletic Center is named after J. Walter Koessler, class of 1922. The facility has a swimming pool, two weight rooms, two gymnasiums and locker rooms and offices for athletic coaches and support staff.

== Academics ==
Canisius offers more than 100 majors, minors, and special programs. The college is accredited by the Middle States Association Commission on Higher Education and specific programs are accredited by the Council for the Accreditation of Educator Preparation and the Association to Advance Collegiate Schools of Business. Through the George E. Schreiner '43, MD, Pre-Medical Center, the college caters to the biological and health science fields and holds close relationships with both the University at Buffalo School of Medicine and the Lake Erie College of Osteopathic Medicine.

=== Rankings ===
Canisius earned the 21st spot in the top tier of U.S. News & World Report's 2022 rankings of America's Best Regional Universities – North. U.S. News also ranked Canisius thirteenth in the 2016 "Great Schools, Great Prices" listing among regional universities in the North. Canisius earned the eighth spot among 49 regional universities in the North in U.S. News' Best Colleges for Veterans Ranking, as well as #4 in Best Value Schools and #26 in Top Performers on Social Mobility, for 2022. Canisius College alumni ranked first (1st), overall, in New York State on the 2014 CPA exam cycle, with a 75 percent pass rate, in the category of medium programs.

== Student life ==
Canisius has on campus about 90 clubs and organizations, vetted by the Undergraduate Student Association and its senators. Program offerings include the Best of Buffalo series, Fusion game nights, the Fall Semi-Formal, the Canisius Royals competition, the Mass of the Holy Spirit with Fall BBQ and Bonfire, Griffin Week, and Griff Fest. With a growing student population in its colleges, Buffalo has begun offering free Canal-side concerts, along with "Shakespeare in the Park", the Polish Broadway Market, Silo City "Boom Days" on Buffalo's industrial history, and Dyngus Day.

=== Athletics ===
The college sponsors 20 NCAA Division I athletic teams and is a member of the Metro Atlantic Athletic Conference (MAAC) as well as the Atlantic Hockey Conference. Men's sports include baseball, ice hockey, and golf. Women's sports include volleyball and softball. The Golden Griffins compete in the NCAA Division I and are members of the Metro Atlantic Athletic Conference (MAAC) for most sports, except for men's ice hockey which competes in the Atlantic Hockey America. In 2013, the men's ice hockey team won its first Atlantic Hockey Championship, earning a bid to the NCAA Tournament. In 2008, Canisius men's lacrosse won the MAAC tournament and earned its first bid to the NCAA Men's Lacrosse Championship tournament.

The Women's Lacrosse team won MAAC Championships four years in a row (2010–2014). The 2008 baseball team won its first regular season MAAC championship, with a 41–13 season, and the following year made its first appearance in the MAAC Championship game. In 2013, the team won the MAAC Championship and received its first bid to the NCAA tournament. The Canisius College softball team won the 2009 Metro Atlantic Athletic Conference tournament for its 3rd consecutive title, marking the team's 11th trip to the NCAA tournament in 15 years. Intramural sports are also offered for students, faculty, and staff.

Canisius' mascot is the Golden Griffin. The college adopted the Griffin as a mascot in 1932, after Charles A. Brady ('33) wrote a story in a Canisius publication honoring Buffalo's centennial year as a city. Brady wrote about Jesuit-educated explorer Rene-Robert LaSalle's Le Griffon, which was built in Buffalo. The Griffin was first used on the La Salle medal in 1932 and from there spread to the college newspaper, The Griffin, and sports teams. According to GoGriffs.com, the griffin is a "legendary creature with the body, tail, and back legs of a lion; the head and wings of an eagle; and an eagle's talons as its front feet." It represents values such as courage, boldness, intelligence, and strength befitting students and athletes alike.

The college was also the first home field of the Buffalo All-Americans of the early National Football League. Around 1917 Buffalo manager Barney Lepper signed a lease for the team to play their home games at Canisius College. The All-Americans played games at Canisius before relocating to Bison Stadium in 1924.

=== Greek life ===
The three college-approved Greek organizations on campus are the Lambda chapter of the fraternity Sigma Phi Epsilon (SigEp), the sorority Phi Sigma Sigma, and the professional organization Alpha Kappa Psi (AK Psi). Also there is a Classics Club which fosters the Jesuit value of a Classical education, as well as cura personalis.

=== Media ===
The student weekly newspaper is The Griffin, which replaced The Canisian in 1933 and continues to print weekly. The annual Quadrangle magazine contains student writings, artwork, and photographs. Public-access television cable TV broadcasts to Canisius College from its fourth floor studio at Lyons Hall. The WIRE, replacing WCCG, is the college's radio station, which broadcasts over the campus television system and is online through the college website.

=== ROTC ===
Canisius is the Reserve Officer Training Corps hub for Western New York. The Golden Griffin Battalion is composed of students from Canisius, University at Buffalo, Hilbert College, D'Youville University, Daemen University, Buffalo State University, and Erie Community College.

== Notable alumni ==
Canisius has approximately 40,000 living alumni worldwide who are working in the fields of business, journalism, government, law, medicine, and sports.

=== Academia ===
- James Demske, S.J. (Class of 1947), President of Canisius College (1966–1993)

=== Business ===
- John Rowe (Class of 1966), former chairman and CEO of Aetna
- Dennis F. Strigl (Class of 1974), President and CEO of Verizon Wireless
- Mary Wittenberg, (Class of 1984), President and CEO of the New York Road Runners

=== Journalism and television ===
- Anne Burrell (Class of 1991), Food Network chef
- Norm Hitzges (Class of 1965), Texas Radio Hall of Fame, SportsRadio 1310 The Ticket - Dallas, TX
- Elizabeth MacDonald (Class of 1984), Gerald Loeb Award and multiple other awards winning financial journalist with The Wall Street Journal, anchorwoman on Fox Business, appeared on NBC's The Today Show, ABC's World News Tonight, Outnumbered, Your World with Neil Cavuto, CBS This Morning, C-SPAN, Court TV, ABC News Radio, NPR, and others
- Todd McDermott, (Class of 1983), Emmy Award-winning news anchor at WPIX-TV, Pittsburgh, Pennsylvania
- Michael Scheuer (Class of 1974), CBS News terrorism analyst, former CIA Chief of the Bin Laden Issue Station and author of Imperial Hubris
- Adam Zyglis, (Class of 2004), Pulitzer Prize-winning editorial cartoonist for The Buffalo News

=== Government and law ===
- John Thomas Curtin (Class of 1946), US Attorney and Federal Judge for the Western District of New York
- Charles S. Desmond (Class of 1917), Chief Judge of the New York Court of Appeals
- John J. LaFalce (Class of 1961), US Representative for New York
- Walter J. Mahoney (Class of 1930), Majority Leader of the New York State Senate and New York Supreme Court Judge
- Salvatore R. Martoche (Class of 1962), New York State Supreme Court Justice and former Assistant Secretary of the United States Treasury and Labor Departments
- Anthony M. Masiello (Class of 1969), mayor of Buffalo, New York
- Richard D. McCarthy (Class of 1950), US Representative for New York
- James T. Molloy (Class of 1958), Doorkeeper, US House of Representatives
- Henry J. Nowak (Class of 1957), US Representative for New York
- Denise O'Donnell (Class of 1968), US Attorney for the Western District of New York
- Bill Paxon (Class of 1977), US Representative for New York
- William M. Skretny (Class of 1966), Federal Judge for the Western District of New York
- Lawrence J. Vilardo (Class of 1977), Federal Judge for the Western District of New York
- Frank A. Sedita (Class of 1930), mayor of Buffalo, New York

=== Medicine and science ===
- Donald Pinkel (Class of 1947), pediatric cancer researcher; former Director of the St. Jude Children's Research Hospital

=== Psychology ===
- Paula Caligiuri, Distinguished Professor of International Business and Strategy at D'Amore-McKim School of Business, Northeastern University

=== Sports ===
- Cory Conacher, NHL player for the Tampa Bay Lightning, Ottawa Senators, Buffalo Sabres and New York Islanders
- Bob MacKinnon (Class of 1950), former NBA Head Coach and General Manager of the New Jersey Nets
- Chris Manhertz (Class of 2015) NFL tight end for the Denver Broncos
- Johnny McCarthy (Class of 1956), member of the 1963–64 NBA Champion Boston Celtics
- Gerry Meehan, former NHL player and General Manager of the Buffalo Sabres
- Dick Poillon, member of the 1942 NFL Champion Washington Redskins and Pro Bowl selection
- Michael Smrek (Class of 1985), member of the 1986–87 and 1987–88 NBA Champion Los Angeles Lakers
- Beth Phoenix, professional wrestler, Class of 2017 WWE Hall of Famer, former WWE Divas Champion & three-time WWE Women's Champion
- Matt Vinc, six-time NLL Champion 2012, 2013, 2014, 2023, 2024, 2025 for the Rochester Knighthawks and Buffalo Bandits
- Eyal Yaffe (Class of 1986), basketball player in the Israeli Basketball Premier League

=== Other ===
- Molly Burhans (Class of 2014), Environmentalist, Cartographer, Social Entrepreneur; United Nations Young Champion of the Earth, National Geographic Explorer, Head Cartographer of first global digital map of the Catholic Church.

== See also ==
- List of Jesuit sites
