= List of business news channels =

A business channels is a television channel that concentrate on business news.

== Business news channels ==
=== North America ===
- Bloomberg Television (produced by Bloomberg L.P.)
- BNN Bloomberg (Canadian channel produced by Bell Media)
- Cheddar
- CNBC (produced by Versant)
- Biz Television
- Fox Business Network (produced by Fox Corporation)
- TD Ameritrade Network

=== Asia ===
- Business Plus (Pakistani channel owned by Salman Taseer and his family)
- BTVI (Indian channel closed)
- CCTV-2 (Chinese channel)
- CNBC Asia
- CNBC Indonesia (Indonesian channel)
- CNBC TV18 (Indian channel)
- Ekhon (Bangladeshi channel)
- ET Now (Indian channel produced by the Times Group)
- NDTV Profit (Indian channel)
- Nikkei CNBC (Japanese channel)
- TTV Finance (Taiwanese channel)
- Zee Media Corporation (Indian channel)

=== Europe ===
- BFM Business (French channel)
- CNBC-e (Turkish channel)
- CNBC Europe
- Económico TV (former Portuguese channel produced by Ongoing Strategy Investments)

=== Other ===
- CNBC Arabiya
- CNBC Africa
- CNBC World

== See also ==
- Business journalism
