= List of Later with Greg Kinnear episodes (1995) =

This is the list of episodes for Later with Greg Kinnear in 1995.

== 1995 ==
=== January ===
No.	Original release date	Guest(s)
145	January 2, 1995	Corbin Bernsen

No.	Original release date	Guest(s)
146	January 3, 1995	Teri Garr

No.	Original release date	Guest(s)
147	January 4, 1995	Jada Pinkett Smith

No.	Original release date	Guest(s)
148	January 5, 1995	Sid Caesar

No.	Original release date	Guest(s)
149	January 9, 1995	Jasmine Guy

No.	Original release date	Guest(s)
150	January 10, 1995	Roy Firestone

No.	Original release date	Guest(s)
151	January 11, 1995	Adam Arkin

No.	Original release date	Guest(s)
152	January 12, 1995	Mimi Rogers

No.	Original release date	Guest(s)
153	January 16, 1995	Leeza Gibbons

No.	Original release date	Guest(s)
154	January 17, 1995	Jackie Mason

No.	Original release date	Guest(s)
155	January 18, 1995	Sinbad

No.	Original release date	Guest(s)
156	January 19, 1995	Wayne Gretzky

No.	Original release date	Guest(s)
157	January 31, 1995	Robert Townsend

=== February ===
No.	Original release date	Guest(s)
158	February 1, 1995	Joan Collins

No.	Original release date	Guest(s)
159	February 2, 1995	Dennis Rodman

No.	Original release date	Guest(s)
160	February 6, 1995	Mel Torme

No.	Original release date	Guest(s)
161	February 7, 1995	Penelope Ann Miller

No.	Original release date	Guest(s)
162	February 8, 1995	Richard Jeni

No.	Original release date	Guest(s)
163	February 9, 1995	Bob Costas

No.	Original release date	Guest(s)
164	February 13, 1995	Jerry Springer

No.	Original release date	Guest(s)
165	February 14, 1995	Jennie Garth

No.	Original release date	Guest(s)
166	February 15, 1995	Robert Wuhl

No.	Original release date	Guest(s)
167	February 16, 1995	Judge Reinhold

No.	Original release date	Guest(s)
168	February 20, 1995	Dick Cavett

No.	Original release date	Guest(s)
169	February 23, 1995	Ivan Lendl

=== March ===
No.	Original release date	Guest(s)
170	March 15, 1995	Lisa Kudrow

No.	Original release date	Guest(s)
171	March 16, 1995	Valerie Harper

No.	Original release date	Guest(s)
172	March 20, 1995	George Wendt

No.	Original release date	Guest(s)
173	March 21, 1995	Bill Maher

No.	Original release date	Guest(s)
174	March 22, 1995	Alan Thicke

No.	Original release date	Guest(s)
175	March 23, 1995	Janeane Garofalo

=== April ===
No.	Original release date	Guest(s)
176	April 3, 1995	Phil Hartman

No.	Original release date	Guest(s)
177	April 4, 1995	Wayne Newton

No.	Original release date	Guest(s)
178	April 5, 1995	Malcolm McDowell

No.	Original release date	Guest(s)
179	April 6, 1995	Mimi Rogers

No.	Original release date	Guest(s)
180	April 10, 1995	Gerry Spence

No.	Original release date	Guest(s)
181	April 11, 1995	Brett Butler

No.	Original release date	Guest(s)
182	April 12, 1995	Richard Belzer

No.	Original release date	Guest(s)
183	April 13, 1995	Harold Ramis

No.	Original release date	Guest(s)
184	April 17, 1995	John Lithgow

No.	Original release date	Guest(s)
185	April 18, 1995	Pauly Shore

No.	Original release date	Guest(s)
186	April 20, 1995	LL Cool J

No.	Original release date	Guest(s)
187	April 24, 1995	Jim Moret

No.	Original release date	Guest(s)
188	April 25, 1995	Dylan McDermott

No.	Original release date	Guest(s)
189	April 26, 1995	David Copperfield

No.	Original release date	Guest(s)
190	April 27, 1995	Leslie Nielsen

=== May ===
No.	Original release date	Guest(s)
191	May 1, 1995	Kadeem Hardison

No.	Original release date	Guest(s)
192	May 2, 1995	Laura San Giacomo

No.	Original release date	Guest(s)
193	May 3, 1995	Bruno Kirby

No.	Original release date	Guest(s)
194	May 4, 1995	Mario Van Peebles

No.	Original release date	Guest(s)
195	May 8, 1995	Carol Kane

No.	Original release date	Guest(s)
196	May 9, 1995	Arianna Huffington

No.	Original release date	Guest(s)
197	May 10, 1995	Jeff Foxworthy

No.	Original release date	Guest(s)
198	May 11, 1995	Duran Duran

No.	Original release date	Guest(s)
199	May 15, 1995	Kathy Ireland

No.	Original release date	Guest(s)
200	May 16, 1995	Michael Feinstein

No.	Original release date	Guest(s)
201	May 17, 1995	Julianna Margulies

No.	Original release date	Guest(s)
202	May 18, 1995	Little Richard

No.	Original release date	Guest(s)
203	May 22, 1995	John Tesh

No.	Original release date	Guest(s)
204	May 23, 1995	Richard Bey

No.	Original release date	Guest(s)
205	May 24, 1995	Patti LaBelle

=== June ===
No.	Original release date	Guest(s)
206	June 5, 1995	Donna Summer

No.	Original release date	Guest(s)
207	June 6, 1995	Roy Firestone

No.	Original release date	Guest(s)
208	June 7, 1995	Susan Powter

No.	Original release date	Guest(s)
209	June 8, 1995	Clarence Clemons

No.	Original release date	Guest(s)
210	June 12, 1995	Rosie O'Donnell (guest host); Janeane Garofalo

No.	Original release date	Guest(s)
211	June 13, 1995	Rosie O'Donnell (guest host); RuPaul

No.	Original release date	Guest(s)
212	June 14, 1995	Rosie O'Donnell (guest host); Cathy Moriarty

No.	Original release date	Guest(s)
213	June 15, 1995	Rosie O'Donnell (guest host); Bill Pullman

=== July ===
No.	Original release date	Guest(s)
214	July 10, 1995	Eric Bogosian

No.	Original release date	Guest(s)
215	July 11, 1995	Carl Reiner

No.	Original release date	Guest(s)
216	July 12, 1995	Howie Mandel

No.	Original release date	Guest(s)
217	July 13, 1995	Chris Columbus

No.	Original release date	Guest(s)
218	July 17, 1995	Carrie Fisher

No.	Original release date	Guest(s)
219	July 18, 1995	Harry Shearer

No.	Original release date	Guest(s)
220	July 19, 1995	Roger Corman

No.	Original release date	Guest(s)
221	July 20, 1995	Alexandra Wentworth

No.	Original release date	Guest(s)
222	July 25, 1995	Michael Moore

No.	Original release date	Guest(s)
223	July 26, 1995	Bill McCuddy

No.	Original release date	Guest(s)
224	July 27, 1995	Danny Glover

No.	Original release date	Guest(s)
225	July 31, 1995	Mickey Spillane

=== August ===
No.	Original release date	Guest(s)
226	August 1, 1995	Doug E. Doug

No.	Original release date	Guest(s)
227	August 2, 1995	Deborah Norville

No.	Original release date	Guest(s)
228	August 3, 1995	Daniel Stern

No.	Original release date	Guest(s)
229	August 7, 1995	Paula Poundstone

No.	Original release date	Guest(s)
230	August 8, 1995	Kathy Najimy

No.	Original release date	Guest(s)
231	August 9, 1995	Irwin Winkler

No.	Original release date	Guest(s)
232	August 10, 1995	Richard Lewis

No.	Original release date	Guest(s)
233	August 15, 1995	Christopher Lambert

No.	Original release date	Guest(s)
234	August 16, 1995	Paula Abdul

No.	Original release date	Guest(s)
235	August 17, 1995	Dee Dee Myers

No.	Original release date	Guest(s)
236	August 30, 1995	Reggie Miller

No.	Original release date	Guest(s)
237	August 31, 1995	Karen Duffy

=== September ===
No.	Original release date	Guest(s)
238	September 4, 1995	Clive Barker

No.	Original release date	Guest(s)
239	September 5, 1995	Robert Townsend

No.	Original release date	Guest(s)
240	September 6, 1995	Gail O'Grady

No.	Original release date	Guest(s)
241	September 7, 1995	David Alan Grier

No.	Original release date	Guest(s)
242	September 11, 1995	Famke Janssen

No.	Original release date	Guest(s)
243	September 12, 1995	Terry Murphy

No.	Original release date	Guest(s)
244	September 14, 1995	Daisy Fuentes

No.	Original release date	Guest(s)
245	September 18, 1995	Larry Miller

No.	Original release date	Guest(s)
246	September 19, 1995	Noah Wyle

No.	Original release date	Guest(s)
247	September 20, 1995	Lea Thompson

No.	Original release date	Guest(s)
248	September 21, 1995	Matt LeBlanc

No.	Original release date	Guest(s)
249	September 25, 1995	Jeff Greenfield

No.	Original release date	Guest(s)
250	September 26, 1995	Drew Carey

No.	Original release date	Guest(s)
251	September 27, 1995	Jody Watley

=== October ===
No.	Original release date	Guest(s)
252	October 2, 1995	Sophie B. Hawkins

No.	Original release date	Guest(s)
253	October 3, 1995	Stephen J. Cannell

No.	Original release date	Guest(s)
254	October 4, 1995	Joey Lawrence

No.	Original release date	Guest(s)
255	October 5, 1995	John Larroquette

No.	Original release date	Guest(s)
256	October 9, 1995	Dave Foley

No.	Original release date	Guest(s)
257	October 10, 1995	David Sanborn

No.	Original release date	Guest(s)
258	October 11, 1995	Yasmine Bleeth

No.	Original release date	Guest(s)
259	October 12, 1995	Bill Maher

No.	Original release date	Guest(s)
260	October 23, 1995	Garry Marshall

No.	Original release date	Guest(s)
261	October 24, 1995	Kim Coles

No.	Original release date	Guest(s)
262	October 25, 1995	Nancy McKeon

No.	Original release date	Guest(s)
263	October 26, 1995	Richie Sambora

No.	Original release date	Guest(s)
264	October 30, 1995	Marlin Fitzwater

No.	Original release date	Guest(s)
265	October 31, 1995	Cynthia Stevenson

=== November ===
No.	Original release date	Guest(s)
266	November 1, 1995	Boy George

No.	Original release date	Guest(s)
267	November 2, 1995	Steve Guttenberg

No.	Original release date	Guest(s)
268	November 6, 1995	Jonathan Pryce

No.	Original release date	Guest(s)
269	November 7, 1995	Paula Poundstone

No.	Original release date	Guest(s)
270	November 8, 1995	Dave Thomas & Tom Poston

No.	Original release date	Guest(s)
271	November 9, 1995	Kadeem Hardison

No.	Original release date	Guest(s)
272	November 13, 1995	Allen & Albert Hughes

No.	Original release date	Guest(s)
273	November 14, 1995	Heart

No.	Original release date	Guest(s)
274	November 15, 1995	Tori Spelling

No.	Original release date	Guest(s)
275	November 16, 1995	Jonathan Silverman

No.	Original release date	Guest(s)
276	November 20, 1995	Pierre Salinger

No.	Original release date	Guest(s)
277	November 21, 1995	Kevin Pollak

No.	Original release date	Guest(s)
278	November 22, 1995	Arianna Huffington & Harry Shearer

No.	Original release date	Guest(s)
279	November 23, 1995	LL Cool J

No.	Original release date	Guest(s)
280	November 27, 1995	Nancy Travis

No.	Original release date	Guest(s)
281	November 28, 1995	Robert Klein

No.	Original release date	Guest(s)
282	November 29, 1995	John Larroquette

No.	Original release date	Guest(s)
283	November 30, 1995	P.J. O'Rourke

=== December ===
No.	Original release date	Guest(s)
284	December 11, 1995	George Hamilton

No.	Original release date	Guest(s)
285	December 12, 1995	Ann Magnuson

No.	Original release date	Guest(s)
286	December 13, 1995	Peter Max

No.	Original release date	Guest(s)
287	December 19, 1995	Ray Davies

No.	Original release date	Guest(s)
288	December 26, 1995	Lori Loughlin

No.	Original release date	Guest(s)
289	December 27, 1995	Suzanne Somers
