= Bruno Valverde Cota =

Portuguese author and entrepreneur

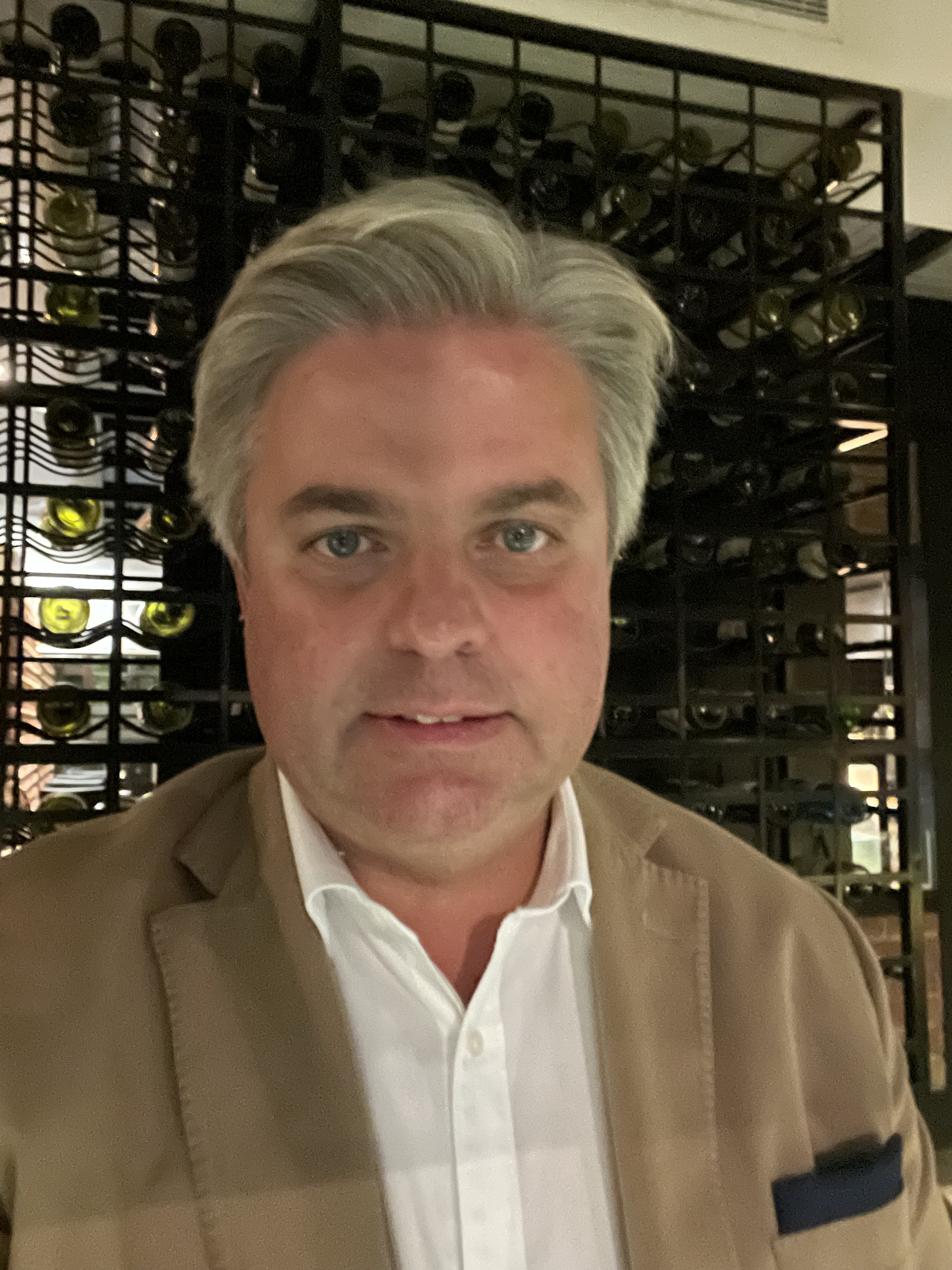
- Born: July 14, 1974 (age 52); Portugal
- Occupations: Entrepreneur, business executive
- Website: https://www.optimistic.pt/

Bruno Valverde Cota (born 14 July 1974) is a Portuguese author and entrepreneur.

== Early life and education ==
Valverde Cota was born in Leiria on 14 July 1974 and spent most of his childhood and adolescence in Alcobaça. He is Catholic.

He holds a PhD in Management from the University of Évora and a master's degree in Business Management, specialising in International Trade, from Lusíada University of Lisbon.

== Career ==
Valverde Cota is the president of the Optimistic Group. His career spans academia, publishing and international trade promotion.

He has published opinion articles in several Portuguese newspapers, including Jornal de Negócios, Diário Económico and Diário de Notícias.

He is the author, co-author or coordinator of more than 15 books in the areas of marketing, strategy and communication. He has also directed advanced programmes in marketing and leadership at several Portuguese universities.

=== Business Life ===
In 2012, he decided to “practise what he teaches” and became a full-time entrepreneur, after more than 15 years working in the banking sector, with activities related to the export of goods and equipment, with a primary focus on international markets. Since 2019, as an industrialist, he has stood out worldwide with the OPTIMISTIC brand in the production of rotary equipment, compressors, fans and blowers, having anticipated the application of this equipment for hydrogen, with international projects.

=== Associative Life ===
He was a representative for Alentejo of the Poland–Portugal Chamber of Commerce; a member of the Board of CLACI – Luso-Argentine Chamber of Commerce and Industry; a founding member of CCITPRC – Chamber of Commerce, Industry and Tourism Portugal–Czech Republic, having served on the Board for the 2017–2019 term; and a founding member and the 1st President of the Board (term ended on 9 May 2023) of CCLR – Luso-Russian Chamber of Commerce and Industry, now CCIPCEI – Chamber of Commerce and Industry Portugal–Community of Independent States. Before the current conflict in Ukraine, he was also one of the promoters of the 1st, 2nd and 3rd Russia–Portugal Business Forum.

In February 2020, he was appointed honorary consul of the Russian Federation in the district of Faro. His appointment ceased to produce effects in January 2023 after the Portuguese authorities reconsidered the framework underlying the acceptance of honorary consular representations connected to the Russian Federation following the outbreak of the war in Ukraine.

== Selected publications ==
- Banking Marketing (2000), Lusíada University Press
- The Emergence of Banking Marketing (2005, 11th edition), Lusíada University Press
- Services Marketing Manual (2006, 12th edition), Lusíada University Press
- Innovative Marketing (2007), Católica Editora (co-author: Paulo G. Marcos)
- Marketing Research: Principles and Applications (2007), Lusíada University Press (coordinator)
- Advertising and Markets: A New Approach to Business Communication (2007, 11th edition), Lusíada University Press
- Database Marketing: A 1:1 Marketing Tool (2008), Lusíada University Press (co-author: Henrique Zarco Cota)
- Military Strategies: From Plan to Action (2008, 11th edition), Coisas de Ler (coordinator)
- The Power of Marketing in Decision Making (2011), Bnomics (co-author: Carla Rebelo)

== Personal life ==
He is married to Svetlana Bilous Cota, who was born in the former Soviet Union, and he has three children.
