= Jenna Lee =

American journalist

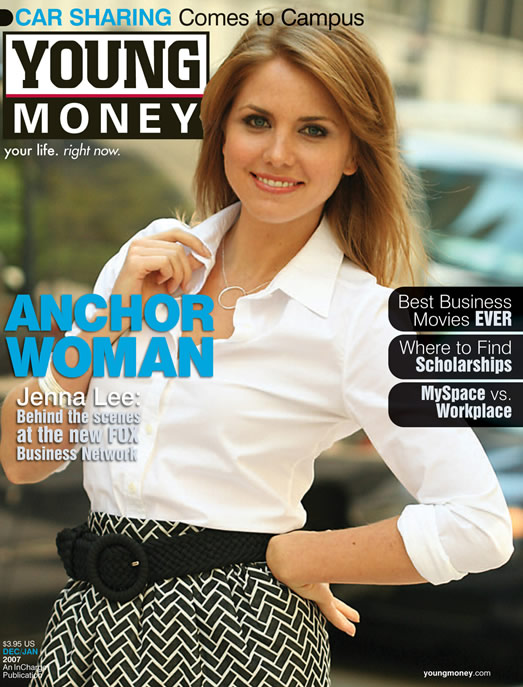
- Lee in 2007
- Born: May 30, 1980 (age 46)
- Education: University of California, Santa Barbara; Columbia University
- Occupations: Journalist, television news presenter
- Employer: Fox Entertainment Group
- Spouse: Leif Babin (m. 2011)
- Children: 3
- Parent(s): Janice and Bob Lee
- Relatives: Zac Lee (brother)

Jennifer Anne "Jenna" Lee (born May 30, 1980) is an American journalist and former anchor on Fox News, where she co-hosted Happening Now with Jon Scott. Lee had previously co-anchored Fox Business' early-morning business news program, Fox Business Morning, with Connell McShane.

== Early life and education ==
Lee, a San Francisco native, was born to Janice and Bob Lee, a former National Football League quarterback. Her brother, Zac Lee, was also a professional quarterback. Lee's grandfather, Paul Kern Lee, was a war correspondent for the Associated Press in San Francisco.

Lee attended college at the University of California, Santa Barbara, where she played collegiate softball for the UC Santa Barbara Gauchos during the 1999 season. She graduated in 2002 with a B.A. in English and global studies. She later attended Columbia University Graduate School of Journalism, graduating in 2005 with a master's degree.

== Career ==
=== Career beginnings ===
After graduating from UC Santa Barbara, Lee worked from 2002 to 2004 at Marina Times, a San Francisco community newspaper, as a freelance reporter in her spare time. Later, she enrolled at Columbia University, where she worked at NY1 and did freelance writing for Forbes.com. She left NY1 and joined Forbes full-time.

While at Forbes, Lee tried to orchestrate a permanent move in front of the camera. Using some on-camera work she compiled from her time at Forbes, she was hired by Fox Business Network.

=== Fox Business Network ===
Lee was hired by FOX News Chairman & CEO Roger Ailes in 2007. With Nicole Petallides, the duo were the original anchors of Fox Business Morning on Fox Business Network when the channel made its debut on October 15, 2007.

FOX later added Lee as a contributor to Money for Breakfast and as an anchor to the web-only FoxBusiness.com Live Morning Edition, which launched in February 2009. Upon the cancellation of Money for Breakfast in December 2009, Lee gained a role on Imus in the Morning, the show that took its time slot.

The last airing of Fox Business Morning was in May 2010, after which it was replaced by Best of Imus as the lead-in to Imus in the Morning.

=== Transition to Fox News Channel ===
Lee left Fox Business Network in July 2010 and joined Fox News Channel, where she replaced Jane Skinner as Jon Scott's co-anchor on Happening Now. She was the first personality to go from Fox Business Network to Fox News Channel.

On June 2, 2017, Lee announced on Happening Now that she was leaving Fox News immediately to pursue other projects and opportunities. In 2018, Lee launched the SmartHer News, which she described as a "fact based, nonpartisan" digital news platform.

== Personal life ==
On July 3, 2011, Lee married Lieutenant Commander Leif Babin, a former Navy SEAL officer, in Wimberley, Texas. Babin, a recipient of a Silver Star, a Bronze Star, and a Purple Heart for service in Anbar Province, Iraq, in 2006, is the son of US Congressman Brian Babin. The couple met at the 2008 Navy SEAL Warrior Fund dinner held in New York City at the Waldorf Astoria New York. She has stated that after meeting Babin she gained a better understanding of life for military families and the impact of war.

Lee and Babin have three children. Through social media she announced she now lives in Texas.

Lee appeared in the October 2009 edition of Cosmopolitan with an accompanying photo spread detailing her wardrobe strategy.
