= Económico TV =

Defunct Portuguese television channel

ETV
- Country: Portugal
- Broadcast area: Portugal; Angola; Mozambique

Programming
- Picture format: 16:9 576i (SDTV); 16:9 1080i (HDTV)

Ownership
- Owner: Ongoing Strategy Investments

History
- Launched: May 6, 2010; 15 years ago
- Closed: October 20, 2016; 8 years ago

Links
- Website: Económico TV

ETV (Económico TV) was a private Portuguese digital cable business news television channel that is owned by the same group of the Portuguese newspaper Diário Económico and Brazilian Brasil Econômico (from the Ongoing Strategy Investment group). It is available on cable, satellite and Internet streaming. The channel was launched in 2010 as an exclusive in Portugal to NOS, one year later it became available on MEO platform.

== History ==
The channel was announced in July 2009 with a cost of €2,5 million to €3 million, according to its director and future prime minister António Costa. The format was defined to be a midway between Bloomberg TV and SIC Notícias. In August, a tentative October launch date was announced, with its license being greenlighted. The launch of the channel was delayed several times, first to late November then finally on 6 May 2010.

Within its first few months on air, the channel made it to ZAP in Angola, which, as of August 2010, was set to enter Mozambique.

On 16 February 2011, broadcasts began on MEO, in SD on channel 200 and in HD on channel 16.

The channel ended its broadcasts on 20 October 2016, due to the suspension of its website and the insolvency of its parent company. In 2019, Ongoing sold the channel's brand from its bankrupt assets for €100.
