= Cody Willard =

American writer

- Born: August 31, 1972 (age 54); Ruidoso, New Mexico, U.S.
- Education: University of New Mexico
- Occupations: Hedge fund manager Television anchor Investor musician

Cody Willard (born August 31, 1972, in Ruidoso, New Mexico), is an American investor, television anchor and current hedge fund manager.

He is the publisher of a subscription-based investment newsletter TradingWithCody.com and the author of the #1 Amazon best-seller, "Everything You Need to Know About Investing" as well as several other books.

He was an anchor on the Fox Business Network, where he was the co-host of the long-time #1-rated show on the network, Fox Business Happy Hour, was the Wall Street Correspondent for The Tonight Show with Jay Leno and was Larry's Kudlow's sidekick on CNBC's Kudlow & Company. He has had a featured investment column for The Financial Times, Marketwatch, the WSJ, TheStreet.com. Willard also served as an adjunct professor at Seton Hall University where he taught class called "Revolutionomics" focused on technology, business and politics.

He began his career at Oppenheimer & Co. in 1996 (after his first job in New York City, a barista at Starbucks) and was chief analyst at Visual Radio, a technology venture capital fund, and vice president of wholesale operations at Broadview Networks, a telecommunications company.

== Personal life ==
Willard grew up in Ruidoso, New Mexico with actor Neil Patrick Harris, who later invested in his friend's hedge fund and the two remain close friends and business partners. Willard earned a bachelor's degree in economics at the University of New Mexico, where he played basketball as a walk-on.

He is a musician who has played backup guitar for Neil Sedaka, Lorrie Morgan and others, and is a songwriter and producer with the indie rock band The Muddy Souls.
