= Scottie Nell Hughes =

American news anchor and commentator

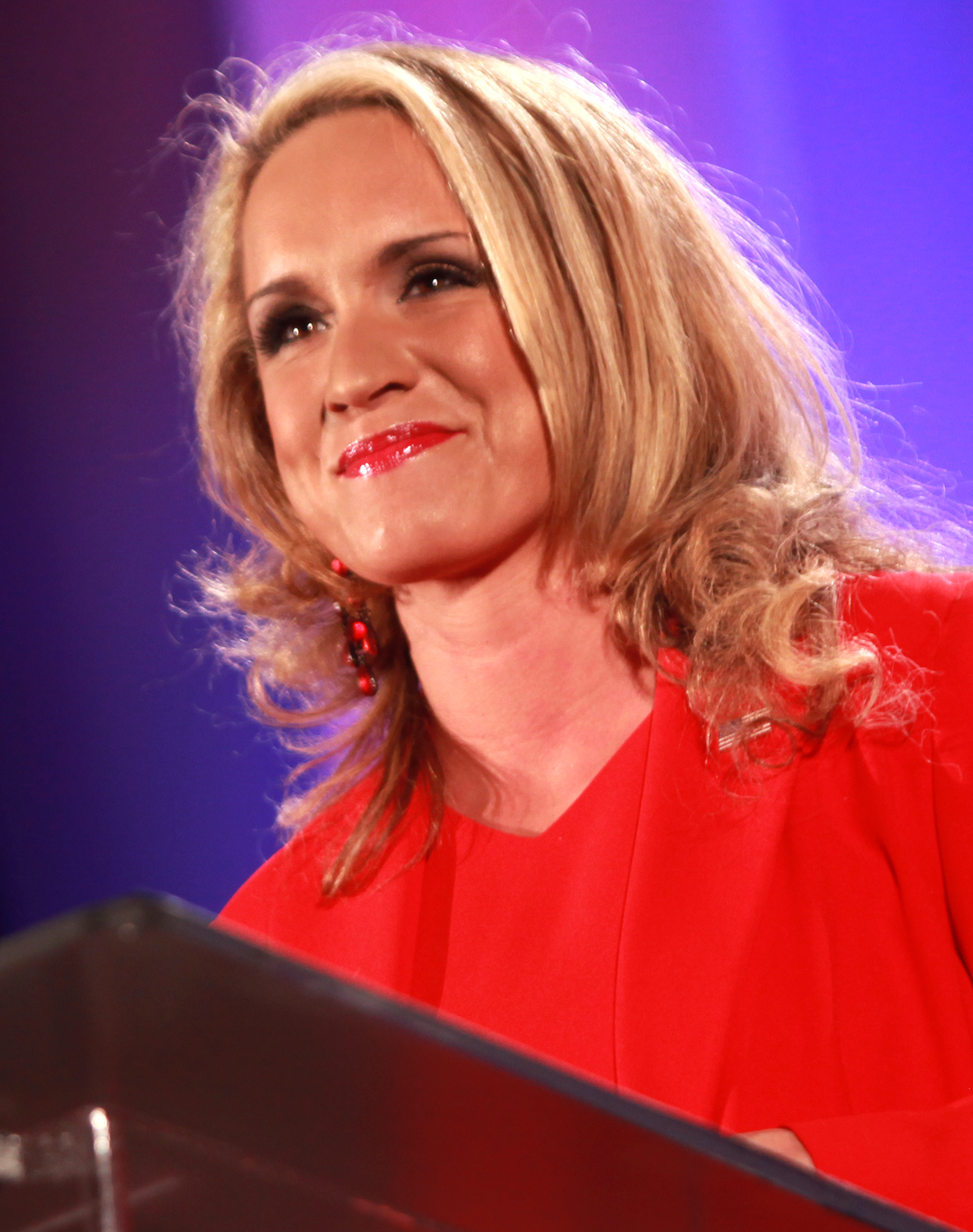
- Hughes in 2014
- Born: June 21, 1980 (age 46)
- Political party: Republican
- Spouse: Chris Hughes
- Children: 2

Scottie Nell Hughes (born 21 June 1980) is an American journalist, news anchor and political commentator who is employed by RT. She was a paid CNN commentator during the 2016 presidential election, often speaking in support of then-candidate Donald Trump.

Hughes joined RT America as a full-time anchor in September 2018 and was the host of a daily news show News Views Hughes. After losing the majority of its cable and satellite coverage following the Russian invasion of Ukraine, RT America ceased operations on March 3, 2022.

== Biography ==
Hughes graduated magna cum laude with a broadcast communications/political science degree from the University of Tennessee at Martin. Her first network TV appearance was on CNN's Piers Morgan Live, where she defended the right to keep and bear arms; her brother Cliff had been shot and killed before she was born.

Hughes began her career as an executive producer on the Steve Gill Show in Nashville, Tennessee. With an established radio career, she went on to take producing positions with The Rusty Humphries Show, The Michael Berry Show, The Mark Skoda Show, and many others. She also was in the first group of radio talk show hosts sent by the Department of Defense to travel to the front lines of Operation Enduring Freedom in Iraq and Kuwait, as well as the detention facilities at Guantánamo Bay, Cuba. She was news director of the Tea Party News Network and served as a political commentator for CNN until her contract expired in January 2017.

On 18 September 2017, Hughes sued Fox News, asserting she had been raped by Fox Business Network host Charles Payne. He denied the accusation, was suspended by the network pending an investigation into his conduct, then reinstated after the investigation was completed. Hughes said her two-year sexual relationship with Payne was coerced, and that she believed it would help her obtain a permanent position at the network. Her appearances were drastically reduced after she ended the relationship in 2015 and reported Payne to Fox. She sued Fox for retaliation for reduction of her appearances on Fox; the suit was settled, the details not publicized.

Her book, Roar: The New Conservative Woman Speaks Out, was published in 2014.

In a live interview broadcast on CNN the day before the 2016 presidential election, she confused the word "Molotov" with mazel tov, a Jewish expression of congratulations or good luck, when she stated that a video by rap music artist and Hillary Clinton supporter Jay-Z begins "with a crowd throwing mazel tov cocktails."
