= Semanário Económico (newspaper) =

Portuguese business newspaper

- Type: Weekly business newspaper
- Publisher: Ongoing Media
- Founded: 16 January 1987
- Ceased publication: August 2009
- Language: Portuguese
- Headquarters: Lisbon
- Sister newspapers: Diário Económico

Semanário Económico was a weekly business newspaper published in Lisbon, Portugal, from 1987 to 2009.

== History and profile ==
Semanário Económico was first published on 16 January 1987. It had its headquarters in Lisbon. The paper was owned by Ongoing media, which bought it from the holding Económica. In the mid-2000s the paper was part of Media Capital.

Semanário Económico was mostly read in Greater Lisbon and Centre of Portugal. In 2007 the paper had a circulation of 9,000 copies. In 2008 the paper sold 9,954 copies. In August 2009 the paper was renamed as Weekend Económico.
