= Lori Rothman =

- Born: July 9, 1973 (age 52); Boston
- Occupation: Fox Business Network FBN

Lori Rothman (born July 9, 1973) joined Fox Business (FBN) in September 2010 as an anchor.

== Early life and education ==
Rothman received a Bachelor of Arts degree in broadcast journalism and history from the University of Southern California.

== Career ==
Prior to joining (FBN), Rothman served as a dayside anchor at Bloomberg Television covering markets, corporate earnings, and the global economic recession. While there, Rothman interviewed major financial newsmakers including: BlackRock Vice Chairman Bob Doll; Rochdale Securities analyst Dick Bove; billionaire investor Wilbur Ross and former Chair of the Council of Economic Advisers Christina Romer. Prior to that, she reported from the New York Stock Exchange for Bloomberg Television's syndicated reports.

Before joining Bloomberg, Rothman anchored morning news programming at WPTZ-TV, the NBC affiliate in Burlington/Plattsburgh, where she was recognized with an Associated Press award for coverage of flooding in the region. She also served as a weekend anchor for CBS affiliate KREX-TV in Grand Junction, Colorado and as a reporter for CW affiliate KJUD-TV in Juneau, Alaska.

Rothman has also been a regular panelist on the Fox News program Red Eye w/ Greg Gutfeld.
