= Stuart Varney =

British-American TV presenter (born 1948)

- Born: Stuart A. Varney; 7 July 1948 (age 78); Derby, Derbyshire, England
- Citizenship: United Kingdom; United States
- Education: London School of Economics
- Occupations: Talk show host; political commentator

Stuart A. Varney (born 7 July 1948) is a British-American talk show host and conservative political commentator who works for Fox News and the Fox Business Network. Born in the United Kingdom, he worked as a journalist before joining Fox News in January 2004 as a business contributor, such as on Your World with Neil Cavuto.

== Early life ==
Varney was born in Derby, Derbyshire, England. After secondary school, Varney spent a year working for VSO in Nairobi, Kenya, before taking his degree at the London School of Economics and then travelling the world for several years before ending up in Hong Kong.

== Journalism career ==
After arriving in Hong Kong, he became a reporter for Radio Hong Kong. During this time, he would help cover various events and had a short stint working as a voice actor for a dubbing firm founded by Matthew Oram, a fellow Radio Hong Kong broadcaster. In 1975, he moved to California where he began a career as a broadcast anchor at KEMO-TV (now KOFY-TV) in San Francisco. He was then recruited to join the Manhattan bureau of the newly formed 24-hour news network CNN, which launched on June 1, 1980. He hosted the CNN shows Business Day, Business Asia, and Moneyline with Willow Bay. In 2001, he left CNN to host CNBC's "Wall Street Journal Editorial Board with Stuart Varney."

He joined Fox News's business team in January 2004, and joined Fox Business Network as an anchor when the network launched in October 2007.

=== Fox Business Network ===
Varney currently co-hosts Varney & Co. on the Fox Business Network, which airs from 9:00 a.m. to noon ET every weekday. The show is also co-hosted by Lauren Simonetti, Madison Alworth, Lydia Hu, Susan Li and Ashley Webster. He is also a regular panel member on the Fox Business program Cashin' In.

Varney has appeared on and guest-hosted "Your World with Neil Cavuto."

On August 30, 2023, Fox Business announced that Varney would be a moderator of the second GOP Primary Debate alongside Dana Perino.

=== Notable commentaries ===
In an interview on June 5, 2013 on Fox News, Varney said "We hand down $79 billion dollars every January on these so-called poor people." "You’re not being mean to poor people?" host Gretchen Carlson asked Varney, who responded, "I am. I am being mean to poor people. Frankly, I am." This exchange of words gained brief popularity when it was cited on The Daily Show with Jon Stewart on Comedy Central, with journalists from The Washington Post reporting on his comments afterwards.

On the July 19, 2011 edition of Fox News' Your World with Neil Cavuto, Varney criticized the view that America's poor are "starving and living in squalor," citing a Heritage Foundation report on how the ownership of household appliances demonstrates how well-off America's poor really are. Varney concluded by saying, "The image we have of poor people as starving and living in squalor really is not accurate. Many of them have things; what they lack is the richness of spirit. That's my opinion."

In 2013 Varney generated controversy for his commentary on Pope Francis, who had criticized the wealth gap and denounced unfettered capitalism as a system which "rules rather than serves." Varney stated, "I go to church to save my soul. It’s got nothing to do with my vote. Pope Francis has linked the two. He has offered direct criticism of a specific political system. He has characterized, negatively, that system. I think he wants to influence my politics."

In a December 2018 interview, Republican congressman Louie Gohmert repeated a false conspiracy theory about George Soros that he "turned on fellow Jews and helped take the property that they owned." Varney did not address Gohmert's comments, moving the segment on. Varney later distanced himself from the remarks, calling them "unsubstantiated and false allegations".

== Personal life ==
Varney has lived in the United States since 1975. In November 2015, Varney became an American citizen.

He has six children and eleven grandchildren.
