= Zac Lee =

American football player (born 1987)

No. 5
- Position: Quarterback

Personal information
- Born: April 26, 1987 (age 39); San Francisco, California, U.S.
- Listed height: 6 ft 2 in (1.88 m)
- Listed weight: 215 lb (98 kg)

Career information
- High school: San Francisco (CA) St. Ignatius College Prep
- College: Nebraska
- NFL draft: 2011: undrafted

Career history
- Seattle Seahawks (2011)*; Las Vegas Locomotives (2011–2012)
- * Offseason or practice squad member only

Zac Lee (born April 26, 1987) is an American former professional football quarterback. He was signed by the Seattle Seahawks as an undrafted free agent in 2011. He played college football at Nebraska. He is the son of former NFL quarterback, Bob Lee, and the younger brother of former network news anchor, Jenna Lee.

== Early life ==
Lee starred in both football and baseball at St. Ignatius College Preparatory in San Francisco and graduated in 2005. He was a three-year all-league quarterback in high school, but focused much of his time on baseball, limiting his Division I football scholarship offers out of high school. Lee chose Nebraska after also receiving strong recruiting interest from Oklahoma, Fresno State and Mississippi State among others. He was inducted into the San Francisco Prep Hall of Fame for football in 2011. Lee's father, Bob Lee, an NFL quarterback and 1963 Lowell High School graduate, are the first father-son combination to be honored by the San Francisco Prep Hall of Fame.

== College career ==
Lee played two seasons at the City College of San Francisco. He had a standout 2006 campaign, with more than 3,400 passing yards and 35 touchdowns, while completing 64 percent of his passes. Lee's performance led City College of San Francisco to a 10–2 record and an appearance in the California junior college title game. The City College of San Francisco offense averaged nearly 40 points per game with Lee at QB. Lee was ranked as the nation's top junior college quarterback by Rivals.com, Scout.com and SuperPrep Magazine before choosing to play at Nebraska. He redshirted his first year at Nebraska in 2007. In 2008, he completed one pass for five yards and rushed for 17 yards. In 2009, Lee passed for 2,143 yds, completing 59% of his passes and rushing for 171 yards. He started 12 games for the Cornhuskers in 2009. By season's end, Lee had guided his team to a Holiday Bowl win and a #14 national ranking. In 2010, he began the season as the starter but was eventually beat out by redshirt freshman Taylor Martinez. In his three years at Nebraska, Lee played in 21 games, throwing for 2,250 yards and 14 touchdowns.

== Professional career ==
=== Seattle Seahawks ===
Lee was signed by the Seattle Seahawks as an undrafted free agent following the end of the NFL lockout in 2011. He was cut one week later.

=== Las Vegas Locomotives ===
In 2012, he was signed by the Las Vegas Locomotives.
