= Dennis Strigl =

American corporate executive

- Born: Dennis F. Strigl; April 13, 1946 (age 79)
- Education: Canisius College, Fairleigh Dickinson University
- Occupations: corporate executive, telecommunications industry
- Known for: CEO, Verizon Wireless (2007–2009)
- Notable work: founding member, Cellular Telecommunications & Internet Association
- Spouse: Amanda Strigl
- Children: 5

Dennis F. Strigl (born April 13, 1946) is an American business executive. He is the retired president, chief executive officer, and chief operating officer of Verizon Wireless, responsible for operations at Verizon Telecom, Verizon Wireless and Verizon Business. He was appointed on January 1, 2007, and worked for Verizon for about three years until his retirement on December 31, 2009.

== Career ==
Strigl was the lead executive in charge of integrating Verizon Wireless when that company was formed in April 2000, by combining the domestic wireless operations of Bell Atlantic, Vodafone AirTouch and GTE. Previously, he served as president and CEO of Bell Atlantic Mobile and group president and CEO of Bell Atlantic Global Wireless, the company's domestic and international wireless portfolio.

Upon his retirement from Verizon on December 31, 2009, Strigl served in the telecommunications industry for over 40 years. His telecommunications career began in 1968 with New York Telephone Company. After this, he held positions at AT&T and Wisconsin Telephone, Illinois Bell, before becoming vice president of American Bell, Inc. In 1984 he became president of Ameritech Mobile Communications. Strigl launched the nation's first cellular telephone network in Chicago, resulting in the Cellular Industry Achievement Award, which he was given for engineering advancement and pioneering in marketing programs. Applied Data Research, Inc., an Ameritech subsidiary was the next company in which he served for as president and chief executive officer.

Starting in 1989, Strigl served as vice president-product management for Bell Atlantic Network Services, followed by his later position as vice president-operations and chief operating officer and a member of New Jersey Bell's board of directors. He was named president and CEO of Bell Atlantic Mobile Systems in 1991, and oversaw its merger with Metro Mobile CTS. In 1995, Bell Atlantic Mobile and Nynex Mobile merged. Strigl took over the company as CEO and president.

Strigl was a founding member and served on the board of directors of the Cellular Telecommunications & Internet Association, the national industry association based in Washington, D.C., for many years. From 1996 to 1997 he served as the chairman of the association. He was inducted into The Wireless Hall of Fame in 2004 and received Wireless Week's Lifetime Achievement Award in 2012.

He serves on the boards of directors of Anadigics Inc., PNC Financial Services Group and PNC Bank. In September 2015 he ventured into a technology start-up, Smartiply, Inc. (www.smartiply.com) in the area of Fog Networks and Internet of Things, where he serves as a board member and chairman of the board. He is a former director of Kodak, Nokia and Tellabs.

=== Academia ===
Strigl holds a degree in business administration from Canisius College in Buffalo, New York (where he served as a trustee and as chairman of the board of trustees) and an MBA from Fairleigh Dickinson University in Rutherford, New Jersey. He received an honorary degree, Doctor of Humane Letters, in May 2011 from Canisius College and in May 2016 from Fairleigh Dickinson University.

He has been a visiting professor at Princeton University since 2013 where he teaches an undergraduate level course in leadership. He is a licensed commercial pilot. Since retiring from Verizon he has written a management book and spoken to numerous groups on management leadership. He has been a frequent guest on the FOX News Channel, FOX Business, CNBC and MSNBC.
