= Neil Rosen =

American entertainment critic

Neil Rosen is an American entertainment critic and journalist, who is based in New York City. Currently, he is the entertainment critic for CUNY TV and PBS, is a frequent on-air contributor to The Today Show (Weekend Today In NY on WNBC) and can be heard regularly on Sirius XM Radio. He is the host, creator, and producer of the popular, Emmy-nominated national TV roundtable movie critic show “Talking Pictures With Neil Rosen.”

He was formerly the entertainment critic/reporter for NY1.

== Career ==
For 24 years Rosen was the entertainment critic/reporter for NY1, having served in that capacity since the station went on the air in 1992.

Rosen is a frequent on-air contributor to The Today Show (Weekend Today In NY on WNBC), CNN, MSNBC, USA Network, A&E, Bravo, American Movie Classics, and can also be heard regularly on Sirius XM Radio and BBC Radio.

From 2012 to 2017, Rosen hosted NY1's nationally syndicated roundtable movie review series "Talking Pictures on Demand" with Bill McCuddy and Lisa Rosman.

In August 2015, Rosen and McCuddy launched the "Sitting Around Talking Movies" podcast along with Bill Bregoli.

In 2018, Rosen became the entertainment critic for CUNY TV and PBS, which are the current homes of “Talking Pictures With Neil Rosen." He also hosts movie oriented segments for CUNY TV's monthly series "Arts in the City" and "Nonstop New York."

He is the Chairman of the NY Chapter of the Broadcast Film Critics Association, the largest film critics organization in the United States and Canada, representing more than 200 television, radio and online critics.

Rosen was a regular writer for The New York Post where he showcased his interviews with movie, television and music stars, directors, screenwriters and producers.

His celebrity interviews have included such notables as Arnold Schwarzenegger, Paul McCartney, Clint Eastwood, Luciano Pavorotti, Robert De Niro, Madonna, Tom Cruise, Leonardo DiCaprio, Beyonce and Justin Timberlake, to name a few.

He hosted the popular weekly radio program “The Movie Show With Neil Rosen” on WABC Radio, where listeners get the opportunity to “call in” and “talk back” to a critic. He also served as WABC's entertainment reviewer.

For six years, Neil was the movie and theater critic for WNCN Radio, America's #1 classical radio station, and has been the late-night reviewer for WWOR-TV. He was the in-flight movie critic for The Travel Channel and the entertainment critic for WNBC Radio, Centerseat.com, WNEW Radio and WLIG-TV.

Rosen taught a popular film lecture series at The New School For Social Research. The course examined some of the greatest movies that were ever made in New York City and featured guest stars from each film.

He is the author of several comprehensive movie catalogs and has written the liner notes to thousands of films on DVD.

Quotes from his movie reviews can be found daily in hundreds of newspapers and magazines across the US as well as in many national TV spots for numerous films.

Neil has written for such companies as Columbia Pictures, MGM and Twentieth Century Fox, and his work has appeared in Cosmopolitan, TV Guide, American Film Magazine, and Playbill.

== Awards ==
Rosen has won two Emmy Awards for entertainment journalism. He was also nominated for seven additional Emmy Awards for his celebrity interviews, his film reviews, and for his entertainment reporting.
