= Charles Payne (television personality) =

American journalist (born 1962)

- Born: Charles V. Payne; November 15, 1962 (age 63)
- Education: Minot State University; Central Texas College
- Occupations: News anchor; TV personality
- Spouse: Yvonne Payne
- Children: 2

Charles V. Payne (born 15 November 1962) is an American Fox Business Network financial journalist and host of Fox's Making Money with Charles Payne.

== Early life and education ==
At 17 years old, he enlisted in the United States Air Force, serving as a security policeman stationed at Minot Air Force Base in Minot, North Dakota. Payne attended Minot State University and Central Texas College while in the service.

== Career ==
=== Finance industry ===
Payne began his career on Wall Street as an analyst at E. F. Hutton in 1985. Payne is the chief executive officer and principal financial analyst of Wall Street Strategies, a stock market research firm he founded in 1991.

In 1999, Payne settled with the SEC over a complaint alleging that, on at least eight occasions, Wall Street Strategies recommended that its clients purchase members' stock through recorded messages on its telephonic stock recommendation service. The complaint also alleged that Payne failed to disclose that he received payments from members to promote members' stock. Without admitting or denying the alleged violations, Payne consented to the entry of a permanent injunction against violations of Section 17(b) of the Securities Act of 1933. In addition, Payne agreed to pay a civil penalty of $25,000.

In 2007, Payne released his first book titled Be Smart, Act Fast, Get Rich: Your Game Plan for Getting It Right in the Stock Market. He has made several appearances on C-SPAN.

=== Fox Business ===
In 2007, Payne joined Fox Business as a contributor. In 2014, he became the host of Making Money with Charles Payne.

In June 2019, Payne claimed, "When President Obama was elected, the market crashed … Trump was up 9%, President Obama was down 14.8% and President Bush was down almost 4%. There is an instant reaction on Wall Street." PolitiFact described the claim as "mostly false", noting that while the numbers put forth are completely correct some experts dismiss the causal claims put forth by Payne, and instead attribute the market crash to broader economic forces and long-term trends.

In July 2017, Payne was suspended by Fox Business pending an investigation after a former network guest, Scottie Nell Hughes, accused him of rape. Payne denied the charge, but acknowledged having had an extramarital three-year-long "romantic relationship" with Hughes before the accusation was made. Hughes, who kept an apartment near Fox's Manhattan headquarters for the duration of the affair, claimed she believed it would help her obtain a permanent position at the network. Her appearances were drastically reduced after she ended the affair in 2015 and reported Payne to Fox. On 8 September 2017, Payne's suspension was lifted.

== Personal life ==
Payne is a resident of Teaneck, New Jersey. He is married to Yvonne Payne.

== See also ==
- Black conservatism in the United States
