= Schwab Network =

American financial news television channel

- Type: Business news network
- Country: US
- First air date: October 24, 2017
- Availability: National
- Founded: 2017
- Headquarters: Chicago
- Broadcast area: Internet, mobile
- Owner: TD Ameritrade (2017–2020); Charles Schwab Corporation (2020–present)
- Launch date: October 24, 2017
- Former names: TD Ameritrade Network (2017–2023)
- Official website: Official website

Schwab Network (originally TD Ameritrade Network) is an over-the-top (OTT) broadcast channel streaming financial news and education content. It was launched by TD Ameritrade on October 24, 2017, as a free service with four hours of live original programming. Investors could tune in for real-time business updates and growth forecasts delivered by CEOs, analysts and investors alongside veteran TD Ameritrade traders. From the outset, expanded hours beyond 8:30 AM to 12:30 PM were envisioned. By February 2018, the network was airing from 7:00 AM to 4:00 PM from its Chicago headquarters.

In November 2018, the TD Ameritrade Network announced Nicole Petallides, former Fox Business anchor and New York Stock Exchange floor reporter, would join the network as an on-air host corresponding from Nasdaq MarketSite in New York. Petallides joined a group of hosts including Oliver Renick, former Bloomberg Businessweek co-anchor, and a lineup of veteran traders from TD Ameritrade.

After TD Ameritrade was acquired by Charles Schwab Corporation in 2020, TD Ameritrade Network was rebranded accordingly to Schwab Network by 2023.

Schwab Network also offers translated programming for investors in Hong Kong and Singapore.
