= Cheryl Casone =

American news presenter and journalist

- Born: Cheryl Cecile Casone; July 18, 1970 (age 56); Clearwater Florida, U.S.
- Education: Northern Arizona University, B.S., public relations (1992)
- Occupations: Television news anchor, Fox Business Network
- Years active: 1997-present
- Title: Business News Anchor

Cheryl Cecile Casone (born July 18, 1970) is an American television news anchor on the Fox Business channel. Casone serves as a financial contributor and provides weekly job reports. She also reports on Fox News.

== Early life ==
Born in Clearwater, Florida, Casone's father was an engineering consultant for the government, and during her childhood she lived in Sweden for about a year. Later she lived in Ohio and then moved to Dallas, Texas and then moved to Phoenix, Arizona. She graduated from high school in 1988 from Thunderbird High School in Phoenix. She considers both Dallas and Phoenix as "Home". After high school, Casone attended Northern Arizona University in Flagstaff, Arizona, graduating with a B.S. in 1992, majoring in Public Relations.

According to Casone that after graduating from college, "[I] took a little bit of a detour. I was a flight attendant (Southwest Airlines) for five years, and I traveled the world... I went to Africa and Australia and Europe-mostly Western Europe. I went to New Zealand, I went to Nepal."

== Professional career ==
Casone moved to San Francisco, California in 1997. She began attending a community college and began her career at CNX Media on the nationally syndicated program "Travel Update.". She later moved to KRON-TV and served as a business and general assignment reporter. and also anchored a business news show.

In June 2004, moved to New York City with a position at MSNBC and occasional anchor of MSNBC Live from July 2004 until September 2005. In addition Casone was a freelance reporter for CBS News, as a general assignment reporter; and as freelance business correspondent for CNN, primarily reporting from the New York Stock Exchange (NYSE). She joined Fox News in November 2006.

At Fox, she is a former host of Cashin' In and a frequent guest host of The Claman Countdown. Casone is also the former host of "Fox Business Now," an hourly business web update that can be viewed on Yahoo and FoxNews.com.

Casone has done live reports from Middle East nations such as, Syria, Jordan, West Bank, and Israel. She has interviewed world leaders such as Tony Blair, Shimon Peres, and Hillary Clinton.

Media Matters reported that Casone, in response to a petition requesting that Mayor of New York City Zohran Mamdani not attend the 25th anniversary commeration of the September 11th attacks, said of Mamdani that "if it was 25 years ago, he'd be probably supporting the attackers on the World Trade Centers."
