= Jonathan Hoenig =

American businessman (born 1975)

- Born: September 10, 1975 (age 51); Glencoe, Illinois, United States
- Occupations: Stocks Investor, Founder, Capitalist Pig hedge fund, Contributor and panelist on Fox News Channel's Cashin' In
- Years active: 1998–present
- Website: CapitalistPig.com

Jonathan Hoenig (/ˈhoʊnɪɡ/; born September 10, 1975) is an American, founding member of the Capitalist Pig hedge fund, and was a regular contributor to and regular panelist on Fox News Channel's Cashin' In, Your World with Neil Cavuto, Red Eye w/ Greg Gutfeld and WLS (AM) 890's morning show, Don Wade & Roma (now defunct).

== Background ==
Hoenig was raised in Glencoe, Illinois, United States. He is a former floor trader at the Chicago Board of Trade, whose first book was published when he was 22. He is a member of the Economic Club of Chicago and a vocal supporter of Ayn Rand's philosophy of Objectivism. His brother Stephen died at the age of 19.

== Career ==
He is a frequent commentator in the financial press, and has written for: The Wall Street Journal Europe, Wired, Trader Monthly, Maxim, and Smartmoney.com. He has also been featured in The Wall Street Journal, Institutional Investor, and The Chronicle of Higher Education, and was recently named one of The Chicago Sun-Times Thirty Under Thirty and Crain's Forty Under Forty.

In 2013 Hoenig's firm became the first hedge fund to advertise in the US since the 1930s. Existing limitations on hedge fund advertising were lifted as a result of the Jumpstart Our Business Startups Act.

In 2013 he produced Pit Trading 101, a documentary film about new traders at the Chicago Mercantile Exchange, recognized at the Sunset International Film Festival, the Chagrin Film Festival and the International Film Awards Berlin.

In 2014, Hoenig was an informal advisor of Royalty Exchange a platform for buying and selling intellectual property.

Hoenig's second book, The Pit: Photographic Portrait of the Chicago Trading Floor was published in April, 2017, inspired by the 1903 Frank Norris novel of the same name.

In 2018, Hoenig edited and published A New Textbook of Americanism: The Politics of Ayn Rand. This anthology of individualist essays, produced in conjunction with the Ayn Rand Institute, features work by Yaron Brook, Leonard Peikoff completes Ayn Rand’s unfinished 1946 work of the same name.

In 2021, Price Is Primary: How to profit with any asset in any market at any time, a treatise which integrates Hoenig's investment process with Ayn Rand's philosophy of Objectivism was released.

In November 2023, working with Leonard Peikoff, Hoenig published Can You Really Love a Dog? Leonard Peikoff and Ayn Rand on Pets .

== Controversies ==
In September 2014, Hoenig stirred up controversy over racial profiling in a Fox News commentary piece, stating that "We should have been profiling on September 12, 2001. Let's take a trip down memory lane here: the last war this country won, we put Japanese-Americans in internment camps. We dropped nuclear bombs on residential city centers. Yes, profiling would be at least a good start. It's not on skin color, however. It's on ideology. Muslim, Islamists, jihadist-that's a good start but only a start. We need to stop giving Qur'ans to Gitmo prisoners. We need to stop having Ramadan celebrations in the White House. We have to stop saying the enemy is not Islamic; they are. That's how you get started."

In February 2015, Hoenig said on Fox News that those advocating mandatory vaccinations for the "so-called public good" could be ushering in "forced abortions" and "forced pills."
