= University of Chicago Magazine =

University of Chicago's alumni magazine

The University of Chicago Magazine is the University of Chicago's alumni magazine. It is published quarterly.

== Awards ==
- 2024 - Circle of Excellence Bronze for Magazines from the Council for Advancement and Support of Education.
- 2023 - Circle of Excellence Gold for Design from the Council for Advancement and Support of Education.
- 2021 - Circle of Excellence Silver for Design from the Council for Advancement and Support of Education.
- 2020 - Circle of Excellence Silver for Design from the Council for Advancement and Support of Education.
- 2018 - Circle of Excellence Silver for Magazines from the Council for Advancement and Support of Education.
