= Elizabeth MacDonald =

American financial journalist

Elizabeth MacDonald is an American financial journalist working for Fox Business. MacDonald used to work for The Wall Street Journal and as a senior editor at Forbes magazine. She won a Gerald Loeb Award for her work in magazines.

== Journalism career ==
Elizabeth MacDonald is the anchorwoman of The Evening Edit on Fox Business.

According to her Fox Business bio, MacDonald covered the IRS, corporate accounting scandals, taxes and Wall Street for The Wall Street Journal and Forbes Magazine, where she created Forbes' annual ranking, The World's 100 Most Powerful Women. Congress has called MacDonald in twice to testify about IRS abuses of taxpayers as well as IRS reforms that would protect taxpayers.

At The Wall Street Journal, MacDonald wrote front-page stories, Heard on the Street columns, and editorials. MacDonald also wrote about the coming wave of accounting scandals in the mid-90s.

MacDonald broke stories detailing the Church of Scientology's secret settlement with the IRS and the Kennedys' use of the IRS to target and audit political enemies, as well as thousands of groups and individuals, including Fair Play for Cuba Committee, connected to assassin Lee Harvey Oswald. MacDonald also covered allegations of political audits under the Clinton Administration.

Prior to that, MacDonald was a financial editor for Worth Magazine and covered the IRS and taxes for Money Magazine. MacDonald reported an award-winning investigative series on IRS abuses that members of Congress noted led to improved taxpayer rights and reforms at the IRS. MacDonald has received 14 awards.

== Early years ==
MacDonald was born on January 2, 1962, in Rockville Centre, New York; she is one of eight children. Canisius College in Buffalo, N.Y. has recognized MacDonald as a distinguished alumna; MacDonald graduated with honors in 1984.

== TV ==
MacDonald has also appeared as a guest on NBC's The Today Show, ABC's World News Tonight, Outnumbered, ABC's Nightline, Your World with Neil Cavuto, "On the Record with Greta Van Susteren", "The O'Reilly Factor", CBS This Morning, CNBC's Kudlow & Company with Larry Kudlow, C-SPAN, Court TV, as well as radio shows such as ABC News Radio, and NPR.

Fox News' Neil Cavuto and CNBC's Larry Kudlow have called MacDonald "a true class act" and an "independent voice" in journalism. MacDonald has argued on camera her support for same-sex marriage and over-the-counter birth control.

== Works ==
- Skirting Heresy: The Life and Times of Margery Kempe (Franciscan Media, June 2014)
