= Diário Económico =

Business newspaper in Portugal (1989–2016)

- Type: Business newspaper
- Format: Tabloid
- Publisher: Ongoing Media
- Founded: 30 October 1989
- Ceased publication: 18 March 2016
- Language: Portuguese
- Headquarters: Lisbon
- Country: Portugal
- Circulation: 15,000 (as of 2013)
- Sister newspapers: Weekend Económico

Diário Económico was a print Portuguese business newspaper based in Lisbon, Portugal. On 18 March 2016, the paper published the last print edition and went on online.

== History and profile ==
Diário Económico, based in Lisbon, was first published on 30 October 1989 and is published on weekdays. The publisher and owner of the paper, which is one of the leading reference on daily economics and finance in Portugal, was the holding Económica. It was part of Media Capital.

The current owner and publisher of Diário Económico is Ongoing Media. The company has other business newspapers: Semanário Económico, Weekend Económico, in Portugal and Brasil Econômico in Brazil which was established in October 2009.

Diário Económico was published in tabloid format. Until 2009 Martim Avillez Figueiredo, editor-in-chief of i, served as the editor-in-chief of the paper.

Diário Económico offered a monthly supplement, namely Fora de Série, which includes diverse economic and social topics and special supplements on an irregular basis on various subjects. In 2012, the paper launched a TV channel, Económico TV.

On 18 March 2016 the last print edition of Diário Económico appeared and the paper went on online.

== Circulation ==
In 1995 Diário Económico had a circulation of 5,566 copies. It was 7,882 copies in 1996, 9,352 copies in 1997, and 11,922 copies in 1998. In 1999 the paper had a circulation of 11,540 copies and in 2000 it was 12,843 copies. Its circulation was 11,000 copies both in 2003 and 2004.

The circulation of Diário Económico was 12,000 copies in 2007. It rose to 15,222 copies in 2009 and to 16,088 copies in 2010. Its 2011 circulation was 15,552 copies. The paper had a circulation of 13,754 copies in 2012. The 2013 circulation of the paper was 15,000 copies.
