= Uma Pemmaraju =

American journalist (1958–2022)

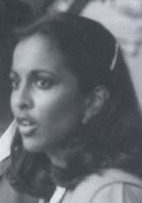
- Pemmaraju in 1982
- Born: 31 March 1958; Rajahmundry, Andhra Pradesh, India
- Died: 8 August 2022 (aged 64); Ossining, New York, United States
- Education: Trinity University
- Occupations: Journalist, news anchor
- Employer: Fox Entertainment Group
- Children: Kirina (daughter)
- Awards: Best News Anchor Team, Boston (magazine)

Uma Devi Pemmaraju (31 March 1958 – 8 August 2022) was an Indian-American journalist and television anchor. She was one of the original hosts on the Fox News cable network at their 1996 premiere. Born in India and raised in San Antonio, Texas, Pemmaraju was anchor of America's News Headquarters w/Uma Pemmaraju for Fox News in New York. She also reported for Bloomberg News from 2018 to 2019.

== Early life ==
Pemmaraju was born in Rajahmundry, Andhra Pradesh, India into a Telugu family, and grew up in San Antonio, Texas, United States. She graduated from Trinity University in Texas with a Bachelor of Arts degree in political science.

== Career ==
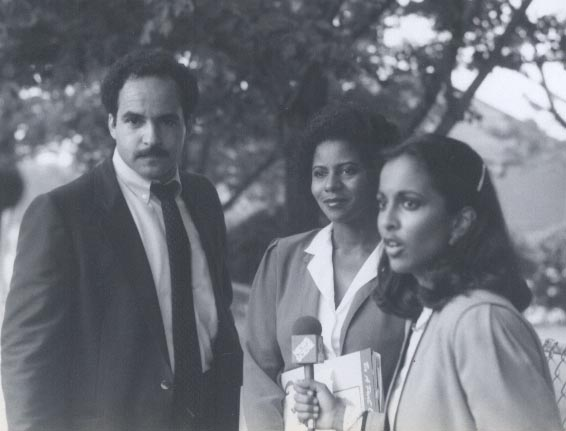
Pemmaraju interviewing candidates Curt Anderson and Georgia Goslee for WMAR-TV in 1982

Pemmaraju's early television career started in her home state of Texas at KENS-TV and the San Antonio Express-News newspaper as a producer and reporter while keeping a full-time load in college at Trinity University. She also served as the editor of her college newspaper. She next moved to KTVT-TV in Fort Worth, as a news anchor and correspondent and then to WMAR-TV in Baltimore where she won an Emmy. From Baltimore, she went to WLVI and WBZ-TV in Boston where she was a correspondent and a tipster/producer for WBZ's Evening Magazine.

Pemmaraju was part of the original Fox News team when the network launched in October 1996. She has hosted many different news shows on the network and has hosted a number of specials. She has interviewed high-profile newsmakers from the Dalai Lama to astronaut Buzz Aldrin, Joel Osteen, Carly Simon, Donald Trump, Whoopi Goldberg, Sarah Palin, along with a host of senators and congressional leaders from D.C. In addition to being coined as "Boston's Best Anchor" in 1996 and 1997 by Boston magazine, Pemmaraju has received numerous Emmy awards for her reporting and investigative journalism. Other honors throughout her career include: the Texas AP Award for reporting, The Woman of Achievement Award from the Big Sisters Organization of America and the Matrix Award from Women in Communications. She also attended American University studying international relations for one year as part of an exchange program with Trinity.

== Death ==
Pemmaraju died on 8 August 2022, at her home in Ossining, New York. A cause of death was not released.
