= Nicole Petallides =

American journalist (born 1971)

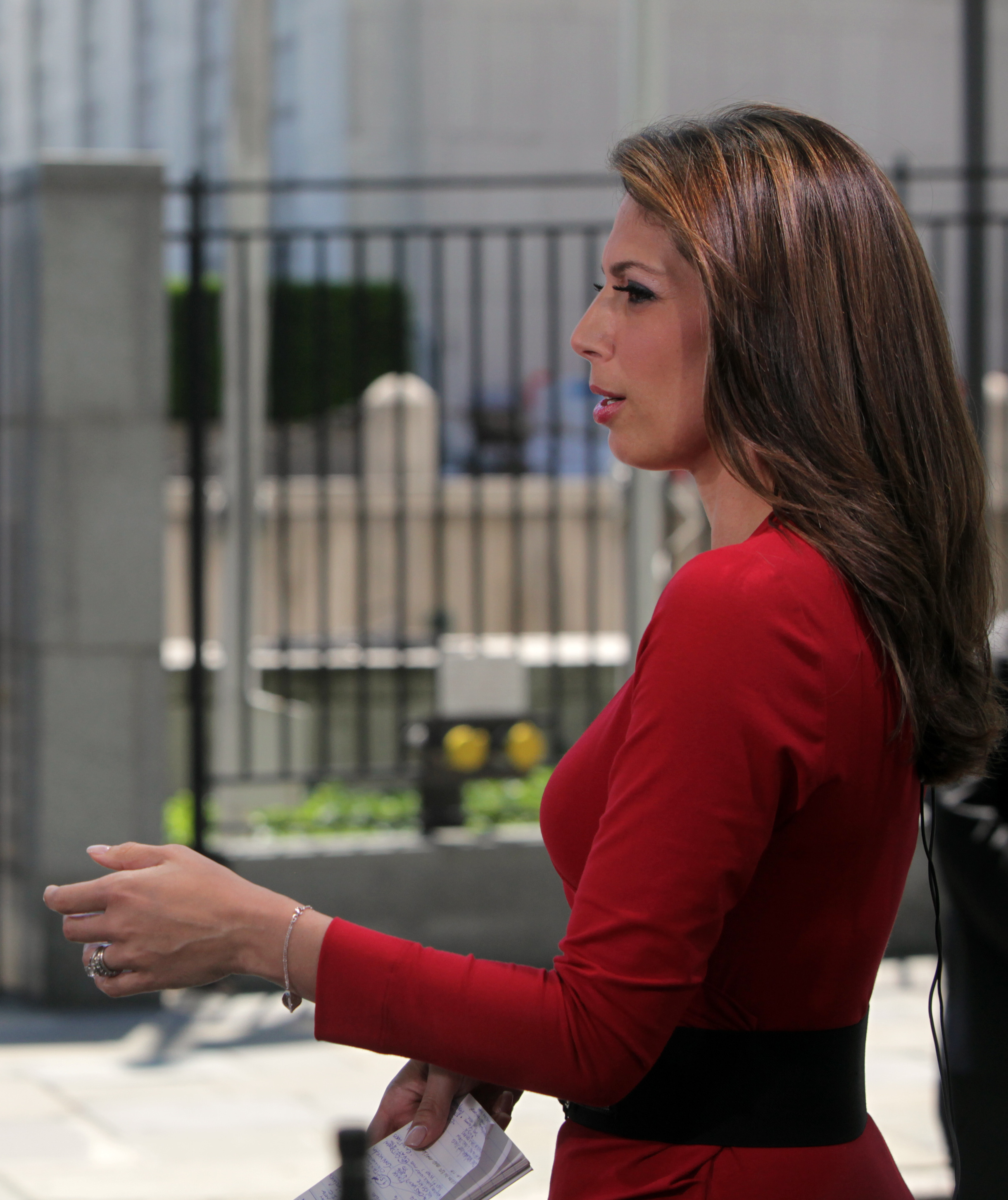
- Petallides in 2009
- Born: Nicole Anais Petallides; September 20, 1971 (age 55); New York City, U.S.
- Occupations: Anchor, reporter
- Employer: Charles Schwab Corporation (through TD Ameritrade)
- Spouse: Nicholas Tsiolas
- Children: 2 sons

Nicole Anais Petallides (born September 20, 1971) is an American journalist who works as an anchor for the online-only TD Ameritrade Network, which is owned and operated by Charles Schwab Corporation as a result of their acquisition of TD Ameritrade in 2020. Previously, she was an anchor for Fox Business. Gained experience at Dow Jones Television, CNBC, Bloomberg. She studied Communications and Business at The American University, Washington D.C. NCAA Division1 Women's Soccer. High School Friends Academy Locust Valley NY: 11 Varsity Letters (1 JV MVP) Soccer, Basketball, Softball. Lower School: Buckley Country Day School North Hills NY. Headmaster Award. Female MVP Athletics.

== Biography ==
Petallides is the daughter of Fannie (née Holliday) and John C. Petallides. Her father owns U.S. Amfax, a New York company that does telemarketing and promotions, a similar company called Salesforce 911, and Parent Reach, an emergency broadcast company. Her mother, an immigrant from Cyprus, is the founder and chief operating officer of Proini, a Greek-language daily newspaper, and of The Greek American, an English-language weekly newspaper.

In 1985, Petallides graduated from Buckley Country Day School Roslyn, New York State and the American University in 1993. In 1998, she married Manhattan dentist Nicholas Tsiolas in a ceremony performed by Archbishop Spyridon of the Greek Orthodox Archdiocese of the United States.

Prior to joining FBN, Petallides was an anchor at Bloomberg Television, where she reported from the New York Stock Exchange for the nationally syndicated shows, Bloomberg Business Report and Bloomberg Market Update. While at Bloomberg, she also covered weekend news and served as a business news anchor for CW11's WPIX morning news program in New York. Before joining Bloomberg, Petallides served as an assistant producer for CNBC, where she produced daily floor reports from the NYSE. Prior to CNBC, she was a segment producer for Dow Jones Televisions's The Wall Street Journal Report with Consuelo Mack and international programs Asian Business News and European Business News. She has also contributed to Fox affiliate WNYW's morning show Good Day New York, NY1 News, CNN, and News 12 Long Island. She has been a guest panelist on the Fox News' late-night satire show Red Eye w/Greg Gutfeld.
