= David Asman =

American television news anchor

- Born: February 15, 1954 (age 72); Hollis, Queens, NY
- Education: Marlboro College; Northwestern University (M.Ed.)
- Occupation: Television news anchor
- Employer: Fox Entertainment Group
- Notable credit(s): The Wall Street Journal editor, Prospect editor, Fox News Live host, Forbes on Fox host, Fox Business co-anchor, America's Nightly Scoreboard, Power and Money anchor, Bulls & Bears co-anchor
- Spouse: Marta Cecilia

David Asman (/ˈæzmən/; born February 15, 1954) is an American television news anchor for Fox Business and Fox News.

Asman first joined Fox News in 1997. He currently works as a substitute anchor for various Fox Business Network programs and anchors numerous other Fox News Specials. He previously hosted Bulls & Bears, Forbes on Fox and Fox News Live weekdays before joining the Fox News Channel's documentary unit.

== Career ==
=== Early career ===
In 1978, Asman was hired as an assistant editor at Prospect. The next year, he became the magazine's executive editor. In 1980, Asman was hired by George Gilder to start an economic journal at the Manhattan Institute.

=== The Wall Street Journal ===
Asman began his career at the editorial page of The Wall Street Journal, where he covered Latin America for 12 years, before becoming editorial features editor. While in Latin America during the volatile period of the 1980s, he wrote over 100 articles and won several awards from the Inter-American Press Association for his writings on Cuba and Mexico, as well as for his editing of a weekly column on Latin America. During this period, Asman also edited a column on business management for The Wall Street Journal called "Manager's Journal." Two collections of these columns were published, the last of which, The Wall Street Journal On Management: Adding Value Through Synergy, was published by Doubleday. Asman was appointed editorial features editor at a time when the Journal's editorial page was breaking stories. Whitewater.

=== Fox News ===
Asman left The Wall Street Journal to join Fox News in 1997, one year after the news channel's inception. He has interviewed many politicians, newsmakers, and business leaders such as Sarah, Duchess of York, Congressman Ron Paul, Rupert Murdoch, Barry Diller, Michael Eisner, Steve Forbes, William F. Buckley, Jr., John R. Bolton, Otto Reich, Mosab Hassan Yousef, Pat Robertson, Rudy Giuliani, Woody Johnson, Donald Trump, Buzz Aldrin, Ben Stein, Dick Cavett, Stan Lee, Peter Guber, Chuck Norris, David Stern, Don Garber, Joe Gibbs, Cal Ripken Jr., Danika Patrick, and the Williams sisters; U.S. President George W. Bush; Canadian Prime Minister Stephen Harper; Navy secretary J. William Middendorf; 9/11 Hero Dave Karnes; Securities and Exchange Commission chairman Harvey Pitt; and former House Speaker Newt Gingrich.

In December 2023, during a conversation with Pete Buttigieg, Asman claimed that he had a friend whose car dealership was trying to sell him a Ford F-150 Lightning for only $10,000. He has not provided proof of this story, which was called a lie by Jonathan V. Last.

=== Publications ===
Asman continues to write articles for The Wall Street Journal and other publications, including an article about his Marine stepson, and an article about his wife's stroke and their experiences with British Health Care.

=== Cable news show history ===
==== Fox Business ====
- Fox Business, (Co-Anchor, 2007–present)
- America's Nightly Scoreboard, (Anchor, 2007–2011)
- After the Bell, (Co-Anchor, 2008–present)
- Power and Money (2011)
- Bulls & Bears

==== Fox News ====
- Fox News Live (anchor, 1997–2005)
- Forbes on Fox (host, 2002–2018)

== Personal ==
Asman is married to Marta Cecilia, a native of Nicaragua. Asman's stepson, Felipe, served with the U.S. Marine Corps during the Iraq War.
