= Cavuto =

Cavuto is a surname of Italian origins. Notable people with the surname include:

- Antônio Roberto Cavuto (1944–2026), Brazilian Roman Catholic bishop
- Neil Cavuto (born 1958), American television news anchor, commentator and business journalist
