= Bill McCuddy =

American journalist

Bill McCuddy is a comedian, and was previously an American cable news network entertainment reporter.

McCuddy, who had previously been employed in the field of advertising, began his broadcasting career in 1994 after winning a talk show host contest on CNBC featuring unknown participants. His reward was a contract to host a program that would air on America's Talking, a CNBC spin-off cable channel that would launch shortly thereafter. After his stint as the host of Wake Up America on the fledgling network, McCuddy joined Fox News in 1996 as a regular contributor to various programming on the network. In June 2007 Fox News announced it would not renew McCuddy's contract.

For a brief time McCuddy was also a writer for Saturday Night Live.

Since 2012, McCuddy has co-hosted the roundtable movie review series "Talking Pictures on Demand" with Neil Rosen and Lisa Rosman for Time Warner Cable. In August 2015, McCuddy and Rosen launched the "Sitting Around Talking Movies" podcast. In 2022, McCuddy and Bridget LeRoy launched the "AirHamptons with Bill and Bridget" radio and television show on WLIW and LTV.
