= Fox Business =

American business channel

Fox Business Network
- Country: United States
- Broadcast area: Worldwide; Canada; United States
- Headquarters: 1211 Avenue of the Americas; New York City, U.S.

Programming
- Language: English
- Picture format: 720p HDTV (downscaled to letterboxed 480i for the SDTV feed)

Ownership
- Owner: News Corporation (2007–2013); 21st Century Fox (2013–2019); Fox Corporation (2019–present)
- Parent: Fox News Media
- Sister channels: Fox Broadcasting Company; Fox News; Fox Weather; FS1; FS2; LiveNOW from Fox; Fox Soul; MyNetworkTV

History
- Launched: October 15, 2007; 19 years ago

Links
- Website: foxbusiness.com

Availability

Streaming media
- Fox One: fox.com: (American cable internet subscribers only; requires subscription, trial, or television provider login to access content)
- Online stream: Fox News Go (pay-TV subscribers only)
- Service(s): DirecTV Stream, FuboTV, Fox One, Hulu + Live TV, Sling TV, YouTube TV

Fox Business Network, commonly referred to as Fox Business, is an American business news channel and website publication owned by the Fox News Media division of Fox Corporation. The channel broadcasts primarily from studios at 1211 Avenue of the Americas in Midtown Manhattan. Launched on October 15, 2007, the network features trading day coverage and a nightly lineup of opinion-based talk shows.

Day-to-day operations are run by Kevin Magee, executive vice president of Fox News; Neil Cavuto was the vice president and managing editor for the network and business news operation overall.

As of February 2015, Fox Business is available to approximately 74,224,000 pay television households (63.8% of households with television) in the United States.

== History ==
News Corporation chairman Rupert Murdoch confirmed the launch at his keynote address at the 2007 McGraw-Hill Media Summit on February 8, 2007. Murdoch had publicly stated that if News Corporation's purchase of The Wall Street Journal went through and if it were legally possible, he would have rechristened the channel with a name that has "Journal" in it. However, on July 11, 2007, News Corporation announced that the new channel would be called Fox Business Network (a.k.a. Fox Business), a name chosen over Fox Business Channel due to the pre-existing (though seldom used) legal abbreviation of "FBC" for the co-owned broadcast network Fox Broadcasting Company.

Before the network launched, few specific facts were made public as to the type of programming approach Fox Business would be taking. However, some details emerged as to how it would differentiate itself from its main competitor, CNBC. At a media summit hosted by BusinessWeek magazine, Rupert Murdoch was quoted as saying CNBC was too "negative towards business". They promised to make Fox Business more "business friendly". In addition, it was expected that Fox Business would not be "poaching" a lot of CNBC's on-air talent in the immediate future, as most key on-air personalities had been locked into a long-term contract. However, that still left open the possibility of the network taking some of CNBC's other staff, including editors, producers and other reporters.

The channel launched on October 15, 2007. The network is placed on channel 43 in the New York City market in the basic-tier pay-TV package, which is home to the NYSE and NASDAQ stock exchanges. It is paired with sister network Fox News Channel, which moved to channel 44 (CNBC is carried on channel 15 on Time Warner Cable's New York City area systems). Fox Business received carriage on Cablevision channel 106, only available via subscription to its IO Digital Cable package. According to an article in Multichannel News, NBC Universal paid up to "several million dollars" in order to ensure that CNBC and Fox Business would be separated on the dial, and in order to retain CNBC's "premium" channel slot. At the time Fox Business was carried on Time Warner Cable only on its analog service in New York City (most systems have since switched to digital-only); in other markets, the channel's carriage was limited to premium digital cable packages at extra cost. Verizon's FiOS TV also carries the network on its premier lineup (SD channel 117 and HD channel 617). Dish Network began carrying Fox Business on channel 206 on February 2, 2009. Fox Business also received carriage on DirecTV channel 359. As its prominence grew, some providers indeed moved the channel to their basic package, and some have paired Bloomberg Television, CNBC and Fox Business next to each other as part of 'genre' channel maps.

On November 10, 2015, Fox Business, along with The Wall Street Journal hosted its first Republican presidential primary debate, setting a ratings record for the network with 13.5 million viewers. The debate also delivered 1.4 million concurrent streams, making it the most watched livestreaming primary debate in history and beating out the 2015 Super Bowl by 100,000 streams. Fox Business hosted its second Republican primary debate on January 14, 2016, in Charleston, South Carolina with Neil Cavuto and Maria Bartiromo serving as moderators. Both of these primetime debates also included earlier debates featuring presidential candidates who were not ranked as highly in the national polls as well as those based in Iowa or New Hampshire.

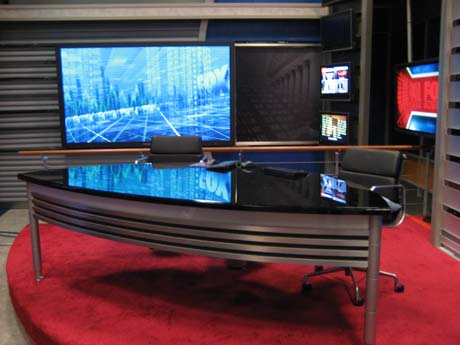
Studio F, the previous (now a FedEx Office) studio for Fox Business Morning and the network

On December 14, 2017, 21st Century Fox announced it would sell a majority of its assets to The Walt Disney Company in a transaction valued at over $52 billion. Fox Business was not included in the deal and was spun off to the significantly downsized Fox Corporation, along with the Fox Broadcasting Company, Fox News Channel and Fox Sports 1 and 2. The deal was approved by Disney and Fox shareholders on July 27, 2018, and was completed on March 19, 2019.

On September 29, 2019, Fox Business unveiled a new slogan, "Investing in You", a new on-air graphics scheme based on one recently adopted by Fox News Channel, and updated digital platforms. The channel also announced the new Friday-night program Barron's Roundtable.

== Programming and on-air staff ==
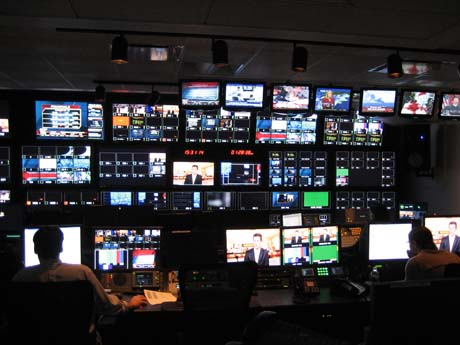
Fox Business's control room

David Asman, Maria Bartiromo, Cheryl Casone, Dagen McDowell, and Stuart Varney are anchors for Fox Business; they also appear on Fox News Channel. In addition, Brenda Buttner was also on the roster on Fox Business until her death in 2017.

Other anchors include Peter Barnes, Tom Sullivan, Jenna Lee, Nicole Petallides and Cody Willard. Reporters include Jeff Flock (a CNN "original"), Shibani Joshi (from News 12 Westchester), and Connell McShane (from Bloomberg Television). The network previously had former Hewlett-Packard CEO Carly Fiorina (a 2016 presidential candidate) as a contributor.

Dave Ramsey had a one-hour prime time show, similar in format to his syndicated radio show, until June 2010. Tom Sullivan broadcast his Tom Sullivan Show on the radio, with plans to syndicate the show nationwide with the assistance of Fox News Radio. Adam Shapiro (formerly with Cleveland's WEWS-TV and New York City's WNBC) was added to Fox Business to report from the Washington, D.C. bureau. On October 18, 2007, former CNBC anchor Liz Claman joined Fox Business as co-anchor of the 2-3 p.m. portion of the dayside business news block with David Asman. Her first assignment for Fox Business was an interview with Warren Buffett.

In April 2008, Brian Sullivan (no relation to Tom) joined Fox Business, coming over from Bloomberg Television. Sullivan, who reunited with his Bloomberg colleague Connell McShane, anchored the 10 a.m.-12 p.m. portion of the business news block with Dagen McDowell.

On May 12, 2008, Fox Business revamped its daytime lineup, which included the debut of two new programs, Countdown to the Closing Bell and Fox Business Bulls & Bears. On April 20, 2009, Money for Breakfast, The Opening Bell on Fox Business (both hosted by Alexis Glick), The Noon Show with Tom Sullivan and Cheryl Casone, Countdown to the Closing Bell, Fox Business Bulls & Bears, and Cavuto all moved to the network's new Studio G set. All six of those shows shared the same set in Studio G, which was unveiled on Money for Breakfast the same day.

In September 2009, Don Imus and Fox Business reached an agreement to carry his show, Imus in the Morning, on Fox Business. The show began airing on October 5, 2009. Fox had previously been in negotiations with Imus to bring his show to the network. In November 2007 (when Imus was just returning to radio, and Fox Business was just starting), negotiations fell through and Imus instead signed with rural-oriented network RFD-TV.

On December 23, 2009, Alexis Glick left Fox Business. Announcing that that day's episode of The Opening Bell would be her last, she said "I know this is not the norm, but I don't believe in abrupt departures." The only reason given by Glick for her departure was that she was leaving to "embark on a new venture," but a number of sources have noted that Don Imus' new morning show had a significant effect upon Glick's screen time since he signed with the network.

On November 10, 2010, Fox Business announced that former CNN anchor Lou Dobbs would join the channel. His program, Lou Dobbs Tonight, moved to Fox Business in March 2011.

On February 24, 2014, former CNBC host Maria Bartiromo moved to Fox Business, where she would host Opening Bell with Maria Bartiromo, and become a Fox News contributor.

In April 2015, it was reported that Fox Business would drop the Imus in the Morning simulcast, as Imus was planning to move from New York City to Texas. On May 11, the network officially announced a new daytime lineup that would begin June 1; FBN AM would air from 5-6 a.m. ET, and Bartiromo moved to the 6-9 a.m. ET timeslot formerly held by Imus to host Mornings with Maria. Varney & Company was moved up to 9 a.m. and expanded to three hours, Neil Cavuto would host the new midday program Cavuto: Coast to Coast, and Trish Regan (moving from Bloomberg Television) would host the new afternoon program The Intelligence Report, and Melissa Francis moved to co-anchor After the Bell alongside David Asman.

Former UK Independence Party head Nigel Farage was announced as a commentator on January 20, 2017, the day of Donald Trump's presidential inauguration. Farage will provide political analysis for both Fox Business and Fox News.

=== Sports programming ===
Fox Business has occasionally served as an overflow channel for Fox Sports telecasts in the event of programming conflicts across Fox, Fox Sports 1, and Fox Sports 2, particularly college football. For instance in 2017, a game between Baylor and Oklahoma State aired on Fox Business due to a weather-delayed game on FS1. It was reported in May 2018 that, following a decision in November 2017 to move the first quarter of a Pac-12 football game between Washington and Stanford from FS1 to FS2 (which does not have wide carriage) due to a NASCAR Camping World Truck Series overrun, that Fox would prefer the use of Fox Business for future Pac-12 overflow situations, as it has significantly wider distribution (if not slightly wider than FS1 in terms of total households) than FS2, and that it would carry minimal impact to programming.

Occasional scheduled sports programming began airing on Fox Business in 2025. That year, Fox Business aired a MotoGP race (the Grand Prix of Argentina), second-round coverage of a LIV Golf League event in Virginia, and horse racing from Saratoga Race Course on Labor Day weekend.

== On-air staff ==
=== Anchors/hosts ===
- Madison Alworth
- David Asman
- Brian Brenberg
- Cheryl Casone
- Liz Claman
- Jackie DeAngelis
- Kennedy
- Larry Kudlow
- Elizabeth MacDonald
- Dagen McDowell
- Charles Payne
- Taylor Riggs
- Lauren Simonetti
- Stuart Varney
- Ashley Webster

=== Reporters ===
These reporters are based in New York unless otherwise stated.

- Jeff Flock (Chicago)
- Charles Gasparino
- Susan Li
- Gerri Willis

=== Contributors ===
- Gerry Baker
- Nigel Farage
- Jon Hilsenrath
- Jonathan Hoenig
- Dave Ramsey

=== Former on-air staff ===
- Maria Bartiromo (2014–2026)
- Eric Bolling, later with Newsmax
- Blake Burman, now with NewsNation
- Deirdre Bolton (2014–2020), later with ABC News
- Brenda Buttner (2007–2016, deceased)
- Tracy Byrnes (2007–2015)
- Tracee Carrasco
- Neil Cavuto (2007–2024)
- Rebecca Diamond
- Lou Dobbs (2011–2021, deceased)
- Sean Duffy (2023–2024), now United States Secretary of Transportation
- Kmele Foster
- Melissa Francis (2011–2020)
- Alexis Glick (2007–2009), Money for Breakfast and The Opening Bell on Fox Business; no longer in the television industry
- Shibani Joshi (2007–2013)
- Terry Keenan, host of Cashin' In (2002–2009, deceased)
- John Layfield, now at WWE
- Jenna Lee (2007–2010), Fox Business Morning; no longer in the television industry
- Connell McShane (2007–2023), now with NewsNation
- Andrew Napolitano
- Kristina Partsinevelos, now with CNBC
- Nicole Petallides (2007–2018), now with Schwab Network
- Trish Regan (2015–2020)
- Lori Rothman
- Anthony Scaramucci
- Adam Shapiro, now with Yahoo! Finance
- Sandra Smith, now on Fox News Channel
- John Stossel (2009–2016)
- Brian Sullivan (2008–2011), now with CNBC
- Tom Sullivan (2007–2017), now hosts a syndicated talk radio program
- Matt Welch
- Cody Willard

== Ratings ==
On January 4, 2008, The New York Times and several other media outlets reported that Fox Business had registered an average of 6,300 viewers, far below Nielsen's 35,000-viewer threshold. The number was so low that neither Nielsen nor Fox Business were allowed to confirm the number. The Times and other media outlets noted the network is less than four months old and only in one-third as many households as is CNBC.

In July 2008, Nielsen estimated that Fox Business averaged 8,000 viewers per daytime hour and 20,000 per prime time hour, compared to 284,000 and 191,000 (respectively) for CNBC. Because Fox Business's viewership remained low, Nielsen had difficulty estimating viewership, and the estimates are not statistically significant. At the time, Fox Business was available in approximately 40 million homes to CNBC's over 90 million.

In the fall 2008, Fox Business was losing to CNBC in the ratings by over 10 to 1.

By June 2009, showed Fox Business with an average of 21,000 viewers between 5 a.m. and 9 p.m., still under the Nielsen threshold, and less than 10% of CNBC's 232,000 for the same time span. At this point, Fox Business was available in about 49 million U.S. homes.

Reports of ratings from the first episode of Imus in the Morning reported an average of 177,000 viewers (and a peak of 202,000 in the 7:00 a.m. hour) in the time slot, mostly over the age of 65; this was a more than tenfold increase compared to the network's previous morning show, Money for Breakfast. The program even beat CNBC's Squawk Box in the time slot.

In 2012, Lou Dobbs Tonight was challenging CNBC's Larry Kudlow, earning 141,000 total viewers on Fox Business.

The first quarter of 2016 had Fox Business experience its strongest ratings in its history with day programming up 111 percent in total viewers and 130 percent in the key age 25 to 54 demographic, compared to a year before.

As of August 2017, Fox Business had surpassed CNBC's ratings for nine consecutive months, and Lou Dobbs Tonight was the most-watched program in business news. CNBC announced in 2015 that it would no longer rely on Nielsen ratings to measure its daytime audience, turning to rival Cogent Reports instead.

Fox Business was the most-watched business cable news channel among total day viewers during the second quarter of 2024.

== Controversies ==
=== COVID-19 pandemic ===
On March 27, 2020, Trish Regan departed the network, amid criticism of a segment on the March 9 episode of Trish Regan Primetime, where she accused Democrats of exploiting the COVID-19 pandemic solely to blame President Donald Trump for it, and launch another round of impeachment hearings.

On December 23, 2020, Mornings with Maria aired an interview with a person who claimed to be Smithfield Foods CEO Dennis Organ, but was actually an animal rights activist from Direct Action Everywhere, warned that the meat packing industry could "effectively [bring] on the next pandemic". Bartiromo issued a correction at the end of the show, admitting that they had been "punked".

=== Smartmatic election fraud claims ===
In November 2020, Fox Business anchors Maria Bartiromo and Lou Dobbs promoted conspiracy theories during their programs, tying the voting machine manufacturer Smartmatic to voter fraud during the 2020 presidential election. This included claims that it had ties to Dominion Voting Systems and the country of Venezuela. In December 2020, Smartmatic requested a retraction of the coverage by Fox Business, Fox News, Newsmax and One America News Network, stating that it was "false and defamatory". To comply with the request, the two anchors' programs, as well as that of Fox News anchor Jeanine Pirro, all aired a pre-recorded interview with Edward Perez, an election technology expert at the Open Source Election Technology Institute, which fact-checked various election fraud claims (including those surrounding Smartmatic).

On February 4, 2021, Smartmatic filed a $2.7 billion lawsuit against Fox News Media for defamation, specifically naming Bartiromo, Dobbs, and Pirro. The next day, Fox Business abruptly canceled Lou Dobbs Tonight.

== Availability ==
=== Outside the United States ===
On April 20, 2009, the Canadian Radio-television and Telecommunications Commission approved Fox Business for distribution in Canada; it is currently available through Rogers Cable's 'Ignite TV' service.

As of July 2011, the channel is carried on Sky Italia (a fellow News Corporation company at the time), its first European carriage deal. Fox Business HD was first broadcast in Israel by cable provider Hot in 2015, and it is also carried by Cellcom TV and Partner TV.

In Australia, Sky News Business Channel (subsequently relaunched as Your Money in October 2018) simulcast Fox Business during overnight hours since its launch in January 2008, until the channel was closed down in May 2019. The channel was operated by Australian News Channel Pty Ltd, which was partly owned by Sky plc in the United Kingdom (a fellow 21st Century Fox company at the time) until December 2016, when News Corp Australia (a fellow Rupert Murdoch company) acquired the Australian broadcaster in its entirety.

In Central America, the Dominican Republic and the Caribbean, Fox Business is carried by Central American, Dominican and Caribbean TV operators. In Costa Rica, Fox Business is available for streaming on the Fox News International mobile application and the channel is carried by Costa Rican TV operators.

In Mexico, Fox Business is available for streaming on the Fox News International mobile application and the channel is carried by Mexican TV operators.

In Colombia, Fox Business is carried by Colombian TV operators.

In Venezuela, Fox Business is carried by Venezuelan TV operators.

In Italy, Fox Business is carried by Sky Italia.

In Ecuador, Fox Business is carried by Ecuadorian TV operators.

In Peru, Fox Business is carried by Peruvian TV operators.

In Chile, Fox Business is available for streaming on the Fox News International moblie application and the channel is carried by Chilean TV operators.

In Brazil, Fox Business is carried by Brazilian TV operators.

In Spain, Fox Business is available for streaming on the Fox News International mobile application and the channel is carried by other Spanish TV operators.

In the United Kingdom, Fox Business is available for streaming on the Fox News International mobile application.

=== Dispute with Spectrum ===
In 2018, Fox decided to remove Fox Business and Fox News from the Spectrum cable network, with both channels subsequently removed on May 1, 2018. However, both channels returned to Spectrum on May 10, 2018.

== High definition ==
The high-definition simulcast of Fox Business is broadcast in 720p. Programming shown on this feed was originally produced in high-definition, but was cropped to a 4:3 image and pushed to the left side of the screen, with the extra room used for additional content, such as statistics and charts, and a wider ticker with more room; the information sidebar was named "The Fox HD Wing" (competitor channel CNBC HD used the enhanced HD format until October 13, 2014, when it was discontinued altogether).

The sidebar graphic was dropped as a result of the network's switch to a 16:9 letterboxed format on September 17, 2012, ending the enhanced HD format altogether. The enhanced ticker and headlines, which were previously seen in the old sidebar graphic, were moved to the lower-third of the screen. Both the SD and HD feeds now use the same exact 16:9 letterbox format, just like its other Fox-owned sister networks.

== The Fox 50 ==
The Fox 50 is an industrial index of large companies that is used by Fox Business; it consists primarily of "the largest U.S. companies that make the products you know and use every day." The index includes:

- 3M
- Amazon.com
- American Express
- Apple Inc.
- AT&T
- Bank of America
- Best Buy
- Boeing
- Chevron
- Citigroup
- Coca-Cola
- Colgate-Palmolive
- Comcast
- Costco
- Deere
- Dell
- DuPont
- eBay
- ExxonMobil
- FedEx
- Ford
- General Electric
- General Mills
- Google
- Hewlett-Packard
- Home Depot
- IBM
- Intel
- Johnson & Johnson
- JPMorgan
- Kraft Foods
- McDonald's
- Merck
- Microsoft
- Nike
- PepsiCo
- Pfizer
- Procter & Gamble
- Prudential Financial
- Starbucks
- Target
- United Parcel Service
- UnitedHealth Group
- Verizon
- ViacomCBS
- Walmart
- The Walt Disney Company
- WarnerMedia
- Wells Fargo
- Yum! Brands

Anheuser-Busch and Merrill Lynch were included in the original index, but each was acquired by other companies in 2008. They were replaced by Wells Fargo and HP. In March 2011, CBS Corporation, Charles Schwab Corporation, Lowe's, Sprint Nextel, and Yahoo! were removed, and replaced by DuPont, Ford, JPMorgan, Pfizer, and UnitedHealth Group. This index is not available to purchase in the form of an index fund or ETF. The fund received criticism from some financial bloggers for putting together an index with so many competing brands (such as FedEx and UPS; McDonald's and Yum! Brands; WalMart, Target and Costco; Apple, Dell and Microsoft; and Coca-Cola and PepsiCo).

== Competitors ==
- Bloomberg Television
- CNBC
