= Bruno Giovanni Quidaciolu =

Bruno Giovanni Quidaciolu may refer to two American actors:

- Bruno Giovanni Quidaciolu, Sr. (1925–2021), known as Bruce Kirby (actor)
- Bruno Giovanni Quidaciolu, Jr. (1949–2006), his son, known as Bruno Kirby
