= List of awards and nominations received by Rob Reiner =

Rob Reiner awards and nominations
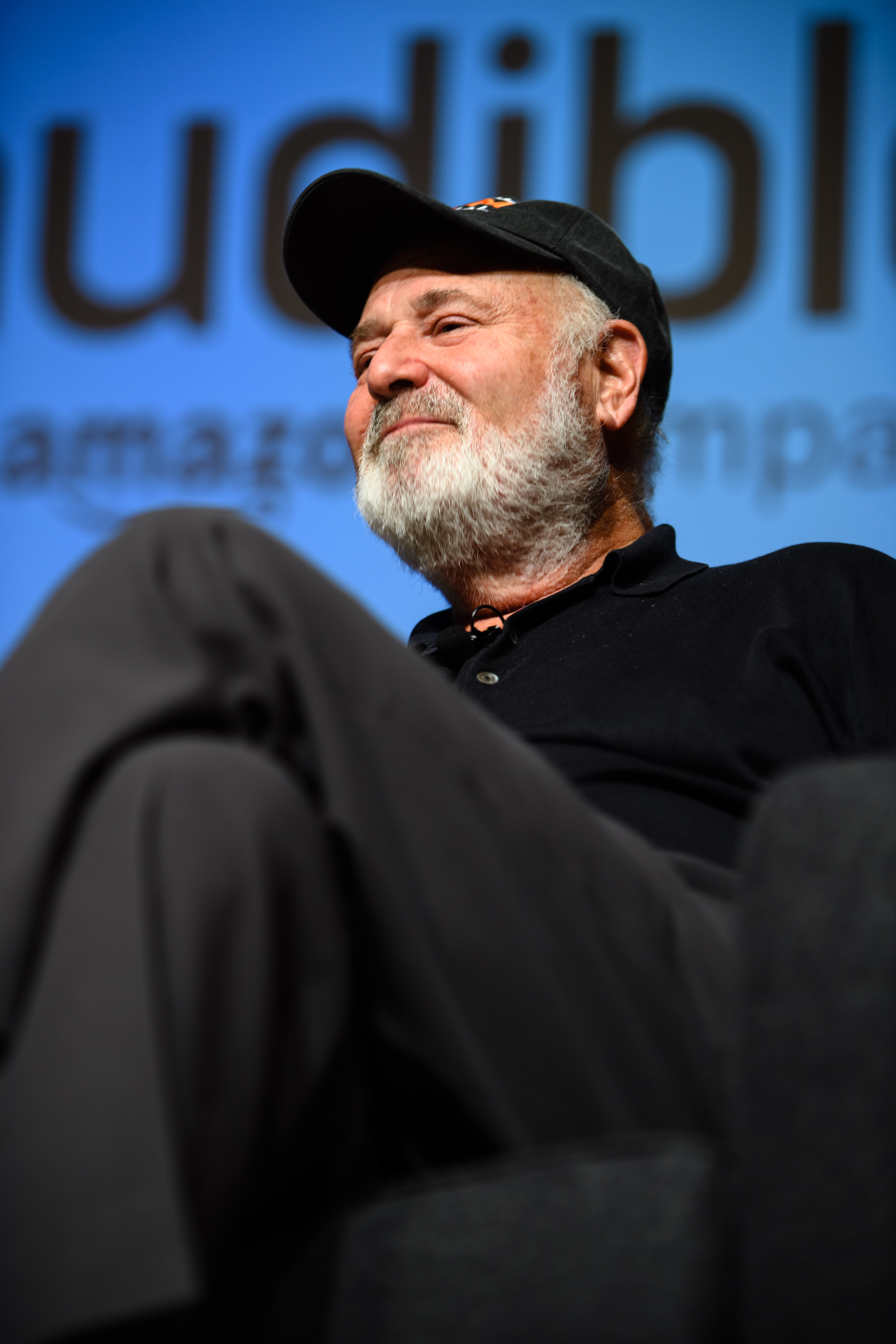
- Reiner at the Montclair Film Festival in 2016.
Awards and nominations
Award	Wins	Nominations
Academy Awards	0	1
British Academy Film Awards	0	1
Directors Guild of America Awards	0	3
Golden Globe Awards	0	9
Grammy Awards	0	1
Primetime Emmy Awards	3	8
Producers Guild of America Awards	0	3

Totals (Note: Certain award groups do not simply award one winner. They acknowledge several different recipients, have runners-up, and have third place. Since this is a specific recognition and is different from losing an award, runner-up mentions are considered wins in this award tally. For simplification and to avoid errors, each award in this list has been presumed to have had a prior nomination.)
- Wins: 7
- Nominations: 33

Rob Reiner was an American filmmaker and actor. He received numerous accolades, including three Primetime Emmy Awards, and earned nominations for an Academy Award, a British Academy Film Award, and nine Golden Globe Awards. Reiner was honored with a star on the Hollywood Walk of Fame in 1999 and a tribute at Film at Lincoln Center in 2014. Three of his films have been inducted into the National Film Registry. (Note: The films are This is Spinal Tap, The Princess Bride, and When Harry Met Sally...)

Reiner rose to prominence as an actor portraying Mike "Meathead" Stivic on the CBS sitcom All in the Family (1971–1979), a role that earned him two Primetime Emmy Award for Outstanding Supporting Actor in a Comedy Series as well as nominations for five Golden Globe Awards for Best Supporting Actor – Series, Miniseries or Television Film. He made his directorial film debut with the rock mockumentary This Is Spinal Tap (1984).

Reiner than directed a string of successful studio films such as the coming-of-age drama Stand By Me (1986) which earned him nominations for the Golden Globe Award for Best Director, the Independent Spirit Award for Best Director, and the Directors Guild of America Award for Outstanding Directorial Achievement in Theatrical Feature Film. He directed the fantasy adventure romantic comedy The Princess Bride (1987) which earned him the Hugo Award for Best Dramatic Presentation. He directed the romantic comedy When Harry Met Sally... (1989) for which he was nominated for the BAFTA Award for Best Film, the Golden Globe Award for Best Director, and the Directors Guild of America Award for Outstanding Director.

With the legal drama A Few Good Men (1992) he was nominated for the Academy Award for Best Picture, the Golden Globe Award for Best Director, and the Directors Guild of America Award for Outstanding Directorial Achievement in Theatrical Feature Film. He directed the political romantic drama The American President (1995) for which he was nominated for the Golden Globe Award for Best Director.

== Major associations ==
=== Academy Awards ===
Year	Category	Nominated work	Result	Ref.
1992	Best Picture	A Few Good Men	Nominated	

=== BAFTA Awards ===
Year	Category	Nominated work	Result	Ref.
British Academy Film Awards
1989	Best Film	When Harry Met Sally...	Nominated	

=== Directors Guild of America Awards ===
Year	Category	Nominated work	Result	Ref.
1986	Outstanding Directorial Achievement in Motion Pictures	Stand by Me	Nominated	
1989	Outstanding Directorial Achievement in Motion Pictures	When Harry Met Sally...	Nominated	
1992	Outstanding Directorial Achievement in Motion Pictures	A Few Good Men	Nominated	

=== Emmy Awards ===
Year	Category	Nominated work	Result	Ref.
Primetime Emmy Awards
1972	Outstanding Supporting Actor in a Comedy Series	All in the Family	Nominated	
1973	Outstanding Supporting Actor in a Comedy Series	All in the Family	Nominated	
1974	Outstanding Supporting Actor in a Comedy Series	All in the Family	Won	
1975	Outstanding Supporting Actor in a Comedy Series	All in the Family	Nominated	
1978	Outstanding Supporting Actor in a Comedy Series	All in the Family	Won	
2024	Outstanding Documentary or Nonfiction Special	Albert Brooks: Defending My Life	Nominated	
2024	Outstanding Directing for a Documentary/Nonfiction Program	Albert Brooks: Defending My Life	Nominated	
2026	Outstanding Guest Actor in a Comedy Series	The Bear (For "Tonnato")	Won (Note: Posthumous award.)	

=== Golden Globe Awards ===
Year	Category	Nominated work	Result	Ref.
1971	Best Supporting Actor – Series, Miniseries or Television Film	All in the Family	Nominated	
1972	Best Supporting Actor – Series, Miniseries or Television Film	All in the Family	Nominated	
1973	Best Supporting Actor – Series, Miniseries or Television Film	All in the Family	Nominated	
1975	Best Supporting Actor – Series, Miniseries or Television Film	All in the Family	Nominated	
1976	Best Supporting Actor – Series, Miniseries or Television Film	All in the Family	Nominated	
1986	Best Director	Stand by Me	Nominated	
1989	Best Director	When Harry Met Sally...	Nominated	
1992	Best Director	A Few Good Men	Nominated	
1995	Best Director	The American President	Nominated	

=== Grammy Awards ===
Year	Category	Nominated work	Result	Ref.
1972	Best Comedy Recording	All in the Family	Nominated	

=== Producers Guild of America Awards ===
Year	Category	Nominated work	Result	Ref.
1992	Outstanding Producer of Theatrical Motion Pictures	A Few Good Men	Nominated	
1995	Outstanding Producer of Theatrical Motion Pictures	The American President	Nominated	
2023	Outstanding Producer of Non-Fiction Television	Albert Brooks: Defending My Life	Nominated	

== Miscellaneous Awards ==
Award	Year	Category	Nominated work	Result	Ref.
American Cinema Editors	2009	Golden Eddie Award	—N/a	Won	
David di Donatello	1990	Best Foreign Director	When Harry Met Sally...	Nominated	
Golden Raspberry Awards	1995	Worst Picture	North	Nominated	
Golden Raspberry Awards	1995	Worst Director	North	Nominated	
Hugo Awards	1988	Best Dramatic Presentation	The Princess Bride	Won	
Independent Spirit Awards	1986	Best Director	Stand by Me	Nominated	
National Board of Review	1996	Best Acting by an Ensemble	The First Wives Club	Won	
Seattle Film Critics Society	2014	Best Ensemble Cast	The Wolf of Wall Street	Nominated	
Toronto International Film Festival	1987	People's Choice Award	The Princess Bride	Won	

== Honorary awards ==
Organizations	Year	Notes	Result	Ref.
Film at Lincoln Center	2014	Gala Tribute	Honored	
Hollywood Walk of Fame	1999	Motion Picture Star at 6421 Hollywood Blvd.	Honored	
Santa Barbara International Film Festival	2001	Lifetime Achievement Award	Honored	
WorldFest-Houston International Film Festival	2017	Remi Career Achievement Award	Honored	
