= Rob Reiner =

American filmmaker and actor (1947–2025)

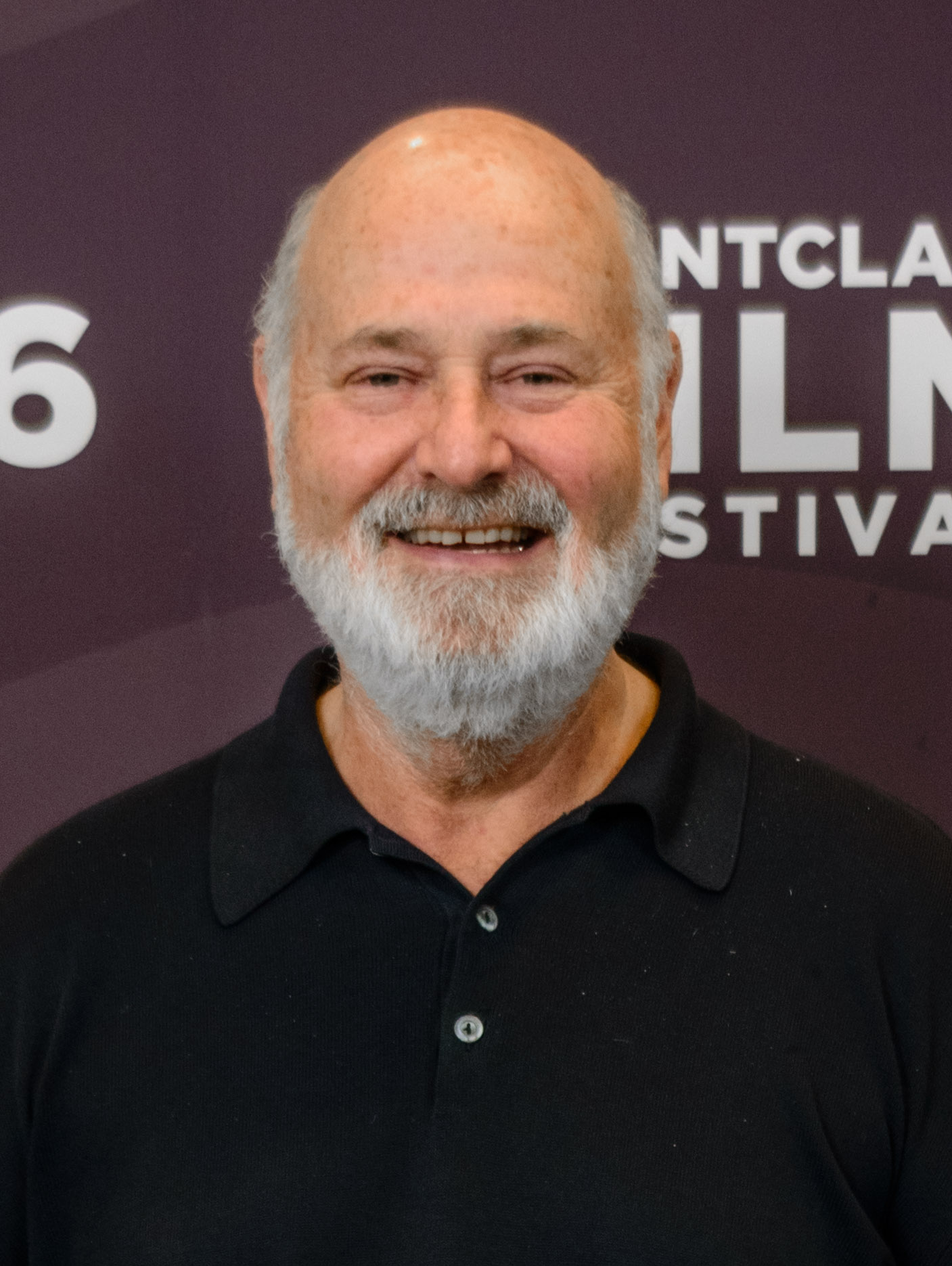
- Reiner in 2016
- Born: Robert Reiner; March 6, 1947; New York City, U.S.
- Died: December 14, 2025 (aged 78); Los Angeles, California, U.S.
- Cause of death: Stab wounds (homicide)
- Occupations: Director; producer; screenwriter; actor; political activist
- Years active: 1966–2025
- Organization: Castle Rock Entertainment
- Political party: Democratic
- Spouses: Penny Marshall (m. 1971; div. 1981) Michele Singer (m. 1989)
- Children: 4, including Tracy
- Parents: Carl Reiner; Estelle Reiner
- Relatives: Lucas Reiner (brother); Annie Reiner (sister)

Robert Reiner (/ˈraɪnər/; March 6, 1947 – December 14, 2025) was an American filmmaker, actor, and political activist. He directed a series of acclaimed studio films in a career that spanned comedy, drama, romance, and documentary. Throughout his 6 decade career, Reiner received numerous accolades, including winning three Primetime Emmy Awards and a Hugo Award, as well as nominations for an Academy Award, a BAFTA Award, and nine Golden Globe Awards. He was honored with a star on the Hollywood Walk of Fame in 1999 and received the Chaplin Gala Tribute at the Film at Lincoln Center in 2014. Three of his films have been inducted into the National Film Registry. (Note: These films are This Is Spinal Tap (1984), The Princess Bride (1987), and When Harry Met Sally... (1989).)

Reiner was born in New York City to actors Estelle and Carl Reiner. Reiner began his career as an actor before transitioning to filmmaking. He rose to prominence with his portrayal of Michael "Meathead" Stivic in the 1970s American sitcom All in the Family (1971–1979), a role that earned him two Primetime Emmy Awards for Outstanding Supporting Actor.

He directed a string of critically acclaimed films, starting with the heavy metal mockumentary This Is Spinal Tap (1984), followed by the romantic road comedy The Sure Thing (1985), the coming-of age drama Stand by Me (1986), the adventure romance The Princess Bride (1987), the romantic comedy When Harry Met Sally... (1989), the psychological thriller Misery (1990), the legal drama A Few Good Men (1992), which was nominated for the Academy Award for Best Picture, and the political romance The American President (1995). He acted in films such as Sleepless in Seattle (1993), Bullets Over Broadway (1994), The First Wives Club (1996), Primary Colors (1998), EDtv (1999), and The Wolf of Wall Street (2013). He also co-founded the production company Castle Rock Entertainment in 1987.

Reiner was also a progressive political activist who advocated for causes such as LGBTQ rights, early childhood education, and environmental protection, and who campaigned for a variety of Democratic candidates. He chaired the 1998 campaign to pass California's First 5 childhood education initiative, and in 2008 he and his wife, Michele, co-founded the American Foundation for Equal Rights, which initiated the court challenge against California's same-sex marriage ban.

On December 14, 2025, Reiner and his wife were found stabbed to death in their Los Angeles home. Their son Nick Reiner has been indicted with two counts of first-degree murder, and the case is ongoing.

== Early life ==
Reiner as a child, from the credits of More Than Friends, a 1978 TV movie co-starring his then-wife Penny Marshall

Robert Reiner was born into a Jewish family in the Bronx, New York City, on March 6, 1947. His parents were the actors Estelle and Carl Reiner. His siblings are poet, playwright, and author Annie Reiner and painter, actor, and director Lucas Reiner. The family lived on the Grand Concourse in the Bronx. Later in his childhood, they moved to New Rochelle, New York. Reiner had no middle name. "My mother didn't have a middle name, my father didn't have one, so they didn't give me one." Carl Reiner loved baseball and took Rob to his first Major League Baseball game in 1951, a doubleheader at Yankee Stadium: "It was Mickey Mantle's first year in the Majors and Joe DiMaggio's last...I was four years old, and I stayed through both games. I was fascinated. I was hooked at that point."

The family eventually moved to Los Angeles, where Reiner made his television acting debut at age 14 on the series Manhunt. In the early 1960s, he served as a trainee and apprentice at the Bucks County Playhouse in New Hope, Pennsylvania. He attended Beverly Hills High School and studied at the UCLA Film School. He was at UCLA for two years, from 1964 to 1966, but did not graduate with a degree.

== Career ==
=== 1966–1969: Early work and acting roles ===
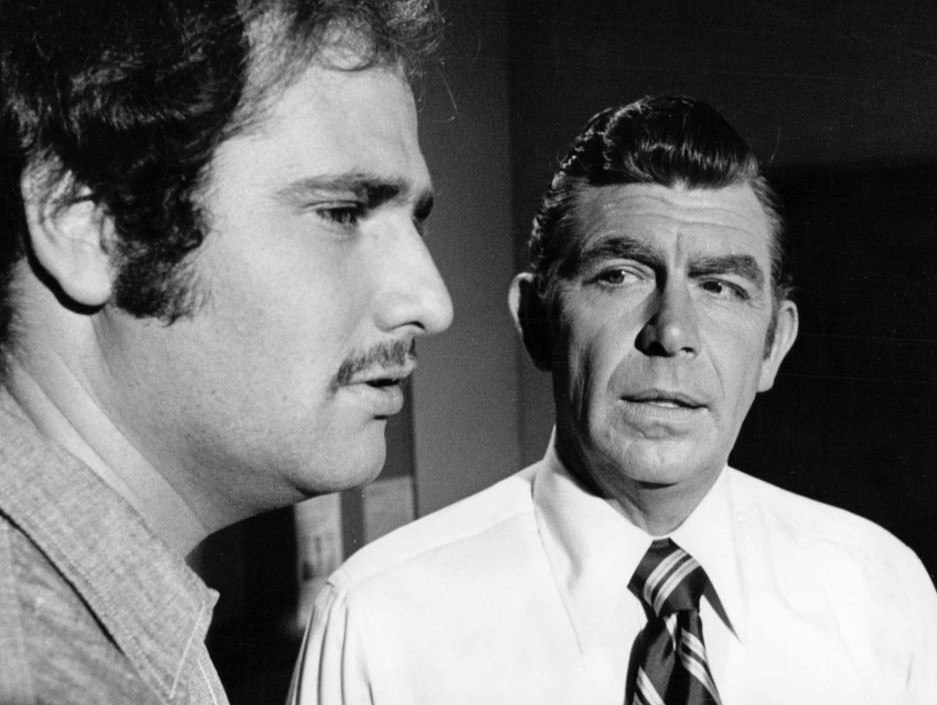
Reiner (left) guest starred opposite Andy Griffith in Headmaster, a series for which he also wrote.

In the late 1960s, Reiner acted in bit roles on several television shows including Batman, That Girl, The Andy Griffith Show, Room 222, Gomer Pyle – USMC, and The Beverly Hillbillies. At age 19, Reiner and actor Larry Bishop were part of an improv group, and performed as the opening act for Carmen McRae at the Hungry I club in San Francisco. He began his career in television writing for The Smothers Brothers Comedy Hour in 1968 and 1969, working alongside Steve Martin and Carl Gottlieb as his writing partners. In 1969 he directed a one-act play at the Oxford Theatre in Los Angeles, and starred in another, both written by his friend Philip Mishkin. During this period, he also appeared in several films, including some directed by his father such as Where's Poppa? (1970). Reiner and Jeff Bridges both had roles in a school desegregation picture from United Artists called Halls of Anger (1970). Also in 1970, Reiner starred in and wrote for Headmaster, providing an opportunity to work again with Andy Griffith, after portraying a printer's assistant in a 1967 episode of The Andy Griffith Show. Headmaster was the first of five TV comedies on which Reiner and frequent writing partner Mishkin collaborated. Headmaster, The Super (1972), Free Country (1978), and Morton & Hayes (1991) were all canceled after one season.

=== 1970–1979: All in the Family and stardom ===
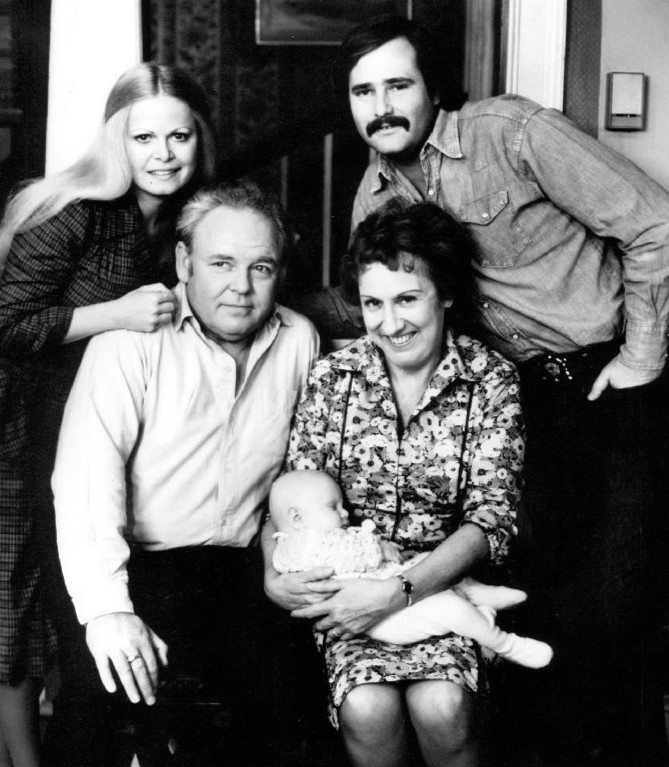
Reiner (top-right, with Sally Struthers, Carroll O'Connor, and Jean Stapleton) as Michael Stivic on All in the Family, 1976

In the 1970s, Reiner became widely known for playing Michael Stivic, Archie Bunker's liberal son-in-law, on Norman Lear's situation comedy All in the Family, which was adapted from the British sitcom Till Death Us Do Part. The series was the most-watched television program in the United States for five consecutive seasons (1971–1976). The character's nickname "Meathead" (given to him by his cantankerous father-in-law Archie) became closely associated with Reiner, even after he left the role and established himself as a director. Reflecting on the enduring association, Reiner remarked, "I could win the Nobel Prize and they'd write 'Meathead wins the Nobel Prize.'" For his performance, Reiner won two Emmy Awards, received three additional nominations, and earned five Golden Globe nominations.

In October 1971, Reiner appeared as a guest in an episode of The Partridge Family. The following year, Reiner, Mishkin, and Gerry Isenberg created the situation comedy The Super for ABC, starring Richard S. Castellano, about the life of a harried Italian-American building superintendent in New York City; the show ran for one season during the summer of 1972. In 1978 Reiner co-wrote an ABC-TV movie called More Than Friends, in which he starred opposite his then-wife Penny Marshall. Early in the film, Reiner's character lamented, "Whaaat? I have no sex appeal? That hurts my feelings. And I'm going to be bald on top of it."

=== 1980–1996: Transition to directing and acclaim ===
Beginning in the 1980s, Reiner established himself as a director of several successful Hollywood films spanning multiple genres. His early works include cult classics such as the rock-band mockumentary This Is Spinal Tap (1984), the coming-of-age drama Stand by Me (1986), and the comedic fantasy The Princess Bride (1987). He also appeared as faux-documentarian Marty Di Bergi in This Is Spinal Tap. He frequently collaborated with film editor Robert Leighton, who also worked on several films with fellow director-actor Christopher Guest.

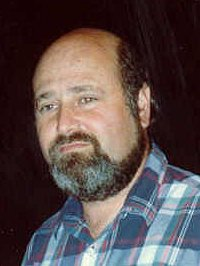
Reiner at the 1988 Emmy Awards

Reiner directed and produced a number of critically and commercially successful films through his company, Castle Rock Entertainment. These include the romantic comedy When Harry Met Sally... (1989), which has been ranked among the all-time best of its genre; the tense thriller adaptation of Stephen King's novel Misery (1990), for which Kathy Bates won the Academy Award for Best Actress; and his most commercially successful work, the military courtroom drama A Few Good Men (1992), which was nominated for the Academy Award for Best Picture. The next film Reiner released through Castle Rock was the family comedy North, which was a box-office bomb and was panned by critics. Roger Ebert, whose extremely negative review of the film became well-known, regarded it as "some sort of lapse" from Reiner. It has since been included on many prominent lists of the worst films ever made.

Subsequent films directed by Reiner include the political romance The American President (1995) and the courtroom drama Ghosts of Mississippi (1996). Reiner continued to act in supporting roles in a number of films and television shows, including Throw Momma from the Train (1987), Sleepless in Seattle (1993), Bullets Over Broadway (1994), and The First Wives Club (1996).

=== 1997–2025: Continued work as a director, later acting roles, and final films ===
Reiner went on to direct films such as The Story of Us (1999) and Alex & Emma (2003), in which he also appeared, and the uplifting comedy The Bucket List (2007). He appeared in the films Primary Colors (1998) and EDtv (1999), and parodied himself with cameos in works such as Dickie Roberts: Former Child Star (2003) and 30 Rock (2010). In 2013, Reiner played Jordan Belfort's father in the Martin Scorsese film The Wolf of Wall Street.

Decades after All in the Family, Reiner returned to television with a recurring role on New Girl (2012–2018) playing Jess's dad Bob Day. His late-career television guest star work also included "politically infused roles" on The Good Fight, When We Rise, and the miniseries Hollywood. He played business consultant Albert Schnur on The Bear (2025), for which he won a posthumous Primetime Emmy Award for Outstanding Guest Actor in a Comedy Series.

In 2015, he directed the semi-autobiographical film Being Charlie, co-written by his son Nick. He directed and played a major supporting role in the journalism drama Shock and Awe (2017). In November 2023, Reiner and journalist Soledad O'Brien launched the ten-part podcast series Who Killed JFK?. In December 2023, Reiner opened the primetime CBS special Dick Van Dyke: 98 Years of Magic with a tribute to, and conversation with, Dick Van Dyke.

His final completed film, Spinal Tap II: The End Continues (2025), was released three months before his death. In August 2025, Reiner filmed Spinal Tap performing at Stonehenge for a concert film, Stonehenge: The Final Finale, with musical guests Eric Clapton, Shania Twain and Josh Groban. Final Finale was planned for a 2026 theatrical release. The film's release was put on hold following Reiner's death.

In 2026 the book Who Killed JFK? Solving America's Greatest Murder Mystery was posthumously released, which Reiner co-wrote with Dick Russell and David Hoffman. It was based off the podcast series on the assassination Reiner co-hosted with Soledad O'Brien.

== Social and political activism ==
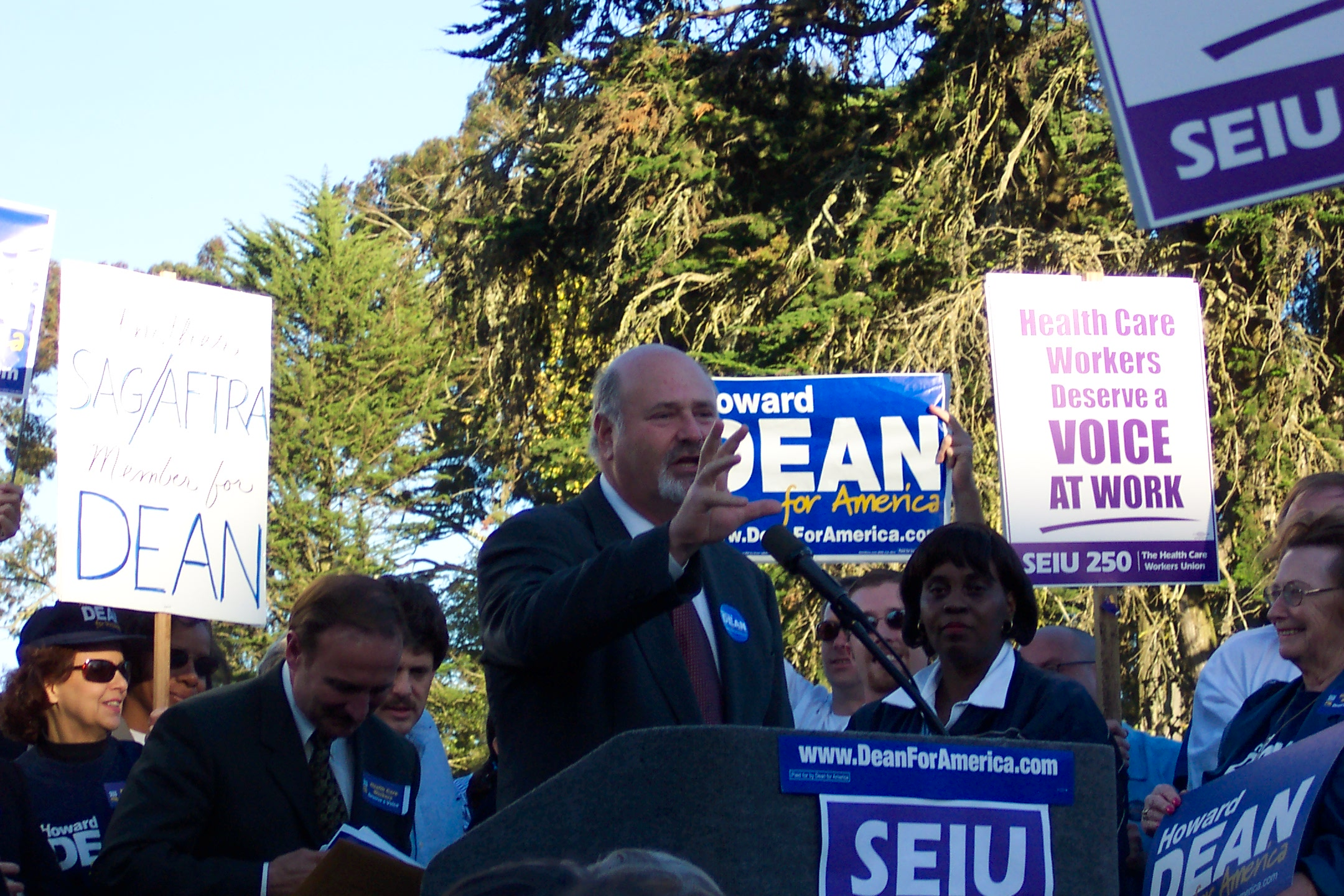
Reiner speaking at a Howard Dean rally on October 29, 2003

Reiner was a progressive activist on a wide range of issues, and an outspoken critic of Donald Trump.

In 1998, Reiner chaired the campaign to pass California Proposition 10, the California Children and Families Initiative, which created First 5 California, a program of early childhood development services funded by a tax on tobacco products. He served as the organization's first chairman from 1999 to 2006. His lobbying, particularly as an anti-smoking advocate, led to his likeness being used satirically in the South Park episode "Butt Out", where he was depicted as a morbidly obese, hypocritical tyrant.

In 2006, Reiner came under criticism for campaigning for California Proposition 82, a ballot measure to fund public preschools, while serving as the chair of the California First 5 Commission. In response to the criticism, he resigned from his position as chair on March 29, 2006, two months before the measure was voted on. An audit later concluded that the commission had not violated state law and had clear legal authority to conduct public advertising campaigns related to preschool. However, the auditor reported that the commission awarded more than $77 million in media contracts without reviewing their costs. Proposition 82 ultimately failed to win approval.

Reiner was a member of the Social Responsibility Task Force, an organization advocating moderation where social issues such as violence and tobacco use intersect with the entertainment industry. He was also active in environmental causes, successfully leading the effort to preserve California's Ahmanson Ranch as a state park and wildlife refuge rather than as a commercial real estate development. In July 2007, he introduced the reunited Spinal Tap at the London Live Earth concert.

In 2009, Reiner co-founded the American Foundation for Equal Rights, which initiated the court challenge against California Proposition 8 that banned same-sex marriage in the state.

=== Democratic Party activism and criticism of Donald Trump ===
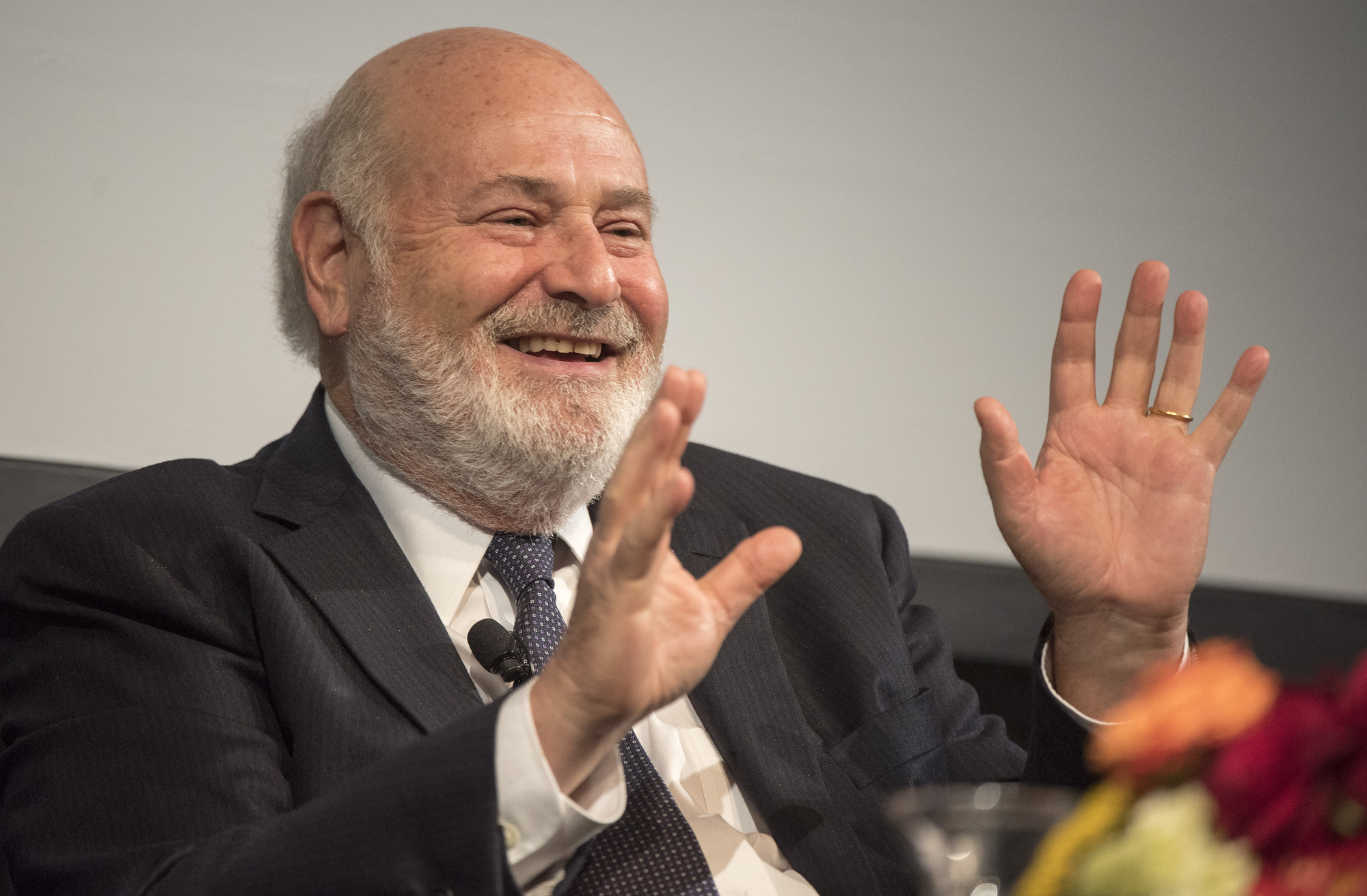
Reiner at the LBJ Presidential Library in 2016

Reiner campaigned extensively for Democratic presidential nominee Al Gore in the 2000 presidential election He campaigned in Iowa for Democratic candidate Howard Dean ahead of the 2004 Iowa caucuses.

In 2006, Reiner was mentioned as a possible candidate to run against California Governor Arnold Schwarzenegger in that years election, but declined for personal reasons. He was quoted as saying "I don't want to be an elected official, I want to get things done."

Reiner endorsed Hillary Clinton in the 2008 election, and in 2015 donated $10,000 to Correct the Record, a political action committee supporting her 2016 presidential campaign.

After the 2016 election, Reiner continued to campaign against Donald Trump, calling him racist, sexist, homophobic, and antisemitic. He remarked that Harvey Weinstein is a "bad guy" but that Trump was "also an abuser". Reiner served on the advisory board of the committee to Investigate Russia. He and David Frum launched the site in September 2017, accompanied by a video narrated by Morgan Freeman warning that "We are at war" and that Russia had attacked the United States. Other advisory board members at the time of launch included James Clapper, Max Boot, Charles Sykes, and Norman Ornstein. The board also included Evelyn Farkas, Michael Hayden, Michael Morrell, Leon Panetta, and Clint Watts.

Reiner endorsed Joe Biden for president in the 2020 United States presidential election. In June 2021, Reiner announced he was developing a television project, The Spy and the Asset, about the relationship between Trump and Vladimir Putin. He said the series would explore the leaders' childhoods and trace their lives up to the point where they intersect. Reiner said he was collaborating with writer Ward Parry on the project.

In September 2025, Reiner gave an interview with CNN, where he spoke out against Trump and the Federal Communications Commission. He said it "may be the last time you ever see me", in reference to the suspension of Jimmy Kimmel Live!

== Personal life ==
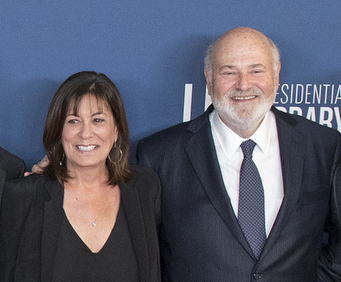
Michele and Rob Reiner at the LBJ Presidential Library for a screening of his film LBJ in 2016

Reiner married actress and director Penny Marshall in 1971. He adopted Marshall's daughter, actress Tracy Reiner, from her previous marriage to Michael Henry. Reiner and Marshall divorced in 1981.

While directing When Harry Met Sally..., Reiner was introduced to photographer Michele Singer. The meeting not only influenced his decision to change the film's ending, but also led to their marriage in 1989. They had three children: sons Jake and Nick, and daughter Romy. Rob and Michele's eldest son, Jake, has been involved in filmmaking and was a news reporter in Houston, Texas. Rob Reiner had season tickets for Dodger Stadium beginning in the 1960s, and he would go to baseball games all around the country with Jake, who had a Dodgers podcast circa 2023. His second son Nick entered the first of a number of stays in drug rehab at the age of 14, cycling "in and out of rehab" subsequently for years. Their youngest child, daughter Romy, is a filmmaker and had a very close relationship with both of her parents.

In 1997, Reiner and Singer founded the I Am Your Child Foundation and, in 2004, they established Parents' Action for Children, a nonprofit organization with a dual purpose of raising awareness of the importance of a child's early years by producing and distributing celebrity-hosted educational videos for parents, and advancing public policy through parental education and advocacy.

Reiner said his childhood home was not observantly Jewish, although he did have a bar mitzvah ceremony. His father, Carl, had become an atheist in response to Hitler and the Holocaust. Reiner identified as an atheist on the January 13, 2012, episode of Real Time with Bill Maher. He later said that, while he rejected organized religion, he was sympathetic to the ideas of Buddhism.

== Death, funeral, and memorial service ==
On December 14, 2025, Reiner, 78, and his wife Michele, 70, (Note: News outlets reported her age as 68 and 70. The County of Los Angeles Medical Examiner's Office lists her age as 70.) were found in their Brentwood, Los Angeles, home at 255 South Chadbourne Avenue, dead from sharp force injuries. The couple's youngest child, Romy, had gone to the house with her roommate after the Reiners' massage therapist informed her that the couple had missed their appointment; she discovered her father's body, but was not aware that her mother was at home, and was later told of her mother's death. The Los Angeles Fire Department responded to a medical aid call at the residence at 3:38 p.m. PST.

The same day, Los Angeles police arrested the Reiners' son Nick, 32, near the University of Southern California on suspicion of murder. Nick had been living with his parents at the time. Rob and Nick had attended a Christmas party hosted by Conan O'Brien on the evening of December 13 and reportedly had an argument. Nick had been disruptive at the party and had made guests feel uneasy. Sources who attended the party but wished to remain anonymous told The New York Times that the loud argument between Nick and Rob started after Rob told him his behavior at the party was not appropriate. On December 16, Nick was charged with two counts of first-degree murder with a special circumstance of multiple murders.

In September 2026, Los Angeles County prosecutors announced that they would not seek the death penalty against Nick Reiner, who was charged with murdering his parents. If convicted, he faces a maximum sentence of life imprisonment without the possibility of parole.

Rob and Michele's other two children, Jake and Romy, released a joint statement on December 17 describing their parents as their "best friends". Close friends and collaborators Albert Brooks, Billy Crystal, Larry David, Martin Short, Barry Levinson, Marc Shaiman, and Alan Zweibel released a joint statement that read in part, "There is no other director who has his range...he was always at the top of his game. He charmed audiences. They trusted him." They also wrote, "Michele and Rob Reiner devoted a great deal of their lives for the betterment of our fellow citizens... They were a special force together—dynamic, unselfish and inspiring. We were their friends, and we will miss them forever". Former U.S. presidents Bill Clinton and Joe Biden also released statements memorializing Reiner and offering condolences to his loved ones. Crystal later appeared at the 98th Academy Awards to pay tribute to Reiner.

The Reiners were cremated at Mount Sinai Memorial Park. Their remains were given to their son Jake for private disposition. Funeral plans for the family were not made public. On December 22, Jake and Romy Reiner issued a statement confirming that they were making plans for a public memorial service and would release details at a future date.

== Legacy and reception ==
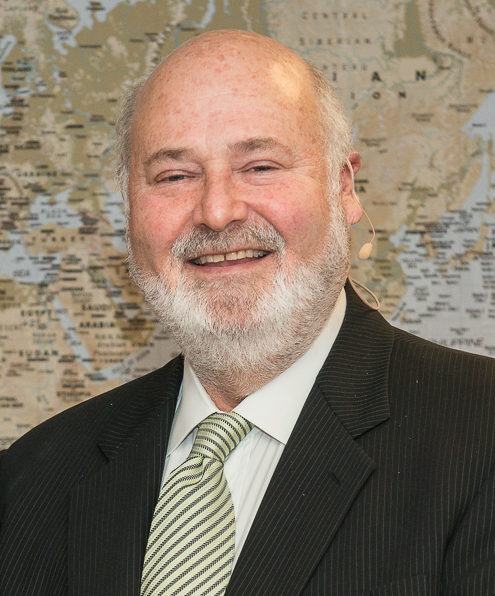
Reiner in 2013

Reiner was a notable figure in the development of mainstream American cinema and television. This Is Spinal Tap popularized the mockumentary genre, and its use of improvisation was revolutionary for a Hollywood film. The movie established conventions that later filmmakers adopted in both cinema and television, particularly in comedy built around realism, parody, and unscripted performance. Its success also contributed to the wider acceptance of mock-documentary formats in mainstream media. It is also considered one of the greatest comedies of all time.

Across the 1980s and 1990s, Reiner directed a series of culturally influential films in multiple genres, including coming-of-age drama Stand by Me, fantasy romance The Princess Bride, and romantic comedy When Harry Met Sally.... The Princess Bride is credited with having numerous phrases enter the regular lexicon.

When Harry Met Sally..., in particular, helped redefine the modern romantic comedy through its balanced focus on male and female perspectives and is considered one of the greatest romantic comedies of all time. Reiner has regularly been cited by critics as having one of the greatest directing streaks in Hollywood with his first seven films. The Bucket List popularized the eponymous term. Three of Reiner's films – When Harry Met Sally..., The Princess Bride and This Is Spinal Tap – have been selected for preservation by the National Film Registry for cultural, historical, and aesthetic contributions.

Following his death, CNN published an article describing how Reiner "changed movies forever by challenging himself as an artist". In its obituary, the Associated Press noted that Reiner was "the son of a comedy giant who became one himself as one of the preeminent filmmakers of his generation".

Beyond his work as a director, Reiner had a significant impact as a producer and studio executive through his production company Castle Rock Entertainment. The company was instrumental in bringing influential film and television projects to a wide audience, most notably Seinfeld, which reshaped expectations of what network television comedy could achieve. Castle Rock also produced several highly regarded films, including The Shawshank Redemption (1994) and The Green Mile (1999), both of which were directed by Frank Darabont and achieved long-term critical and popular recognition.

== Awards and honors ==
Over his career, Reiner earned nominations for an Academy Award, a BAFTA Award, four Golden Globe Awards for Best Director, the Hugo Award for Best Dramatic Presentation (for The Princess Bride), and three Directors Guild of America Awards. In 2014, he received the 41st Annual Chaplin Award from the Film Society of Lincoln Center. In 1999, Reiner was honored with a star on the Hollywood Walk of Fame.

Accolades received by theatrical released features directed by Reiner
Year	Film	Academy Awards		BAFTA Awards		Golden Globe Awards	
Year	Film	Nominations	Wins	Nominations	Wins	Nominations	Wins
1986	Stand by Me	1				2	
1987	The Princess Bride	1					
1989	When Harry Met Sally...	1		2	1	5	
1990	Misery	1	1			1	1
1992	A Few Good Men	4				5	
1995	The American President	1				5	
1996	Ghosts of Mississippi	2				1	
Total		11	1	2	1	19	1

=== Directed Academy Award performances ===
Under Reiner's direction, these actors have received Academy Award wins and nominations for their performances in their respective roles.

Year	Performer	Film	Result	Ref.
Academy Award for Best Actress
1990	Kathy Bates	Misery	Won	
Academy Award for Best Supporting Actor
1992	Jack Nicholson	A Few Good Men	Nominated	
1996	James Woods	Ghosts of Mississippi	Nominated	

== Filmography ==
=== Film ===
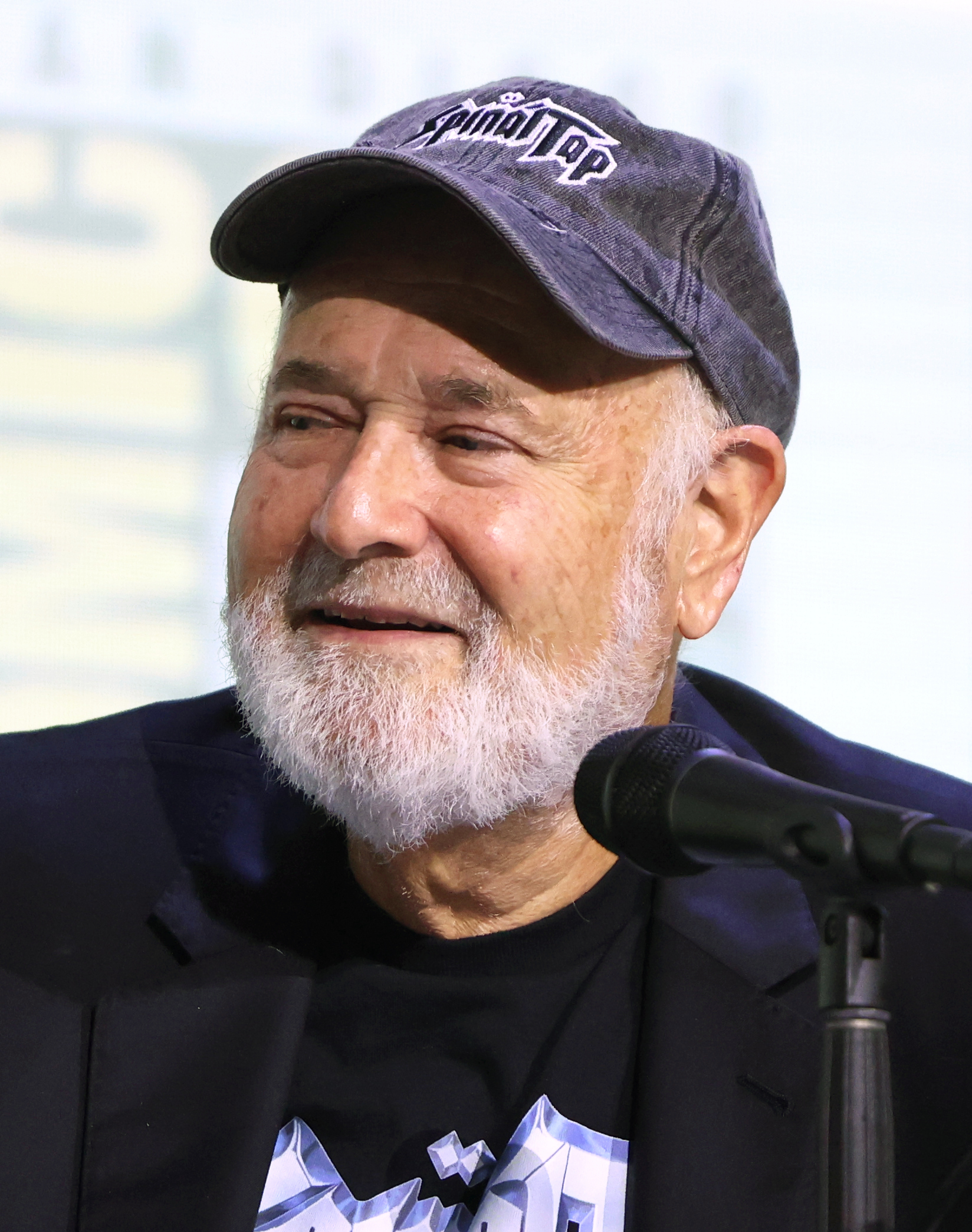
Reiner at the July 2025 San Diego Comic-Con, promoting Spinal Tap II, his last film

Year	Title	Director	Producer	Writer	Ref.
1984	This Is Spinal Tap	Yes	No	Yes	
1985	The Sure Thing	Yes	No	No	
1986	Stand by Me	Yes	No	No	
1987	The Princess Bride	Yes	Yes	No	
1989	When Harry Met Sally...	Yes	Yes	No	
1990	Misery	Yes	Yes	No	
1992	A Few Good Men	Yes	Yes	No	
1994	North	Yes	Yes	No	
1995	The American President	Yes	Yes	No	
1996	Ghosts of Mississippi	Yes	Yes	No	
1997	I Am Your Child	Yes	Yes	Yes	
1999	The Story of Us	Yes	Yes	No	
2003	Alex & Emma	Yes	Yes	No	
2005	Rumor Has It	Yes	No	No	
2007	The Bucket List	Yes	Yes	No	
2010	Flipped	Yes	Yes	Yes	
2012	The Magic of Belle Isle	Yes	Yes	No	
2014	And So It Goes	Yes	Yes	No	
2015	Being Charlie	Yes	Yes	No	
2016	LBJ	Yes	Yes	No	
2017	Shock and Awe	Yes	Yes	No	
2023	Albert Brooks: Defending My Life	Yes	Yes	No	
2024	God & Country	No	Yes	No	
2025	Spinal Tap II: The End Continues	Yes	Yes	Yes	

==== As actor ====
Year	Title	Role	Notes	Ref.
1967	Enter Laughing	Clark Baxter		
1969	Halls of Anger	Leaky Couloris		
1970	Where's Poppa?	Roger		
1971	Summertree	Don		
1977	Fire Sale	Russel Fikus		
1979	The Jerk	Truck Driver Picking Up Navin	Uncredited	
1984	This Is Spinal Tap	Marty DiBergi		
1987	Throw Momma from the Train	Joel		
1990	Postcards from the Edge	Joe Pierce		
1990	Misery	Helicopter Pilot	Uncredited	
1993	Sleepless in Seattle	Jay Mathews		
1994	Bullets Over Broadway	Sheldon Flender		
1994	Mixed Nuts	Dr. Klinsky		
1995	For Better or Worse	Dr. Plosner		
1995	Bye Bye Love	Dr. David Townsend		
1996	The First Wives Club	Dr. Morris Packman		
1996	Mad Dog Time	Albert		
1998	Primary Colors	Izzy Rosenblatt		
1999	EDtv	Mr. Whitaker		
1999	The Muse	Himself		
1999	The Story of Us	Stan		
2001	The Majestic	Studio Executive	Voice role	
2003	Alex & Emma	Wirschafter		
2003	Dickie Roberts: Former Child Star	Himself		
2006	Everyone's Hero	Screwie	Voice role	
2013	The Wolf of Wall Street	Max Belfort		
2014	And So It Goes	Artie		
2017	Sandy Wexler	Marty Markowitz		
2017	Shock and Awe	John Walcott		
2022	Family Squares	Narrator	Voice role	
2025	Spinal Tap II: The End Continues	Marty DiBergi		

=== Television ===
Television writer

Year	Title	Notes	Ref.
1967	The Smothers Brothers Comedy Hour	20 episodes	
1969	The Glen Campbell Goodtime Hour	15 episodes	
1970	Headmaster	Episode: "May I Turn On?"	
1971–1972	All in the Family	4 episodes	
1972	The Super	3 episodes; also creator	
1974	Happy Days	Episode: "All the Way"	
1978	Free Country	2 episodes; also creator	
1991	Morton & Hayes	Creator	

Television movies

Year	Title	Director	Writer	Ref.
1978	More Than Friends	No	Yes	
1981	Likely Stories: Vol. 1	Yes	Yes	
1982	Million Dollar Infield	No	Yes	

==== As actor ====
Year	Title	Role	Notes	Ref.
1966–1967	That Girl	Chuck / Hairdresser / Carl	3 episodes	
1967	Batman	Delivery Boy	Episode: "The Penguin Declines"	
1967	The Andy Griffith Show	Joe, The Printer's Apprentice	Episode: "Goober's Contest"	
1967–1969	Gomer Pyle – USMC	Various	3 episodes	
1969	The Beverly Hillbillies	Mitch	2 episodes	
1970	Room 222	Tony	Episode: "Funny Money"	
1971	The Partridge Family	Snake	Episode: "A Man Called Snake"	
1971–1978	All in the Family	Michael "Meathead" Stivic	Series regular; 182 episodes	
1974	The Odd Couple	Sheldn Stimler, Myrna Turner's boyfriend	Episode: "The Rain in Spain Falls Mainly in Vain"	
1975	Saturday Night Live	Host / Various	Episode: "Rob Reiner"	
1976	The Rockford Files	Larry 'King' Sturtevant	Episode: "The No-Cut Contract"	
1978	Free Country	Joseph Bresner	5 episodes	
1978	More Than Friends	Alan Corkus	Television film	
1979	Archie Bunker's Place	Michael Stivic	Episode: "Thanksgiving Reunion"	
1982	Million Dollar Infield	Monte Miller	Television film	
1987–1990	It's Garry Shandling's Show	Himself	4 episodes	
1991	Morton & Hayes	Narrator	6 episodes	
1994	The Larry Sanders Show	Himself (cameo)	Episode: "Doubt of the Benefit"	
1998	Frasier	Bill (voice)	Episode: "The Maris Counselor"	
2001	Curb Your Enthusiasm	Himself	Episode: "The Thong"	
2006	Studio 60 on the Sunset Strip	Himself	2 episodes	
2006	The Simpsons	Himself (voice)	Episode: "Million Dollar Abie"	
2009	Hannah Montana	Himself (cameo)	Episode: "You Gotta Lose This Job"	
2009	Wizards of Waverly Place	Himself (cameo)	Episode: "Future Harper"	
2010	30 Rock	Rep. Rob Reiner (cameo)	Episode: "Let's Stay Together"	
2010–2023	Real Time with Bill Maher	Guest	8 episodes	
2012–2018	New Girl	Bob Day	10 episodes	
2013	Mel Brooks: Make a Noise	Himself	American Masters documentary	
2014	About a Boy	Bagel Shop Owner	Episode: "About a Vasectomy"	
2014	The Case Against 8	Himself	HBO documentary	
2015	Happyish	Himself	2 episodes	
2015	The Comedians	Himself	Episode: "Misdirection"	
2016	Norman Lear: Just Another Version of You	Himself	American Masters documentary	
2017	When We Rise	Dr. David Blankenhorn	2 episodes	
2017	The History of Comedy	Himself	CNN documentary	
2018	André the Giant	Himself	HBO documentary	
2018–2020	The Good Fight	Judge Josh Brickner	2 episodes	
2019	The Big Interview	Himself	Episode: "Carl and Rob Reiner"	
2020	Hollywood	Ace Amberg	4 episodes	
2020	Home Movie: The Princess Bride	Grandfather / Grandson	2 episodes (as Grandfather); Episode: "Chapter Ten: To the Pain!" (as Grandson)	
2022	Norman Lear: 100 Years of Music & Laughter	Himself	Television special	
2023	Dick Van Dyke 98 Years of Magic	Himself	Television special	
2025	The Bear	Albert Schnur	3 episodes	
2026	Life, Larry and the Pursuit of Unhappiness	George Washington	Episode: "Farewell"	

== Authored books ==
- (co-author) A Fine Line between Stupid and Clever: The Story of Spinal Tap. Simon & Schuster. 2025. ISBN 978-1398549319.
- (co-author) Who Killed JFK? Solving America's Greatest Murder Mystery. Gallery Books. 2026. ISBN 978-1668083871.

== See also ==
- Rob Reiner's unrealized projects
