= The Young Graduates =

1971 film directed by Robert Anderson

- Theatrical release poster
- Directed by: Robert Anderson
- Screenplay by: Dave Dixon
- Story by: Robert Anderson; Terry Anderson
- Produced by: Robert Anderson; Terry Anderson; William M. Anderson
- Starring: Patricia Wymer; Steven Stewart; Gary Rist; Bruno Kirby; Jennifer Ritt; Dennis Christopher; Marly Holiday
- Cinematography: J. Barry Herron; John Toll
- Edited by: William M. Anderson
- Music by: Ray Martin
- Production company: Tempo Enterprises
- Distributed by: Crown International Pictures
- Release date: June 2, 1971
- Running time: 100 minutes
- Country: United States
- Language: English

The Young Graduates is a 1971 American drama film directed by Robert Anderson, and starring Patricia Wymer, Steven Stewart, Gary Rist, Bruno Kirby, Jennifer Ritt, Dennis Christopher and Marly Holiday. The film was released by Crown International Pictures on June 2, 1971.

== Plot ==
Spunky and precocious high school senior Mindy Evans spurns her decent, but frustrated boyfriend Bill and has a fling with teacher Jack Thompson, a hunky nice guy that's married. Mindy finds out that she might be pregnant. While waiting for the results of her pregnancy test, Mindy decides to alleviate the tension by embarking on an impromptu road trip to Big Sur, California with her best girl friend Sandy.

== Cast ==
- Patricia Wymer as Mindy Evans
- Steven Stewart as Jack Thompson
- Gary Rist as Bill
- Bruno Kirby as Les
- Jennifer Ritt as Gretchen Thompson
- Dennis Christopher as Pan
- Marly Holiday as Sandy
- Anthony Mannino
- Robert Almanza as Danny
- Joe Pepe as Lieutenant
- Max Manning as Bartender
- Frances Tremaine as Teacher
- Tom Benko as Reporter
- Pat Russell as And Spare Change
