= Philip Mishkin =

American playwright and TV writer

Philip Mishkin is an American playwright and TV writer who frequently collaborated with Rob Reiner.

== Career ==
Reiner and Mishkin first worked together at UCLA, in an improv group called the Sessions. In 1969 Mishkin wrote two one-act plays that were staged at the Oxford Theatre in Los Angeles, California; Reiner directed one and starred in the other. In 1970, Mishkin and Reiner worked on a one-season TV comedy called The Headmaster, starring Andy Griffith. In 1972 he co-created The Super with Reiner and Gerald Isenberg. Mishkin and Reiner co-wrote the pilot episode, and Mishkin also co-starred as Frankie Girelli.

Mishkin and Reiner co-wrote four episodes of All in the Family. Mishkin was nominated for an Outstanding Writing Achievement in Comedy Emmy Award in 1972 for co-writing an episode of All In the Family. In 1973 Reiner and Mishkin collaborated on a comedy scenario for a TV special featuring Carroll O'Connor. In 1978 Reiner and Mishkin co-created Free Country, "a whimsical dramedy in which Reiner played an 89-year-old Lithuanian immigrant looking back on his fresh-off-the-boat self, also played by Reiner." The same year the Reiner-Mishkin Production Company, associated with Columbia Pictures Television, produced More Than Friends, an ABC TV movie starring Reiner and his then-wife Penny Marshall.

In 1980 the Odyssey Theater Ensemble of Los Angeles staged an adaption of They Shoot Horses Don't They? that was co-written by Mishkin. In 1991 Mishkin and Reiner co-created the one-season CBS show Morton & Hayes.

== See also ==
- List of All in the Family episodes
