= Morton & Hayes =

- Genre: Comedy, Mockumentary
- Created by: Phil Mishkin; Rob Reiner
- Directed by: Christopher Guest; Michael McKean
- Presented by: Rob Reiner
- Starring: Kevin Pollak; Bob Amaral
- Country of origin: United States
- No. of seasons: 1
- No. of episodes: 6

Production
- Running time: 30 minutes
- Production company: Castle Rock Entertainment

Original release
- Network: CBS
- Release: July 24 – August 28, 1991

Morton & Hayes is a comedy television series, shown Wednesday nights at 8:30 on CBS. The series was centered on the "rediscovered" work of a fictitious comedy duo; each episode presented what was purported as a newly-discovered Morton & Hayes comedy short from the late 1930s or early 1940s.

Six episodes were shown from July 24 to August 28, 1991. The series pilot, entitled Partners in Life, aired approximately a year earlier on August 31, 1990, featuring a somewhat modified premise and slightly different cast.

== Format ==
Each 30-minute episode was presented in the style of a documentary, in which host Rob Reiner introduced another long-lost comedy film short starring Chick Morton (Kevin Pollak) and Eddie Hayes (Bob Amaral). The films on the show were supposed to have been produced by (fictional) producer Max King in the late 1930s and early 1940s.

Each black-and-white Morton & Hayes short was played, not as a parody of old-time comedy, but a tribute to it. The films were made to look the way they would have if they'd been authentic, and the comedy was in the style of Abbott and Costello, with lean Morton in the "Abbott" role and plump Hayes as his "Costello."

After each film, Reiner would discuss some of the "behind the scenes" stories about the making of the films, or the actors involved in them. Later episodes featured Reiner interviewing one or more of the actors from the picture (made-up to look decades older, of course). In the final two episodes, Reiner conducted an interview of the "now-elderly" Morton and Hayes, who were reunited on the show after years of estrangement.

== The characters of Morton & Hayes ==
Reiner's interviews revealed much more of the history of Morton & Hayes. Chick Morton was born Albert Mossberg, and Eddie Hayes' real name was Vincenzo Giacomelli. They started in vaudeville sometime in the 1920s doing a magic and singing act ("The Great Vincenzo & Al"), eventually creating the Chick and Eddie personas for which they would gain fame. They worked for producer Max King in the 1930s and 1940s, making over 100 short films and becoming well-known stars whose likenesses were merchandised on everything from coffee mugs to foot pads. Off-screen, Eddie led a quiet life but Chick was a well-known ladies' man, and made headlines in 1943 when he was caught in a "compromising position" with one-time co-star Dorothy Dixon by both his wife (a costume designer) and his mistress (a trapeze artist) during a USO tour.

The duo made numerous films before their contract was terminated with King in 1948; their final film, "Sheeps", had been a financial and critical flop. The team subsequently split up, against Chick's wishes, although they made reunion appearances. Their last appearance was in 1968 on an episode of The Glen Campbell Goodtime Hour. (In real life, this show did not debut until 1969.)

In the years after their break-up, Eddie left show business and became quite wealthy due to investments in real estate. At the same time, Chick's showbiz career faltered (his last credit was an appearance in a 1970s episode of Hawaii Five-O) as he experienced a number of personal difficulties, including four paternity suits and time spent in jail for income tax evasion. ("It was minimum security...we called it Club Fed.") Despite not having talked in over ten years at the time of the Reiner interviews, Chick and Eddie still seem friendly with each other.

== Guests ==
The show used a "rep company" approach to casting, often using the same actors in different roles from episode to episode. Seen frequently in various roles were Christopher Guest (3 episodes, plus the pilot), Raye Birk (2 episodes), and Hamilton Camp (2 episodes). Maria Parkinson and Allison Janney played Chick and Eddie's wives in 2 episodes, though any continuity for their characters beyond the role of "wife" was deliberately ignored. Making one-time appearances in the series were Courteney Cox, Joe Flaherty, Penelope Ann Miller, Catherine O'Hara and Michael McKean. As well, Jennifer Jason Leigh, Wendie Jo Sperber and David L. Lander all appeared as guests in the pilot.

== Pilot ==
A pilot for the series, then called Partners in Life, was shown on August 31, 1990. In this pilot, Kevin Pollak (who would play Chick Morton in the actual series) played Eddie Hayes, while Joe Guzaldo played Chick Morton. As in the series, Reiner introduced the show ... but here in the character of "Max King III", the grandson of the producer of the original Morton & Hayes films. The faux-40s Morton & Hayes film shown in this pilot was in color, not black-and-white, and according to Reiner, the comedy duo was more of a "Hope–Crosby type team“ in this pilot than the Abbott & Costello, Laurel And Hardy, or Olsen & Johnson-like team of the subsequent series.

== Episodes ==
No.	Title	Directed by	Written by	Original release date	Prod. code
0	"Partners in Life: Pilot"	Carl Gottlieb	Dick Blasucci & Joe Flaherty	August 31, 1990	050100
Introduction: Max King III (Rob Reiner) introduces the viewer to Morton and Hayes, and describes the recent discovery and restoration of the team's long-lost films. Film: Chick Morton (Joe Guzaldo) and Eddie Hayes (Kevin Pollak) work as rickshaw drivers, as they try to raise funds to get back to the US from Macau. Featuring Christopher Guest (as "El Supremo"), Jennifer Jason Leigh, Wendie Jo Sperber and David L. Lander. Guest would later play "El Supremo" in the episode "Oafs Overboard".
1	"Daffy Dicks"	Christopher Guest	Phil Mishkin	July 24, 1991	050103
Introduction: Rob Reiner introduces the viewer to Morton (Kevin Pollak) and Hayes (Bob Amaral), and mentions the recent discovery and restoration of the team's long-lost films. Film: Private eyes Morton & Hayes are hired by a rich woman Amelia Von Astor (Catherine O'Hara) who suspects her husband Dr. Von Astor (Christopher Guest) is having an affair. Closing: Reiner talks Morton and Hayes' worldwide popularity, including some of the memorabilia distributed during their heyday. He also mentions some of the team's other film titles, such as "Pardon My Puss", "The Case of the Cranky Corpse", "Mr. and Mrs. Murderer", "Dial 'N' For Nincompoops", and the all-star film "Morton and Hayes Meet Sherlock Holmes at Charlie Chan's House".
2	"The Bride of Mummula"	Christopher Guest	Michael McKean, Christopher Guest	July 31, 1991	050105
Introduction: Rob Reiner discusses Max King's creation of the movie monster "Mummula" ("part mummy and mostly Dracula"). Film: The lads are stranded in a Bavarian village when they are invited by Hunchback Steve (Hamilton Camp) to stay at the nearby castle belonging to Dr. Mummenschvantz (Michael McKean). Once inside they meet the lovely Jody (Penelope Ann Miller), but face a potentially deadly adversary in the form of the doctor's "altar"-ego Mummula. Closing: Reiner talks about Edgar Lang, Jr., the actor that portrayed "Dr. Mummenschvantz". Lang was typecast as "Mummula" for most of his film career. In the 1970s, it is explained, he left acting to devote his life to writing cookbooks.
3	"Society Saps"	Christopher Guest	Dick Blasucci, Christopher Guest	August 7, 1991	050101
Introduction: Reiner explains that audiences living in the Depression often flocked to the movies for films depicting the upper class. Film: Waiters Eddie and Chick are mistaken for society guests at a gala party and win the affection of the rich, homely hostesses. Featured at the party is the 1940s-style big band number "Cold Potatoes", written by Christopher Guest and Michael McKean, and sung by Guest. Closing: Reiner interviews a much older Augie Gibbons (Christopher Guest), the bandleader that appeared in "Society Saps". Gibbons talks about his career as a baseball player, and why he quit show business. Augie then unsuccessfully attempts to dance "The Cold Potato".
4	"Oafs Overboard"	Christopher Guest	Max Pross, Tom Gammill	August 14, 1991	050106
Introduction: Reiner discusses how "Oafs Overboard" borrows from stories such as "Beauty and the Beast" and "Remembrance of Things Past". Film: Forced to walk the plank by the dastardly "El Supremo" (Christopher Guest), stowaways Chick and Eddie wind up being prepared as human sacrifices on a mysterious island ruled by Vassar-educated native princess Lucy (Courteney Cox). Lucy has a splashy musical number entitled "Ooloo" -- though Cox is clearly lip-synching to someone else's (uncredited) singing. Similarly, Chick and Eddie "sing" (i.e. lip-synch) "I'm In The Mood For Love", and their theme song "Friends"; Closing: Reiner talks about Dorothy Dixon (the actress who portrayed Lucy Lakahakamakawaka in "Oafs Overboard"). Dixon was involved in a Hollywood scandal with Chick Morton, which damaged her career.
5	"The Vase Shop"	Christopher Guest	Dick Blasucci, Joe Flaherty	August 21, 1991	050102
Introduction: Reiner explains that Morton and Hayes would often reuse Vaudeville skits (such as the "Doughnut Bit") in their films. Film: The lads are inexplicably left in charge of an antique vase shop. Episode co-writer Joe Flaherty has a cameo as a thug. Closing: Reiner reunites Chick and Eddie, who have not seen each other in over twenty years. They discuss Chick's "adventurous" life, and the team's Vaudeville career.
6	"Home Buddies"	Michael McKean	Max Pross, Tom Gammill	August 28, 1991	050104
Introduction: Reiner talks about Madge Swane and Babe Carol, two Shakespearean trained actresses that usually portrayed the wives of Morton and Hayes in their films. Film: While their overbearing wives visit their mothers, Chick and Eddie win millions in a radio contest. Closing: Reiner continues his interview with Chick and Eddie. Chick talks about his friend and fellow comedian Red O'Brien, and the many wise investments Eddie made over the years. They discuss their last film (the box office bomb "Sheeps"), and a short-lived second Morton and Hayes (Chick Morton and Helen Hayes).

== Reception ==
The Associated Press wrote that the show was "a bad B movie" and "at least, though, it has potential to improve."

== See also ==
- This Is Spinal Tap, another "mockumentary" from many of the creative staff behind Morton & Hayes, including Rob Reiner, Christopher Guest and Michael McKean.
- Garth Marenghi's Darkplace, a British show with a similar show-within-a-show format.
