= John Kirby (actor) =

American actor and acting coach (1950/1951–2026)

- Born: 1950 or 1951
- Died: July 15, 2026 (aged 75)
- Occupations: Actor; acting coach
- Years active: 1965–2024
- Parent: Bruce Kirby (father)
- Relatives: Bruno Kirby (brother)

John Kirby (1950 or 1951 – July 15, 2026) was an American actor and acting coach. He was known for playing Frank, the bartender in the American drama miniseries Nutcracker: Money, Madness and Murder.

== Life and career ==
Kirby worked as an acting coach for films such as Peter Pan and The Chronicles of Narnia: The Lion, the Witch and the Wardrobe, and was a frequent collaborator of Jim Caviezel. He guest-starred in television programs including Maude, Sanford and Son, The Fall Guy, Eight Is Enough, Airwolf and M*A*S*H, and also in films such as Almost Summer and Dracula's Dog.

In 2023, Kirby was diagnosed with ALS. He died from the disease on July 15, 2026, at the age of 75.
