= Renée Lippin =

American actress

- Born: July 26, 1946 (age 79); New York City, New York, U.S.
- Occupation: Actress
- Years active: 1972–1998
- Spouse: Allan Leicht
- Children: 3

Renée Lippin (born July 26, 1946) is an American retired actress. She appeared periodically on The Bob Newhart Show as Michelle Nardo, one of Dr. Hartley's patients on the television series. Lippin also guest starred on several other television series as well as appearing in feature films in the 1970s to 1990s. She and her husband, Dr. Allan Leicht, have three children.

== Filmography ==
Year	Title	Role	Notes
1972	Portnoy's Complaint	Hannah Portnoy	Feature film
1972	Emergency!	Rosemary	Season 2, Episode 5 "Peace Pipe"
1972–1976	The Bob Newhart Show	Michelle Nardo	TV series, multiple episodes
1976–1977	Rhoda	Allison Levy / Marcia	TV series, episodes: "Love for Sale" and "Together Again for the First Time"
1978	Free Country	Ida Gewertzman	TV series
1980	Stardust Memories	Sandy's Press Agent	Feature film
1984	Fantasy Island	Carla	TV series, episode: "The Awakening of Love/The Impostor"
1987	Mariah	Linda Grincato	TV series
1987	Radio Days	Aunt Ceil	Feature film
1992	This Is My Life	Arlene	Feature film
1993	Mr. Wonderful	Hannah	Feature film
1995	Frasier	Kari	TV series, episode: "Someone to Watch Over Me"
1996	That Thing You Do!	Beautician	Feature film
1998	Celebrity	Patient	Feature film
