= William M. Anderson =

Irish film editor (1948–2022)

William Mills Anderson
- Born: 12 March 1948; Belfast, Northern Ireland
- Died: 4 January 2022 (aged 73); Los Angeles, United States of America
- Other name: Bill Anderson
- Occupation: Film editor

William Mills Anderson (12 March 1948 – 4 January 2022) was a film editor from Northern Ireland, who was nominated for the BAFTA Award for Best Editing for the film Dead Poets Society (1989). He had an extended, notable association with the director Peter Weir, beginning with the film Gallipoli (1981), including Dead Poets Society (1989), and continuing through to The Truman Show (1998). Anderson was born in Belfast, Northern Ireland.

== Filmography ==
Editor
Year	Film	Director	Notes
1970	Cindy and Donna	Robert Anderson	First collaboration with Robert Anderson
1971	The Young Graduates	Robert Anderson	Second collaboration with Robert Anderson
1972	The Adventures of Barry McKenzie	Bruce Beresford	First collaboration with Bruce Beresford
1974	Barry McKenzie Holds His Own	Bruce Beresford	Second collaboration with Bruce Beresford
1975	Aaron Loves Angela	Gordon Parks Jr.	
1976	Don's Party	Bruce Beresford	Third collaboration with Bruce Beresford
1977	The Getting of Wisdom	Bruce Beresford	Fourth collaboration with Bruce Beresford
1978	Money Movers	Bruce Beresford	Fifth collaboration with Bruce Beresford
1980	Breaker Morant	Bruce Beresford	Sixth collaboration with Bruce Beresford
1980	The Club	Bruce Beresford	Seventh collaboration with Bruce Beresford
1981	Gallipoli	Peter Weir	First collaboration with Peter Weir
1981	Puberty Blues	Bruce Beresford	Eighth collaboration with Bruce Beresford
1982	The Year of Living Dangerously	Peter Weir	Second collaboration with Peter Weir
1983	Tender Mercies	Bruce Beresford	Ninth collaboration with Bruce Beresford
1984	Stanley	Esben Storm	
1984	Razorback	Russell Mulcahy	
1985	King David	Bruce Beresford	Tenth collaboration with Bruce Beresford
1987	Big Shots	Robert Mandel	
1988	1969	Ernest Thompson	
1989	Dead Poets Society	Peter Weir	Third collaboration with Peter Weir
1989	Old Gringo	Luis Puenzo	
1990	A Shock to the System	Jan Egleson	
1990	Green Card	Peter Weir	Fourth collaboration with Peter Weir
1991	At Play in the Fields of the Lord	Héctor Babenco	
1992	1492: Conquest of Paradise	Ridley Scott	
1993	Fearless	Peter Weir	Fifth collaboration with Peter Weir
1994	City Slickers II: The Legend of Curly's Gold	Paul Weiland	
1995	Just Cause	Arne Glimcher	
1996	Down Periscope	David S. Ward	
1998	The Truman Show	Peter Weir	Sixth collaboration with Peter Weir
2000	Ordinary Decent Criminal	Thaddeus O'Sullivan	
2002	Igby Goes Down	Burr Steers	
2004	If Only	Gil Junger	
2005	Aegis	Junji Sakamoto	
2006	.45	Gary Lennon	
2007	Snow Angels	David Gordon Green	
2007	Say It in Russian	Jeff Celentano	
2007	Midnight Eagle	Izuru Narushima	
2008	Assassination of a High School President	Brett Simon	
2008	While She Was Out	Susan Montford	

Editorial department
Year	Film	Director	Role
1990	RoboCop 2	Irvin Kershner	Supervising editor
1992	Turtle Beach	Stephen Wallace	Supervising editor

Producer
Year	Film	Director	Credit
1970	Cindy and Donna	Robert Anderson	Associate producer
1971	The Young Graduates	Robert Anderson	Associate producer

Sound department
Year	Film	Director	Role	Notes
1978	The Chant of Jimmie Blacksmith	Fred Schepisi	Sound editor	
1978	Money Movers	Bruce Beresford	Dubbing editor	
1980	Breaker Morant	Bruce Beresford	Sound editor	Uncredited
1985	The Little Sister	Jan Egleson	Sound editor	

Documentaries

Editor
Year	Film	Director
1976	The Crew	Donald McAlpine

Editorial department
Year	Film	Director	Role
2008	Traces of the Trade: A Story from the Deep North	Katrina Browne; Alla Kovgan; Jude Ray	Supervising editor

TV movies

Editor
Year	Film	Director
1976	The Understudy	Eric Luithle
1977	5 Weeks in a Balloon	Chris Cuddington
1985	A Time to Live	Rick Wallace
1988	Ollie Hopnoodle's Haven of Bliss	Dick Bartlett

TV series

Editor
Year	Title	Notes
1974	The Evil Touch	2 episodes
2004	Frontline/World	2 episodes

Editorial department
Year	Title	Role	Notes
2008	POV	Supervising editor	1 episode

== See also ==
- List of film director and editor collaborations
