= Free Country (TV series) =

- Genre: Sitcom
- Created by: Rob Reiner; Phil Mishkin
- Starring: Rob Reiner; Judith Kahan; Renée Lippin; Fred McCarren
- Country of origin: United States
- Original language: English
- No. of seasons: 1
- No. of episodes: 5

Production
- Running time: 30 minutes
- Production companies: Reiner-Mishkin Productions; Columbia Pictures Television

Original release
- Network: ABC
- Release: June 24 – July 22, 1978

Free Country is an American sitcom that aired on ABC in the summer of 1978. The series was created by Rob Reiner and his writing partner Philip Mishkin. The show starred Rob Reiner as Joseph Bresner, the head of a Lithuanian family that emigrated to New York City in the early 1900s. Each episode featured the 89-year-old Bresner in the present day (i.e., in the 1970s) reminiscing about events in the early 1900s. The bulk of the show would then consist of actually showing those events. The series lasted five episodes. Makeup artist Stan Winston designed the prosthetics to age Reiner.

== Cast ==
- Rob Reiner . . . Joseph Bresner
- Judith Kahan . . . Anna Bresner
- Fred McCarren . . . Sidney Gewertzman
- Renée Lippin . . . Ida Gewertzman
- Larry Gelman . . . Leo Gold
- Joe Pantoliano . . . Louis Peschi

== Episode list ==
No.	Title	Directed by	Written by	Original release date
1	"Anna's Arrival"	Hal Cooper	Story by : Rob Reiner & Phil Mishkin; Teleplay by : Earl Pomerantz	June 24, 1978
2	"Anna's Adjustment"	Unknown	Unknown	July 1, 1978
3	"Citizenship"	Unknown	Unknown	July 8, 1978
4	"When Already?"	Unknown	Unknown	July 15, 1978
5	"Special Delivery"	Unknown	Unknown	July 22, 1978
