= The Super (TV series) =

- Genre: Sitcom
- Created by: Gerald I. Isenberg; Rob Reiner; Phil Mishkin
- Directed by: Alan Rafkin
- Starring: Richard S. Castellano
- Country of origin: United States
- Original language: English
- No. of seasons: 1
- No. of episodes: 12 (2 unaired)

Production
- Executive producer: Charles Fries
- Producer: Alan Rafkin
- Running time: 30 minutes
- Production company: Metromedia

Original release
- Network: ABC
- Release: June 21 – August 23, 1972

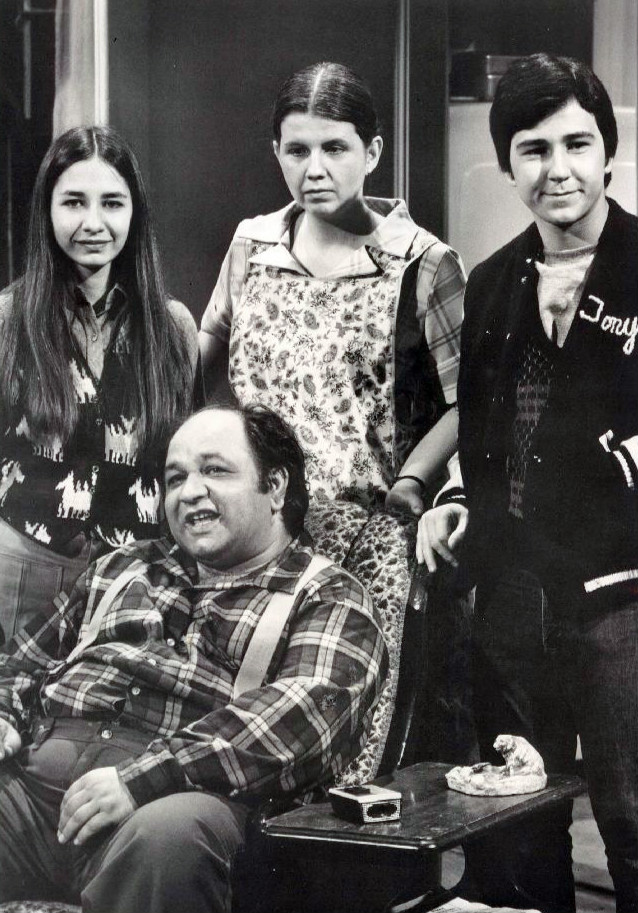
Richard S. Castellano (seated) as Joe Girelli in The Super in 1972. Standing left to right are Margaret Castellano as Joanne Girelli, Ardell Sheridan as Francesca Girelli, and Bruno Kirby as Anthony Girelli.

The Super is an American sitcom television series starring Richard S. Castellano which centers on the superintendent of an apartment building in New York City. The show aired on ABC from June 21 to August 23, 1972.

== Cast ==
- Richard S. Castellano as Joe Girelli
- Ardell Sheridan as Francesca Girelli
- Margaret Castellano as Joanne Girelli
- Bruno Kirby as Anthony Girelli
- Phil Mishkin as Frankie Girelli
- Ed Peck as Officer Clark
- Virginia Vincent as Dottie Clark
- Janet Brandt as Mrs. Stein
- Louis Basile as Louis

== Synopsis ==
Joe Girelli, the Italian-American superintendent (or "super") of an apartment building in a lower-middle-class section of New York City, is a big man (260 pounds; 118 kg) who prefers to be left alone so that he can drink beer while watching television. However, he rarely gets left alone. His family – wife Francesca, daughter Joanne, son Anthony, and brother Frankie, a big-shot lawyer – continually bothers him, the building's tenants are constantly banging on the pipes and complaining about him and one another, and city officials always are trying to condemn his building. His children are disrespectful toward him, and an endless series of ethnic and cultural disputes break out among the tenants, which include political revolutionaries, homosexuals, social workers, and police officers, and Italian Americans, Irish Americans, Polish Americans, Jewish Americans, African Americans, and Puerto Ricans.

== Production notes ==
After CBS's All in the Family debuted in 1971, both NBC and ABC tried to emulate its success with situation comedies similarly centered on blue-collar families. NBC's show, Sanford and Son, premiered in January 1972 and became a major hit. For ABC, meanwhile, Rob Reiner, Phil Mishkin, and Gerry Isenberg created The Super, which premiered in June 1972. Reiner and Mishkin wrote the show's first episode.

Mishkin appeared in The Super as Frankie Girelli, while Richard Castellano's real-life daughter Margaret played Joe Girelli's daughter Joanne. Coincidentally, Richard Castellano and Bruno Kirby, who played Joe Girelli's son Anthony in The Super, both portrayed Pete Clemenza in the Godfather movies, Castellano in The Godfather in 1972 and Kirby as Clemenza as a younger man in The Godfather Part II in 1974.

== Broadcast history and cancellation ==
The Super aired on ABC at 8:00 p.m. Eastern Time on Wednesday throughout its brief run. It never gained the audience that All in the Family and Sanford and Son did, and was cancelled after only 10 episodes had aired; its eleventh and twelfth episodes, preempted by television coverage of the 1972 Summer Olympic Games on August 30 and September 6, 1972, respectively, were never broadcast.

== Episodes ==
No.	Title	Directed by	Written by	Original release date
1	"The Super's Apprentice"	Alan Rafkin	Phil Mishkin & Rob Reiner	June 21, 1972
After Anthony is suspended from school, Francesca suggests that Joe spend more time with him, so Joe decides to teach him a trade by putting him to work as his apprentice – with disastrous results that convince Anthony to return to school. Meanwhile, Joe responds to complaints about smells emanating from an apartment and finds it inhabited by hoarders living in filthy conditions.
2	"The Automated Super"	Unknown	Carl Gottlieb	June 28, 1972
Joe loses his superintendent job, and things look bleak for him until the tenants rebel. Meanwhile, a tenant, Monica, has been late on the rent for two years and is about to be evicted because her boyfriend, Jimmy, spends his time ranting at the neighbors instead of paying the bills.
3	"The Matchmaker"	Unknown	Phil Mishkin & Rob Reiner	July 5, 1972
Joe tries to fix up his spaghetti-plate brother Frankie with a lox-and-bagel tenant. Meanwhile, a tenant, Quanda, violates Section 8 housing rules by letting her friend Krista live in her basement and is in danger of losing her home after Krista, her husband, and their seven children move in and refuse to leave. Penny Marshall guest-stars.
4	"This Building is Condemned"	Unknown	Unknown	July 12, 1972
The property management company that employs Joe takes over the Colbert, a classic building in downtown Omaha, Nebraska, that is in violation of the building code and deemed unsafe – and has just three days to bring the building up to code, something the previous managers could not do in two years of work.
5	"Joe's Scheme"	Unknown	Mickey Rose	July 19, 1972
The property management company that employs Joe is hired to manage a building in which one of the tenants is two months late on her rent, and when Joe informs her that she is to be evicted, she calls the police and her daughter.
6	"Joe's Affair" or "Flesh on the Fifth Floor""	Unknown	Unknown	July 26, 1972
Joe fights temptation after a sexy divorcee moves into the building and invites him to lunch.
7	"Facts of Life"	Unknown	Phil Mishkin & Rob Reiner	August 2, 1972
The teenaged Joanne becomes curious about sex, and Joe is uncomfortable with the prospect of explaining it to her and cancels her first date.
8	"The Plague"	Unknown	Ron Friedman	August 9, 1972
After Anthony is covered with red spots, Joe diagnoses his affliction as the bubonic plague, the tenants say he has the German measles, and the health authorities quarantine the entire building.
9	"The Fat Cop"	Unknown	Robert E. Hodge & Ardell Sheridan	August 16, 1972
Wanting to regain some of his youthful looks, Joe goes on a crash diet, but he finds the odds of him losing weight stacked against him.
10	"Joe's Extra Ticket"	Unknown	Mickey Rose	August 23, 1972
Joe has an extra ticket to a sold-out foounknownll game, and suddenly everyone is his friend.
11	TBA	N/A	N/A	Unaired; preempted by 1972 Summer Olympics, August 30, 1972
12	TBA	N/A	N/A	Unaired; preempted by 1972 Summer Olympics, September 6, 1972
