= Rob Reiner's unrealized projects =

During his long career, American film director and producer Rob Reiner (1947–2025) worked on several projects which never progressed beyond the pre-production stage under his direction. Some of these projects fell in development hell, were officially canceled or would see life under a different production team.

== 1980s ==
=== Singing Out Loud ===
In a 1987 profile for The New York Times, one of Reiner's upcoming projects was revealed to be an original screen musical. "I'm collaborating with Bill Goldman on that," Reiner added. The project was actively developed as his next film from December 1990 to January 1991. Titled Singing Out Loud, it originated from an idea conceived by Reiner. Stephen Sondheim was to write the music, and Castle Rock Entertainment was to produce, but it never materialized. Three of Sondheim's songs were recorded for audio CDs.

== 1990s ==
=== Untitled Angela Davis biopic ===
On February 22, 1993, it was reported that Reiner was set to produce and possibly direct Castle Rock's planned biopic of '60s radical Angela Davis based on her autobiography, with Lynn Whitfield starring.

=== Into the Woods ===
In the mid-1990s, Reiner was preparing to direct an adaptation of the Stephen Sondheim musical Into the Woods, from a script by Lowell Ganz and Babaloo Mandel. A read-through was held, with Robin Williams, Cher, Steve Martin, Goldie Hawn, and Danny DeVito in various parts, but the project never came to fruition.

=== Untitled thriller film ===
On August 26, 1999, it was reported that Reiner was to produce and direct an untitled original thriller, scripted by Tony Gayton, about two high school students who commit a series of perfectly planned murders and then attempt to thwart an FBI agent working her first field case. The project was conceived from an idea by Reiner, who was producing with Richard Crystal through Castle Rock Entertainment.

== 2000s ==
=== The Polar Express film ===
On October 30, 2000, Castle Rock Entertainment and Playtone Co. hired Malia Scotch Marmo to adapt Chris Van Allsburg's picture book The Polar Express as a directing vehicle for Reiner. Tom Hanks was signed on to star in and produce the film at this time. The project was later adapted by Robert Zemeckis using motion capture technology, with Hanks still attached.

=== Everyday Life TV pilot ===
On February 29, 2004, Reiner was set to executive produce and direct Everyday Life, an improv comedy series about a family of psychologists, with Reiner and Mercedes Ruehl cast as the leads after NBC gave the pilot order.

=== Whiskey River ===
On August 28, 2005, Reiner was set to direct politician and author Jim Webb's medical drama Whiskey River, with John Patrick Shanley writing the screenplay and Alan Greisman and Webb producing with Reiner for Warner Bros.

=== Travel Writing ===
On October 16, 2008, Reiner was set to direct the film adaptation of Peter Ferry's novel Travel Writing with Lou Berney writing the screenplay, and Alan Greisman and Reiner producing through Castle Rock and Warner Bros. set to distribute.

=== Book of Shadows ===
On October 20, 2008, Reiner was possibly set to direct Zoe Green's screenplay Book of Shadows with Alan Greisman and Reiner producing through Castle Rock and Warner Bros. set to distribute.

== 2010s ==
=== El Fuego Caliente ===
On February 23, 2011, Reiner was set to produce a remake of Michael Hoffman's Soapdish with Ben Schwartz writing the screenplay and Alan Greisman producing for Paramount Pictures. Schwartz's draft, titled El Fuego Caliente, was featured on The Black List later that year.

=== Untitled Two-Gun Cohen biopic ===
On March 21, 2011, Reiner was set to produce a Two-Gun Cohen biopic with Matt Brown writing the screenplay, Doug Liman set to direct and Alan Greisman producing in collaboration with the Chinese company Galloping Horse.

=== Untitled Proposition 8 film ===
On November 6, 2011, The Hollywood Reporter announced that Reiner was developing a film based on the legal challenge to Proposition 8, the California initiative that banned same-sex marriage and was found unconstitutional by a federal district court judge.

=== Airtight ===
The Hollywood Reporter additionally revealed in November 2011 Reiner's plans to direct a heist film called Airtight, which he was said to be interested in tackling just because he had never done that kind of film before.

=== You Belong to Me ===
On June 22, 2012, Reiner was set to direct David Murray's psychological thriller You Belong to Me with Alan Greisman producing with Richard Lewis' Southpaw Entertainment and Scott Steindorff's Stone Village.

=== Basket Case TV series ===
On December 11, 2013, Reiner was set to direct and produce the television series adaptation of Carl Hiaasen's novel Basket Case, with Alex Taub attached to write the series for Spike TV.

=== The Tap TV series ===
On August 13, 2014, Reiner was set to direct the pilot of Aaron Tracy and Andrew Lenchewski's Yale University thriller television series The Tap for USA Network with Reiner producing the series, along with Alan Greisman, Charlie Ebersol, Lenchewski and Tracy through Universal Cable Productions. On April 7, 2015, the show was in active development, leading to a pilot order from USA Network on August 8, 2016, but on June 19, 2017, The Tap pilot was passed over.

=== The Global War on Morris TV series ===
On February 9, 2015, Reiner was set to direct and produce the comedy television series adaptation of Steve Israel's novel The Global War on Morris with Andrew Lenchewski attached to write the series for USA Network.

== 2020s ==
=== The Spy and the Asset TV series ===
On June 30, 2021, in an interview for SiriusXM, Reiner revealed that he was working on a "10 to 13-episode" TV project about the relationship between Donald Trump and Vladimir Putin, called The Spy and the Asset. Reiner was collaborating on the project with writer Ward Perry.

=== Spinal Tap II: The End Continues sequels ===
When asked about further sequels to Spinal Tap, Reiner said he had "one idea [he] might try" and adapt into a screenplay, but noted that he "[has] to enjoy the process" in order for it to happen.

== Offers ==
=== The Shawshank Redemption ===
In the 1990s, Reiner offered to be the alternate director of Frank Darabont's screenplay The Shawshank Redemption, adapted from Stephen King's short story "Rita Hayworth and Shawshank Redemption", but Darabont stayed on. The film was released in 1994, produced by Reiner's company Castle Rock Entertainment.

=== Harry Potter ===
On September 22, 1999, Reiner was offered to direct J.K. Rowling's Harry Potter series, along with Chris Columbus who would eventually direct the first two movies.
