= More Than Friends (1978 film) =

1978 American TV movie

- Written by: Rob Reiner & Philip Mishkin
- Directed by: Jim Burrows
- Starring: Penny Marshall; Rob Reiner; Kay Medford; Phillip R. Allen; Dabney Coleman; Fawne Harriman; Howard Hesseman; Michael McKean; Claudette Nevins; Joe Pantoliano
- Music by: Fred Karlin

Production
- Cinematography: Jack Swain & Sol Negrin
- Editor: Lee Burch
- Running time: 104 minutes

Original release
- Network: ABC
- Release: October 20, 1978

More Than Friends was a 1978 ABC TV movie starring Penny Marshall as Maddy Perlman and Rob Reiner as Adam Corkus, a woman and man who maintain a connection from 1958 to 1971. The couple initially meet in high school in the Bronx, New York, later he becomes a schoolteacher and she works as an actress. Marshall and Reiner were married in real life when they made the movie. Reiner and his frequent writing partner Phil Mishkin wrote the teleplay and served as executive producers. The film was initially broadcast on October 20, 1978. The running time was 104 minutes.

== Reception ==
The UPI reviewer was concerned that the film treated premarital sex casually and normalized living together before marriage.

== See also ==
- List of television films produced for American Broadcasting Company
- When Harry Met Sally... (1989)
