= Bruce Kirby (actor) =

American actor (1925–2021)

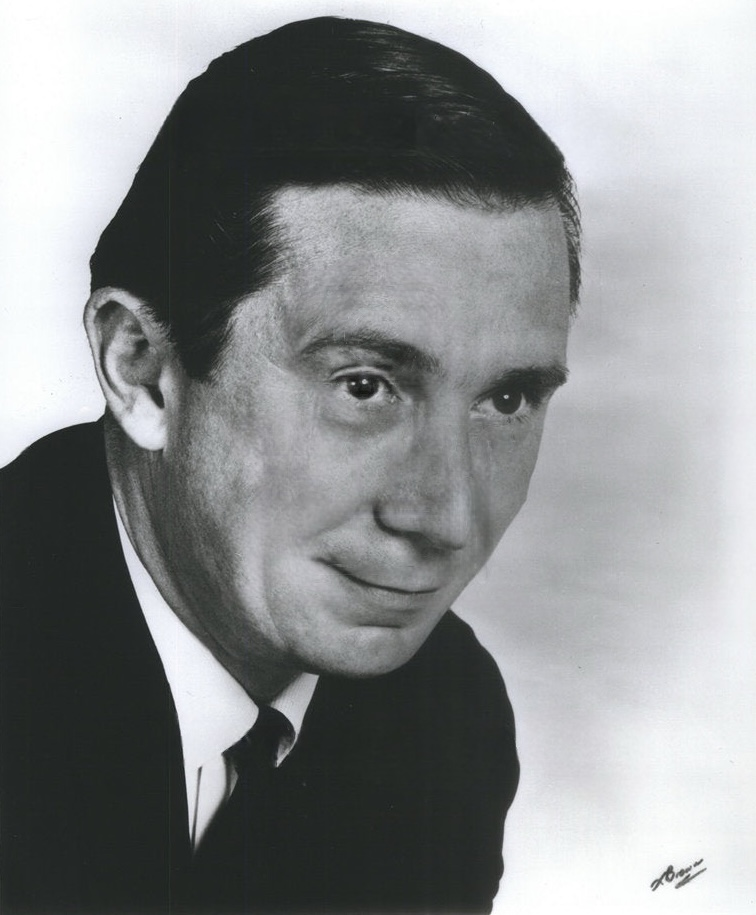
- Kirby in 1969
- Born: Bruno Giovanni Quidaciolu; April 28, 1925; New York City, U.S.
- Died: January 24, 2021 (aged 95); Los Angeles, California, U.S.
- Occupation: Actor
- Years active: 1950–2009
- Spouses: Lucille Garibaldi (m. 1948; div. 1973); Rosalyn Heischuber (m. 1976)
- Children: Bruno Kirby and John Kirby

Bruce Kirby (born Bruno Giovanni Quidaciolu; April 28, 1925 – January 24, 2021) was an American character actor.

== Career ==
Bruce Kirby started his television career in the 1950s with appearances in Goodyear Television Playhouse. During the 1960s, he appeared in I Dream of Jeannie, The Nurses, The Defenders, Car 54, Where Are You? (in nine episodes), Hogan's Heroes (in three episodes) and The Patty Duke Show, among others. He played in Bonanza (in three episodes), Ironside (in three episodes), Barney Miller (in three episodes), The Rockford Files (in three episodes), The Marcus-Nelson Murders, Kojak (in six episodes), and M*A*S*H and Alice during the 1970s. In the 1980s, he appeared in Remington Steele, Hunter (in five episodes), Night Court, Matlock, Hill Street Blues, Lou Grant and Punky Brewster. His 1990s television credits include The Golden Girls, L.A. Law, In the Heat of the Night, Murphy Brown, Murder, She Wrote (in two episodes) and Chicago Hope. In 1999 and 2000, he appeared in eight episodes of the soap opera Days of Our Lives. During the 2000s, he appeared in The Sopranos, The Agency, Scrubs and The West Wing.

Kirby appeared nine times in the long-running series Columbo, most notably in the role of Sergeant George Kramer in six episodes. In 1981–1982, he appeared as San Francisco police officer Schmidt in the crime drama Shannon. He played District Attorney Bruce Rogoff in thirteen episodes of L.A. Law from 1986 until 1991. He also had minor roles in films, including the classics Catch-22 (1970) and Stand by Me (1986). He appeared in the 1971 movie How to Frame a Figg with Don Knotts and the 1972 comedy Another Nice Mess with Rich Little. A notable later appearance was as Pop Ryan, father of Officer John Ryan (played by Matt Dillon) in the 2005 film Crash. Kirby was also active as an actor on New York's Broadway, appearing in Diamond Orchid (1965) and Death of a Salesman (1984).

== Personal life ==
Kirby had two sons, Bruno Kirby (1949–2006) and John Kirby (1950/1951 – 2026), who were also actors. Bruno appeared with his father in It's Garry Shandling's Show season 4 and "By Dawn's Early Light", an episode of the crime drama Columbo in which Bruno played Cadet Morgan (credited as B. Kirby, Jr.) and the elder Kirby played Sergeant Kramer. They also appeared together, as father and son, in "Suitable For Framing", a third-season episode of Room 222.

In the film Stand by Me, Kirby plays a storekeeper in a large country store where Wil Wheaton's character goes to buy supplies. The name of the store is Quidaciolu's—Kirby's birth name.

Kirby died in Los Angeles on January 24, 2021, at age 95.

== Filmography ==
=== Film ===
Year	Title	Role	Notes
1970	Catch-22	Doctor	
1971	How to Frame a Figg	Dale Groat	
1971	J. W. Coop	Diesel Tanker Driver	
1972	Another Nice Mess	Adolph	
1976	The Commitment	Simon Benson	
1979	Fyre	Father	
1979	The Muppet Movie	The Gate Guard	
1985	Sweet Dreams	Arthur Godfrey	
1986	Stand by Me	Mr. Quidacioluo	
1986	Armed and Dangerous	Police Captain	
1987	Happy New Year	Taxi Driver	
1987	Throw Momma from the Train	Detective DeBenedetto	
1988	The In Crowd	Morris	
1988	Lady in White	Cabbie	
1989	The Big Picture	Businessman	
1990	Bad Jim	Customer	
1992	Another Time, Another Place	Cotton Traynor	
1993	Mr. Wonderful	Dante	
1994	Rave Review	Milton Mandler	
1997	Cadillac	Augustine	
1998	Interlocked: Thrilled to Death	Walter	
2000	Vinnie and Angela's Beauty Salon and Funeral Parlor	Big Tony	
2004	Crash	Pop Ryan	
2008	2:22	Norman Penn	

=== Television ===
Year	Title	Role	Notes
1955	Goodyear Television Playhouse	Aide	Episode: "Visit to a Small Planet"
1956–1957	The Phil Silvers Show	Ice Cream Parlor Assistant / Gregory Chickering	2 episodes
1961–1963	Car 54, Where Are You?	Officer Kissel	9 episodes
1961–1965	The Defenders	Taxi Driver / Detective #2 / Italian Record	3 episodes
1965	The Doctors and the Nurses	Jack	Episode: "Sixteen Hours to Chicago"
1965	The Patty Duke Show	Mr. Haley / Theatre Manager	2 episodes
1968	I Dream of Jeannie	Passenger	Episode: "Jeannie and the Top Secret Secret"
1968	The Mothers-in-Law	Bill Trumbull	3 episodes
1968–1971	Bonanza	Mr. Loomis / Simms / Chad	3 episodes
1969	Judd, for the Defense	Arthur Kelly	Episode: "The Poisoned Tree"
1969	Night Gallery	Artist	Episode: "Pilot"
1969	Adam-12	Mike Fendel	Episode: "Log 123: Courtroom"
1969	Mission: Impossible	TV Newsman	Episode: "The Amnesiac"
1969, 1971	The Courtship of Eddie's Father	Officer Gifford / Harry	2 episodes
1969–1970	Hogan's Heroes	Otto Baum / Gestapo Man / Franz	3 episodes
1970	The Other Man	Dr. Brookner	Television film
1970–1971	Ironside	Nick Kirby / Ben / Buyer	3 episodes
1970–1971	Room 222	Lester Considine / Frank Muzak / Arnold Stopps	3 episodes
1971	The Mary Tyler Moore Show	Bert	Episode: "Hi!"
1971	Longstreet	Truck Driver	Episode: "The Way of the Intercepting Fist"
1971	Thief	Beffy	Television film
1971	Monty Nash	Mr. Miller	Episode: "Where Have All the Children Gone?"
1971	The Doris Day Show	Vito Carlotti	Episode: "Happiness Is Not Being Fired"
1971, 1974	Marcus Welby, M.D.	Fred Bowers / Lou Rienzi	2 episodes
1972	Me and the Chimp	Cop # 1	Episode: "My Pet, the Thief"
1972	Banacek	Collier	Episode: "Project Phoenix"
1972	The Mod Squad	Col. Broidy	Episode: "Taps, Play It Louder"
1972, 1973	McCloud	Desk Clerk / PR Man	2 episodes
1972–1973	Medical Center	Henderson / Policeman / Patrolman Hildon	3 episodes
1973	The Marcus-Nelson Murders	Sgt. Dan McCartney	Television film
1973	The New Perry Mason	Hank Caroll	Episode: "The Case of the Wistful Widower"
1973	The Bob Newhart Show	Dr. Klein	Episode: "Fit, Fat and Forty One"
1973–1976	Kojak	Sgt. Al Vine	6 episodes
1973–1995	Columbo	Various	9 episodes
1974	Chopper One	Pete	Episode: "The Boy Who Cried Wolf"
1974	Man on the Outside	Scully	Television film
1974–1978	The Rockford Files	Sid Loft / Aaron Friedler / Carl Lemay	3 episodes
1975	Chico and the Man	Officer Kirby	Episode: "Out of Sight"
1975	The Streets of San Francisco	Carl Severn	Episode: "Ten Dollar Murder"
1975	M*A*S*H	Sergeant Kimble	Episode: "Hey, Doc"
1975	Harry O	FAA Chief	Episode: "Mayday"
1975	America, You're On	Charles Ralston	Television film
1975	Conspiracy of Terror	Sgt. Brisbane	Television film
1976	Delvecchio	Moretti	2 episodes
1976–1977	Holmes & Yoyo	Capt. Harry Sedford	13 episodes
1977	McNamara's Band	Gaffney	Television film
1978	Operation Petticoat	Admiral Bob Lawson	Episode: "The Best of Enemies"
1978	The Eddie Capra Mysteries	Lt. Floyd	2 episodes
1978–1979	Barney Miller	Frank Rossman / Franklin Claymore / Lt. Rossmore	3 episodes
1979	Alice	Mr. Lloyd	Episode: "Tommy's First Love"
1979	Turnabout	Al Brennan	5 episodes
1979	ABC Afterschool Special	Tom Denis	Episode: "Which Mother Is Mine?"
1979	Marie	Edgar Merton	Unsold pilot
1980	Vegas	Joe Culley	2 episodes
1981	The Other Victim	Mead	Television film
1981	The Greatest American Hero	Shorty Robinson	Episode: "The Two-Hundred-Mile-an-Hour Fast Ball"
1981–1982	Shannon	Det. George Schmidt	9 episodes
1981, 1982	Lou Grant	Captain Shackley / Gus Murray	2 episodes
1982	Code Red	Bert Simmons	Episode: "Trial by Fire"
1982	Tucker's Witch	Harmony	Episode: "The Corpse Who Knew Too Much"
1982	Remington Steele	Michael Dominick	Episode: "Steele Trap"
1983	Hill Street Blues	Jack Donleavy	Episode: "Moon Over Uranus"
1983	Lovers and Other Strangers	Priest	Television film
1983	Branagan and Mapes	Barney Sutter	Television film
1984	Three's a Crowd	Sgt. Collins	Episode: "A Matter of Money"
1985	Stir Crazy	Lou Flanders	Episode: "The Magnificent Repossesion"
1985, 1987	Night Court	Sgt. Braverman / Herb Gilpin	2 episodes
1986–1991	L.A. Law	D.A. Bruce Rogoff	13 episodes
1987	Down and Out in Beverly Hills	Maury Rodman	2 episodes
1987–1988	Hunter	Chief Edward Stanmore	5 episodes
1987, 1988	Punky Brewster	Mr. Frank	2 episodes
1988	Frank Nitti: The Enforcer	Anton Cermak	Television film
1989	Anything but Love	Leo Miller	4 episodes
1989	Have Faith	Sgt. Rizzo	Episode: "The Confession"
1989	Matlock	Abe Forester	Episode: "The Ex"
1989	It's Garry Shandling's Show	Eddie King	Episode: "Dinner at Eddie King's House"
1990	Ann Jillian	Marsh Pearson	Episode: "It's a Mall World After All"
1990	In the Heat of the Night	Dep. Chief Harlan Cassidy	2 episodes
1990	The Fanelli Boys	Uncle Dom	Episode: "The Two Doms"
1990	Hull High	Wansley	Episode #1.6
1990, 1996	Murder, She Wrote	Jeremy Woods / Andy Butler	2 episodes
1991	Perry Mason: The Case of the Fatal Fashion	Det. Lt. Brennan	Television film
1991	The Golden Girls	Bill	Episode: "From Here to the Pharmacy"
1991–1992	Reasonable Doubts	Don Morris	2 episodes
1993	The Odd Couple: Together Again	Zelnick	Television film
1994	Blue Skies	Sid	Episode: "Cat's in the Bag"
1994	Madman of the People	Benny DeLorenzo	Episode: "What a Big Mouth You Have, Grammy"
1995	Bless This House	Bill	Episode: "A Woman's Work Is Never Done"
1995	The Single Guy	Uncle Mike	Episode: "Gift"
1995	One West Waikiki	Earl Reynolds	Episode: "Past Due"
1995–2000	Days of Our Lives	Marco / Mr. Panetta / Doctor	12 episodes
1996	Murphy Brown	Judge	Episode: "Old Flames"
1996	Caroline in the City	Manny	Episode: "Caroline and the Comic"
1996	A Different Kind of Christmas	Santa Claus	Television film; uncredited
1997	The Sentinel	Herman Franklin	Episode: "His Brother's Keeper"
1997, 1998	Tracey Takes On...	Dean	2 episodes
1998	Players	Frank Macek	Episode: "Con-strained"
1998	Chicago Hope	Garner Hoversten	Episode: "One Hundred and One Damnations"
2000	Blood Money	Uncle Joe	Television film
2001	The West Wing	Barney Lang	Episode: "The Women of Qumar"
2004	The Sopranos	Dr. Russ Fegoli	Episode: "Marco Polo"
2007	Numbers	Numb3rs	Episode: "Burn Rate"
2007	Scrubs	Mr. Bilbray	Episode: "My Cold Shower"
