= Bruno Kirby =

American actor (1949–2006)

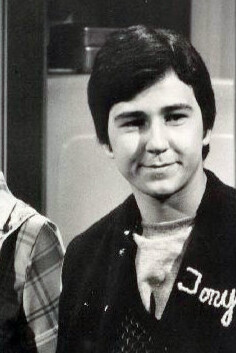
- Kirby in The Super in 1972
- Born: Bruno Giovanni Quidaciolu Jr. April 28, 1949; New York City, U.S.
- Died: August 14, 2006 (aged 57); Los Angeles, California, U.S.
- Other names: Bruce Kirby Jr. B. Kirby Jr.
- Occupation: Actor
- Years active: 1969–2006
- Spouse: Lynn Sellers (m. 2003)
- Father: Bruce Kirby
- Relatives: John Kirby (brother)

Bruno Kirby (born Bruno Giovanni Quidaciolu Jr.; April 28, 1949 – August 14, 2006) was an American actor. He was best known for his roles in: City Slickers, When Harry Met Sally..., Good Morning, Vietnam, The Godfather Part II, The Freshman, Sleepers, Donnie Brasco and This Is Spinal Tap. He voiced Reginald Stout in Stuart Little.

== Career ==
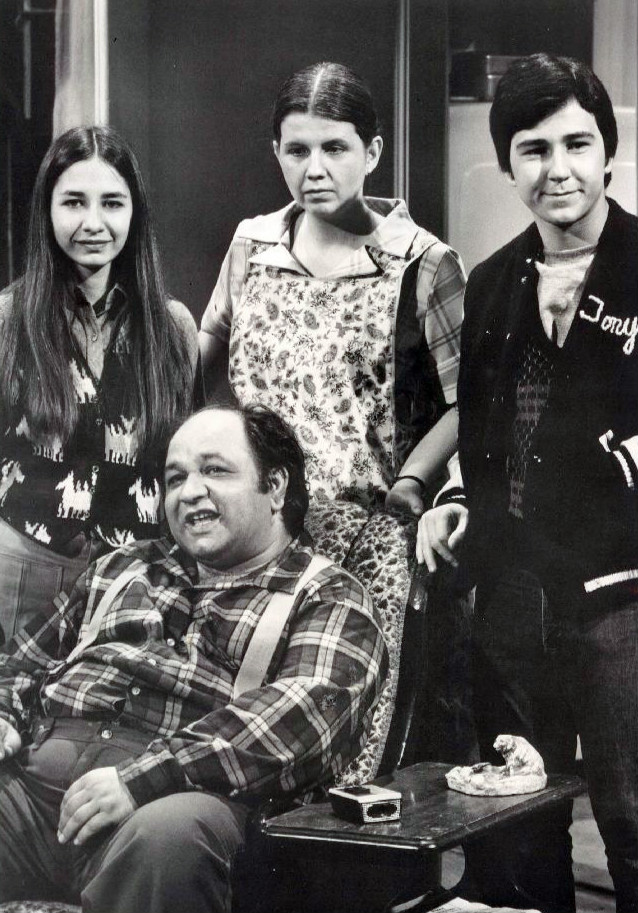
Richard S. Castellano, Margaret Castellano, Ardell Sheridan and Bruno Kirby in The Super, 1972.

Kirby was a character actor whose career spanned 35 years. In 1971, he made his screen debut in the drama The Young Graduates. His role three years later as the young Peter Clemenza in the epic crime film The Godfather Part II raised his profile in Hollywood. In the summer of 1972, in one of his early television appearances, Kirby portrayed Anthony Girelli, the son of Richard Castellano's character Joe Girelli, in The Super. Castellano had previously played the older Peter Clemenza in The Godfather. In 1973, he appeared in The Harrad Experiment.

His other television appearances included Room 222 and the pilot episode of M*A*S*H, portraying the character Boone (he had no lines). He also appeared in the 1974 Columbo episode "By Dawn's Early Light", alongside his father Bruce Kirby, and in the season 2 episode "Seance" of Emergency!, where he was credited as "B. Kirby Jr."

Described by Leonard Maltin as the "quintessential New Yorker or cranky straight man", Kirby appeared in a series of comedies, typically playing fast-talking, belligerent yet likable characters. His best-known roles include a colleague of Albert Brooks' film editor in Modern Romance; a talkative limo driver in This Is Spinal Tap; the jealous, comedically impaired Lieutenant Hauk in Good Morning, Vietnam; and a shifty assistant to Marlon Brando—a parody of Brando's Godfather role—in The Freshman.

Kirby balanced comedies with dramatic roles like Donnie Brasco as a double-dealing mobster. Kirby appeared with Billy Crystal in When Harry Met Sally... (1989) and City Slickers (1991). Both featured Kirby's character as the opinionated best friend to Crystal's character. Due to his strong horse allergies, Kirby refused to sign on for City Slickers II: The Legend of Curly's Gold unless script changes were made, and was subsequently replaced by Jon Lovitz.

In 1996, Bruno guest-starred on an episode of Mad About You. In 1991, Kirby made his Broadway debut when he replaced Kevin Spacey in Neil Simon's Lost in Yonkers. In the last decade of his life, he had success in Stuart Little and was increasingly working in television. He starred as Barry Scheck in the 2000 CBS drama American Tragedy, played a paroled convict in a season three episode of Homicide: Life on the Street, and also directed an episode of that show.

He appeared on the HBO TV series Entourage in season 3, episode 4, "Guys and Doll", as movie mogul Phil Rubinstein.

In 2006, he was invited to be a member of the Actors Studio, less than six months before his death.

== Personal life ==
He shared the same birthday, April 28, with his father, actor Bruce Kirby, who was born in 1925. Kirby attended Power Memorial Academy in Manhattan. He had one brother, John Kirby, who was an acting coach. Kirby went to high school with NBA player Kareem Abdul Jabbar.

Kirby grew up in Hell's Kitchen, Manhattan.

Like his character in This Is Spinal Tap, Kirby was a fan of Frank Sinatra. He was strongly allergic to horses and needed daily allergy shots on the set of City Slickers. This was part of the reason he declined to return for City Slickers II: The Legend of Curly's Gold.

In the 1970s, Kirby was in a relationship with actress Annette O'Toole. He married actress Lynn Sellers on September 29, 2003. They remained married until his death, in 2006.

=== Death ===
Kirby died on August 14, 2006, at age 57, from complications related to leukemia, having been diagnosed three weeks prior.

== Filmography ==
=== Film ===
Year	Title	Role	Notes
1971	The Young Graduates	Les	Credited as B. Kirby Jr.
1973	The Harrad Experiment	Harry Schacht	
1973	Superdad	Stanley Schlimmer	
1973	Cinderella Liberty	Alcott	
1974	The Godfather Part II	Young Peter Clemenza	Credited as B. Kirby Jr.
1976	Baby Blue Marine	Pop Mosley	
1977	Between the Lines	David Entwhistle	
1978	Almost Summer	Bobby DeVito	
1980	Where the Buffalo Roam	Marty Lewis	
1980	Borderline	Jimmy Fante	
1981	Modern Romance	Jay	
1982	Kiss My Grits	Flash	
1984	This Is Spinal Tap	Tommy Pischedda	
1984	Birdy	Phil Renaldi	
1985	Flesh and Blood	Orbec	
1987	Tin Men	Mouse	
1987	Good Morning, Vietnam	Lt. Steven Hauk	
1989	Bert Rigby, You're a Fool	Kyle DeForest	
1989	When Harry Met Sally...	Jess Fisher	
1989	We're No Angels	Deputy	
1990	The Freshman	Victor Ray	
1991	City Slickers	Ed Furillo	
1992	Hoffa	Nightclub Comic	Uncredited
1993	Golden Gate	Agent Ron Pirelli	
1995	The Basketball Diaries	Swifty	
1996	Sleepers	Mr. Carcaterra	
1997	Donnie Brasco	Nicky Santora	
1999	A Slipping-Down Life	Kiddie Acres Manager	
1999	Spy Games	Max Fisher	Alternate title: History Is Made at Night
1999	Stuart Little	Reginald "Reggie" Stout (voice)	
2001	One Eyed King	Mickey	
2006	Played	Detective Allen	Final film appearance

=== Television ===
Year	Title	Role	Notes
1969–1973	Room 222	Herbie Considine	5 episodes Credited as B. Kirby Jr.
1972	The Super	Anthony Girelli	10 episodes
1972	M*A*S*H	Pvt. Lorenzo Boone	Episode: "Pilot"
1973	Emergency!	Ken	Episode: "Seance"
1973	A Summer Without Boys	Quincy	ABC Movie of the Week
1974	Columbo	Cadet Morgan	Episode: "By Dawn's Early Light"
1975	Kojak	Keith Wicks	Episode: "Acts of Desperate Men"
1976	Delvecchio		Episode: "Board of Rights"; uncredited
1979	Detective School	Marvin	Episode: "The Bank Job"
1981	ABC Afterschool Special	Official	Episode: "Run, Don't Walk"
1982	Million Dollar Infield	Lou Buonomato	Television movie
1982	Fame	Marty Shwartz	Episode: "Homecoming"
1983	Hill Street Blues	Louis	Episode: "The Russians Are Coming"
1984	Buchanan High	Mr. Prescott	2 episodes
1989–1990	It's Garry Shandling's Show	Brad Brillnick	8 episodes
1991	Tales from the Crypt	Billy Paloma	Episode: "The Trap"
1992	Mastergate	Abel Lamb	Television movie
1993	Fallen Angels	Tony Reseck	Episode: "I'll Be Waiting"
1993	Frasier	Marco (voice)	Episode: "Call Me Irresponsible"
1993–1998	The Larry Sanders Show	Himself	5 episodes
1994	Late Show with David Letterman	Cop on the Edge	1 episode
1995	Homicide: Life on the Street	Victor Helms	Episode: "The Gas Man"
1996	Mad About You	Virgil	Episode: "The Gym"
1999	Happily Ever After: Fairy Tales for Every Child	The Great One (voice)	Episode: "Ali Baba and the Forty Thieves"
2000	American Tragedy	Barry Scheck	Television movie
2001	Between the Lions	Sad Dad	Episode: "The Sad Dad"
2001	Biography	Narrator	Episode: "Bobby Darin: I Want to Be a Legend"
2004	Helter Skelter	Vincent Bugliosi	Television movie
2004	The Jury	Carmen Pintozzi	Episode: "Too Jung to Die"
2006	Entourage	Phil Rubenstein	Episode: "Guys and Doll"; Final television appearance

== Awards and nominations ==
Year	Result	Award	Category	Film or series
1992	Nominated	American Comedy Awards	Funniest Supporting Actor	City Slickers
