= Richard S. Castellano =

American actor (1933-1988)

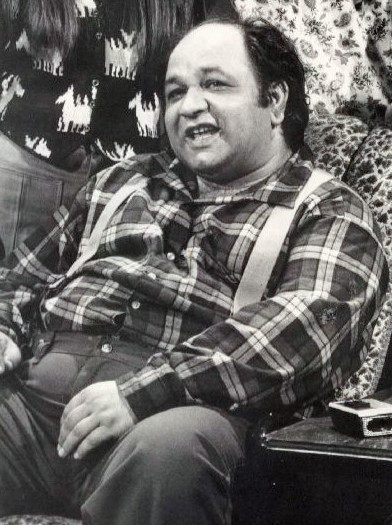
- Castellano in The Super in 1972
- Born: Richard Salvatore Castellano; September 4, 1933; New York City, New York, U.S.
- Died: December 10, 1988 (aged 55); North Bergen, New Jersey, U.S.
- Occupation: Actor
- Years active: 1962–1982
- Notable work: The Godfather

Richard Salvatore Castellano (September 4, 1933 – December 10, 1988) was an American actor who is best remembered for his Academy Award nominated role in Lovers and Other Strangers and his subsequent role as Peter Clemenza in The Godfather.

== Early life ==
Castellano was born in the Queens borough of New York City on September 4, 1933. His parents, Mariantonia Angello and Filippo Castellano, were Italian immigrants from Castrofilippo, Sicily. His middle name, Salvatore, was in honor of his oldest brother who had died two years before he was born.

After his death, Castellano's widow, Ardell Sheridan, who had played his character Peter Clemenza's wife in The Godfather, claimed he was the nephew of Gambino crime family boss Paul Castellano; however, Richard Castellano's sister dismissed the claim as false: "we're not related to Paul", she stated.

== Career ==
Castellano, after beginning as an extra in TV shows such as Naked City, started working in various small roles. He first gained fame for his role in Lovers and Other Strangers (1970), for which he was nominated for an Academy Award. He won a Tony in the stage version of the work in 1968. He appeared on Broadway in The Investigation, the Peter Weiss play depicting the Frankfurt Auschwitz Trials, in Frank D. Gilroy's That Summer, That Fall, alongside Tyne Daly and Irene Papas, and in Art Buchwald's comedy Sheep on the Runway.

He achieved stardom in 1972, with The Godfather directed by Francis Ford Coppola, playing the part of gangster Peter Clemenza. The Godfather became the highest-grossing film up to that time and Castellano, along with several other cast members, became widely known from the popular film. He spoke, and, according to his wife, partially ad libbed, one of the film's most famous lines, "Leave the gun; take the cannoli." In The Godfather Part II (1974), only the young Clemenza appears, portrayed by Bruno Kirby. Castellano and Coppola had differences, resulting in Castellano no longer playing the role in the sequel.

Castellano worked on television, playing the lead role in The Super sitcom that ran for 10 episodes in 1972, whose protagonist, Joe Girelli, is the superintendent of a New York City apartment building. His real-life daughter, Margaret Castellano, portrayed the super's daughter, Joanne. Castellano also starred as the lead, Joe Vitale, in the sitcom Joe and Sons (1975–1976).

== Death ==
Castellano died from a heart attack at his home in North Bergen, New Jersey, in 1988 at age 55. His wife said that they both had been working on a book to be titled History of the Method, which would ostensibly chronicle the birth of method acting.

== Filmography ==
Year	Title	Role	Notes
1963	Love with the Proper Stranger	Extra	Uncredited
1965	Three Rooms in Manhattan	Angry American	Uncredited
1966	A Fine Madness	Arnold	
1968	A Lovely Way to Die	The Bartender	Uncredited
1970	Lovers and Other Strangers	Frank Vecchio	Oscar Nominated
1972	The Godfather	Peter Clemenza	
1973	Honor Thy Father	Frank Labruzzo	
1973	Incident on a Dark Street	Frank Romeo	
1980	Night of the Juggler	Lieutenant Tonelli	
1981	The Gangster Chronicles	Giuseppe "Joe the Boss" Masseria	
1982	Dear Mr. Wonderful	FBI Agent	(final film role)
