= When Harry Met Sally... =

1989 film by Rob Reiner

- Theatrical release poster
- Directed by: Rob Reiner
- Written by: Nora Ephron
- Produced by: Rob Reiner; Andrew Scheinman
- Starring: Billy Crystal; Meg Ryan; Carrie Fisher; Bruno Kirby
- Cinematography: Barry Sonnenfeld
- Edited by: Robert Leighton
- Music by: Marc Shaiman (Note: Music arrangements and adaptations); Harry Connick Jr. (Note: Special performances and arrangements)
- Production companies: Castle Rock Entertainment; Nelson Entertainment
- Distributed by: Columbia Pictures
- Release date: July 21, 1989
- Running time: 95 minutes
- Country: United States
- Language: English
- Budget: $16 million
- Box office: $193 million

When Harry Met Sally... is a 1989 American romantic comedy film directed by Rob Reiner and written by Nora Ephron. Starring Billy Crystal, Meg Ryan, Carrie Fisher, and Bruno Kirby, it follows the title characters from the time they meet in Chicago and share a drive to New York City through twelve years of chance encounters in New York, and addresses the question "Can men and women ever just be friends?"

Ideas for the film began when Reiner and Penny Marshall divorced. An interview Ephron conducted with Reiner provided the basis for Harry; Sally was based on Ephron and some of her friends. Crystal joined and contributed to the screenplay. Ephron supplied the structure of the film with much of the dialogue based on the real-life friendship between Reiner and Crystal. The soundtrack consists of standards from Harry Connick Jr., with a big band and orchestra arranged by Marc Shaiman. For his work on the soundtrack, Connick won his first Grammy Award for Best Jazz Male Vocal Performance.

Columbia Pictures released When Harry Met Sally in selected cities, letting word of mouth generate interest, before gradually expanding distribution. The film grossed $92.8 million in North America, and was released to critical acclaim. Ephron received the BAFTA Award for Best Original Screenplay, as well as nominations for the Academy Award, WGA Award and Golden Globe. The film is ranked 23rd on AFI's 100 Years... 100 Laughs list of the top comedy films in American cinema and number 60 on Bravo's "100 Funniest Movies". In early 2004, the film was adapted for the stage in a production starring Luke Perry and Alyson Hannigan. In 2022, the film was selected for preservation in the United States National Film Registry by the Library of Congress as being "culturally, historically, or aesthetically significant".

== Plot ==
In 1977, cynical Harry Burns and optimistic Sally Albright graduate from the University of Chicago. Sally gives Harry a ride to New York City because he is dating her friend, Amanda. During the journey, they debate their differing views on life and relationships. Sally rejects Harry's claim that men and women cannot be friends because the man will always want to have sex with the woman. At a diner, Harry tells Sally she is very attractive, prompting her to accuse him of making a pass. They part ways in New York at the Washington Square Arch, never intending to see each other again.

Five years later, in 1982, Harry and Sally encounter each other at an airport. Harry can not immediately place her, while Sally remembers him unfavorably. Sally has recently begun dating Harry's acquaintance Joe, while Harry reveals that he is engaged to Helen, which Sally considers uncharacteristically optimistic of him. Harry suggests that he and Sally become friends, but cannot disprove his earlier argument about the impossibility of male-female friendships, and Sally walks away.

By 1987, Helen has left Harry for another man, leaving him depressed, while Sally and Joe have broken up. Harry and Sally later run into each other and discuss their failed relationships. Sally explains that she and Joe never married because he believed relationships deteriorated after marriage. She insists that she is unaffected by their separation. Harry and Sally admit they disliked each other when they first met but agree to become friends, gradually developing a close, honest platonic relationship. Both eventually begin dating other people again, without success.

At a New Year's Eve party, Harry and Sally realize they are becoming attracted to each other but do not acknowledge it. They arrange a double date with their respective best friends, Marie and Jess, only for Marie and Jess to fall for each other immediately and soon move in together. While shopping for a gift for them, Harry and Sally run into Helen and her partner, which disturbs Harry. Later, seeing Marie and Jess argue over decorations prompts Harry to break down and bitterly warn them that even happy relationships can end badly. Sally admonishes him, and they briefly argue before reconciling. Some time later, both begin dating other people, though their feelings for each other remain.

One night, Sally tearfully calls Harry after learning that Joe is getting married and wonders why he never wanted to marry her. Harry goes to comfort her, and they end up having sex. Sally is initially pleased about the encounter, but Harry, who habitually leaves women soon after sex, becomes uncomfortable and leaves early the next morning, embarrassing her. They later describe the encounter as a mistake, but Sally is visibly hurt by Harry's reaction, and their friendship becomes strained. Three weeks later, at Marie and Jess's wedding reception, they argue when Sally insists the night meant something and resents Harry's attempts to dismiss it. By Christmas 1988, despite Harry's efforts to apologize, Sally tells him she can no longer continue their relationship or be his "consolation prize".

On New Year's Eve, Sally attends a party but remains unhappy. Harry wanders the streets alone, returns to the Washington Square Arch, and reflects on his relationship with Sally. Harry runs to the party and catches her as she is about to leave. He declares his love, but Sally initially refuses to forgive him, believing he is just lonely. Harry lists the things he loves about her and says that, now that he understands his feelings, he wants their life together to begin as soon as possible. Three months later, Harry and Sally are married.

== Cast ==
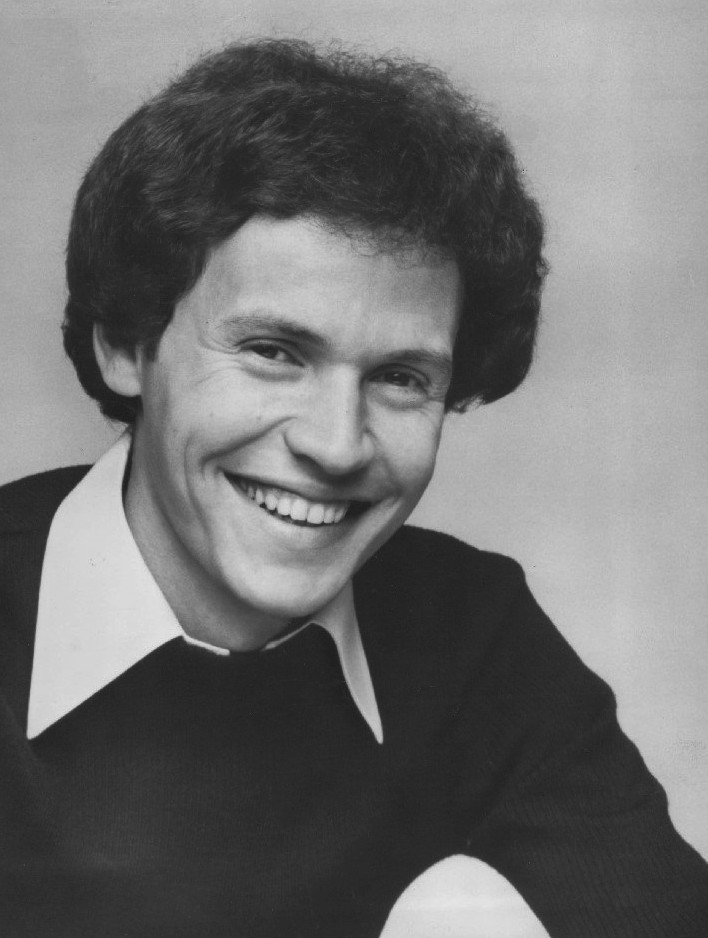
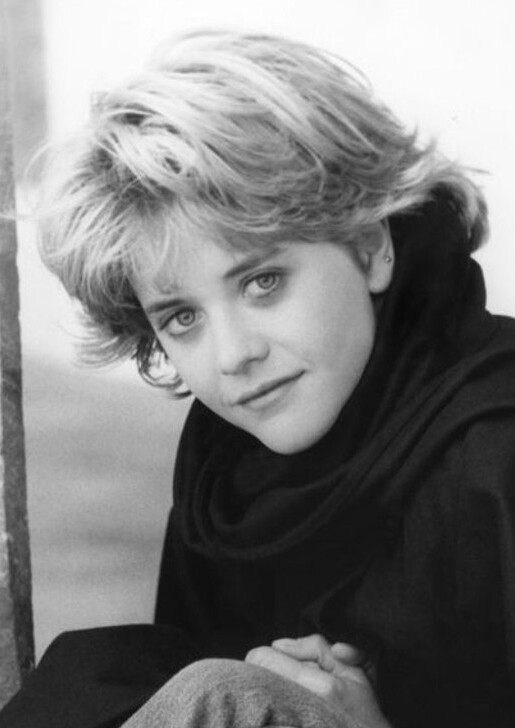
Billy Crystal (pictured in 1977) and Meg Ryan (1983)
- Billy Crystal as Harry Burns, a cynical political advisor
- Meg Ryan as Sally Albright, an optimistic journalist
- Carrie Fisher as Marie, Sally's best friend
- Bruno Kirby as Jess, Harry's best friend
- Steven Ford as Joe, Harry's neighbor and Sally's ex-boyfriend
- Lisa Jane Persky as Alice, Sally and Marie's friend
- Michelle Nicastro as Amanda Reese, Sally's friend and Harry's college girlfriend
- Kevin Rooney as Ira Stone, Helen's new lover
- Harley Kozak as Helen Hillson, Harry's ex-wife
- Estelle Reiner as female customer

== Production ==
In 1984, director Rob Reiner, producer Andrew Scheinman, and writer Nora Ephron met over lunch at the Russian Tea Room in New York City to develop a project. Reiner pitched an idea for a film that Ephron rejected. The second meeting transformed into a long discussion about Reiner and Scheinman's lives as single men. Reiner remembered, "I was in the middle of my single life. I'd been divorced for a while. I'd been out a number of times, all these disastrous, confusing relationships one after another." The next time they all met, Reiner said that he had always wanted to do a film about two people who become friends and do not have sex because they know it will ruin their relationship but have sex anyway. Ephron liked the idea, and Reiner acquired a deal at a studio.

For materials, Ephron interviewed Reiner and Scheinman about their lives, creating the basis for Harry. Reiner was constantly depressed and pessimistic yet funny. Ephron also got bits of dialogue from these interviews. Sally was based on Ephron and some of her friends. She worked on several drafts over the years while Reiner made Stand by Me (1986) and The Princess Bride (1987). Billy Crystal "experienced vicariously" Reiner's (his best friend at the time) return to single life after divorcing comedian/filmmaker Penny Marshall and in the process was unconsciously doing research for the role of Harry. Tom Hanks, Richard Dreyfuss, Michael Keaton and Albert Brooks all discussed the role with Reiner, with Brooks feeling the movie was too reminiscent of Woody Allen's work.

During the screenwriting process when Ephron did not feel like writing, she would interview people who worked for the production company. Some of the interviews appeared in the film as the interludes between certain scenes featuring couples talking about how they met, although the material was rewritten and reshot with actors. Ephron supplied the structure of the film with much of the dialogue based on the real-life friendship between Reiner and Crystal. For example, the scene depicting Sally and Harry in split-screen conversing with each other by telephone and simultaneously watching television and channel surfing was something that Crystal and Reiner did every night.

Originally, Ephron wanted to call the film How They Met and went through several different titles. Reiner even started a contest with the crew during principal photography: whoever came up with the title won a case of champagne. In order to get into the lonely mindset of Harry when he was divorced and single, Crystal stayed by himself in a separate room from the cast and crew while they were shooting in Manhattan. The script initially ended with Harry and Sally remaining friends and not pursuing a romantic relationship because she felt that was "the true ending", as did Reiner. Eventually, Ephron and Reiner realized that it would be a more appropriate ending for them to marry, though they admit that this was generally not a realistic outcome. Reiner related that the film originally had a sad ending before he met his second wife Michele Singer, which inspired him to change the ending.

When posed the film's central question, can men and women just be friends, Ryan replied, "Yes, men and women can just be friends. I have a lot of platonic (male) friends, and sex doesn't get in the way." Crystal said, "I'm a little more optimistic than Harry. But I think it is difficult. Men basically act like stray dogs in front of a supermarket. I do have platonic (women) friends, but not best, best, best friends." Reiner's mother Estelle and daughter Tracy both played roles in the film.

Gloria Gresham was the costume designer; Harry's cream-colored cable-knit sweater with jeans and sneakers, and Sally's boxy autumnal tweeds became iconic, much-duplicated looks.

=== Katz's Delicatessen scene ===
Film still from the famous restaurant scene

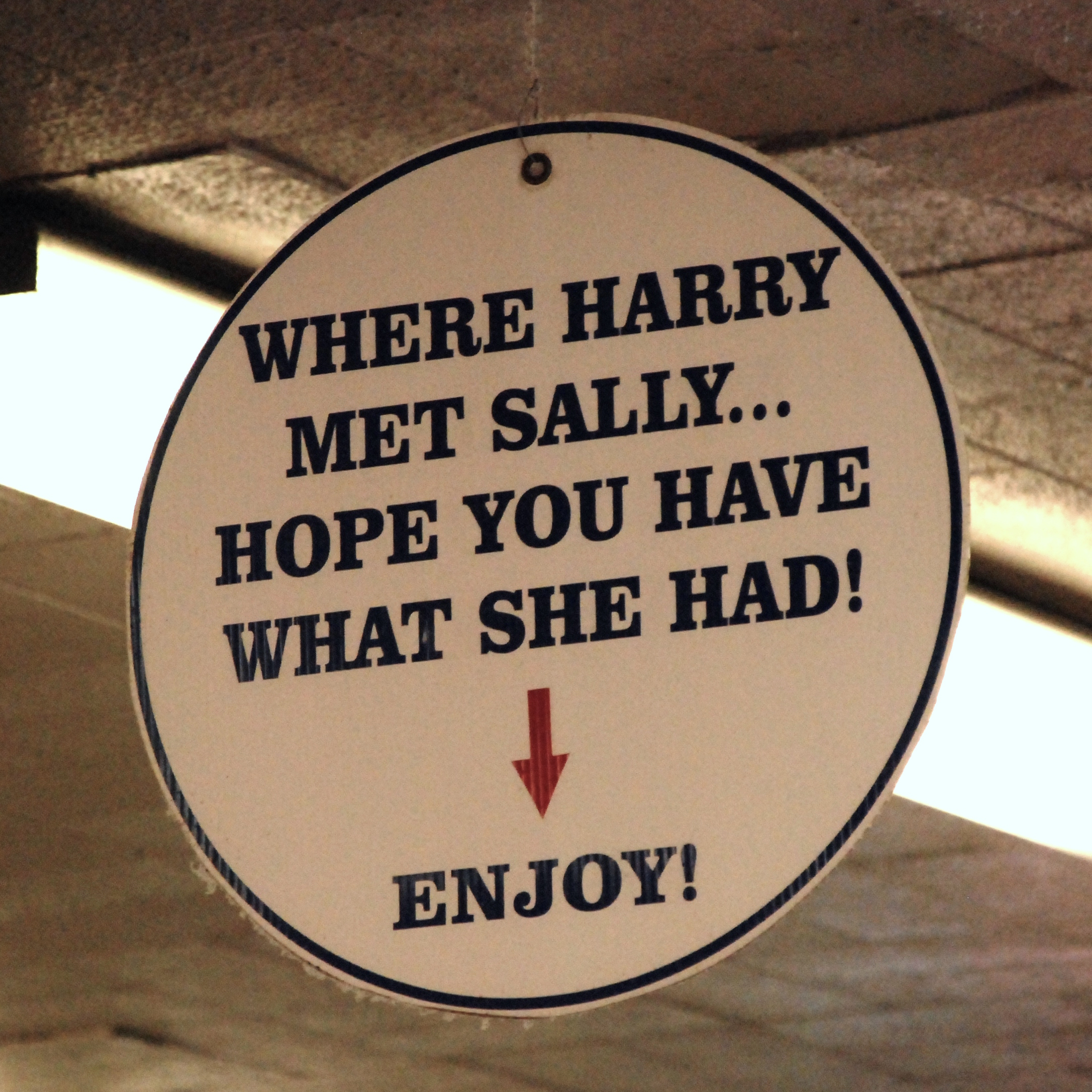
Katz's Deli hangs this sign above the table.

The film featured an iconic scene in which the two title characters are having lunch at Katz's Delicatessen, a well-known Jewish deli in Manhattan. The couple argue about a man's ability to recognize when a woman is faking an orgasm and Sally claims that men cannot tell the difference; to prove her point, she vividly fakes one as other diners turn to watch. The scene ends with Sally casually returning to her meal as a nearby patron (played by Reiner's mother) places her order, deadpan: "I'll have what she's having." When Estelle Reiner died at age 94 in 2008, The New York Times referred to her as the woman "who delivered one of the most memorably funny lines in movie history". This scene was shot "over and over again", and Ryan demonstrated her fake orgasms for hours. Katz's Deli still hangs a sign above the table that says, "Where Harry met Sally... hope you have what she had!"

The memorable scene was born when the film started to focus too much on Harry. Crystal remembers saying, "'We need something for Sally to talk about,' and Nora said, 'Well, faking orgasm is a great one,' and right away we said, 'Well, the subject is good,' and then Meg came on board and we talked with her about the nature of the idea and she said, 'Well, why don't I just fake one, just do one?'" Ryan suggested that the scene take place in a restaurant, and it was Crystal who came up with the scene's classic punchline – "I'll have what she's having." In 2005, the quote was listed 33rd on the AFI's 100 Years... 100 Movie Quotes list of memorable movie lines. Reiner recalls that at a test screening, all of the women in the audience were laughing while all of the men were silent.

In late 2013, Improv Everywhere, the New York City initiative behind the annual No Pants Day in the subways and various flash-mob stunts, convened and filmed a re-enactment in Katz's Delicatessen. While a look-alike couple performed the scene, 30 others joined in. Surprised staff and customers responded in appreciation. The film and follow-up interviews are public. In October of the same year, Katz's invited Baron Von Fancy to display his ten-foot-high mural quoting the famous line in its pop-up gallery next door, The Space.

In February 2025, Ryan and Crystal returned to the Deli in a Super Bowl commercial for Hellmann's mayonnaise that was evocative of the original scene and that first ran as part of the Super Bowl LIX broadcast. The "I'll have what she's having" line was delivered by Sydney Sweeney.

== Soundtrack ==
The When Harry Met Sally... soundtrack album features American singer and pianist Harry Connick Jr. Bobby Colomby, the drummer for Blood, Sweat & Tears, was a friend of Reiner's and recommended Harry Connick Jr., giving the director a tape of the musician's music. Reiner was struck by Connick's voice and how he sounded like a young Frank Sinatra. The movie's soundtrack album was released by Columbia Records in July 1989. The soundtrack consists of standards performed by Harry Connick Jr. with a big band and orchestra arranged by Marc Shaiman. Connick won his first Grammy for Best Jazz Male Vocal Performance.

Arrangements and orchestrations on "It Had to Be You", "Where or When", "I Could Write a Book", and "But Not for Me" are by Connick and Shaiman. Other songs were performed as piano/vocal solos, or with Connick's trio featuring Benjamin Jonah Wolfe on bass and Jeff "Tain" Watts on drums. Also appearing on the album are tenor saxophonist Frank Wess and guitarist Jay Berliner. The soundtrack went to #1 on the Billboard Traditional Jazz Chart and was within the top 50 on the Billboard 200. Connick also toured North America in support of this album. It went on to reach double-platinum status. The soundtrack features performances by Louis Armstrong and Ella Fitzgerald, Frank Sinatra, Ray Charles, Bing Crosby, and Harry Connick Jr.

== Reception ==
=== Box office ===
Columbia Pictures released When Harry Met Sally... using the "platform" technique, which involves opening a film in a few select cities then letting word of mouth generate interest before gradually expanding distribution over subsequent weeks. On its opening weekend, the movie grossed $1,094,453 in 41 theatres, the second-highest grossing opening weekend for a film on fewer than 50 screens, behind Star Wars (1977). Billy Crystal was worried that the film would flop at the box office because it was up against several summer blockbuster films, like Indiana Jones and the Last Crusade and Batman. The film opened in early July and went into wide release on July 21, 1989, grossing $8.8 million in 775 theaters in its first weekend of national release. The film later expanded to 1,174 theaters, and ultimately grossed $92.8 million in North America, well above its $16 million budget. Internationally the film is estimated to have taken in an additional $100 million, bringing the worldwide total to close to $193 million.

=== Critical response ===
On the review aggregator Rotten Tomatoes, When Harry Met Sally... holds an approval rating of 90% based on 143 reviews. The website's critics consensus reads, "Rob Reiner's touching, funny film set a new standard for romantic comedies, and he was ably abetted by the sharp interplay between Billy Crystal and Meg Ryan." On Metacritic, the film has a weighted average score of 76 out of 100, based on 17 critics, indicating "generally favorable reviews". Audiences polled by CinemaScore gave the film a rare "A+" grade.

The film led Roger Ebert to call Reiner "one of Hollywood's very best directors of comedy", and said the film was "most conventional, in terms of structure and the way it fulfills our expectations. But what makes it special, apart from the Ephron screenplay, is the chemistry between Crystal and Ryan."

In a review for The New York Times, Caryn James called When Harry Met Sally... an "often funny but amazingly hollow film" that "romanticized lives of intelligent, successful, neurotic New Yorkers"; James characterized it as "the sitcom version of a Woody Allen film, full of amusing lines and scenes, all infused with an uncomfortable sense of déjà vu".

Rita Kempley of The Washington Post praised Meg Ryan as the "summer's Melanie Griffith – a honey-haired blonde who finally finds a showcase for her sheer exuberance. Neither naif nor vamp, she's a woman from a pen of a woman, not some Cinderella of a Working Girl." Mike Clark of USA Today gave the film three out of four stars, writing, "Crystal is funny enough to keep Ryan from all-out stealing the film. She, though, is smashing in an eye-opening performance, another tribute to Reiner's flair with actors." David Ansen provided one of the rare negative reviews of the film for Newsweek. He criticized the casting of Crystal, "Not surprisingly he handles the comedy superbly, but he's too cool and self-protective an actor to work as a romantic leading man", and felt that as a film, "of wonderful parts, it doesn't quite add up".

=== Accolades ===
Award	Category	Recipient(s)	Result	Ref.
Academy Awards	Best Screenplay – Written Directly for the Screen	Nora Ephron	Nominated	
American Comedy Awards	Funniest Actor in a Motion Picture (Leading Role)	Billy Crystal	Won	
American Comedy Awards	Funniest Actress in a Motion Picture (Leading Role)	Meg Ryan	Won	
American Comedy Awards	Funniest Supporting Actress in a Motion Picture	Carrie Fisher	Nominated	
Artios Awards	Outstanding Achievement in Casting – Big Budget Feature (Comedy)	Jane Jenkins and Janet Hirshenson	Nominated	
ASCAP Film and Television Music Awards	Top Box Office Films	Marc Shaiman	Won	
British Academy Film Awards	Best Film	Rob Reiner	Nominated	
British Academy Film Awards	Best Original Screenplay	Nora Ephron	Won	
Chicago Film Critics Association Awards	Best Actress	Meg Ryan	Nominated	
David di Donatello Awards	Best Foreign Director	Rob Reiner	Nominated	
David di Donatello Awards	Best Foreign Actress	Meg Ryan	Nominated	
Directors Guild of America Awards	Outstanding Directorial Achievement in Motion Pictures	Rob Reiner	Nominated	
DVD Exclusive Awards	Best Audio Commentary	Rob Reiner	Nominated	
Golden Globe Awards	Best Motion Picture – Musical or Comedy	When Harry Met Sally...	Nominated	
Golden Globe Awards	Best Actor in a Motion Picture – Musical or Comedy	Billy Crystal	Nominated	
Golden Globe Awards	Best Actress in a Motion Picture – Musical or Comedy	Meg Ryan	Nominated	
Golden Globe Awards	Best Director – Motion Picture	Rob Reiner	Nominated	
Golden Globe Awards	Best Screenplay – Motion Picture	Nora Ephron	Nominated	
Writers Guild of America Awards	Best Screenplay – Written Directly for the Screen	Nora Ephron	Nominated	

The film is recognized by American Film Institute in these lists:

- 2000: AFI's 100 Years...100 Laughs – No. 23
- 2002: AFI's 100 Years...100 Passions – No. 25
- 2004: AFI's 100 Years...100 Songs:
  - "It Had to Be You" – No. 60
- 2005: AFI's 100 Years...100 Movie Quotes:
  - Customer: "I'll have what she's having." – No. 33
- 2008: AFI's 10 Top 10:
  - Romantic Comedy Film – No. 6

== Home media ==
When Harry Met Sally... was first released on VHS in late 1989, a few months after its theatrical release. It was later re-released on VHS in 1994 as part of a Billy Crystal collection, and in 1997 under the Contemporary Classics edition; the latter release included trailers that were not included in the original VHS release. It was released on DVD for the first time on January 9, 2001, and included an audio commentary by Reiner, a 35-minute "Making Of" documentary featuring interviews with Reiner, Ephron, Crystal, and Ryan, seven deleted scenes, and a music video for "It Had To Be You" by Harry Connick Jr. A Collector's Edition DVD was released on January 15, 2008, including a new audio commentary with Reiner, Ephron, and Crystal, eight deleted scenes, all new featurettes (It All Started Like This, Stories Of Love, When Rob Met Billy, Billy On Harry, I Love New York, What Harry Meeting Sally Meant, So Can Men And Women Really Be Friends?), and the original theatrical trailer. The film was released on Blu-ray on July 5, 2011, containing all of the special features found on the 2008 DVD release. In 2019, a 30th anniversary Blu-ray was released by Shout! Factory from a new 4K transfer of the original camera negative, containing special features from previous home media releases, as well as a new interview with director Rob Reiner and Billy Crystal. In 2012, critic Linda Holmes observed that significant portions of the soundtrack had been changed for the Amazon digital release.

== Legacy ==
Over the years, When Harry Met Sally... has become "the quintessential contemporary feel-good relationship movie that somehow still rings true". Before she died, Ephron still received letters from people obsessed with the film and still had "people who say to me all the time, 'I was having a Harry-and-Sally relationship with him or her'." The film is 23rd on AFI's 100 Years... 100 Laughs list of the top comedy films in American cinema and number 60 on Bravo's "100 Funniest Movies." Entertainment Weekly named it as one of the Top 10 romantic movies of all time. The magazine also ranked it 12th on their Funniest Movies of the Past 25 Years list. The periodical also ranked it 7th on their 25 Best Romantic Movies of the Past 25 Years list and #3 on their Top 25 Modern Romances list. The film has inspired countless romantic comedies, including A Lot Like Love, No Strings Attached, Hum Tum, and Definitely, Maybe. In addition, the film helped popularize many ideas about love that have become household concepts now, such as the "high-maintenance" girlfriend and the "transitional person". "You can find traces of When Harry Met Sally DNA in virtually every romantic comedy that's been made since," The A.V. Club noted.

In 2006, Writers Guild of America West ranked its screenplay 40th in WGA's list of 101 Greatest Screenplays. In June 2008, AFI revealed its "Ten top Ten"—the best ten films in ten "classic" American film genres—after polling over 1,500 people from the creative community. When Harry Met Sally was acknowledged as the sixth best film in the romantic comedy genre. It is also ranked #15 on Rotten Tomatoes' 25 Best Romantic Comedies. In early 2004, the film was adapted for the stage in a Theatre Royal Haymarket production starring Luke Perry and Alyson Hannigan. Molly Ringwald and Michael Landes later replaced Hannigan and Perry for the second cast. In 2022, the film was selected for preservation in the United States National Film Registry by the Library of Congress as being "culturally, historically, or aesthetically significant".

== See also ==
- More Than Friends (1978 film)
