= Lem Banker =

Lester "Lem" Banker (May 4, 1927 – November 2020) was an American professional sports bettor known for his success in the era before the legalization and digitization of sports gambling.

== Biography ==
Born in the Bronx, New York, Banker received an early introduction to gambling from his father, who operated as a bookie. After serving in the U.S. Army, Banker attended Long Island University and the University of Miami on basketball scholarships before relocating to Las Vegas in 1959 to begin his career in sports betting.

Banker's methodology for selecting bets relied on a network of individuals who would provide him with information from out-of-town newspapers. This system was used to identify variations in betting lines across different bookmakers before information was centralized by modern technology.

Banker became a public figure through appearances in national media, including People magazine and the television program Lifestyles of the Rich and Famous. He also authored a syndicated newspaper column on sports handicapping. In this columns, he correctly predicted the winner against the point spread in 20 of the first 23 Super Bowls, which included a streak of 13 consecutive correct picks from 1973 to 1985.

Banker was profiled in Larry Merchant's 1973 book The National Football Lottery and wrote his own book, Lem Banker’s Book of Sports Betting, which was published in 1986.

In his later years, Banker continued to bet on sports but reduced the size of his wagers. He stated this was a response to changes in the industry, as the widespread availability of information had led to more uniform betting lines. He died of natural causes at age 93.
