= Ta-Tanisha =

American character actress (born 1953)

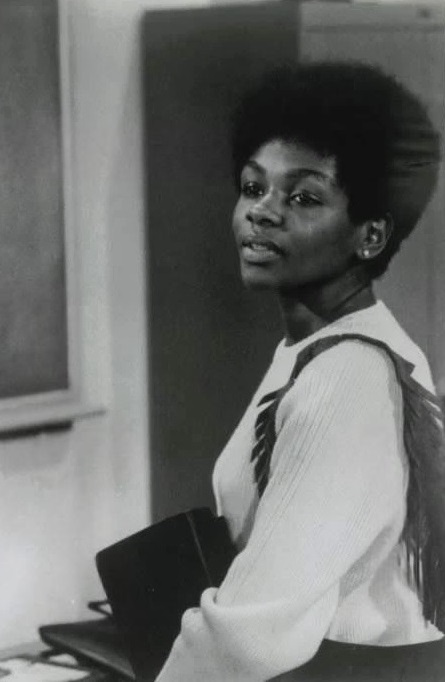
- Ta-Tanisha in Room 222 (1970)
- Born: Shirley Cummings; January 15, 1953 (age 73); The Bronx, New York, U.S.
- Occupation: Actress
- Years active: 1960-present
- Spouse: Lee Weaver (1971–2025)
- Children: 1

Ta-Tanisha (born Shirley Cummings on January 15, 1953 in The Bronx, New York) is an American character actress, best known for her role as Pam Simpson on the television series Room 222, which she played from 1970 to 1972.

Ta-Tanisha later appeared in the 1973 film The Sting and appeared on Sanford and Son as "The Sanford Arms" tenant Janet Lawrence. She also appeared on Good Times three times (in three separate roles) as well as on What's Happening!!. She was married to veteran actor Lee Weaver from 1971 until his death in 2025.

== Career ==
Ta-Tanisha arrived in Los Angeles from Detroit, Michigan, in the 1960s. In the early 1970s Ta-Tanisha began studying theatre at the Performing Arts Society Los Angeles (PASLA) where she performed in several plays including Blues for Mister Charlie and A Raisin in the Sun. Ta-Tanisha also appeared in The Black Girl in Search of God at the Mark Taper Forum.

After a while, Ta-Tanisha began to get roles in television shows and films such as Room 222, in a recurring role as Pam Simpson, Good Times, Sanford & Son and the Mod Squad. She co-starred as a deaf mute on the hit show Mission: Impossible (1966 TV series) and was nominated for the NAACP Image Award for this performance. Ta-Tanisha was also in the Academy Award-winning movie, The Sting.

This exposure to the production process inspired Ta-Tanisha to create a Media literacy program for inner-city youth, Ta-Tanisha named this program TechniVision and it was presented at a local art center and as an after school program in conjunction with Los Angeles City Schools and Girls, Inc.

Ta-Tanisha received an award from the City of Los Angeles for “helping to heal the city” after the uprising of the early '90s in the city.

Currently Ta-Tanisha is part of the Repertory Dance Theater of Los Angeles and is part of a team that is conducting an after school performance program. Ta-Tanisha has also written a play about Biddy Mason, an enslaved African American woman who never learned to read or write; Miz Biddy. The play is currently in development.

== Personal life ==
From July 10, 1971, until his death in September 2025, she was married to actor Lee Weaver. They resided in the Bronx and have one child, Leis La-Te, a daughter.

== Filmography ==
=== Film ===
Year	Title	Role	Notes
1970	Halls of Anger	Claudine	
1970	Like It Is	Randy	
1973	Frasier, the Sensuous Lion		Also known as Frasier, the Lovable Lion
1973	The Stone Killer	Salesgirl	
1973	The Sting	Louise Coleman	
1977	The Choirboys	Melissa	
1991	The Whereabouts of Jenny	Scranton's Secretary	
1995	Days of the Pentecost	Melena's mother	

=== Television film ===
Year	Title	Role	Notes
1971	Crosscurrent	Rainie Lewis	
1983	Baby Sister	Night Nurse	
1982	The First Time	Shari	
1985	Star Fairies	Nightsong	Voice role
1987	Convicted: A Mother's Story		
1989	The Women of Brewster Place	Tenant #1	
2017	Last Resort: Sleep Tight		

=== Television series ===
Year	Title	Role	Notes
1969	Mod Squad	Leora Little	Season 2, Episode 7: Confrontation!
1969	Room 222	Pam Arnold	Season 1, Episode 13: Seventeen Going on Twenty-Eight
1970	Room 222	Pam Arnold	Season 1, Episode 17: Operation Sandpile
1970	Room 222	Pam Simpson	Season 2, Episode 7: Only a Rose
1970	Room 222	Pam Arnold	Season 2, Episode 8: The Fuzz That Grooved
1970	Room 222	Pam Arnold	Season 2, Episode 15: Now, About That Cherry Tree
1970	The Bill Cosby Show	Georgianna Jones	Season 2, Episode 4: There Must Be a Party
1970	Mission: Impossible	Maryana "Gabby" Renfrow	Season 5, Episode 10: Hunted Nominated: NAACP Image Award
1971	Room 222	Pam Simpson	Season 2, Episode 20: Hip Hip Hooray
1971	Room 222	Pam Simpson	Season 3, Episode 1: K-W-W-H]
1971	Room 222	Pam Simpson	Season 3, Episode 6:Suitable for Framing
1971	The New Dick Van Dyke Show	Judy	Season 1, Episode 3: Mid-term Dinner
1972	Room 222	Pam Simpson	Season 3, Episode 18: We Hold These Truths
1972	Mannix	Gloria Logan	Season 5, Episode 21: Lifeline
1972	The Partridge Family	Mary Lou Trimper	Season 3, Episode 10: Ain't Love Grand
1972	Emergency!	Rosie	Season 2, Episode 16: Syndrome
1973	Adam-12	Lizzie	Season 5, Episode 23: Keeping Tabs
1974	Cannon	Miranda	Season 3, Episode 23: Triangle of Terror
1975	Lucas Tanner	Jean	Season 1, Episode 15: What's wrong with Bobby?
1975	Sanford and Son	Janet Lawrence	Season 5, Episode 4: The Sanford Arms
1976	Sanford and Son	Janet Lawrence	Season 5, Episode 14: Can You Chop This?
1976	Executive Suite	Melida	Season 1, Episode 10: The Sounds of Silence
1976	What's Happening!!	Patrice Williams	Season 1, Episode 10: Puppy Love
1974	Good Times	Marcy	Season 1, Episode 13: My Son, the Lover
1976	Good Times	Mary Ann	Season 3, Episode 21: J.J. in Trouble
1979	Good Times	Zodiac Girl	Season 6, Episode 18:J.J. and T.C.
1980	The Jeffersons	Nurse #3	Season 6, Episode 16: The Arrival: Part 2
1985	Cagney & Lacey	Unknown	Season 5, Episode 9: Old Ghosts
1986	Hill Street Blues	Pregnant Lady	Season 6, Episode 18: Iced Coffey
1987	Amen	Mrs. Gordon	Season 2, Episode 4: Dueling Ministers
