= Clue Club =

1976 American animated television series

- Also known as: Woofer & Wimper, Dog Detectives
- Genre: Mystery; Comedy
- Directed by: Charles A. Nichols
- Voices of: David Jolliffe; Bob Hastings; Patricia Stich; Tara Talboy; Jim MacGeorge; Paul Winchell
- Theme music composer: Hoyt Curtin
- Composer: Hoyt Curtin
- Country of origin: United States
- Original language: English
- No. of seasons: 1
- No. of episodes: 16

Production
- Executive producers: William Hanna; Joseph Barbera
- Producer: Alex Lovy
- Running time: 30 minutes
- Production company: Hanna-Barbera Productions

Original release
- Network: CBS
- Release: September 4 – December 11, 1976

Clue Club is an American animated television series produced by Hanna-Barbera Productions and broadcast on CBS from September 4 to December 11, 1976.

== Overview ==
The series follows a group of four teenage detectives, the Clue Club – Larry, Pepper, D.D. and Dottie – who solved mysteries with the help of two talking dogs, a bloodhound and basset hound named Woofer and Wimper, respectively. Clue Club mysteries usually involved investigating bizarre crimes such as animals, trains, airports, a movie director and statues vanishing into thin air.

Clue Club only had one season's worth of first-run episodes produced, which were shown on Saturday mornings on CBS.

In the fall of 1977, cut-down versions of the half-hour episodes of Clue Club appeared under the new title Woofer & Wimper, Dog Detectives to showcase the show's bloodhound and basset hound; which aired as a segment on the CBS Saturday morning package program The Skatebirds from September 10, 1977, to January 21, 1978. When The Skatebirds was cancelled in early 1978, Woofer & Wimper, Dog Detectives re-appeared as a segment alongside The Three Robonic Stooges on their half-hour show from January 28 to September 2, 1978, also on CBS.

The full-length versions of Clue Club returned to CBS on Sunday mornings from September 10, 1978, to January 21, 1979, concluding the show's original network run. After a mid-1980s re-airing on USA Cartoon Express, it has since resurfaced on Cartoon Network (as part of the Mysteries, Inc. block) in the 1990s and Boomerang in the 2000s.

== Characters ==
The series features the following seven main characters throughout its run:

- Paul Winchell as Woofer, a bloodhound who would constantly accuse suspects without good reason, then later back-track while haughtily proclaiming his genius to satisfy his ego; he also wears a deerstalkers' cap on his head.
- Jim MacGeorge as Wimper, a more down-to-earth, easy-going, yet intelligent basset hound who would at times go along with Woofer’s schemes, and other times he would turn the tables on his comrade.
- David Jolliffe as Larry, the Club's eldest member at 18 years old and de-facto leader; he normally interviewed the suspect(s) and/or passed on their findings to Dottie.
- Patricia Stich as Pepper, Dottie's blonde and beautiful 15-year-old elder sister. Pepper searched for clues and/or evidence, mostly accompanied by D.D., which often lead to them being chased by the villains. The sisters' last name was never revealed.
- Bob Hastings as D.D., a bespectacled redhead wearing a Sherlock Holmes style hat, he often teamed up with Pepper to search for clues; it was never revealed what D.D.'s initials stood for. He is 16 years old.
- Tara Talboy as Dottie, the Club's youngest member, at 13 years old, she endured an arsenal of deprecating nicknames from her big sister Pepper and their friends: "half-pint", "short-stuff" and the like. A prodigy, she normally stayed at home; from there, Dottie provided case-solving information from her minicomputer and/or results from various forensic tests. She also had access to high-tech communications equipment, including audio/video links to the Club's car and to their wristwatches, which doubled as pagers. Dottie's friends were highly protective of her, and resented it when she joined them in the field...which the girl frequently did, after running out of "homework".
- John Stephenson as Sheriff Lester Bagley, the local sheriff who frequently relied on the Clue Club for assistance and arrested suspects at their conclusion; story editor Sid Morse's series-bible revealed the Sheriff's full name.

== Episodes ==
No.	Title	Original release date
1	"The Paper Shaper Caper"	September 4, 1976
The News Press has the press running without Mr. Kitrich's notice. The Clue Club have a lead on Ms. Twitchell and Dottie has a lead to the Apex Printing Company. While getting abducted in the theatre Larry, D.D. and Pepper find out about a counterfeiting scheme organized by Mr. Whitaker.
2	"The Case of the Lighthouse Mouse"	September 11, 1976
The Clue Club investigate a museum robbery in which the jewels are swiped one by one and Uncle Salty is suspected to be the thief. There seems to be a connection with the lighthouse Uncle Salty once worked in. Larry recreates the crime scene to expose the thief as Mr. Gooch and his trained mouse Barrymore.
3	"The Real Gone Gondola"	September 18, 1976
The Clue Club investigates a mysterious disappearance of Ms. Coldwell caused by someone named Vortex. After much traveling between home and Blizzard Mountain and avoiding mysterious encounters, they conclude Tom Coldwell caused all this in order to scare away the interested buyers of the ski resort.
4	"Who's to Blame for the Empty Frame?"	September 25, 1976
The Clue Club investigate a stolen million dollar painting in the Castle Museum. When Woofer and Wimper are assigned to guard a Ming vase, they get stolen, but they meet up with the Clue Club soon. Larry reveals the heist was carried out by a pantomimist Mr. Carlottie and the cleaner Mr. Tobais.
5	"The Weird Seaweed Caper"	October 2, 1976
The Clue Club investigate the dock area where a sea monster dwells. What spooks them is someone named Doomsday who seems to be observing them. After combing the shorelines, the Clue Club and Sheriff Bagley catch the three diamond smugglers who were able to conceal the diamonds in golf balls.
6	"The Green Thumb Caper"	October 9, 1976
The Clue Club investigate multiple robberies at Mr. Cosgrave's manor caused by some masked person in the dark. A trail leads to the suspects the butler Mr. Wilkins and the nursery gardener Ms. Carter who smuggled the jewels in Venus Flytraps.
7	"The Disappearing Airport Caper"	October 16, 1976
Pilot Corky requests the Clue Club to clear his name of an X7 plane hijack which carries insurance. After a major check through on Brock's cow pasture, Larry reveals that a fake airport had been temporarily placed here and Eddie himself stole and hid the plane after getting Corky to land.
8	"The Walking House Caper"	October 23, 1976
Mr. Lean asks the Clue Club to check it out a top security safe. The safe gets taken clean away. Mr. Benchley tells Larry that Mr. Lean's house moves around while everyone else is pursued by a Sasquatch. Larry reveals that safe was never stolen, but they were taken to an exact matching house by Mr. Benchley.
9	"The Solar Energy Caper"	October 30, 1976
The Clue Club visit a science fair. Just then, the new solar generator is stolen. With many suspects in mind, Larry, D.D and Pepper check out Reed's Electronics. A final check reveals that a hologram was placed within the exhibit instead of the actual device, all devised by the scientist Mr. Foster.
10	"The Vanishing Train Caper"	November 6, 1976
The Clue Club witness a train with a gold bullion vanish past a mountain. The only clue is iron pyrite pointing to the ghost town Dobson City. In an old mine nearby, the Clue Club find the stolen train and its gold which was diverted by an alternate track in the mountain, carried out by the train dispatcher.
11	"The Dissolving Statue Caper"	November 13, 1976
At the Fun Mountain amusement park, the Clue Club are presented with a magnificent statue owned by Bobo Cahuna. The statue then vanishes. Finding out that, this statue was made of sugar, the evidence indicates Mr. Crane crafted it and his pet monkey dissolved it and the real statue remained in the cargo it was shipped in. Before Mr. Crane is carried away, he asks one of his workers to watch his pet monkey while he is away.
12	"The Missing Pig Caper"	November 20, 1976
At the county fair, Sally takes the Clue Club to see her prize pig Sweet Pea, except he has been taken away. Dottie notifies a suspicious character, Mr. Glut's butler Mr. Cleek. After looking in the Glut residence, the pignapper is revealed to be the ice cream man who had the means to sell the pig to Mr. Glut.
13	"One of Our Elephants Is Missing"	November 25, 1976
The Clue Club go to the zoo to search for a missing elephant, but also some other animals. D.D.'s idea of disguising as a chimpanzee to stake out the thief doesn't work. At the docks, Chris Carloff and his accomplice Dr. Henkan are proved to be the thieves that smuggled the zoo animals.
14	"The Amazing Heist"	November 27, 1976
At the Rock Festival, the Crown of Dileria gets swiped. While searching, D.D. and Pepper are pursued by a werewolf. Dottie briefs a likely suspect Mr. Grayson. The whole theft was schemed by Madame Hortense who strongly believes the crown is hers by birthright.
15	"The Circus Caper"	December 4, 1976
On a trip to the circus the Clue Club, see the acrobat Karelli vanish. The case seems complicated since many people have their views against Karelli who was going to leave the circus anyway to work for someone else. The acrobats Tonio and Peter are revealed to be the ones trying so hard to get rid of Karelli to become the best team.
16	"The Prehistoric Monster Caper"	December 11, 1976
During a filming shoot of a cavepeople and dinosaur-themed movie, the director Mr. Simmons vanishes. D.D. and Pepper are chased by a dinosaur in their search for clues. Brett Winsome reveals the definite way Mr. Simmons disappeared. Mr. Wolf posed as Mr. Simmons and make it seem like the director disappeared.

== Broadcast history ==
Clue Club aired in these following formats on CBS:

- Clue Club (August 14, 1976 – September 3, 1977, CBS Saturday)
- The Skatebirds (as Woofer & Wimper, Dog Detectives) (September 10, 1977 – January 21, 1978, CBS Saturday) (rerun)
- The Three Robonic Stooges (as Woofer & Wimper, Dog Detectives) (January 28, 1978 – September 2, 1978, CBS Saturday) (rerun)
- Clue Club (September 10, 1978 – January 21, 1979, CBS Sunday) (rerun)

Broadcast schedules (all EDT):

- August 14, 1976 – September 4, 1976, CBS Saturday 9:30-10:00 AM
- September 11, 1976 – November 20, 1976, CBS Saturday 11:30 AM–12:00 PM
- November 27, 1976 – September 3, 1977, CBS Saturday 8:30-9:00 AM
- September 10, 1977 – November 12, 1977, CBS Saturday 9:30-10:30 AM
- November 19, 1977 – January 21, 1978, CBS Saturday 8:00-9:00 AM
- January 28, 1978 – September 2, 1978, CBS Saturday 8:00-8:30 AM
- September 10, 1978 – January 21, 1979, CBS Sunday 9:30-10:00 AM

== Merchandising ==
In 1977–79, merchandising for Clue Club included: a coloring book (Clue Club Saves the Day), story book (Clue Club: The Case of the Missing Racehorse by Fern G. Brown), read & color book (Clue Club: The Racetrack Mystery), jigsaw puzzles, rub-on transfers and a school tablet.

Marvel Comics featured Clue Club stories ("Mrs. Macree's Mystery" and "The Root of All Evil!") in two issues of the short-lived anthology comic series Hanna-Barbera TV Stars #2 (October 1978) and #4 (February 1979). Outside of these American comics, Clue Club stories were also featured in Clue Club Annual 1979 hardback book published by World Distributors in the United Kingdom.

A board game titled as "The Clue Club Game" was released only in Europe in 1979.

== Home media ==
On August 11, 2015, Warner Archive released Clue Club: The Complete Animated Series on DVD in region 1 as part of their Hanna–Barbera Classics Collection. This is a Manufacture-on-Demand (MOD) release, available exclusively through Warner's online store and Amazon.com.

== Other appearances ==
- D.D. made a cameo appearance in Scooby-Doo! Mask of the Blue Falcon.
- The cast of Clue Club appeared in Jellystone!. Larry, D.D. and Sheriff Bagley are dark-skinned in this continuity.
- The Clue Club are shown on a list in the Velma episode "Velma Makes a List".
