= Halls of Anger =

1970 film by Paul Bogart

- Theatrical release poster
- Directed by: Paul Bogart
- Written by: John Herman Shaner; Al Ramrus
- Produced by: Herbert Hirschman; Walter Mirisch
- Starring: Calvin Lockhart; Janet MacLachlan; James A. Watson Jr. Jeff Bridges
- Cinematography: Burnett Guffey
- Edited by: Bud Molin
- Music by: Dave Grusin
- Production company: The Mirisch Corporation
- Distributed by: United Artists
- Release date: April 29, 1970 (United States)
- Running time: 96 minutes
- Country: United States
- Language: English
- Budget: $1.6 million

Halls of Anger is a 1970 American drama film directed by Paul Bogart, and starring Calvin Lockhart, Janet MacLachlan, Jeff Bridges (in his first credited role) and James A. Watson Jr.

== Plot ==
A predominantly black high school is integrated by white students and trouble follows.

== Cast ==
- Calvin Lockhart as Quincy Davis
- Janet MacLachlan as Lorraine Nash
- Jeff Bridges as Doug
- James A. Watson Jr. as J.T. Watson
- DeWayne Jessie as Lerone Johnson
- Ed Asner as Ernie McKay
- John McLiam as Boyd Wilkerson
- Rob Reiner as "Leaky" Couloris
- Patricia Stich as Sherry Vaughn
- Gary Tigerman as Buchavitch
- Paris Earl as Carter (credited as Paris Earle)
- Ta-Tanisha as Claudine
- Helen Kleeb as Rita Monahan
- Barry Brown as Winger

• Stunts by Stunt Coordinator Ernie Robinson

== Background ==
The film was mostly filmed at Virgil Middle School in Los Angeles.

The film draws some comparisons to a contemporary television program, Room 222: A new, black teacher joins a southern California high school; an attractive, sympathetic black female member of staff shows romantic interest; a militant black student is frequently involved in situations; issues of racism and integration are featured. The film and television show even share actors (Ta-Tanisha, Helen Kleeb, Rob Reiner). However, while Room 222 is a comedy-drama, much milder in tone, Halls of Anger is purposefully aggressive, using deliberately controversial language and some forceful violence to highlight the very real and dangerous potential of unresolved racial conflict.

The film production's behind-the-scenes tension was the subject of an article written by Budd Schulberg in the 21 August 1970 issue of LIFE.

== Reception ==
=== Critical response ===
Roger Greenspun, the film critic for The New York Times, gave the film a mixed review, and wrote, "The picture initially portends sensationalism, with the racial scales reversed and the well-behaved white youngsters harassed and tormented by the black students. What steadies the whole thing is the excellent performance of Calvin Lockhart, as a sane, realistic Negro teacher who more or less holds together the teeming school and the picture itself...But the picture's urgent plea for racial sanity in the classroom is almost methodically blunted by the use of standard-seeming types. The few faculty whites are oafs or hard-heads. There is the pretty Negro teacher, nicely played by Janet MacLachlan, who supports and comforts Lockhart. As the fieriest black student and the spunkiest white newcomer, James A. Watson Jr. and Jeff Bridges do well in characterizations that rate more exploration."

Film critic Monica Sullivan praised the acting of Jeff Bridges, if not the film, "The young Bridges stands out in the cast, because his focus on his role is like a laser beam. He pours 100% of his energy into making his character believable and it is. The making of Halls Of Anger might be a more riveting experience than the film itself."

== See also ==
- List of American films of 1970
- List of hood films
