= Assault on the Wayne =

- Genre: Thriller; War; Action
- Written by: Jackson Gillis
- Directed by: Marvin J. Chomsky
- Starring: Joseph Cotten; Lloyd Haynes; Dewey Martin; Leonard Nimoy; William Windom
- Theme music composer: Leith Stevens
- Country of origin: United States
- Original language: English

Production
- Cinematography: Howard Schwartz
- Editor: Donald R. Rode
- Running time: 75 min.
- Production company: Paramount Television

Original release
- Network: ABC
- Release: January 12, 1971

Assault on the Wayne is a 1971 American Cold War-themed action thriller TV film starring Joseph Cotten, Lloyd Haynes, Dewey Martin, Leonard Nimoy and William Windom. It aired on January 12, 1971, in the ABC Movie of the Week space. The film was originally broadcast on the same night as All in the Family premiered.

== Premise ==
A US Navy nuclear submarine is sabotaged to steal an anti-ballistic missile guidance system.

== Cast ==
- Joseph Cotten as Admiral
- Lloyd Haynes as Lt. Dave Burston
- Dewey Martin as Lt. Cmdr Skip Langley
- Leonard Nimoy as Commander Phil Kettenring
- William Windom as Lt. Frank Reardon
- Keenan Wynn as Orville Kelly
- Malachi Throne as Dr. Dykers
- Sam Elliott as Ensign William 'Bill' Sandover
- Ivor Barry as Donald Ellington
- Ron Masak as CPO Corky Schmidt
- Lee Stanley as Lt. Manners
