= Patricia Stich =

American actress (1940–2025)

- Born: January 1, 1940
- Died: February 2025 (aged 85); California, U.S.
- Occupation: Actress
- Spouse: Larry Merchant (m. 1963)

Patricia Stich (January 1, 1940 – February 2025) was an American actress, also credited as Pat Stich.

== Early years ==
Stich's parents were Mr. and Mrs. I. R. Stich. She was born in Manchester, Connecticut, and graduated from Conard High School in West Hartford, Connecticut. She graduated from the University of Rochester with majors in psychology and English literature. Her role in a university production of Guys and Dolls ignited her interest in acting as a career. She extended her education with two years' study at the New York Neighborhood Playhouse, supplemented with studies of modern dance.

== Career ==
=== Acting ===
Stich acted in summer stock theater at the Rockland County Playhouse in Blauvelt, New York. She had a semi-regular role in The Nurses on television. Her credits included Halls of Anger (1970) and The Loners (1972). Stich also appeared in various supporting roles in television series during the 1970s-80s. She also provided the voice for the character of Pepper in the animated series Clue Club and The Skatebirds (1976 and 1977, respectively).

=== Photography ===
In 1970 Stich developed an interest in photography. After she built a darkroom she obtained photojournalistic assignments for national magazines. An invitation to participate in a month-long tour of China with young writers and performers led to her taking more than 2,000 photographs, some of which she used in a book that she was writing in 1973.

== Personal life and death ==
Stich was married to sportswriter and commentator Larry Merchant. They had a daughter. She died after a long illness in California in February 2025, at the age of 85.

== Filmography ==
=== Film ===
Year	Title	Role	Notes
1972	The Loners	Julio	Drama
1970	Halls of Anger	Sherry Vaughn	Drama

=== Television series ===
Year	Title	Role	Notes
1980	Too Close for Comfort	News reporter	Who's Afraid of the Big Bad Wolfe? Season 1, Episode 7
1978	Laverne & Shirley	Evelyn	Debutante Ball Season 3, Episode 21
1977	The Skatebirds	Pepper (voice)	Woofer & Wimper, Dog Detectives segment in 16 Episodes
1976	The Rockford Files	Phyllis	Coulter City WildcatSeason 3, Episode 6
1976	Clue Club	Pepper (voice)	Season 1, 16 Episodes
1973	Love, American Style	Karen	(segment "Love and the Hot Spell") Season 4, Episode 18
1973	Griff	Gracie Newcombe	Season 1 Episode 1-13
1972	All in the Family	Tammy Robinson	Gloria and the Riddle Season 3, Episode 4
1970	Mannix	Hally	The Mouse that died Season 4, Episode 5
