= The Whereabouts of Jenny =

- Written by: John Miglis
- Directed by: Gene Reynolds
- Starring: Ed O'Neill; Debrah Farentino; Eve Gordon; David Graf; Dakin Matthews; Lee Garlington
- Composer: Patrick Williams
- Country of origin: United States
- Original language: English

Production
- Producer: Gene Reynolds
- Cinematography: Jonathan West
- Editor: Skip Schoolnik
- Running time: 105 minutes
- Production companies: Columbia Pictures Television; Katie Face Productions

Original release
- Network: ABC
- Release: January 14, 1991

The Whereabouts of Jenny is a 1991 American made-for-television drama film directed by Gene Reynolds and written by John Miglis. The film stars Ed O'Neill, Debrah Farentino, Eve Gordon, David Graf, Dakin Matthews and Lee Garlington. The film premiered on ABC on January 14, 1991.

== Plot ==
Jimmy O'Meara loves his daughter more than anything in the world. But when his ex-wife gets involved with a man who's involved with criminals, his world is turned upside down. They have entered the Witness Protection Program and the government attorney who is in charge of the program is being highly uncooperative with Mr. O'Meara's request that he be granted access to his daughter. This starts an intense legal battle.

== Cast ==
- Ed O'Neill as Jimmy O'Meara
- Debrah Farentino as Liz
- Eve Gordon as Theresa
- David Graf as Scranton
- Dakin Matthews as Cox
- Lee Garlington as Gina
- Arnetia Walker as Louise
- Steven Williams as Mick
- Savannah Smith Boucher as Roosevelt
- Cliff Bemis as Barker
- Cassy Friel as Jenny
- Dan Hedaya as Vinnie
- Mike Farrell as Van Zandt
- Michael Crabtree as DeSantos
- Abraham Alvarez as Judge Ruiz
- Vinny Argiro as FBI Agent Borelli
- Harold Ayer as Judge Powers
- Catherine Rusoff as Andrea
- Kathleen Coyne as Psychiatrist
- Ellen Crawford as Clerk
- Al Mancini as Mr. Russo
- Sylvia Short as Rose
- Ta-Tanisha as Scranton's Secretary
- Victor Contreras as Garcia
