= List of Room 222 episodes =

The following is a list of episodes of the American television drama series Room 222. It ran for five seasons on ABC.

== Series overview ==
Season	Episodes	Originally released		Rank	Rating
Season	Episodes	First released	Last released	Rank	Rating
1	26	September 17, 1969	March 18, 1970	—N/a	—N/a
2	26	September 23, 1970	April 7, 1971	—N/a	—N/a
3	23	September 17, 1971	March 3, 1972	28	19.8 (Note: Tied with Cannon)
4	23	September 15, 1972	March 9, 1973	—N/a	—N/a
5	15 (Note: The fifteenth produced episode of the fifth season never aired.)	September 14, 1973	January 11, 1974	—N/a	—N/a

== Episodes ==
=== Season 1 (1969–70) ===
No. overall	No. in season	Title	Directed by	Written by	Original release date	Prod. code
1	1	"Richie's Story"	Gene Reynolds	James L. Brooks	September 17, 1969	4901
In the pilot episode (which opens as essentially a continuation of the scenes in the opening credits), Pete Dixon teaches history in Room 222 at Walt Whitman High School. Principal Seymour Kaufman introduces Pete to Alice Johnson, a perky but painfully insecure student teacher. Pete's most enthusiastic student is Richie Lane, who goes so far as to dress a lot like Pete and even takes roll in his absence. But Guidance Counselor Liz McIntire has discovered some disturbing news about Richie -- the home address he submitted is fake, suggesting that he may not live in the district.
2	2	"Naked Came We into the World"	Alan Rafkin	George Kirgo	September 24, 1969	4906
When one of the long-time teachers resigns as the advisor for the Junior Class Night, a musical presentation, Alice Johnson eagerly volunteers for the position. Principal Kaufman is reluctant at first to appoint her, but he relents under pressure from Pete Dixon and Liz McIntyre. Alice promises the class that it will be "their" presentation, and that she will allow them to run it the way that they want. She comes to regret this, however, when her shyest student, Helen Loomis, comes up with an unforgettable finale: everyone in the cast will strip naked on stage.
3	3	"Funny Boy"	Gene Reynolds	Allan Burns	October 1, 1969	4907
One of Pete Dixon's fellow history teachers complains about a boy named Harvey Butcher, who continually disrupts his American history class. When Principal Kaufman suggests that they may have to transfer Butcher to another school, Pete Dixon argues that the school administration isn't working with the boy. Kaufman, aided by a suggestion from Alice Johnson, decides instead to reassign him to Pete's history class. Pete initially finds that he's gotten more than he bargained for -- but he also sees a talent for humor and imagination in the boy and tries to find a more productive outlet for his talents.
4	4	"The Coat"	Gene Reynolds	Michael Zagor	October 8, 1969	4908
Liz McIntyre is concerned about Jason Allen, who believes that he's not college material, and also that he's unlikely to get far in life because of his race. When she discovers that Jason is a talented artist, however, she arranges for him to get a job at a local department store's art department. Jason thanks her by giving her an expensive coat -- only it slowly dawns on Liz that the coat was likely stolen, not purchased.
5	5	"The Flu"	Leo Penn	Allan Burns	October 15, 1969	4902
A city-wide flu epidemic causes so many teachers to call in sick that the very real possibility of having to close Walt Whitman High looms for Principal Seymour Kaufman. In the meantime, Kaufman's son Martin unexpectedly shows up from a year-and-a-half stint in the Peace Corps in Uganda. Martin's background as a teacher comes in handy because of the shortage of teachers caused by the epidemic -- but his continuing presence at Whitman also brings up unresolved emotional issues between him and his father.
6	6	"First We'll Eat, Then We'll Strike"	Gene Reynolds	Treva Silverman	October 22, 1969	4904
News reports suggest that a proposed school bond will fail by a large margin, and its defeat will mean cutting several programs at Walt Whitman High. The teachers initially propose only adopting a petition in support of the bond, but when Pete Dixon is elected to head a group of teachers to take a more active stance in favor of the bond, they decide to go on a half-day strike and to stage a demonstration to bring attention to their position -- much to the dismay of Principal Kaufman, who, although he supports the bond, sees the action as a useless gesture that might jeopardize its passing.
7	7	"Teacher's Dropping Out"	Gene Reynolds	Peggy Elliot	October 29, 1969	4905
Two men from a company named Automation West, which helps find employment for high school dropouts, come to visit Walt Whitman. Although they have worked with Pete Dixon on assisting dropouts in the past, their goal this time is to offer him a job with their company, at a substantial increase in salary. Pete is tempted by the offer, particularly because it will still involve working with kids -- but the possibility of his departure creates great consternation for his coworkers, especially Principal Kaufman, as well as among his students.
8	8	"Our Teacher Is Obsolete"	William Wiard	Ronald Rubin	November 5, 1969	4910
Liz McIntyre is assigned to substitute in the "Preparation for Marriage" class taught by middle-aged Miss Tandy. Liz discovers that the class is based entirely on Miss Tandy reading aloud from a book composed of notes she has compiled over the years, much of which is no longer relevant to her students' lives. Liz decides to put the book aside to lead a discussion among the students -- something the students like so much that they ask for Liz to replace Miss Tandy as the teacher for the class.
9	9	"Triple Date"	Gerald Meyer	Jeanne Taylor	November 12, 1969	4911
Jason Allen becomes smitten with a girl from the school named Elaine Harris. Elaine and Jason hit it off, but their attempt at a first date is spoiled by her uptight, somewhat conservative father, who doesn't take to Jason's laconic style and apparent lack of ambition. Then Jason comes up with an elaborate plan to use Richie Lane, the buttoned-down class overachiever, as a go-between to get Elaine out of her house for a date -- but things don't go quite as Jason hoped.
10	10	"Fathers and Sons"	Terry Becker	John Whedon, Ron Rubin	November 19, 1969	4912
Pete Dixon's class is studying civil disobedience apostle Henry David Thoreau, and Pete mentions that the city is planning to cut down the trees along his street to widen it for better traffic circulation. His class is inspired to show up there to stage a protest against the removal of the trees. The ringleader is Grady Garrett, an impressionable young student who already clashes frequently with his father, a doctor who is distressed that Grady doesn't want to follow him into the profession. Grady's father decides that the cause of Grady's new-found rebelliousness is a result of his desire to seek his own future.
11	11	"Alice in Blunderland"	Lee Philips	Steve Pritzker	November 26, 1969	4914
Alice Johnson is due for a review by the school district's supervisor of student teachers, and she's nervous about teaching the class by herself. Pete Dixon first tries letting her teach while he's present, but then decides that the best thing is to let her "go solo" without him -- which first leads to Alice losing control of the class, and then overcompensating by exercising iron discipline. With the day of her review approaching, Alice begins to wonder whether teaching is the right profession for her after all.
12	12	"Clothes Make the Boy"	Lee Philips	Allan Burns	December 3, 1969	4913
The sometimes outlandish clothing that the students are wearing to school, especially one boy named Jerry Shaffer, has become an issue at Walt Whitman, with some complaining that Principal Kaufman is failing to enforce the dress code. Kaufman, backed by Pete Dixon, sees that the dress code (adopted in 1940) may need some updating, but isn't sure how far to go. Kaufman appoints a committee composed of parents and teachers, chaired by Pete, to advise him on the issue. Pete however, pushes to have student participation on the committee -- which ends up including both students, parents and teachers.
13	13	"Seventeen Going on Twenty-Eight"	Terry Becker	Allan Burns	December 10, 1969	4915
Pete Dixon is at a diner alone when a young woman asks his help to avoid a man she claims was stalking her. He buys her dinner and drives her home, but draws the line when she tries to become romantic. Then Pete discovers that she's actually a 17 year-old student from Walt Whitman who set up their meeting because she has an infatuation with him -- that she hopes will end in marriage.
14	14	"The Exchange Teacher"	William Wiard	Treva Silverman	December 17, 1969	4916
Walt Whitman High has arranged for an exchange teacher from England, Dora Hughes, who teaches creative writing and surprises the students with her novel approach to teaching -- including no permanent seating, no assignments, and the use of songs from Simon & Garfunkel and The Beatles in classroom discussions. While this energizes the students' interest in writing, some of her other quirks -- such as disregarding the bell schedule, not taking roll, and leading her students off on impromptu field trips -- place her on a collision course with the administration, including the principal, Mr. Kaufman.
15	15	"El Genio"	William Wiard	T : Ronald Rubin; S/T : Doug Tibbles	December 24, 1969	4909
Robert Salazar, a Mexican-American student with a high aptitude but who is indifferent about school, comes alive one day during a discussion of the Alamo in Pete Dixon's class. Alice Johnson decides to make him her "special project," hoping to convince him to consider college instead of going to work immediately after high school. At first, Salazar follows her suggestions, but soon runs into some frustrating dead ends, and not only gives up on college, but decides to quit Walt Whitman.
16	16	"Arizona State Loves You"	Leo Penn	Patrick Hobby	December 31, 1969	4903
More than 100 colleges are competing to recruit Whitman's talented halfback, Ronnie Moore. Uncertain about which school to select, Ronnie turns to Seymour Kaufman and Pete Dixon for advice. They accompany Ronnie to Atlantic State, where one of its former star players, Jim Williams, takes Ronnie on a tour of the school -- which also happens to be Seymour Kaufman's alma mater. But as they speak to some of the school's officials and its current football players, Seymour and Pete learn some disturbing things about the school's treatment of student-athletes -- and about Jim Williams.
17	17	"Operation Sandpile"	Richard Kinon	George Kirgo	January 7, 1970	4918
Walt Whitman High -- and Principal Kaufman -- is plagued with two problems on the same day. First, Pam Hundley is forced to bring her infant sister to Pete Dixon's class when the babysitter fails to show up; this starts a spate of students bringing their younger siblings to school. Then Sara Olson, another of Pete's students, begins to complain that she doesn't understand how the required high school courses have any value for her life, when her long-term ambition is to marry and raise a family. This gives Kaufman an idea that may allow him to solve both problems at the same me.
18	18	"Play It Loose"	Norman Abbott	T : Steve Pritzker; S/T : Peggy Elliott, Ed Scharlach	January 14, 1970	4919
Walt Whitman is planning an assembly to encourage its students to stay in school, but Pete Dixon is concerned that it won't be enough to convince Whitman's contemporary students. He recalls seeing former Whitman student Michelle Scott, now a famous singer, joking about how she was a high school dropout, and suggests that she might actually be embarrassed by her lack of a diploma. Pete and Liz McIntyre convince her to make an appearance at the assembly, and afterward, she continues working on the problem of student dropouts. But Liz fears that her efforts may be more damaging than helpful.
19	19	"Goodbye, Mr. Hip"	Terry Becker	Dale McRaven	January 21, 1970	4920
Pete Dixon has his doubts about Roger Duncan, who teaches government at Whitman, but tries to pass himself off as a peer to the students with his flamboyant dress, "with it" lingo, and seemingly liberal attitude toward marijuana. Duncan changes his attitude quickly, however, when the students in his class plant what appears to be a joint on his desk -- and he's accused of bringing drugs to school. Guest Star: Bernie Kopell.
20	20	"Once Upon a Time There Was Air You Couldn't See"	Lee Philips	John D.F. Black	January 28, 1970	4921
A discussion in Pete Dixon's class about the difference that one person can make leads Jason and Richie to become involved in a class project -- to raise the money to purchase 1 minute of air time on a local television station to try to raise awareness about air pollution. Jason and Richie also have to write and produce the announcement -- and when they start looking for an announcer, they decide that Pete Dixon himself would be the perfect choice.
21	21	"The Whole World Can Hear You"	Malcolm Black	E. Arthur Kean	February 11, 1970	4923
Liz McIntyre finds herself caught between the desires of Sharon Stopps, one of the students she counsels, and Sharon's obnoxious, overbearing father. Sharon has decided that she would prefer to become a beautician instead of going to college, something that her blue-collar father doesn't understand. So he insists -- loudly and frequently -- that Liz change Sharon's class schedule to one that will make her college-bound.
22	22	"Ralph"	Leo Penn	Steve Pritzker	February 18, 1970	4917
Pete Dixon starts teaching an evening adult education class at Walt Whitman to earn some extra money, and discovers that the students are much more interested and motivated to learn the subject than his daytime high school students. On the other hand, he finds himself plagued by self-described "history nut" Ralph Fisk, whose love for the subject makes it hard to carry on a conversation with Ralph about anything else -- and who "adopts" Pete as his new best friend because Pete it too polite to refuse Ralph's attentions.
23	23	"I Love You Charlie, I Love You Abbie"	John Erman	John D. F. Black	February 25, 1970	4925
Charlie and Abby, two of Walt Whitman's students, approach Pete Dixon and Liz McIntyre to announce that they are planning to marry at the end of the semester, and to request that Pete and Liz be the couple's best man and maid of honor, respectively. Pete and Liz believe it would be a mistake for the couple to marry so young, so they try to befriend them, hoping to persuade them gently to reconsider. Charlie and Abby mistake Liz and Pete's entreaties as approval, and announce that they have decided to move up their wedding date to the following weekend.
24	24	"The New Boy"	Gene Reynolds	Ronald Rubin	March 4, 1970	4926
A new transfer student, Dennis Joplin, comes to Walt Whitman from John Adams High, and brings with him a lengthy disciplinary record. He provides a reasonable explanation for some of his behavior to Seymour Kaufman and Pete Dixon -- but within a short time they begin to realize that Dennis has a much more serious problem -- he lies almost all the time about almost everything.
25	25	"Funny Money"	Gene Reynolds	Ronald Rubin	March 11, 1970	4924
Principal Seymour Kaufman asks Pete Dixon to take over a remedial reading class that the current teacher has trouble controlling. Pete finds that the students are sarcastic and unmotivated, and so he decides to try something unorthodox: pay the students if they will do their assignments.
26	26	"Just Between Friends"	Hal Cooper	George Atkins	March 18, 1970	4922
Over Principal Seymour Kaufman's objections, the school district forces Walt Whitman to accept hundreds of new students on short notice, causing significant unhappiness among the teachers. Kaufman approaches Pete Dixon, who holds an important position with the P.T.A., and asks him not to raise objections about Whitman's new enrollees at the upcoming P.T.A. meeting, but Dixon feels that he must stand up for this fellow teachers -- causing a serious rift in Dixon's relationship with Kaufman.

=== Season 2 (1970–71) ===
No. overall	No. in season	Title	Directed by	Written by	Original release date	Prod. code
27	1	"Write On, Brother"	Terry Becker	John D. F. Black	September 23, 1970	E-503
A group of students who are tired of the school administration's control over the school newspaper decide to start their own underground newspaper about life at Walt Whitman High. For their premiere issue, they interview Pete Dixon, who agrees to keep their identities a secret. But that first issue also includes a "teacher evaluation" column -- which makes a number of nasty comments about several teachers, including Alice Johnson.
28	2	"The Laughing Majority"	Gene Reynolds	S : Charles Cooper; T : Richard DeRoy	September 30, 1970	E-502
With the student council election coming up, Pete Dixon complains to his class about student apathy, noting that less than a quarter of the student body is even registered to vote. The election features a contest between a serious candidate for school president, David Kane, and the football team's quarterback, who sees it mostly as a popularity contest. But then the election is thrown into disarray by the surprise candidacy of class clown Harvey Butcher as the "anti-candidate" - whose humor and mockery of the process ignites new interest in the election, even as it unraveling.
29	3	"The Lincoln Story"	Charles S. Dubin	S : Lewis Paire; T : Bud Freeman	October 7, 1970	E-507
Pete Dixon has been nominated for the statewide award of "History Teacher of the Year." When the committee evaluating his teaching methods comes to his classroom, they happen to sit in on an open discussion about Abraham Lincoln's place in American history. But when Jason Allen makes some inflammatory comments about Lincoln's character and accuses him of harboring racist beliefs about black Americans, one of the evaluators storms out of Pete's classroom in disgust.
30	4	"Adam's Lib"	William Wiard	William Wood	October 14, 1970	E-505
Several of the girls at Walt Whitman begin to protest their treatment at the hands of both the male students and the administration. Their ringleader is Sandy, whose persistence wins an unexpected victory when another girl is allowed to take auto shop. But then there is some backlash -- and ridicule -- from those who see "women's libbers" as trying to change the sex roles too radically. Sandy, however, sees a chance to win respect from the school and the male students by having Pat Halloran, a gifted female athlete, compete for a spot on the boys' basketball team.
31	5	"Choose One: They Lived (Happily/Unhappily) Ever After"	Richard Kinon	John D.F. Black	October 21, 1970	E-504
Pete Dixon participates in a pilot program that cross-trains teachers to become administrators, and finds himself in the vice-principal's office alongside Gil Casey, a tough disciplinarian who believes that no student who comes into his office ever tells the truth. Pete tries to take a softer approach with the students, putting him on a collision course with Casey - even though he reluctantly begins to see that Casey may be right about the duplicity of at least some of the students.
32	6	"Captain of the Team"	Charles S. Dubin	Bud Freeman	October 28, 1970	E-508
Conflicts develop between two students, Craig Jackson and Brendan Michaels, Craig, a short-haired, straight-laced type who respects authority and often exercises it as a hall monitor, and Brendan an easygoing free spirit with long hair who abides to authority grudgingly if at all. Tension boils over, however, when the track coach becomes ill and Pete Dixon takes over for the balance of the season. Pete relaxes the discipline and permits students with long hair to play for the team -- including Brendan Michaels, who is an excellent pole vaulter. This doesn't sit well with Craig Jackson.
33	7	"Only a Rose"	Gene Reynolds	Ronald Rubin	November 4, 1970	E-501
Parents' Day at Walt Whitman brings with it an unexpected visitor named Rose Lipton, who follows Pam Simpson into Pete Dixon's class and regales the students with stories about her experiences as an immigrant - the topic that the class happens to be discussing. Although she is welcome in Pete's class, she makes similar impromptu presentations in other classes, and the teachers' complaints lead Principal Kaufman to ask her to stay away from the campus. This prompts several of the students to try to find some way that she can remain at Whitman even though she has no standing in the district.
34	8	"The Fuzz That Grooved"	Terry Becker	John D.F. Black	November 11, 1970	E-509
Walt Whitman and its surrounding area is patrolled during the school day by police officer Harry Collin, whom many of the students and faculty respect for his easygoing, cooperative attitude. But one person who does not like Collin's approach to police work is hard-nosed vice-principal Gil Casey, who, along with some of the local citizens, complains to Collin's superiors. This leads to disillusionment among the students when Collin informs Pete Dixon that he's been reassigned.
35	9	"Half Way"	Ivan Dixon	Richard DeRoy	November 18, 1970	E-510
Pete Dixon has a friend, Jerry Colby, with whom he jogs regularly, and who has two children at Walt Whitman High. Pete learns that Jerry's daughter, Sheila, is transferring to a private school. Despite his friendship with Pete and his insistence that the transfer is so that Sheila can take advantage of the music and arts program at the private school, Jerry's and Sheila's inconsistent stories about why she is leaving lead Pete to suspect that Jerry wants to get Sheila out of racially-integrated Whitman High.
36	10	"Dreams of Glory"	Bob Sweeney	Anthony Lawrence	November 25, 1970	E-512
Larry Ellison, a diminutive student of Pete Dixon's, lacks confidence in himself because of his size, and especially because he is taunted mercilessly by much larger fellow student Vic Martin. Pete suggests that Larry take up karate to build his self-esteem, and Larry begins to study under a karate master (real-life martial arts champion Chuck Norris, playing himself). Larry's efforts eventually begin to pay off, but Pete starts to have second thoughts when Larry becomes determined to use his new skills not just in self-defense, but also to settle his score with Vic, a rival for the affection of the girl Larry likes.
37	11	"The Valediction"	John Erman	Richard DeRoy	December 2, 1970	E-511
With another year's graduation approaching, Alice Johnson convinces Walt Whitman's administration to have an open competition to select the class valedictorian instead of simply relying on the students' grades. The unexpected winner of the competition, however, is perpetual underachiever -- and occasional troublemaker -- Stan Siebert. As graduation day approaches, some of the faculty and Principal Kaufman begin to worry that Siebert will not simply deliver his speech that won the competition, but instead use the valediction to make a fiery denunciation of the school and it's policies.
38	12	"Mel Wertz and the Nickel-Plated Toothpick"	Richard Kinon	Bob Rodgers	December 16, 1970	E-514
Several students at Walt Whitman have formed a band, the Nickel-Plated Toothpick, that has a shot at a recording contract with a Nashville record producer, thanks to the efforts of the band's manager, Sam Cousins, who operates a local discotheque. The band's lead guitarist, however, Mel Wertz, is deeply conflicted -- his dream is to be a teacher, but going forward with the recording contract and the required touring and publicity will mean missing that semester's finals -- and perhaps giving up on his dream of being a teacher.
39	13	"What Would We Do Without Bobbie?"	William Wiard	William Wood	December 23, 1970	E-506
Both her fellow students and her teachers at Walt Whitman are impressed by the drive and energy constantly exhibited by Bobbie Walstone, and the "Generation Gap" prom is no exception. Bobbie volunteers for three different roles in helping to make the prom a success. But as the day of the dance draws near, some of the students are dismayed to discover that Bobbie herself has no date for the big night.
40	14	"Cheating"	Richard Kinon	Bud Freeman	January 6, 1971	E-513
Walt Whitman pupil Chris Beaumont is apparently one of the few students who does not cheat in the math class of no-nonsense teacher Howard Bruckner. When Bruckner unfairly accuses Beaumont of cheating, too, however, Beaumont begins to think that perhaps he should take the easier way out, too -- especially when another student, Ferdie Landis, offers him an "advance copy" of Bruckner's next exam.
41	15	"How About That Cherry Tree"	Hy Averback	Albert Rubin	January 13, 1971	E-515
Pam Arnold is thrilled when she is awarded a scholarship to one of the best art schools in the country. But when Principal Seymour Kaufman thanks Ken Dragen, the head of the English Department, for recommending her for the scholarship, he denies ever having signed her application form.
42	16	"Mr. Bomberg"	William Wiard	Nicholas E. Baehr	January 20, 1971	E-518
Walt Whitman welcomes a new civics teacher, Mr. Bomberg, whose previous experience teaching was in New York and New Jersey. Bomberg's approach to teaching civics, however, is to use shouting, insults, and physical isolation of students who aren't prepared for the day's lesson. When this leads most of his class to request a transfer en masse, a parents' committee demands that he be replaced. But Bomberg has a surprise defender -- soft-spoken Pete Dixon, whose own teaching methods are diametrically the opposite of Bomberg's approach.
43	17	"The Long Honeymoon"	Terry Becker	William Wood	January 27, 1971	E-516
Walt Whitman Principal Seymour Kaufman takes a personal interest in the situation of one student, Jerry Cates, who is a standout basketball player but whose grades have been tumbling, and who frequently falls asleep in class. Kaufman discovers that Jerry's mother has more or less abandoned him, forcing him to take on a night job just to pay the rent -- meaning that Jerry may end up in a foster home unless some other arrangements for his welfare.
44	18	"Opportunity Room"	Gene Reynolds	T : Ronald Rubin & Bud Freeman; S/T : Isobel Marchand	February 3, 1971	E-520
Liz McIntyre is rotated to the "opportunity room," a kind of detention in a classroom setting. Her most difficult charges are Tamara, a dreamy girl who nevertheless excels at art; and George Badgely, who resents authority and is the most difficult student to reach. Beset with a room full of troublemakers, Liz decides to take up George's contention that teachers are the problem: she has the students help each other with their best subjects -- and tries putting George himself in charge of the class.
45	19	"The Last Full Moon"	William Wiard	T : Bud Freeman; S/T : Robert Soboroff	February 10, 1971	E-519
Charlie Morano and Abbie Domier confess that they have been married for more than four months while keeping the marriage a secret, having disregarded advice from Pete Dixon and Liz McIntyre that they should wait to tie the knot. Faced with the fact of Charlie's and Abbie's marriage, however, Pete and Liz now suggest that the newlyweds admit the truth to their parents -- whatever the consequences.
46	20	"Hip Hip Hooray"	Richard Kinon	Albert Ruben	February 17, 1971	E-521
Feelings are running high between Walt Whitman High and its arch-rival, Daniel Webster High before the annual football game between the two schools. Whitman's principal and that of Webster are even considering canceling the game, fearing a riot between the two student bodies. Pete Dixon, however, proposes that the students be allowed to organize a "cool it" campaign to stress rivalry without violence. But he runs into resistance from Augie Cerutti, the captain of Whitman's football team, who is determined to win the campaign against Webster using any means available.
47	21	"Paul Revere Rides Again"	William Wiard	Antholy Lawerance	March 3, 1971	E-523
Someone has been committing acts of vandalism, such as dumping a bag of trash on some students during lunch, to call attention to the growing problem of pollution. The culprit disguises himself as "Paul Revere," and signs notes taking credit for the actions with Revere's name. Pete Dixon, however, figures out that the perpetrator is one of his students who holds Revere in high esteem. When Pete guesses the truth, the student swears him to secrecy -- but Pete has trouble abiding by his promise when the vandalism escalates to more serious -- and potentially criminal -- and other liability.
48	22	"I Hate You, Silas Marner"	Michael Gordon	Steve Kandel	March 10, 1971	E-526
Alice Johnson finds herself exhausted to the point of collapse, as she not only teaches class by day, but also spends hours grading papers - in between counseling students about the problems in their personal lives. Her problems begin to turn into a crisis, however, when she agrees to let the students read "Catch-22" before tackling "Silas Marner", and then is caught having signed a less than truthful note about where one of her students was after school.
49	23	"You Can Take a Big Boy Out of the Country, But..."	Richard Kinon	Dale McRaven	March 17, 1971	E-522
New student Mathew Palmer, a naive country boy, is taken advantage of by the class-wise guys --until he learns to fight back.
50	24	"If It's Not Here, Where Is It?"	Ivan Dixon	Dan Balluk	March 24, 1971	E-525
Former Walt Whitman student Monty Harris returns after two years in the Marines to finish his senior year at his old high school. He expects that he will now be admired by the other students because of his real-world experience. But he finds that the language and the mind-set of the students has changed from what he remembers, and that their attitude toward him is different from what he anticipates.
51	25	"Laura Fay, You're Okay!"	Terry Becker	Joanna Lee	March 31, 1971	E-517
Many of the boys in Alice Johnson's English class over-react to Laura Fay, a transfer student whom they find quite attractive. Laura Fay herself is a sensitive young woman who loves poetry, and who jumps at the chance to try out for a "College Bowl"-style competition between Whitman and other high schools. But as the harassment by her male peers continues, she decides to drop out of the competition -- and perhaps out of school as well.
52	26	"A Sort of Living"	Charles S. Dubin	John D.F. Black	April 7, 1971	E-524
Principal Seymour Kaufman is concerned about the prevalence of drug use at Whitman, and asks for suggestions on how the teachers can help the students with this problem. Pete Dixon suggests setting aside a room where anyone who wants -- students or teachers -- can enter at certain times and talk freely, with assurances that nothing said will leave the room. At first, the approach draws little interest from the students -- but then as it begins to show some promise, the school board decides it might want to shut the project down.

=== Season 3 (1971–72) ===
No. overall	No. in season	Title	Directed by	Written by	Original release date	Prod. code
53	1	"KWWH"	Seymour Robbie	Douglas Day Stewart	September 17, 1971	F-201
Pete Dixon encourages his students in operating a school radio station. But a feud with school board member Morris Henry takes a nasty turn with threats of censorship and to Mr. Kaufman's job as the students play damaging recordings.
54	2	"The Stutterer"	Richard Kinon	Bernie Kahn	September 24, 1971	F-202
Student Ben has a terrible stutter and although most are sympathetic he encounters occasional ridicule. Mr. Dixon tries to help but the arrival of an audio machine has made Ben the subject of a prank and he wants payback.
55	3	"America's Guest"	Seymour Robbie	Tom & Hellen August	October 1, 1971	F-203
Attractive, athletic student Tom causes a stir when he transfers to Walt Whitman. He's immediately popular but is used to coasting on his grades and now Helen is writing his papers. Mr. Dixon steps in to change things.
56	4	"Welcome Back, Miss Brown"	James Sheldon	Joanna Lee	October 8, 1971	F-204
Principal Kaufman rehires Diana Brown who is returning to teaching after a bitter divorce. The guys in her class feel she has it in for them and Pete Dixon tries to remedy the problem. Diana soon has a serious crush on her co-worker.
57	5	"Hi, Dad"	Charles Rondeau	Anthony Lawrence	October 15, 1971	F-205
Student Toby learns that he is adopted, upsetting him and leaving him with a desire to find his biological parents. Due to coincidence and wild speculation he decides Pete Dixon is his father. Pete must disillusion him.
58	6	"Suitable for Framing"	Lee Phillips	Bud Freeman, Gene Reynolds	October 22, 1971	F-206
Whitman High has a problem in Herbie, who's always looking to make a fast buck primarily by using shortcuts. When a fundraiser turns into disaster because of double ticketing, he's willing to let treasurer Bonnie take the blame.
59	7	"Hail and Farewell"	Ivan Dixon	Bill Manhoff	October 29, 1971	F-209
Principal Kaufman quits out of exhaustion and frustration with bureaucracy.
60	8	"Who's Benedict Arnold?"	Lee Philips	Phyllis & Robert White	November 5, 1971	F-208
Vice principal Casey seems to know who's responsible for misbehavior with Jason, Larry, and Bernie often in detention. A little detective work by the trio puts the focus on Victor and Jason wants to know why.
61	9	"Stay Awhile, Mr. Dream-Chaser"	William Wiard	S : Elisa A. Mayberry; S/T : Douglas Day Stewart	November 12, 1971	F-210
Raymond is a frequent and popular substitute at Whitman High with students responding to his entertaining teaching. He keeps students at a distance as he pursues other careers, disappointing Denny and angering Mr. Dixon.
62	10	"Dixon's Raiders"	William Wiard	Jerry Mayer	November 19, 1971	F-211
Mr. Dixon gives his students an assignment to evaluate the school's departments. Most turn out positive but Larry finds discrepancies in the cafteria budget putting popular dietician Miss Beemer in a tough spot.
63	11	"What Is a Man?"	Seymour Robbie	Dan Bulluck	December 3, 1971	F-213
Howard is a non-athletic student who is assigned a woman's part in a play by Miss Johnson. Some students start to bully him for being gay and his friend Bernie distances himself. Mr. Dixon and Miss McIntyre try to help the troubled teenager.
64	12	"The Sins of the Father"	Allen Baron	Roland Wolpert	December 10, 1971	F-212
Mr. Dixon is having his students participate in a mock trial and Val is excellent in his role as prosecutor. But when his father is in the headlines due to criminal charges Val becomes a target of derision by his classmates.
65	13	"They Love Me, They Love Me Not"	Unknown	Unknown	December 17, 1971	F-207
Alice Johnson is feeling teaching is glorified babysitting and wants to believe she's truly helping people. Pete connects her to a charity where she becomes overly involved in the problems of the Patterson family who start resenting her.
66	14	"The Fading of the Elegant Beast"	Unknown	Unknown	December 31, 1971	F-214
67	15	"House Made of Dark Mist"	James Shelton	William Bickley, Ivy Ruckman	January 7, 1972	F-216
Billie is a Native American student, new to Whitman High, befriended by Jason. Mr. Dixon's class is studying Indian treatment and Billie is sensitive to anything calling attention to his heritage, lashing out at classmates.
68	16	"Where Is It Written?"	Charles Rondeau	Joanna Lee	January 14, 1972	F-215
Liz McIntyre has two students needing guidance. Craig feels unable to live up to his family's academic achievements and become a minister while Judy acts out in anger over her home life. A chance meeting cutting class helps both of them. Guest Star: Aretha Franklin.
69	17	"And in This Corner..."	Charles Rondeau	Richard Bluel	January 21, 1972	F-218
Teacher, Pete Dixon, invites a young student (Champion) into the ring to test his boxing skills. If he can beat his teacher (Dixon), then he will drop out of school to pursue a boxing career.
70	18	"We Hold These Truths..."	Leslie H. Martinson	Joyce Perry, Stephen Kandel	January 28, 1972	F-219
Alice Johnson meets an older man who is a new American citizen and has firm ideas concerning the display of the US flag. When a student art exhibit uses the flag, he vandalizes it then tries to explain why.
71	19	"Suing Means Saying You're Sorry"	Richard Kinon	Milt Rosen	February 4, 1972	F-217
72	20	"I Gave My Love..."	Charles Rondeau	Joanna Lee	February 11, 1972	F-222
Veteran teacher Vivian Higgins answers student Joe Bob honestly when he has questions regarding sexually transmitted diseases. That angers his father and is against school policy which could cost Miss Higgins her job.
73	21	"The Witch of Whitman High"	Sid McCoy	Susana Silver, Joanna Lee	February 18, 1972	F-221
Andrea has moved around as a student and she immediately stands out at Whitman by claiming mystical powers. Her classmates are either intrigued or bothered and Miss Johnson tries to convince her that she doesn't need a gimmick.
74	22	"The Quitter"	Charles Perdeau	Douglas Day Stewart	February 25, 1972	F-223
Donnie is the outstanding swimmer at Whitman's but decides to quit because he wants time for other things. His father Sid reacts badly and blames Pete. Donnie joins too many groups and finds new pressures. Guest Star: Richard Hatch.
75	23	"There's No Fool Like..."	Charles Rondeau	Warren S. Murray	March 3, 1972	F-220
Pete is concerned about the number of students who smoke and decides to do something about it. He gets a clinic started to get the kids to kick the habit but none of them are interested in attending.

=== Season 4 (1972–73) ===
No. overall	No. in season	Title	Directed by	Written by	Original release date	Prod. code
76	1	"A Little Flyer on the Market"	Charles Rondeau	John McGreevey	September 15, 1972	J-101
A class lesson on the stock market inspires Miss Johnson and some students to invest so they can buy extra school equipment. But the fluctuations preoccupy them and Mr. Kaufman tells them to sell.
77	2	"I Wonder if January 15 Will Ever Come Again?"	Allen Baron	Gene Thompson	September 22, 1972	J-102
A series of thefts at school concerns the staff and Pete thinks he knows the culprit. Then they catch Jimmie red-handed and find his home life is the cause. Mr. Kaufman hopes to have a day that nothing occurs like on January 15th.
78	3	"Just Call Me Mr. Sahigmetsu"	Oscar Rudolph	Steven Kandel	September 29, 1972	J-103
A student is sold a defective motorcycle and the class decides to do something about it.
79	4	"And He's Not Even Lovable"	Allen Baron	Bernie Kahn	October 6, 1972	J-104
Tommy Burns and Jason are working on a school project but at Tommy's home, Jason is racially insulted by the father. Mr. Burns insists the boys not work together and Tommy learns it's time to stand up against his prejudiced dad.
80	5	"Hands Across the Sea"	Sid McCoy	Gene Thompson	October 13, 1972	J-105
Jason comes up with a fundraising idea but the arrival of Marshall, a polished student from England gets his classmates' attention. Marshall takes over the carnival project which Jason resents and he lashes out.
81	6	"The Impostor"	Herman Hoffman	T : Richard Bluel; S/T : Arnold Somkin	October 20, 1972	J-109
Mr. Kaufman puts a popular science teacher, Mr. Galvez, up for a different position and a background check reveals he has no degree. After resigning the Whitman students, led by Joe, try to get their favorite instructor his job back. Guest Star: Joe Santos.
82	7	"Lift, Thrust and Drag"	Richard Michaels	S : Lloyd Haynes; S/T : Leonard & Arlene Stadd	October 27, 1972	J-107
Pete Dixon teams with pilot Fred to help at-risk students but Principal Kaufman has his doubts. It particularly works for almost dropout Eddie who is angered when administrator Cramer has no funds available for its continuance.
83	8	"You Don't Know Me, He Said"	Seymour Robbie	Douglas Day Stewart	November 3, 1972	J-108
Student Carey Whittaker begins skipping class and behaving uncharacteristically and irresponsibly. Mr. Dixon ultimately finds out why - Carey has leukemia.
84	9	"Walt Whitman Goes Bananas"	James Sheldon	Martin Donovan	November 10, 1972	J-106
Herbie has come up with another scheme, this one involving jobs that is tied to eating a record number of bananas. Kaufman has his doubts but Miss McIntyre is encouraging. The media shows up turning it into an event.
85	10	"Bleep"	James Sheldon	S : Albert Ruben; S/T : John McGreevey	November 17, 1972	J-110
The students protest against a word being censored out of a fictional story written for the school newspaper.
86	11	"Shoestring Catch"	Sid McCoy	Bud Freeman	November 24, 1972	J-111
Otis is a new student at Whitman who has spent years in foster care and now lives with Mrs. Fowler. Miss Johnson learns he has a brilliant mind but reads at a 4th grade level. She tries to get him help to improve but he resists.
87	12	"Elizabeth Brown Is Failing"	Bill Bixby	Jerry Rannow & Greg Strangis	December 1, 1972	J-113
Beloved teacher Miss Brown is starting to decline mentally because of her age with faculty and students starting to notice. Mr Kaufman faces one of his toughest dilemmas in deciding what to do.
88	13	"Mr. Wrong"	Leslie H. Martinson	Martin Donovan	December 8, 1972	J-115
Frank is a new teacher at Whitman and takes an interest in Alice. She keeps accepting dates with him but finds him dull and doesn't know how to turn him down. Pete, thinking of a principal's job, learns about the paperwork involved. Guest Star: Bernie Kopel.
89	14	"The Nichols Girl"	Charles Rondeau	Martin Donovan	December 22, 1972	J-112
Stretch is hit by a basketball, breaking his braces, while looking at Phyllis Nichols who is cheerleading braless. The incident leads to an uproar over the school's lack of a dress code and student freedom. Guest Stars: Ed Begley Jr. and Angela Cartwright.
90	15	"Pardon Me, Your Apathy Is Showing"	Charles R. Rondeau	John McGreevy	January 5, 1973	J-114
Nick is a committed leftist and convinces Mr. Dixon to sponsor a Marx/Lenin club. Nick invites a confrontational speaker without authorization, upsetting board member Mr. Franklin and sparking a campus controversy.
91	16	"Rights of Others"	Harry Falk	Jerry Rannow & Greg Strangis	January 12, 1973	J-117
Students Gary and Joyce learn they are expecting a baby, upsetting Mr. Webster who planned a West Point career for his son. Joyce is 18, a legal adult, so she can make her choice without the father's input which upsets Gary. Guest Star: Dabney Coleman.
92	17	"Man, If You're So Smart..."	Allen Baron	Martin Donovan	January 19, 1973	J-118
Henry arrives at Whitman from the juvenile detention system. Told he has a fresh start he decides to act out, bragging about his incarceration and challenging teachers. Then Miss Johnson sees him with a gun and things turn dangerous.
93	18	"The Hand That Feeds"	James Sheldon	S : George Kirgo; S/T : Richard Bluel	February 2, 1973	J-119
Arthur is a smart young man but doesn't believe in competition so does just enough to get by. This frustrates Mr. Dixon so he's surprised when Arthur tries for a scholarship, wins, then turns it down to prove a point.
94	19	"Fifteen Years and What Do You Get?"	Charles R. Rondeau	Leonard & Arlene Stadd	February 9, 1973	J-120
Alice and the rest of the faculty plan a special party to celebrate Mr. Kaufman's fifteen years as principal at Whitman High. Wayne with a grudge against the administrator decides to ruin the surprise for him.
95	20	"Someone Special"	Leslie H. Martinson	Jerry Rannow & Greg Strangis	February 16, 1973	J-121
Tim Clemens is a child genius and is promoted to high school at twelve. Although he can compete academically, social situations are awkward especially after Tim asks the older Helen out on a date.
96	21	"A Hairy Escape"	Charles Rondeau	Martin Donovan	February 23, 1973	J-122
Jackie O'Farrell was a child star on TV which made him rich but it doesn't help him fit in at Whitman High. Jason and Bernie scheme to get Jackie to promote a concert but Jackie agrees only if they cut their hair.
97	22	"The Noon Goon"	Bill Bixby	Arnold & Lois Peyser	March 2, 1973	J-116
Criminal behavior is happening on school grounds so the students come up with their own policing plan. Headed by Richard the pass system soon falls apart due to rules enforcement and Miss Johnson's new car is vandalized. Directed by Bill Bixby.
98	23	"To Go with the Bubbles"	Herman Hoffman	Leonard & Arlene Stadd	March 9, 1973	J-123
Attractive Donna seems to find success easy with a screen test and fame before she graduates. Mr. Dragen finds himself envious as he has worked on a book for years and only gets rejection letters. Both learn from the other's experience. Guest Star: Audrey Landers.

=== Season 5 (1973–74) ===
No. overall	No. in season	Title	Directed by	Written by	Original release date	Prod. code
99	1	"I've Got the Hammer, if You've Got the Thumb"	Charles R. Rondeau	Stephen Kandel	September 14, 1973	K-301
Matt is a recent arrival from the mountains adjusting to city life. He gets the other students excited about fixing up a local park but ignores getting permits despite Pete Dixon's warning. The city must dismantle all the hard work. Note: Guest Star: Mark Hamill.
100	2	"Of Smoke-Filled Rooms"	James Sheldon	Richard Bluel	September 21, 1973	K-302
When a politician's actions anger the students they decide to get involved by running their own candidate, Gary Winters. Pete Dixon and Alice Johnson advise but the teens learn the details of a campaign with unexpected results.
101	3	"Can Nun Be Too Many?"	Herman Hoffman	Martin Donovan	September 28, 1973	K-303
Marie is a new teacher at Whitman and Mr. Kaufman develops a romantic interest in her. But after he learns she has recently left her vocation as a Catholic sister he has second thoughts.
102	4	"No Island Is an Island"	Sid McCoy	Leonard Stadd, Arlene Stadd	October 5, 1973	K-305
Tony is a recently arrived migrant from Mexico and has trouble fitting in at Walt Whitman. He needs help on several levels and doesn't realize Liz McIntyre plus the rest of the staff is there, ready to help.
103	5	"Twenty-Five Words or Less"	Richard Michaels	Leonard Stadd, Arlene Stadd	October 26, 1973	K-307
Herbie has contest fever and believes he can hit it big. He starts to annoy both staff and students with his constant pursuit of winning prizes over anything else going on.
104	6	"Pete's Protege"	Herman Hoffman	Martin Donovan	November 2, 1973	K-308
Pete Dixon's student teacher wonders when he will get the chance to be in front of the classroom. When Pete has the flu, he gets his chance.
105	7	"Love is a Many Splintered Thing"	James Sheldon	Martin Donovan	November 9, 1973	K-309
Tracy Rice is a student in Miss Johnson's creative writing class and Alice asks her author father Jim for advice. The two develop an interest in each other making Tracy jealous and she spreads a nasty rumor that threatens the teacher's job.
106	8	"Pi in the Sky"	Herman Hoffman	Leonard Stadd, Arlene Stadd	November 16, 1973	K-311
Budget cutbacks see the removal of typewriters, uniforms, and even a refrigerator at Whitman. Liz McIntyre is trying to help math genius Toby get into Stanford but he decides to hack the computer to get back the school supplies.
107	9	"Mismatch Maker"	James Sheldon	Leonard Stadd, Arlene Stadd	November 30, 1973	K-313
Alice encourages Woody in writing poetry over the objections of his businessman dad because there's no money in it. Alice connects Woody with musician Melinda and they sell a song but that doesn't make Woody or his father happy.
108	10	"Here's to the Boy Most Likely"	Leslie H. Martinson	Jerry Rannow, Greg Strangis	December 7, 1973	K-312
Chuck is an overachiever at Whitman and looking forward to receiving a scholarship Mr. Kaufman hands out. But he handles the stress by drinking excessively and Pete Dixon tries to help him see that's a losing situation.
109	11	"El Greco to Jason"	Herman Hoffman	Martin Donovan	December 21, 1973	K-314
Amy broke up with her jock boyfriend Les and turns her attention to Jason who responds by drawing portraits of her. Miss Johnson hopes he will enter an art competition and continue his education but Jason is thinking about marriage.
110	12	"MPG"	Charles R. Rondeau	Leonard Stadd, Arlene Stadd	December 28, 1973	K-310
Jason, Bernie, and other classmates are getting a car ready for a competition between high schools. Transfer students Henry and Marvin want to enter a different vehicle so Pete Dixon intervenes leading to an unusual race.
111	13	"I Didn't Raise My Girl to Be a Soldier"	Charles R. Rondeau	S : Tony Palmeiro; T : Leonard Stadd, Arlene Stadd	January 4, 1974	K-306
Cathy wants to be a doctor but needs an ROTC scholarship to go to college. Both the commander and her father object leading Liz to argue for women's rights. Cathy responds to family pressure by running away with her boyfriend Cliff.
112	14	"Cry, Uncle"	Richard Michaels	Martin Donovan	January 11, 1974	K-315
Principal Kaufman's nephew Mickey begins attending Whitman telling everyone who his uncle is against advice. Mickey aspires to be a comedian but tells terrible jokes. Even so, he's chosen to MC a talent show but then gets stage fright.
113	15	"Jason and Big Mo"	Allen Baron	Richard Bluel	N/A	K-304
Elmo Thomas looks to have a promising future as a baseball player but starts ignoring his friends and studies. Mr. Dixon tries to advise him while Jason seeks guidance from Miss McIntyre about his future. A knee injury threatens Elmo's career. Note: Guest Star: Michael Warren. Note: this episode never aired.
