= J. Alan Thomas =

American film and television actor

- Thomas in Taxi, 1982
- Born: Jeffrey Alan Thomas; May 8, 1950; Cleveland, Ohio, U.S.
- Died: April 15, 2007 (aged 56); Los Angeles, California, U.S.
- Occupations: Film and television actor

Jeffrey Alan Thomas (May 8, 1950 – April 15, 2007) was an American film and television actor. He was best known for playing the recurring role of Jeff Bennett, the Sunshine Cab's assistant dispatcher in the American sitcom television series Taxi.

Thomas attended Youngstown State University, but dropped out in his junior year. He guest-starred in television programs including Room 222, Starsky & Hutch, Police Woman, Cannon and Cheers. He also appeared in films such as Throw Momma from the Train and Man on the Moon. Aside from acting, he was a musician and a singer.

Thomas died on April 15, 2007, in Los Angeles, California, at the age of 56.
