= Room 222 =

American comedy TV series

- Genre: Comedy drama
- Created by: James L. Brooks
- Starring: Lloyd Haynes; Denise Nicholas; Michael Constantine; Karen Valentine
- Theme music composer: Jerry Goldsmith
- Country of origin: United States
- Original language: English
- No. of seasons: 5
- No. of episodes: 113 (1 unaired) (list of episodes)

Production
- Executive producer: Gene Reynolds
- Camera setup: Single-camera
- Running time: 26 minutes
- Production companies: Gene Reynolds Productions; 20th Century Fox Television

Original release
- Network: ABC
- Release: September 17, 1969 – January 11, 1974

Room 222 is an American comedy-drama television series created by James L. Brooks and produced by 20th Century Fox Television that originally aired on ABC from September 17, 1969, to January 11, 1974, for 112 episodes (plus one that never aired). The show's ensemble cast, starring Lloyd Haynes, Denise Nicholas, Michael Constantine, and Karen Valentine, is centered around the American history class in Room 222 at a fictional racially-integrated high school in Los Angeles. It was one of the first half-hour American TV shows that dealt with serious contemporary social issues.

In 1970, Room 222 earned the Primetime Emmy Award for Outstanding New Series, while Constantine and Valentine won for Outstanding Supporting Actor in a Comedy Series and Outstanding Supporting Actress in a Comedy Series, respectively.

== Plot ==
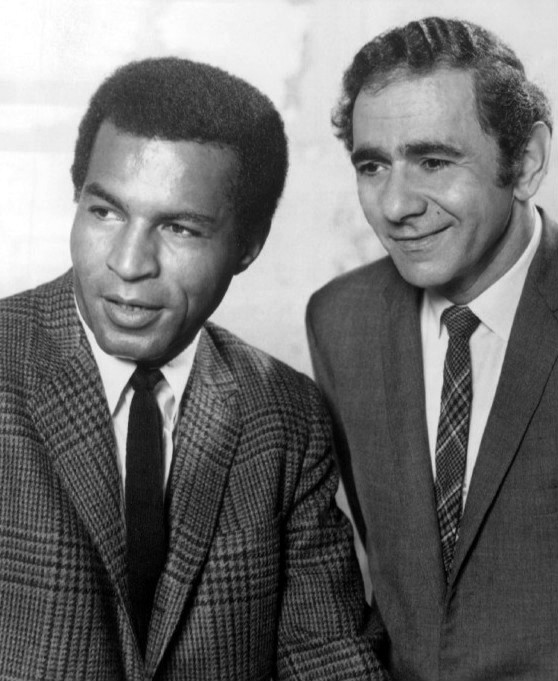
Haynes and Constantine in 1969.

Although the series primarily focuses on an American history class in Room 222 at the fictional Walt Whitman High School, in Los Angeles, California, it also depicts other events in and outside the school, such as the home lives of the racially diverse student body and faculty.

The history class is taught by Pete Dixon (Lloyd Haynes), an idealistic African American teacher. Other characters featured in the show include the school's compassionate guidance counselor, Liz McIntyre (Denise Nicholas), who is also Pete's girlfriend; the dryly humorous school principal, Seymour Kaufman (Michael Constantine); the petite and enthusiastic Alice Johnson (Karen Valentine), who is initially a student teacher, later full-time teacher whom Pete mentors; and Principal Kaufman's secretary, Miss Hogarth, played by Patsy Garrett. Also, many recurring students are featured from episode to episode.

Pete Dixon delivers gentle lessons in tolerance and understanding to his students, and they admire his wisdom, insight, and easygoing manner. The themes of the episodes are sometimes topical, reflecting the contemporary political climate of the late 1960s and early-to-mid 1970s, such as the Vietnam War, women's rights, race relations, and Watergate. However, most plots are timeless and feature themes still common to modern-day teenagers. For example, the 1969 episode "Funny Boy" deals with a class clown who is self-conscious about being overweight. In the 1971 episode "What Is a Man?", a student is a mistaken victim of anti-gay harassment, while the 1974 episode "I Didn't Raise My Girl to Be a Soldier" delves into parent–teenage child issues.

== Cast ==
=== Main cast ===
- Lloyd Haynes as Mr. Pete Dixon, the protagonist, teaches 11th grade American History in room 222 of Walt Whitman High School
- Denise Nicholas as Miss Liz McIntyre, guidance counselor at Whitman, dating Pete
- Michael Constantine as Mr. Seymour Kaufman, the principal of Whitman, preoccupied with his duties but dryly humorous
- Karen Valentine as Miss Alice Johnson, a student teacher learning from Pete

=== Recurring cast ===
- Jan Shutan as Bonnie, (8 episodes, 1969–1970)
- Heshimu Cumbuka (as Heshimu) as Jason Allen, the "tough guy" of the class (89 episodes, 1969–1974)
- David Jolliffe as Bernie, the school basketball star (83 episodes, 1969–1974)
- Judy Strangis as Helen Loomis, the "quiet kid" of the class (70 episodes, 1969–1974)
- Howard Rice as Richie Lane, the "brainy" kid in the class (35 episodes, 1969–1971)
- Ta-Tanisha as Pam, the "popular girl" of the class (31 episodes, 1969–1972)
- Eric Laneuville as Larry (29 episodes, 1970–1974)
- Ivor Francis as Mr. Kenneth Dragen (16 episodes, 1969–1974)
- Patsy Garrett as Miss Hogarth (12 episodes, 1969–1973)
- Robert Casper as Mr. Wisegarten, Mr Girard (12 episodes, 1969–1973)
- Ty Henderson as Cleon (8 episodes, 1972–1974)
- Ramon Bieri as Mr. Gil Casey, vice principal (4 episodes, 1969–1970)
- Helen Kleeb as Miss Tandy (4 episodes, 1969–1971)
- Bruno Kirby as Herbie Considine (3 episodes, 1971–1973)
- Eve McVeagh as Madge Morano, Mrs Cates, PTA Member (2 episodes, 1969, 1971)

=== Guest stars ===
Notable guest stars during the series five-season run include Larry Linville, Cindy Williams, Chuck Norris, Nancy Wilson, DeForest Kelley, Rob Reiner, Richard Dreyfuss, Burgess Meredith, Kurt Russell, Aretha Franklin, Bernie Kopell, Mako, Don Most, Angela Cartwright, Ed Begley Jr., J. Alan Thomas, Dabney Coleman and Mark Hamill.

== Episodes ==
Season	Episodes	Originally released		Rank	Rating
Season	Episodes	First released	Last released	Rank	Rating
1	26	September 17, 1969	March 18, 1970	35	19.4
2	26	September 23, 1970	April 7, 1971	—N/a	—N/a
3	23	September 17, 1971	March 3, 1972	28	19.8 (Note: Tied with Cannon)
4	23	September 15, 1972	March 9, 1973	42	18.4
5	15 (Note: The fifteenth produced episode of the fifth season never aired.)	September 14, 1973	January 11, 1974	67	13.8

== Production ==
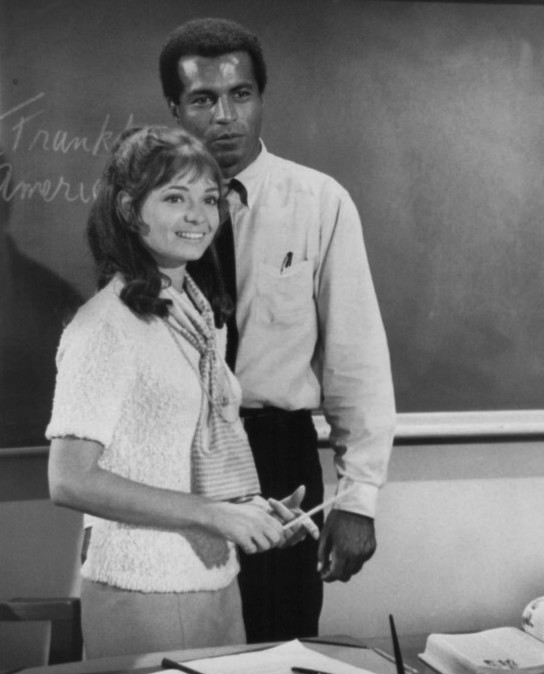
Valentine with Haynes in 1970

The program was filmed at 20th Century Fox studios. Exterior shots of Los Angeles High School, pre-1971 earthquake, were shown in the opening credits, and some outdoor scenes in the early seasons.

The show draws some comparisons to a theatrical movie which premiered during the show's first season, Halls of Anger. In that movie, a new, black teacher joins a southern California high school; an attractive, sympathetic black female member of staff shows romantic interest; a militant black student is frequently involved in situations; issues of racism and integration are featured. The film and television show also share actors (Ta-Tanisha, Helen Kleeb, Rob Reiner). However, while Room 222 is a comedy drama, milder in tone, Halls of Anger is purposefully aggressive, using deliberately controversial language and some forceful violence to highlight the real and dangerous potential of unresolved racial conflict.

== Reception ==
Room 222's initial episodes garnered weak ratings, and ABC was poised to cancel the program after one season. However, the show earned several nominations at the 1970 Emmy Awards, and ABC relented. In the spring of 1970, Room 222 won Emmy Awards for Best New Series; Best Supporting Actor (Michael Constantine); and Best Supporting Actress (Karen Valentine). The following year, Constantine and Valentine were again nominated in the supporting acting awards category.

After the shaky first season, Room 222 received respectable ratings during its next three years. Ratings peaked during the 1971–72 season, during which it held a #28 viewership ranking. By the start of the 1973–74 season, ratings had fallen drastically, and ABC canceled the show at mid-season. After the series ended, the program entered syndication and was rerun on several television stations throughout the United States.

== Legacy ==
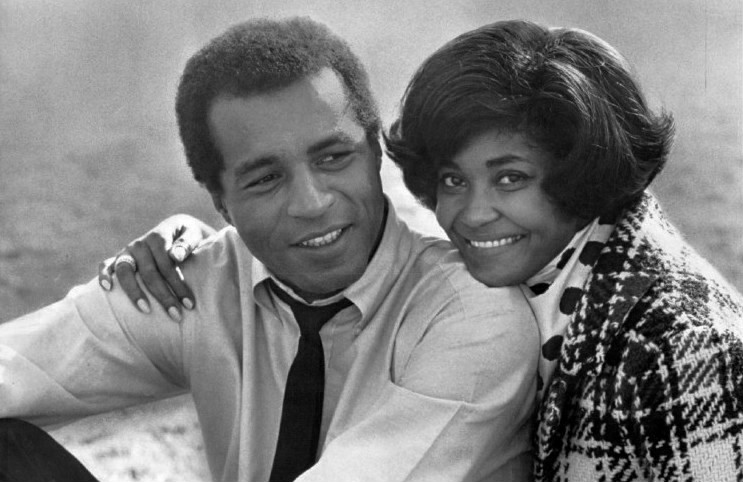
Haynes with guest star Nancy Wilson (1970)

The Television Academy Foundation has credited Room 222 for not only in the way it portrayed a racially integrated classroom and revolved around "a dedicated and student-friendly African-American history teacher," but also for predating Norman Lear's 1970s sitcoms when it came to invoking serious social issues, stating that "A season and a half before Norman Lear made "relevant" programming a dominant genre with the introduction of programs like All in the Family and Maude, Room 222 was using the form of the half-hour comedy to discuss serious contemporary issues. During its five seasons on the air, the show included episodes that dealt with such topics as racism, sexism, homophobia, dropping out of school, shoplifting, drug use among both teachers and students, illiteracy, cops in school, guns in school, Vietnam war veterans, venereal disease, and teenage pregnancy". According to the Television Academy Foundation, "the show broke new narrative ground that would later be developed by the major sitcom factories of the 1970s, Grant Tinker's MTM Enterprises and Norman Lear's Tandem Productions."

== Music ==
The theme song was written by composer Jerry Goldsmith, written primarily with a 7/4 time signature. His theme and two episode scores for the series ("Richie's Story" (the pilot) and "The Flu") were later issued by Film Score Monthly on an album with his score for the film Ace Eli and Rodger of the Skies.

== Books and comics ==
A series of novels based on characters and dialog of the series was written by William Johnston and published by Tempo Books in the early 1970s. Dell Comics published a comic book for four issues during 1970 and 1971.

== Home media and rights ==
In 2009 and 2010, Shout! Factory sublicensed the home videos rights from Fox, releasing the first two seasons of the show on DVD in Region 1. As of 2022, these releases have been discontinued and are out of print. It is unknown if the remaining three seasons will be released. In 2019, Rupert Murdoch sold most of 21st Century Fox's film and television assets to Disney, and Room 222 was included in the deal.

DVD name	Ep #	Release date
Season One	26	March 24, 2009
Season Two	26	January 19, 2010

== See also ==
- White savior § Appearance in television
