= Star Fairies =

- Genre: Animation; Drama; Adventure
- Written by: Mark Seidenberg; Rich Fogel
- Directed by: Ray Patterson
- Voices of: Drew Barrymore; Billy Barty; Michael Bell; Holly Berger; Susan Blu; Didi Conn; Jonathan Winters; Frank Welker; Jean Kasem; Howard Morris; Noelle North; Arte Johnson; Ta-Tanisha; B. J. Ward; Jerry Houser; Matthew Gotlieb; Don Messick; Michael Nouri; Shavar Ross
- Music by: Hoyt Curtin
- Country of origin: United States
- Original language: English

Production
- Executive producers: William Hanna; Joseph Barbera
- Producer: Mitch Schauer
- Production company: Hanna-Barbera Productions

Original release
- Network: Syndication
- Release: October 26, 1985

Star Fairies is a doll toy series of the 1980s made by the Tonka company. The dolls had different costumes and personalities. Star Fairies was adapted into a televised special, made by Hanna-Barbera in 1985. Family Home Entertainment released the special on VHS in 1986.

== Television film ==
The film is about a princess Star Fairy named Sparkle (B. J. Ward) who lives up in the clouds in Castle WishStar. Sparkle's job is to grant wishes to children who wish upon a star, but lately she has been overwhelmed by the increasing number of wishes being made. She asks for help from the Wishing Well (Jonathan Winters), who instructs her to go to Mount Wishmore and wish on a shooting star. She does so and receives five new star fairy helpers named: True Love (Jean Casem), Whisper (Noelle North), Jazz (Susan Blu), Spice (Didi Conn), and Nightsong (Ta-Tanisha). As the story goes on, the fairies meet a little girl named Hillary (Drew Barrymore), who is upset but cannot think of a wish to make her happy. Hillary and other Star Fairies then seek help from Princess Sparkle. When Hillary and the Star Fairies return to Castle WishStar, they discover Princess Sparkle's Wand has been stolen by a group of short, hairy elves, and their leader, Bungle Boss, who have also made off with the Wishing Well. This sends them on a journey to recover the wand.

== Star Fairy dolls ==
In the early 1980s Tonka manufactured a line of dolls called the Star Fairies which consisted of six dolls. All dolls were marked on the back of their heads Hornby (c) 1983. They stood about 6 1/2" tall. They had swivel heads, fully moveable arms/legs with a twist waist, and the legs were also bendable. They had pointed elfish ears and pixie faces. Each fairy came with her own purple brush, a silver star wand and a white base, so each could stand upright. The wings were made of a fabric and placed over a flexible plastic white cut-out frame.

Princess Sparkle was a blonde with blue eyes. She wore a pale pink gown, silver crown and had pale pink wings.

Whisper had dark brown hair with brown eyes. She wore a lavender gown and had matching lavender wings.

Spice had dark red hair with green eyes. She wore a short golden yellow dress and had dark yellow wings.

True Love had light brown hair with brown eyes. She wore a short white dress with magenta and pale blue wings.

Night Song had straight dark brown hair with brown eyes and a brown flesh tone. She wore a pale blue and white dress with matching blue wings.

Jazz had straight blonde hair with blue eyes. She had a pink and wine outfit with harem-like sheer pants with matching wine and pink wings.

A special deluxe edition Royal Princess Sparkle was made too. She had special holographic wings encased in plastic and came with a special star wand that would allow to see multi-rainbow colors trapped in her wings. This version of the Princess Sparkle had a more elaborately designed outfit in purple, white and silver. Her crown also was different from the one on the standard version doll. She also came with a brush and white base.

Some of the other accessories that came with these dolls were:

Lavender the Magical Unicorn was a lavender colored unicorn/pegasus with a silky white hair mane/tail and a pearly spiral horn. Like the fairies she had clip-on pale pink and lavender wings which attached to a bar located on her sides. Underneath the bar was a small protrusion so that a Star Fairy Coach could also be attached to her body so that she could whisk the fairies away to the clouds and the land of WishComeTrue. Lavender came with her own hair brush too, but she was not marked. Some of the coaches had a number imprinted on the inside (but not all of them), and the coach was a pale pink with a lavender interior and wheels and was highlighted with silver accents. Lavender was sold and packaged in two versions, by herself as well as paired with the coach.

There were also the Star Fairies Animal Friends, the three animals that were made of a soft PVC and covered with a soft flocking. They were especially designed so that the Star Fairies could sit on them. The most unusual feature was their eyes, which had white "stars" on them. They were given special powers and helped the fairies with their wishful tasks:

Dipper is the playful little gray kitten with blue eyes.

Lady is the young light gray swan with gray eyes.

Jitter is the shy light beige baby bunny with orange-brown eyes.

There was a play center called Castle Wish Star where the fairies lived and played together. Embedded in the clouds, this celestial lavender castle had a white stairway leading to two doors. On the inside was a special cloud sleeping chamber, a throne for the Princess, a cloud bathtub complete with a privacy door, and a place to hang the fairies' extra clothing. There was a spinning May-Pole with purple ribbons, upon which three dolls could be placed and spun.

There was also Wish Keeper Jewel Box, a pink box which opened and had a chair for a Fairy doll to sit in and look in the vanity mirror. There were drawers where accessories could be kept (or little girls' treasures). It had a small closet so that clothing and wings could be stored too.

The Star Fairies had six different fashion outfits which included a pair of color coordinating wings to match their new outfit: Moonlight Lilac Ball Gown, Pink Clouds Night Gown, Golden Glow Evening Gown, Star Shower Rain Cape & Pants, Emerald Sky Dancin' Dress and Red Twilight Party Dress.
