= The Loners (1972 film) =

- Directed by: Sutton Roley
- Written by: John Lawrence
- Produced by: Jerry Katzman
- Starring: Dean Stockwell; Pat Stich; Todd Susman; Scott Brady; Gloria Grahame
- Cinematography: Irving Lippman
- Edited by: John B. Woelz
- Music by: Fred Karger
- Production companies: Four Leaf Productions; Cinemobile Systems
- Distributed by: The Fanfare Corporation
- Release date: April 1972
- Country: United States
- Language: English

The Loners is a 1972 American film starring Dean Stockwell and Gloria Grahame. It was the final film produced by Sam Katzman, who died the following year.

== Plot ==
Police chase a man who accidentally killed a cop.

== Cast ==
- Dean Stockwell as Stein
- Scott Brady as Hearn
- Patricia Stich as Annabelle "Julio" Carter Jr.
- Todd Susman as Alan
- Gloria Grahame as Annabelle Carter
- Hal Jon Norman as Father

== Production ==
The film was based on an original story by John Lawrence called Julio and Stein. In August 1968 Julia London was going to star.

In September 1970 Sam Katzman announced he would executive produce with Jerry to produce. By October the film had been renamed The Runners and Dean Stockwell and Scott Brady were signed to star. The film was also called Police Trap.

The script was rewritten by Barry Sandler whose work at been admired by the company who made the movie. Filming took place in Albuquerque, New Mexico starting September 22, 1970. "I stayed in that production all the way through," recalled Sandler. "I went down to the location with them in Albuquerque, New Mexico. It was great. You had Dean Stockwell, who was the star, and Gloria Grahame, the academy award winner. It was just very exciting. I was, like, 19 or 20 or whatever, and to be working on a movie with these stars for the first time while I was still in school was a real thrill."

Dean Stockwell later called the film "a mess. Another maniac director. Sutton Roley. Totally crazy."

== Reception ==
The Los Angeles Times called the film "a fast-moving, action-filled embarrassment. A styleless, focusless, violence worshiping embarrassment."
