= Griff (TV series) =

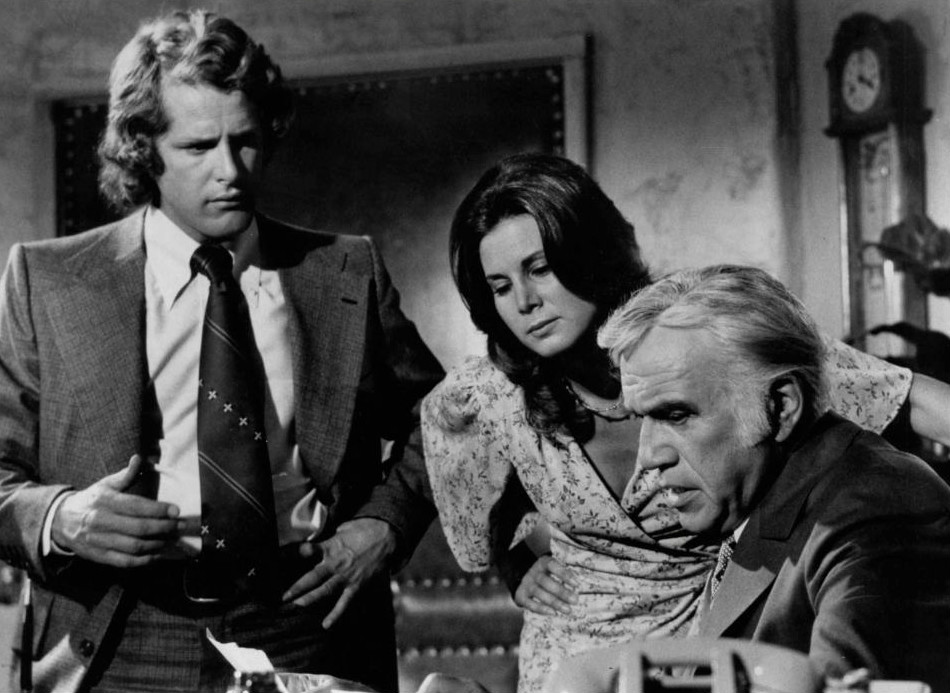
- Ben Murphy, Patricia Stich and Lorne Greene
- Genre: Crime drama
- Created by: Larry Cohen
- Starring: Lorne Greene; Ben Murphy; Vic Tayback; Patricia Stich
- Country of origin: United States
- Original language: English
- No. of seasons: 1
- No. of episodes: 13

Production
- Executive producers: Steven Bochco; David Victor; Peter S. Fischer; Robert F. O'Neill
- Camera setup: Single-camera
- Running time: 48 mins.
- Production companies: Groverton Productions; Universal Television

Original release
- Network: ABC
- Release: September 29, 1973 – January 4, 1974

Griff is an American crime drama starring Lorne Greene and Ben Murphy, which aired on ABC from September 29, 1973, to January 4, 1974.

== Synopsis ==
Lorne Greene portrayed Wade "Griff" Griffin, a former police officer who becomes a private detective. Ben Murphy plays Greene's 31-year-old partner, S. Michael "Mike" Murdock. Vic Tayback portrays Captain Barney Marcus of the Los Angeles Police Department, Griff's continuing contact with the police. Patricia Stich appeared as Gracie Newcombe, the secretary for the two detectives.

The two-hour pilot movie, titled Man on the Outside, did not air until June 25, 1975, almost a year and a half after the cancellation of the series. Ben Murphy does not appear in the pilot, which has a plot identical to the plot of the pilot for Barnaby Jones. Wade Griffin's son is murdered, and Griff goes after the man who killed him.

The Case of the Baltimore Girls is a TV movie compiled from two episodes, "The Last Ballad" (November 10, 1973) and "All the Lonely People" (October 13, 1973), and features Kim Hunter, Patricia Crowley, Lawrence Pressman, Dabney Coleman, William Windom, and Herbert Rudley.

Death Follows a Psycho is another TV movie compiled from two episodes, "Countdown to Terror" (November 17, 1973) & "Elephant in a Cage" (November 24, 1973).

== Guest stars ==
- Christopher Connelly
- Barbara Feldon
- Norman Fell
- Susan Howard
- Warren Stevens
- Sal Mineo
- Ricardo Montalbán
- Nick Nolte
- Ben Piazza
- Inga Swenson

== Production notes ==
The series was executive produced by Steven Bochco, David Victor, Peter S. Fischer and Robert F. O'Neill.

Griff was filmed by Groverton Productions at Universal City Studios in Los Angeles. The series followed the ABC Suspense Movie at the 10 p.m. Eastern timeslot on Saturdays opposite CBS's The Carol Burnett Show and the NBC Saturday Night at the Movies.

== Episodes ==
Episode #	Title	Plot/Notes	Original air date
1	"The Framing of Billy the Kid"	Griff and Mike investigate the case of a pro football player who's accused of killing a drug dealer. He claims he's been framed, though he has a previous arrest for marijuana possession on his record.	September 29, 1973
2	"Death by Prescription"	A woman (Barbara Feldon) is accused of killing her husband, a renowned heart surgeon, on his cabin cruiser after an all-night party. Griff tries to prove that the man died after going into a diabetic coma.	October 6, 1973
3	"All the Lonely People"	The murder of a girl whose date was arranged by a computer dating service is investigated.	October 13, 1973
4	"Don't Call Us, We'll Call You"	The search is on to discover the identity of the mentally ill person who's terrorizing Griff and Mike's secretary, Gracie.	October 20, 1973
5	"Prey"	A Middle Eastern leader, Gamal Zaki (Sal Mineo), visits Los Angeles but is being stalked by a would-be assassin who's a master of disguises.	October 27, 1973
6	"The Last Ballad"	Griff investigates the death of a rock singer who underwent a legal abortion performed by his friend, Dr. Martha Reid.	November 10, 1973
7	"Countdown to Terror"	A bank robber (Ricardo Montalbán) with a bomb attached to him takes four people hostage and holds them in a bank vault, with Griff called into negotiate for their release.	November 17, 1973
8	"Elephant in a Cage"	A veteran police officer is charged with murder, but as Griff gets closer to the truth, the guilty party is planning on killing him under the guise of an accident.	November 24, 1973
9	"Her Name Was Nancy"	Griff and Mike investigate the claims of Mike's friend, a former prisoner of war, who claims that someone is trying to kill him.	December 8, 1973
10	"Hammerlock"	The daughter of ex-convict Jeff Harker contacts Griff about her father, who's being pressured to take part in a bank robbery, with the criminals threatening his daughter's life.	December 15, 1973
11	"Isolate and Destroy"	An armed, unknown assailant begins his plan to kill Griff by shooting two of his friends.	December 22, 1973
12	"Fugitive from Fear"	Griff tries to help a frightened youngster locate his father, an ex-convict from Louisiana, who's afraid he'll die if he's returned to prison.	January 5, 1974
