= List of The New Dick Van Dyke Show episodes =

This is a list of episodes for the CBS television series The New Dick Van Dyke Show. All episodes were filmed in color.

== Series overview ==
Season	Episodes	Originally released	
Season	Episodes	First released	Last released
1	24	September 18, 1971	March 4, 1972
2	24	September 17, 1972	March 25, 1973
3	24	September 10, 1973	March 11, 1974

== Episodes ==
=== Season 1 (1971–72) ===
No. overall	No. in season	Title	Directed by	Written by	Original release date
1	1	"Smoke Rings"	Carl Reiner	Carl Reiner	September 18, 1971
Dick demonstrates how to blow smoke rings to a chimpanzee who is appearing on his talk show. Unfortunately, Dick becomes (re-)addicted to smoking.
2	2	"A Star Ain't Born"	Marc Breaux	Gordon Farr & Arnold Kane	September 25, 1971
Goodbye Phoenix, hello Hollywood... maybe... but only if Dick can have a successful screen test with a glamorous leading lady.
3	3	"Mid-term Dinner"	Carl Reiner	George Arthur Bloom	October 2, 1971
Reminiscent of Guess Who's Coming to Dinner, the Prestons get a big surprise when Lucas' girlfriend shows up to dinner, and just happens to be black. The most surprised is Dick's mom, known for her bigotry.
4	4	"Everything from A to Z"	Jay Sandrich	Bernie Orenstein & Saul Turteltaub	October 9, 1971
Annie unknowingly takes a dirty book with her to school, thus giving a whole new meaning to sex education.
5	5	"The Tennis Pro"	John Rich	Bernie Orenstein & Saul Turteltaub	October 16, 1971
Jenny takes tennis lessons, and Dick becomes green with jealousy.
6	6	"A House Is Not a Home, Yet"	John Rich	Warren S. Murray & Ed Scharlach	October 23, 1971
When the house of their dreams becomes available, the Prestons decide to move. Problems arise as they try to sell their old house and Annie decides she doesn't want to leave.
7	7	"The Replacement"	Carl Reiner	Bernie Orenstein & Saul Turteltaub	October 30, 1971
Dick gains a sidekick on his talk show. Soon, he begins to fear that the popular (and egotistical) singer will steal his job.
8	8	"Queasy Rider"	George Tyne	Bernie Orenstein & Saul Turteltaub	November 6, 1971
Dick buys a motorcycle and, against advice from everyone, takes it out to the desert on a ride. When he runs out of gas and takes refuge in an old cabin, things take a turn for the worse.
9	9	"The Storm"	Carl Reiner	Carl Reiner	November 13, 1971
A storm descends on the Prestons' household, and they find themselves re-enacting Noah's Ark.
10	10	"The Conductor and the Lady"	Stan Harris	Bernie Orenstein & Saul Turteltaub	November 20, 1971
When symphony conductor Paul Franz is a guest on Dick's talk show, Dick asks him on the air to come to their house for dinner, throwing Jenny into a panic and Dick into the dog house.
11	11	"Off and Running"	Carl Reiner	Carl Reiner	November 27, 1971
In the pilot for the series, Dick and Jenny Preston have been married for 18 years and are the proud parents of two children, 10 and 16. With Dick's talk show doing well, they feel that their life is next to perfect, until unexpected news arrives: Jenny is pregnant.
12	12	"Room with a View"	Carl Reiner	Bernie Orenstein & Saul Turteltaub	December 4, 1971
A misunderstanding causes Jenny to think Dick is building her a sewing room instead of the sauna he's planning on.
13	13	"Linda, Linda, Linda"	Jay Sandrich	Gordon Farr & Arnold Kane	December 11, 1971
An ever-helpful Dick promises a young starlet a world record. To Jenny's dismay, the record is for the longest TV kiss.
14	14	"Pepito of Mexico"	Carl Reiner	Carl Reiner	December 18, 1971
Someone's playing Robin Hood with the Prestons' items. Unfortunately, it seems to be an inside job.
15	15	"Bernie Did It"	Marc Breaux	Steve Prisker	January 1, 1972
After fighting with his business manager, Dick must negotiate his own contract with the station manager.
16	16	"Annie Get Your Bike"	Marc Breaux	Tom Patchett & Jay Tarses	January 8, 1972
This flashback episode focuses on the calamities that ensue when Jenny goes into labor. Also, Annie feels ignored because of the baby's arrival; and Lucas falls off his new bike, breaking his nose.
17	17	"What Is Your Husband Doing Tomorrow?"	Alan Rafkin	Martin A. Ragaway	January 15, 1972
Jenny becomes suspicious when Dick keeps missing dinner. Is he seeing gorgeous models for business or pleasure?
18	18	"The Birth"	Stan Harris	Bernie Orenstein & Saul Turteltaub	January 22, 1972
The alternative title to this episode could have been: Jenny and the Unmarried Hitchhiker. Dick must deal with them both on the way to the hospital for the birth of the Prestons' third child.
19	19	"The Split"	Marc Breaux	Bernie Orenstein & Saul Turteltaub	January 29, 1972
Dick plays marriage counselor when Bernie and Carol split up over the issue of having children.
20	20	"The Harry Award"	Jay Sandrich	Bernie Orenstein & Saul Turteltaub	February 5, 1972
Dick is being honored with an award; unfortunately, the ceremony is being held at a restricted golf club.
21	21	"People's Choice"	Marc Breaux	Laurence Marks	February 12, 1972
Jenny and Dick find themselves on opposite ends of the school board election.
22	22	"After the Ball Is Over"	Jay Sandrich	Steve Pritzker	February 19, 1972
Mike's ex-husband returns and the chase in on. Is he really reformed?
23	23	"Running Bear and Moskowitz"	George Tyne	Bill Persky & Sam Denoff	February 26, 1972
When Jenny and Carol go into business together, their husbands warn them that friends should not share a business. For once, maybe their husbands are correct.
24	24	"The Telethon"	Marc Breaux	Bernie Orenstein & Saul Turteltaub	March 4, 1972
When the talent for the television station's telethon doesn't show up, it's up to Dick and the gang to carry it off.

=== Season 2 (1972–73) ===
No. overall	No. in season	Title	Directed by	Written by	Original release date
25	1	"The Former Mr. Preston"	Bill Persky	Saul Turteltaub & Bernie Orenstein	September 17, 1972
A guest on Dick's talk show claims to be Jenny's first husband.
26	2	"The Needle"	Peter Baldwin	Elias Davis & David Pollock	September 24, 1972
In a flashback episode, Dick and Jenny recall the hotel they spent the night in on the way to an important wedding, and the needle Dick got stuck in his leg.
27	3	"The Great Prestoni"	George Tyne	Elias Davis & David Pollock	October 1, 1972
The office is robbed after hours and Dick must make a daring escape from the crooks — with hilarious results.
28	4	"Sobriety Test"	Bill Persky	Martin Cohan	October 8, 1972
Dick agrees to a drinking test for his show, to show the evils of drinking. But while under the influence, he says a few things about marriage that Jenny does not find funny. The comedic theme of this episode echoed Dick Van Dyke's real-life alcoholism, about which he later said that even his children did not know at the time.
29	5	"Bernie's House"	Jay Sandrich	Saul Turteltaub & Bernie Orenstein	October 15, 1972
When the house next to the Prestons' comes up for sale, it's hard for them to admit they don't want Bernie and Carol to buy it.
30	6	"Headaches"	Jay Sandrich	Elias Davis & David Pollock	October 22, 1972
Dick's persistent headaches lead him to seek psychiatric help.
31	7	"The Game"	Lee Philips	Bob Howard	November 5, 1972
Bernie comes up with a game show he is sure will be a winner for the network, if he can only sell the idea.
32	8	"Who Do You Want to Be?"	Carl Reiner	Carl Reiner	November 12, 1972
An episode of Dick's show requires the gang to pretend to be people from history: Dick as Mark Twain and Fred Astaire, Jenny as Lena Horne, Carol as Barbra Streisand and Mike as Ladybird Johnson.
33	9	"Chef Mike"	Harvey Korman	Saul Turteltaub & Bernie Orenstein	November 19, 1972
Mike is given her own cooking show, but she only knows how to cook one thing.
34	10	"Ashes and Urns"	Peter Baldwin	Elias Davis & David Pollock	November 26, 1972
Dick's mother brings her father's ashes over to the house so they can scatter them according to his wishes, but somehow during the night the ashes disappear.
35	11	"Old Dick and Jenny"	Lee Philips	Warren S. Murray & Ed Scharlach	December 3, 1972
A sexy new divorced neighbor among other things make Dick and Jenny each wonder if the other one still sees them as attractive.
36	12	"Big Time Baby"	Harvey Korman	Warren S. Murray	December 10, 1972
A network exec drops some hints that Dick's show may be moving to New York.
37	13	"Blood Is Thicker Than Oatmeal"	Carl Reiner	Bernie Orenstein & Saul Turteltaub	December 17, 1972
Annie gets a part in a commercial opposite Dick.
38	14	"The Jailbird"	George Tyne	Elias Davis & David Pollock	December 24, 1972
On his way home Christmas Day, Dick gets caught speeding and doesn't have enough money to get out of jail. When he calls Bernie to bail him out, he too gets a ticket and Christmas doesn't look very merry.
39	15	"Dick and the Baby"	Norman S. Powell	Saul Turteltaub & Bernie Orenstein	January 7, 1973
Dick is left in charge of the baby when Jenny and Annie head out of town, but it seems he mislaid Chrissy at the grocery store.
40	16	"My Friend, the Public Enemy: Part 1"	George Tyne	Saul Turteltaub & Bernie Orenstein	January 14, 1973
The Prestons' new neighbors are fast becoming great friends and even allow Dick to buy stock in their tool company. But when it becomes known to Dick that the company is a mafia front, things get a little scary.
41	17	"My Friend, the Public Enemy: Part 2"	George Tyne	Saul Turteltaub & Bernie Orenstein	January 21, 1973
Hoping they've sent the children away to a safe place, Dick and Jenny try to figure out how save themselves from the mafia.
42	18	"Pot Luck"	Jerry Paris	Gordon Farr & Arnold Kane	January 28, 1973
Dick's mother mistakes marijuana cigarettes for her legal ones.
43	19	"The 10th Honeymoon"	Lee Philips	Carl Reiner	February 4, 1973
Every time Dick and Jenny try to take a second honeymoon, Dick suffers some kind of injury and they can't go. So when he pulls a muscle right before they are leaving for a week in paradise, he decides not to tell Jenny.
44	20	"Will Baby Make Three?"	Bill Persky	Elias Davis & David Pollock	February 18, 1973
Carol and Bernie want to adopt a baby, but Carol gets more than a little nervous and accidentally gets a little tipsy.
45	21	"The Power of the Bleep"	Lee Philips	Michael Elias, Arnie Kogen	February 25, 1973
When Dick's show is censored, he walks off of the set. Will Jenny be able to stand having him at home?
46	22	"You Gotta Have Class"	George Tyne	Susan Silver	March 4, 1973
Mike falls for her creative writing teacher, not knowing he's already married.
47	23	"Big Brother Is Watching You"	Jay Sandrich	Bernie Orenstein & Saul Turteltaub	March 18, 1973
When Dick's brother arrives with a new lady, Bernie recognizes her as a nude dancer.
48	24	"Guess Who's Coming to Seder"	George Tyne	Elias Davis & David Pollock	March 25, 1973
Carol, a Catholic, has to pretend to be Jewish so that Bernie's mother won't be upset.

=== Season 3 (1973–74) ===
No. overall	No. in season	Title	Directed by	Written by	Original release date
49	1	"Those Who Care"	Alan Rafkin	Carl Reiner, Elias Davis, Michael Elias, and David Pollock	September 10, 1973
When Dick gets offered a part on a popular soap opera, the Prestons leave their home in Arizona for California.
50	2	"Dennis Takes a Wife"	Noam Pitlik	Carl Reiner and Michael Elias	September 17, 1973
A neurotic script writer falls for the Prestons' houseguest.
51	3	"One of the Boys"	Norman S. Powell	Jeff Harris & Bernie Kukoff	September 24, 1973
Dick has all of his friends over for a poker game but, as the host, he's torn between the game and the baby.
52	4	"Dick in Deutsch"	George Tyne	Elias Davis & David Pollock	October 1, 1973
When Dick and Jenny win a trip to Germany, things go from bad to worse when a mix up in rooms almost get Dick arrested for immoral behavior.
53	5	"Mrs. Ferguson"	Jerry Paris	Steve Gordon	October 8, 1973
One of Dick's fans confuses TV with reality and begins to think that he is a real doctor and will only allow him to care for her.
54	6	"I'll Cry Today"	Jay Sandrich	Elias Davis & David Pollock	October 15, 1973
Dick goes to the dentist, but the laughing gas has some unusual effects.
55	7	"The Young Surgeons"	Bill Persky	Elias Davis & David Pollock	October 22, 1973
This flashback episode has Dick describing his first acting job to his co-workers.
56	8	"She Kisses Like a Dead Mackerel"	George Tyne	Pamela Chais	October 29, 1973
A cold, wet, drunk and very jealous Jenny makes an unseemly comment about Dick's co-star that gets picked up by the press.
57	9	"Preston Al Naturale"	Jerry Paris	Elias Davis & David Pollock	November 12, 1973
An Italian director thinks Dick would be perfect for his new movie, but Dick isn't so sure when he discovers he'll have to do a nude scene with a sexy Italian actress.
58	10	"Turning Pro"	Alan Rafkin	Richard Baer	November 19, 1973
Lucas visits his parents and has some interesting plans. He's leaving school to become a professional bowler.
59	11	"Exit Laughing"	Norman S. Powell	Elias Davis & David Pollock	November 26, 1973
Dick's Uncle Jackie comes for a visit and ends up dying, which sets off a family battle over how the funeral should be conducted.
60	12	"What Your Best Friend Doesn't Know"	Jerry Paris	Elias Davis & David Pollack	December 3, 1973
Dick's old friend can't memorize his lines.
61	13	"Mr. Dazzle"	Jerry Paris	Elias Davis & David Pollack	December 17, 1973
Dick has a chance to do a commercial that pays well and could lead to other jobs, but it's a cheesy ad for a toilet bowl cleaner.
62	14	"He Who Steals My Friends"	Alan Rafkin	Elias Davis & David Pollock	December 31, 1973
Richard and Connie introduce Dick and Jenny to friends of theirs, and the two couples hit it off so well the Richardsons begin to feel jealous.
63	15	"The Back Break Kid"	Noam Pitlik	Dennis Klein	January 7, 1974
An eager actor puts Dick in a back brace while they're rehearsing. Will the young stud take over Dick's job while he recovers?
64	16	"Balzac, Come Home"	Noam Pitlik	Ronny Pearlman	January 14, 1974
The Prestons babysit, then lose, Margot's spoiled dog.
65	17	"The Hickey"	Carl Reiner	Mark Elias, Carl Reiner & Frank Shaw	January 21, 1974
An ambitious young actress gives Dick something more than he bargained for — a hickey.
66	18	"House Guests"	Alan Rafkin	Elias Davis & David Pollock	January 28, 1974
Company comes and stays and stays and stays, and tempers start to fly.
67	19	"The Pregnancy"	Noam Pitlik	Mark Elias, Carl Reiner & Frank Shaw	February 11, 1974
When Jenny thinks she might be pregnant, Dick has a dream that he and the guys at work are the ones expecting.
68	20	"Man of Medicine"	Noam Pitlik	Steve Gordon	February 18, 1974
Dick quits his job when a producer promises him the lead in a show that hasn't sold yet.
69	21	"Commercial Housewives"	Peter Baldwin	Dick Clair & Jenna McMahon	February 25, 1974
Jenny gets a chance to do a commercial, but it doesn't go over well.
70	22	"A Fake Matisse Is Better Than a Real Anzelowitz"	Jerry Paris	Carl Reiner & Michael Elias	March 4, 1974
Jenny buys a painting for $75 that she is convinced is a Matisse, but the art dealer appears to be dragging his feet on the decision.
71	23	"We Met at Mama Lombardi's"	Bud Molin	Mark Elias, Carl Reiner & Frank Shaw	March 11, 1974
This flashback episode tells the story of how Dick and Jenny met and how they almost ended up hating one another.
72	24	"Lt. Preston of the 4th Cavalry"	Jerry Paris	Sybil Adelman & Barbara Gallagher	N/A
Annie accidentally walks in on her parents while they are making love.
