= Lloyd Haynes =

American actor (1934–1986)

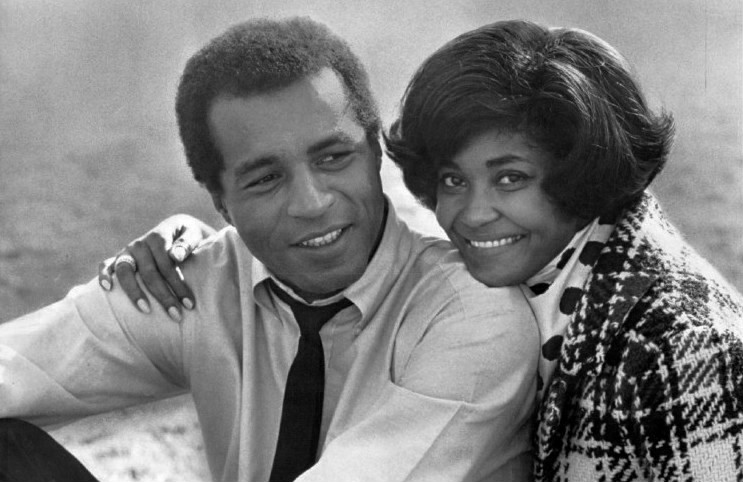
- Haynes with singer Nancy Wilson on TV's Room 222 (1970)
- Born: Samuel Lloyd Haynes; October 19, 1934; South Bend, Indiana, U.S.
- Died: December 31, 1986 (aged 52); Coronado, California, U.S.
- Resting place: Eternal Hills Memorial Park; Oceanside, California
- Education: San Jose State University
- Occupations: Actor, U.S. Marine, writer
- Years active: 1966–1986
- Known for: Role of Pete Dixon in Room 222
- Spouse(s): Elizabeth Ellis (1959–1970); Saundra Burge (1971–1973); Carolyn Ingis (1981–1986; his death)
- Children: 1
- Military career
- Allegiance: United States
- Branch: U.S. Marine Corps; U.S. Naval Reserve
- Service years: 1952–1964 (Marines)
- Rank: Commander (USNR)
- Conflicts: Korean War; Vietnam War

Samuel Lloyd Haynes (October 19, 1934 – December 31, 1986) was an American actor, best known for his starring role in the television series Room 222.

== Biography ==
Haynes, a native of South Bend, Indiana, was the son of Laquetta née Thompson Haynes and Alfred L. Haynes. Haynes served in the U.S. Marines from 1952 to 1964 and during the Korean War. He was a public affairs officer for the Naval Reserve with the rank of Commander and an alumnus of San Jose State University.

Following his military career, Haynes studied acting at the Film Industries Workshop and Actors West in Los Angeles. His film career included roles in Madigan (1968), Ice Station Zebra (1968), Assault on the Wayne (1971), Look What's Happened to Rosemary's Baby (1976), The Greatest (1977), and Good Guys Wear Black (1978). He also appeared in a number of television series, such as Batman and the miniseries 79 Park Avenue (1977). He played Communications Officer Alden in the second Star Trek pilot episode "Where No Man Has Gone Before" (1965), but was replaced by Nichelle Nichols as Lt. Uhura when the series went into production the following year.

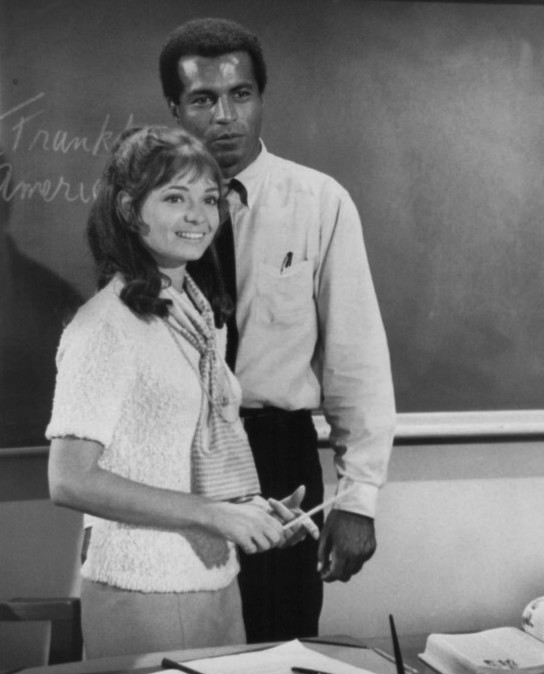
Haynes with Karen Valentine in Room 222 (1970)

Haynes also appeared on television shows such as Hotel, The Green Hornet, The Fugitive, The F.B.I., Marcus Welby, M.D., and Emergency!, as Captain Stone of Los Angeles County Fire Station 8 in the fourth episode of its fifth season (1975–1976) called "Equipment".

He was best known as high school history teacher Pete Dixon in the comedy-drama series Room 222, with Denise Nicholas, Michael Constantine, and Karen Valentine. Haynes and Valentine were both nominated for an Emmy and Golden Globe Award for their roles. Set at fictional Walt Whitman High School in a diverse area of Los Angeles, the show ran for five seasons on ABC, from 1969 to 1974, and was partially filmed at Los Angeles High School.

== Death ==
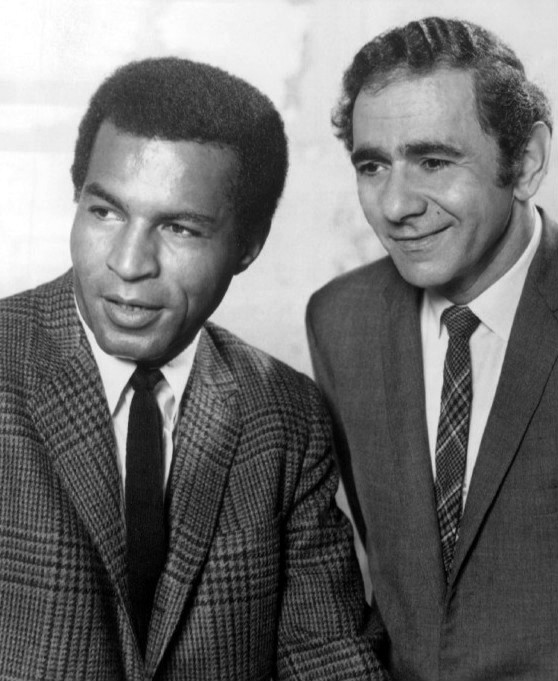
Lloyd Haynes and Michael Constantine in Room 222 (1969)

Haynes died of lung cancer at age 52 in Coronado, California. He was survived by his third wife, Carolyn Inglis, and their 4-year-old daughter, Jessica Haynes. His Room 222 co-star, Denise Nicholas, attended Haynes' small, private funeral in San Diego County. During his illness, Haynes was co-starring in the television soap opera General Hospital as Mayor Ken Morgan and was commuting from Coronado to Hollywood for filming, as he was working up until the time of his death. He was buried at Eternal Hills Memorial Park in Oceanside, California.

== Personal life ==
Haynes was an accomplished light airplane pilot, and developed a program to encourage and train minorities in aviation.

In 1970, after the first season of Room 222, Haynes divorced his wife of eleven years, Elizabeth. He married his second wife, Saundra Burge, the same year; they divorced in 1973. Haynes married again in March 1981, to Carolyn Inglis; together they had a daughter, Jessica Haynes.

== Filmography ==
Year	Title	Role	Notes
1968	Madigan	Sam Woodley	
1968	Ice Station Zebra	Webson	
1969	The Mad Room	Dr. Marion Kincaid	
1971	Assault on the Wayne	Lieutenant Dave Burston	
1976	Look What's Happened to Rosemary's Baby	Laykin	
1977	The Greatest	Herbert Muhammad	
1978	Good Guys Wear Black	Murray Saunders	

== Television ==
Year	Title	Role	Notes
1966	The F.B.I.	First Special Agent	Episode: The Spy-Master
1966	Star Trek: The Original Series	Alden	S1:E3, "Where No Man Has Gone Before"
1967	Batman	Lord Chancellor	Episode: King Tut's Coup; Episode: Batman's Waterloo
1967	The Green Hornet	Military Policeman	Episode: Invasion from Outer Space: Part 1 Episode: Invasion from Outer Space: Part 2
1966–1967	The Fugitive	Officer Ed Warren / Officer / Detective Franks	Episode: Wife Killer; Episode: A Clean and Quiet Town; Episode: The Judgement: Part 1
1969–1974	Room 222	Pete Dixon	113 episodes
1975	Emergency!	Captain Stone	Episode: Equipment
1981	Dynasty	Judge Horatio Quinlan	Episode: Blake Goes to Jail; Episode: The Testimony; Episode: Enter Alexis; Episode: The Verdict
1983	Simon & Simon	Track Coach	Episode: Psyched Out
1983	Hart to Hart	Lieutenant Croyden	Episode: Love Game
1983	T.J. Hooker	Lew Jensen	Episode: Matter of Passion
1984	Hotel	Victor Fielding	Episode: Lifelines

== Awards and nominations ==
Year	Association	Category	Production	Result
1970	Emmy Awards	Outstanding Continued Performance by an Actor in a Leading Role in a Comedy Series	as Pete Dixon in Room 222	Nominated
1970	Golden Globe Awards	Best TV Actor - Drama	as Pete Dixon in Room 222	Nominated
2006	TV Land Awards	Teacher of the Year	Room 222	Nominated
