= Larry Merchant =

American sportswriter and commentator (born 1931)

- Born: Larry Kaufman; February 11, 1931 (age 95); Brooklyn, New York U.S.
- Occupations: Television journalist Boxing commentator
- Notable credit: HBO World Championship Boxing commentator (1978–2012)
- Spouse: Patricia Stich
- Children: Two daughters, three step-sons

Larry Merchant (born Larry Kaufman; February 11, 1931) is an American sportswriter, a longtime commentator for HBO Sports presentations of HBO World Championship Boxing, Boxing After Dark and HBO pay-per-view telecasts, called "the greatest television boxing analyst of all time" by some, including ESPN Boxing analyst Dan Rafael. In 2026, he was honored with The Ring magazine's Lifetime Achievement Award.

== Early life and education ==
Merchant was born in the New York City borough of Brooklyn on February 11, 1931, to Ukrainian-Jewish immigrants. After graduating from the University of Oklahoma, Merchant was interested in entering professional sports broadcasting. However, due to the fear of antisemitism within the industry possibly halting any chances he had of succeeding, Merchant changed his legal surname "Kaufman" to its literal translation "Merchant". In 1978, Merchant joined HBO Sports as an analyst. Prior to joining HBO Sports, Merchant was a well-regarded sports columnist with the Philadelphia Daily News and the New York Post.

== Career ==
Merchant was part of the HBO Boxing commentary team along with Barry Tompkins, Jim Lampley, Max Kellerman, Gil Clancy, Sugar Ray Leonard, George Foreman, Roy Jones Jr., Emanuel Steward, Lennox Lewis and Harold Lederman for championship and pay-per-view fights.

Among the fighters who have clashed with Merchant include Mike Tyson, Bernard Hopkins, Oscar De La Hoya and Floyd Mayweather Jr.. The De La Hoya incident came during his fight with Pernell Whitaker. When De la Hoya entered the ring to Mariachi music, Merchant stated that while he loved Mariachi music, he felt that it "stunk" in this particular situation. Merchant would later apologize on the air after De La Hoya tried to have him removed from HBO.

Merchant is well known for his post fight interviews which feature his hard-hitting, blunt questions and confrontational interview style. These have drawn both praise and ire in the past. Fans have claimed them to be candid and honest while detractors consider them to be purposely biased or agitating and insensitive at times. An example of this occurred when Vernon Forrest won a controversial decision in 2006 over Ike Quartey. When Forrest thanked those close to him, Merchant quipped, "Would you also like to thank the judges?"

In 1985, Merchant received the Sam Taub Award for Boxing Broadcast Journalism presented by the Boxing Writers Association of America. He is also the author of three books.

In October 2002, he was inducted into the World Boxing Hall of Fame in Los Angeles. He was inducted into the International Boxing Hall of Fame in 2009.

On January 23, 2009, HBO picked up Merchant's two-year option at the end of his 2007 contract. Merchant continued to alternate "World Championship Boxing" telecasts and HBO PPV cards with Kellerman.

Among the many people that Merchant interviewed during his tenure as sportscaster on HBO Boxing was the future President of the United States Donald Trump before the fight between Mike Tyson and Michael Spinks in 1988, and former South African President Nelson Mandela, the latter during a side-trip to Mozambique off an HBO Boxing program of the first Lennox Lewis-Hasim Rahman contest, which was held in South Africa in 2001.

== Health ==
Merchant was hospitalized in critical condition in Los Angeles, California, following a medical emergency on December 21, 2023.

== Criticism ==
In September 2011, following the controversial ending to the fight between Floyd Mayweather Jr. and Victor Ortiz, Mayweather angrily called for Merchant to be fired. After Merchant pressured Mayweather to respond to fans who thought that he had taken advantage of Ortiz's apology (resulting in his win by knockout), Mayweather grew irritated by Merchant's questioning and interrupted Merchant by saying "You never give me a fair shake...They can put somebody else up here to give me an interview. HBO need to fire you. You don't know shit about boxing. You ain't shit... All of these boxing experts—how can you be a boxing expert if you never had a fight before?" Floyd Mayweather Jr.'s outburst led to Merchant responding: "I wish I was 50 years younger and I would kick your ass." Later, Mayweather defended his outburst by saying that "Everybody is tired of Larry Merchant." During Merchant's interview immediately following the bout between Floyd Mayweather Jr. and Miguel Cotto, Merchant acknowledged that Mayweather had apologized the night before the bout and he had accepted the apology.

8 years prior his feud with Mayweather, Merchant also engaged in a controversial exchange with Hall of Fame boxer Bernard Hopkins after his win over Morrade Hakkar on HBO, declaring that Hopkins was paid for doing little to no work. With his daughter in his arms, Hopkins replied, "Let me tell you something Larry, you get paid everyday on TV for not doing much."

Dana White drew allegories between MMA commentator staff and stated negative opinions on Merchant.

It was announced by HBO on December 13, 2012, that Larry Merchant would retire from broadcasting after the December 15, 2012 telecast of HBO's World Championship Boxing from Houston, Texas after 35 years of being a boxing commentator on HBO.

Since leaving HBO, Merchant has provided commentary for the international English language feed of some Top Rank promoted boxing shows.

== Writing ==
- The National Football Lottery (1973)
