= Blood money =

Blood money may refer to:

- Blood money (restitution), money paid to the family of a murder victim
- A stream of revenue used by boarding masters for placing many seamen on ships
- Money obtained from crime, especially at the cost of another's life

== Films ==
- Blood Money (1917 film), a film starring Harry Carey
- Blood Money (1921 film), a British-Dutch film
- Blood Money (1933 film), a film starring George Bancroft
- Blood Money (1957 film), a made for TV drama directed by Ralph Nelson
- Blood Money (1974 film) or The Stranger and the Gunfighter, a kung fu Spaghetti Western
- Khoon Ki Keemat (lit. 'Blood Money'), a 1974 Indian Hindi-language film
- Blood Money (1980 film), a film starring Bryan Brown
- Blood Money (1983 film), a film starring Chow Yun-fat
- Blood Money (1988 film), an alternate title for Clinton and Nadine
- Khoon Ka Karz (transl. Blood Money), a 1991 Indian Hindi-language film
- Blood Money (1996 film), a film starring Traci Lords
- Blood Money (1997 film), a Nigerian film directed by Chico Ejiro
- Blood Money (1999 film), original title for The Arrangement (1999 Film), a film written and directed by, and starring Michael Ironside
- Blood Money (2000 film), directed by Aaron Lipstadt, starring Brian Bloom and Jenya Lano
- Blood Money (2008 film) or Fist of the Warrior, an American martial arts/crime film
- Blood Money (2012 film), an Indian Hindi-language film starring Kunal Khemu and Amrita Puri
- Blood Money (2012 Australian film), an Australian film directed by Gregory McQualter
- Blood Money (2016 film), directed by Luke White, starring Klariza Clayton, Ollie Barbieri and Scott Chambers
- Blood Money (2016 short film), directed by Jamil Dehlavi
- Blood Money (2017 film), directed by Lucky McKee and starring John Cusack
- Blood Money (2021 film), an Indian Tamil-language film directed by Sarjun KM

== Music ==
- Blood Money (Lord Infamous album), 2009
- Blood Money (Mobb Deep album), 2006
- Blood Money (Tom Waits album), 2002
- "Bloodmoney", a song by Poppy
- Blood Money, an album by Lil' O
- "Blood Money", a song by Darlia
- "Blood Money", a song by Eyehategod from Confederacy of Ruined Lives
- "Blood Money", a song by Jon Bon Jovi from Blaze of Glory
- "Blood Money", a song by DJ Khaled fromWe Global
- "Blood Money", a song by Overkill from Horrorscope
- "Blood Money", a song by The Sisters of Mercy, a non-album B-side from First and Last and Always
- "Blood Money", a song by Zion I from Chapter 4
- "Damned for All Time"/"Blood Money", a song from the rock opera Jesus Christ Superstar
- "Blood Money", a song by The Church from the album Starfish
- "Blood Money", a song by April Wine from the album Power Play

== Television ==
- Blood Money (TV series), a 1981 British television series
- "Blood Money" (Angel), a 2001 episode
- "Blood Money" (Breaking Bad), a 2013 episode
- "Blood Money" (Forever Knight), a 1995 episode
- "Blood Money" (Law & Order), a 1999 episode
- "Blood Money" (Line of Duty), a 2014 episode
- "Blood Money" (Taggart), a 2002 episode

== Video games ==
- Blood Money (video game), a 1989 Amiga computer game
- Hitman: Blood Money, a 2006 video game by IO Interactive
