= Dead money =

Dead money may refer to:

- Dead money (poker), a poker term
- Global saving glut, a situation in which desired saving exceeds desired investment
- Dead Money (expansion pack), a downloadable content pack for the video game Fallout: New Vegas
- Dead Money (film), a 2024 American thriller film starring Emile Hirsch
