= The National Football Lottery =

Book by Larry Merchant

- Author: Larry Merchant
- Language: English
- Subject: Sportswriting
- Publisher: Holt, Rinehart and Winston
- Publication date: 1973
- Publication place: United States
- Pages: 325
- ISBN: 978-0-030-10736-8

The National Football Lottery is a 1973 book by sportswriter Larry Merchant. In this book, Merchant attempts to discover what would happen if he were to bet on National Football League games for an entire season. He is given $30,000 by his publisher to do so.

The book was written in 1973, and the season in question is the 1972 NFL season, special in which the 1972 Miami Dolphins were the only team in NFL history to go undefeated and untied with an unblemished 17-0 mark. At this time in some states, including New York, where Merchant lives, have a ban on gambling, which is also discussed some in the book. In the end, after his ups and downs, Merchant comes out up over $17,000. This is very good considering he bet fewer than $1,000 on most games.

== Reception ==
Kirkus Reviews said The National Football Lottery would be a reference book that NFL Commissioner Pete Rozelle would consult.
