= The New Dick Van Dyke Show =

Television series

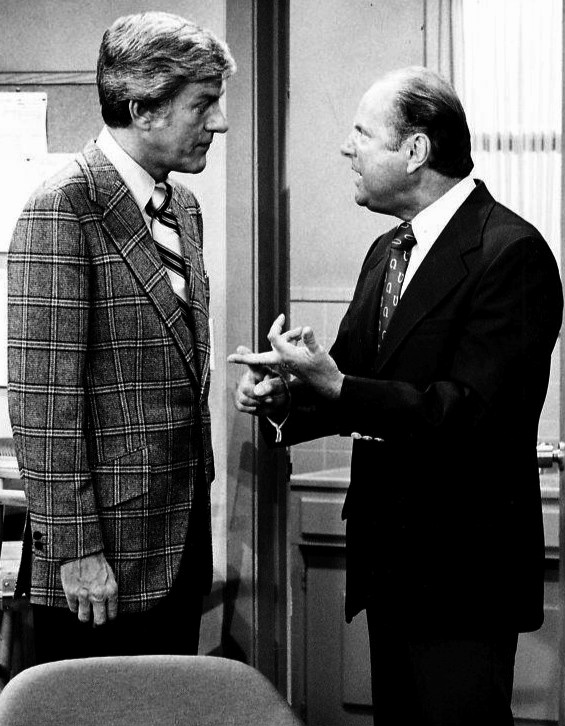
- Van Dyke as Dick Preston and Dick Van Patten as Max Mathias, 1973.
- Created by: Carl Reiner
- Starring: Dick Van Dyke; Hope Lange; Fannie Flagg; Nancy Dussault; David Doyle; Dick Van Patten; Barry Gordon; Henry Darrow; Richard Dawson; Chita Rivera; Barbara Rush
- Composers: Jack Elliott; Allyn Ferguson
- Country of origin: United States
- Original language: English
- No. of seasons: 3
- No. of episodes: 72 (list of episodes)

Production
- Running time: 30 minutes per episode
- Production company: Cave Creek Enterprises

Original release
- Network: CBS
- Release: September 18, 1971 – March 18, 1974

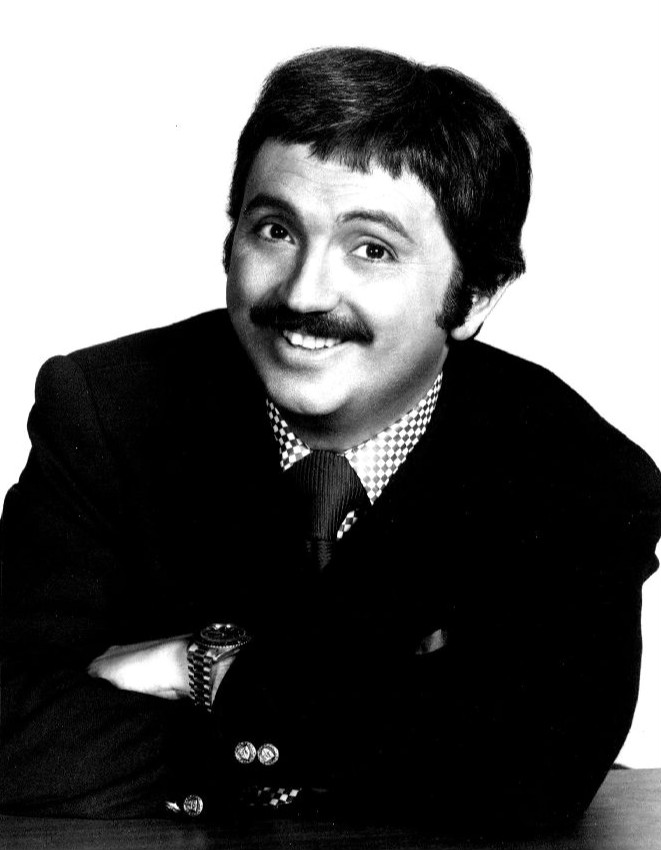
Marty Brill

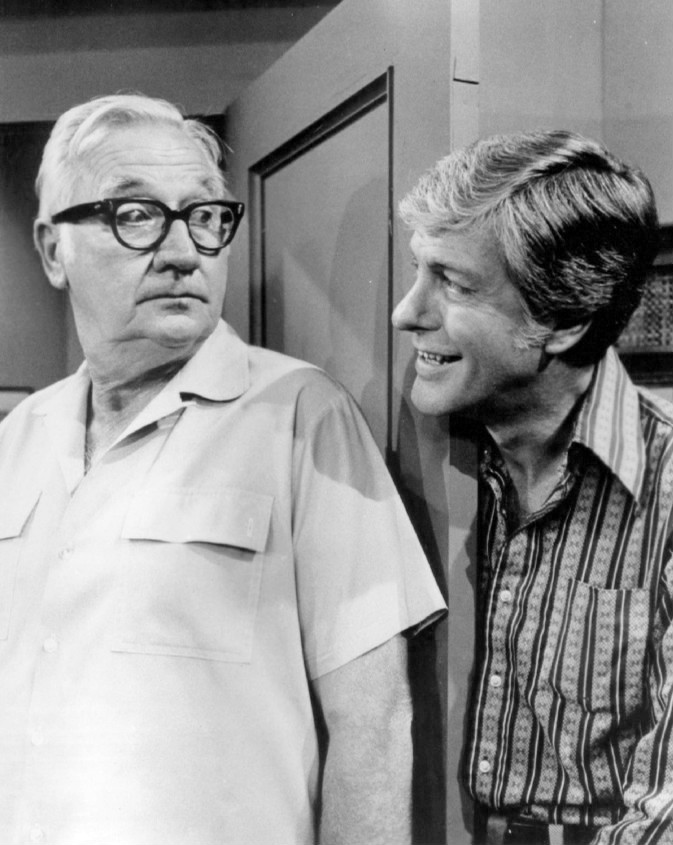
Guest star Edward Andrews and Dick Van Dyke (1973)

The New Dick Van Dyke Show is an American sitcom starring Dick Van Dyke created by Carl Reiner that aired on CBS from 1971 to 1974. It was Van Dyke's first return to series television since The Dick Van Dyke Show.

== Background ==
CBS was so eager to have Dick Van Dyke return to their network that they signed him to a three-year contract. Van Dyke was living in Cave Creek, Arizona, at the time and did not want to move back to Hollywood, so the network agreed to film the show at Southwestern Studio on Stage 1 in nearby Carefree, Arizona. The Dick Van Dyke Show creator Carl Reiner is credited as creator of the new series, wrote and directed numerous episodes, and also served as creative consultant.

== Premise ==
Van Dyke starred as Dick Preston, a local television talk show host at KXIV-TV in Phoenix, Arizona (the KXIV call sign actually belonged to a Phoenix radio station that Van Dyke co-owned). Like Van Dyke's previous series, this show divided its time between Dick's job in television and his home life with his wife and child. The show featured Hope Lange as his wife, Jenny; Arizona native Angela Powell as their daughter, Annie; Fannie Flagg as his sister, Mike; David Doyle as his boss, Ted; and Marty Brill and Nancy Dussault as the Prestons' friends, Bernie and Carol Davis. The Prestons also had a son, Lucas (played by Michael Shea seasons 1–2; Wendell Burton season 3), who was away at college and seen occasionally. Jenny also gave birth to another son, Chrissy, during season 1.

== Cast ==
- Dick Van Dyke as Dick Preston
- Hope Lange as Jenny Preston
- Angela Powell as Annie Preston
- Marty Brill as Bernie Davis (seasons 1-2)
- Fannie Flagg as Mike Preston (seasons 1-2)
- Nancy Dussault as Carol Davis (seasons 1-2)
- Dick Van Patten as Max Mathias (season 3)
- Barry Gordon as Dennis Whitehead (season 3)

== Episodes ==
Season	Episodes	Originally released	
Season	Episodes	First released	Last released
1	24	September 18, 1971	March 4, 1972
2	24	September 17, 1972	March 25, 1973
3	24	September 10, 1973	March 11, 1974

== Broadcast history and Nielsen ratings ==
Season	Time slot (ET)	Rank	Rating
1971–72	Saturday at 9:00 pm	18	22.2
1972–73	Sunday at 9:00 pm Sunday at 7:30 pm	55	15.6
1973–74	Monday at 9:30 pm	41	18.4

The show's Nielsen ratings were good during the first season. The show had a timeslot in CBS's highly rated Saturday night lineup which included All in the Family, Funny Face and The Mary Tyler Moore Show, which starred Van Dyke's former co-star. The ratings, however, were much lower than the shows surrounding it. In its second season, the show was moved to the network's low-rated Sunday night lineup and the ratings plummeted. CBS wanted to cancel the show but they had Van Dyke under a three-year contract, so the network decided to retool the show.

== The final season ==
For the third season, the setting and production of the show moved to Hollywood. Dick and his family moved there after he landed a role in a medical soap opera called Those Who Care in which he played Dr. Brad Fairmont. With the exception of Van Dyke, Lange and Powell, none of the other original cast members appeared in season 3. New cast members included Dick Van Patten as the show's producer, Barry Gordon as the show's writer, Henry Darrow as the stage manager, Barbara Rush as the show's star, and Richard Dawson and Chita Rivera as the Prestons' neighbors. In the fall of 1973, the beginning of its third year, CBS gave the series another time slot, this time on Monday nights at 9:30 P.M. immediately following Here's Lucy starring Lucille Ball. The network felt that Ball's series would provide a strong lead-in for The New Dick Van Dyke Show.

An episode produced for the third season, "Lt. Preston of the 4th Cavalry," included an off-camera scene in which Annie, Dick and Jenny's daughter, walked in on her parents having sex. CBS refused to air the episode, claiming it was incompatible with Van Dyke's family-friendly image. This so incensed Carl Reiner that he refused to continue on the show beyond the third season, citing the network's hypocrisy. CBS at this time was allowing a number of other shows, such as All in the Family, which featured Reiner's son, Rob, to deal openly with much more controversial topics. Reiner promised never to work in television, particularly CBS, again. (Note: In 1976, Reiner returned as star of the popular but short-lived ABC sitcom, Good Heavens; in 1981, Reiner appeared in an episode of CBS's Walt Disney and the CBS TV-movie drama, Skokie.)

Although the show's ratings improved, Van Dyke did not enjoy working away from his home and did not want to continue the show without Reiner. After the third season, he chose not to renew his contract and moved back to Arizona, prompting the cancellation of the show.

== Syndication ==
The show was rarely run in syndication, though various local stations aired it occasionally in the 1970s. In the early 1990s, reruns aired briefly on TNT. In 2002, the Christmas episode "The Jailbird" aired as part of TV Land's traditional classic Christmas show marathon. In 2004, the show aired on GoodLife TV Network. The reruns included the previously unaired episode "Lt. Preston of the 4th Cavalry".

In 1983, the distribution rights to The New Dick Van Dyke Show were acquired by Telepictures Corporation through its Perennial division, which was later acquired by Lorimar Productions, which was in turn acquired by Warner Bros. and merged into Warner Bros. Television Distribution.

== Sources ==
- The New Dick Van Dyke Show Billy Ingram, TVparty!
