= Carl Reiner on screen and stage =

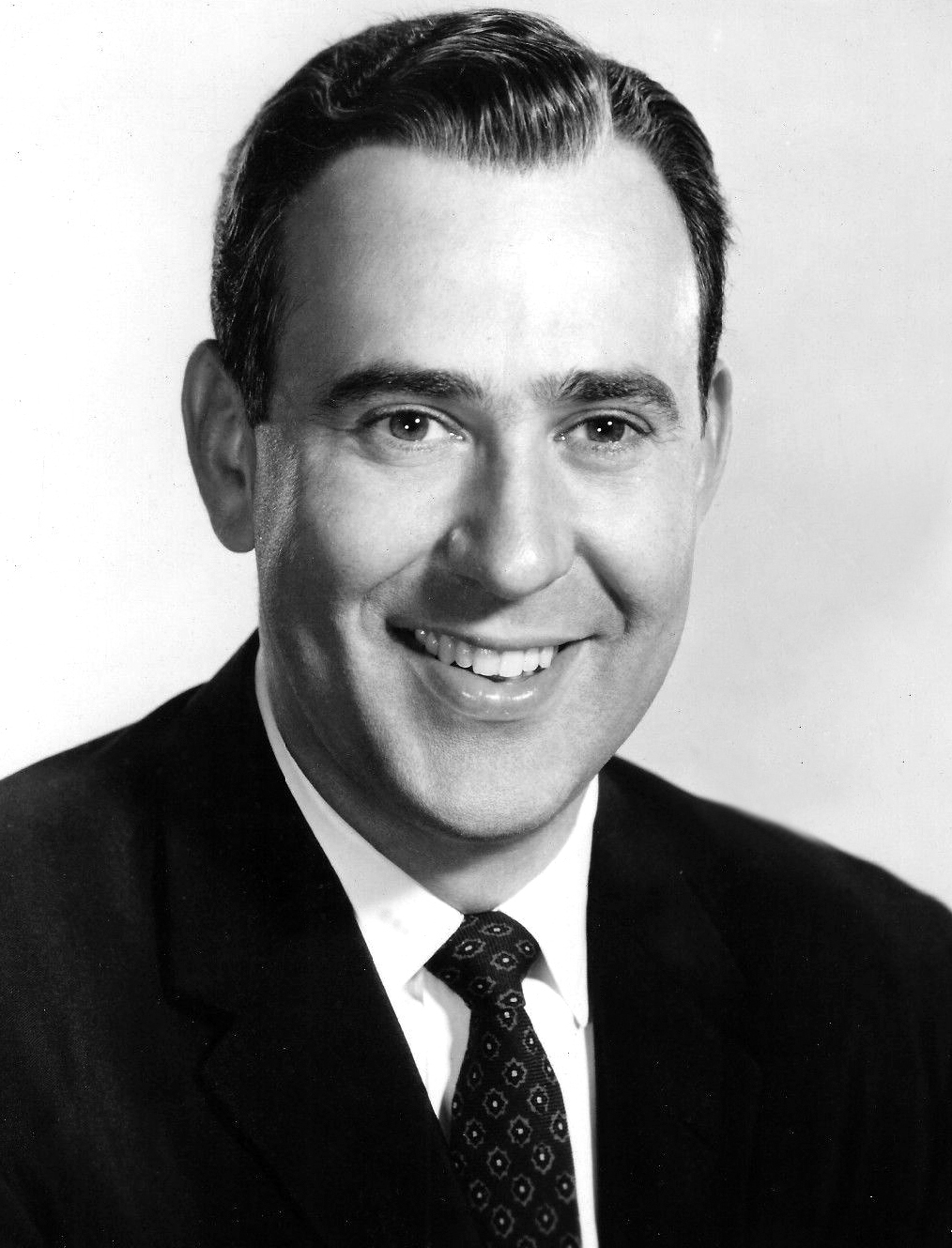
Carl Reiner in 1960

Carl Reiner was a writer, stand-up comedian, actor, and director of the stage and screen whose career spanned nearly 7 decades. His television credits include Your Show of Shows (1950–1954), Caesar's Hour (1954–1957), and The Dick Van Dyke Show (1961–1966). He also is known for his successful collaborations with Steve Martin such as The Jerk (1979), Dead Men Don't Wear Plaid (1982), and The Man with Two Brains (1983). He is also known for his standup comedy albums and television appearances with Mel Brooks.

== Filmography ==
=== Film ===
==== Actor ====
Year	Title	Role	Notes	Ref
1959	Happy Anniversary	Bud		
1959	The Gazebo	Harlow Edison		
1961	Gidget Goes Hawaiian	Russ Lawrence		
1963	The Thrill of It All	German Officer / Cad / Cowboy		
1963	It's a Mad, Mad, Mad, Mad World	Tower Controller at Rancho Conejo		
1965	John Goldfarb, Please Come Home!	Cameo appearance	Uncredited	
1965	The Art of Love	Rodin		
1966	Alice of Wonderland in Paris	Anatole	Voice	
1966	The Russians Are Coming, the Russians Are Coming	Walt Whittaker		
1966	Don't Worry, We'll Think of a Title	Bald Bookstore Customer	Uncredited	
1967	A Guide for the Married Man	Technical Adviser (Rance G.)		
1969	The Comic	Al Schilling		
1969	Generation	Stan Herman		
1973	Your Show of Shows	Himself		
1977	Oh, God!	Dinah's Guest		
1978	The End	Dr. James Maneet		
1979	The Jerk	Carl Reiner The Celebrity		
1981	History of the World, Part I	God	Voice, uncredited	
1982	Dead Men Don't Wear Plaid	Field Marshall VonKluck		
1987	In the Mood	Newsreel editor	Voice, uncredited	
1987	Summer School	Mr. Dearadorian		
1990	The Spirit of '76	Dr. Von Mobil		
1993	Fatal Instinct	Judge Ben Arugula		
1998	Slums of Beverly Hills	Mickey		
2000	The Adventures of Rocky and Bullwinkle	P. G. Biggershot		
2001	Ocean's Eleven	Saul Bloom		
2001	The Majestic	Studio Executive	Voice	
2003	Good Boy!	Shep	Voice	
2004	Ocean's Twelve	Saul Bloom		
2006	The Blue Elephant	Tian	Voice	
2007	Ocean's Thirteen	Saul Bloom		
2009	Merry Madagascar	Santa Claus	Voice	[35]
2014	Dumbbells	Donald Cummings		
2018	Ocean's 8	Saul Bloom	Cameo (scenes deleted)	
2018	Duck Duck Goose	Larry	Voice	
2019	Toy Story 4	Carl Reineroceros	Voice; final film role	

==== Director ====
Credits from the British Film Institute.

Year	Title	Distribution	Ref
1966	Enter Laughing	Columbia Pictures	
1969	The Comic	Columbia Pictures	
1970	Where's Poppa?	United Artists	
1977	Oh, God!	Warner Bros.	
1978	The One and Only	Paramount Pictures	
1979	The Jerk	Universal Pictures	
1982	Dead Men Don't Wear Plaid	Universal Pictures	
1983	The Man with Two Brains	Warner Bros.	
1984	All of Me	Universal Pictures	
1985	Summer Rental	Paramount Pictures	
1987	Summer School	Paramount Pictures	
1989	Bert Rigby, You're a Fool	Warner Bros.	
1990	Sibling Rivalry	Columbia Pictures	
1993	Fatal Instinct	Metro-Goldwyn-Mayer	
1997	That Old Feeling	Universal Pictures	

==== Screenwriter ====
Year	Title	Notes	Ref
1963	The Thrill of It All		
1965	The Art of Love		
1966	Enter Laughing	with Joseph Stein	
1969	The Comic	with Aaron Ruben	
1982	Dead Men Don't Wear Plaid	with Steve Martin and George Gipe	
1983	The Man with Two Brains	with Steve Martin and George Gipe	
1989	Bert Rigby, You're a Fool		

=== Television ===
==== Actor ====
Year	Title	Role	Notes	Ref
1950–54	Your Show of Shows	Himself	Regular performer; variety series	
1954–57	Caesar's Hour	Various roles	Variety series	
1958	The Sid Caesar Show	Woody Woodward	Variety series	
1961–66	The Dick Van Dyke Show	Alan Brady	32 episodes	
1964–69	Linus the Lionhearted	Various roles	Voice	
1969	That Girl	as himself	1 episode	
1970–72	Rowan & Martin's Laugh-In	Guest Performer	3 episodes	
1971	Night Gallery	Professor Peabody	Segment: "Professor Peabody's Last Lecture"	
1974	The Carol Burnett Show	Various characters	Episode: 7.17	
1975	The 2000 Year Old Man	Interviewer	Voice, television special	
1976	Happy Anniversary, Charlie Brown	Host	Documentary	
1976	Good Heavens	Mr. Angel	13 episodes	
1980	Steve Martin: Comedy Is Not Pretty	Sportscaster	1 episode	
1984	Faerie Tale Theatre	Geppetto	Episode: "Pinocchio"	
1987	Pound Puppies	Additional voice		
1991	Sunday Best	Host	3 episodes	
1993	Frasier	Roger	Voice, episode: "Selling Out"	
1995	Mad About You	Alan Brady	Episode: "The Alan Brady Show"	
1996	The Right to Remain Silent	Norman Friedler	TV movie	
1997–2000	King of the Hill	Garry Kasner	Voice, 2 episodes	
1997	The Larry Sanders Show	Carl Reiner	Episode: "The Roast"	
1998	Hercules	Prometheus	Voice, episode: "Hercules and the Prometheus Affair"	
1999	Beggars and Choosers	Sid Barry	Episode: "Always Leave 'Em Laughing"	
2000	Globehunters: An Around the World in 80 Days Adventure	Maz	Voice, television film	
2002–05	The Bernie Mac Show	Himself / Neighbor	3 episodes	
2002	Crossing Jordan	Harry Macy	Episode: "For Harry, with Love & Squalor"	
2002	Ally McBeal	Johnson Buck	Episode: "Bygones"	
2002–03	Life with Bonnie	Mr. Portinbody	3 episodes	
2004–05	Father of the Pride	Sarmoti	Voice, 15 episodes	
2005	Boston Legal	Milton Bombay	Episode: "Let Sales Ring"	
2009	House M.D.	Eugene Schwartz	Episode: "Both Sides Now"	
2009	Comedy Central Roast	Himself	Episode: "Joan Rivers"	
2009–14	Two and a Half Men	Marty Pepper	4 episodes	
2009	Merry Madagascar	Santa Claus	Voice, short	
2010	The Penguins of Madagascar	Santa Claus	Voice, episode: "The All Nighter Before Christmas"	
2010–14	Hot in Cleveland	Max	8 episodes	
2010–11	The Cleveland Show	Murray	Voice, 4 episodes	
2011–15	American Dad!	Irv / Mailbox #1	Voice, 2 episodes	
2012	Parks and Recreation	Ned Jones	Episode: "Campaign Shake-Up"	
2012	Comedians in Cars Getting Coffee	Himself	Episode: "I Want Sandwiches, I Want Chicken"	
2014	Bob's Burgers	Henry	Voice, episode: "Father of the Bob"	
2014–15	Jake and the Never Land Pirates	Captain Treasure Tooth	Voice, 4 episodes	
2015	WordGirl	Blue Blazer	Voice, episode: "The Good, Bad Old Days"	
2015	Blaze and the Monster Machines	Narrator	Voice, Episode: "Monster Machine Christmas"	
2015	Shimmer and Shine	Santa Claus	Voice, episode: "Santa's Little Genies"	
2016	Family Guy	Old Man; Fantasy Baseball Coach	Voice, 2 episodes	
2016	Justice League Action	The Wizard	Voice, episode: "Classic Rock"	
2017	If You're Not in the Obit, Eat Breakfast	Himself	Documentary, HBO	
2017	Young & Hungry	Bernie	Episode: "Young & Vegas Baby"	
2018	Angie Tribeca	Glenn-Allen Mixon	Episode: "Behind the Scandalabra"	
2019	Forky Asks a Question	Carl Reineroceros	Voice, episode: "What Is Love"	
2020	Home Movie: The Princess Bride	Grandfather	Episode: "Chapter Ten: To The Pain!"; posthumous release	

==== Director ====
Year	Title	Notes	Ref
1967	Good Morning World	4 episodes	
1971–1974	The New Dick Van Dyke Show	10 episodes	
1973	A Touch of Grace	Episode: "A Touch of Grace"	
1976	Good Heavens	7 episodes	

==== Writer ====
Year	Title	Notes	Ref
1954–1957	Caesar's Hour	3 episodes	
1959–1960	The Dinah Shore Chevy Show	11 episodes	
1961–1966	The Dick Van Dyke Show	158 episodes; also creator	
1962	The Comedy Spot	1 episode; also creator	
1971–1974	The New Dick Van Dyke Show	72 episodes; also creator	
1973	Lotsa Luck	22 episodes; also creator	
1975	The 2000 Year Old Man	with Mel Brooks	
2004	The Dick Van Dyke Show Revisited	Creator	
2011	The Cleveland Show	Episode: "Your Show of Shows"	

== Theatre ==
Year	Title	Role	Venue	Notes
1948	Inside U.S.A.	Performer – Various Characters	Majestic Theatre	
1950	Alive and Kicking	Performer – Various Characters	Winter Garden Theatre	
1967	Something Different	Playwright, Director	Cort Theatre	
1972	Tough to Get Help	Director	Royale Theatre	
1976	So Long, 174th Street	Original Source Material by	Harkness Theatre	
1980	The Roast	Director	Winter Garden Theatre	
