= Bud Molin =

American film editor and director (1925–2007)

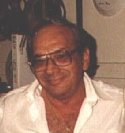
- Born: Henry David Molin; May 26, 1925; Los Angeles, California, US
- Died: May 21, 2007 (aged 81); Rancho Mirage, California, US
- Occupations: Film editor and director
- Years active: 1952-1993
- Spouse: Nita Molin

Henry David "Bud" Molin, A.C.E., (May 26, 1925 – May 21, 2007) was an American film editor and television director.

== Biography ==
=== Early life and career ===
Born in Los Angeles, California, Molin enlisted in the United States Army, and served in World War II before beginning his career. He first worked at the Columbia Pictures film library and then became an assistant film editor.

Most of Molin's best known work is in the comedy genre, having edited shows such as I Love Lucy, The Dick Van Dyke Show, and I Spy. He often worked with Dann Cahn and also collaborated with Carl Reiner on some his comedies of the 1970s and 80s, which ranged from the commercial success of Oh, God! and The Jerk to experimental pictures such as Dead Men Don't Wear Plaid and Bert Rigby, You're a Fool. Although best known for comedy, he also edited dramas as well, such as They Call Me Mister Tibbs! and Halls of Anger, both dealing with racial relations.

As his career progressed, Molin branched out to directing the television series Good Heavens, and served as the assistant director on the film Up the Academy. He also was a post-production executive for the TV series Barney Miller. In 1993, Molin came out of retirement to edit his last film, the comedy Fatal Instinct, a film by friend Carl Reiner.

=== Death ===
On May 21, 2007, Molin died at his home at the age of 81 in Rancho Mirage, California.

== Selected filmography ==
=== Director ===
- The New Dick Van Dyke Show (1 episode, 1974)
- Good Heavens (1 episode, 1976)

=== Editor ===
- Our Miss Brooks (4 episodes, 1952–1953)
- Forever, Darling (1956)
- The Real McCoys (2 episodes, 1957)
- Whirlybirds (3 episodes, 1957)
- I Love Lucy (107 episodes, 1953–1957)
- The Lucy-Desi Comedy Hour (4 episodes, 1958–1959)
- The Dick Van Dyke Show (116 episodes, 1961-1965)
- I Spy (16 episodes, 1965-1966)
- The Guns of Will Sonnett (1 episode, 1967)
- How Sweet It Is! (1968)
- Where's Poppa? (1970)
- The New Dick Van Dyke Show (10 episodes, 1971-1974)
- The Brothers O'Toole (1973)
- Oh, God! (1977)
- The One and Only (1978)
- Bloodline (1979)
- The Jerk (1979)
- Dead Men Don't Wear Plaid (1982)
- The Man with Two Brains (1983)
- All of Me (1984)
- The Man with One Red Shoe (1985)
- Summer Rental (1985)
- Police Academy 3: Back in Training (1986)
- Summer School (1987)
- The Experts (1989)
- Stella (1990)
- Sibling Rivalry (1990)
- Fatal Instinct (1993)

== Award nominations ==
Year	Award	Result	Category	Series
1966	American Cinema Editors	Nominated	Best Edited Television Program	I Spy (For episode "The Loser")
1967	Best Edited Television Program	Nominated	I Spy (For episode "Court of the Lion")	
