= Reni Santoni =

American actor (1938–2020)

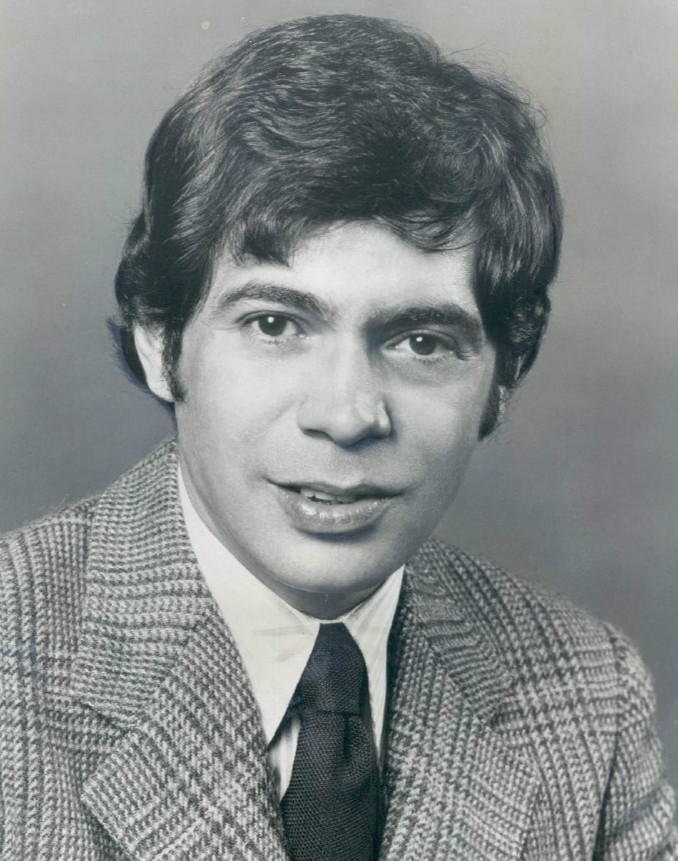
- Santoni in 1973
- Born: Renaldo Santoni; April 21, 1938; New York City, U.S.
- Died: August 1, 2020 (aged 82); Los Angeles, California, U.S.
- Other name: Reni Sands
- Occupation: Actor
- Years active: 1962–2012
- Spouse: Lisa James
- Partner: Betty Thomas
- Children: 1

Renaldo Santoni (April 21, 1938 – August 1, 2020) was an American film, television and voice actor. He was noted for playing Poppie on the television sitcom Seinfeld, Tony Gonzales in Cobra, and Chico González in Dirty Harry.

== Early life ==
Santoni was born in New York City on April 21, 1938. His family was of Corsican and Spanish descent. Santoni's ethnically ambiguous appearance allowed him to play roles from a variety of backgrounds, including Italian, Hispanic, and Jewish characters. He began his career in Off-Broadway theatre, writing the play Raisin' Hell in the Son which premiered in 1962. Reni is short for Renaldo.

== Career ==
Santoni's first significant film role was an uncredited appearance in the 1964 film The Pawnbroker (starring Rod Steiger), in which he played a junkie trying to sell a radio to the title character (using antisemitic slurs to no effect). His first leading role was as a young actor in Enter Laughing. He was cast into the role of delivery boy David Kolowitz after being scouted by Carl Reiner; the film was a semi-autobiographical story about the latter. Santoni went on to play Inspector "Chico" González in the 1971 film Dirty Harry. His character, who is a newcomer detective and college graduate in sociology, was initially dismissed by the title character as "a college boy". He ultimately uttered the memorable phrase, "No wonder they call him Dirty Harry; [he] always gets the shit end of the stick".

Santoni again collaborated with Reiner in the comedic homage to film noir Dead Men Don't Wear Plaid (1982). His other film roles during this decade included juvenile correction facility officer Ramon Herrera in Bad Boys (1983), as well as Detective Tony Gonzales in the action film Cobra (1986) opposite Sylvester Stallone. He featured in the short-lived series Sanchez of Bel Air and Manimal, in which he played Nick Rivera. He was described by Tracy Newman as having a completely different personality from the characters he played, which were most frequently cops, crime lords, or judges. She noted his reputation among friends as being "the funniest guy in the room".

Santoni made guest appearances on television shows such as Barnaby Jones, Lou Grant, Hawaii Five-O, Hardcastle and McCormick, Hill Street Blues, The Odd Couple and Midnight Caller. In 1973, Santoni played a junior partner on Owen Marshall: Counselor at Law. His most notable later role was as Poppie, the bombastic, antiabortion, neurotic, and very unhygienic restaurateur in Seinfeld.

== Personal life ==
Santoni was married to Lisa James. He then had a long-term relationship with actress and director Betty Thomas. He had a son named Nick.

== Death ==
Santoni died on August 1, 2020, at a hospice in Los Angeles at the age of 82. He had several health problems during his last years, including cancer.

== Partial filmography ==
Sources:

- Strangers in the City (1962) – Scrounge
- The Pawnbroker (1964) – Junkie Selling Radio
- Enter Laughing (1967) – David Kolowitz
- A Great Big Thing (1968) – Vinny Shea
- Anzio (1968) – Pvt. Movie
- Guns of the Magnificent Seven (1969) – Max
- The Student Nurses (1970) – Victor Charlie
- Dirty Harry (1971) – Inspector Chico Gonzalez
- I Never Promised You a Rose Garden (1977) – Hobbs
- They Went That-A-Way & That-A-Way (1978) – Billy Joe
- Dead Men Don't Wear Plaid (1982) – Carlos Rodriguez
- Bad Boys (1983) – Ramon Herrera
- Brewster's Millions (1985) – Vin Rapelito
- Radioactive Dreams (1985) – 'Red' Hairstylist / Adult Harold
- Summer Rental (1985) – Announcer
- Cobra (1986) – Sergeant Tony Gonzales
- The Pick-up Artist (1987) – Man in Train Station
- Bright Lights, Big City (1988, voice)
- The Package (1989) – Chicago Police Lieutenant
- Cat Chaser (1989) – Narrator (voice, uncredited)
- Men Don't Tell (1992) – Rueben the Bartender
- Groundhog Day (1993) – voice of State Trooper
- The Brady Bunch Movie (1995) – Police Officer
- The Late Shift (1996) – John Agoglia
- Private Parts (1997) – Vallesecca
- Can't Hardly Wait (1998) – Cop
- Dr. Dolittle (1998) – voice of Rat #1
- 28 Days (2000) – Daniel
- Dr. Dolittle 2 (2001) – voice of Rat #1
- Kingpin (2003, mini series) – General Valdez
- Gang Warz (2004) – Father Luis
- Irene in Time (2009) – Sam

=== TV series ===
- Miami Vice ("Badge of Dishonor") – Lt. Arturo Dominguez
- The Odd Couple (1970) – (season 1 Episode 15 "The Hideaway") Ernie Wilson, the football player
- Hawaii Five-O (1978) Episode: "A Death in the Family" – Jimmy Rego
- Rockford Files 1979 episode "A Different Drummer" - cast as a knowledgeable mental patient
- CHiPs S5 - E25 (Overload) Computer thief - 1 episode (1982)
- Sanchez of Bel Air - (1986, 13 episodes) - Ricardo Sanchez
- Murder, She Wrote - 2 episodes (1989, 1994)
- Quantum Leap (2-part episode "Lee Harvey Oswald", Sgt. Lopez; 1992)
- NYPD Blue (1995–1996, 3 episodes) - Det. Archie Solomon, Sal Campisi
- Seinfeld (1994 - 1998, 5 episodes) - Poppie
- Walker Texas Ranger (1996)
- Grey's Anatomy (2005) - Alan Griswold
- According to Jim (2002) - Season 2, Episode 4 - Tony
