= Two Brains =

Two Brains may refer to:

- Dr. Two-Brains, a character in WordGirl, a children's TV series
- David Willetts, a British politician

== See also ==
- The Man with Two Brains, a 1983 comedy film starring Steve Martin
