= Fatal Instinct =

1993 film by Carl Reiner

- Theatrical release poster
- Directed by: Carl Reiner
- Written by: David O'Malley
- Produced by: Pierce Gardner; Katie Jacobs
- Starring: Armand Assante; Sherilyn Fenn; Kate Nelligan; Sean Young; Tony Randall
- Narrated by: Armand Assante
- Cinematography: Gabriel Beristain
- Edited by: Bud Molin Stephen R. Myers
- Music by: Richard Gibbs
- Production company: Metro-Goldwyn-Mayer
- Distributed by: MGM/UA Distribution Co.
- Release date: October 29, 1993
- Running time: 90 minutes
- Country: United States
- Language: English
- Box office: $7.8 million

Fatal Instinct is a 1993 American sex comedy thriller film directed by Carl Reiner. A parody of the erotic thriller genre, which at the time had reached its commercial peak, as well as being a pastiche of 1940s film noir and psychological thriller genres, in particular Double Indemnity, the film stars Armand Assante as lawyer/cop Ned Ravine (a take-off on Body Heat, in which William Hurt plays the similarly named Ned Racine) who has an affair with a woman named Lola Cain (Sean Young). Kate Nelligan stars as Ned's wife and Sherilyn Fenn stars as his secretary. It also satirizes Sleeping With The Enemy many times. The film title is a combination of Fatal Attraction and Basic Instinct, both of which star Michael Douglas.

== Plot ==
Ned Ravine, who is both a police officer and lawyer (who often defends the people he arrests), believes that he knows everything about women, and says that he will throw away his badge if anyone ever proves him wrong. While on a stakeout, he encounters a seductive woman named Lola Cain; the next day, Lola shows up at his law office, saying that she needs him to look over some papers she has come across. Meanwhile, Max Shady, who was just released from prison after seven years, starts stalking Ned, planning to kill him for failing to successfully defend Max in court.

Ned's wife Lana and her car mechanic Frank, with whom she is having an affair, start plotting to kill Ned in order to collect on his accident insurance, which has a triple indemnity rider; if Ned is shot, falls from a northbound train, and drowns in a freshwater stream, Lana will collect nine million dollars.

Lola gets Ned to come to her house to examine the "papers", which are actually a laundry receipt and an expired lottery ticket, and the two of them end up having sex in various wild ways. The next morning, Ned says that they can never do that again because he loves his wife; this drives Lola to start stalking Ned.

A few days later, Ned takes the train to go to a legal symposium; Lana and Frank are also on the train, and so is Max. When the train passes over a lake, Lana shoots Max 36 times with a revolver, mistaking him for Ned, and he backflips through the door to his death; Ned thinks that Lana had acted to save his life. He arrests Lana, and then defends her in court, getting her cleared of all charges. Lana later kills Frank, believing that he was going to abandon her, by pinning him against a wall with his power drill; Lola witnesses this, and starts blackmailing Lana.

Ned confronts Lola, and learns that she and Lana are identical twin sisters; after Lana had smashed Lola's face with a shovel, the doctors had given her a whole new face, causing the man she loved to leave her for Lana; Frank was the man's son. Lola's plan from the beginning was to get revenge on Lana by seducing her husband and ruining her marriage.

Later, Ned's secretary Laura tells Ned about Lana's plans to kill him, having figured it out herself. Upstairs, Lana is attacked by Lola, who drowns her in the bathtub. While Ned goes upstairs to investigate, Laura's abusive husband (whom she had escaped from three years ago) comes in and confronts her; she kills him with a frying pan. Lola and Ned fight, and Lola falls to her death from the second-floor landing after Ned pushes her back with a powered-up hair dryer through a broken handrail (which Lana had sawn off earlier). As Ned and Laura embrace each other (and Ned throws his badge away), Lola and Lana come back to life and attack; Laura shoots them both. Ned and Laura marry a few days later.

== Cast ==
- Armand Assante as Ned Ravine
- Sherilyn Fenn as Laura Lingonberry
- Kate Nelligan as Lana Ravine
- Sean Young as Lola Cain
- Christopher McDonald as Frank Kelbo
- James Remar as Max Shady
- John Witherspoon as Arch
- Bob Uecker as himself
- Clarence Clemons as himself
- Eartha Kitt as Trial Judge
- Tony Randall as Judge Skanky
- Bill Cobbs as Man In Park (uncredited)
- Rosie O'Donnell as Woman In Pet Store (uncredited)

== Reception ==
On Rotten Tomatoes it has an approval rating of 17% based on 23 reviews, with an average rating of 4.3/10. On Metacritic it has a score of 33% based on reviews from 24 critics, indicating "generally unfavorable" reviews. Audiences polled by CinemaScore gave the film an average grade of "C" on an A+ to F scale.

In his review for the Chicago Sun-Times, Roger Ebert rated it one and a half stars out of four and stated "It's a strange thing about the parody genre: Some of these movies work ... and some don't. And you can't say why, except that sometimes you laugh, and sometimes you don't, and the reasons for that are not arguable." Janet Maslin of The New York Times felt the film's gags "vary much too wildly in terms of timing and wit. All that hold this comedy together are a playful outlook and a conviction that detective stories are intrinsically funny, especially if the detective is as much of a blockhead as Ned Ravine. As played by Armand Assante, Ned is a bit too convincingly dense, but he does make a useful fall guy."

The film opened on 1,886 screens in the United States and Canada on October 29, 1993, and grossed $3,502,569 in its opening weekend, placing sixth at the box office. It went on to gross $7.8 million in the United States and Canada.

== Home media ==
The film was first released in March 1994 on VHS and it is available on DVD and Blu-ray, in North America and Europe.

== See also ==
- List of American films of 1993
