= Sibling Rivalry (film) =

1990 film by Carl Reiner

- Theatrical release poster
- Directed by: Carl Reiner
- Written by: Martha Goldhirsh
- Produced by: Liz Glotzer; David Lester; Don Miller
- Starring: Kirstie Alley; Bill Pullman; Carrie Fisher; Jami Gertz; Scott Bakula; Sam Elliott; Ed O'Neill
- Cinematography: Reynaldo Villalobos
- Edited by: Bud Molin
- Music by: Jack Elliott
- Production companies: Castle Rock Entertainment; Nelson Entertainment
- Distributed by: Columbia Pictures
- Release date: October 26, 1990
- Running time: 88 minutes
- Country: United States
- Language: English
- Budget: $16 million
- Box office: $17.8 million

Sibling Rivalry is a 1990 American black comedy film directed by Carl Reiner and starring Kirstie Alley, Sam Elliott, Jami Gertz, Bill Pullman, Carrie Fisher, and Scott Bakula.

== Plot ==
Marjorie Turner has been married for eight years and is tired of her husband Harry's neglect and his snooty relatives, most of them doctors. One day her younger sister, Jeanine, urges her to break out of her rut and have a fling.

At a grocery store, Marjorie allows herself to be picked up for a quick sexual tryst. Unfortunately, her lover dies during the act. Even more unfortunately, the dead man turns out to be Harry's long-absent brother Charles.

Complications ensue, some of them involving a vertical blinds salesman named Nick. He was in the hallway, wanting to get into a room to install blinds so he could convince the hotel to invest in them.

When Marjorie leaves the room, she inadvertently both drops her wallet and leaves the door ajar. Thinking he's in luck, Nick gets to work hanging the blinds. Halfway through a pole slips, hitting the lifeless man in the bed. Feeling responsible for the man's death, he calls Marjorie as he assumes she's his wife.

Marjorie goes to the hotel room to get her wallet back, and she and Nick panic, so they decide to make it look like a suicide. She writes a suicide note, and they empty bottles of pills down his throat. From home, she calls 911 to report the death.

When police arrive, Nick is in the room and insists it must have been a prank. His brother Wilbur is a police officer investigating the case. He meets Jeanine while investigating the 911 call. They have chemistry and become involved.

The autopsy reveals the non-lethal pills in Charles's esophagus as well as possible evidence of cardiac arrest. In the meantime, Nick has confessed to accidentally hitting Charles in the head with the blind hardware. Calling a family meeting, Harry fills them in on the investigation, Jeanine bursts in, telling Marjorie about Nick protecting her by confessing.

Marjorie comes clean in front of everyone, and when Harry's family hears they attack her. He tells them to get out. Shortly after, he both leaves the practice and moves away.

Months later, things are looking up for the siblings. Nick finally becomes successful selling blinds, Wilbur has become police chief and Jeanine moves in with him. Marjorie gets the story about her, Harry and Charles published and Harry comes back after having opened his own practice to start over.

== Cast ==
- Kirstie Alley as Marjorie Turner
- Bill Pullman as Nicholas Meany, Wilbur's younger brother
- Carrie Fisher as Iris Turner-Hunter, Harry's younger sister
- Jami Gertz as Jeanine, Marjorie's younger sister
- Scott Bakula as Harry Turner, Marjorie's husband
- Frances Sternhagen as Rose Turner, Harry's mother
- John Randolph as Charles Turner Sr., Harry's father
- Paul Benedict as Dr. Plotner
- Sam Elliott as Charles Turner Jr., Harry's older brother
- Ed O'Neill as Wilbur Meany
- Bill Macy as Pat
- Matthew Laurance as Casey Hunter, Iris's husband

== Production ==
Principal photography began on April 16, 1990, and ended on June 21, 1990. Filming took place in and Los Angeles and Marin County, California. Interior scenes were filmed on set at Warner Bros. Studios.

== Release ==
Sibling Rivalry was released on October 26, 1990, in 1,448 theatres. It opened at #2 at the box office, grossing $4 million in its opening weekend. It stayed at #2 in its second weekend grossing $8.424.402. After three months in theatres, the film went on to gross $17,854,933 in its theatrical run.

=== Reception ===
The film received negative reviews from critics and has a 25% rating on Rotten Tomatoes from 12 reviews.

In his review, Roger Ebert wrote, "The screenplay is founded on the ageless principles of screwball comedy, but the film lacks the energy, the timing and the sense of manic frenzy that's generated by the best screwball." In contrast, TV Guide wrote, "Despite some rough patches when the heavy plotting threatens to overwhelm the proceedings, Sibling Rivalry is brash, madcap entertainment." The review added, "Although some of the supporting roles aren't cast felicitously…the film generates enough belly laughs to coast over these over-played spots and emerge with its hilarity intact. Whether the twists and turns of this complicated game of 'what to do with the body' would work as ingeniously well without Kirstie Alley is open to question. She's the comedy's heart and soul. In the wrong hands, her character could have seemed like a whiny neurotic, but Alley's ace timing, understated delivery, and verve result in a flawless comic creation--a goody two shoes who liberates herself from playing the constricting role that her in-laws and her own inhibitions prescribe."
