= Lucas Reiner =

American painter (born 1960)

- Born: Lucas Joseph Reiner; August 17, 1960 (age 66); Los Angeles, California, U.S.
- Education: Parsons School of Design; Otis College of Art and Design; Parsons School of Design Paris
- Known for: Painter; printmaker; photographer; filmmaker
- Spouse: Maud Winchester
- Children: 2
- Parents: Carl Reiner (father); Estelle Reiner (mother)
- Family: Rob Reiner (brother); Annie Reiner (sister); Michele Singer Reiner (sister-in-law); Tracy Reiner (adoptive niece)

Lucas Joseph Reiner (/ˈraɪnər/; born August 17, 1960) is an American painter, printmaker, photographer and filmmaker. He is most known for painting series that mix elements of representation, narrative, symbolism and abstraction. The work explores subjects such as the collision between organic growth and urban life, the atmospheric effects of fireworks and spiritual themes. His work belongs to the collections of the Los Angeles County Museum of Art, Santa Barbara Museum of Art and Staatliche Graphische Sammlung München, among others, and a monograph of his paintings, drawings and photographs, Los Angeles Trees (2008), was selected as one of the Los Angeles Times "Favorite Books of 2008."

L.A. Times critic David Pagel wrote that Reiner's "paintings of trees trimmed to within inches of their lives have the pathos of circus freaks and the stubbornness of survivalists." Reiner has exhibited in the U.S., Germany, Italy and Mexico, at institutions including Los Angeles Municipal Art Gallery and Museo de la Estampa.

Lucas Reiner, On Venice Blvd. #12, oil on canvas, 14.5" x 15.5", 2010.

== Early life ==
Reiner was born in Los Angeles, California on August 17, 1960, the third child of actor, comedian, director and writer Carl Reiner and visual artist and performer Estelle (née Lebost) Reiner. His brother was filmmaker Rob Reiner.

== Career ==
He attributes his interest in art to his mother; both studied with painter Martin Lubner. Between 1978 and 1986, Reiner attended Parsons School of Design and The New School for Social Research in New York, Otis Art Institute in Los Angeles, and Parsons School of Design Paris. He began exhibiting in group shows in New York (The Drawing Center, Grand Salon) and Los Angeles (Manny Silverman) in the early 1990s, before having his first solo exhibition of paintings at Bennett Roberts (1995, Los Angeles).

In subsequent years, he has exhibited individually at Roberts & Tilton and Carl Berg Projects in Los Angeles, Galerie Biedermann and Galerie Peter Bauemler in Germany, and Galeria Traghetto and Claudia Gian Ferrari Arte Contemporanea in Italy, and in group exhibitions at L.A. Louver, CSU Luckman Gallery, Edward Cella Art + Architecture, and Bridge Projects, among others.

== Work ==
Reiner's influences include Old Master painters and modern figures such as Mark Rothko, Robert Ryman, and Philip Guston; writer Fred Dewey makes links between Reiner's work and that of Giorgio Morandi. Reiner's early, largely abstract work (which nonetheless references the physical world through color, surface, and text fragments) bears the influence of conceptualism and minimalism in its reduction of content and figuration in reaction. His post-2000 work introduces representational elements, often references to the urban landscape and natural phenomena.

Lucas Reiner, Dead Dog, oil on canvas, 72" x 63", 1995

=== Early paintings ===
Reiner's solo debut at Bennett Roberts featured paintings that distilled everyday experiences into color field-like abstractions; Art in America likened them to "core samples" extracted from Los Angeles's cultural landscape that "resonate with emotion, poetry and gritty reportage" (e.g., dead dog and thank god roses, both 1995). He began such work with "field studies"—coded recordings of the colors, verbal fragments and commercial signage of street scenes—which he translated into the chart-like, geometric paintings. LA Weekly critic Peter Frank wrote that the floating, tenuous squares of color "marry vernacular haiku to very shy minimalism," yielding results "both less mysterious and more affecting than they sound."

In subsequent shows, Reiner moved toward more all-over abstract compositions. The exhibition "milk, piss, blood, rust, dirt" (1996) consisted of five large paintings, which combined color-field explorations with wry or poignant inscriptions referencing collective notions concerning the title substances. "Starting with the Flower" (Griffin Contemporary Exhibitions, 1998) featured paintings built upon oppositions of materiality and light lyricism, the abject and transcendent (e.g., Rope Trick and Chicken Flower); reviews suggest they recall Guston's scumbled, discordant coloration and crudely defined shapes and the scorched, scarred surfaces of Antoni Tàpies. In the later 1990s, Reiner incorporated urban signage to a greater degree in small paintings (e.g., La Petite Beauty and Grace, 1999) that indicate the aesthetic impact of Richard Diebenkorn, Vija Celmins, and Ed Ruscha, who appeared with him in the show, "Urban Hymns" (Luckman Gallery, 2000).

=== "Los Angeles Trees" (2001–10) ===
Following a trip to Michigan in 2001, during which he observed unconstrained forests, Reiner began drawing and painting the street-side, largely non-native trees in Los Angeles, noting the strange shapes resulting from the sometimes brutal interventions and functional strictures of modern civilization. He first exhibited the results at Roberts & Tilton in 2003: intimate paintings of loosely rendered, cropped treetops removed from their surroundings and set against delicately colored, minimal abstract-expressionist backgrounds. Peter Frank likened Reiner's painterly technique to Barbizon realism, but noted a deeper, more metaphysical meditation on what he described as icon-like images of subjects more resembling "untree things"—clouds, heads of hair, tornadoes, maps, paintings.

Several critics remark on the tree paintings' level of detail and individuality, which evoke the personality, character and narrative of portraiture (evidenced by Reiner's inclusion in a 2007 "Portraits" show at Carl Berg Projects). Petra Giloy Hirtz wrote that the trees—crooked, pruned by traffic or grazed by trucks, and strangely trimmed to clear views of billboards, signs, Christmas decorations or graffiti—each reveal a story involving "the domestication of nature by civilization, of survival in an urban context." Others, such as Sylvia Schiechtl, suggest that Reiner's dense brushstrokes express a sense of tenacious lifeforce, an allegory for the tension between external social constraints and internal, boundless energy; his engagement with the material limitations of painting suggests themes involving the desire for freedom and transcendence. In addition to shows in the U.S., Germany, Italy and Latvia exploring a wider range of formats, Reiner's paintings, drawings and film stills of trees were published in the monograph Los Angeles Trees (2008).

Lucas Reiner, Himmelsleiter, tempera on canvas, 63" x 41", 2017.

=== Later series ===
In the 2000s, Reiner produced a concurrent series of large paintings exploring the ephemeral after-effects of fireworks. His "Redentore" series captures pyrotechnic afterglows illuminating amorphous, shadowy masses of smoke that quickly recede in diffusing light. He painted them in wax and oil, the wax drying his pigment to create scarped, roughly textured passages of varying sheen, whose forms and visible erasures convey the passing of time. Modern Painters described his attempt to capture the transitory as an "impossibly tender and romantic gesture" evoking 'the great mysterious void at the heart of existence."

In the wake of his mother's death in 2008, Reiner began his "Stations of the Cross" series (2008–18), a project initiated by a commission from St. Augustine's Episcopal Church in Washington, DC. The initial project included watercolor studies and fifteen drypoint etchings, and culminated in fifteen large, chromatically different mixed-media canvasses. They represent the Stations (the traditional devotional narrative of Jesus' passage from condemnation to death and redemption) through trees of varying species and positions; engaging the Christian notion of the tree of Jesus's suffering as one of salvation, the work seeks to create a contemporary, non-affiliated visual space for empathy and the contemplation of suffering, loss and transcendence. Between 2017 and 2019, Reiner developed a similarly contemplative series, "Himmelsleiter" ("Ladder to Heaven"), inspired by the subtle modulations of Berlin's heavy, gray sky as seen from his studio window (e.g., Exile, 2017); this work harkens to his fireworks series' considerations of materiality and surface, and inner and observed worlds.

=== Photography and filmmaking ===
Reiner's color photographs of Los Angeles trees have been included in solo exhibitions at Pocket Utopia (Brooklyn, 2007) and Dinter Fine Art (New York, 2009) and group exhibitions in Germany and New York. As a filmmaker, he has directed both feature and short films that have screened internationally at film festivals and in galleries. His short films include Trees of Los Angeles (2005), Signs of Los Angeles (1999), Waking Up (1998), and Balancing Act (1996). His feature films include The Gold Cup (1999), described as a bohemian-flavored ensemble piece set in a Los Angeles café, and the time-travel comedy and 1970s parody, The Spirit of '76 (1990), which starred David Cassidy and Olivia d'Abo.

== Public collections and recognition ==
Reiner's work has been acquired by private and public collections including those of the Los Angeles County Museum of Art, Santa Barbara Museum of Art, American Embassy (Riga, Latvia), Colección Jumex, Diözesanmuseum Freising (Germany), Staatliche Graphische Sammlung München, and the West Collection. He received an artist residency at Catena Artistorum in 2020, and has been a visiting artist at institutions in the U.S. and Europe, such as Farmlab and American Academy in Rome.

== Personal life ==
Reiner is based in Los Angeles and Berlin, and married to Maud Winchester.
