= Francis Xavier McCarthy =

American actor (born 1942)

Francis X. McCarthy
- Born: February 15, 1942 (age 84); New York, U.S.
- Other name: Frank McCarthy
- Occupation: Actor

Francis Xavier McCarthy (mostly credited as Frank McCarthy, born February 15, 1942) is an American actor. He appeared in films including Dead Men Don't Wear Plaid (1982), Summer Rental (1985), Death Spa (1988), Downtown (1990), BASEketball (1998), Hidden Agenda (2001), No Good Deed (2002), Imaginaerum (2012) and Interstellar (2014).

On television, McCarthy had more than 100 credits, notable appearing in miniseries and made-for-television movies Blind Ambition, The French Atlantic Affair, Hellinger's Law, Blood Feud, If Tomorrow Comes and Rudy: The Rudy Giuliani Story. He had recurring roles on St. Elsewhere, 21 Jump Street, Melrose Place, The Practice, Port Charles, NYPD Blue and Motive and Second Chance.

McCarthy guest-starred on The Rockford Files, The Greatest American Hero, The Love Boat, Cheers, Cagney & Lacey, Moonlighting, Hill Street Blues, Dallas, Alf, Frasier, 3rd Rock from the Sun, Boy Meets World, Supernatural, Bates Motel, 9-1-1 and NCIS.

== Filmography ==
Year	Title	Role	Notes
1980	Altered States	Obispo	
1981	Cutter's Way	Paul Savage	
1981	Zoot Suit	Press	
1981	Pennies from Heaven	The Bartender	
1982	Dead Men Don't Wear Plaid	A Waiter	
1982	The Sting II	Lonnegan's Thug #1	
1983	Reaching Out	Frank Mesina	
1983	The Man with Two Brains	Olsen	
1985	Tuff Turf	Man At Bus Stop	
1985	Summer Rental	Hal	
1985	That Was Then... This Is Now	Mr. Carlson	
1987	Summer School	Principal Kelban	
1988	Action Jackson	Oliver O'Rooney	
1988	Alien Nation	Captain Warner	
1989	Death Spa	Lieutenant Fletcher	
1990	Downtown	Inspector Ben Glass	
1990	Night Visions	Commissioner Nathan Dowd	
1993	Dead Center	Cordoba	
1994	Greedy	Daniel McTeague Sr.	
1995	The Stranger	Havel	
1997	The Relic	George Blaisedale	
1998	Deep Impact	General Scott	
1998	BASEketball	Dr. Kaiser	
1999	Diplomatic Siege	Parker	
2001	Hidden Agenda	Deputy Director Powell	
2002	No Good Deed	Bank Manager	
2003	Beyond Borders	Strauss	
2003	Red Rover	George Callahan	
2003	Going for Broke	Brad Bradford	
2004	Beacon Hill	Chick Muldoon	
2008	Story of Jen	George Weinmark	
2012	Imaginaerum	Tom Whitman - age 70	
2014	Interstellar	"Boots"	
2017	Angel of Christmas	Grandpa James Nicholas	Television film
2018	9-1-1	Thomas	Episode: "Buck, Actually"
2018	On the Basis of Sex	Judge Daugherty	
2022–2025	NCIS	Roman Parker	4 episodes
