= List of awards and nominations received by Carl Reiner =

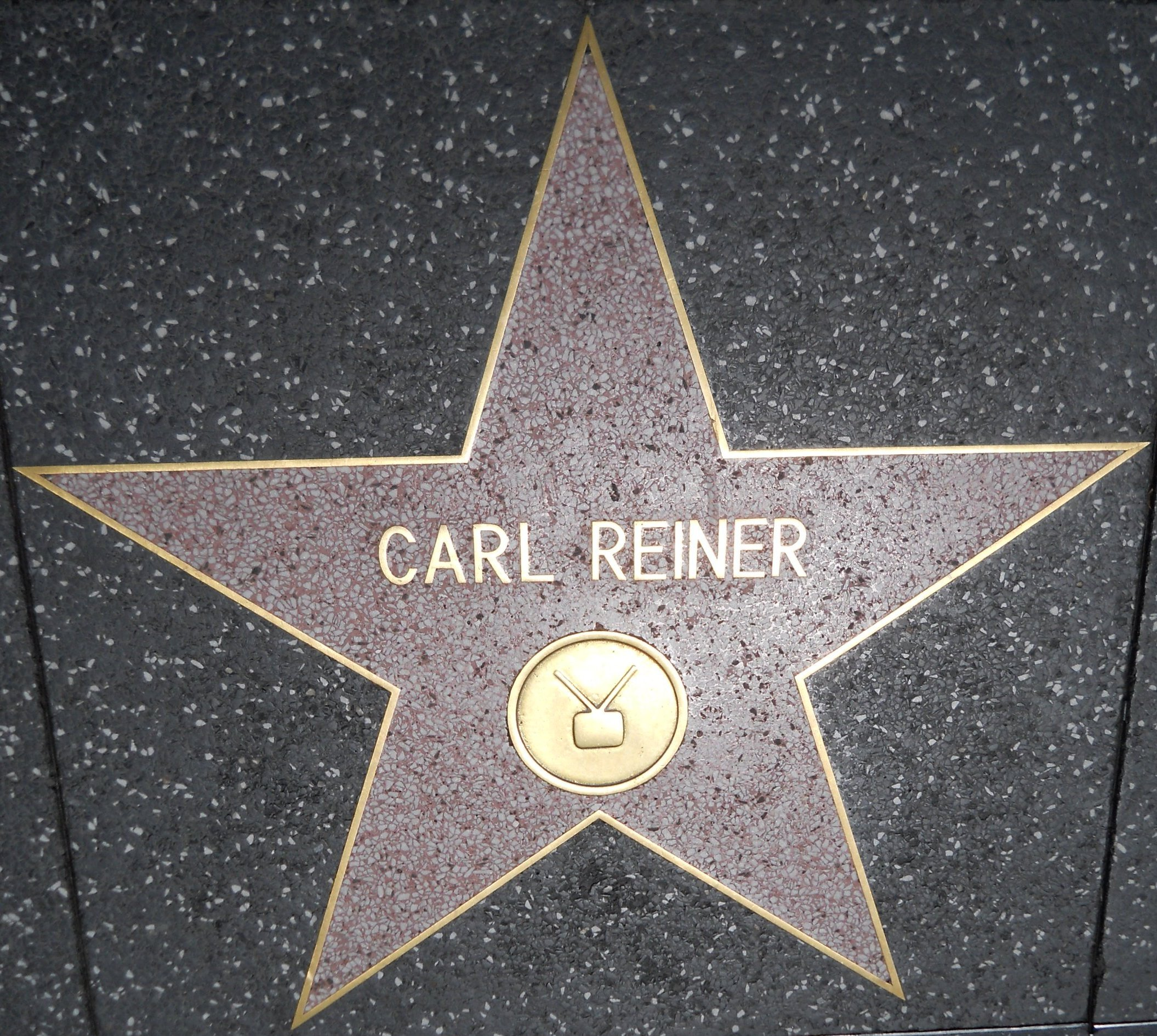
Reiner's star on the Hollywood Walk of Fame

Carl Reiner was an actor, comedian, writer and director of film and television. Over Reiner's long television and film career, he earned numerous awards. From his stand-up comedy albums with Mel Brooks to writing on Your Show of Shows, Caesar's Hour, and The Dick Van Dyke Show, Reiner earned 11 Primetime Emmy Awards and one Grammy Award.

== Major awards ==
=== Emmy Awards ===
Year	Category	Nominated work	Result	Ref.
Primetime Emmy Awards
1954	Outstanding Supporting Actor	Your Show of Shows	Nominated	
1956	Outstanding Supporting Actor	Caesar's Hour	Nominated	
1957	Outstanding Supporting Actor	Caesar's Hour	Won	
1958	Outstanding Supporting Actor	Caesar's Hour	Won	
1962	Outstanding Writing for a Comedy Series	The Dick Van Dyke Show	Won	
1963	Outstanding Writing for a Comedy Series	The Dick Van Dyke Show	Won	
1963	Outstanding Comedy Series	The Dick Van Dyke Show	Won	
1964	Outstanding Writing for a Comedy Series	The Dick Van Dyke Show	Won	
1964	Outstanding Comedy Series	The Dick Van Dyke Show	Won	
1965	Outstanding Achievements in Writing	The Dick Van Dyke Show	Won	
1965	Outstanding Achievements in Writing	The Dick Van Dyke Show	Nominated	
1966	Outstanding Comedy Series	The Dick Van Dyke Show	Won	
1966	Special Individual Achievement	Linus! The Lion Hearted	Nominated	
1967	Outstanding Writing for a Variety Series	The Sid Caesar, Imogene Coca, Carl Reiner, Howard Morris Special	Won	
1995	Outstanding Guest Actor in a Comedy Series	Mad About You	Won	
2000	Outstanding Guest Actor in a Comedy Series	Beggars and Choosers	Nominated	
2004	Outstanding Special Class Program	The Dick Van Dyke Show Revisited	Nominated	
2018	Outstanding Narrator	If You're Not in the Obit, Eat Breakfast	Nominated	

=== Grammy Awards ===
Year	Category	Nominated work	Result	Ref.
1960	Best Comedy Album	2000 Years with Carl Reiner and Mel Brooks	Nominated	
1961	Best Comedy Album	2001 Years with Carl Reiner and Mel Brooks	Nominated	
1963	Best Comedy Album	Carl Reiner and Mel Brooks at the Cannes Film Festival	Nominated	
1996	Best Spoken Word Album for Children	The Prince and the Pauper (Mark Twain)	Nominated	
1998	Best Comedy Album	The 2000 Year Old Man in the Year 2000	Won	
1999	Best Comedy Album	How Paul Robeson Saved My Life And Other Mostly Happy Stories	Nominated	
2001	Best Spoken Word Album	Letters From The Earth – Uncensored Writings By Mark Twain	Nominated	
2003	Best Spoken Word Album for Children	Tell Me A Scary Story	Nominated	

== Guild awards ==
=== Directors Guild of America ===
Year	Category	Nominated work	Result	Ref.
2007	Honorary Lifetime Achievement Award		Won	

=== Writers Guild of America ===
Year	Category	Nominated work	Result	Ref.
1963	Comedy/Variety writing	The Dick Van Dyke Show	Nominated	
1964	Comedy/Variety writing	The Dick Van Dyke Show	Nominated	
1964	Best Written American Comedy	The Thrill of It	Nominated	
1995	Laurel Award		Won	
2009	Valentine Davies Award		Won	

== Miscellaneous awards ==
=== MTV Movie Awards ===
Year	Category	Nominated work	Result	Ref.
2002	Best On-Screen Team	Ocean's Eleven	Nominated	

=== Phoenix Film Critics Society ===
Year	Category	Nominated work	Result	Ref.
2002	Best Acting Ensemble	Ocean's Eleven	Nominated	

=== Satellite Award ===
Year	Category	Nominated work	Result	Ref.
2002	Best Supporting Actor - Comedy/Musical	Ocean's Eleven	Nominated	

=== Saturn Awards ===
Year	Category	Nominated work	Result	Ref.
1978	Best Director	Oh, God!	Nominated	

=== Teen Choice Awards ===
Year	Category	Nominated work	Result	Ref.
2007	Choice Movie: Chemistry	Ocean's Thirteen	Nominated	

== Honors ==
- 1960 – Star on the Hollywood Walk of Fame, located at 6421 Hollywood Boulevard
- 1999 – Inducted into Television Hall of Fame
- 2000 – Received the Mark Twain Prize for American Humor at the Kennedy Center.
- 2017 – Carl and his son Rob Reiner became the first father-son duo to have their footprints and handprints added to a concrete slab at Grauman's Chinese Theater
