= George Gipe =

American novelist

- Born: February 3, 1933; Baltimore, Maryland, U.S.
- Died: September 6, 1986 (aged 53); Glendale, California, U.S.
- Writing career
- Language: English
- Genres: Screenwriting, fiction, nonfiction

George Gipe (February 3, 1933, Baltimore, Maryland – September 6, 1986, Glendale, California) was an American magazine writer, author and screenwriter. Gipe died at the age of 53 from an allergic reaction to a bee sting.

== Life ==
A native of Baltimore, in 1958 Gipe began working at WJZ-TV in Baltimore, working as a cameraman and set and production manager. He later joined WMAR-TV in Baltimore, where he won awards for documentaries and local programming.

His career as a writer began in 1967 with a non-fiction work called Nearer to the Dust: Copyright and the Machine, which anticipated several future legal issues surrounding computerized storage of copyrighted writing and information. Other non-fiction work followed; his only original novel, Coney Island Quickstep, was issued in 1977.

Gipe is chiefly remembered for his contributions to two screenplays: Dead Men Don't Wear Plaid (1982), and The Man With Two Brains (1983), both co-written with Carl Reiner and Steve Martin. He is also noted for his novelizations of several popular movies of the 1980s, including Melvin and Howard, Gremlins and Back to the Future.

Gipe was allergic to bee stings; on September 6, 1986, while in Glendale, California, he was stung by a bee. Gipe was pronounced dead on arrival at Verdugo Hills Medical Center in Glendale. He was 53 years old.

== Works ==
=== Novel ===
- Coney Island Quickstep (1977)

=== Novelizations ===
- Melvin and Howard (1980)
- Resurrection (1980)
- Gremlins (1984)
- Back to the Future (1985)
- Explorers (1985)

=== Short stories ===
- "The Cask of Amarillo Texas" (1969)

=== Nonfiction ===
- Nearer to the Dust: Copyright and the Machine (1967)
- The Great American Sports Book (1978)
- The Last Time When... (1982)

=== Screenplays ===
- Dead Men Don't Wear Plaid (1982) (co-written with Carl Reiner & Steve Martin)
- The Man with Two Brains (1983) (co-written with Carl Reiner & Steve Martin)
