= Estelle Reiner =

American actress and singer (1914–2008)

- Born: Estelle Lebost; June 5, 1914; New York City, U.S.
- Died: October 25, 2008 (aged 94); Beverly Hills, California, U.S.
- Occupations: Actress; singer
- Years active: 1960–1989
- Spouse: Carl Reiner (m. 1943)
- Children: Rob; Annie; Lucas

Estelle Reiner (née Lebost; June 5, 1914 – October 25, 2008) was an American actress and singer, described by The New York Times as "matriarch of one of the leading families in American comedy". She was the wife of Carl Reiner and the mother of Rob Reiner, Lucas Reiner, and Annie Reiner.

== Life and career ==
Reiner was born in the Bronx and graduated from James Monroe High School. She was a visual artist and met her future husband, Carl Reiner, while working in the Catskills, designing stage sets for hotel shows. She married Reiner in 1943, and had three children, Rob, Lucas and Annie. She was Jewish.

Carl Reiner's 1960s television comedy, The Dick Van Dyke Show, recapitulated his career writing for Sid Caesar, with Carl Reiner playing the Caesar character and Dick Van Dyke portraying Reiner's real-life job as a writer in the role of Rob Petrie. The re-creation was so complete that the Petries in the show lived on Bonnie Meadow Road in suburban New Rochelle, New York, the same street as the real-life Reiners. As described by Rob Reiner, "Basically he wrote his own life" in The Dick Van Dyke Show and that “my mother was Mary Tyler Moore".

In her 60s, Reiner became a cabaret singer and performed for decades until just a few years before her death. She studied the theatre with method acting pioneer Lee Strasberg and with Viola Spolin, the American Grandmother of Improvisation. She appeared in a number of film comedies, including with Dom DeLuise in the 1980 film Fatso, as Mrs. Goodman, and in the 1983 movies The Man with Two Brains with Steve Martin in the role "Tourist in Elevator" and in Mel Brooks' To Be or Not to Be as Gruba.

Reiner's most enduring film role was in 1989's When Harry Met Sally..., in which director Rob Reiner cast his mother as a customer in a scene with stars Billy Crystal and Meg Ryan at Katz's Delicatessen, in which Ryan fakes what was described as "a very public (and very persuasive) orgasm". Approached by a waitress after Ryan finishes, Reiner deadpans "I'll have what she's having". The line was ranked 33rd on the American Film Institute's list of the Top 100 movie quotations, just behind Casablanca's "Round up the usual suspects".

== Death ==
Reiner died of natural causes on October 25, 2008, in her home in Beverly Hills, California. She was 94.

== Partial filmography ==
- Fatso (1980) – Mrs. Goodman
- The Man with Two Brains (1983) – Tourist in Elevator
- To Be or Not to Be (1983) – Gruba
- Hot to Trot (1988) – Mrs. Goldblatt
- When Harry Met Sally... (1989) – Older Woman Customer (final film role)
