= Annie Reiner =

American writer (born 1949)

Sylvia Anne Reiner (/ˈraɪnər/; born May 11, 1949) is an American author, psychoanalyst, playwright, poet, and singer.

Her father was American producer, writer, and actor Carl Reiner, and her mother was actress Estelle Reiner (née Lebost). Her older brother was actor and director Rob Reiner, and her younger brother is artist Lucas Reiner.

== Bibliography ==
- A Visit to the Art Galaxy, Simon & Schuster (Juv) (1990) ISBN 0-671-74957-9
- The Potty Chronicles, A Story to Help Children Adjust to Toilet Training, Magination Press (1991) ISBN 0-945354-36-3
- This Nervous Breakdown is Driving Me Crazy: A Collection of Short Stories, Dove Books (1996) ISBN 0-7871-0707-7
- The Long Journey of the Little Seed, Dove Kids (1996) ISBN 0-7871-0469-8
- The Naked I, Red Dancefloor Press (1998), ISBN 1-881168-22-0
- Beyond Rhyme & Reason: Poems, Red Dancefloor Press (2002), ISBN 1-881168-15-8
- Bion and Being: Passion and the Creative Mind Routledge, (2012) ISBN 978-1855758544

== Audio ==
- Dancing in the Park, Audio Literature (1996) ISBN 0-7871-0991-6
- The History of Christmas, narrated by Jack Lemmon, Audio Literature; Har/Cas edition (1996) ISBN 0-7871-0500-7
