= Going for Broke (2003 film) =

2003 television drama film

- television advertisement poster
- Genre: Drama
- Written by: Deborah Serra
- Directed by: Graeme Campbell
- Starring: Delta Burke; Elliot Page (Note: Credited as Ellen Page.); Matthew Harbour; Francis X. McCarthy; Gerald McRaney
- Music by: Joseph Conlan
- Country of origin: United States
- Original language: English

Production
- Executive producers: Marian Brayton; Anne Carlucci
- Producer: Mychèle Boudrias
- Production locations: Montreal, Quebec, Canada
- Cinematography: Steve Danyluk
- Editor: James Bredin
- Running time: 86 minutes
- Production company: Brayton-Carlucci Productions

Original release
- Network: LMN
- Release: July 14, 2003

Going for Broke is a 2003 Canadian-American made-for-television drama film directed by Graeme Campbell and starring Delta Burke, Elliot Page, Matthew Harbour, Francis X. McCarthy and Gerald McRaney. It is based on the true story of former Juvenile Diabetes Foundation charity director Gina Garcia, who from 1993 to 1997 fraudulently issued cheques from the charity to herself in order to funnel money into her bank account for her compulsive gambling addiction, after which she was arrested, resulting in legislation that required that casinos and other gaming establishments in the state of Nevada have a telephone number posted for gambling addiction services.

The film was also notable for being one of Canadian Page's early American acting roles, before mainstream success in films such as Juno, Hard Candy and The Tracey Fragments.

== Plot ==
Laura Bancroft, a charity director, and her husband Jim move to Reno, Nevada, with their two children, Jennifer and Tommy. As a special treat, the family attends a restaurant that doubles as a casino, where Laura plays the slot machines with the encouragement of Jim and Bella, an elderly compulsive gambler who claims that her own habits are all just social in nature. After winning five hundred dollars, Laura becomes addicted to the restaurant's machines and soon begins spending much of her free time at the casino; meanwhile, she gets hired on as a director for a large medical charity and gets friendly local benefactor Brad Bradford to donate money and help recruit potential donors.

Increasingly unable to find time for her family as she juggles her career and her gambling habits, Laura misses Jennifer's school mother-daughter tea party and pawns Tommy's bicycle. She also neglects Jim, getting into frequent arguments with him when he accuses her of having a gambling problem. Laura continues to neglect her children, forgetting to feed them or pay the bills, only returning once to drop off a package of oatmeal that she bought for them with the last of her money (having blown most of her intended grocery money on the supermarket slot machines). Jennifer rebelliously adopts a goth lifestyle, takes up smoking and begins spending time with an older boyfriend, returning only to look after Tommy.

Laura later hits the jackpot on a video poker machine, receiving $50,000 and a free weekend in an expensive hotel room, but Jim is displeased, noting that his wife has pawned sentimental family items from his ancestors, as well as electronics belonging to the children. Laura reacts with hostility, separating from Jim and threatening to sue him if he files for custody of the children. Jim returns home to pick up his belongings and shares a tearful farewell with Jennifer and Tommy. For their safety, he drops off both children at their grandparents' house. Laura loses all of her jackpot winnings in one night and longs for more money. She begins stealing large amounts of money from the charity by writing fraudulent cheques, gambling this away, unbeknownst to Bradford or colleague Martine, who worry about her strange behaviour. Bella advises Laura to seek help after Laura begs her for an informal loan, telling Laura the only way to double her money in Reno is to "fold it over, and put it back in your pocket".

Jennifer's grandmother Lois encourages her granddaughter to break up with her boyfriend and stay in school, shocked that Laura fails to react at all to the news that underage Jennifer did not return home (having spent the night at a rave while drinking vodka). Things come to a head when tax auditor Ken Dowling arrives to do a random audit of the charity and discovers Laura's theft, while Laura has a panic attack in her office until Mr. Dowling and Martine start looking for her. Charged for fraud and facing bankruptcy as well, Laura returns to her empty house to face her mother, who tells her, "I don't know whether to hold you or slap you!" before the two break down and hug, crying together. Laura is sentenced to prison, while her parents, Jennifer, Tommy, Mr. Dowling and Martine all react bitterly to her pleas for forgiveness.

The film's epilogue reveals that the real "Laura Bancroft" (Garcia) was responsible for the enactment of legislation which addressing gambling addiction in Nevada during the time she was incarcerated.

== Cast ==
- Delta Burke as Laura Bancroft
- Elliot Page as Jennifer Bancroft
- Matthew Harbour as Tom "Tommy" Bancroft
- Gerald McRaney as Jim Bancroft
- Richard Jutras as Mr. Ken Dowling, the auditor
- Mary Donnelly Haskell as Martine
- Spiro Malandrakis (as "Spiro Maland") as Connor
- Joyce Gordon as Bella
- Raymond Stone as The Judge
- Patricia Gage as Grandma Lois Bancroft
- Francis X. McCarthy ( as "Francis-Xavier McCarthy") as Brad Bradford
- Norris Domingue as Grandpa Frank Bancroft

== Production ==
Although set in Reno, Nevada, Going For Broke was shot entirely in the city of Montreal, Quebec, Canada.

== Reception ==
Ben Stamos of FilmInk said of Going For Broke, "the Turner Classic Movie, Going for Broke, is a great example of a TV movie that is able to pull back the curtain on the realities of gambling addiction. As the movie progresses, the audience can see the mental strain wearing Laura down, her priorities changing from where they began at opening credits and the desperation that drives her to make worse and worse decisions." Going For Broke aired of the Lifetime Movie Network in the United States and various local stations in Canada, after which it was released to DVD video by Lifetime. A German edition of the film (English with German and Polish subtitles) was released to DVD by Paramount, where it appeared sporadically on Amazon. Bootleg uploads of the film continue to appear on YouTube, while it streams legitimately through Turner Classic Movies and continues to be sold on DVD.
