= Sanchez of Bel Air =

- Genre: Sitcom
- Created by: Dave Hackel; April Kelly
- Starring: Reni Santoni; Marcia Del Mar; Bobby Sherman; Alma Beltran; Richard Coca; Alitzah Wiener
- Composer: Michael Scott
- Country of origin: United States
- Original language: English
- No. of seasons: 1
- No. of episodes: 13

Production
- Executive producers: Dave Hackel; April Kelly
- Running time: 30 minutes
- Production companies: Dog Lips Productions; Paramount Television

Original release
- Network: USA Network
- Release: October 3 – December 26, 1986

Sanchez of Bel Air is an American sitcom that aired on USA Network from October 3 until December 26, 1986.

== Synopsis ==
In the early stages of the show, people began to relate it to The Beverly Hillbillies. This idea was rejected by the senior vice-president of programming, Frank Kelly. While it did have a similar theme of a 'change in fortune', they did not intend for it to be as drastic of a change as the older show had been. The Sanchez family's move would bring them into a new world of social politics. Their neighborhood was to include both "limousine liberals" and "ultra-conservatives".

The show's plot featured problems and hilarities that typical nuclear families would face. The show had two teenagers dealing with their bodily and social transformations that come with being that age. Another issue revolves around Rita, not enjoying having more time on her hands since she no longer has to work. Cultural issues come into play with the character Teresa, who has "no use for 'gringo food'".

== Production ==
In 1986, the USA Network partnered with Paramount Pictures for the first time to create a new sitcom, Sanchez of Bel Air. The series premiered on October 3 and ran for a single season of thirteen half-hour episodes, airing on Friday nights. The premise of the show follows the transition of a Hispanic-American family as they move from East Los Angeles, California, to the luxurious community of Bel Air. Sanchez of Bel Air was produced by David Hackel and April Kelly. While the show did not excel due to some content criticisms, it had one long-lasting effect: Sanchez of Bel Air was the foundation for the "Sanchez Formula" used to formulate residual amounts for television reruns.

=== Producers ===
Dave Hackel began his career in the media industry by writing for the television show Fish in 1978. He went on to create a well-established career in producing. His work included producing the hit shows Wings and Dear John. He has been a creative consultant on shows like Frasier and LateLine. Hackel also created the series The Pursuit of Happiness. April Kelly has had a career in media since being a writer on The Jim Stafford Show in 1975. Her most notable credit has been as the co-creator of the hit sitcom Boy Meets World, in the 1990s, and its reboot series, Girl Meets World, which premiered in 2014.

=== Cast ===
The Sanchez of Bel Air cast was composed almost entirely of Latinos and Latinas. Ricardo Sanchez, the father of the family and owner of a clothing company, "Buy Sanchez" is played by Reni Santoni. His wife, Rita Sanchez, is played by Marcia Del Mar. Their children, Gina and Miguel Sanchez, are played by Alitzah Weiner and Richard Coco. Teresa Sanchez, the grandmother of the family, is portrayed by Alma Beltran. It was appropriate that former musician, pop star, TV star, singer and teen idol, Bobby Sherman played the former musician Frankie Rondell, the Sanchez family's next door neighbor on this TV show.

== Episodes ==
No.	Title	Original release date
1	"Padre Knows Best"	October 3, 1986
2	"It's My Party and I'll Wear What I Want To"	October 10, 1986
3	"Blind Date"	October 17, 1986
4	"Spare the Hot Rod, Spoil the Child"	October 24, 1986
5	"Stolen Moments"	October 31, 1986
6	"Mi Casa Es Everybody's Casa"	November 7, 1986
7	"My Dinner with Frankie"	November 14, 1986
8	"Sis-Boom Sanchez"	November 21, 1986
9	"An Affair to Forget"	November 28, 1986
10	"The Idolmaker"	December 5, 1986
11	"Whatever Happened to Baby Jose?"	December 12, 1986
12	"Chez What?"	December 19, 1986
13	"It's Not My Job"	December 26, 1986

== Reception ==
=== Award nominations ===
Although the sitcom was short lived, and cut after its first season, it did have two award nominations. At the 9th Youth in Film Awards on December 5, 1987, hosted by the Youth In Film Association, Sanchez of Bel Air was nominated for the Best Cable Series category. Ultimately, it lost to The New Leave It to Beaver. At the same show Alitzah Wiener was nominated for Best Young Actress in a Cable Series or Special. Having the same fate as Sanchez of Bel Air, she lost to Kaleena Kiff of The New Leave It to Beaver.

=== Criticisms ===
The sitcom was under fire for its lack of authenticity to the Latino culture. This was attributed to the producers and the writers of the show being white non-Hispanics, although the main cast were Hispanic. Critics of the show believed that this inauthenticity resulted in a lack of humor among audiences.

== Sanchez Formula ==
Sanchez of Bel Air was a landmark show for the partnership of Paramount and Screen Actors Guild. It was the first basic cable show that had a contract for a residual agreement for reruns. The formula reached in this contract has served as a blanket for other contracts and is often referred to as the "Sanchez Formula". This formula is often compared to the "Hitchcock Formula" that is named after Alfred Hitchcock. In 2006, there was a crisis regarding the Screen Actors Guild rejecting their residuals contract. The reasoning behind this is that the contract were using the same formula for sixteen years without it being changed. The shows in question that were under negotiation The Shield on FX, Monk on USA Network, and The Closer on TNT. SAG threatened a strike if there was not a change in the residual amounts. With growing rates in the cable industry, they fought for higher pay. There has been a raise to 17% and the Sanchez Formula as of now looks like this:

For the seasons between May 2, 2014 and May 1, 2017, the breakdown of payable compensation is as follows:

Run	Percent of Applicable Minimum
2nd	17.0%
3rd	12.0%
4th	11.0%
5th	10.0%
6th	6.0%
7th & 8th	4.0%
9th & 10th	3.5%
11th	3.0%
12th	2.5%
13th & future runs	1.5%
