= Bert Rigby, You're a Fool =

1989 film by Carl Reiner

- Theatrical release poster
- Directed by: Carl Reiner
- Written by: Carl Reiner
- Produced by: George Shapiro
- Starring: Robert Lindsay; Robbie Coltrane; Jackie Gayle; Bruno Kirby; Corbin Bernsen; Anne Bancroft
- Cinematography: Jan de Bont
- Edited by: Bud Molin
- Music by: Ralph Burns
- Production company: Lorimar
- Distributed by: Warner Bros. Pictures
- Release date: February 24, 1989
- Running time: 94 minutes
- Country: United States
- Language: English
- Budget: $7 million
- Box office: $75,868

Bert Rigby, You're a Fool is a 1989 American musical film directed by Carl Reiner, and starring Robert Lindsay in the title role.

== Plot ==
Bert Rigby is a miner in a small dying town of Langmore in northern England, with aspirations to show business. He tells the story in flashback, while sitting in a bar. He lives with his mother, a musical fan, and next door to his sweetheart, Laurel Pennington. She lives above the pub where she works, and they have a bomb shelter straddling their back yards where they have secret meetings.

While his fellows are on strike once again, Bert decides to try his luck in show business. He gets his chance when he performs in an amateur show, singing "Isn't It Romantic?", and his first appearance on stage goes all wrong, when his nose starts bleeding after an injury sustained playing football - but the audience loves him anyway. So he starts as a comedian in a traveling amateur show for £50 a night, touring around the country with his manager, Sid Trample, and Sid's wife Tess. Bert repeats the act he did in his first appearance, until he tires of it and starts doing a Buster Keaton imitation. During the tour they come across a crew filming a contraceptives commercial.

One day Bert gets an offer from Kyle DeForest, an ad director from Hollywood who was in England filming a contraceptives commercial, and flies to the United States with Sid, expecting a great career and again leaving behind the pregnant Laurel. In Hollywood, Bert film a commercial with him playing Buster Keaton directed by DeForest but the ad is dropped when a demographic survey reveals that most of the target audience had never heard of Keaton. Bert discovers that Sid has left him high and dry, and stranded in America, they part ways.

Bert then works as a pizza deliveryman, where he encounters a group of thugs, and then as a nightclub comic, where he defends Jesus De Cordova, a Hispanic man, against a loutish patron. The grateful Jesus hires Bert to work as a tree pruner. There, he meets Meredith, the hot-to-trot wife of movie mogul I.I. Perlestein. When Bert is fired from the tree pruning job, he is then hired by Perlestein to work as a servant in their house and as a technical advisor to Jim Shirley, a caddish Hollywood star who is playing a Briton in a film. While fending off the advances of Meredith, Bert forms a bond with Shirley's son Jim Jr. Bert phones Laurel, and during their conversation, he has a dream where he sings "Dream a Little Dream of Me" to her. The Perlesteins have a dinner party at their house, with Bert acting as the servant. The party becomes a disaster when a curtain hiding a priceless masterpiece is set on fire.

The flashback ends, and the bartender tells Bert that the person he has been telling his story to does not speak English. Bert then dances in the bar, which catches the attention of an ad producer. Bert eventually returns to England in triumph, with a showing of his song-and-dance White Gold beer commercial in the town theatre. The commercial is followed by Bert doing a rendition of "Puttin' on the Ritz".

== Cast ==
- Robert Lindsay as Bert Rigby
  - Ian Hawks as Young Bert Rigby
- Robbie Coltrane as Sid Trample
- Cathryn Bradshaw as Laurel Pennington
- Jackie Gayle as I.I. Perlestein
- Bruno Kirby as Kyle DeForest
- Corbin Bernsen as Jim Shirley
- Anne Bancroft as Meredith Perlestein
- Carmen du Sautoy as Tess Trample
- Liz Smith as Mrs. Rigby
  - Diana Weston as Young Mrs. Rigby
- Lila Kaye as Mrs. Pennington
- Santos Morales as Jesus De Cordova
- Mike Grady as Mick O'Grady
- Fanny Carby as Aunt Aggie
- George Wallace as Bartender
- Gela Nash as Mona Ridando
- Israel Juarbe as Bellhop
- Julie Ow as Cashier
- Ben Ryan Ganger as Jim Shirley Jr.
- Frank Lugo as Bar Patron
- Deborah Geffner as Dancer

== Reception ==
Janet Maslin gave the film a mixed review in The New York Times, saying "the film that Carl Reiner has fashioned around Mr. Lindsay's music-loving mineworker, is extremely odd. Its pace isn't quick. Its point isn't clear. Its satire is so gentle that it hardly has a target. Its only guiding sentiment is a loose, soft-hearted affection for a certain kind of show-business magic." Anne Bancroft earned a nomination for the Golden Raspberry Award for Worst Supporting Actress for her performance in the film at the 10th Golden Raspberry Awards.
