= The Man with Two Brains =

1983 film by Carl Reiner

- Theatrical release poster
- Directed by: Carl Reiner
- Written by: Steve Martin; Carl Reiner; George Gipe
- Produced by: William E. McEuen; David V. Picker
- Starring: Steve Martin; Kathleen Turner; David Warner
- Cinematography: Michael Chapman
- Edited by: Bud Molin
- Music by: Joel Goldsmith
- Production company: Aspen Film Society
- Distributed by: Warner Bros. Pictures
- Release date: June 3, 1983
- Running time: 90 minutes
- Country: United States
- Language: English
- Box office: $10 million

The Man with Two Brains is a 1983 American science fiction black comedy film directed by Carl Reiner and starring Steve Martin and Kathleen Turner.

Written by Reiner, Martin, and George Gipe (who previously worked together on 1982's Dead Men Don't Wear Plaid) and shot in summer 1982 at Laird International Studios in Culver City, California, the film is a broad comedy, with Martin starring as Dr. Michael Hfuhruhurr, a pioneering neurosurgeon with a cruel and unfaithful new wife, Dolores Benedict (Turner).

== Plot ==
Dr. Michael Hfuhruhurr, a widowed brain surgeon, is renowned for inventing a method of "cranial screw-top" brain surgery. He saves the life of Dolores Benedict, a gold-digging femme fatale who is accidentally run over by Michael when fleeing the scene of her latest husband's fatal coronary, caused by her malicious mind-games and scheming. As she recovers, Michael falls in love and they marry. Dolores torments Michael by pretending to be too ill to consummate the marriage. On a honeymoon and business trip to a medical conference in Vienna, a city living in fear of the serial "Elevator Killer", Hfuhruhurr meets mad scientist Dr. Alfred Necessiter, who has created a technique enabling him to store living brains in liquid-filled jars using the Elevator Killer's victims.

Michael discovers he can communicate telepathically with one of Necessiter's brains, that of Anne Uumellmahaye, when they both sing Under the Bamboo Tree. Michael and Anne fall in love, with Michael taking her brain away to spend more time with her. Dolores—having learned that Michael has received a large inheritance—attempts to reignite their relationship, but catches on to his relationship with Anne when she spots him in a rowboat with the jar. She attempts to kill Anne first by leaving her out in the sun, then by putting her brain in an oven.

Michael consults with Necessiter, who informs him that brains in tanks do not survive long, with Anne being his longest-living one to date. Necessiter recommends transplanting Anne's brain into a body of a recently deceased woman. Filling a syringe with window cleaner, the substance used by the Elevator Killer, Michael sees a crowd gathering around an attractive woman hit by a car. Michael is hoping she will expire, only to see her regain consciousness. He then targets Fran, a prostitute, but his conscience stops him. Stepping into an elevator, he finds that Dolores has just been murdered by the Elevator Killer, who turns out to be Merv Griffin. Michael takes Dolores' corpse, and Griffin promises to turn himself in to the police.

Michael takes Dolores's body to Necessiter's lab. He is stopped by the Austrian police, who suspect him of drunk driving. After a series of unusual sobriety tests, Michael convinces the police of his sobriety. However, as Dolores' body flails, the police realize that she was not drunk but dead and pursue his car. Michael makes it to the lab, where Necessiter transfers Anne's consciousness to Dolores's body, which is viewed by the stunned policemen. In the process, Michael is electrically shocked by the equipment and falls into a coma.

Waking up six weeks later, Michael meets Anne in Dolores's body. Anne is a compulsive eater and has gained considerable weight in her new body. Michael loves Anne for who she is, and they get married. A note in the credits reports that Merv Griffin did not turn himself in as promised and requests that the audience report the whereabouts of Griffin if they see him.

== Cast ==
- Steve Martin as Dr. Michael Hfuhruhurr
- Kathleen Turner as Dolores Benedict
- David Warner as Dr. Alfred Necessiter
- Paul Benedict as Dr. Necessiter's butler
- George Furth as Timon
- Peter Hobbs as Dr. Brandon
- Earl Boen as Dr. Felix Conrad
- Randi Brooks as Fran
- James Cromwell as realtor
- Francis X. McCarthy as Olsen (as Frank McCarthy)
- Estelle Reiner as tourist in elevator
- Merv Griffin as himself
- Jeffrey Combs as Dr. Jones
- Sissy Spacek as voice of Anne Uumellmahaye (Uncredited)

== Production ==
=== Filming ===
Kathleen Turner describes the scene from this film in which her character "is about to have her ass rubbed" as the only sex scene of her career for which she used a body double.

== Reception ==
On Rotten Tomatoes the film has an approval rating of 80% based on reviews from 25 critics. The site's consensus states "As spastically uneven as its zany title suggests, The Man with Two Brains isn't peak Steve Martin – but it's still often close enough to enjoy." On Metacritic the film has a score of 61 out of 100 based on 9 critic reviews, indicating "generally favorable reviews".

Roger Ebert gave the film 2 out of 4 stars and wrote that despite the fact that he "never found Steve Martin irresistibly funny" ... "it's a tribute to "The Man With Two Brains" that I found myself laughing a fair amount of the time, despite my feelings about Martin."
