= Dead Men Don't Wear Plaid =

1982 film by Carl Reiner

- Theatrical release poster
- Directed by: Carl Reiner
- Written by: Carl Reiner; George Gipe; Steve Martin
- Produced by: William E. McEuen; David V. Picker; Richard F. McWhorter (associate producer)
- Starring: Steve Martin; Rachel Ward; Reni Santoni; Carl Reiner
- Cinematography: Michael Chapman
- Edited by: Bud Molin
- Music by: Miklós Rózsa; Steve Goodman
- Production company: Aspen Film Society
- Distributed by: Universal Pictures
- Release date: May 21, 1982
- Running time: 88 minutes
- Country: United States
- Language: English
- Budget: $9 million
- Box office: $18.2 million

Dead Men Don't Wear Plaid is a 1982 American neo-noir comedy-mystery film, directed by Carl Reiner and starring Steve Martin, Rachel Ward and Reiner. Co-written by Reiner, Martin & George Gipe, the film is both a parody of and an homage to film noir and the pulp detective films of the 1940s. The title refers to Martin's character telling a story of a woman obsessed with plaid, a scene which was ultimately cut from the film.

Edited by Bud Molin, Dead Men Don't Wear Plaid is partly a collage film, incorporating clips from 19 vintage films. They are combined with new footage of Martin and other actors similarly shot in black-and-white, with the result that the original dialogue and acting of the classic films become part of a completely different story.

Among the actors who appear from classic films are Ingrid Bergman, Humphrey Bogart, James Cagney, Joan Crawford, Bette Davis, Brian Donlevy, Kirk Douglas, Ava Gardner, Cary Grant, Alan Ladd, Veronica Lake, Burt Lancaster, Charles Laughton, Fred MacMurray, Ray Milland, Edmond O'Brien, Vincent Price, Barbara Stanwyck, and Lana Turner.

Dead Men Don't Wear Plaid was the final film for both costume designer Edith Head and composer Miklós Rózsa.

== Plot ==
Juliet Forrest, daughter of scientist and cheesemaker John Forrest, asks private investigator Rigby Reardon to investigate her father's death. Searching Dr. Forrest's lab, Rigby finds two lists, "Friends of Carlotta" (FOC) and "Enemies of Carlotta" (EOC), and an autographed photo of singer Kitty Collins, whose name appears on one of the lists. A man shoots Rigby in the arm and takes the lists.

Rigby finds his way to Juliet's house, where she sucks out the bullet. Juliet also reveals a note to her father from her brother-in-law, Sam Hastings, which reveals that Dr. Forrest gave Sam a dollar bill "for safekeeping". When Juliet mentions her cleaning woman, Rigby goes berserk due to his father running off with his cleaning woman and Rigby's mother dying of a broken heart.

Rigby tracks down Sam and gets Dr. Forrest's dollar, which has FOC names scrawled on it — including Kitty and her boyfriend Swede Anderson. Rigby tracks down Kitty, asking her whether she is one of Carlotta's friends, which causes her to leave. He trails her to a restaurant, where she ditches her brooch into her soup. Rigby retrieves the brooch, which contains an EOC list on which all names are crossed out except Swede Anderson's. Rigby visits Swede, but Swede is killed. Rigby is shot in the same arm as before, requiring Juliet to suck out another bullet. Rigby calls his mentor Philip Marlowe for assistance. Juliet hands over a key from Dr. Forrest's desk and a key to train station locker 1936. Marlowe picks up the EOC list to check for unsolved murders.

Rigby goes to the train station locker, which contains more lists. He finds F.X. Huberman, whose name was on one of the lists, throwing a party. She flirts with Rigby, then drugs his drink and steals the locker key. Juliet finds Rigby and informs him that Sam fell from a window reaching for a bottle of whiskey. She has an article from The New York Times about a cruise ship called Immer Essen; Sam Hastings was a passenger. When Marlowe calls, Rigby questions him about Walter Neff, the ship's owner, and learns that Neff cruises supermarkets for blondes.

Rigby disguises himself as a woman and meets Neff. Rigby drugs him and finds a passenger manifest for the Immer Essen identical to an EOC list and articles about the ship's imprisoned captain, Cody Jarrett, who refuses to talk to anyone but his mother. Rigby dresses up as Jarrett's mother to visit Jarrett. He tries winning Jarrett's confidence, explaining that the FOC are after him. When that fails, Rigby impersonates a prisoner. Jarrett turns out to be a FOC and shoots Rigby.

After sucking out a third bullet, Juliet leaves for the drugstore. Marlowe informs Rigby that Carlotta is an island off Peru. At a cafe, Rigby finds Kitty. Carlos, a policeman, warns Rigby of the locals, including Kitty's new boyfriend, Rice. The next day, one of the locals approaches Rigby and tries to bribe him into leaving the island.

Kitty drops by Rigby's room. Carlos is telling him Rice is in town with a group of Germans when the telephone line is cut. Kitty drugs Rigby's drink, and he wakes up to find Rice choking him. After a chase, Rigby shoots Rice and frisks the corpse, leading him to a hideout where he finds Juliet, her father still alive, and her butler, Field Marshal Wilfried von Kluck.

Dr. Forrest divulged a secret cheese mold to Nazis posing as a humanitarian organization. Once he discovered their intention to use the mold's corrosive properties to destroy America with strategically placed cheese bombs, he assembled a list of Nazi agents, the FOC. Before he could divulge the names to the FBI, he was abducted and his death faked to prevent a police investigation. The Immer Essen, a cruise ship passing by, witnessed the mold tests, making all passengers EOC. Rigby is captured but Juliet gets Wilfried to say "cleaning woman", causing Rigby to go berserk, break his chains and overpower the Nazis. While Juliet gets Rodriguez, Wilfried pulls one of the switches, destroying Terre Haute, Indiana, before being killed by Rigby. Rodriguez rounds up the other Nazis while Rigby shares a kiss with Juliet.

== Cast ==
- Steve Martin as Rigby Reardon
- Rachel Ward as Juliet Forrest
- George Gaynes as Dr. John Hay Forrest
- Reni Santoni as Carlos Rodriguez
- Adrian Ricard as Mildred
- Carl Reiner as Field Marshal Wilfried Von Kluck
- Francis X. McCarthy as Waiter
- Gene LeBell as Hood
- Cheryl Smith as Veronica Lake (uncredited)

=== Archive footage (in order of appearance) ===
- Alan Ladd as The Exterminator
- Barbara Stanwyck as Leona Hastings-Forrest
- Ray Milland as Sam Hastings
- Ava Gardner as Kitty Collins
- Burt Lancaster as "Swede" Anderson
- Humphrey Bogart as Philip Marlowe
- Cary Grant as The Handsome Guy
- Ingrid Bergman as F.X. Huberman
- Veronica Lake as Monica Stillpond
- Bette Davis as Doris Devermont
- Lana Turner as Jimmi Sue Altfeld
- Edward Arnold as Jimmi Sue's Father
- Kirk Douglas as Lead Thug
- Fred MacMurray as Walter Neff
- James Cagney as Captain Cody Jarrett
- Joan Crawford as Margaret
- Charles Laughton as The Fat One Who Sweats a Lot
- Vincent Price as Rice

== Production ==
In mid-1980, comedian Steve Martin was having lunch with director Carl Reiner and screenwriter George Gipe. They were also discussing a screenplay Martin had written when he suggested that they use a clip from an old film. From this suggestion came the idea of using all sorts of clips from films throughout the entire feature. The three men left the lunch thinking about how they could incorporate all of these old clips into a story. Reiner planned to work Martin into the old footage via over-the-shoulder shots so that it looked like the comedian was talking to these vintage actors, a strategy used effectively several times in the film. In one scene, trick photography makes it appear that Martin is in the same shot (not over-the-shoulder) as Cary Grant in a clip from Suspicion. Reiner and Gipe spent countless hours looking through classic films for specific shots and "listening for a line that was ambiguous enough but had enough meat in it to contribute a line". They took lines of dialogue from clips they wanted to use and juxtaposed them while also trying to write a story based on them. Reiner and Gipe finally worked out a story and then met with Martin, who contributed some funny material of his own.

Martin purposely chose not to watch any classic films noir because he "didn't want to act like Humphrey Bogart … I didn't want to be influenced". The filmmakers enlisted some of the people that helped define many of the classic films from the 1940s. Costume designer Edith Head created over 20 suits for Martin in similar fashion to those worn by Cary Grant and James Stewart. Production designer John DeCuir, a veteran with 40 years of experience, designed 85 sets for the ten-week shooting schedule. Director of photography Michael Chapman studied the angles and lighting popular among '40s film noir, conducting six months of research with Technicolor to try to match the old film clips with his new footage.

Principal photography began on July 7, 1981, with the bulk of the shooting done on soundstages of Laird International Studios in Culver City and three exterior locations shot in and around Los Angeles. Martin usually acted opposite actors dressed exactly like the classic movie stars he was interacting with so that he had someone he could talk to and who would respond to his lines.

Edith Head died two weeks after finishing her work on this film. A dedication honoring her appears before the film's end credits.

== Films used ==
The following films were used in Dead Men Don't Wear Plaid. Five films were already owned by Universal, and the rest were licensed from other studios. Of the five films owned by Universal, four were originally owned by Paramount. Note that some of the film license owners have changed since the original release of the films.

=== Universal ===
- This Gun for Hire (1942)
- The Glass Key (1942)
- Double Indemnity (1944)
- The Lost Weekend (1945)
- The Killers (1946)

=== Warner Bros.* ===
- Deception (1946)
- Humoresque (1946)
- The Big Sleep (1946)
- Dark Passage (1947)
- White Heat (1949)

*At the time of release, United Artists owned these films.

=== Metro-Goldwyn-Mayer** ===
- Johnny Eager (1941)
- Keeper of the Flame (the car wreck scene) (1943) (uncredited)
- The Postman Always Rings Twice (1946)
- The Bribe (1949)

**These films are now owned by Warner Bros. as a result of their 1996 acquisition of Turner Entertainment Co., who owned the rights since 1986.

=== RKO Pictures*** ===
- Suspicion (1941)
- Notorious (1946)

*** Suspicion is now owned by Warner Bros. as a result of their 1996 acquisition of Turner Entertainment Co., who owned the rights since 1986. Notorious is now owned by Walt Disney Studios Motion Pictures as a result of their 1996 acquisition of American Broadcasting Company, who owned the rights to most of the films produced by David O. Selznick.

=== Paramount Pictures ===
- I Walk Alone (1947)
- Sorry, Wrong Number (1948)

=== Columbia Pictures ===
- In a Lonely Place (1950)

== Critical reception ==
On the review aggregator website Rotten Tomatoes, 71% of 28 critics' reviews are positive. The website's consensus reads: "Dead Men Don't Wear Plaid is more elaborate pastiche than uproarious comedy, but the farce works thanks to the sly lampooning of Hollywood noir and Steve Martin's performance as a goofy gumshoe." Metacritic which uses a weighted average, assigned the film a score of 67 out of 100, based on 13 critics, indicating "generally favorable" reviews.

In his review for Newsweek magazine, David Ansen wrote, "A one joke movie? Perhaps, but it's such an engaging joke that anyone who loves old movies will find it irresistible. And anyone who loves Steve Martin will be fascinated by his sly performance, which is pitched exactly between the low comedy of The Jerk and the highbrow Brechtianisms of Pennies from Heaven." Vincent Canby's review for The New York Times praised Martin's performance: "the film has an actor who's one of America's best sketch artists, a man blessed with a great sense of timing, who is also self-effacing enough to meet the most cockeyed demands of the material." Time magazine's Richard Corliss wrote, "The gag works for a while, as Martin weaves his own plot-web into the 18 old movies, but pretty soon he's traveling on old good will and flop sweat."

== See also ==
- Kung Pow! Enter the Fist, which has a similar concept
- La Classe américaine
- Postmodernist film
- The Staggering Stories of Ferdinand de Bargos
- What's Up, Tiger Lily?, the first film in this style
