= Trump derangement syndrome =

Pejorative term used to describe negative reactions to President Donald Trump

Trump derangement syndrome (TDS) is a pejorative term used to describe negative reactions to U.S. president Donald Trump to characterize them as irrational and disconnected from Trump's actual policy positions. The term has mainly been used by Trump supporters to discredit criticism of him, as a way of reframing the discussion by suggesting that his opponents are incapable of accurately perceiving the world. Some journalists have used the term to call for restraint when judging Trump's statements and actions. The term has also been co-opted to criticize the loyalty of Trump's supporters.

== Origin of the term ==
The origin of the term is traced to Charles Krauthammer, a conservative political columnist, commentator, and psychiatrist, who coined the phrase Bush derangement syndrome in 2003 during the presidency of George W. Bush. That "syndrome" was defined by Krauthammer as "the acute onset of paranoia in otherwise normal people in reaction to the policies, the presidency—nay—the very existence of George W. Bush".

Similarly, conservative activist David Horowitz used the phrase "Obama derangement syndrome" to compare "over-the-top hysteria" in the criticism offered by sections of the right-wing commentariat regarding Barack Obama following the latter's election as president to Bush derangement syndrome, citing comparisons of Obama to Stalin, David Koresh, Charles Manson and Saddam Hussein, although Krauthammer disagreed with Horowitz's use of the phrase. Horowitz particularly applied the phrase to those who advocated "birtherist" conspiracy theories that claimed Obama was not a native-born United States citizen.

Ezra Klein has argued that while those accused of Bush derangement syndrome were inspired by opposition to Bush's policies, those accused of Obama Derangement Syndrome were driven by reactions to Obama as an individual, in particular his race and Kenyan heritage, and a feeling among some conservatives that these made him un-American.

The first use of the term Trump derangement syndrome may have been by Esther Goldberg in an August 2015 op-ed in The American Spectator; she applied the term to "Ruling Class Republicans" who are dismissive or contemptuous of Trump. Krauthammer, in an op-ed commented that—in addition to general hysteria about Trump—the "Trump Derangement Syndrome" was the "inability to distinguish between legitimate policy differences and ... signs of psychic pathology".

According to The Independent, "the highly-politicized term" was coined to dismiss criticism of Trump in his first term as liberal hysteria, suggesting that people abandon all logic and reason due to their dislike of the president.

== Definition ==
Fareed Zakaria defined the term as "hatred of President Trump so intense that it impairs people's judgment". CNN's editor-at-large Chris Cillizza called TDS "the preferred nomenclature of Trump defenders who view those who oppose him and his policies as nothing more than the blind hatred of those who preach tolerance and free speech". Pointing to previous allegations of Bush derangement syndrome and Obama derangement syndrome, Cillizza suggested, "Viewed more broadly, the rise of presidential derangement syndromes is a function of increased polarization—not to mention our national self-sorting—at work in the country today." Bret Stephens has described the term as something used by conservative groups whenever someone speaks out critically against Trump, regardless of political affiliation.

CNN political analyst John Avlon uses the term in a more generalized sense inclusive of positive emotions as well as hatred towards Trump, so that for example, TDS accounts for denialism about Trump's defeat in the 2020 election, as a "political diagnosis" of people who "simply can't accept the fact that he lost the election". This new definition derogatorily describing the nature of Trump supporters rather than his deriders has been used by several journalists.

Politico co-founder John Harris wrote that TDS is related to gaslighting, "another psychological concept in vogue in the Trump era".

== Usage ==
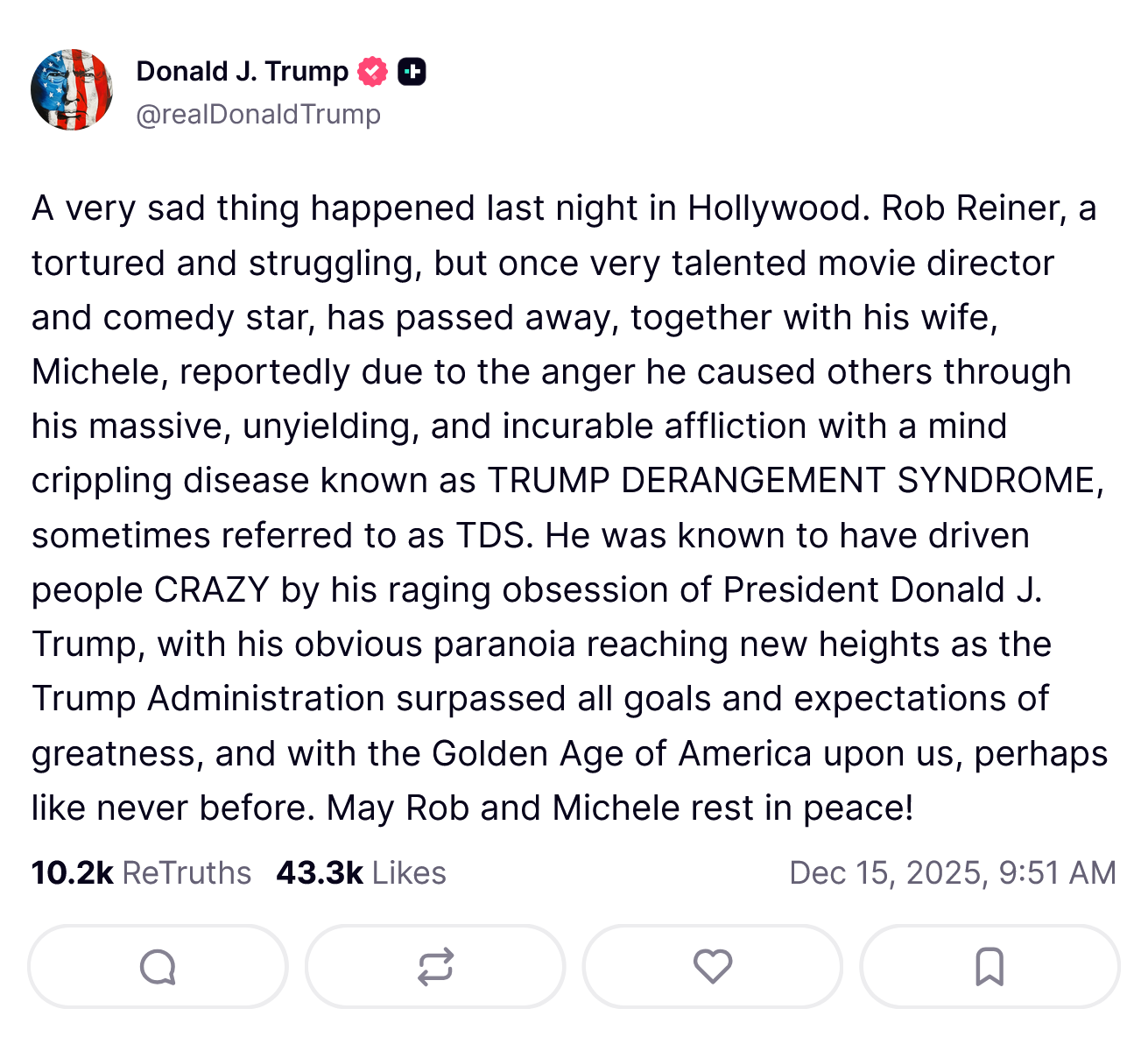
Following the death of Rob Reiner in 2025, Trump suggested he died for having Trump derangement syndrome and described it as a "mind crippling disease".

The term has been widely applied by pro-Trump writers towards critics of Trump, accusing them of responding negatively to a wide range of Trump's statements and actions.

The use of the term has been called part of a broader strategy by the Republican Party to discredit criticisms of Trump's actions, as a way of "reframing" the discussion by suggesting his political opponents are incapable of accurately perceiving the world. However, according to Kathleen Hall Jamieson of Annenberg Public Policy Center, the term could backfire on Trump supporters because people might interpret it to mean that Trump is the one who is "deranged", rather than those who criticize him.

Some Trump supporters have asserted that he plays a form of "multi-dimensional chess" on a mental level his critics cannot comprehend, which they say explains why critics are frustrated and confused by Trump's words and actions. Fox News anchor Bret Baier and former Speaker of the U.S. House of Representatives Paul Ryan have characterized Trump as a "troll" who makes controversial statements to see his adversaries' "heads explode".

The term has been used by journalists critical of Trump to call for restraint. Fareed Zakaria, who urged Americans to vote against Trump calling him a "cancer on American democracy", argues that every Trump policy "cannot axiomatically be wrong, evil and dangerous". Adam Gopnik, who takes a strong anti-Trump position, responded to these assertions that it is a "huge and even fatal mistake for liberals (and constitutional conservatives) to respond negatively to every Trump initiative, every Trump policy, and every Trump idea". Arguing that Trump's opponents must instead recognize that the real problem is "Deranged Trump Self-Delusion", Gopnik defined the "Syndrome" as President Trump's "daily spasm of narcissistic gratification and episodic vanity".

Trump and his top communication advisers, including White House press secretary Karoline Leavitt and communications director Steven Cheung, have repeatedly accused many critics of having a "severe case of Trump Derangement Syndrome". The phrase has also been used by Republican politicians and talk show hosts. Newsweek was also accused of suffering from TDS by Cheung. Democrats and others have contended that it is not a legitimate condition, and no clinical data supports its existence and that instead, it is a label used to dismiss criticism of him. Some point out that TDS may also apply to die-hard Trump supporters who defend him unquestioningly without any regard for facts or consequences.

=== Examples of use ===
==== 2018 ====
Senator Rand Paul has cited the so-called syndrome several times. In a July 16, 2018, interview he said investigators should simply focus on election security and stop "accusing Trump of collusion with the Russians and all this craziness that's not true"—accusations which he said were entirely motivated by "Trump derangement syndrome".

Trump used the term in a tweet following the 2018 Russia–United States Summit in Helsinki: "Some people HATE the fact that I got along well with President Putin of Russia. They would rather go to war than see this. It's called Trump Derangement Syndrome!" He also used it in a tweet about Alan Dershowitz's book The Case Against Impeaching Trump: ".@AlanDersh, a brilliant lawyer, who although a Liberal Democrat who probably didn't vote for me, has discussed the Witch Hunt with great clarity and in a very positive way. He has written a new and very important book called 'The Case Against Impeaching Trump', which I would encourage all people with Trump Derangement Syndrome to read!"

In July 2018, Jeanine Pirro was a guest on The View to promote her newly published book Liars, Leakers, and Liberals: The Case Against the Anti-Trump Conspiracy. While she was responding to a question about how the "deep state" really works, she accused co-host Whoopi Goldberg of suffering from Trump derangement syndrome. That same month, Eric Zorn wrote in the Chicago Tribune that the syndrome afflicts Trump's supporters more than his critics, as "what Team Trump is calling derangement is, in most cases, rational concern about his behavior and the direction he's taking the country.... The true Trump Derangement Syndrome loose on the land is the delusion suffered by those who still think he's going to make this country a better place for average people."

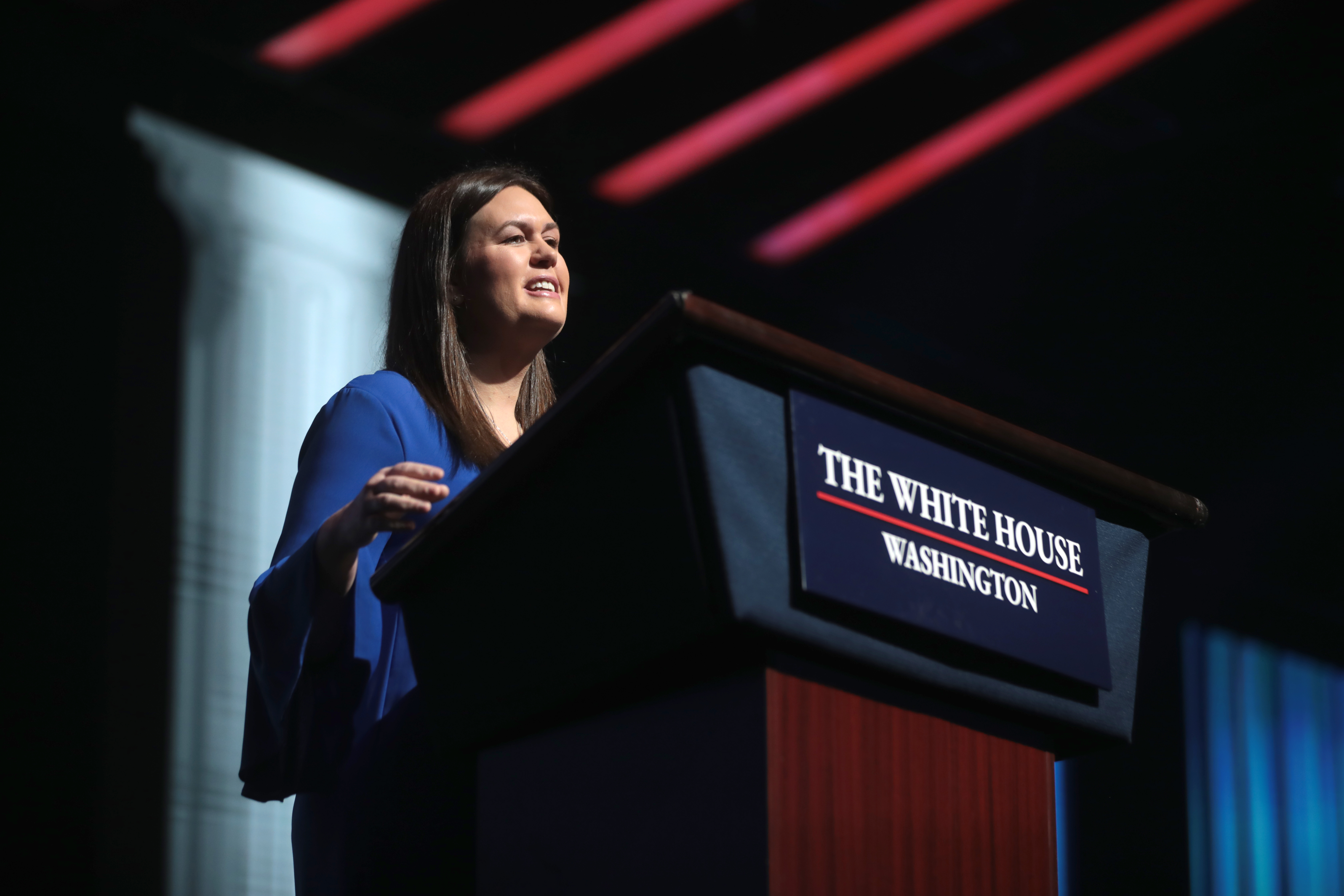
Sarah Huckabee Sanders, White House Press Secretary in the first Trump administration, made use of the term online.

In August 2018, Trump White House Press Secretary Sarah Huckabee Sanders used the term in a tweet: "Trump Derangement Syndrome is becoming a major epidemic among Democrats. Instead of freaking out about the booming Trump economy why not celebrate it?"

In September 2018, Fox News personality and Trump supporter Sean Hannity criticized The Washington Post as having Trump derangement syndrome for stating in an editorial that Trump, because of his attitude toward climate change, is "complicit" in hurricanes battering the United States; Hannity said, "it is now a full-blown psychosis, it is a psychological level of unhingement I have never seen."

==== 2019 ====
In March 2019, Bill Maher on Real Time with Bill Maher noted that while most statements by Trump were worthy of contempt, on occasions he had made perfectly sensible comments which were pilloried without justification. A case in point was Trump's criticism of the overengineering which led to the Boeing 737 MAX crashes and his preference for products to be simpler to use, which some commentators interpreted as evidence of conservative leanings.

In August 2019, Anthony Scaramucci, Trump's former White House Communications Director, said in interviews with Vanity Fair and CNN that he had "Trump fatigue syndrome" instead of Trump derangement syndrome.

In September 2019, Sean Hannity characterized as "Trump derangement syndrome" the continuing press coverage of Trump's days-long insistence that he was correct to state on September 1 that Hurricane Dorian posed a danger to Alabama, asserting "pretty much every newsroom in America screwed this up and lied to you", adding there were "a lot of psychotic jackasses in the media mob".

==== 2024 ====
The term resurfaced in 2024 concerning reactions to Trump's 2024 presidential campaign and eventual defeat of Vice President Kamala Harris. In October 2024, Bill Maher, expressing his concerns regarding a second Trump term stated, "It's not deranged to fear this! It's not deranged to find this alarming!" A House Democrat stated following the election that the Democratic Party needed to "get past this idea they call 'Trump Derangement Syndrome'".

In October 2024, Trump dismissed his former chief of staff John F. Kelly as having TDS after he branded the president as a fascist and made damaging claims about his views of Adolf Hitler.

In February 2025, Elon Musk revived the term and told Fox News host Sean Hannity he used to be "adored by the left" until they were infected with TDS. He added that when he mentioned the president's name at a dinner party before his return to the White House, "it was like they got shot with a dart in the jugular that contained like methamphetamine and rabies".

During the Signalgate scandal, Trump angrily criticized U.S. District Judge James Boasberg, calling him "disgraceful" and accused him of suffering from a "MASSIVE" Trump derangement syndrome, among other things, after the judge was assigned to oversee the case involving the chats which according to him is statistically impossible.

==== 2025 ====
Trump severely criticized four "disloyal" Republican Senators Mitch McConnell, Susan Collins, Lisa Murkowski, and Rand Paul who indicated they will join Democrats in voting for a joint resolution to end the national emergency declared by him to undo Trump tariffs on Canada, calling them "extremely difficult" and implored them to "get on the Republican bandwagon" and remain loyal to their party. He so wrote, "Why are they allowing Fentanyl to pour into our Country unchecked, and without penalty. What is wrong with them, other than suffering from Trump Derangement Syndrome, commonly known as TDS?" in the overnight Truth Social post.

In June 2025, during the height of Trump's feud with his ex-DOGE chief, Elon Musk, Trump suggested that Musk "is suffering from 'Trump derangement syndrome.'"

In December 2025, following the killing of Rob and Michele Reiner, Trump suggested in a Truth Social post that Rob Reiner's death was caused by anger toward his "Trump derangement syndrome". The post triggered bipartisan backlash.

On April 2, 2026, two days following the first show of Bruce Springsteen and the E Street Band's Land of Hope and Dreams American Tour, a tour Springsteen launched in response to Trump, the president took to Truth Social to heavily criticize the musician by saying that he looked like a "dried up prune who has suffered greatly from the work of a really bad plastic surgeon, has long had a horrible and incurable case of Trump Derangement Syndrom, sometimes referred to as TDS". He also urged his supporters to boycott Springsteen's concerts.

=== Proposed laws ===
A group of Minnesota Senate Republicans introduced a bill in March 2025 that seeks to classify "Trump Derangement Syndrome" as a mental illness and incorporate it into the state's legal definition through amended statutes. The bill has proposed that the "syndrome" as the "acute onset of paranoia in otherwise normal persons that is in reaction to the policies and presidencies of President Donald J. Trump" which should be recognized in legal and medical contexts. The bill also states that the symptoms may include "Trump-induced general hysteria, which produces an inability to distinguish between legitimate policy differences and signs of psychic pathology in President Donald Trump's behavior" which can manifest as "intense verbal hostility toward Trump" and "overt acts of aggression and violence" towards Trump and MAGA supporters. The Minnesota bill uses the same wording that Krauthammer used to describe Bush derangement syndrome.

U.S. Representative Warren Davidson of Ohio introduced a bill in May 2025 that would require the National Institutes of Health to study Trump derangement syndrome and report annually to Congress. Davidson said "TDS has divided families, the country, and led to nationwide violence—including two assassination attempts on President Trump. The TDS Research Act would require the NIH to study this toxic state of mind, so we can understand the root cause and identify solutions."

== See also ==
- Ad hominem
- Goldwater rule
- Political abuse of psychiatry
- Sluggish schizophrenia
- Trumpism
- Woke mind virus, a phrase popularized by Elon Musk
