= Dominion Voting Systems v. Fox News Network =

2021 defamation lawsuit in the US

- Court: Delaware Superior Court
- Full case name: US Dominion, Inc., Dominion Voting Systems, Inc., and Dominion Voting Systems Corporation v. Fox News Network, LLC; US Dominion, Inc., Dominion Voting Systems, Inc., and Dominion Voting Systems Corporation v. Fox Corporation
- Citation: N21C-03-257; N21C-11-082

Court membership
- Judge sitting: Eric M. Davis

Keywords
- Libel; Defamation; Actual malice

Dominion Voting Systems v. Fox News Network (colloquially Dominion v. Fox) was a U.S. defamation lawsuit filed in Delaware, U.S., in March 2021 by Dominion Voting Systems against Fox News Channel (more specifically, Fox News Network, which includes several outlets and Fox brands) and its corporate parent Fox Corporation. Dominion's complaint sought US$1.6 billion in damages, alleging several Fox programs had broadcast false statements that Dominion's voting machines had been rigged to steal the 2020 United States presidential election from then-president Donald Trump. Fox News argued that it was reporting "pure opinion" regarding what others were saying which, if true, would be protected by the First Amendment to the Constitution.

Dominion focused on allegations made between November 2020 and January 2021 by hosts Maria Bartiromo, Tucker Carlson, Lou Dobbs, Sean Hannity, and Jeanine Pirro. Guests who often appeared with these hosts included Trump attorneys Rudy Giuliani and Sidney Powell, both of whom have also been sued individually by Dominion in federal court. (Note: US Dominion v. Giuliani, 1:21-CV-00213 (D.D.C.); US Dominion v. Powell, 1:21-CV-00040 (D.D.C.).) During pre-trial discovery, Fox News' internal communications were released, indicating that prominent hosts and top executives were aware the network was reporting false statements but continued doing so to retain viewers for financial reasons.

In a summary judgment on March 31, 2023, Delaware Superior Court judge Eric M. Davis ruled that none of the disputed statements either Fox News Network or its parent company, Fox Corp, made about Dominion were true and ordered a trial to determine if the network had acted with actual malice. Several prominent Fox News personalities and senior executives were expected to testify at trial. On April 18, as opening statements were about to begin, the judge announced that the parties had reached a settlement. Fox News agreed to pay Dominion $787.5 million and acknowledged the court's earlier ruling that Fox had broadcast false statements about Dominion. The settlement did not require Fox News to apologize. It is the largest known media settlement for defamation in U.S. history. Later that month, Tucker Carlson was fired from hosting Tucker Carlson Tonight, one of cable's highest-rated news shows, in response to the lawsuit's allegations of a toxic work environment on the show's set.

== Background ==
After Trump's defeat in the 2020 presidential election, Fox News host Jeanine Pirro promoted baseless allegations on her program that Dominion and its competitor Smartmatic had conspired to rig the election against Trump. Hosts Lou Dobbs and Maria Bartiromo also promoted the allegations on their programs on sister network Fox Business. In December 2020, Smartmatic sent a letter to Fox News demanding retractions and threatening legal action, specifying that retractions "must be published on multiple occasions" so as to "match the attention and audience targeted with the original defamatory publications." Days later, each of the three programs aired the same three-minute video segment consisting of an interview with an election technology expert who refuted the allegations promoted by the hosts, responding to questions from an unseen and unidentified man. None of the three hosts personally issued retractions. Smartmatic filed a $2.7 billion defamation suit against the network, the three hosts, Trump campaign attorney Sidney Powell and Trump personal attorney Rudy Giuliani in February 2021. In an April 2021 court brief seeking dismissal of the suit, Fox attorney Paul Clement argued that the network was simply "reporting allegations made by a sitting President and his lawyers." The Smartmatic's lawsuit accusing Fox of defamation is active and moving toward trial as of November 2025. A New York appellate court in January 2025 rejected Fox’s attempt to dismiss the $2.7 billion lawsuit, confirming Smartmatic’s claims of defamation can proceed. This ruling means the case will go to trial unless a settlement occurs beforehand.

== Lawsuit ==
=== Filing ===
In December 2020, Dominion sent a similar letter demanding retractions to Trump attorney Sidney Powell, who had promoted the allegations on Fox programs. On March 26, 2021, Dominion filed a $1.6 billion defamation lawsuit against Fox News, alleging that Fox and some of its pundits spread conspiracy theories about Dominion, and allowed guests to make false statements about the company. On May 18, 2021, Fox filed a motion to dismiss the lawsuit, asserting a First Amendment right "to inform the public about newsworthy allegations of paramount public concern." The motion to dismiss was denied on December 16, 2021 by Davis.

Specifically, Dominion focused on allegations made between November 2020 and January 2021 by Maria Bartiromo on her show Sunday Morning Futures with Maria Bartiromo and Fox & Friends; by Carlson on Tucker Carlson Tonight; by Dobbs on Lou Dobbs Tonight and on Dobbs's Twitter account; by Hannity on Hannity; and by Pirro on Justice with Judge Jeanine. Guests who often appeared during these segments included Rudy Giuliani and Sidney Powell. Dominion was represented by law firms Clare Locke, Farnan LLP, and Susman Godfrey. Fox retained Clement & Murphy, DLA Piper, Ellis George Cipollone, Lehotsky Keller, Richards Layton & Finger, and Winston & Strawn. In addition to asserting First Amendment protection, Fox News cited the landmark 1964 Supreme Court decision New York Times Co. v. Sullivan, which found a public figure seeking to prove defamation must demonstrate that a publisher acted with actual malice: that they knew what they published was false or recklessly disregarded whether it might be false.

In June 2022, Davis again declined to dismiss the Dominion suit against Fox News, and also allowed Dominion to sue the network's corporate parent, Fox Corporation. Davis ruled that Fox Corporation chairman Rupert Murdoch and CEO Lachlan Murdoch may have acted with actual malice because there was a reasonable inference they "either knew Dominion had not manipulated the election or at least recklessly disregarded the truth when they allegedly caused Fox News to propagate its claims about Dominion." He noted a report that Rupert Murdoch spoke with Trump a few days after the election and informed him that he had lost.

=== Discovery ===
The New York Times reported in December 2022 that Dominion had acquired communications between Fox News executives and hosts, and between a Fox Corporation employee and the Trump White House, showing they knew that what the network was reporting was untrue. Dominion attorneys said hosts Sean Hannity and Tucker Carlson, and Fox executives, attested to this in sworn depositions. In November 2020, Sidney Powell appeared on Hannity and asserted Dominion machines had been rigged, but Sean Hannity said in his deposition, "I did not believe it for one second." A February 2023 Dominion court filing showed Fox News primetime hosts messaging each other to insult and mock Trump advisers, indicating the hosts knew the allegations made by Powell and Giuliani were false. Rupert Murdoch messaged that Trump's voter fraud claims were "really crazy stuff", telling Fox News CEO Suzanne Scott that it was "terrible stuff damaging everybody, I fear." As a January 2021 Georgia runoff election approached that would determine party control of the Senate, Murdoch told Scott, "Trump will concede eventually and we should concentrate on Georgia, helping any way we can."

The New York Times, on August 13, 2022, noted that there had been no movement towards settlement from either Dominion or Fox, and both "are deep into document discovery, combing through years of each other's emails and text messages, and taking depositions". They reported that sources "expected Rupert and Lachlan Murdoch, who own and control the Fox Corporation, to sit for depositions as soon as this month". Citing sources at Fox News, speaking under condition of anonymity, they reported "Anchors and executives have been preparing for depositions and have been forced to hand over months of private emails and text messages to Dominion." Among the current and former Fox personnel who have given or were set to give depositions in August were Steve Doocy, Dana Perino, and Shepard Smith. Sources also told the Times that Dominion was focusing on Lachlan Murdoch's reaction to President Trump's anger at the network calling Arizona for Biden, seeking to place him "in the room when the decisions about election coverage were being made". Accounts hold that the younger Murdoch did not pressure anyone to reverse the call, but "he did ask detailed questions about the process that Fox's election analysts had used after the call became so contentious." While Fox continued to claim that any statements made on air were covered by the First Amendment, and as such can not be considered defamation, the Times reported that "Fox has also been searching for evidence that could, in effect, prove the Dominion conspiracy theories weren't really conspiracy theories." After allegations arose that Venezuelan president Hugo Chávez—who died in 2013—was involved in rigging voting machines, lawyers for Fox in court filings asked Dominion to turn over any internal communications going back over a decade that include any of the words "Hugo", "Chávez", "tampered", "backdoor", "stolen", or "Trump". Fox's hiring of Dan K. Webb in the summer of 2022 was seen as "a sign that executives believe that the chances the case is headed to trial have increased".

On August 31, 2022, Hannity was deposed by Dominion's lawyers. The New York Times commented that in most defamation cases settlements are reached before any depositions are taken. As an example, they pointed to how Fox News had settled in 2020 after the parents of Seth Rich sued due to Hannity and other Fox personnel trying to link Rich's death to an email hack. In that case, Fox settled the case before Hannity could be deposed. This was taken as further proof that both sides anticipated the case going to trial.

In early December 2022, the Delaware Superior Court filed notice that Lachlan Murdoch would be deposed under oath at a Los Angeles law firm. The deposition was set to begin on December 5 and "will continue from day to day (Sundays and holidays excluded) until complete, unless otherwise agreed". Also in early December 2022, the Delaware Superior Court filed a notice that Rupert Murdoch would be deposed under oath on December 13–14 via video conference. Previously Fox's lawyers had stated that any efforts to depose the Murdochs and put them at the center of the case would just be a "fruitless fishing expedition".

=== Motions ===
On February 16, 2023, Dominion Voting Systems filed a motion for summary judgment against Fox News, with dozens of internal communications sent during the months after the 2020 presidential election. They showed several prominent network hosts and senior executives—including Fox Corporation chairman Rupert Murdoch and Fox News CEO Suzanne Scott—discussing their knowledge that the allegations of election fraud they were reporting were false. The communications showed their concerns that if they did not continue to report these falsehoods, viewers would be alienated and switch to rival conservative networks like Newsmax and OANN, impacting corporate profitability.

Internal texts and other products of discovery against Fox revealed that Tucker Carlson privately doubted the false claims that the 2020 election was stolen and mocked Trump advisors, including Rudy Giuliani and Sidney Powell. Less than three weeks after the 2020 presidential election, Carlson also publicly cast doubt on Powell's claims pointing out on his show that she never provided his producers or Trump campaign officials with any evidence to support her allegations against Dominion. Carlson texted to Laura Ingraham, "Sidney Powell is lying by the way. I caught her. It's insane" and "Our viewers are good people and they believe it." Carlson texted to Sean Hannity, saying Fox News White House correspondent Jacqui Heinrich should be fired for tweeting a fact-check of false claims Trump made about Dominion. He wrote "Please get her fired. Seriously ... What the fuck? I'm actually shocked ... It needs to stop immediately, like tonight. It's measurably hurting the company. The stock price is down. Not a joke", and said he "just went crazy on" a Fox executive over Heinrich's reporting. Hannity replied that he had already spoken to Fox News CEO Suzanne Scott. By the next morning, Heinrich's tweet had been deleted.

In early 2023, Rupert Murdoch acknowledged in a deposition that some Fox News personalities were endorsing election fraud claims they knew were false.

Former Fox producer Abby Grossberg filed a lawsuit against Fox News in March 2023, alleging she had been pressured by Fox attorneys to provide misleading testimony to implicate herself and her manager Bartiromo.

=== Summary judgment ===
On March 31, 2023, Delaware Superior Court judge Eric Davis ruled in a summary judgment that it "is crystal clear that none of the statements relating to Dominion about the 2020 election are true" and ordered the case to trial on April 17 to determine if the network had acted with actual malice. Davis rejected the assertion of Fox News that the content in question should be treated as "pure opinion" protected by the First Amendment, ruling that the content was either assertions of fact or "mixed opinion." He added that even if the content were pure opinion, "accusations of criminal activity, even in the form of opinion, are not constitutionally protected." Davis forbade Fox News from invoking at trial the fair report privilege that protects journalists from liability for reporting on what they observe others say.

Dominion expected to question several prominent hosts and executives, whom Fox News later said it "intends to make available" at trial. Judge Davis said on April 5 that he would not quash a Dominion subpoena for the testimony of Rupert Murdoch, Lachlan Murdoch, or Paul Ryan, who is a Fox Corporation board member. He further ruled that no testimony during the trial should mention the January 6 attack, calling it "a really big issue that has to be stayed away from" and noting that only one of the broadcasts in question had occurred after that date. "I don't see January 6 as relevant in this case," he said, adding "I know that probably shocks everyone". However, Davis said witnesses could be asked about strategic decisions made after the attack; he noted an email in which Rupert Murdoch said Fox was "pivoting as far as possible" after January 6.

Davis also prohibited Fox News from telling the jury the network's coverage had news value, an argument Fox had intended to emphasize, warning that if it was mentioned "I would have to tell the jury that newsworthiness is not a defense to defamation." Dominion attorneys told Davis they had learned only recently that Murdoch was an officer of Fox News, not merely of Fox Corporation as Fox attorneys had led them to believe, which limited Dominion's access to documents during discovery. A Dominion attorney said it "really affected how we have litigated this case," and Davis said it may have caused him to make "an entirely wrong decision" when he had recently narrowed the scope of the case. A Fox attorney said the Murdoch officer title was simply an honorific. Davis said the next day that he planned to appoint a special master to investigate whether Fox News had lied to the court to withhold evidence; Davis also sanctioned Fox by allowing Dominion to depose additional witnesses. In an April 14 letter to Davis, a Fox News attorney apologized for the "misunderstanding" regarding Murdoch's role, saying Fox "never intended to omit information ... to mislead the Court or evade the question." Davis appointed the special master on the first day of the trial.

== Trial ==
On April 13, jury selection began. On April 16, the night before the trial was scheduled to begin, Judge Davis announced a one-day delay, without any further details, reportedly having asked the parties to try to settle. CNN later reported the delay was to allow veteran mediator Jerry Roscoe time to attempt to reach a deal.

On April 18, the trial was set to begin with opening statements, but was delayed again for the final time. The rules stipulated that reporters in the courtroom would not have been allowed to access the internet nor broadcast audio or video.

== Settlement ==
With the jury seated and attorneys about to make their opening statements, Davis announced Dominion and Fox News had reached a settlement. Fox agreed to pay Dominion $787.5 million. At the time of the settlement, Fox Corporation had $4.1 billion cash on hand. Deadline Hollywood reported that the payment would be tax-deductible for Fox. The settlement was one of the largest defamation settlements in U.S. history, and is believed to be the largest defamation settlement in U.S. history by a media organization.

Fox released a statement saying, in part, "We acknowledge the Court's rulings finding certain claims about Dominion to be false. This settlement reflects Fox's continued commitment to the highest journalistic standards." The settlement did not require Fox News to apologize for any wrongdoing in its programming.

== Reactions and analysis ==
=== Prior to settlement ===
Elon University School of Law professor Enrique Armijo said that it is "so rare to have such contemporaneous evidence of a defamation defendant's state of mind when the statements are being made". First Amendment attorney Martin Garbus told the New York Times "there has never been a case like this. It's going to be a dramatic moment in American history."

Howard Kurtz, host of the Fox News program Media Buzz, called the case "a major test of the First Amendment". Kurtz had two weeks earlier told his viewers that the network would not allow him to discuss the case.

=== After the settlement ===
Fox News' coverage of the settlement was minimal relative to that of other major news outlets.

On April 24, 2023, Fox News announced that Tucker Carlson had agreed to depart the network. It was reported that Carlson had been fired by Murdoch in the wake of the aforementioned Grossberg lawsuit, but that the firing was connected to the suit's allegations of an antisemitic and misogynist culture among the Tucker Carlson Tonight staff, and not the Dominion suit. Tucker Carlson Tonight had been the highest-rated cable news program at various points from 2021 to 2023. Fox News, which still topped ratings that summer, lost a notable amount of viewers, some of whom moved to watching Newsmax. Its timeslot was replaced by Fox News Tonight.
