= Castle Rock Entertainment =

American film and television production company

- Logo used since 1989
- Type: Subsidiary
- Industry: Film; Television
- Founded: June 19, 1987; 39 years ago (original); October 19, 2021; 5 years ago (relaunch)
- Founders: Martin Shafer; Rob Reiner; Andrew Scheinman; Glenn Padnick; Alan F. Horn
- Defunct: April 30, 2002; 24 years ago (original)
- Fate: Absorbed into Warner Bros. (original)
- Headquarters: Beverly Hills, California, U.S.
- Products: Motion pictures Television programs
- Services: Film production Television production
- Parent: Turner Entertainment Co. (1993–1996); Warner Bros. (1996–present); Skydance (2026–present)
- Website: www.castle-rock.com (dormant as of April 2026)

Castle Rock Entertainment is an American independent film and television production company that was founded on June 19, 1987 by Martin Shafer, Andrew Scheinman, Glenn Padnick, Alan Horn, and Rob Reiner.

Castle Rock produced several films, including When Harry Met Sally (1989), Misery (1990), City Slickers (1991), and In the Line of Fire (1993), along with television series, like Seinfeld.

== History ==
=== Origins ===
Rob Reiner named the company in honor of the fictional Maine town of the same name that serves as the setting of several stories by author Stephen King, which itself is named after the fictional mountain fort in William Golding's 1954 novel Lord of the Flies. The logo consists of a lighthouse with the sun rising behind it.

Reiner and Andrew Scheinman already had a production company. They were friends with Martin Shafer, who worked with Horn at 20th Century Fox at the time. Alan Horn was disappointed at Fox and agreed to join the trio in forming the company. Horn brought along Glenn Padnick, who was an executive at Embassy Television. At Castle Rock, Horn became the chief executive officer (CEO), Shafer ran the film division, Padnick ran television, and Reiner and Scheinman became involved in the development of productions.

The company was originally backed by The Coca-Cola Company, then the parent company of Columbia Pictures. Coca-Cola and Castle Rock's founders jointly owned stakes in the company. Months after the deal, Coca-Cola would move away from the entertainment business by merging its film and television assets (Columbia Pictures and Coca-Cola Television) with TriStar Pictures to form Columbia Pictures Entertainment, Inc.

The then-new company, originally called Castle Rock Productions, was targeted to a minimum of 15 features over a five-year period at a three-picture per year pace, with support from then-Columbia Pictures CEO David Puttnam, following the box office success of the film Stand by Me (1986), which was based on the Stephen King novella The Body and produced by Act III Communications (controlled by Reiner's colleague Norman Lear; the film had been in production at Embassy Pictures Corporation when Lear sold Embassy to Columbia, and Lear subsequently paid for production to continue).

Shortly after its formation, Castle Rock appointed Nelson Entertainment, the company that owned the domestic home video rights to Reiner's This Is Spinal Tap (1984), The Sure Thing (1985), and The Princess Bride (1987), to join a five-year, 18-picture joint venture. This was in addition to a pre-existing pact between Nelson and Columbia for a three-year, 12-feature deal, in which Columbia would serve as the co-financing entity; Castle Rock would produce 14 films, while Nelson produced four films themselves.

Under the deal, Nelson also distributed the films on video in North American markets, and handled international theatrical distribution, while Columbia, which Nelson forged a distribution deal with, would receive domestic theatrical distribution rights. Some of Nelson's holdings were later acquired by New Line Cinema, which took over Nelson's duty. Columbia, shortly after the company's formation, thereafter had to re-invest with a substantial change in terms when accumulated losses exhausted its initial funding.

Reiner had stated that Castle Rock's purpose was to allow creative freedom to individuals: a haven away from the pressures of studio executives. Castle Rock was to make films of the highest quality, whether they made or lost money. In 1989, Castle Rock was supported by another backer, Group W, a subsidiary of Westinghouse.

Castle Rock has also produced several television series, most notably the sitcom Seinfeld.

=== Turner purchase, Time Warner ownership and absorption into Warner Bros. ===
In August 1993, Turner Broadcasting System agreed to acquire Castle Rock Entertainment, along with co-financing partner (and eventual Castle Rock Entertainment corporate sibling) New Line Cinema. The sale was completed on December 22, 1993. The motivation behind the purchase was to allow a stronger company to handle the overhead.

By 1994, Castle Rock Entertainment launched a foreign sales operation, Castle Rock International, and planned to produce 12 to 15 films annually. Castle Rock Entertainment also had aspirations to distribute its own films once its deal with Columbia Pictures expired in 1998. It was long rumored that Castle Rock Entertainment's film projects could go to New Line Cinema when the deal expired.

Turner Broadcasting System merged with Time Warner in 1996. After a failed attempt to divest the company, Time Warner integrated Castle Rock Entertainment into Warner Bros. and cut its production slate to five films per year. On June 27, 1997, Castle Rock Entertainment's staff was reduced to 60 employees, and Castle Rock International was folded into Warner Bros.

In January 1998, Warner Bros. and PolyGram Filmed Entertainment formed a deal to co-finance and co-distribute Castle Rock Entertainment films; that deal was taken over by Universal Pictures after the studio's parent company, Seagram, merged with PolyGram later that year. The Warner Bros./Universal deal expired in 2000. On June 19, 2000, after the expiration of the Universal deal, Spanish player Telefónica Media took over its stake in the Castle Rock production company. Castle Rock Entertainment also set up projects with Village Roadshow Pictures and Bel-Air Entertainment, two of Warner Bros.' key production affiliates.

On July 20, 1998, Castle Rock Television took over production of The WB's midseason show Movie Stars, which was set to be in development at Studios USA. In 2001, Castle Rock Television had set up writers Bill Oakley and Josh Weinstein (known for Mission Hill and The Simpsons) with an overall deal, producing several projects, like an unsold family concept pitch at ABC.

In April 2002, Warner Bros. reduced Castle Rock Entertainment's budget following a string of box office bombs. Castle Rock Entertainment fired 16 of its 46 employees, and Castle Rock Entertainment's physical production and public relations departments, back-office duties, and remaining employees were absorbed into Warner Bros.

=== Relaunch ===
In May 2020, Rob and Michele Singer Reiner signed a deal with Warner Bros. Television Studios, and on October 1 of that year, it relaunched the company. On October 19, 2021, the feature division company was revived with a $175 million film fund, under which the studio will develop, produce, and finance new films for global audiences. Prior to the Reiners' deaths in December 2025, Rob and Michele served as Castle Rock CEO and co-president, respectively, with Australian director Matthew George serving as co-president. Castle Rock was to produce films in a first-look deal with Warner Bros. on theatrical content, which has long been its home, in addition to their existing deal with Castle Rock television productions. In April 2022, Jonathan Fuhrman joined Castle Rock Entertainment as EVP and Head of Business Affairs. He reported to Rob and Michele Reiner and Matthew George.

Following an additional $170 million investment from biologist Derrick Rossi, Reiner announced his intention to relaunch Castle Rock through two films: Spinal Tap II: The End Continues (2025)—a sequel to his 1984 This Is Spinal Tap mockumentary—and the Albert Brooks: Defending My Life (2023) documentary, having shopped both films at the 2022 Cannes Film Festival.

Reiner filmed a Spinal Tap concert film at Stonehenge titled Spinal Tap at Stonehenge: The Final Finale, which Bleecker Street acquired the rights to in October 2025 with plans to release the film in the United States for IMAX in 2026. However, as a result of Rob and Michele Reiner's murders in December 2025, plans to release the film have been put on pause (though Castle Rock is still active as a relaunch of the company).

== Ownership of the Castle Rock library ==
Warner Bros. owns the copyrights and overall rights to most of the pre-2010 Castle Rock films and television shows, with a few notable exceptions. Amazon MGM Studios under Metro-Goldwyn-Mayer (MGM) owns certain distribution rights to most of the pre-1994 films by virtue of the purchase of the pre-April 1996 PolyGram Filmed Entertainment/Epic Productions library via Orion Pictures (which had included, in part, the Nelson Entertainment holdings) in 1999. Sony Pictures owns the distribution rights to A Few Good Men (1992), In the Line of Fire (1993), and North (1994), whereas its television division owns the distribution rights to sitcoms Seinfeld and Thea.
