= Liars, Leakers, and Liberals =

2018 book by Jeanine Pirro

Liars, Leakers, and Liberals: The Case Against the Anti-Trump Conspiracy
- Author: Jeanine Pirro
- Language: English
- Subject: Politics
- Genre: Non-fiction
- Publisher: Center Street
- Publication date: July 17, 2018
- Publication place: United States
- Media type: Print (Hardcover and Paperback); electronic (Kindle)
- Pages: 288
- ISBN: 978-1-54608-342-9
- Preceded by: Clever Fox: A Dani Fox Novel

Liars, Leakers, and Liberals: The Case Against the Anti-Trump Conspiracy is a 2018 book authored by Jeanine Pirro, an American TV personality, former judge, prosecutor, district attorney and Republican politician in New York. Pirro was the host of Fox News Channel's Justice with Judge Jeanine. Liars, Leakers, and Liberals is her fifth book.

Published by Center Street and released on July 17, 2018, the 288 page book is listed as non-fiction and is a look inside the first presidency of Donald Trump as well as the politics surrounding the anti-Trump movement. The book's content includes author-conducted interviews with high-ranking administration officials, Trump family members, and those considered White House "insiders". Following the book's release, it was listed on The New York Times Best Seller list.

== Promotion ==
Pirro went on a promotion tour for Liars, Leakers, and Liberals in July 2018.

To promote the book, Piro appeared on the July 20, 2018 broadcast of the American daytime talk show The View, Pirro and host Whoopi Goldberg were involved in an on-air exchange described later by media as a "heated debate" as well as an "explosive fight". After Pirro told show host Goldberg that she "suffers from Trump Derangement Syndrome", Goldberg responded by saying, "What's horrible is when the president of the United States whips up people to beat the hell out of people". Goldberg then telling Pirro "Say goodbye! Bye! I'm done." Appearing on Fox News's commentary show Hannity the following night, Pirro claimed that she "got thrown off the set, thrown out of the building".
