= Alan Jackson (lawyer) =

American attorney (born 1965)

Alan Jay Jackson
- Born: 1965 (age 60–61); Texas, U.S.
- Education: University of Texas at Austin (BA); Pepperdine University (JD)
- Occupation: Attorney
- Years active: 1994–present
- Employer(s): Werksman Jackson & Quinn LLP (partner)
- Known for: Criminal law, prosecution and defense Phil Spector trial

Alan Jay Jackson (born 1965) is an American attorney based in Los Angeles, California. He is recognized for his career in both prosecution and defense within the criminal law sector.

== Early life, education and military service ==
Jackson was born in Texas. He served in the United States Air Force for four years from 1983 to 1987 as a jet engine mechanic. He attended the University of Texas at Austin, earning his bachelor's degree in 1991. He went on to earn his Juris Doctor degree from Pepperdine University School of Law in 1994.

== Career ==
Jackson's career began at the Los Angeles County District Attorney's Office, where he notably served as Assistant Head Deputy of the Major Crimes Division. During his tenure, he prosecuted high-profile cases, including the trial of Phil Spector. He ran for District Attorney in 2012.

Shortly after losing his election for District Attorney, Jackson transitioned to private practice in 2013, joining Palmer, Lombardi & Donohue LLP as a partner. As of 2019, he is a partner at Werksman Jackson & Quinn LLP. He has handled high-profile civil and criminal litigation and has been recognized as one of California's Top 100 Lawyers. His clients have included Kevin Spacey Naason Joaquin Garcia (leader of the church La Luz del Mundo) and Karen A. Read.

Jackson represented former Academy of Motion Picture Arts and Sciences member Jeffrey Cooper, who was convicted of lewd acts on a child and sentenced to eight years in prison on July 25, 2022.

Jackson represented Hollywood producer Harvey Weinstein in his California rape trial between October and December 2022.

Jackson and co-counsel Mark Werksman lost the Weinstein trial on December 19, 2022, when the jury returned guilty verdicts of rape and other sexual assault charges against Weinstein. On February 23, 2023, Weinstein was sentenced to 16 years in prison as a result of those guilty verdicts.

In 2025, Jackson was involved in a high-profile Massachusetts murder trial (Commonwealth v. Read). On June 18, Read was found not guilty on the three major charges; the jury did find her guilty of OUI, for which she received a year's probation.

In December 2025, Jackson was hired to defend Nick Reiner, son of Rob Reiner and Michele Singer Reiner, after Nick was accused of killing Rob and Michele at their Los Angeles home. However, he withdrew from the case the following month.
