= Michele Singer Reiner =

American film producer (1955–2025)

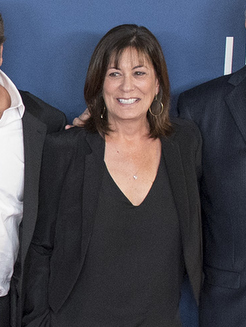
- Reiner in 2016
- Born: Michele Singer; March 3, 1955; Manhattan, New York City, U.S.
- Died: December 14, 2025 (aged 70); Los Angeles, California, U.S.
- Cause of death: Stab wounds (homicide)
- Education: School of Visual Arts
- Occupations: Photographer; political activist; film producer
- Years active: 1987–2025
- Organization: Castle Rock Entertainment
- Spouse: Rob Reiner (m. 1989; died 2025)
- Children: 3

Michele Singer Reiner (March 3, 1955 – December 14, 2025) was an American photographer, political activist, and film producer. Reiner was the second wife of filmmaker and actor Rob Reiner. She was originally a photographer, taking the cover picture of The Art of the Deal (1987). While working on When Harry Met Sally... (1989), Reiner met her future husband and inspired him to revise the film's ending.

She expanded into political activism with her husband and moved into producing in the 2010s, and received nominations at the Primetime Emmy Awards for producing Albert Brooks: Defending My Life (2023). Reiner frequently collaborated with her husband and was the co-president of Castle Rock Entertainment. On December 14, 2025, the couple was found stabbed to death in their Los Angeles home. Their son, Nick Reiner, has been charged with two counts of first-degree murder.

== Early life and education ==
Michele Singer was born on March 3, 1955. (Note: News outlets initially reported her age at death as 68 and 70. The County of Los Angeles Medical Examiner's Office lists her age at 70. Subsequent articles put Michele's age at death as 70, making her birth year 1955.) She was born into a Jewish family. Her mother Nicole Bernheim Silberkleit (née Bernheim) was a French-born Holocaust survivor. At the age of 17, Silberkleit and her family were taken from their home in Strasbourg to the Drancy internment camp, and were later deported to Auschwitz concentration camp. Silberkleit was the only member of her family to leave alive, having escaped a death march in 1944. She immigrated to the United States soon after, first living in Tulsa, Oklahoma, before moving to New York City. There, she had three daughters: Michele, Suzanne and Martine.

Michele Singer grew up on the Upper East Side in Manhattan, New York City. She attended the School of Visual Arts in Manhattan.

== Career ==
Reiner began her career in photography. She started as a photographer's assistant, and then became a freelance photographer, including frequently for Fortune. She worked on the MysteryDisc series of video games as a photographer. In the 1980s, she photographed Donald Trump for the cover of his first book, The Art of the Deal (1987), something she later described as "regrettable". Years later, her future husband would become a well-known critic of Trump. She also photographed the real estate tycoon Samuel J. LeFrak.

Rob Reiner met her on the set of When Harry Met Sally..., and she inspired him to alter the ending so that Harry and Sally entered a romantic relationship by the end of the film. She worked as an actress in the Nora Ephron film Mixed Nuts (1994). She collaborated with her husband on several films, including Misery, where she was a photographer, and later pivoted towards producing with I Am Your Child (1997), a television film directed by her husband. The film also launched a campaign at a White House conference headed by Reiner and Rob, intended to bring attention to early childhood development.

She continued producing with Shock and Awe (2017), Albert Brooks: Defending My Life (2023), God & Country (2024), and Spinal Tap II: The End Continues (2025). For her work on Albert Brooks: Defending My Life, she received a nomination for Outstanding Documentary Or Nonfiction Special at the 76th Primetime Emmy Awards. In 2023, Reiner was a producer on the iHeartMedia podcast Who Killed JFK?, which her husband also produced and co-hosted with journalist Soledad O'Brien.

In 2020, Reiner and her husband signed a producing and directing deal with Warner Bros. Television by a production company under Castle Rock Entertainment, which Rob helped found. Reiner was the co-president of Castle Rock Entertainment along with Matthew George. She also founded the production and photography company Reiner Light. Reiner and her husband were executive producers on Wind River: The Next Chapter, a sequel to Wind River (2017), prior to their deaths.

In addition to filmmaking and photography, Reiner was also a political activist for the Democratic Party. Rob credited Michele with being the "force" to the couple's advocacy. The couple headed a campaign in California to fund early childhood development programs by increasing tobacco taxes. Both collectively donated $1.55 million for the 1998 California Proposition 10, which led them to being part of the top 20 individual donors to political action committees in 1998. They also founded the American Foundation for Equal Rights, which overturned 2008 California Proposition 8 and launched a federal lawsuit for same-sex marriage rights; Reiner was an LGBTQ rights activist. Her and Rob's advocacy helped achieve the landmark decision to allow marriage equality across the United States, with Kelley Robinson saying "they remained committed to the cause until their final days." Later in her life, she focused on supporting those wrongfully incarcerated, working with the Innocence Project. Her advocacy for various social justice issues was inspired by her mother, who survived the Holocaust.

== Personal life ==
Reiner was fluent in French and Spanish. She met her future husband Rob Reiner on the set of When Harry Met Sally... (1989). The eponymous character Harry, a "miserable, divorced, Jewish romantic lead", was based on Rob. Rob had intended to call Michelle Pfeiffer after reading about her divorce in a magazine, to which Barry Sonnenfeld, the film's photography director, said, "You're not going to call her, you're going to marry my friend Michele Singer". They married in 1989, in a private ceremony in Hawaii witnessed by two strangers, one of whom was an elderly woman who told Rob she was a fan of The Princess Bride. They had three children: Jake (b. 1991), Nick (b. 1993), and Romy (b. 1997).

Michele and Rob's eldest son Jake has been involved in filmmaking and was a news reporter in Houston, Texas. Second son Nick entered the first of a number of stays in drug rehabilitation at the age of 14, cycling "in and out of rehab" subsequently for years, and was even homeless at times. He has been arrested and charged for the murder of his parents. Their youngest child, daughter Romy, is a filmmaker and had a very close relationship with them. Romy discovered her father's body in their Brentwood home soon after the killing.

== Death ==
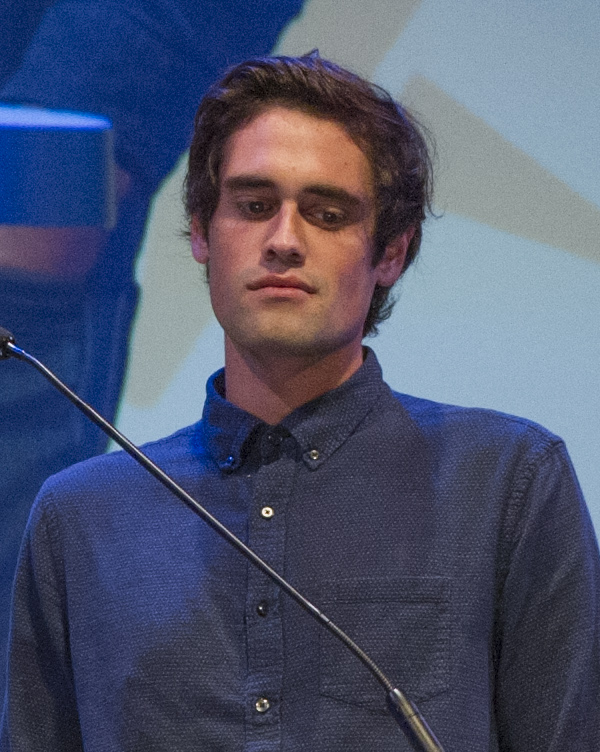
Nick Reiner, 2016

Reiner and her husband were due to have dinner with Michelle and Barack Obama on the evening of December 14, 2025. That afternoon, a massage therapist came to their Brentwood, Los Angeles, residence at 255 South Chadbourne Avenue, for a previously scheduled appointment for the couple, and was met with a lack of response; she then called the couple's daughter Romy. Romy, who lived in a property across the street, arrived quickly at around 3 p.m., and discovered her father's body. Her friend then called 911.

Reiner and her husband were murdered early in the morning on December 14 from multiple stab wounds. She was 70. At the time of their deaths, they had been married for 36 years. Their son Nick was soon arrested on suspicion of murder. On December 17, Michele and Rob's other two children, Jake and Romy, released a joint statement calling their parents their "best friends." Various prominent figures extended tributes towards Reiner and her husband, including Nancy Pelosi, Bill and Hillary Clinton, and Laurie David. Rita Wilson, who was friends with Reiner, wrote that she was an "enormously talented photographer" and praised her producing work. Kelley Robinson, the president of LGBTQ advocacy group Human Rights Campaign, thanked Reiner for her allyship and support of the community, while Dustin Lance Black, another LGBTQ activist, said "the world has lost two of its greatest champions of justice, love and equality". Los Angeles County District Attorney Nathan Hochman called Reiner an "iconic photographer and producer". Reiner and her husband were cremated on December 19.

The Los Angeles Police Department opened a homicide investigation into their deaths and on December 16, her son Nick was charged with two counts of first-degree murder with a special circumstance of multiple murders. Nick made his first court appearance on the murder charges on December 17, with the appearance only being brief. His arraignment was initially set to be held on January 7, 2026. However, it would be delayed to February 23, 2026, after Nick's attorney Alan Jackson withdrew from his legal defense during a court appearance. While appearing in court on February 23, 2026, Nick pled not guilty. However, he would also once again be denied bail and, as of February 2026, remains jailed. During his April 29, 2026 hearing, Nick agreed to a general time waiver, thus waiving his right to a speedy trial. The next preliminary hearing for Nick was then set for September 15, 2026.

== Filmography ==
Key
†	Denotes films that have not yet been released

Year	Title	Role	Ref.
1990	Misery	Special photographer	
1994	Mixed Nuts	Actress	
1997	I Am Your Child	Producer	
2017	Shock and Awe	Producer	
2023	Albert Brooks: Defending My Life	Producer	
2024	God & Country	Producer	
2025	Spinal Tap II: The End Continues	Producer	
TBA	Wind River: The Next Chapter †	Executive producer	

== Awards and nominations ==
Awards and nominations received by Michele Singer Reiner
Award	Year	Category	Nominated work	Result	Ref.
Primetime Emmy Awards	2024	Outstanding Documentary Or Nonfiction Special	Albert Brooks: Defending My Life	Nominated	
Producers Guild of America Awards	2024	Outstanding Producer of Non-Fiction Television	Albert Brooks: Defending My Life	Nominated	
