= Albert Brooks: Defending My Life =

2023 documentary film

- Film poster
- Directed by: Rob Reiner
- Produced by: Matthew George; Rob Reiner; Michele Singer Reiner
- Cinematography: Barry Markowitz; Rocker Meadows
- Edited by: Bob Joyce
- Music by: Marc Shaiman
- Production companies: Castle Rock Entertainment; HBO Documentary Films; Final Cut Partners
- Distributed by: HBO
- Release dates: October 26, 2023 (AFI Fest); November 11, 2023 (United States)
- Running time: 88 minutes
- Country: United States
- Language: English

Albert Brooks: Defending My Life is a 2023 American documentary film directed by Rob Reiner. It is a tribute to the American actor, comedian, film director, and screenwriter Albert Brooks. In addition to directing the film, Reiner also interviews Brooks, revealing the two had been best friends since meeting at Beverly Hills High School. Much of the documentary is a conversation between Brooks and Reiner, who had been friends for nearly 60 years. The film follows the life of Brooks from his early childhood in a showbiz family through his years in the industry.

The documentary aired on HBO on November 11, 2023. It has since become available for streaming on HBO Max.

== Reception ==
On the review aggregator website Rotten Tomatoes, 97% of 32 critics' reviews are positive, with an average rating of 8.3/10. The website's consensus reads: "Albert Brooks: Defending My Life offers an engrossing and suitably funny overview of its subject's career – and one that'll leave you wanting to watch more of his work." Metacritic, which uses a weighted average, assigned the film a score of 74 out of 100, based on 7 critics, indicating "generally favorable" reviews.

Matt Zoller Seitz of RogerEbert.com gave the film three and a half out of four stars and wrote, "This film will be a treat for anyone who loves any part of Brooks' career, or all of it. And its subject is so fascinating and open-hearted that one can imagine people who've never heard his name until now getting something out of it, too."
