= 2006 New York Attorney General election =

- November 7, 2006
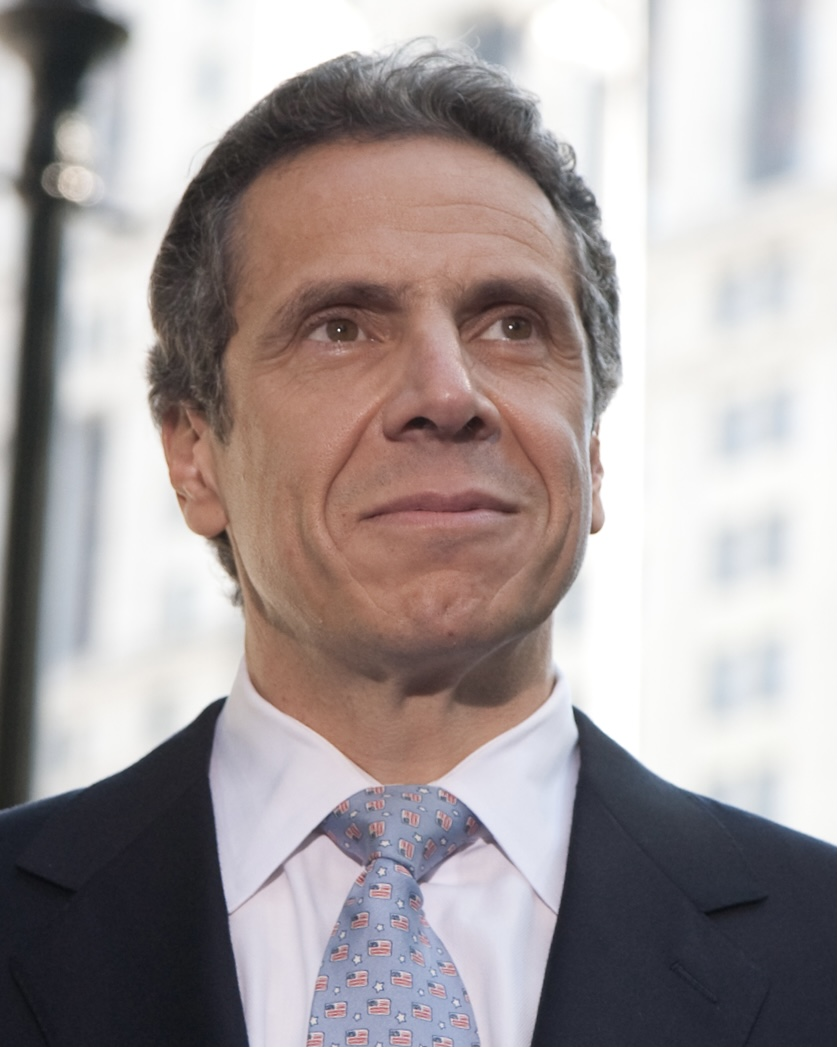

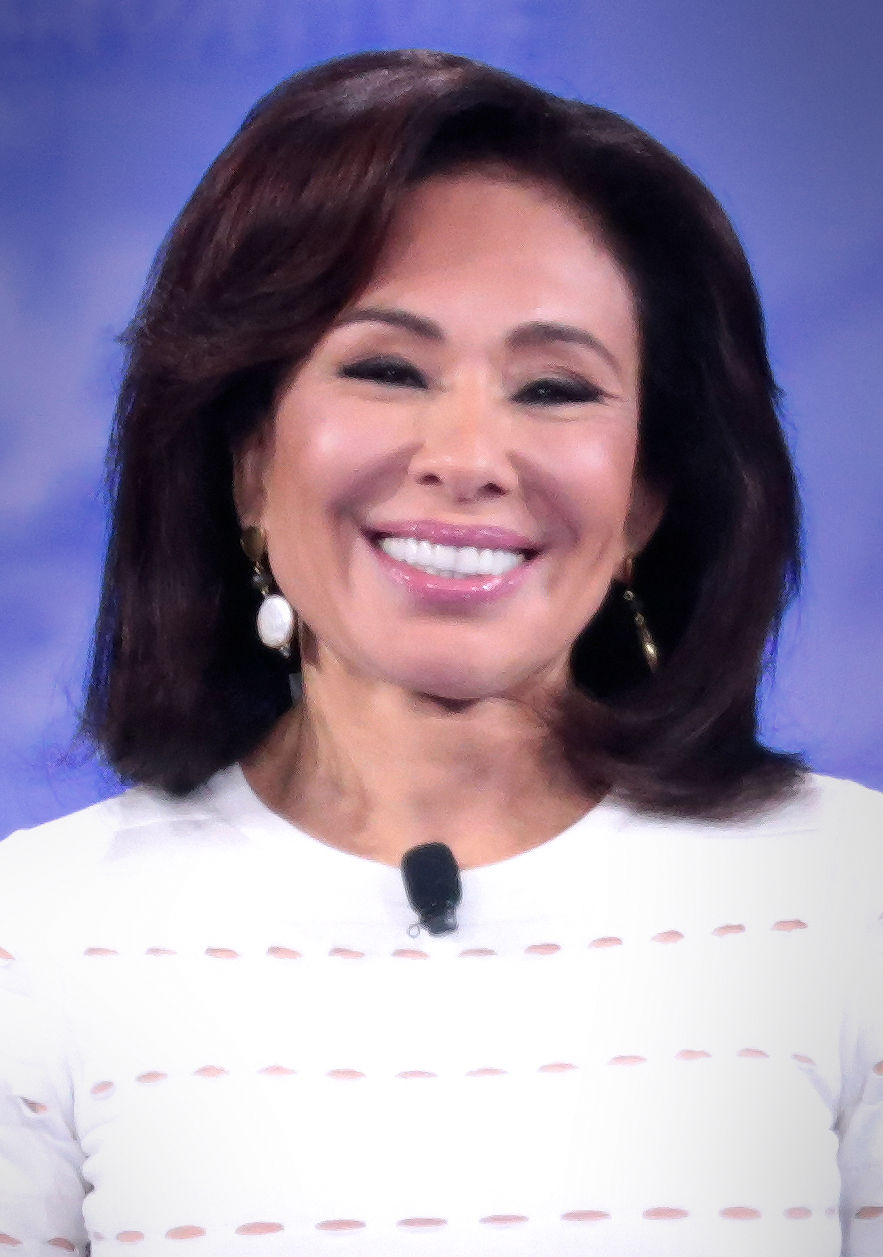
Nominee	Andrew Cuomo	Jeanine Pirro
Party	Democratic	Republican
Popular vote	2,509,311	1,692,580
Percentage	58.31%	39.33%
- County results Cuomo: 40–50% 50–60% 60–70% 70–80% 80–90% Pirro: 40–50% 50–60% 60–70%
Attorney General before election
Eliot Spitzer
Democratic
Elected Attorney General
Andrew Cuomo
Democratic

The 2006 New York Attorney General election took place on November 7, 2006. Democrat Andrew Cuomo was elected to replace Eliot Spitzer (who became Governor) as the Attorney General of New York.

== Democratic primary ==
=== Candidates ===
- Andrew Cuomo, former United States Secretary of Housing and Urban Development and son of Mario Cuomo
- Mark Green, former New York City Public Advocate
- Sean Patrick Maloney, former White House Staff Secretary

==== Withdrew ====
- Charlie King, former Department of Housing and Urban Development official (withdrew September 5; endorsed Cuomo)

==== Declined ====
Robert F. Kennedy Jr., environment protection attorney

=== Polling ===
Source	Date	Andrew Cuomo	Mark Green	Charlie King	Sean Patrick Maloney
Results	September 12, 2006	53%	32.39%	4.80%	9.29%
Carolco	September 10, 2006	47%	33%	—	20%
Green Papers	September 9, 2006	47%	35%	—	18%
Green Papers	September 8, 2006	50%	29%	—	21%
Green Papers	September 7, 2006	52%	31%	—	17%
Green Papers	September 6, 2006	51%	33%	—	16%
Qunnipiac	September 5, 2006	53%	31%	—	18%
Quinnipiac	September 3, 2006	40%	23%	16%	11%
Quinnipiac	August 29, 2006	42%	26%	14%	8%
Quinnipiac	August 5, 2006	49%	21%	9%	6%
Quinnipiac	July 22, 2006	57%	19%	5%	3%

=== Results ===
Primary results by county: Cuomo: 40–50%; 50–60%; 60–70%; 70–80%

Democratic primary results
Party	Candidate	Votes	%
Democratic	Andrew Cuomo	404,086	53.52%
Democratic	Mark Green	244,554	32.39%
Democratic	Sean Patrick Maloney	70,106	9.29%
Democratic	Charlie King (withdrawn)	36,262	4.80%
Majority		159,532	21.13%
Turnout		755,008	15.59%

== Republican primary ==
=== Candidates ===
- Jeanine Pirro, Westchester County District Attorney

=== Results ===
Republican primary results
Party	Candidate	Votes	%
Republican	Jeanine Pirro	Unopposed	
Total votes		—N/a	100.0

== General election ==
=== Candidates ===
- Andrew Cuomo, former United States Secretary of Housing and Urban Development and son of Mario Cuomo (Democratic)
- Christopher B. Garvey, patent and trademark attorney (Libertarian)
- Martin Koppel, political organizer and writer (Socialist Workers)
- Jeanine Pirro, Westchester County District Attorney (Republican)
- Rachel Treichler, lawyer and candidate for the New York State Assembly and the U.S. House of Representatives (Green)

=== Polling ===
Source	Date	Andrew Cuomo (D)	Jeanine Pirro (R)
Marist	November 3, 2006	58%	37%
Green Papers	September 9, 2006	53%	47%
Green Papers	September 7, 2006	54%	46%
Quinnipiac	September 5, 2006	58%	42%
Quinnipiac	September 3, 2006	55%	45%
Quinnipiac	August 29, 2006	58%	42%
Quinnipiac	August 5, 2006	61%	37%
Quinnipiac	July 22, 2006	66%	30%

=== Results ===
General election results
Party	Candidate	Votes	%
Democratic	Andrew Cuomo	2,356,809	54.77%
Working Families	Andrew Cuomo	152,502	3.54%
Total	Andrew Cuomo	2,509,311	58.31%
Republican	Jeanine Pirro	1,376,218	31.98%
Conservative	Jeanine Pirro	168,051	3.90%
Independence	Jeanine Pirro	148,401	3.45%
Total	Jeanine Pirro	1,692,580	39.33%
Green	Rachel Treichler	61,849	1.44%
Libertarian	Christopher B. Garvey	29,413	0.68%
Socialist Workers	Martin Koppel	10,197	0.24%
Total votes		4,303,350	100.00%
Democratic hold			

== See also ==
- 2006 New York gubernatorial election
- 2006 United States Senate election in New York
- 2006 New York State Comptroller election
- Paterson, David "Black, Blind, & In Charge: A Story of Visionary Leadership and Overcoming Adversity." New York, New York, 2020.
