= I Am Your Child =

1997 American television film

- Directed by: Rob Reiner
- Written by: Rob Reiner
- Produced by: Rob Reiner; Michele Singer Reiner
- Production company: American Broadcasting Company
- Distributed by: American Broadcasting Company
- Release date: April 28, 1997 (United States)
- Country: United States
- Language: English

I Am Your Child is a television film and partial documentary directed by Rob Reiner and distributed by the American Broadcasting Company. It is about the importance of early childhood development, and features an ensemble cast of guest appearances, while Tom Hanks hosted the programme. It was supported by a campaign launched in the White House for childhood development.

== Premise ==
The film blends comedic skits featuring the guest cast in fictional scenarios depending on how their early childhood development affected them, and a documentary film interviewing three families in Hampton, Virginia who have benefitted from government funding of childhood development programs.

== Cast ==
- Tom Hanks, host
- Roseanne Barr
- Mel Brooks
- Bill Clinton
- Hillary Clinton
- Billy Crystal
- Michael J. Fox
- Charlton Heston
- Jon Lovitz
- Rosie O'Donnell
- Shaquille O'Neal
- Colin Powell
- Carl Reiner
- Rob Reiner
- Martin Short
- Alex Trebek
- Robin Williams
- Oprah Winfrey
- Robin Wright

== Production ==
Rob Reiner directed, produced, and wrote the film, while his wife Michele Singer Reiner co-produced it. Rob Reiner became interested in the influence early childhood development had on a person and the "nature versus nurture" debate in the 1980s. Tom Hanks joined as the host of the television documentary film, and Barry Manilow composed the theme song, "I Am Your Child". It was distributed by the American Broadcasting Company.

The film was also supported with a campaign of the same name. The campaign was launched at a conference in the White House in mid-April 1997, and was headed by Rob and Michele Reiner. It aimed to bring attention to the importance of early childhood development, and was supported by research from a 1994 report by the Carnegie Corporation of New York.

== Release ==
The film premiered on the American Broadcasting Company (ABC) on April 28, 1997.

== Reception ==
Hal Boedeker for Orlando Sentinel criticized the film for its disorganized structure and choice of segments, particularly its use of real-life stories mixed in with skits featuring prominent celebrities.
