= Twin Towers Correctional Facility =

Jail in Los Angeles

Coordinates: 34.05905932°N 118.23157174°W

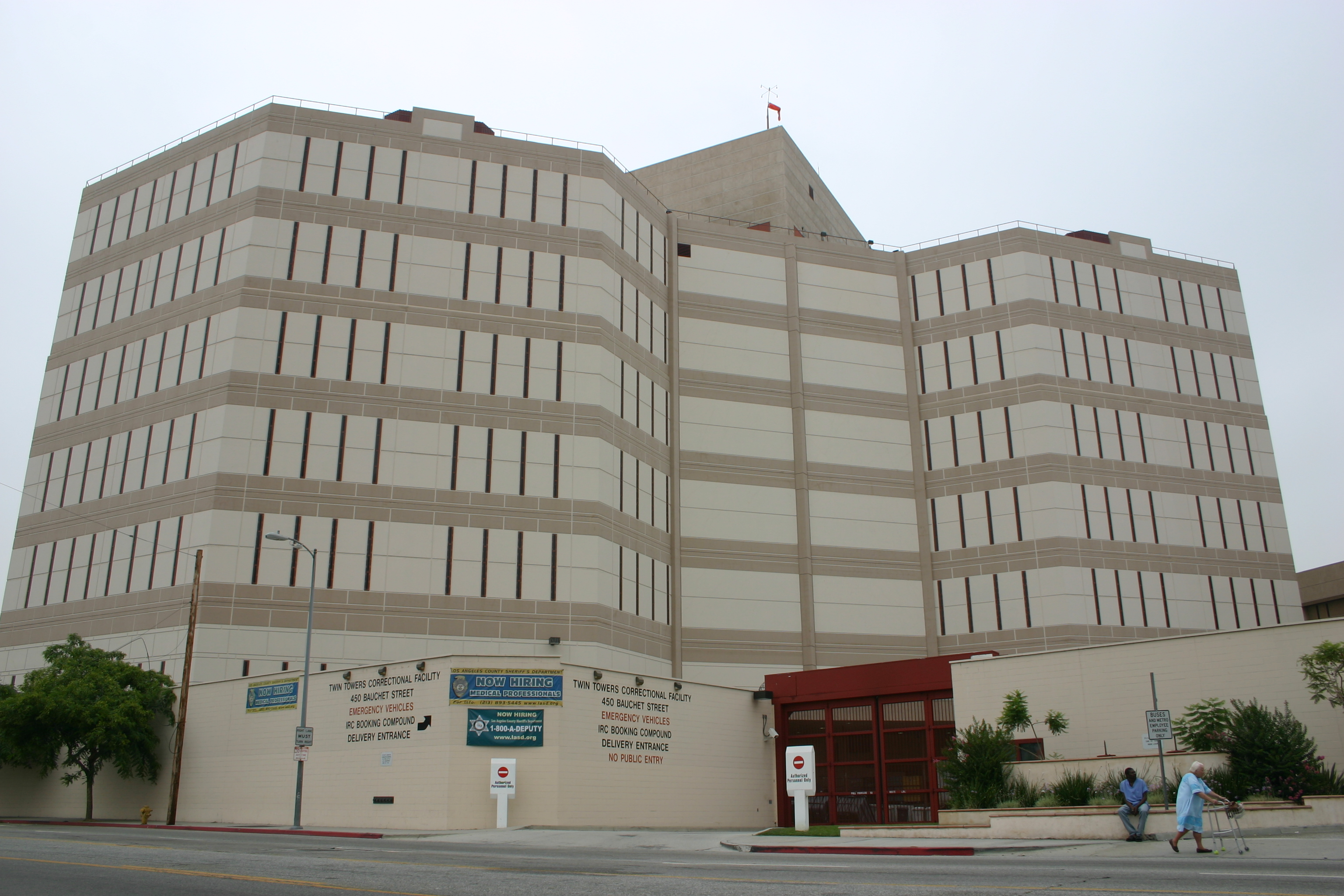
- Interactive map of Twin Towers Correctional Facility
- Location: Los Angeles, California, U.S.
- Status: Operational
- Security class: Minimum–Maximum
- Capacity: 2,074 (Tower 1); 2,085 (Tower 2)
- Population: 2,439 (March 2025)
- Opened: 1997; 29 years ago
- Managed by: Los Angeles County Sheriff's Department
- Governor: Gavin Newsom

The Twin Towers Correctional Facility, also referred to in the media as Twin Towers Jail, is a jail complex in Los Angeles, California. The facility is located at 450 Bauchet Street in Los Angeles and is operated by the Los Angeles County Sheriff's Department. The facility consists of two towers, a medical services building, and the Los Angeles County Medical Center Jail Ward.

== History ==
The jail was authorized and constructed after the 1994 Northridge earthquake damaged the historic Hall of Justice in the city. The 1.5 million square foot (140,000 m^{2}) complex was opened in 1997, though it remained empty for a period prior to opening because of lack of operating funds. During that time, the deputy sheriffs had to prevent people from breaking in. Security at the facility centers on a panopticon design that allows deputies and officers in a central control room to look through secure optical material to see into all areas of the facility.

Despite the state-of-the-art security systems built into the jail, inmate Kevin Jerome Pullum walked out of an employee exit on July 6, 2001, two hours after being convicted of attempted murder, and remained at large for eighteen days before he was apprehended within a mile of the jail. Pullum used a newspaper photograph of actor Eddie Murphy to alter an identification badge he used in the escape. The attempt made Pullum the 13th person to successfully escape the facility.

In May 2013, along with the adjacent Men's Central Jail, Twin Towers ranked as one of the ten worst county jails in the United States, based on reporting in Mother Jones, which noted the large number of complaints received by the American Civil Liberties Union (ACLU). Mother Jones described the facility as "overflowing" and the deputies as prone to attacking inmates "unprovoked" or for "the slightest infractions". They report an allegation that one inmate injured in an attack by multiple deputies was marched down a jail module as one deputy yelled "gay boy walking" and then beaten and raped by other inmates as deputies watched.

The jail has also received criticism from human rights advocates as a central focus in the use of psychiatric medication to control prisoners.

The facility has been used as a filming location for the movies Blast and Mean Guns, both directed by Albert Pyun.

== Notable inmates ==
- D4vd, singer-songwriter
- Robert Durst, real estate heir and killer, extradited to California to face murder charge for killing best friend Susan Berman
- The Game, rapper
- Freddie Gibbs, rapper
- Ron Jeremy, pornographic actor
- Johnny "J", rap producer
- Paris Hilton, reality TV personality. Was in jail for a few weeks.
- Danny Masterson, former actor
- Conrad Murray, Michael Jackson's personal doctor
- Nick Reiner, son of film director and actor Rob Reiner, being held over for trial in the murder case of his father and his mother
- Steve-O, Jackass cast member
- Harvey Weinstein, former film producer extradited from New York to face his sexual assault trials
