= Libby Locke =

American lawyer

Elizabeth "Libby" Locke
- Occupation: Lawyer

Elizabeth "Libby" Locke is an American lawyer. She specializes in defamation cases. Together with her husband Tom Clare she owns the law firm Clare Locke.

== Career ==
Locke and her husband Tom Clare run the law firm Clare Locke LLP. They founded Clare Locke in 2014 after leaving Kirkland & Ellis LLP and each owns half of the company. Clare Locke specializes in reputation-based cases, especially defamation.

In 2016 Locke represented a University of Virginia administrator against Rolling Stone magazine in a case resulting from the article "A Rape on Campus", yielding a $3 million jury verdict.

In 2016 Locke represented Graham Spanier in a lawsuit against Louis Freeh which resulted from an investigation Freeh had conducted into the Jerry Sandusky scandal.

In 2019 she represented Sarah Palin in a lawsuit against The New York Times.

In 2019 she defended Matt Lauer against sexual assault allegations.

In 2020 Locke represented Away in a case against The Verge.

In 2021 she represented Project Veritas in a defamation lawsuit against Stanford University. She also represented Project Veritas against The New York Times.

In 2021 Locke represented ShotSpotter in a defamation lawsuit against Vice Media.

In 2023, the firm was one of two to negotiate a settlement with Fox News on behalf of their client, Dominion Voting Systems in the defamation lawsuit brought by Dominion in 2021.

== Personal life ==
Her father was a businessman and air national guardsman, her mother was a pediatric emergency room nurse and later dog breeder. She has one child with Clare and two from a previous marriage. Locke identifies politically as an American conservative.
