= Judge Jeanine Pirro =

American reality court show (2008–2011)

- Also known as: Judge Pirro
- Genre: Arbitration-based reality court show
- Starring: Jeanine Pirro
- Narrated by: William Price
- Theme music composer: Norman Arnold
- Country of origin: United States
- Original language: English
- No. of seasons: 4
- No. of episodes: 495

Production
- Executive producers: Bo Banks; Hilary Estey
- Camera setup: Multi-camera
- Production company: Telepictures Productions

Original release
- Network: The CW (season 1); Syndication (seasons 2–4)
- Release: September 22, 2008 – May 25, 2011

Related
- Judge Mathis

Judge Jeanine Pirro (known simply as Judge Pirro since the premiere of its second season) is an American arbitration-based reality court show, presided over by retired Westchester County, New York, District Attorney Jeanine Pirro. The series debuted on The CW on September 22, 2008, and ended in May 2011.

== Synopsis ==
As with other court shows, such as Judge Mathis and Judge Judy, a former judge serves as neutral arbitrator, and awards the litigants monetary judgments, of up to $5000, which is paid in full by the program's producers. However, this program dealt more with the emotional aspect of each case, which was one of the show's benchmarks.

== Production ==
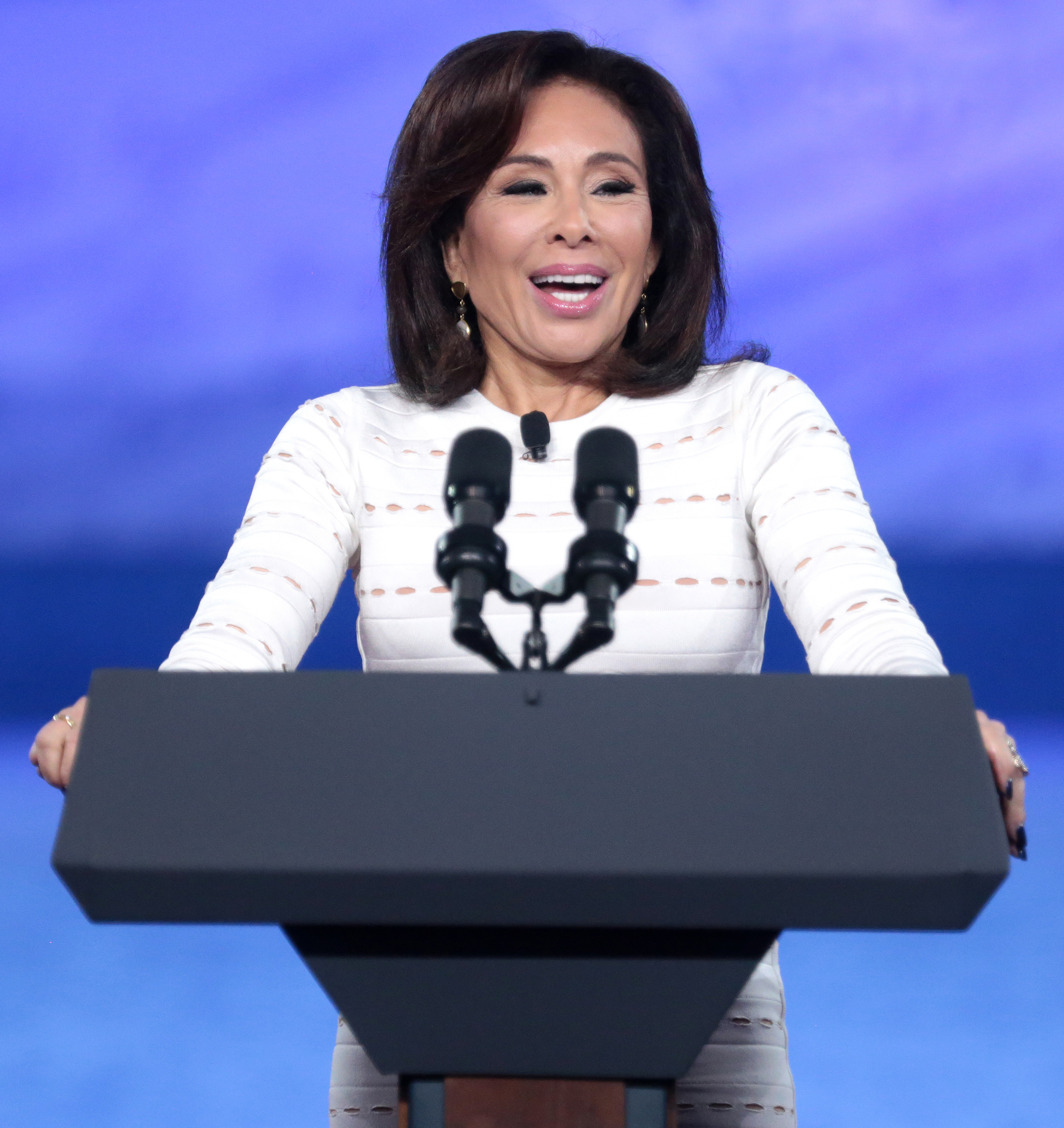
Jeanine Pirro

Judge Jeanine Pirro was recorded in Chicago at NBC Tower, the NBC network's Chicago broadcast base and home to the related courtroom series Judge Mathis, and was produced by Telepictures Productions, distributed in syndication by Warner Bros. Domestic Television Distribution. Greg Mathis, who presides over the aforementioned Judge Mathis, served as this series' consultant.

Upon its premiere, Judge Pirro was made part of The CW Daytime programming block; meaning that, while technically a syndicated series, it only aired on CW affiliates. Following its first season, The Tyra Banks Show, another show by Telepictures Productions, was pulled from national syndication and took over Judge Pirro's place in the CW Daytime lineup, resulting in the series moving to Fox-owned stations, along with regular syndication outside of Fox O&O markets.

In the spring of 2011, due to low ratings, Judge Pirro was cancelled, ending its run in May. Also, in 2011, shortly before the show's cancellation, it was nominated for its second Daytime Emmy Award following a 2010 nomination and won the Daytime Emmy Award for Outstanding Legal/Courtroom Program.

== Notable appearances ==
Some reality television stars, along with a wrestler, appeared on the show during its run.

- The Honky Tonk Man
- Dennis Rodman
- Ron Jeremy
- Air Force Amy
- Joey Kovar
- Bianca Golden
- Kirsten Stiff Walker
- George Weisgerber
- Joey Buttafuoco

Honky Tonk Man was a witness for a defendant in a case; the others listed were plaintiffs in their respective cases.

== Controversy ==
One of the bailiffs, Jimmie Akins, was fired after he was arrested for attempted extortion charges.
