= Tom Clare (lawyer) =

American lawyer

Thomas A. Clare is an American lawyer who specializes in defamation law.

== Career ==
Clare and his wife Libby Locke run the law firm Clare Locke LLP. They founded Clare Locke in 2014 after leaving Kirkland & Ellis LLP.

Clare represented Dominion Voting Systems against Rudy Giuliani, Sidney Powell and Mike Lindell in defamation cases related to the 2020 United States presidential election.

For about eighteen months beginning in the summer of 2019 he sent letters to journalist Patrick Radden Keefe, the New Yorker and Doubleday attempting to undermine the publication of Empire of Pain.

In January 2021 Clare was retained by Adam Neumann to defend his reputation. In 2022 he got HBO to change their characterization of the show Generation Hustle which featured an episode on Neumann and WeWork as being about scammers and true crime.

In 2025 Clare was retained by Emmanuel and Brigitte Macron to take action against Candace Owens over repeated claims that Owens has made alleging that Brigitte is secretly transgender.

Also in 2025, Clare Locke was reported to have represented UnitedHealthcare in connection with a dispute involving a breast cancer surgeon who alleged that the insurer interrupted patient care over coverage disagreements. According to one report, the firm issued correspondence challenging the surgeon’s public statements. The case received coverage in medical and legal press, where some commentators criticized the insurer’s handling of the matter.

== Personal life ==
Clare's father was an aerospace engineer who worked for the Navy and his mother was a housewife.

Clare identifies politically as an American conservative.
