= Killing of Rob and Michele Reiner =

2025 double homicide in Los Angeles, California, US

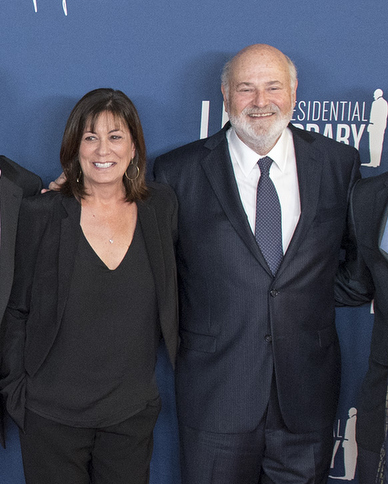
- Michele and Rob Reiner in 2016
- Location: Brentwood, Los Angeles, California, US
- Date: December 14, 2025; 11 months ago
- Attack type: Homicide
- Deaths: 2
- Victims: Rob Reiner; Michele Singer Reiner
- Accused: Nick Reiner
- Charges: First-degree murder with special circumstances (×2)

On December 14, 2025, American filmmaker Rob Reiner and his wife, photographer and producer Michele Singer Reiner, were found dead with multiple sharp force injuries at their home in Brentwood, a neighborhood in Los Angeles, California. Their son, Nick Reiner, was arrested later that day on suspicion of murder. The case against him is ongoing.

== Background ==
Rob Reiner was an American actor, director, and political activist. His credits include This Is Spinal Tap, The Princess Bride, When Harry Met Sally..., Misery, Stand by Me, and A Few Good Men. Michele Singer Reiner was a photographer, producer, and LGBTQ rights advocate. Rob and Michele married in 1989 and had three children. Rob also had an older adopted daughter, Tracy, whose mother was his former wife, Penny Marshall.

Rob was 78 years old and Michele was 70 years old (Note: News outlets reported her age as 68 and 70. The County of Los Angeles Medical Examiner's Office lists her age as 70.) at the time of their deaths.

=== Nick Reiner ===
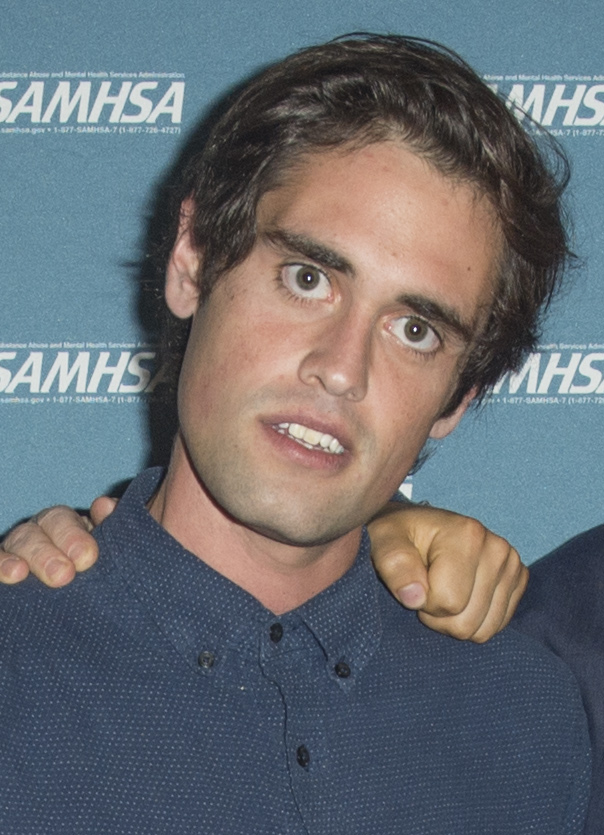
Nick Reiner in 2016

Nicholas Reiner (born September 14, 1993) is the second of three children: he has an older brother, Jake, and a younger sister, Romy. He was born and raised in Los Angeles. He attended Wildwood, a private school in West Los Angeles. Reiner has a GED credential, but decided not to attend college.

Before his arrest, Nick Reiner had discussed long-running substance abuse problems in interviews and podcasts, including periods in and out of treatment beginning in his adolescence. Nick's first stint at a drug rehab was when he was 14 years old. He shared a room at one of the treatment centers with a boy who was addicted to heroin, a drug that Nick would try in later years. The Irish Times, summarizing prior public accounts, reported that Nick estimated he entered drug treatment eighteen times by the time he was 16, and spoke about addiction to heroin and cocaine. Rob Reiner said that reading David Sheff's memoir Beautiful Boy: A Father's Journey Through His Son's Addiction educated him about his son's situation. Nick had an often contentious relationship with his parents, who committed many resources toward his recovery.

In 2015, Nick Reiner co-wrote the film Being Charlie, which was inspired by his experiences with addiction and his relationship with his father, who directed the film. The film centered on an addict (Nick Robinson) whose father (Cary Elwes) is a former actor turned politician. Despite the constant cycle of active addiction and stays in rehab centers, Nick reportedly became closer to his father during the production of Being Charlie. However, Nick suffered several relapses and police visited the Reiner home on many occasions over the following decade due to incidents involving him. In a September 2025 interview with Fresh Air, while Rob was promoting Spinal Tap II: The End Continues, he said he believed his son was doing well. "He's been great … hasn't been doing drugs for over six years, he's in a really good place", Reiner said.

Nick was placed into a year-long mental health conservatorship in 2020. The conservatorship ended in 2021. At certain points, Nick was homeless, but at the time of their deaths, Nick was living with his parents.

The night before Rob and Michele Reiner were discovered dead, the couple and Nick had attended a Christmas party hosted by Conan O'Brien, but left after Nick, who reportedly "was freaking everyone out, acting crazy, [and] kept asking people if they were famous", got into a "very loud argument" with Rob. During the argument, Rob reportedly chastised his son for his conduct. Another associate of the Reiner family disputed the intensity of the argument and told The New York Times that the Reiners would not have left the party early due to Nick's behavior, which the family had grown accustomed to.

== Killings and investigation ==
On the afternoon of December 14, 2025, Rob and Michele Reiner were due for a massage appointment and scheduled to have dinner with Barack Obama and Michelle Obama. The Reiners' massage therapist arrived at their Brentwood home at 2:00PM, knocked on their door, rang the doorbell several times, then left after receiving no answer. Their daughter Romy, who lived right across the street, went to check on her parents, and discovered her father's body in the master bedroom. Her roommate called 911 at 3:38 p.m. Pacific Standard Time after Romy fled the residence. Romy then contacted Billy Crystal and his wife Janice, close friends of the Reiner family, who arrived at the scene as emergency services were attending to the victims.

Romy contacted her brother Jake, who was at Union Station in Downtown Los Angeles attending a celebration of life event for a high school friend. Jake initially screened the call because he was in the middle of the event, but she called back immediately, which made him realize that something was wrong. When he answered, Romy told him that their father was dead, and then said that she couldn't find their mother. Jake immediately went into shock, and realized he needed to leave the station and get to his parents' home. Los Angeles Fire Department paramedics responding to the call found the Reiners dead inside the house. Romy and Jake were reportedly unaware of their mother's death before paramedics arrived. Los Angeles Police Department officers responded shortly afterward for what the department described as a death investigation that later developed into a homicide case. The investigation was handled by the LAPD's robbery and homicide division, and police stated detectives were working to obtain a search warrant as part of the investigation.

It was discovered that Nick had checked into room 207 at the Pierside Santa Monica hotel. Police searched the hotel for him, but he had already left. Police also discovered that the shower Nick had used was full of blood; blood was also found on his bed mattress. Hours before his arrest, CCTV footage captured Nick entering an Arco gas station near Exposition Park in South Los Angeles, 15 miles east of the hotel. He was wearing a backpack, and bought an energy drink. After leaving the store, Nick looked around and then re-entered.

On December 17, the Los Angeles County Department of Medical Examiner released the cause of death for the Reiners; both Rob and Michele's cause of death was multiple sharp force injuries inflicted with a knife, and the manner of death was homicide.

== Arrest and legal proceedings ==
Nick was arrested on the night of December 14 near the University of Southern California. Police initially listed bail at $4 million, before announcing he would instead be held without bail. The case had not yet been presented to prosecutors. Later that day, he was charged by Los Angeles District Attorney Nathan Hochman with two counts of first-degree murder with a special circumstance of multiple murders. Hochman said that they had not yet decided at that time whether to pursue the death penalty.

On December 17, Nick made his first court appearance with his defense attorney Alan Jackson, known for his work as both the prosecuting and defense attorney on cases involving celebrities and other high-profile matters. At his first court appearance, Nick only spoke briefly to a judge, did not enter a plea, and waived his right to a speedy trial after Jackson asked for a continuance regarding Nick's arraignment. He was being held at the Twin Towers Correctional Facility and his arraignment was set for January 7, 2026.

On January 7, during the scheduled arraignment, Jackson withdrew from the case. Nick was then appointed a public defender and his arraignment was subsequently postponed to February 23. Nick pleaded not guilty in court on February 23. He was denied bail and ordered to remain in custody. He was ordered to appear in court again on April 29 for a preliminary hearing. During his April 29 hearing, Nick agreed to a general time waiver, again waiving his right to a speedy trial.

On July 20, 2026, a Los Angeles County grand jury returned an indictment against Nick. It was unsealed on August 12, when he pleaded not guilty to two counts of murder with special circumstance allegations of multiple murders and of murder by means of lying in wait, along with a special allegation that he personally used a deadly weapon, a knife. The indictment allows prosecutors to bypass a preliminary hearing, at which evidence would have been aired publicly. Nick returned to court for a pretrial hearing on September 15, 2026. During the hearing, the prosecution announced that Nick would not face the death penalty.

=== Trust and estate litigation ===
In a separate lawsuit filed June 2026, Nick sought access to an individual trust fund worth $1.5 million to use for his criminal defense. Court filings claimed he was owed the first draw of $558,000 that he did not collect when turned 30. Trustees cited California's "slayer statute," which prohibits individuals responsible for a person's death from benefiting from that person's estate. In October 2026, attorneys agreed to pursue global mediation, initially scheduled for December 2026. Nick was allowed to access limited funds from the trust for use in his prison commissary account.

== Tributes and reaction ==
=== Family and friends ===
Rob and Michele's other two children, Jake and Romy, released a joint statement on December 17, 2025, calling their parents their "best friends".

Close friends and collaborators Albert Brooks, Billy Crystal, Larry David, Martin Short, Barry Levinson, Marc Shaiman, and Alan Zweibel released a joint statement which read in part, "There is no other director who has his range...he was always at the top of his game. He charmed audiences. They trusted him." They also wrote, "Michele and Rob Reiner devoted a great deal of their lives for the betterment of our fellow citizens ... They were a special force together—dynamic, unselfish and inspiring. We were their friends, and we will miss them forever".

Director Martin Scorsese's personal essay remembering Rob and Michele Reiner was published in The New York Times on Christmas Day; he wrote about how he met Reiner through mutual friends in 1970s Los Angeles, regretting the need to use the past tense in describing them, and saying "I loved hanging out with Rob. We had a natural affinity for each other. He was hilarious and sometimes bitingly funny, but he was never the kind of guy who would take over the room."

In January 2026, Mel Brooks, who had been best friends with Rob Reiner's father Carl Reiner, commented at a premiere screening of the documentary Mel Brooks: The 99 Year Old Man!, "Carl, with what's happened, I'm glad that he passed away when he did...I mean, he never could have survived this terrible, terrible thing."

=== Entertainment industry ===
Numerous figures in the entertainment industry also paid tribute to Reiner, including Elwes, Sean Astin, Kevin Bacon, Alec Baldwin, Kathy Bates, Jamie Lee Curtis, John Cusack, Michael Douglas, Beverly Todd, Zooey Deschanel, Jane Fonda, Morgan Freeman, Whoopi Goldberg, Ron Howard, Eric Idle, Stephen King, Jerry Seinfeld, Julia Louis-Dreyfus, Demi Moore, Meg Ryan, Harry Shearer, Ben Stiller, Barbra Streisand, Arnold Schwarzenegger, James Woods, and Robin Wright. Sally Struthers, who played his on-screen wife in All in the Family, called the deaths "beyond devastating."

Cast members from Stand by Me, including Corey Feldman, Jerry O'Connell, and Wil Wheaton, also issued statements remembering Reiner. Late-night hosts including Jimmy Fallon, Jimmy Kimmel, Seth Meyers, and Howard Stern also paid tribute.

At the 98th Academy Awards on March 15, 2026, Billy Crystal honored the Reiners in a tribute alongside friends and actors who had appeared in Rob's films, including Christopher Guest, Cary Elwes, Michael McKean, Mandy Patinkin, Carol Kane, Meg Ryan, Kiefer Sutherland, Demi Moore, Kevin Pollak, Kathy Bates, Wil Wheaton, Annette Bening, John Cusack and Daphne Zuniga.

=== Political figures ===
Los Angeles mayor Karen Bass called Reiner's death a "devastating loss for our city and our country", citing his creative work and advocacy for social justice. California governor Gavin Newsom said he was "heartbroken", praising Reiner's "boundless empathy" and his advocacy for children and civil rights.

Three ex-presidents issued condolences: former US president Bill Clinton released a statement describing the Reiners as friends and praising their public service. The Obamas said that they were "heartbroken", noting Reiner's "deep belief in the goodness of people". Former president Joe Biden and former vice president Kamala Harris also issued statements mourning the couple and praising their character. Political commentator and strategist James Carville described Reiner as "a friend of mine" and also someone who held a huge "cultural impact" on his life.

Journalists paying tribute to Reiner included CNN's Anderson Cooper.

==== Donald Trump ====
President Donald Trump mocked Reiner, writing on Truth Social that "a very sad thing happened" and stating Reiner and his wife died "reportedly due to the anger he caused others through his massive, unyielding, and incurable affliction with a mind crippling disease known as Trump derangement syndrome". Trump's reaction was widely criticized by both Republicans and Democrats; Republican critics included Mike Lawler, Don Bacon, Stephanie Bice, and Thomas Massie. When asked about his post during an event that afternoon, Trump reiterated that Reiner was "very bad for our country" and a "deranged person", accusing him of being one of those behind "the Russia hoax", a reference to the Russia investigation origins conspiracy theory. In protest of Trump's remarks about Reiner, wrestling personality Mick Foley severed all ties to WWE, which Trump has historically had close ties with.

== Media ==
ABC News aired a one-hour special titled The Rob Reiner Story: A Hollywood Tragedy on December 16. On December 21, CNN aired a two-part special, Rob Reiner: His Life and Legacy, the Whole Story, and Rob Reiner: In His Own Words, A Larry King Exclusive, as did CBS News with their news special titled Rob Reiner: Scenes from a Life. A special called TMZ Investigates: The Reiner Murders: What Really Happened was posted on Hulu on January 7, 2026.
