= Jeanine Pirro =

American television host, author and attorney (born 1951)

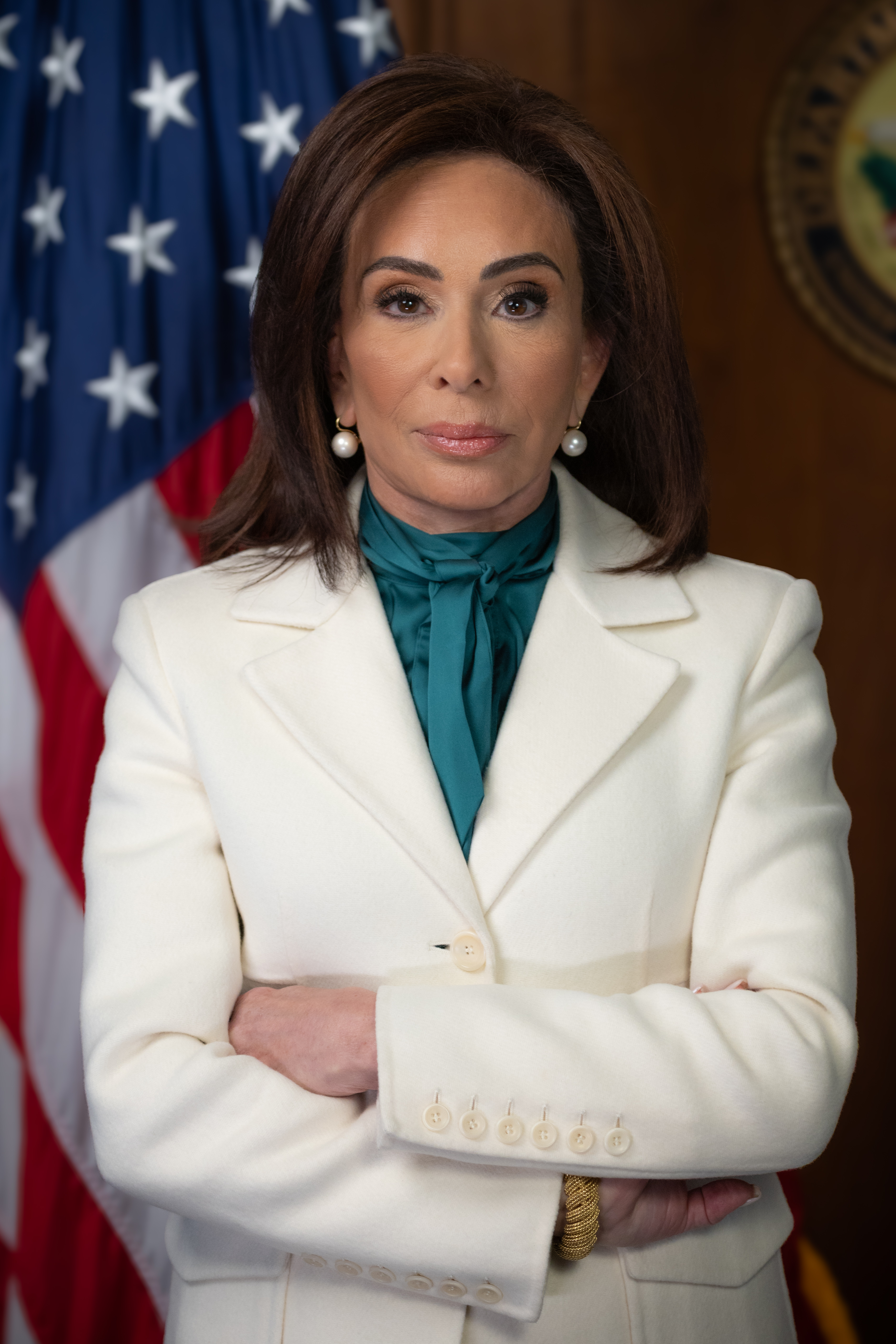
- Official portrait, 2026

United States Attorney for the District of Columbia
- Incumbent
- Assumed office May 14, 2025; Interim: May 14, 2025 – August 2, 2025
- President: Donald Trump
- Preceded by: Ed Martin (interim)

District Attorney of Westchester County
- In office January 1, 1994 – December 31, 2005
- Preceded by: Carl Vergari
- Succeeded by: Janet DiFiore

Judge of the Westchester County Court
- In office January 1, 1991 – May 1993
- Preceded by: Francis Nicolai
- Succeeded by: Daniel Angiolillo; Peter Leavitt

Personal details
- Born: Jeanine Ferris; June 2, 1951 (age 75) Elmira, New York, US
- Party: Republican
- Spouse: Albert Pirro (m. 1975; div. 2013)
- Children: 2
- Education: University at Buffalo (BA); Albany Law School (JD)
- Pirro's voice Pirro on the 2026 White House Correspondents' Dinner shooting Recorded April 27, 2026

Jeanine Ferris Pirro (born June 2, 1951) is an American television host, lawyer, and author who has been serving as the United States attorney for the District of Columbia since May 2025. Pirro is a former judge, prosecutor, and politician in the state of New York.

Pirro was elected as a judge of the Westchester County (New York) Court in 1990. In 1993, she was elected to the position of Westchester County district attorney. She is the first woman to be elected to either of those positions. As district attorney, she gained visibility in cases of domestic abuse and crimes against the elderly. Pirro was re-elected district attorney in 1997 and 2001. She briefly sought the Republican nomination for United States Senate to run against Hillary Clinton in 2006, but dropped out to run as the Republican candidate for New York Attorney General; she lost the general election to Democrat Andrew Cuomo.

From 2008 to 2011, Pirro hosted a weekday television show entitled Judge Jeanine Pirro on The CW. From 2011 to 2022, she hosted Justice with Judge Jeanine on Fox News Channel. She has authored seven books, including Liars, Leakers, and Liberals: The Case Against the Anti-Trump Conspiracy (2018). Following the 2020 presidential election, Pirro made false claims of voting machine fraud. In 2022, she became a co-host of The Five, a position she held until May 2025. She was also a frequent contributor to NBC News, including regular appearances on The Today Show.

Pirro was named as a defendant in a February 2021 defamation lawsuit by Smartmatic. She was among the Fox News hosts named in the Dominion Voting Systems v. Fox News Network defamation lawsuit for broadcasting false statements about the plaintiff company's voting machines. Fox News settled the case for $787.5 million and was required to acknowledge that the broadcast statements were false.

On May 8, 2025, President Trump named her as the interim United States attorney for the District of Columbia to succeed Ed Martin. She was sworn in on May 28, and confirmed to the full position on August 2, 2025.

== Early life ==
Jeanine Ferris was born and raised in Elmira, New York, the daughter of Lebanese-American parents. Both her parents were born in Bsalim in Lebanon before emigrating to the United States. Her father was a mobile-home salesman, and her mother was a department-store model in New York City who spent much of her childhood in Beirut. Her parents were Maronite Catholics. Pirro knew she wanted to be an attorney from the age of six.

She graduated from Notre Dame High School in Elmira in three years, interning in the Chemung County District Attorney's office during her time in high school. Pirro then graduated with a Bachelor of Arts from the University at Buffalo. She received her Juris Doctor degree from Albany Law School in 1975, where she had been an editor of the Albany Law Review.

== Westchester County law career ==
=== Assistant District Attorney ===
In 1975, District Attorney Carl Vergari appointed Pirro to the position of Assistant District Attorney of Westchester County in New York State, where she began her career by writing appeals and handling minor cases. In 1977, Pirro approached Vergari and requested that he apply for a federal grant for local district attorney's offices to establish bureaus that specialized in domestic violence. She hoped that Vergari would take advantage of potential funding, as well as a 1977 change in New York law that moved many domestic violence cases from family court to criminal court. Vergari agreed to apply for the grant, and his office became one of four in the nation to win the grant. In 1978, he appointed Pirro to be the first chief of the new Domestic Violence and Child Abuse Bureau. Pirro was known to be an aggressive bureau chief. Due to possible coercion, she had a strict policy against dropping cases at a victim's request.

On June 1, 1990, just five months prior to Pirro's first appearance on the ballot for County Court Judge, she attracted widespread attention for rushing to conduct a bedside investigation of Maria Amaya at the Intensive Care Unit of United Hospital in Port Chester. Amaya had been charged with four counts of second-degree murder for the deaths of her four children. She was a 36-year-old immigrant from El Salvador who had a history of being hospitalized for mental issues. Amaya had killed the four children and attempted suicide, believing that they were being corrupted by drugs and sex.

While recognized for her prosecution of domestic violence, Pirro was criticized for her relative prosecutorial absence in bringing charges involving major public corruption or organized crime. These criticisms intensified when Pirro's husband was later convicted of several felonies tied to organized crime, including tax evasion and conspiracy. "One would have to believe that there's no organized crime in Westchester County, not a single corrupt official, and every union in this county is as clean as the driven snow," according to William I. Aronwald, who headed the Federal Organized Crime Strike Force during the 1970s.

During an abortive 1986 campaign for Lieutenant Governor of New York, Pirro boasted to have never lost a case in "about 50 trials." This number was disputed when presented in 2005 to colleagues, who said that the real number of trials personally handled by Pirro "wasn't more than 10." Pirro's then-spokesman, Anne Marie Corbalis, contended only that Pirro had a "100% felony conviction rate" as an Assistant District Attorney.

=== County court judge ===
Pirro left the District Attorney's office after her November 1990 election as a judge of the Westchester County Court. She had successfully run on the Republican and Conservative party lines against Democratic nominee and New Castle Town Justice Lawrence D. Lenihan and Right to Life Party nominee August C. Nimphius, Jr. Pirro is the first woman to serve as a judge of the Westchester County Court.

=== District Attorney ===
In November 1993, Pirro was elected Westchester County District Attorney; she is the first woman to hold that position. She was re-elected in 1997 and 2001. On May 23, 2005, Pirro announced that she would not seek re-election to a fourth term as Westchester County District Attorney.

On December 31, 1993—within hours of Pirro's midnight inauguration as District Attorney—Scripps newspaper heiress Anne Scripps Douglas was savagely bludgeoned in the head with a hammer by her estranged husband, Scott Douglas, as she slept in their Bronxville, New York, home. By the time police arrived, Scott Douglas had fled the scene. Anne Scripps Douglas died in the hospital on January 6. Scott Douglas subsequently committed suicide by jumping off the Tappan Zee Bridge. Pirro, already known as a passionate prosecutor of domestic violence cases, was a frequent presence in the media during the period between the murder and when Scott Douglas's body washed ashore in Riverdale in early March 1994. This increase in Pirro's national profile led to her surfacing as a frequent contributor on network and cable television news in June 1994, when O.J. Simpson was arrested for the murder of his ex-wife, appearing frequently as an analyst on Nightline, Larry King Live, and Geraldo.

Within months of taking office, Pirro undertook a costly renovation to the district attorney's facilities and expanded to an additional floor of the county courthouse. The largest expenses were a new kitchenette and a media room, costing $20,000, to assist Pirro's growing profile; additional expenditures were made to remodel her personal office with mahogany.

Pirro was the first female president of the New York State District Attorneys Association. Also while district attorney, she was appointed by then-Governor George Pataki to chair the New York State Commission on Domestic Violence Fatalities. Its report and recommendations resulted in legislation passing that enhanced protections of, and safeguards for, the victims of domestic abuse.

During her tenure as district attorney, she repeatedly refused to reopen the case of the murder of Angela Correa by Jeffrey Deskovic. In 1990, Deskovic was falsely convicted of killing the then-15-year-old Correa, and spent 16 years in prison before he was exonerated by DNA evidence; the real killer eventually confessed to the crime. Deskovic later won a $41.6 million lawsuit against Daniel Stephens and Westchester County for his wrongful conviction.

== Statewide political career ==
=== 1986 lieutenant gubernatorial candidacy ===
On May 26, 1986, Pirro, then an assistant district attorney, was announced as the running mate of Westchester County Executive and presumptive Republican gubernatorial nominee Andrew O'Rourke. Pirro was selected by O'Rourke and New York State Republican Committee Chairman Anthony J. Colavita after nearly a dozen individuals declined the position. Assembly Minority Leader Clarence D. Rappleyea Jr. traveled to the first night of the Republican Committee's nominating convention in Syracuse to tell O'Rourke and Colavita that his conference was concerned about the selection of Pirro. On May 28, 1986, Pirro announced her withdrawal from the race, saying that her husband could not disclose his legal clients or the couple's business interests (later revealed to have been her husband's partial ownership of a Connecticut garbage hauling company with alleged mafia connections), and that many of his clients did business with the state, which would make it "virtually impossible" for her to serve as Lieutenant Governor.

=== 2006 U.S. Senate campaign ===
On August 10, 2005, Pirro announced that she would seek the Republican nomination to challenge first-term incumbent senator Hillary Clinton, a Democrat, in the 2006 election for U.S. Senator from New York. Other Republicans who announced campaigns for the nomination were John Spencer, a former mayor of Yonkers, William Brenner, an attorney in Sullivan County, and attorney Edward Cox, the son-in-law of former president Richard Nixon. In a widely publicized moment when she was declaring her candidacy, Pirro misplaced page 10 of her speech and went silent for 32 seconds, something that was widely considered to have damaged her campaign before it even started.

During an appearance at the Crime Victims Resource Center, Pirro described herself this way: "I am red on fiscal policy. I am conservative and I support the Bush tax cut... I have broad blue stripes when it comes to social issues... I am a woman who is a moderate in New York." Republican governor George Pataki's endorsement of Pirro caused Cox to withdraw from the race, leaving Pirro as the likely nominee. Donors to Pirro's political campaign included designer Tommy Hilfiger (also a native of Elmira) and Donald Trump, as well as contractors and real estate executives who had done business with her husband. Trump spoke highly of her husband at the time, saying: "Al has a good sense of the law and what's practical and a lot of common sense."

On December 21, 2005, Pirro dropped out of the Senate race after continuing pressure from party chiefs. This decision was reached after a lagging fundraising effort, and polls that showed she would be easily defeated by Clinton (a Quinnipiac University poll forecast Pirro would lose to Clinton 62 percent to 30 percent). In a statement, she said, "I have decided that my law enforcement background better qualifies me for a race for New York State attorney general than a race for the United States Senate." Spencer was eventually chosen as the Republican Party's nominee for the U.S. Senate.

During her four-month campaign, the Pirro campaign racked up $600,000 in debt to campaign vendors. By 2019, debts to vendors remained unpaid.

=== 2006 state attorney general campaign ===
On May 31, 2006, Pirro was unopposed for the nomination and became the Republican Party's official candidate for Attorney General of New York by acclamation at the state GOP convention. She also received the nominations of the New York Conservative and Independence Parties. Pirro lost the general election to the Democratic nominee, former Clinton Housing and Urban Development Secretary and future Governor Andrew Cuomo, 58%–39%.

== United States Attorney for the District of Columbia ==
On May 8, 2025, President Trump named her as the interim United States attorney for the District of Columbia to succeed Ed Martin. She was sworn in on May 28, and confirmed to the full position on August 2, 2025.

On January 9, 2026, her office served the Federal Reserve with grand jury subpoenas, threatening a criminal indictment related to the testimony of Jerome Powell, the Chair of the Federal Reserve before the Senate Banking Committee in June 2025. That testimony concerned in part a multi-year project to renovate historic Federal Reserve office buildings. The criminal investigation was reportedly met with disapproval by the White House and numerous Republican senators, while Treasury Secretary Scott Bessent expressed his frustration over it. Powell issued a statement concerning the subpoenas, characterizing the probe as "pressure [by the Oval Office] to [force the Fed to] lower interest rates." On April 24, 2026, Pirro's office released a statement on X announcing that the criminal investigation of Jerome Powell "is over." Instead, the statement added, it was agreed that the Fed's inspector general would "scrutinize" the ostensibly "significant cost-overruns" and submit a report.

== Books ==
Pirro has written a number of books. To Punish and Protect: A DA's Fight Against a System That Coddles Criminals (2003) is a collection of essays described by Publishers Weekly as "serv[ing] several purposes: to stoke public consciousness of crime and contempt for criminals, to mobilize support for toughening the penal laws and to position the author as a remorselessly angry crusader."

In 2012, with the assistance of author Pete Earley, Pirro wrote the novel Sly Fox based on her own experiences as a 25-year-old assistant district attorney in Westchester. Sly Fox was followed in 2014 by the second novel in the series, Clever Fox: A Dani Fox Novel.

Pirro's book Liars, Leakers, and Liberals: The Case Against the Anti-Trump Conspiracy (2018) is a look inside the first-term presidency of Donald Trump, as well as the politics surrounding the anti-Trump movement. In April 2018, Trump posed with Pirro and Liars, Leakers, and Liberals in the Oval Office. Washington Post book critic Carlos Lozada described the book as a "sycophantic" and "gushing" pro-Trump book. PolitiFact found that Pirro's assertion in the book that Deputy Attorney General Rod Rosenstein had announced in February 2018 that "the Russia collusion investigation is over" was false; Rosenstein never said it, and the progression of the Russia probe since February 2018 demonstrated otherwise.

Pirro's Radicals, Resistance, and Revenge: The Left's Plot to Remake America (2019) is described by its publisher as exposing "the latest chapter in the unfolding liberal attack on our most basic values." Her book Don't Lie to Me: and Stop Trying to Steal Our Freedom was published on September 23, 2020.

== Media career ==
Pirro has been a regular contributor to the syndicated morning talk show The Morning Show with Mike and Juliet. She has been a guest analyst on Today, Fox NY Good Day New York. She is a Fox News legal analyst appearing on various shows, and has guest-hosted shows such as Larry King Live, The Joy Behar Show, and Geraldo at Large. She was a frequent guest on Fox's late-night satire show Red Eye w/ Greg Gutfeld.

Pirro appeared in the HBO six-part serial The Jinx, recounting her perspective on the 1983 disappearance of Kathie Durst, a high-profile case for which she was the investigating attorney. Pirro was the host of the American reality prime time court show You the Jury, canceled after two episodes.

=== Judge Jeanine Pirro on The CW ===
On May 5, 2008, The CW Television Network announced that Pirro would host a weekday television show to be named Judge Jeanine Pirro, part of the network's CW Daytime lineup, with two episodes airing daily. The show was distributed by Warner Bros. Domestic Television, and was carried by default on all CW affiliate stations.

Judge Jeanine Pirro was cleared for a second season beginning in fall 2009. Unlike its first season, the second season, which began in the fall of 2009, was not exclusive to CW affiliates. In 2010 the show was nominated for Outstanding Legal/Courtroom Program at the 37th Daytime Emmy Awards, and in 2011 it won that category at the 38th Daytime Emmy Awards. In September 2011 the show was canceled due to low ratings.

=== Justice with Judge Jeanine on Fox News ===
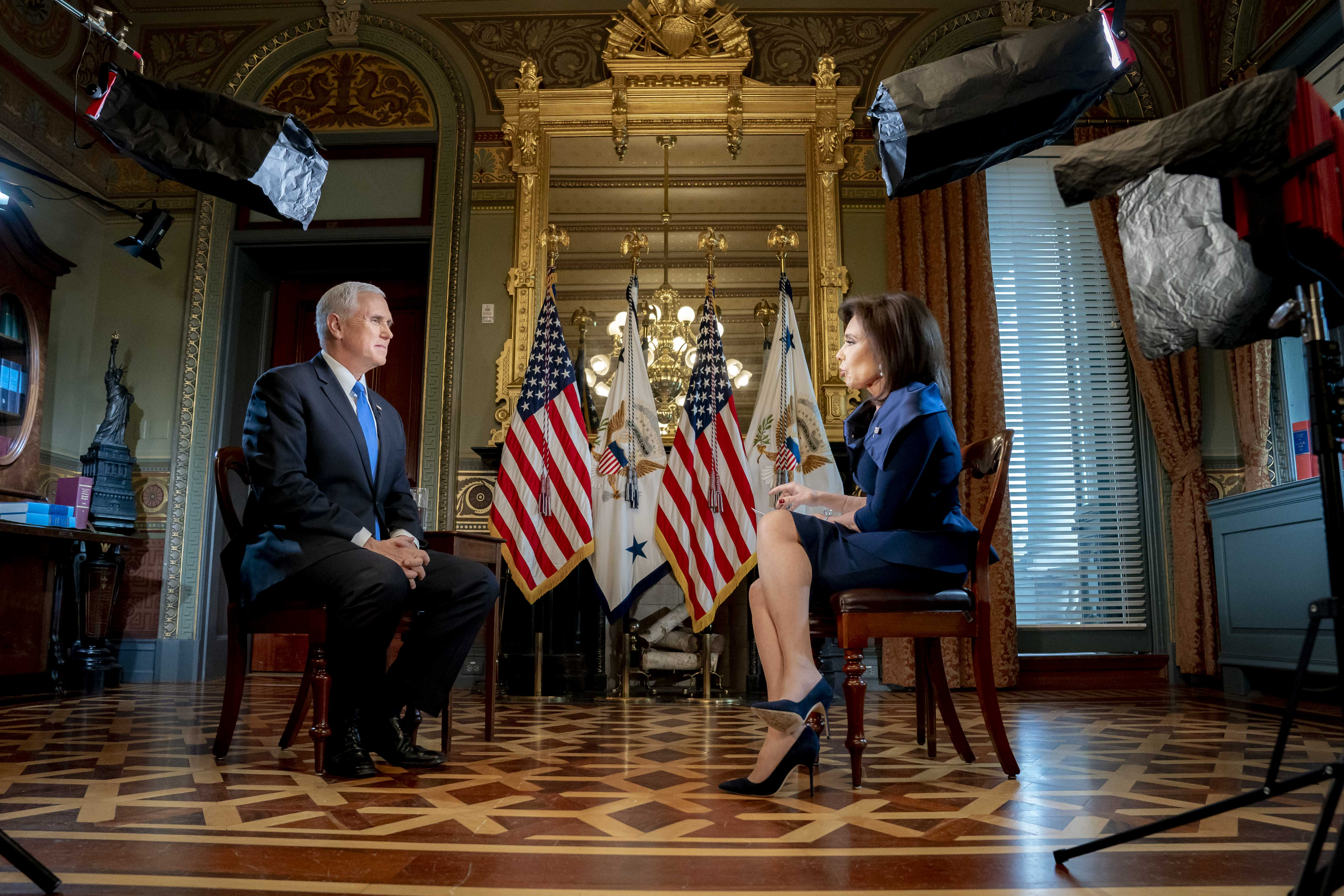
Pirro interviewing Vice President Mike Pence in December 2019

Pirro was the host of Fox News' Justice with Judge Jeanine, which premiered in January 2011 and concluded on January 22, 2022. The program aired on weekends and focuses on the big legal stories of the week.

In 2014, Pirro claimed ISIL leader Abu Bakr al-Baghdadi was "released by Obama in 2009". However, Baghdadi was held in custody until 2004, when he was released under the Bush administration.

In March 2019, on her show Justice with Judge Jeanine Pirro criticized Rep. Ilhan Omar for questioning the loyalty of American Jews to the US, by suggesting that Omar's Muslim faith meant she was more loyal to Sharia law than the US Constitution. Pirro said, "Omar wears a hijab which according to the Quran 33:59 tells women to cover so they won't get molested. Is her adherence to this Islamic doctrine indicative of her adherence to Sharia law, which in itself is antithetical to the United States constitution?" Fox News strongly condemned Pirro's statement. Pirro did not apologize for her remarks, and said that she intended to "start a debate." On March 16, 2019, Fox News decided not to air her show, replacing it with a rebroadcast of a Scandalous episode in its time slot. CNN reported on March 17 that Pirro had been suspended by Fox News, and President Trump wrote on Twitter: "Bring back @JudgeJeanine Pirro. Stop working soooo hard on being politically correct, which will only bring you down, and continue to fight for our Country." Justice with Judge Jeanine resumed airing on March 30, 2019.

In March 2020, she hosted the show from home due to the COVID-19 pandemic. She did not appear on air for the first 15 minutes citing "technical difficulties", with Jackie Ibañez covering for her, and when Pirro finally appeared, she was in a disheveled state, slurring her speech, causing widespread speculation that she was inebriated. After one commercial break, she was even seen putting aside a drink with a straw.

After the 2020 United States presidential election, Pirro was an outspoken proponent on her program of baseless allegations involving voting machine fraud that allegedly stole the election from Donald Trump. Hosts Lou Dobbs and Maria Bartiromo also promoted falsehoods on their programs. Smartmatic, a voting machine company that had been baselessly accused of conspiring with competitor Dominion Voting Systems to rig the election, sent Fox News a letter in December 2020 demanding retractions that "must be published on multiple occasions" so as to "match the attention and audience targeted with the original defamatory publications." The three programs each ran the same video segment refuting the baseless allegations days later, though none of the three hosts personally issued retractions. Pirro was among Fox News employees named in a February 2021 Smartmatic defamation suit; a judge dismissed her from the suit in March 2022, but an appeals court reinstated her as a defendant in February 2023. On February 4, 2021, Pirro was named in the complaint "Smartmatic Files $2.7 Billion Defamation Lawsuit Against Fox Corporation" The complaint states that "Fox News’ disinformation campaign had a direct and harmful impact on Smartmatic's ability to conduct business in the United States and around the world". Smartmatic claims that Fox News Network, Maria Bartiromo, Lou Dobbs, Jeanine Pirro, Rudy Giuliani and Sidney Powell were primary sources of false information which were repeated by other media outlets, journalists, bloggers and influencers the world over.

On January 12, 2022, it was announced that Pirro would be a permanent co-host on The Five starting January 24, and ending Justice. Pirro left Fox News in May 2025.

== Political positions ==
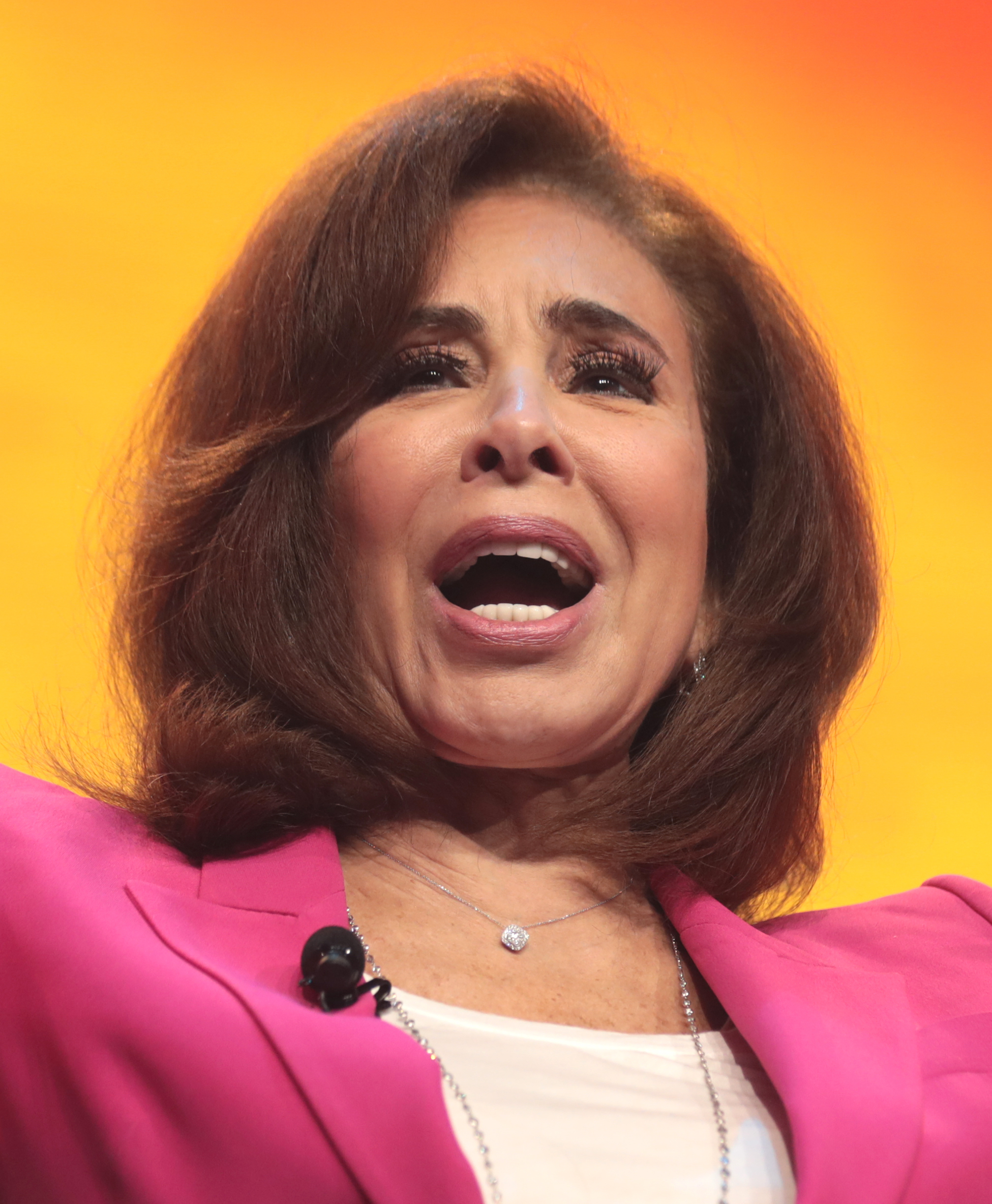
Pirro speaking at a Turning Point USA event in 2020

=== Trump administrations ===
Pirro supported Donald Trump in the 2016 presidential race, while also noting that she was "infuriated" by some of his behaviors. After the release of the Access Hollywood tape, Pirro defended Trump, stating "I have been involved in a million situations with him and his children. He has always been a gentleman."

After Trump's election, Pirro was known for delivering fiery defenses of the president. The Washington Post described her show as "almost universally positive about Trump," and Politico described her coverage of Trump as "gushing." According to Politico, "From the outset of the administration, she has used her TV platform to hammer the president's critics and to ding his allies, including [Jeff] Sessions, as insufficiently loyal."

In her televised programs and in private meetings with Trump at the White House, Pirro "steadfastly encouraged Trump to press harder on his agenda of disruption and provocation." In 2017, Pirro called for the arrest of individuals who cooperated with special counsel Robert S. Mueller III's investigation into Russian interference in the 2016 election in favor of Trump. Pirro called for government agencies to be "cleansed" of critics of the president; she called for Deputy FBI Director Andrew McCabe and Peter Strzok to be arrested, and appeared to suggest that Mueller, former FBI director James B. Comey, and Associate Deputy Attorney General Bruce Ohr all be arrested as well. Pirro's comments were part of a broader push by Trump's allies in the media to delegitimize the Mueller probe and other investigations into Trump and his administration.

In February 2018, after two senior Trump administration officials resigned due to domestic abuse allegations, Pirro suggested that former president Barack Obama was to blame for the two domestic abuse scandals, without clarifying how.

In May 2018, Pirro said that Trump had "fulfilled the biblical prophecy" by moving the US embassy in Israel to Jerusalem.

In June 2018, Pirro said Trump's pardon of conservative activist Dinesh D'Souza, who was convicted of "illegal campaign contributions" to a college friend was "fantastic news", as she believes D'Souza was singled out for prosecution for his politics by the FBI for having produced two political documentary movies: Hillary's America and Obama's America. On her show, Pirro had referred to Attorney General Jeff Sessions as "the most dangerous man in America."

In July 2018, after Trump was widely criticized, including by numerous prominent conservatives, for refusing to condemn Russian interference in the 2016 election while standing onstage with Vladimir Putin in Helsinki, Pirro defended Trump. Pirro said, "What was he supposed to do, take a gun out and shoot Putin?"

In November 2019, she described Trump as "almost superhuman". In December 2019, she suggested that Trump had made it possible for people to say "Merry Christmas" again.

In February 2020, Pirro predicted that the impeachment of Donald Trump would be so unpopular that Democrats would lose their majority in the U.S. House of Representatives in the 2020 elections (which ultimately did not occur); Politico named Pirro's prediction one of "the most audacious, confident and spectacularly incorrect prognostications about the year".

In May 2025, President Trump named Pirro as Acting United States Attorney for the District of Columbia, replacing embattled Acting US Attorney Ed Martin. She was confirmed by the Senate on August 2.

=== Health care ===
Describing her own political positions in 2005, Pirro said, "I'm Republican red on fiscal policy with conservative beliefs on making tax cuts permanent, but I've got broad blue stripes on the social issues," during her campaign for the US Senate in New York. Her positions were described as politically moderate during her Senate run. Pirro supported a woman's right to an abortion, including U.S. taxpayer funding of abortion through Medicaid in 2005, though she has been opposed to late-term abortions.

=== LGBT rights ===
On the topic of LGBT rights, Pirro actively supported the passing of a New York hate crimes law which covered sexual orientation as a protected class in 2000. She was outspoken in her support for anti-discrimination protections for LGBT people, as well as civil unions for same-sex couples, during her 2006 campaign for State Attorney General. Though she did not support same-sex marriage, she opposed attempts to amend the U.S. Constitution and New York state constitution to ban it, claiming: "Make no mistake, if it does become the law of this state, I will fight to defend it". That year, she participated in a Pride Parade and in a Log Cabin Republicans political fundraising event; the Log Cabin Republicans endorsed her. Eight years later, on her program, she interviewed William Owens, a representative of the National Organization for Marriage and opponent of same-sex marriage. In November 2021, Pirro attended the Log Cabin Republicans' "Spirit of Lincoln Award" event.

=== Benghazi ===
In 2014, Pirro called for the impeachment of Barack Obama over the 2012 Benghazi attack.

=== Second Amendment ===
Of gun ownership, Pirro stated in 2004: "I believe in the Second Amendment strongly, but there is no legitimate purpose in possessing an assault weapon other than to kill as many people as quickly as possible."

Pirro commented in December 2015:

Get a gun, buy one legally, learn how to shoot it and be primed to use it. And, I don't care if you get a long gun, a hand gun, a revolver or a semi automatic. Get whatever gun you can handle and don't let anyone talk you out of it. The Second Amendment of the Constitution and the United States Supreme Court confirm your right to have one.

In February 2026, in the wake of Alex Pretti's killing, she shifted tone and threatened anyone who brings a gun into Washington, D.C. with jail, regardless of having a license elsewhere.

== Personal life ==
Pirro has two children with her former spouse Albert. Following their marriage, they moved to Harrison, New York, where Pirro began working as assistant district attorney and her husband began work as a lobbyist. Later in their marriage, but before their children were born, Albert was accused of fathering a daughter by a Florida woman he termed as extortionate and mentally unstable. After his denials and extensive court proceedings, DNA testing confirmed him as the father, and he was ordered to begin child support payments in 1998.

In 1997, People magazine named Pirro one of its "50 Most Beautiful People".

On February 23, 1999, Pirro's husband was indicted on one count of conspiracy, four counts of tax evasion, and 28 counts of filing a false tax return for hiding over $1 million in personal income as business expenses between 1988 and 1997. That day, Pirro appeared with her husband at a press conference in response to the charges, criticizing the investigation as "invasive and hostile." On June 23, 2000, a jury found Pirro's husband guilty of 23 of the charges brought against him and not guilty of 10 others. He served 17 months in prison, being released early for good behavior and participating in an alcoholism treatment program. In the midst of the trial, Jeanine Pirro had attacked the prosecution for bringing up matters which involved her, calling it a "desperate attempt by them to bring me into this wherever they can." Albert Pirro was pardoned by President Donald Trump on January 20, 2021, shortly before Trump left office.

As a result of their "tumultuous" relationship, Pirro and her husband separated in 2007, with their divorce being finalized in 2013.

In November 2017, Pirro was charged with speeding for driving 119 miles per hour (192 km/h) in upstate New York.

In July 2019, Pirro was named to the board of directors of the cannabis company HeavenlyRx, which manufactures CBD products. Said Pirro: "My interest in CBD stems from a curiosity after hearing people say how much they benefited from CBD.... Initially a skeptic, I now understand there are tremendous benefits outside the assembly line of traditional medical and pharmaceutical dictates".

Pirro revealed in her 2018 book, Liars, Leakers, and Liberals: The Case Against the Anti-Trump Conspiracy, that she was diagnosed with cancer in 2012. She is a practicing Catholic.

Party political offices
Preceded by Dora Irizarry	Republican nominee for Attorney General of New York; 2006	Succeeded by Dan Donovan
