= Justice with Judge Jeanine =

Television series

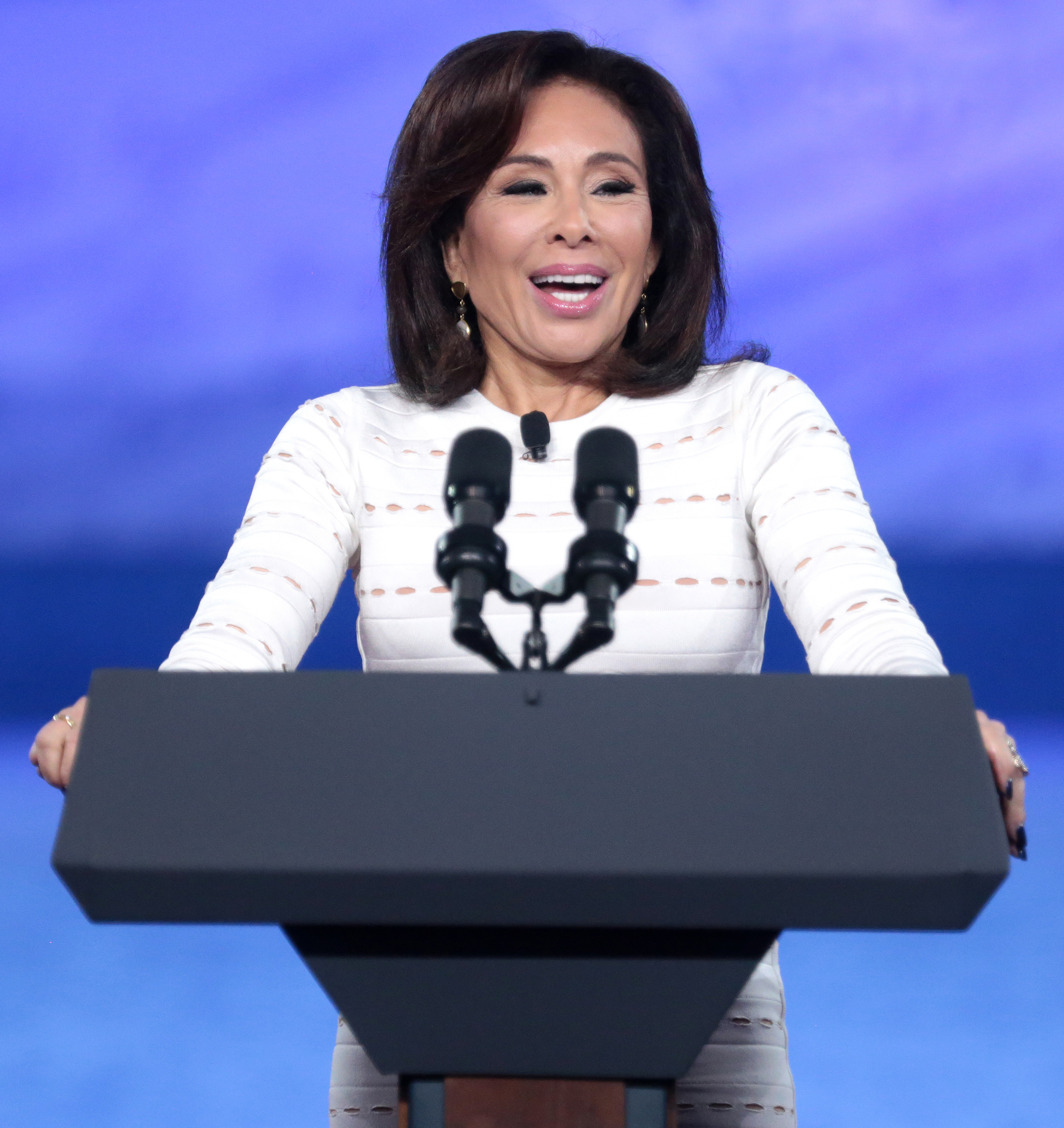
- Genre: Reality legal show
- Starring: Jeanine Pirro
- Country of origin: United States
- Original language: English

Production
- Production locations: 1211 Avenue of the Americas; Manhattan, New York City, New York, U.S.
- Camera setup: Multi-camera
- Running time: 60 minutes
- Production company: Fox News

Original release
- Network: Fox News
- Release: January 1, 2011 – January 22, 2022

Justice with Judge Jeanine was a Fox News legal and current events program hosted by former district attorney and judge Jeanine Pirro.

The show aired live on Saturdays at 9 pm Eastern Time. The show presents Pirro's legal insights on the news of the week leading up to the show, high-profile cases and other recent news, trends and issues within the scope of politics, crime, and justice. The show premiered on January 1, 2011.

On March 9, 2019, Pirro was suspended amid heavy criticism after claiming U.S. Representative Ilhan Omar's hijab may be "antithetical to the Constitution". The scheduled March 16, 2019, show was replaced with a rerun of a Scandalous episode in its time slot. The next day, President Donald Trump tweeted that Fox News should "bring back" Pirro's show. The scheduled March 23, 2019, show was replaced with a special about the Mueller Report, hosted by Ed Henry. The show was reinstated on March 30, 2019.

On January 12, 2022, it was announced that the series would end on January 22 as Pirro becomes a co-host of The Five.

Some statements made by Jeanine on the show were the subject of the Dominion v. Fox News Network lawsuit.
