= List of programs broadcast by Fox News =

Fox News presents a variety of programming with up to 20 hours of live programming per day. Most of the programs are broadcast from Fox News headquarters in New York City in their street-side studio on Sixth Avenue in the west extension of Rockefeller Center. The network's other programs are broadcast from Fox News' studio in Washington, D.C., located on Capitol Hill across from Union Station, as well as in the Fox News Texas Studios in Las Colinas, Irving, Texas and Los Angeles, California. Audio simulcasts of the channel are aired on XM Satellite Radio and Sirius Satellite Radio. Fox News also hosts a website with a number of political columnists and weblogs.

Hard-news programming currently broadcasts at:

- Weekdays: 9:00am–11:00am / 1:00pm–4:00pm / 6:00pm-7:00pm / 11:00pm-11:55pm
- Saturday: 12:00pm–2:00pm / 3:00pm–5:00pm
- Sunday: 12:00pm–2:00pm / 3:00pm–5:00pm

== Current shows ==
=== Weekdays ===
Times (ET/PT)	Program	Hosted by	Debut	Description	Studios
12:00am ET/9:00pm PT	The Five (repeat) (T-F only)	Greg Gutfeld, Dana Perino, Jesse Watters, Emily Compagno, Jessica Tarlov, and Harold Ford Jr.	July 11, 2011	Panel discussion program.	Studio M, New York City
1:00am ET/10:00pm PT	Jesse Watters Primetime (repeat) (T-F only)	Jesse Watters	January 24, 2022	Evening talk program with a conservative/libertarian viewpoint.	Studio M, New York City
2:00am ET/11:00pm PT	Hannity (repeat) (T-F only)	Sean Hannity	January 12, 2009	Political issues of the day from a fiscally and culturally conservative point of view.	Florida
3:00am ET/12:00am PT	Gutfeld! (repeat) (T-F only)	Greg Gutfeld, with Kat Timpf and Tyrus	April 5, 2021	Panel talk show featuring snarky commentary and humor.	Studio D, New York City
4:00am ET/1:00am PT	Fox News @ Night (repeat) (T-F only)	Trace Gallagher	October 30, 2017	Late night news/interview program.	Fox News Los Angeles Bureau
5:00am ET/2:00am PT	Fox & Friends First	Carley Shimkus and Todd Piro	March 5, 2012	Early morning news/talk program.	Studio J, New York City
6:00am ET/3:00am PT	Fox & Friends	Ainsley Earhardt, Brian Kilmeade, and Lawrence Jones	February 1, 1998	The network's flagship morning news/talk program.	Studio M, New York City
7:00am ET/4:00am PT	Fox & Friends	Ainsley Earhardt, Brian Kilmeade, and Lawrence Jones	February 1, 1998	The network's flagship morning news/talk program.	Studio M, New York City
8:00am ET/5:00am PT	Fox & Friends	Ainsley Earhardt, Brian Kilmeade, and Lawrence Jones	February 1, 1998	The network's flagship morning news/talk program.	Studio M, New York City
9:00am ET/6:00am PT	America's Newsroom	Bill Hemmer and Dana Perino	February 12, 2007	Late morning news/interview program.	Studio E, New York City
10:00am ET/7:00am PT	America's Newsroom	Bill Hemmer and Dana Perino	February 12, 2007	Late morning news/interview program.	Studio E, New York City
11:00am ET/8:00am PT	The Faulkner Focus	Harris Faulkner	January 18, 2021	Midday news/interview program.	Studio M, New York City
12:00pm ET/9:00am PT	Outnumbered	Harris Faulkner, Kayleigh McEnany, and various guest panelists.	April 28, 2014	Afternoon panel discussion program.	Studio M, New York City
1:00pm ET/10:00am PT	America Reports	John Roberts and Sandra Smith	January 18, 2021	Afternoon news/interview program.	Studio N, New York City & Studio 2, Washington, D.C.
2:00pm ET/11:00am PT	America Reports	John Roberts and Sandra Smith	January 18, 2021	Afternoon news/interview program.	Studio N, New York City & Studio 2, Washington, D.C.
3:00pm ET/12:00pm PT	The Story with Martha MacCallum	Martha MacCallum	January 9, 2017	News analysis and newsmaker interviews.	Studio M, New York City
4:00pm ET/1:00pm PT	The Will Cain Show	Will Cain	January 21, 2025	Political news and discussion program.	Dallas, TX
5:00pm ET/2:00pm PT	The Five	Greg Gutfeld, Dana Perino, Jesse Watters, Emily Compagno, Jessica Tarlov, and Harold Ford Jr.	July 11, 2011	Panel discussion program.	Studio M, New York City
6:00pm ET/3:00pm PT	Special Report	Bret Baier	January 26, 1998	Political news and discussion program.	Studio 1, Washington, D.C.
7:00pm ET/4:00pm PT	The Ingraham Angle	Laura Ingraham	October 30, 2017	Evening political/pop culture talk program.	Studio 2, Washington, D.C.
8:00pm ET/5:00pm PT	Jesse Watters Primetime	Jesse Watters	January 24, 2022	Evening talk program with a conservative/libertarian viewpoint.	Studio M, New York City
9:00pm ET/6:00pm PT	Hannity	Sean Hannity	January 12, 2009	Political issues of the day from a fiscally and culturally conservative point of view.	Florida
10:00pm ET/7:00pm PT	Gutfeld!	Greg Gutfeld, Kat Timpf, Tyrus, and various guest panelists	April 5, 2021	Panel show featuring snarky commentary and humor; pre-empted by an extra hour of Hannity or Fox News @ Night in the event of breaking news.	Studio D, New York City
11:00pm ET/8:00pm PT	Fox News @ Night	Trace Gallagher	October 30, 2017	Late night news/interview program.	Fox News Los Angeles Bureau
=== Saturdays ===
Times	Program	Hosted by		Description	Studios
12:00am ET/9:00pm PT	The Five (repeat)	Greg Gutfeld, Dana Perino, Jesse Watters, Emily Compagno, Jessica Tarlov, and Harold Ford Jr.	July 11, 2011	Panel discussion program.	Studio M, New York City
1:00am ET/10:00pm PT	Jesse Watters Primetime (repeat)	Jesse Watters	January 24, 2022	Evening talk program with a conservative/libertarian viewpoint.	Studio M, New York City
2:00am ET/11:00pm PT	Hannity (repeat)	Sean Hannity	January 12, 2009	Political issues of the day from a fiscally and culturally conservative point of view.	Studio J, New York City
3:00am ET/12:00am PT	Gutfeld! (repeat)	Greg Gutfeld, Kat Timpf, Tyrus, and various guest panelists	April 5, 2021	Panel talk show featuring snarky commentary and humor.	Studio D, New York City
4:00am ET/1:00am PT	Fox News @ Night (repeat) (T-F only)	Trace Gallagher	October 30, 2017	Late night news/interview program.	Fox News Los Angeles Bureau
5:00am ET/2:00am PT	The Five (repeat)	Greg Gutfeld, Dana Perino, Jesse Watters, Emily Compagno, Jessica Tarlov, and Harold Ford Jr.	July 11, 2011	Roundtable discussion program.	Studio M, New York City
6:00am ET/3:00am PT	Fox & Friends Weekend	Rachel Campos-Duffy, Charles Hurt, Griff Jenkins	February 1, 1998	The network's weekend morning news/talk program.	Studio M, New York City
7:00am ET/4:00am PT	Fox & Friends Weekend	Rachel Campos-Duffy, Charles Hurt, Griff Jenkins	February 1, 1998	The network's weekend morning news/talk program.	Studio M, New York City
8:00am ET/5:00am PT	Fox & Friends Weekend	Rachel Campos-Duffy, Charles Hurt, Griff Jenkins	February 1, 1998	The network's weekend morning news/talk program.	Studio M, New York City
9:00am ET/6:00am PT	Fox & Friends Weekend	Rachel Campos-Duffy, Charles Hurt, Griff Jenkins	February 1, 1998	The network's weekend morning news/talk program.	Studio M, New York City
10:00am ET/7:00am PT	Saturday in America with Kayleigh McEnany	Kayleigh McEnany	September 20, 2025	Perspective and interviews on the latest legal and political news.	Studio M, New York City
11:00am ET/8:00am PT	Saturday in America with Kayleigh McEnany	Kayleigh McEnany	September 20, 2025	Perspective and interviews on the latest legal and political news.	Studio M, New York City
12:00pm ET/9:00am PT	Fox News Live with Aishah Hasnie	Aishah Hasnie	January 10, 2026	News programing; Perspective and interviews on the latest legal and political news.	Studio 1, Washington, D.C.
1:00pm ET/10:00am PT	Fox News Live with Aishah Hasnie	Aishah Hasnie	January 10, 2026	News programing; Perspective and interviews on the latest legal and political news.	Studio 1, Washington, D.C.
2:00pm ET/11:00am PT	The Journal Editorial Report	Paul Gigot	2005 (moved from PBS)	The editorial-board members of the Wall Street Journal debate and discuss news, society and politics.	Studio E, New York City
3:00pm ET/12:00pm PT	Fox Report with Jon Scott	Jon Scott	September 13, 1999	News program.	Studio G, New York City
4:00pm ET/1:00pm PT	Fox Report with Jon Scott	Jon Scott	September 13, 1999	News program.	Studio G, New York City
5:00pm ET/2:00pm PT	The Big Weekend Show	Johnny Joey Jones, Tomi Lahren, Various guest hosts	June 3, 2023	Panel discussion program featuring various Fox News contributors.	Various
6:00pm ET/3:00pm PT	The Big Weekend Show	Johnny Joey Jones, Tomi Lahren, Various guest hosts	June 3, 2023	Panel discussion program featuring various Fox News contributors.	Various
7:00pm ET/4:00pm PT	The Big Weekend Show	Johnny Joey Jones, Tomi Lahren, Various guest hosts	June 3, 2023	Panel discussion program featuring various Fox News contributors.	Various
8:00pm ET/5:00pm PT	Life, Liberty & Levin	Mark Levin	February 25, 2018	Conservative talk program.	Washington DC
9:00pm ET/6:00pm PT	My View with Lara Trump	Lara Trump	February 22, 2025	Perspective and interviews on the latest legal and political news.	
10:00pm ET/7:00pm PT	Fox News Saturday Night	Jimmy Failla	January 13, 2024	Comedic commentary on cultural, political, and lifestyle issues.	Studio D, New York City
11:00pm ET/8:00pm PT	Gutfeld! (repeat)	Greg Gutfeld, Kat Timpf and Tyrus	April 5, 2021	Late night talk show featuring snarky commentary and humor.	Studio D, New York City
=== Sundays ===
Times	Program	Hosted by		Description	Studios
12:00am ET/9:00pm PT	Life, Liberty & Levin (repeat)	Mark Levin	February 25, 2018	Conservative talk program.	Washington DC
1:00am ET/10:00pm PT	My View with Lara Trump (repeat)	Lara Trump	February 22, 2025		
2:00am ET/11:00pm PT	Fox News Saturday Night (repeat)	Jimmy Failla	January 13, 2024	FOX News Saturday Night delivers comedic commentary on cultural, political and lifestyle issues with host Jimmy Fallia alongside rotating FOX News personalities and a wide range of guests.	Studio D, New York City
3:00am ET/12:00am PT	Life, Liberty & Levin (repeat)	Mark Levin	February 25, 2018	Conservative talk program.	Washington DC
4:00am ET/1:00am PT	My View with Lara Trump (repeat)	Lara Trump	February 22, 2025	Perspective and interviews on the latest legal and political news.	
5:00am ET/2:00am PT	Fox News Saturday Night (repeat)	Jimmy Failla	January 13, 2024	FOX News Saturday Night delivers comedic commentary on cultural, political and lifestyle issues with host Jimmy Fallia alongside rotating FOX News personalities and a wide range of guests.	Studio D, New York City
6:00am ET/3:00am PT	Fox & Friends Weekend	Rachel Campos-Duffy, Charles Hurt, Griff Jenkins	February 1, 1998	The network's weekend morning news/talk program.	Studio M, New York City
7:00am ET/4:00am PT	Fox & Friends Weekend	Rachel Campos-Duffy, Charles Hurt, Griff Jenkins	February 1, 1998	The network's weekend morning news/talk program.	Studio M, New York City
8:00am ET/5:00am PT	Fox & Friends Weekend	Rachel Campos-Duffy, Charles Hurt, Griff Jenkins	February 1, 1998	The network's weekend morning news/talk program.	Studio M, New York City
9:00am ET/6:00am PT	Fox & Friends Weekend	Rachel Campos-Duffy, Charles Hurt, Griff Jenkins	February 1, 1998	The network's weekend morning news/talk program.	Studio M, New York City
10:00am ET/7:00am PT	Sunday Morning Futures	Larry Kudlow (through at least Sunday November 8, 2026)	March 30, 2014	Interviewing business leaders and newsmakers.	Studio J, New York City
11:00am ET/8:00am PT	The Sunday Briefing	Peter Doocy and Jacqui Heinrich (rotating bi-weekly)	September 21, 2025		Washington, D.C.
12:00pm ET/9:00am PT	Fox News Live	Various	1999	Weekend hard news program.	Studio J, New York City
1:00pm ET/10:00am PT	Fox News Live	Various	1999	Weekend hard news program.	Studio 2, Washington, D.C.
2:00pm ET/11:00am PT	Fox News Sunday (repeat)	Shannon Bream	April 28, 1996	Sunday public and political talk show. Airs live at 9:00am ET on the Fox Broadcasting Company.	Studio 1, Washington, D.C.
3:00pm ET/12:00pm PT	Fox Report with Jon Scott	Jon Scott	September 13, 1999	News program.	Studio G, New York City
4:00pm ET/1:00pm PT	Fox Report with Jon Scott	Jon Scott	September 13, 1999	News program.	Studio G, New York City
5:00pm ET/2:00pm PT	The Big Weekend Show	Johnny Joey Jones, Tomi Lahren, Various guest hosts	June 3, 2023	Panel discussion program featuring various Fox News contributors.	Various
6:00pm ET/3:00pm PT	The Big Weekend Show	Johnny Joey Jones, Tomi Lahren, Various guest hosts	June 3, 2023	Panel discussion program featuring various Fox News contributors.	Various
7:00pm ET/4:00pm PT	The Big Weekend Show	Johnny Joey Jones, Tomi Lahren, Various guest hosts	June 3, 2023	Panel discussion program featuring various Fox News contributors.	Various
8:00pm ET/5:00pm PT	Life, Liberty & Levin	Mark Levin	February 25, 2018	Conservative talk program.	Washington, D.C.
9:00pm ET/6:00pm PT	Sunday Night in America with Trey Gowdy	Trey Gowdy	June 6, 2021	Perspective and interviews on the latest legal and political news.	Spartanburg, South Carolina
10:00pm ET/7:00pm PT	One Nation with Brian Kilmeade	Brian Kilmeade	January 29, 2022	Politics and pop culture.	Studio K, New York City
11:00pm ET/8:00pm PT	Life, Liberty & Levin (repeat)	Mark Levin	February 25, 2018	Conservative talk program.	Washington, D.C.
12:00am ET/9:00pm PT	Sunday Night in America with Trey Gowdy (repeat) (Monday Morning)	Trey Gowdy	June 6, 2021		
1:00am ET/10:00pm PT	One Nation with Brian Kilmeade (repeat) (Monday Morning)	Brian Kilmeade	January 29, 2022	Politics and pop culture.	Studio K, New York City
2:00am ET/11:00pm PT	Fox News Sunday (repeat) (Monday Morning)	Shannon Bream	April 28, 1996	Sunday public and political talk show. Airs live at 9:00am ET on the Fox Broadcasting Company.	Studio 1, Washington, D.C.
3:00am ET/12:00am PT	Life, Liberty & Levin (repeat) (Monday Morning)	Mark Levin	February 25, 2018	Conservative talk program.	Washington, D.C.
4:00am ET/1:00am PT	Sunday Night in America with Trey Gowdy (repeat) (Monday Morning)	Trey Gowdy	June 6, 2021		

=== Special programming ===
- All American New Year, the network's annual New Year's celebration program
- America's Election Headquarters, the network's biennial campaign and election coverage, culminating with Election Night

== Previous programming ==
- The ½ Hour News Hour, a half-hour television news satire show hosted by Jennifer Robertson; produced by FNC's sister division 20th Century Fox Television)
- 212 with Brian Kilmeade, a show focusing on New York City
- After Hours with Cal Thomas, a weekend talk show, focused around conversations with newsmakers and featured a weekly commentary by the host, named "Column One"
- America At War, a continuous news/talk program covering the beginning of the 2003 invasion of Iraq
- America Live, a two-hour afternoon newscast anchored by Megyn Kelly February 1, 2010 – September 27, 2013; canceled when Kelly left in 2013 for a primetime weeknight newscast called The Kelly File
- America's Election Headquarters, a weekday news/politics program, hosted by Bill Hemmer and Megyn Kelly
- America's News Headquarters, a weekday and weekend news/politics program
- America's Pulse with E. D. Hill
- The Beltway Boys, a half-hour show that explored the scene from inside the Beltway, hosted by Fred Barnes and Mort Kondracke
- Beyond the News, a talk program, hosted by Dr. Georgia Witkin
- The Big Story, hosted by John Gibson and Heather Nauert
- Bill Hemmer Reports, previously Studio B/Shepard Smith Reporting, an American television news/opinion/talk program on Fox News Channel hosted by Bill Hemmer and formerly Shepard Smith, which aired from 2002 to 2021.
- Bulls & Bears, a weekend business news and analysis show, hosted by Brenda Buttner
- Cashin’ In, a weekend business and markets program
- Cavuto Live, a two-hour weekend news program focusing on the intersection of business and politics, hosted by Neil Cavuto
- The Crier Report, a talk program that featured various personalities, hosted by Catherine Crier
- Crime Scene, an occasional true crime program made up of stories from the Fox News archives, hosted by Greta Van Susteren
- Crime Wave, a newsmagazine program focusing on crime, hosted by Jon Scott
- The Daily Briefing with Dana Perino, a midday show that focuses on news of the day
- DaySide, a weekday news/talk program featuring a studio audience
- Drudge, a talk program hosted by Matt Drudge
- The Edge with Paula Zahn, a talk program that featured celebrities and politicians
- Entertainment Coast to Coast, a talk program about entertainment, hosted by Bill McCuddy and Juliet Huddy
- Forbes on Fox, a weekend business panel show, hosted by David Asman
- Fox Magazine with Laurie Dhue, a newsmagazine that focused around in-depth reports, but also news of the previous week
- Fox News Now, the first program to air on the network, focused on all the news in only fifteen minutes
- Fox News Specialists, an afternoon panel talk show
- Fox News Watch, hosted by Eric Breindel 1997-1998 Eric Burns 1998-2008 E. D. Hill 2008 and finally Jon Scott 2008-2013
- Fox on..., FNC's rolling programming focusing on select topics, each running about 20 minutes
- Fox Online, a weekday program connecting the network with its website, FoxNews.com, and hosted by Bill Hemmer (returned as a weekend program before taken off)
- Fox Wire, a news/talk program, hosted by Rita Cosby
- Fox X-press, FNC's original morning program before Fox & Friends
- Geraldo at Large, an evening newsmagazine hosted by Geraldo Rivera
- Glenn Beck, an hour-long political opinion program, hosted by Glenn Beck
- The Greg Gutfeld Show, a Saturday night talk show hosted by Greg Gutfeld, later rebranded to "Gutfeld!" and became a weekday show.
- Hannity & Colmes, co-anchored by Sean Hannity and Alan Colmes (1996-2009)
- Hannity's America, a program featuring 2-on-2 debate, interviews with people on the street, and other elements; hosted by Sean Hannity
- Happening Now, a program covered by Jon Scott covering the latest headlines of the morning
- A Healthy You & Carol Alt, a weekend health and wellness program
- Heartland with John Kasich
- Hot Shots!, a compilation of videos from the Fox Report's "Across America" and "Around the World in 80 Seconds"
- Huckabee, talk show with musical features hosted by former Arkansas Governor and presidential candidate Mike Huckabee
- The Insiders, a talk program, hosted by E. D. Hill
- Judith Regan Tonight, a weekend talk program hosted by Judith Regan
- Just In, hosted by Laura Ingraham
- Justice with Judge Jeanine, legal and current events program hosted by former district attorney and judge Jeanine Pirro
- The Kelly File, hosted by Megyn Kelly
- The Live Desk, hosted by Martha MacCallum and Trace Gallagher
- Media Buzz, hosted by Howard Kurtz (2013–2025)
- Money News Now, a weekend two hour business news broadcast
- Movietone News, an hour-long show focusing on nostalgic news (named after former Fox Movietone newsreels)
- The Next Revolution, an opinion program, hosted by Steve Hilton
- Only on Fox, a show featuring stories which only FNC brought to its viewers that other networks didn't, hosted by Trace Gallagher
- On the Record with Greta Van Susteren, an evening news program hosted by Greta Van Susteren from 2002 until her departure from the network in September 2016. Subsequently, hosted by Brit Hume from September 2016 until the shows end in November 2016.
- The O'Reilly Factor a news talk program hosted by Bill O'Reilly once cable news's top-rated show, features commentary and interviews
- Outnumbered Overtime with Harris Faulkner, a midday news/interview program
- Pat Sajak Weekend, a weekend talk program
- Pet News, a two-hour call-in program about domestic animals
- Red Eye, a late-night talk show hosted by Tom Shillue and formerly Greg Gutfeld.
- The Real Story, an afternoon news/talk show, hosted by Gretchen Carlson
- The Schneider Report, FNC's original evening-news program, hosted by Mike Schneider
- Shepard Smith Reporting, American television news/opinion/talk program on Fox News Channel hosted by Shepard Smith which aired from 2002 to 2019.
- Showdown with Larry Elder, a one-time July 5, 2008, show or special hosted by Larry Elder; was never picked up as a regular show on the Fox News after the July 5, 2008, airing
- Special Report with Brit Hume, hosted by former Washington managing editor Brit Hume
- Sunday Best with Jane Skinner, reviewed the network's previous week's stories and commentaries
- That Regan Woman, an hour-long interview show hosted by Judith Regan
- Tucker Carlson Tonight (November 14, 2016 – April 21, 2023), an evening cultural affairs program and the most watched prime time cable news show.
- War Stories with Oliver North, a military history program
- Watters’ World, a weekend current affairs program, hosted by Jesse Watters
- Weekend Live, covered the latest news, politics, Hollywood, and many other subjects from Washington, D.C.
- Your World with Neil Cavuto, a news and business talk program hosted by Neil Cavuto

== Fox Network programming ==
Fox News Special Presentation title card for Fox News coverage on Fox until 2009.

Fox News Channel acts as the de facto news division of the Fox broadcast network, providing coverage of major breaking news and select live events, such as the State of the Union speech. The network also manages Fox NewsEdge, a distribution service of footage and reports for local Fox affiliates' news broadcasts.

In addition to news coverage, the network produces Fox News Sunday, a Sunday morning talk show featuring interviews with national leaders in politics and public life, hosted by Shannon Bream. From 2007 - 2009, the network produced The Morning Show with Mike and Juliet, a syndicated morning program featuring celebrity interviews, a live studio audience, and segments relating to viewers, hosted by past-DaySide and Fox & Friends Weekend hosts, Juliet Huddy and Mike Jerrick (Produced by FNC's sister division 20th Television and cancelled in the summer of 2009).

Since February 23, 2026, Fox News Media produces the 90-second daily news bulletin called Fox News Report anchored by Fox News correspondent Bill Melugin; the bulletin is currently airing on most Fox-owned stations and will also carried by Fox affiliate stations.

Since the original launch of FNC, the network has tried multiple times to produce newsmagazine programs for the network. Some of these programs have been canceled due to low ratings, including Fox Files, The Pulse, and Geraldo at Large (which returned to FNC in February 2007 as a weekend show). But others, like Hannity's America, continue to thrive. Bill O'Reilly has said he considers his top rated show - The O'Reilly Factor to be in the format of a newsmagazine. He points to the inclusion of regular features such as 'Pinheads & Patriots' and the weekly 'The Great American Culture Quiz', which has very little to do with politics, to bolster his point.

== FoxNews.com Live programming ==
Internet-only content that began during the 2008 election season. It was originally known as the Strategy Room until after the 2010 elections.

Program	Hosted by	Description
The Morning Click	Jamie Colby, Harris Faulkner	Current events
FBN Live	Lauren Green, Uma Pemmaraju, Gregg Jarrett, Arthel Neville, Rick Folbaum, and Heather Childers	Current events
Entertainment Hour	Kimberly Guilfoyle	Crime and legal news
Defcon 3	Kathleen Troia McFarland	Military news and information
Spirited Debate	Lauren Green	Discussion on religious topics
