= List of American television programs currently in production =

This is a list of American television programmes currently in production.

== Pre–1977 ==
=== 1947 ===
- Meet the Press

=== 1948 ===
- ABC World News Tonight
- CBS Evening News

=== 1949 ===
- Thoroughbred Racing on NBC

=== 1951 ===
- Hallmark Hall of Fame
- PGA Tour on CBS

=== 1952 ===
- American Religious Townhall
- Today

=== 1954 ===
- Face the Nation
- Golf Channel on NBC
- The Tonight Show

=== 1956 ===
- The Open Mind

=== 1958 ===
- College Football on CBS Sports

=== 1960 ===
- CBS Sports Spectacular

=== 1963 ===
- General Hospital

=== 1965 ===
- Days of Our Lives

=== 1966 ===
- The 700 Club
- ESPN College Football on ABC (1950, 1952, 1954–1956, 1960–1961, 1966–present)

=== 1967 ===
- Washington Week

=== 1968 ===
- 60 Minutes

=== 1969 ===
- Sesame Street

=== 1970 ===
- Monday Night Football
- NBC Nightly News

=== 1971 ===
- Masterpiece

=== 1972 ===
- Great Performances
- The Price Is Right

=== 1973 ===
- Praise
- The Young and the Restless

=== 1974 ===
- Nova

=== 1975 ===
- Good Morning America
- PBS NewsHour
- Saturday Night Live
- U.S. Farm Report
- Wheel of Fortune

=== 1976 ===
- Austin City Limits
- Star Gazers

== 1977–2026 ==
=== 1977 ===
- Inside the NFL

=== 1978 ===
- 20/20

=== 1979 ===
- CBS News Sunday Morning
- ESPN College Basketball
- Golf on ESPN
- SportsCenter
- This Old House

=== 1980 ===
- Nightline

=== 1981 ===
- College Basketball on CBS
- Entertainment Tonight
- MotorWeek
- Noticiero Univision
- This Week

=== 1982 ===
- AgDay
- CBS Morning News
- CBS News Roundup
- ESPN College Football
- Good Morning America First Look
- Late Night
- Nature

=== 1983 ===
- Frontline
- Live with...

=== 1984 ===
- Jeopardy! (1964–1975, 1978–1979, 1984–present)

=== 1985 ===
- National Geographic Explorer
- Sunday NFL Countdown

=== 1986 ===
- American Masters

=== 1987 ===
- The Bold and the Beautiful
- College GameDay, football version
- NFL on ESPN
- NFL Primetime
- Noticias Telemundo
- Sit and Be Fit
- Weekend Today

=== 1988 ===
- American Experience
- 48 Hours
- POV

=== 1989 ===
- America's Funniest Home Videos
- Cops
- Inside Edition
- Inside the NBA
- MTV Unplugged
- The Simpsons

=== 1990 ===
- Baseball Tonight
- ESPN Major League Baseball
- Sunday Night Baseball
- Wednesday Night Baseball
- NBA Action

=== 1991 ===
- Notre Dame Football on NBC

=== 1992 ===
- Dateline NBC
- To the Contrary
- World News Now

=== 1993 ===
- Enjoying Everyday Life
- Entertainers with Byron Allen
- Monday Night Countdown
- NFL Matchup
- WWE Raw

=== 1994 ===
- Extra
- NFL on Fox
- Fox NFL Sunday
- Primer Impacto

=== 1995 ===
- Fox College Hoops
- Golf Central
- Squawk Box
- Washington Journal

=== 1996 ===
- The Daily Show
- Fox News Sunday
- Fox Saturday Baseball
- Major League Baseball Game of the Week (1953–1993, 1996–present)
- MLB on Fox
- Power Lunch

=== 1997 ===
- Antiques Roadshow
- CBS Saturday Morning
- ¡Despierta América!
- South Park
- The View
- WNBA on ESPN

=== 1998 ===
- Book TV
- The Challenge
- El Gordo y la Flaca
- Fox & Friends
- NFL on CBS (1956–1994, 1998–present)
- NFL Live
- The NFL Today (1961–1994, 1998–present)
- Special Report

=== 1999 ===
- Divorce Court (1957–1962, 1967–1969, 1984–1993, 1999–present)
- Early Today
- Family Feud (1976–1985, 1988–1995, 1999–present)
- Fox College Football
- Fox Report
- Hardwood Classics
- House Hunters
- Independent Lens
- Law & Order: Special Victims Unit
- SpongeBob SquarePants
- WWE SmackDown

=== 2000 ===
- America's Morning Headquarters
- Big Brother
- Rick Steves' Europe
- Secrets of the Dead
- Survivor

=== 2001 ===
- The Amazing Race
- America's Test Kitchen
- College Football Scoreboard
- Hard Knocks
- NASCAR on Fox
- NASCAR RaceDay
- Pardon the Interruption

=== 2002 ===
- Al Rojo Vivo
- The Bachelor
- Closing Bell
- CNN Business Traveller
- Contacto Deportivo
- Cyberchase
- NBA Countdown
- NBA on ABC (1965–1973, 2002–present)
- NBA on ESPN (1982–1984, 2002–present)

=== 2003 ===
- Anderson Cooper 360°
- Missing
- NCIS
- Real Time with Bill Maher

=== 2004 ===
- The First 48
- Impact!
- Journal Editorial Report
- Project Runway
- Q&A
- Snapped

=== 2005 ===
- After Words
- America's Heartland
- American Dad!
- College GameDay, basketball version
- Dancing with the Stars
- Deadliest Catch
- Family Guy (1999–2003, 2005–present)
- Grey's Anatomy
- Hell's Kitchen
- It's Always Sunny in Philadelphia
- Mad Money
- Made in Hollywood
- Puppy Bowl
- Robot Chicken
- The Situation Room with Wolf Blitzer
- Squawk on the Street
- The Ultimate Fighter

=== 2006 ===
- America's Game: The Super Bowl Champions
- America's Got Talent
- CNN Newsroom
- College Football on NBC Sports
- Diners, Drive-Ins and Dives
- Fast Money
- Football Night in America
- NBC Sunday Night Football
- NFL on NBC (1955–1998, 2006–present)
- The Real Housewives of Orange County
- Saturday Night Football
- Thursday Night Football
- Top Chef

=== 2007 ===
- America's Newsroom
- BBC World News America
- E:60
- First Take
- Major League Baseball on TBS
- Morning Joe
- TMZ on TV
- Today with Jenna & Sheinelle

=== 2008 ===
- 1st Look
- The Bachelorette (2003–2005, 2008–present)
- Fareed Zakaria GPS
- Ghost Adventures
- The Rachel Maddow Show
- The Real Housewives of Atlanta
- The Real Housewives of New York City

=== 2009 ===
- 30 for 30
- American Ninja Warrior
- Chopped
- CNN Newsroom
- The Daytripper
- Hannity
- Hot Stove
- Let's Make a Deal (1963–1977, 1980–1981, 1984–1986, 1990–1991, 2003, 2009–present)
- MLB Network Showcase
- MLB Tonight
- On the Case with Paula Zahn
- Pawn Stars
- Quick Pitch
- The Real Housewives of New Jersey
- RuPaul's Drag Race
- Shark Tank
- State of the Union with Jake Tapper
- Thursday Night Baseball (1979–1983, 1989, 1997–2001, 2003–2006, 2009–present)
- Watch What Happens Live with Andy Cohen

=== 2010 ===
- America's Court with Judge Ross
- American Pickers
- Ancient Aliens
- Gold Rush
- The Great Food Truck Race
- The Last Word with Lawrence O'Donnell
- MasterChef
- The Real Housewives of Beverly Hills
- RuPaul's Drag Race: Untucked
- Sister Wives
- Storage Wars
- Swamp People
- Varney & Co.
- Worst Cooks in America
- WWE NXT

=== 2011 ===
- American Horror Story
- Bar Rescue
- Bob's Burgers
- Erin Burnett OutFront
- The Five
- Halloween Wars
- Impractical Jokers
- Intentional Talk
- Moonshiners
- NCAA March Madness
- NFL Top 100
- NHL Tonight
- Off the Air
- Penn & Teller: Fool Us
- The Pioneer Woman
- PoliticsNation with Al Sharpton
- Shaqtin' a Fool
- The Voice
- Wild Kratts

=== 2012 ===
- Baseball Night in America
- Bering Sea Gold
- Chicago Fire
- CNN This Morning with Audie Cornish
- Daniel Tiger's Neighborhood
- Finding Your Roots
- Fox & Friends First
- Graveyard Carz
- Justice for All with Judge Cristina Perez
- Mountain Men
- RuPaul's Drag Race All Stars
- Small Town Big Deal
- WWE Main Event

=== 2013 ===
- All In with Chris Hayes
- Beat Bobby Flay
- Below Deck
- Celebrity Page
- CNN This Morning Weekend
- Fatal Attraction
- Fox NFL Kickoff
- The Great Christmas Light Fight
- Guy's Grocery Games
- The Lead with Jake Tapper
- Married to Medicine
- Naked and Afraid
- Nick Cannon Presents: Wild 'N Out (2005–2007, 2013–present)
- Paw Patrol
- Premier League on NBC
- Rick and Morty
- Snapped: Killer Couples
- Teen Titans Go!
- Vanderpump Rules

=== 2014 ===
- 90 Day Fiancé
- Bachelor in Paradise
- Chicago P.D.
- The Curse of Oak Island
- ESPN Megacast (2006–2007, 2014–present)
- Holiday Baking Championship
- Hot Bench
- Inside Politics (1984–2005, 2014–present)
- Last Week Tonight with John Oliver
- Married at First Sight
- Masters of Illusion (2000–2001, 2009, 2014–present)
- Odd Squad
- Outnumbered
- SEC Nation
- Soccer on Fox Sports
- Southern Charm
- Thoroughbred Racing on Fox Sports (1998–2000, 2014–present)
- True Detective
- When Calls the Heart

=== 2015 ===
- 7 Little Johnstons
- Alone
- Celebrity Family Feud (2008, 2015–present)
- Chicago Med
- Expedition Unknown
- Forged in Fire
- Full Measure with Sharyl Attkisson
- The Great American Baking Show
- Gutfeld!
- Halloween Baking Championship
- Kids Baking Championship
- MLS on Fox (2003–2011, 2015–present)
- My Big Fat Fabulous Life
- My Lottery Dream Home
- NASCAR on NBC (1979–1981, 1983–1985, 1999–2006, 2015–present)
- Premier Boxing Champions
- Soccer on Fox Sports
- Spring Baking Championship

=== 2016 ===
- The 11th Hour
- Below Deck Mediterranean
- The Boulet Brothers' Dragula
- CBS Weekend News
- Evil Lives Here
- Good Morning Football
- Home Town
- The Loud House
- NFL on ABC (1948-1950, 1970-2006, 2016-present)
- Pyramid (1973–1988, 1991, 2002–2004, 2012, 2016–present)
- The Real Housewives of Potomac
- The Wall

=== 2017 ===
- Beat Shazam
- The Beat with Ari Melber
- Cold Justice (2013–2015, 2017–present)
- Deadline: White House
- First Things First
- Fox News @ Night
- Funny You Should Ask
- The Ingraham Angle
- Maine Cabin Masters
- Mama June: From Not to Hot
- NFL on Prime Video
- The Story with Martha MacCallum
- Summer House
- The Toys That Made Us

=== 2018 ===
- 25 Words or Less
- 9-1-1
- America Says
- American Idol (2002–2016, 2018–present)
- Big City Greens
- Exatlón Estados Unidos
- The Family Business
- FBI
- Firing Line with Margaret Hoover (1966–1999, 2018–present)
- Get Up!
- Girl Meets Farm
- GMA3: What You Need To Know
- The Last Drive-in with Joe Bob Briggs
- Life, Liberty & Levin
- Love After Lockup
- My Next Guest Needs No Introduction with David Letterman
- The Rookie

=== 2019 ===
- All Elite Wrestling: Dynamite
- BBQ Brawl
- Big Noon Kickoff
- Couples Therapy
- Court Cam
- The Food That Built America
- Formula 1: Drive to Survive
- Love Island
- The Masked Singer
- Molly of Denali
- Press Your Luck (1983–1986, 2019–present)
- Primal
- Selling Sunset
- Sistas
- Tamron Hall
- The UnXplained
- Virgin River
- WNBA on CBS

=== 2020 ===
- 1000-lb Sisters
- Below Deck Sailing Yacht
- Bridgerton
- The Drew Barrymore Show
- Elinor Wonders Why
- The Greatest @Home Videos
- Lego Masters
- Love Is Blind
- Major League Baseball on ABC (1953–1954, 1959–1961, 1965, 1976–1989, 1994–1995, 2020–present)
- NewsNation Prime
- The Real Housewives of Salt Lake City
- Ruthless
- The Secret of Skinwalker Ranch
- Ted Lasso
- Tournament of Champions
- Tyler Perry's Assisted Living
- Tyler Perry's House of Payne (2006–2012, 2020–present)
- Unsolved Mysteries (1987–1999, 2001–2002, 2008–2010, 2020–present)
- Way Too Early (2009–2016, 2020–present)
- Weakest Link (2001–2003, 2020–present)

=== 2021 ===
- 100 Foot Wave
- Abbott Elementary
- Alma's Way
- America Reports
- America's Black Forum (1977–2006, 2021–present)
- America's Most Wanted (1988–2012, 2021–present)
- Baddies
- Belle Collective
- Biography: WWE Legends
- CBS Mornings
- Crime Scene Kitchen
- Donkey Hodie
- Foundation
- Fox News Live (1999–2008, 2021–present)
- Ghosts
- Ginny & Georgia
- Hoy Día
- Invasion
- Invincible
- La casa de los famosos
- Launchpad
- Manningcast
- The Ms. Pat Show
- Name That Tune (1953–1959, 1970–1971, 1974–1981, 1984–1985, 2021–present)
- The National Desk
- NBA Today
- NFL Slimetime
- NHL on ABC (1993–1994, 2000–2004, 2021–present)
- NHL on ESPN (1979–1982, 1985–1988, 1992–2004, 2021–present)
- NHL on TNT
- Only Murders in the Building
- The Patrick Star Show
- The Point
- The Real Housewives Ultimate Girls Trip
- Spidey and His Amazing Friends
- Sunday Night in America with Trey Gowdy
- That's My Jam
- Toon In with Me
- The White Lotus

=== 2022 ===
- Batwheels
- Bobby's Triple Threat
- Celebrity Jeopardy!
- Chibiverse
- Coach Prime
- College Basketball on USA (1982–1988, 2022–present)
- The Creature Cases
- Dark Winds
- Don't Forget the Lyrics! (2007–2011, 2022–present)
- Duck Family Treasure
- Fire Country
- Friday Night Baseball
- The Gilded Age
- Golf on USA (1982–2007, 2009–2010, 2022–present)
- Ink Master (2012–2020, 2022–present)
- Interview with the Vampire
- Is It Cake?
- The Jennifer Hudson Show
- Jesse Watters Primetime
- The Kardashians
- Law & Order (1990–2010, 2022–present)
- Loot
- The Lord of the Rings: The Rings of Power
- Love on the Spectrum
- MLB Sunday Leadoff
- NASCAR on USA (1982–1985, 2016, 2022–present)
- NBC News Daily
- Next Level Chef
- On Patrol: Live
- One Nation with Brian Kilmeade
- Password (1961–1967, 1971–1975, 2022–present)
- Reacher
- Reasonable Doubt
- Rosie's Rules
- Severance
- Southern Hospitality
- The Terminal List
- Top Chef VIP
- Tulsa King
- The Ultimatum: Marry or Move On
- The Watcher
- We Baby Bears
- Wednesday
- Welcome to Wrexham
- WWE Rivals
- Zatima

=== 2023 ===
- ACC on The CW
- Adventure Time: Fionna and Cake
- AEW Collision
- Ahsoka
- Animal Control
- The Ark
- Beef
- The Big Weekend Show
- The Briefing with Jen Psaki
- Citadel
- CNN News Central
- CNN NewsNight (2001–2005, 2023–present)
- Cocomelon Lane
- The Diplomat
- Farmer Wants a Wife (2008, 2023–present)
- FBI True
- Fox News Saturday Night
- Full Swing
- Futurama (1999–2003, 2008–2013, 2023–present)
- The Golden Bachelor
- House of Villains
- Jeopardy! Masters
- Jury Duty
- Kiff
- Kitchen Nightmares (2007–2014, 2023–present)
- Krapopolis
- The Last of Us
- The Last Thing He Told Me
- Laura Coates Live
- Love Island Games
- Mayfair Witches
- Monarch: Legacy of Monsters
- Ms. Pat Settles It
- My Adventures with Superman
- My Life with the Walter Boys
- One Piece
- Outlast
- Percy Jackson and the Olympians
- Perfect Match
- Platonic
- Pupstruction
- The Reluctant Traveler
- Rubble & Crew
- School Spirits
- Shrinking
- The Source with Kaitlan Collins
- Special Forces: World's Toughest Test
- Special Ops: Lioness
- SuperKitties
- The Traitors
- Tribunal Justice
- Twisted Metal
- The Walking Dead: Dead City
- Wild Kingdom (1963–1988, 2002–2011, 2023–present)
- Will Trent
- Work It Out Wombats!
- XO, Kitty

=== 2024 ===
- The 1% Club
- 3 Body Problem
- 24 in 24: Last Chef Standing
- The Agency
- Ariel
- Ark: The Animated Series
- Bad Monkey
- Batman: Caped Crusader
- Beast Games
- Carl the Collector
- Conan O'Brien Must Go
- Creature Commandos
- The Creep Tapes
- Cross
- Dark Matter
- Dinner and a Movie (1995–2011, 2024–present)
- Dora
- Dune: Prophecy
- Elsbeth
- Fallout
- The Floor
- The Gentlemen
- Georgie & Mandy’s First Marriage
- Grimsburg
- Happy's Place
- Have I Got News for You
- Hazbin Hotel
- High Potential
- It's Florida, Man
- Landman
- Lyla in the Loop
- Matlock
- Mr. & Mrs. Smith
- NASCAR: Full Speed
- NASCAR on The CW
- NCIS: Origins
- The New Look
- Nobody Wants This
- Owning Manhattan
- Police 24/7
- Presumed Innocent
- The Quiz with Balls
- Sanctuary: A Witch's Tale
- Scrabble (1984–1990, 1993, 2024–present)
- Secret Level
- The Secret Lives of Mormon Wives
- Shōgun
- St. Denis Medical
- Sugar
- Tires
- TMZ Investigates
- Totally Funny Animals
- Tracker
- Trivial Pursuit (1993–1994, 2024–present)
- Universal Basic Guys
- The Valley
- The Weekend
- What Would You Do? (2008–2020, 2024–present)
- Who Wants to Be a Millionaire (1999–2021, 2024–present)
- X-Men '97

=== 2025 ===
- 9-1-1: Nashville
- 99 to Beat
- Adults
- Alien: Earth
- All’s Fair
- The Artist
- Bad Thoughts
- Ballard
- Bat-Fam
- Baylen Out Loud
- Beavis and Butt-Head (1993–1997, 2011, 2022–2023, 2025–present)
- Beyond the Gates
- Boston Blue
- Chad Powers
- The Chair Company
- Comics Unleashed (2006–2014, 2023–2024, 2025–present)
- Common Side Effects
- Destination X
- Dexter: Resurrection
- Doc
- Duck Dynasty: The Revival
- Everybody's Live with John Mulaney
- Extracted
- Forever
- The Four Seasons
- Good American Family
- Guts & Glory
- Haha, You Clowns
- Haunted Hotel
- Hollywood Squares (1966–1981, 1986–1989, 1998–2004, 2025–present)
- The Hunting Wives
- I Love LA
- The Institute
- Iron Man and His Awesome Friends
- It: Welcome to Derry
- Iyanu
- King of the Hill (1997–2010, 2025–present)
- Leanne
- The Librarians: The Next Chapter
- Long Story Short
- Love Hotel
- Love Island: Beyond the Villa
- Love Thy Nader
- The Lowdown
- Marvel Zombies
- Match Game (1962–1969, 1973–1982, 1990–1991, 1998–1999, 2016–2021, 2025–present)
- Mickey Mouse Clubhouse+
- The Mighty Nein
- Million Dollar Secret
- MobLand
- Murderbot
- My View with Lara Trump
- NASCAR on TNT (2001–2014, 2025–present)
- NBA on NBC (1954–1962, 1990–2002, 2025–present)
- Next Gen NYC
- Number 1 Happy Family USA
- Outlander: Blood of My Blood
- Overcompensating
- The Paper
- Phineas and Ferb (2007–2015, 2025–present)
- The Pitt
- Pluribus
- The Rainmaker
- Reading Rainbow (1983–2006, 2025–present)
- Robin Hood
- RoboGobo
- Running Point
- Saturday in America with Kayleigh McEnany
- Sheriff Country
- Sherlock & Daughter
- Shifting Gears
- The Sisters Grimm
- Splinter Cell: Deathwatch
- Stick
- The Story Is with Elex Michaelson
- The Studio
- The Sunday Briefing
- Sunday Night Soccer
- Survival Mode
- Task
- Tennis on TNT (2000–2002, 2025–present)
- Temptation Island (2001–2003, 2019–2023, 2025–present)
- The Thundermans: Undercover
- Tucci in Italy
- TV We Love
- Untamed
- Vampirina: Teenage Vampire
- We Were Liars
- Weather Hunters
- The Weeknight
- Wife Swap: The Real Housewives Edition
- The Wonderfully Weird World of Gumball
- WWE Evolve
- WWE LFG
- WWE Unreal
- Wylde Pak
- Your Friendly Neighborhood Spider-Man
- Your Friends and Neighbors

=== 2026 ===
- 12 12 12
- 56 Days
- Adam's Law
- Adventure Time: Side Quests
- Age of Attraction
- Alaska State Troopers (2009–2015, 2026–present)
- American Classic
- American Gladators
- American Hostage
- Among Us
- Anna Pigeon
- The Audacity
- Avatar: Seven Havens
- Bass X Machina
- Belle Collective: Birmingham
- Best Medicine
- Big Day with Peter Schrager
- Big Mistakes
- Breaking Bear
- Brothers
- The 'Burbs
- Carrie
- CIA
- The Circle (2020-2024, 2026-present)
- College Football on USA (1980–1986, 2020, 2026–present)
- Coven Academy
- Crystal Lake
- Cupertino
- Dancing with the Stars: The Next Pro
- A Different World
- The Doomies
- Doozie's Doghouse
- Dragon Striker
- The Drop: A Snowfall Saga
- Dutton Ranch
- Elle
- Eternally Yours
- Every Year After
- The Fall and Rise of Reggie Dinkins
- Fear Factor: House of Fear
- Fightland
- The Five-Star Weekend
- Free Bert
- Furious
- Get Jiro
- Golden Axe
- The Great American Road Rally
- The Greatest Average American
- Harlan Coben's Final Twist
- The Hawk
- Hey A.J.!
- Hollywood Arts
- In the City
- A Knight of the Seven Kingdoms
- Lanterns
- Line of Fire
- Little House on the Prairie
- Love Story
- The Madison
- Magicampers
- Major League Baseball on NBC (1947–1989, 1994–2000, 2022–2023, 2026–present)
- Man on Fire
- Margo's Got Money Troubles
- Marshals
- Mating Season
- Maul: Shadow Lord
- Maximum Pleasure Guaranteed
- Memory of a Killer
- Million Dollar Nannies
- The Miniature Wife
- Minimum Wage
- MonsterQuest (2007–2010, 2026–present)
- My Strange Addiction (2010–2015, 2026–present)
- Nation's Dumbest
- NCIS: New York
- Neagley
- Neighbors
- Nemesis
- Newlyweds
- NFL Total Access (2003-2024, 2026-present)
- Off Campus
- Phoebe & Jay
- Phony
- President Curtis
- R.J. Decker
- The Real Housewives of Rhode Island
- Regular Show: The Lost Tapes
- Rooster
- Running Wild with Bear Grylls (2014–2023, 2026–present)
- Scarpetta
- Scrubs
- The Shards
- Sofia the First: Royal Magic
- Star City
- Star Search (1983–1995, 2003–2004, 2026–present)
- Star Wars: Visions Presents
- Sterling Point
- Stranger Things: Tales from '85
- Stuart Fails to Save the Universe
- The Terror (2018–2019, 2026–present)
- The Terrors of Jordan Mendoza
- The Testaments
- The Traitors: New Blood
- Untold Stories of the E.R. (2004–2020, 2026–present)
- The Valley: Persian Style
- War
- The Westies
- Widow's Bay
- WNBA on NBC (1997–2002, 2026–present)
- WNBA on USA

== See also ==
- List of years in American television
