= One Nation with Brian Kilmeade =

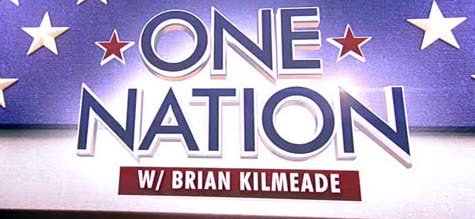
- Genre: Political program
- Presented by: Brian Kilmeade
- Country of origin: United States
- Original language: English
- No. of seasons: 3

Production
- Production location: New York City
- Camera setup: Multi-camera
- Running time: 60 minutes
- Production company: Fox News Channel

Original release
- Network: Fox News Channel
- Release: January 29, 2022 – present

One Nation with Brian Kilmeade is an American television program on that airs on Fox News Channel and is hosted by Brian Kilmeade. The program airs every Sunday at 10 p.m. ET live from Fox News' world headquarters in New York City. The show has been a part of Fox News' lineup since January 29, 2022.

On September 14, 2023, it was announced that One Nation would be moving to the 9 p.m. ET slot after the ending of Lawrence Jones Cross Country. On February 5, 2025, it was announced that the Saturday 9 p.m. ET time slot would air a new show My View with Lara Trump starting on February 22, with One Nation moving to Sunday nights at 10 p.m.

== Host ==
- Brian Kilmeade (2022–present): Kilmeade, who has been with Fox News since 1997, currently serves as co-host of Fox & Friends and host of The Brian Kilmeade Show on Fox News Radio in addition to hosting One Nation. He is also a New York Times Best Selling author.

== Format ==
The show begins with Kilmeade introducing himself and presenting a short monologue about the week's news. He then brings in multiple guests throughout the hour.

Some frequent segments on the show include "News Duel", where Kilmeade brings on a fellow Fox News personality, and they each present multiple news stories that occurred throughout the week in a certain amount of time. Another segment is called "The Co-host Quiz", where Kilmeade brings on co-hosts of different Fox News shows to see how well they know each other.

== Frequent guests ==
Kilmeade has interviewed a variety of guests; below are Fox News/Fox Business personalities that he frequently speaks with.

- Will Cain: host of The Will Cain Show
- Julie Banderas: Fox News anchor
- Jeanine Pirro: co-host of The Five
- Tyrus: Fox News Contributor, co-host/regular panelist on Gutfeld!
- Dana Perino: co-anchor of America's Newsroom and co-host of The Five
- Tomi Lahren: Fox News Contributor, Outkick host
- Harold Ford Jr.: Former Tennessee Congressman, co-host of The Five
- Kayleigh McEnany: co-host of Outnumbered, former White House Press Sec.
- Bill Hemmer: co-anchor of America's Newsroom
- Shannon Bream: host of Fox News Sunday
- Jimmy Failla: host of Fox Across America and Fox News Saturday Night

| Preceded by Sunday Night in America with Trey Gowdy | One Nation w/Brian Kilmeade; 10:00 PM ET – 11:00 PM ET | Succeeded by Life, Liberty & Levin (replay) |
