= Sunday Night in America with Trey Gowdy =

- Genre: Political program
- Presented by: Trey Gowdy
- Country of origin: United States
- Original language: English
- No. of seasons: 3

Production
- Production location: South Carolina
- Camera setup: Multi-camera
- Running time: 60 minutes
- Production company: Fox News Channel

Original release
- Network: Fox News Channel
- Release: June 6, 2021 – present

Sunday Night in America with Trey Gowdy is an American television program that airs on Fox News Channel and is hosted by former South Carolina Republican Congressman Trey Gowdy. The program airs every Sunday evening live from Gowdy's home in South Carolina. The show has been a part of Fox News' lineup since June 6, 2021.

== Host ==
- Trey Gowdy, (2021–present), who joined Fox News as a contributor in 2019, is a former Republican Congressman from South Carolina. During his time in Congress he served on the Judiciary Committee as the Chairman of the Subcommittee on Crime, Terrorism, Homeland Security, and Investigations. He was involved in the Benghazi and Russia investigations. In early 2021 he served as a rotating host of Fox News Primetime. Then in 2023 he served as an interim host of Fox News Tonight following the firing of Tucker Carlson. Gowdy has also contributed to Fox News' 2022 midterm election coverage as well as their coverage of the first 2024 Republican primary election debate.

== Format ==
The show begins with Gowdy introducing himself and presenting a short monologue about the week's news. He then brings in multiple guests throughout the hour.

As of August 2023, Sunday Night in America is the 14th most popular show on Fox News, with an average of around 1.179 million viewers, often beating its competition on CNN and MSNBC.

== Frequent guests ==
Gowdy has interviewed a variety of guests; below are Fox News personalities and lawmakers that he frequently speaks with.

- Tim Scott: South Carolina Senator, 2024 Presidential Candidate
- Dana Perino: co-anchor of America's Newsroom and co-host of The Five
- Martha MacCallum: anchor of The Story with Martha MacCallum
- Harold Ford Jr.: Former Tennessee Congressman, co-host of The Five
- James Comer: Kentucky Congressman
- Jessica Tarlov, co-host of The Five
- Bill Hemmer: co-anchor of America's Newsroom
- Shannon Bream: host of Fox News Sunday
- Katie Pavlich: Fox News Contributor, TownHall.com editor
- Nancy Mace: South Carolina Congresswoman
- Kevin McCarthy: Former Speaker of the United States House of Representatives, California Congressman
- Guy Benson: host of The Guy Benson Show on Fox News Radio

== Programming announcements and changes ==
In May 2021, Fox News announced that they would be debuting a new weekend lineup featuring Gowdy debuting Sunday Night in America at 7 p.m. ET on Sundays nights beginning on June 6 and Dan Bongino debuting Unfiltered w/Dan Bongino on Saturday nights as well as The Big Weekend Show (formerly The Big Saturday/Sunday show) becoming a permanent show in Fox's weekend lineup effective June 5.

On June 1, 2023, Fox News announced that they would be debuting a new Weekend Primetime lineup following the network parting ways with weekend host Dan Bongino and the cancellation of his show. The changes saw Gowdy's program move to the 9 p.m. ET time slot replacing the also canceled The Next Revolution with Steve Hilton.

Preceded by Life, Liberty & Levin	Sunday Night in America w/ Trey Gowdy; 9:00 PM ET – 10:00 PM ET	Succeeded by FOX News Evening Programming
