= TV (The Book) =

Book by Alan Sepinwall

TV (The Book): Two Experts Pick the Greatest American Shows of All Time
- Paperback edition
- Author: Alan Sepinwall; Matt Zoller Seitz
- Subject: Art, media, pop culture, television, television criticism
- Genre: Essay
- Publisher: Grand Central Publishing
- Publication date: September 6, 2016
- Publication place: United States
- Media type: Paperback
- Pages: 432 pp
- ISBN: 978-1-4555-8819-0 (Paperback)

TV (The Book): Two Experts Pick the Greatest American Shows of All Time is a collection of essays written by television critics Alan Sepinwall and Matt Zoller Seitz. It was published in 2016. The main purpose of the book was to provide a canonical list of the top 100 greatest television programs in American history.

== Background ==
Seitz and Sepinwall began as colleagues at The Star-Ledger, where they spent ten years together working on a column in the newspaper titled "All TV." Since then, both had gone their separate ways. At the time of the book's publishing, Sepinwall was a television critic for HitFix, while Seitz was a television critic for New York and the editor-in-chief for RogerEbert.com. Sepinwall has since gone on to become the chief television critic for Rolling Stone.

== Criteria ==
According to the book, Seitz and Sepinwall considered a television series for their ranking if it matched the following criteria:

- US TV shows only: A TV show was only considered if it was either made in the United States, or if it was originally produced for an American television network. The two authors admitted that this was a "blurry" category to decide, and that some of the calls they made "are sure to be considered debatable."
- Completion: Seitz and Sepinwall wanted to only include shows which had been completed prior to the creation of their list. However, a few exceptions were made to include current shows that had aired for decades (such as The Simpsons and South Park), current shows that were never officially cancelled yet may never return from hiatus (such as Curb Your Enthusiasm and Louie), and shows that were once cancelled but eventually revived for additional seasons (these include Twin Peaks and The X-Files).
- Narrative fiction only: Reality programs, documentaries, sketch comedy, talk shows, news programs, and sports programs were not given consideration. Instead, the book's rankings mostly consisted of dramas, comedies, children's programming and certain anthology series.

Once a television series passed these criteria, they were ranked on a ten-point scale by either one of or both of the critics in six categories: "Innovation" (whether or not it did stuff that had been seen in the medium before), "Influence" (how a show served as inspiration for those that came after it), "Consistency" (whether or not the show's quality fluctuated season-by-season), "Performance" (how good the actors/performers were on the show), "Storytelling" (the quality of the writing on the show), and "Peak" (how great the show was at its best compared to the rest of American television's history). Shows which aired for only one season were slightly penalized, receiving a maximum of nine points for most categories except for "Consistency", where they were only given a seven as a maximum. The series which were among the 100 highest placed in the points tally were counted in the rankings.

== Works in Progress ==
In addition to providing their Top 100 ranking, Seitz and Sepinwall provided a section titled "Works in Progress," highlighting some of their favorite current shows, as well as a section honoring shows that were not good enough to make it into the rankings titled "A Certain Regard." There were also several essays noting of TV's best miniseries, movies, and televised plays.

== Reception ==
The book has received positive reviews from other television critics. Jacqueline Cutler of The Star-Ledger described the book as "a great reference tool," with the main top-100 list possessing "enough reflection, knowledge and tidbits that even if you don't care about a show, you will wind up reading." For Cutler, the one negative aspect of the book was the inclusion of the "Outlier Classics" and "Works-in-Progress" sections, which felt like "kiddie sports teams where everyone gets a trophy." Bill Carter, writing for CNN, was also fond of the book, appreciating its effort to stimulate argument and pointing out that even if you were to disagree "it only means you care more about television now more than ever before, which is really the reason to write and read a book like this."
