= Tony Fratto =

American government official (born 1966)

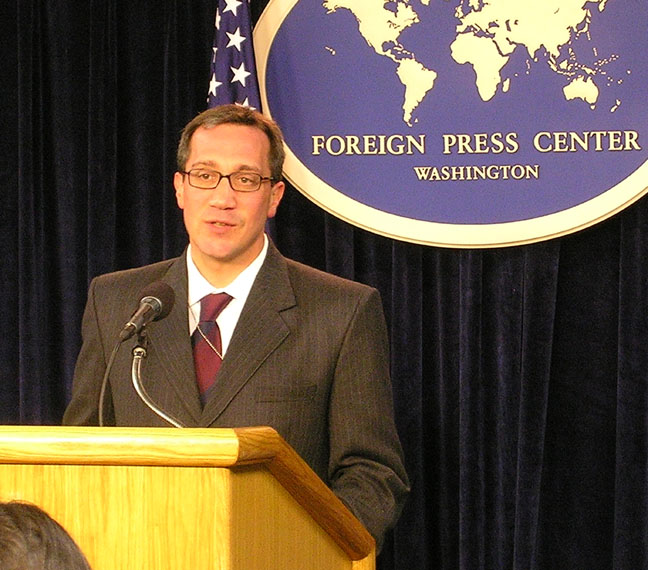

White House Deputy Press Secretary
- In office September 14, 2007 – January 20, 2009
- President: George W. Bush
- Secretary: Dana Perino
- Preceded by: Dana Perino
- Succeeded by: Jen Psaki

Personal details
- Born: June 27, 1966 (age 60) Pittsburgh, Pennsylvania, U.S.
- Party: Republican
- Education: University of Pittsburgh (BA)

Salvatore Antonio "Tony" Fratto (born June 27, 1966) was deputy assistant and deputy press secretary to former United States President George W. Bush.

== Career ==
Tony Fratto is a partner and the global head of corporate communications at Goldman Sachs He sits on the board of trustees of his alma mater, the University of Pittsburgh.

Tony Fratto was a managing partner at Hamilton Place Strategies, a strategic communications and crisis management consultancy based in Washington, DC. He is also an on-air contributor on the CNBC network, addressing current economic policy issues.

Fratto served as deputy assistant to the president and deputy press secretary to President George W. Bush from September 2006 to January 2009. He was Principal Deputy Press Secretary under Dana Perino's tenure as Press Secretary from 2007 to 2009. In this role Fratto served as the White House's lead spokesman and communications advisor on a broad range policy issues in support of Bush, working directly with the President and senior White House officials, and speaking for the White House to the national press corps from the White House podium and in on-camera interviews.

Fratto represented the Bush Administration on international and domestic economic policy – including international trade; financial markets; tax policy; banking; and international development. He also served as the White House's lead spokesman on legal issues, Supreme Court cases, U.S. intelligence issues, terrorist financing and financial crimes.

Before moving to the White House worked at the U.S. Treasury Department where he initially served as the department's spokesman on domestic and international finance, and international development policy, and later as the assistant secretary for public affairs, responsible for all Treasury issues. Fratto was instrumental in developing the Bush Administration's messaging in dealing with global financial crises, currency policy, counter-terrorist finance, and tax policy. He assisted three Treasury secretaries on activities ranging from preparation for G7 finance ministers meetings to congressional testimony, interviews and speeches. Combining his work at the Treasury and the White House, Fratto directed and participated in communications efforts in visits to more than 60 countries around the world.

Before joining the Bush Administration, Fratto served as a communications specialist for the Bush-Cheney campaign. Prior to that he served as vice president of government affairs for the Pittsburgh Regional Alliance, conducting public affairs and issue campaigns on infrastructure investments in Pennsylvania and tax reform.

Earlier in his career, he served in senior legislative and communications positions in the United States Senate, and as a political director to Pennsylvania Governor Tom Ridge. and as assistant secretary for public affairs at the Department of Treasury.

== Early life ==
Born and raised in Pittsburgh, Fratto received his bachelor's degree in economics from the University of Pittsburgh, and attended the university's Graduate School of Public and International Affairs.
