= Molly Line =

American news correspondent

- Born: January 31, 1977 (age 49); West Virginia, U.S.
- Education: Virginia Polytechnic Institute and State University (BA)
- Occupation: Reporter
- Years active: 1999-present
- Employer: Fox News Channel
- Spouse: Matt Petrus (m. 2012)
- Website: bio at Fox News.com

Molly Line is an American news correspondent who works for Fox News Channel. She joined Fox News as a Boston-based correspondent in January 2006.

== Biography ==
A 1995 graduate of Tucker County High School, Hambleton, West Virginia, Line attended college at Virginia Tech where she received a Bachelor of Arts in Mass Communication and Political Science (1999). In 1995, she competed in the Miss West Virginia Pageant for the first time as Miss Tucker County. In 1997, she competed again in the Miss West Virginia Pageant, as Miss Greater Bluefield Area, where she was among the Top 10 Semi-Finalists. She also competed in 1999 as Miss Canaan Valley. For the fourth and final try, she competed for the title in 2000, as Miss Rhododendron, where she received the Preliminary Talent Award and was named 3rd Runner Up to Miss West Virginia. According to her Facebook page, she became engaged on Thursday, June 9, 2011. She was married on July 21, 2012 at Jackson Community Church, Jackson, New Hampshire.

Molly Line was also a ski instructor as she mentioned on air during episode E132 of "Outnumbered", on July 4, 2023 approximately 12:40 pm Eastern Time.

== Professional career ==
Prior to joining FNC she worked as an anchor/reporter for WFXT (Channel 25), a Boston affiliate (Dec 2002-Dec 2005). While at WFXT, Line covered the sentencing of shoe bomber Richard Reid and the Station nightclub fire — a disaster that killed 100 people.

Line serves as a primary guest anchor/host on Fox News Live, The Big Weekend Show, Fox Report, The Faulkner Focus, Outnumbered and America Reports.

Before her work at WFXT, Line served as an anchor/reporter at WXXA (Channel 23) in Albany, NY (2000-2002). She got her start in journalism as a photographer/reporter at WDTV in Bridgeport, WV (1999-2000).

Most recently, Line reported live from the tragic shooting at Sandy Hook Elementary School in Newtown, Connecticut. She has also covered the Cartoon Network "Aqua Teen Hunger Force" scandal and the arrest and extradition of Neil Entwistle, the British born man accused of murdering his wife and baby in January 2006.
