= Fox News Saturday Night =

News and political satire program

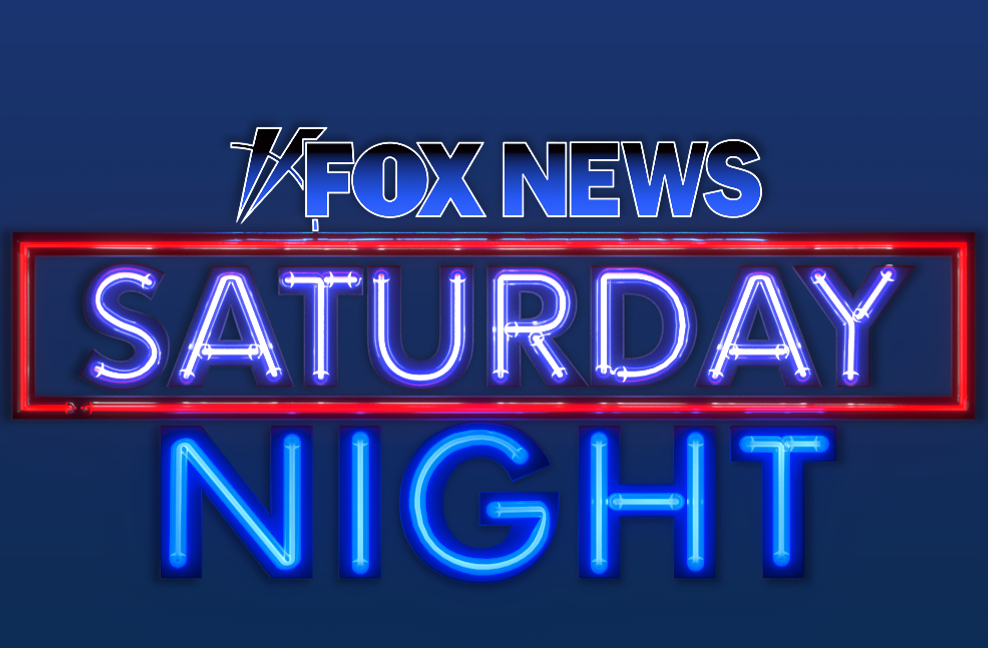
- Genre: News comedy; Political satire; Talk show
- Presented by: Jimmy Failla
- No. of seasons: 4

Production
- Production location: New York City
- Running time: 60 minutes
- Production company: Fox News

Original release
- Network: Fox News Channel
- Release: June 3, 2023 – present

Fox News Saturday Night with Jimmy Failla is an American prime time news and political satire talk show, presented by comedian and Fox News Radio host Jimmy Failla. The program airs Saturday nights on Fox News at 10 p.m. ET. It features a panel of three or four guests who discuss current stories, political issues, pop culture and offers "a lighter take" of the week's news.

The show debuted on June 3, 2023, with frequent hosts Kennedy, Tyrus, Kat Timpf and Tom Shillue serving as interim hosts before Failla became the permanent host. Originally without a live studio audience, one was added after Failla became host.

== History and production ==
Fox News Saturday Night was announced in May 2023, as part of a realignment of Fox News Channel's weekend lineup following Dan Bongino's departure from the network. It would initially be hosted by a rotation of Fox News personalities, and was billed as offering "a lighter take on the news of the week". In January 2024, Fox News named Jimmy Failla—who hosts Fox Across America on the Fox News Radio network—as the permanent host of Fox News Saturday Night beginning January 13.

A former New York taxi driver, Failla had previously been discovered performing at the Gotham Comedy Club, and served as a writer for Kennedy's program on Fox Business. Fox News executive Megan Albano explained that the show was influenced by its other recent forays into comedy-oriented programming, including Gutfeld! and the stand-up comedy specials it had produced for its streaming service Fox Nation. Failla described Fox News Saturday Night as not being a "call to arms show", but "like a chill the fuck out show". He cited a preference towards the less "partisan" styles of former late-night hosts such as David Letterman and Jay Leno, albeit acknowledging that Jimmy Fallon sent him a congratulatory letter with a cooler of Ben & Jerry's Tonight Dough ice cream to celebrate his hiring.

Since becoming the host of FNSN, Failla has appeared in other entertainment-oriented Fox News programming, including hosting its coverage of the White House Correspondents' Dinner, and its 2024–25 New Year's Eve special All-American New Year Bash. Failla also tours the country with his stand-up comedy show.

== Format and guests ==
After a stand-up comedy monologue, the show features discussions and interviews related to current events, including news and popular culture. Occasionally Failla drives a taxi while comically interacting with a guest in the back seat, such as Jeanine Pirro, similar to his Fox Nation special Taxi Cab Comedy (except chatting with strangers).

Failla stated that Fox News Saturday Night would try to be more apolitical in its comedy, explaining that "true comedy doesn’t have a political party. Comedy is a party. And at a party, you don't ask who they voted for at the door." The final segment is known as "Last Call". Failla ends the show saying "you can be a Republican, you can be a Democrat, just don't be a dick!"

A majority of frequent guests are Fox News contributors such as Tom Shillue, Kennedy, Emily Compagno, Shannon Bream, Brian Kilmeade, Nicole Saphier, Charles Payne, Dagen McDowell, Tomi Lahren, Jason Chaffetz, Bill Hemmer, Dana Perino, Ainsley Earhardt and Carley Shimkus, among others. Notable guests have included Jon Taffer, Joe Piscopo, Sgt. Slaughter, Katie Pavlich (former Fox News journalist), Caroline Sunshine, Sammy Gravano, Vivek Ramaswamy, Mike Baker, Jim Florentine, Drew Pinsky, Steve Byrne, Mike Rowe, Jase Robertson, Francis Suarez, August Pfluger, Elizabeth Pipko, Tom Homan, Duane Chapman (Dog the Bounty Hunter), Winston Marshall, Neil deGrasse Tyson, Jim Norton, Lara Trump, Johnny Damon, Jeff Foxworthy, Jillian Michaels and more. Failla's wife and son have also appeared.

== Reception and ratings ==
Since the debut with Failla in January 2024, Fox News Saturday Night has drawn an average audience of 672,000 viewers, more than MSNBC and CNN combined in its time slot. By the end of December 2024, the show beat the competition with 944,000 viewers and 114,000 in the 25-54 age key demographic.

In October 2025, it was the top-rated program in the coveted 25-54 age demo on Saturday with 126,000 viewers. It has also ranked in the top ten and is currently the 10th most popular show on Fox News (68th overall on TV), watched by a total number of 1,273,000 people as of early June 2026.

Preceded by My View with Lara Trump	FOX News Saturday Night; 10:00 pm – 11:00 pm	Succeeded by Gutfeld! (repeat)
