= Guy Benson =

American talk radio host and journalist (born 1985)

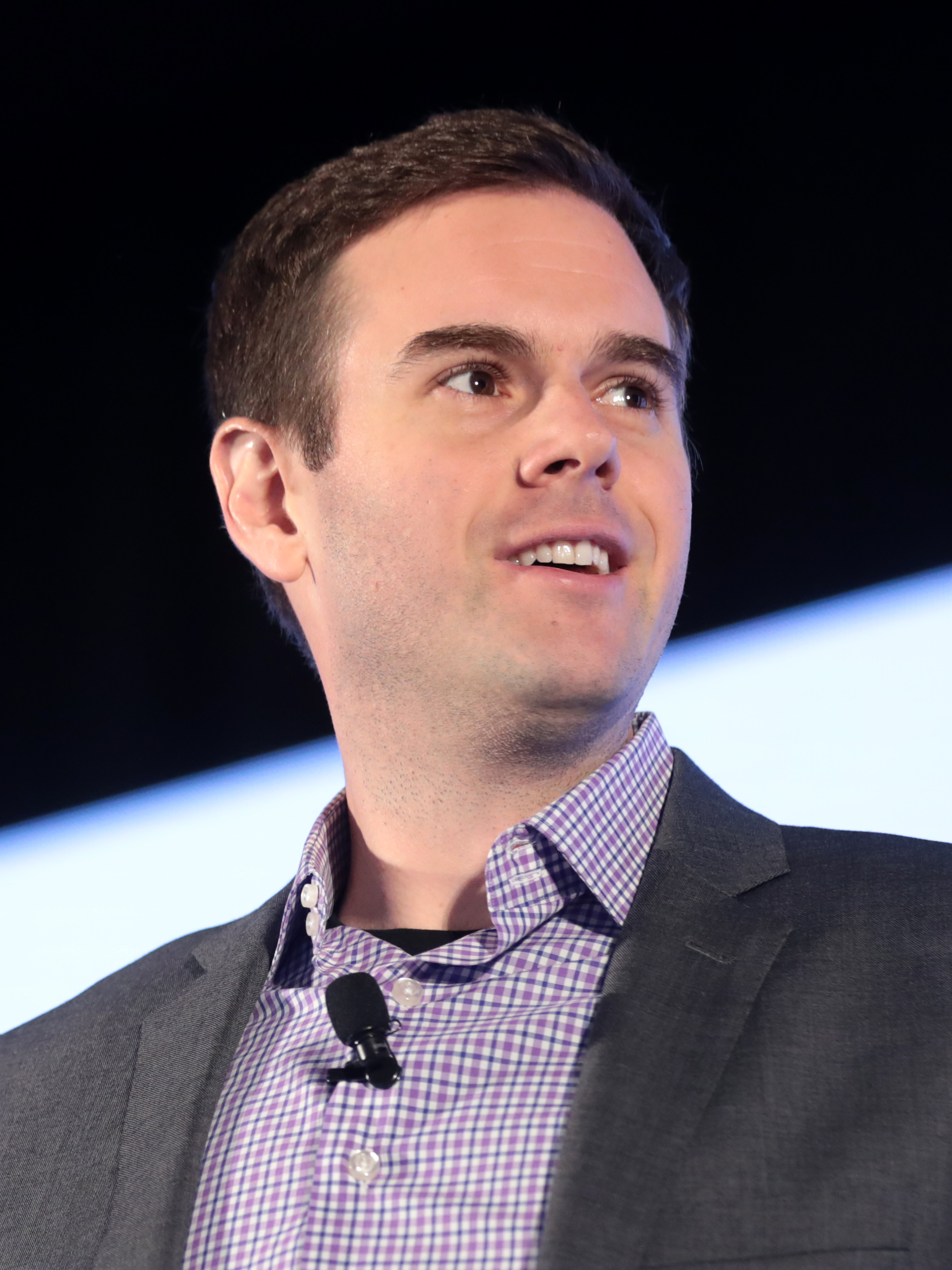
- Benson in 2019
- Born: Guy Pelham Benson; March 7, 1985 (age 41); Saudi Arabia
- Education: Northwestern University (B.J.)
- Occupations: Journalist, pundit
- Employers: Fox News Channel; Townhall.com
- Spouse: Adam Wise (m. 2019)
- Children: 1
- Website: www.guybensonshow.com

Guy Pelham Benson (born March 7, 1985) is an American columnist, commentator, and political pundit. He is a political editor of Townhall.com, a contributor to Fox News, and a conservative talk radio host on Fox News Radio and formerly for NPR.

Benson served as a fellow at the Georgetown Institute of Politics and Public Service during the spring 2021 academic semester. He is heard weekdays from 3 to 6 p.m. ET on the Westwood One radio network.

== Early life and education ==
Born in Saudi Arabia, Benson lived much of his early life overseas, then grew up in Ridgewood, New Jersey, where he attended middle school and Ridgewood High School. During high school, he was known for broadcasting sports on local television. While working toward his bachelor's degree at Northwestern University, Benson worked for the campus radio station, WNUR, broadcasting sporting events and hosting a political talk show. He also interned for two summers at Fox News, working primarily with Hannity & Colmes, before assisting the channel with its coverage of the 2004 Republican National Convention.

Benson also reported for an NPR station in South Florida, and from 2003 to 2006 broadcast summer baseball games for the Chatham A's of the Cape Cod Baseball League.

== Career ==
After graduating with honors from the Medill School of Journalism at Northwestern University in 2007, Benson served as the producer of The Sandy Rios Show, then a local afternoon radio show with Christian Right commentator Sandy Rios on WYLL-AM in Chicago. Rios moved to Washington, D.C., in July 2010.

In 2010, Benson became political editor at Townhall.com, where his columns had been published since February 2008.

Benson also contributes to Townhall's sister site, Hot Air. He previously wrote at Andrew Breitbart's "Big" sites and National Review Online's Media Blog. He serves as a regular guest and substitute host on The Hugh Hewitt Show.

In 2013, Benson joined Fox News as a contributor. He currently hosts The Guy Benson Show on Fox News Radio. In addition, he serves as a primary guest and substitute host on various Fox News/Fox Business programs such as Fox & Friends, America's Newsroom, Outnumbered, The Story with Martha MacCallum, Special Report, Gutfeld!, The Big Weekend Show, Media Buzz, Fox News Sunday,The Evening Edit, and The Bottom Line.

In April 2008 Benson discovered video from a 2007 reunion of the Weathermen, a radical left-wing group from the 1960s and 70s. The footage included quotes from two members, Bill Ayers and Bernardine Dohrn, defending their actions. Since Barack Obama was criticized during the 2008 presidential campaign for associating with Ayers and Dohrn, the clips made national news, from the Boston Globe to Fox News. Benson garnered national attention during the 2008 presidential race on two other occasions. In August, after the Obama campaign attacked WGN radio in Chicago for allowing Stanley Kurtz to appear on their station, Benson—who was in the studio during the interview—detailed his experience. Then, two weeks before Election Day, Benson joined with Mary Katharine Ham and Ed Morrissey to pen "The Comprehensive Argument Against Barack Obama," released on Hot Air.

== Views ==
With a mix of libertarian and conservative principles, Benson espouses limited government intervention, free-market economics, and individual liberties as foundational to American prosperity and freedom. He expresses his views as a "free-market, shrink-the-government conservative," prioritizing economic liberty and reduced state overreach in personal and commercial affairs. On social issues, Benson's libertarian inclinations manifest in support for same-sex marriage, which he defends from a conservative lens by arguing it promotes stable family structures and contractual freedom without necessitating government coercion on religious institutions.

== Honors, awards, distinctions ==
Benson has been included in the Forbes "30 Under 30" list in law and policy (2015), the Huffington Post "25 top millennial broadcasters" (2017), and the College Republican National Committee's Lee Atwater Award for conservative leadership. He was a Claremont Institute Lincoln Fellow in 2016.

== Personal life ==
Guy Benson came out as gay in May 2015 by announcing in advance of publication that his new book, End of Discussion, would include a footnote: "Guy here. So, I'm gay." Benson told an interviewer that "gay rights is not something that dominates my attentions — or my passions." He describes himself as a Christian, patriotic American, free-market conservative who happens to be gay, noting how low his sexual orientation ranks in his personal priorities.

In September 2019, Benson married Adam Wise. On November 25, 2023, Benson and Wise welcomed a son via a surrogate.

In October 2025, Benson announced on his radio program that he had been diagnosed with invasive melanoma. The cancer was detected at an early stage, surgically excised, and required no additional treatment beyond the procedure.

Benson's younger brother is actor, writer, and director James Benson.

== Books ==
- Benson, Guy; Ham, Mary Katherine (June 9, 2015). End of Discussion: How the Left's Outrage Industry Shuts Down Debate, Manipulates Voters, and Makes America Less Free (and Fun). New York, New York: Crown Forum. ISBN 978-0553447750.
