= Fox News @ Night =

American television news and talk program on Fox News Channel

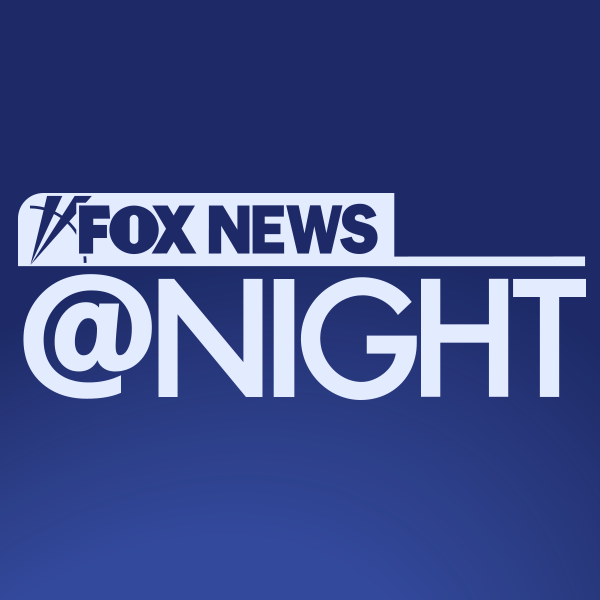
- Genre: News program
- Presented by: Trace Gallagher
- Country of origin: United States
- Original language: English
- No. of seasons: 8

Production
- Production location: Los Angeles
- Camera setup: Multi-camera
- Running time: 60 minutes
- Production company: Fox News

Original release
- Network: Fox News
- Release: October 30, 2017 – present

Fox News @ Night is an American current affairs program on Fox News and reruns on The Fox broadcast network hosted by Trace Gallagher. Episodes air live Monday through Friday from 11 p.m. to midnight ET. It is the channel's last live program on the weekday schedule. The program reports on the day's events and features interviews and political analysis.

The show has been a part of the Fox News weekday lineup since October 30, 2017.

Guest hosts for Gallagher include Kevin Corke, Jonathan Hunt, Gillian Turner, and Mike Emanuel.

== Anchors ==
- Shannon Bream (2017—2022): Founding host of the show, as Fox News @ Night W/Shannon Bream, departed the program on August 30, 2022, after she was named permanent host of Fox News Sunday. Replaced by Trace Gallagher.
- Trace Gallagher (2022—present): Host of Fox News @ Night W/Trace Gallagher. Gallagher, who has been with Fox since its inception, serves as Fox News' Chief Breaking News correspondent. He was named permanent host of the program in September 2022 following the departure of founding host Shannon Bream when she was named anchor of Fox News Sunday.

== Broadcast history ==
The show premiered on October 30, 2017, at 11 p.m., a time slot which traditionally carried repeats of the 8 p.m. shows The O'Reilly Factor and Tucker Carlson Tonight. In March 2020, the program was temporarily extended to 1 a.m. to provide additional COVID-19 pandemic coverage.

In April 2021, Fox News @ Night moved to midnight ET with the premiere of the channel's new late-night talk show Gutfeld!. Fox News @ Night became, for a period, the only regularly-scheduled program across the United States' major cable news channels to air live after midnight ET.

On September 21, 2022, Trace Gallagher was named host of the program following the departure of Shannon Bream. Due to Gallagher living in California the show now broadcasts from Fox News' Los Angeles bureau. The show had been broadcast from Fox News' Washington, D.C. bureau since its inception.

In June 2023, as part of a realignment of Fox News Channel's primetime schedule following the cancellation of Tucker Carlson Tonight, it was announced that Fox News @ Night would move back to 11 p.m. beginning July 17.

Fox News Channel nightly schedule
Preceded by Gutfeld! as 10:00 PM – 11:00 AM	Fox News @ Night; 11:00 PM – 12:00 AM	Succeeded by The Five (replay) as 12:00 AM – 1:00 AM
