= Fox News Sunday =

News program

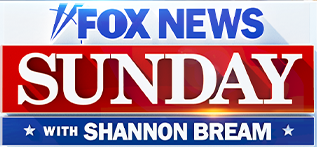
- Created by: Roger Ailes
- Presented by: Tony Snow; Chris Wallace; Shannon Bream
- Country of origin: United States
- Original language: English
- No. of seasons: 28
- No. of episodes: 1,476

Production
- Production locations: Fox News Washington Bureau; 400 N Capitol Street NW; Washington, D.C., U.S.
- Camera setup: Multi-camera
- Running time: 60 minutes

Original release
- Network: Fox; Fox News
- Release: April 28, 1996 – present

Fox News Sunday is a Sunday morning talk show that has aired on the broadcast Fox network since 1996, as a presentation of Fox News Channel. It is the only regularly scheduled Fox News program carried on the main Fox broadcast network. Hosted by Shannon Bream since 2022, the show features interviews with some of the biggest newsmakers in politics from the previous week and "takes on the week's hot political topics", in addition to panel discussions with other Fox contributors and a "power player of the week", which typically is a non-political "feel good" story to end the program.

== Host ==
- Shannon Bream (2022–present): Bream, who has been with Fox News since 2007 and was the host of Fox News @ Night for five years, was named the permanent host to replace Chris Wallace on August 11, 2022. She also serves as Fox News' Chief Legal Correspondent. Bream is also the first woman to officially host the program since its airing.

== Former anchors ==
- Tony Snow (1996–2003): Founding anchor of the show, Snow left to become the White House Press Secretary for President George W. Bush. Snow died on July 12, 2008.
- Chris Wallace (2003–2021): Wallace joined Fox News in October 2003, where he replaced Snow as host of Fox News Sunday. Considered by then-Fox president Roger Ailes to be "one of the best interviewers in the business", Wallace hosted the show for 18 years, during which time he secured high-profile interviews with key figures from across the political spectrum, including Barack Obama's first interview on Fox News after he became president. Wallace also interviewed Russian president Vladimir Putin in 2018, where he received praise for challenging Putin's alleged interference in the 2016 election and asking "why so many" of his political enemies "end up dead". Wallace abruptly announced his departure from Fox News on December 12, 2021, and later announced that he would be joining CNN's new streaming service CNN+ to host his own show. Wallace's CNN+ show was cancelled after the network announced that their new streaming service would be shutting down on April 30 due to low user subscriptions a month after launching. Wallace now hosts a talk show for HBO Max along with a new show for CNN on Sunday nights.

== Overview ==
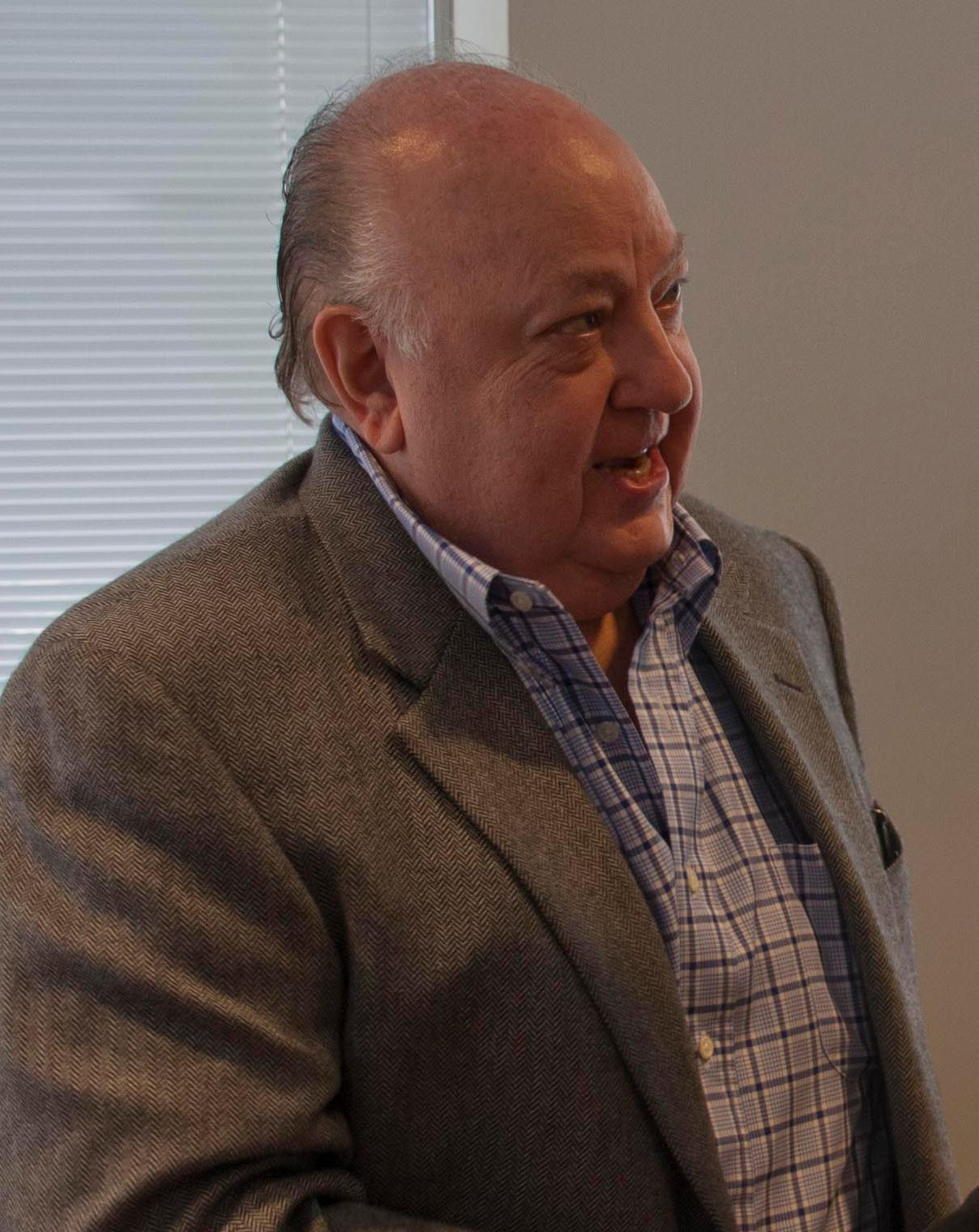
Creator Roger Ailes in 2013

The program began on April 28, 1996, 5 1/2 months prior to the launch of the network's sister cable news network Fox News Channel. Because Fox News was still building out its studio facilities, it aired during that time from historic Washington venues until Fox News Channel launched and the news operation's Washington bureau was opened. The show was the first network news show to stream live on the Internet. The show was also the first to incorporate live user commentary. Users posted on an Internet BBS and the Internet Producer moderated by choosing and posting the comments in the screen's lower third. The show airs live at 9:00 a.m. Eastern Time, although many Fox stations can choose to broadcast it at a later time slot. The program is also rebroadcast on Fox News Channel the same day at 2:00 p.m ET and 2:00 a.m ET

An audio-only broadcast of the program is also carried on a number of radio stations. Most of these stations are owned by iHeartMedia (the former Clear Channel Communications), the largest radio station group that runs the division's Fox News Radio newscasts, along with WCSP-FM (C-SPAN Radio) in the Washington area and over the Internet, as part of its weekly audio airings of the major Sunday morning talk shows. In August 2008, Fox News Sunday began to be produced in high definition.

== Format ==
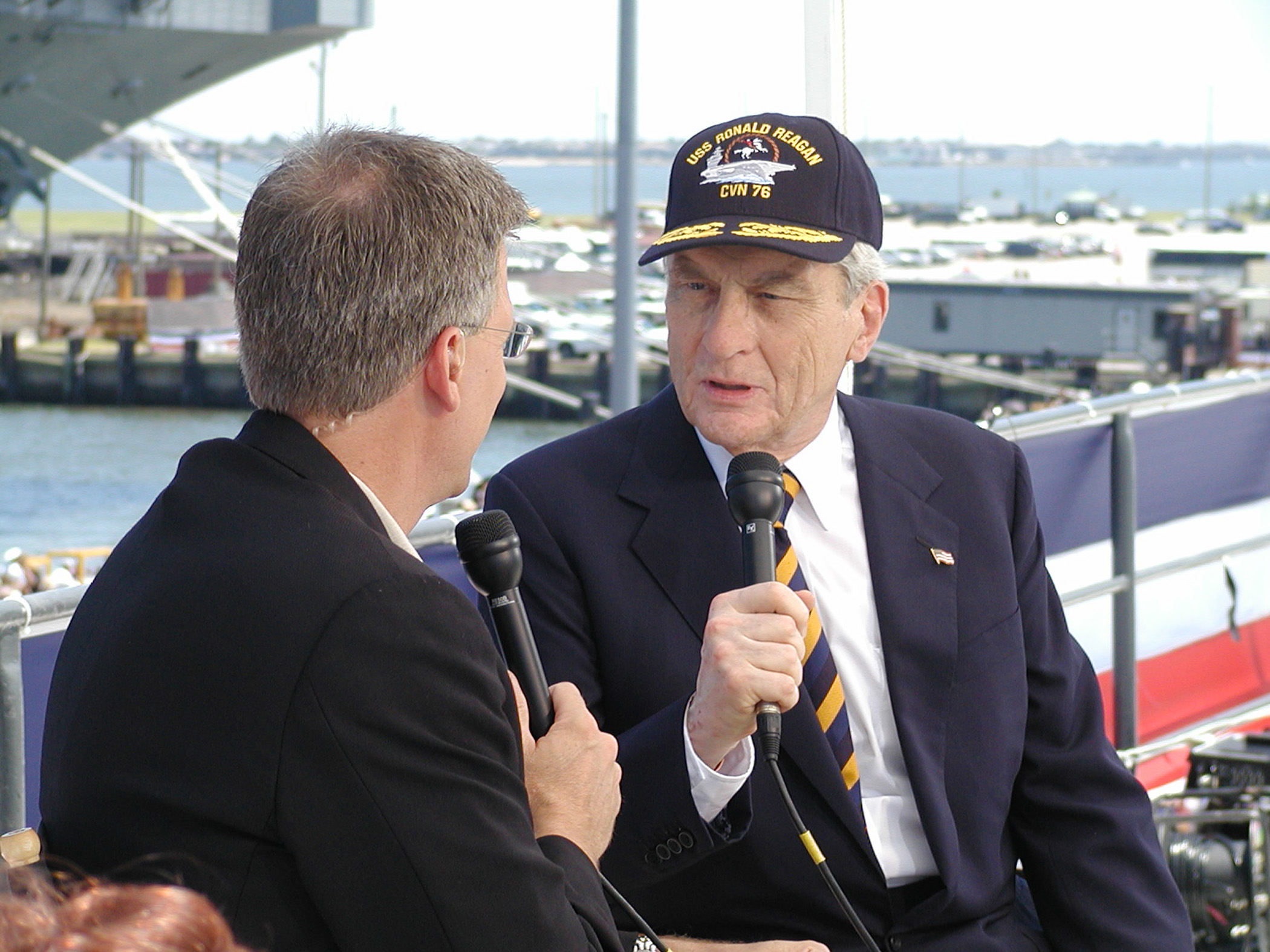
Tony Snow interviewing John Warner in 2003

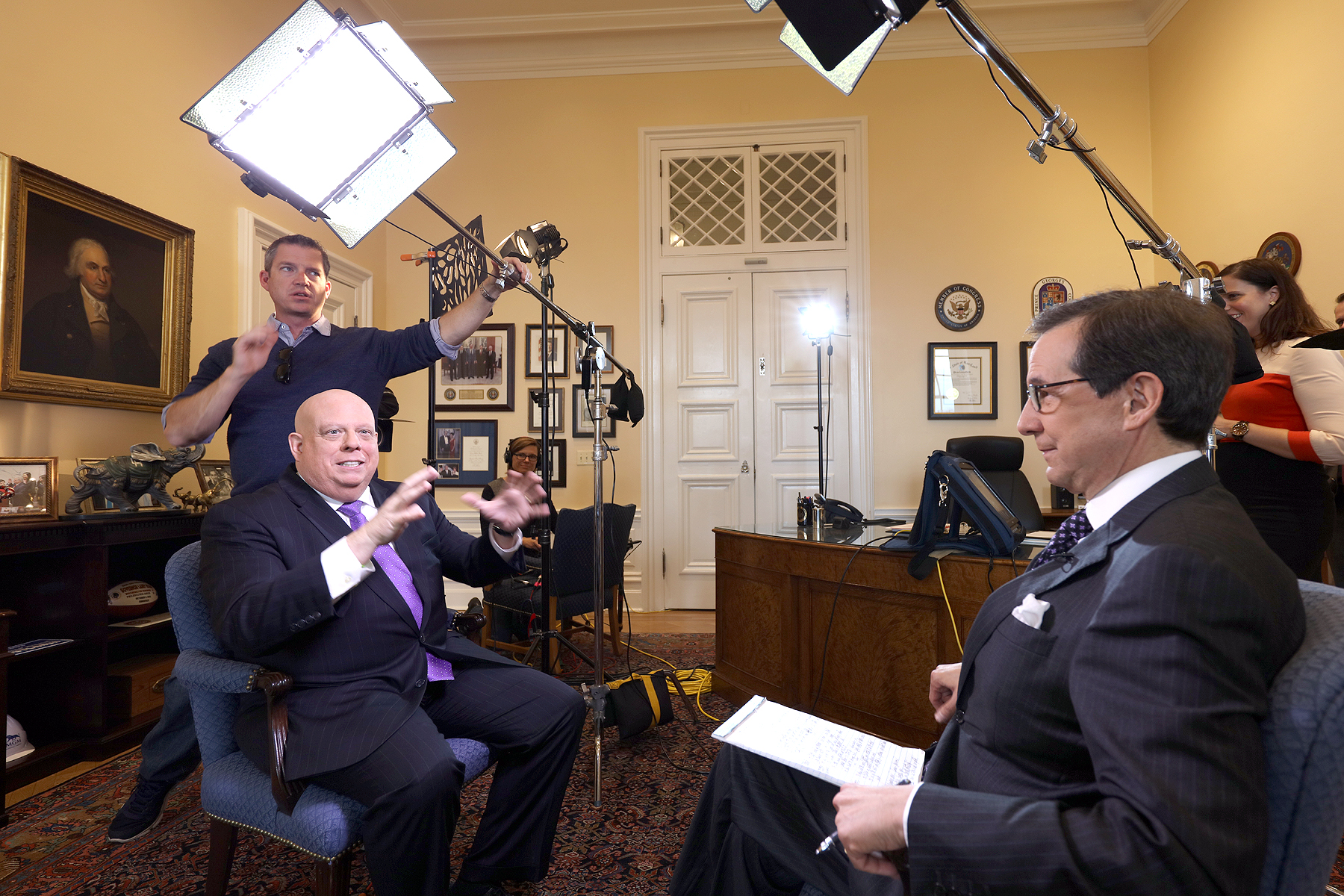
Chris Wallace interviewing Maryland governor Larry Hogan in 2015

The first minutes of the broadcast runs down the day's headlines, since Fox (unlike the Big Three television networks), does not have a conventional national morning news program that leads into Fox News Sunday. Additionally, a limited number of Fox's affiliates have local news programs leading into it. For the rest of the first half of the show, the host interviews news makers from the prior week.

During the second half of the show, the host introduces a panel of four pundits to speak about the political impact of the news. Regular members of the panel include the following people:

- Brit Hume, Fox News senior political analyst
- Mara Liasson, NPR correspondent
- Juan Williams, columnist for The Hill and Fox News senior political analyst
- Dana Perino, co-host of America's Newsroom, The Five and former White House press secretary
- Guy Benson, host of The Guy Benson Show on Fox News Radio
- Katie Pavlich, Fox News contributor, Townhall editor
- Trey Gowdy, former South Carolina congressman, host of Sunday Night in America with Trey Gowdy
- Susan Page, Washington bureau chief for USA Today
- Charles Lane, writer for The Washington Post
- Marie Harf, former deputy spokesperson for the United States Department of State
- Mo Elleithee, Fox News contributor
- Jacqui Heinrich, Fox News White House correspondent for president Joe Biden
- Charles Hurt, Washington Times writer
- Harold Ford Jr., former Tennessee congressman and co-host of The Five
- Jennifer Griffin, Fox News Chief national security correspondent
- Jason L. Riley, Wall Street Journal journalist
- Peter Doocy, Fox News White House correspondent for president Biden
- Julie Pace, senior vice president of the Associated Press
- Howard Kurtz, host of MediaBuzz and Fox News chief media analyst
- Mollie Hemingway, senior editor of The Federalist
- Morgan Ortagus, former spokesperson for the United States Department of State
- Byron York, chief political correspondent for the Washington Examiner
- Josh Kraushaar, senior political correspondent for Axios
- Olivia Beavers, Capitol Hill reporter for Politico
- Jason Chaffetz, former Utah congressman, Fox News Contributor

The program ends with a short segment focusing on a "Power Player of the Week", usually a short, non-political "feel good" story about a person who has made a significant contribution to society.

Guest hosts for the program include Mike Emanuel, Gillian Turner, Jennifer Griffin and Bill Hemmer.
