= Jimmy Failla =

American comedian, radio host and TV personality (born 1976)

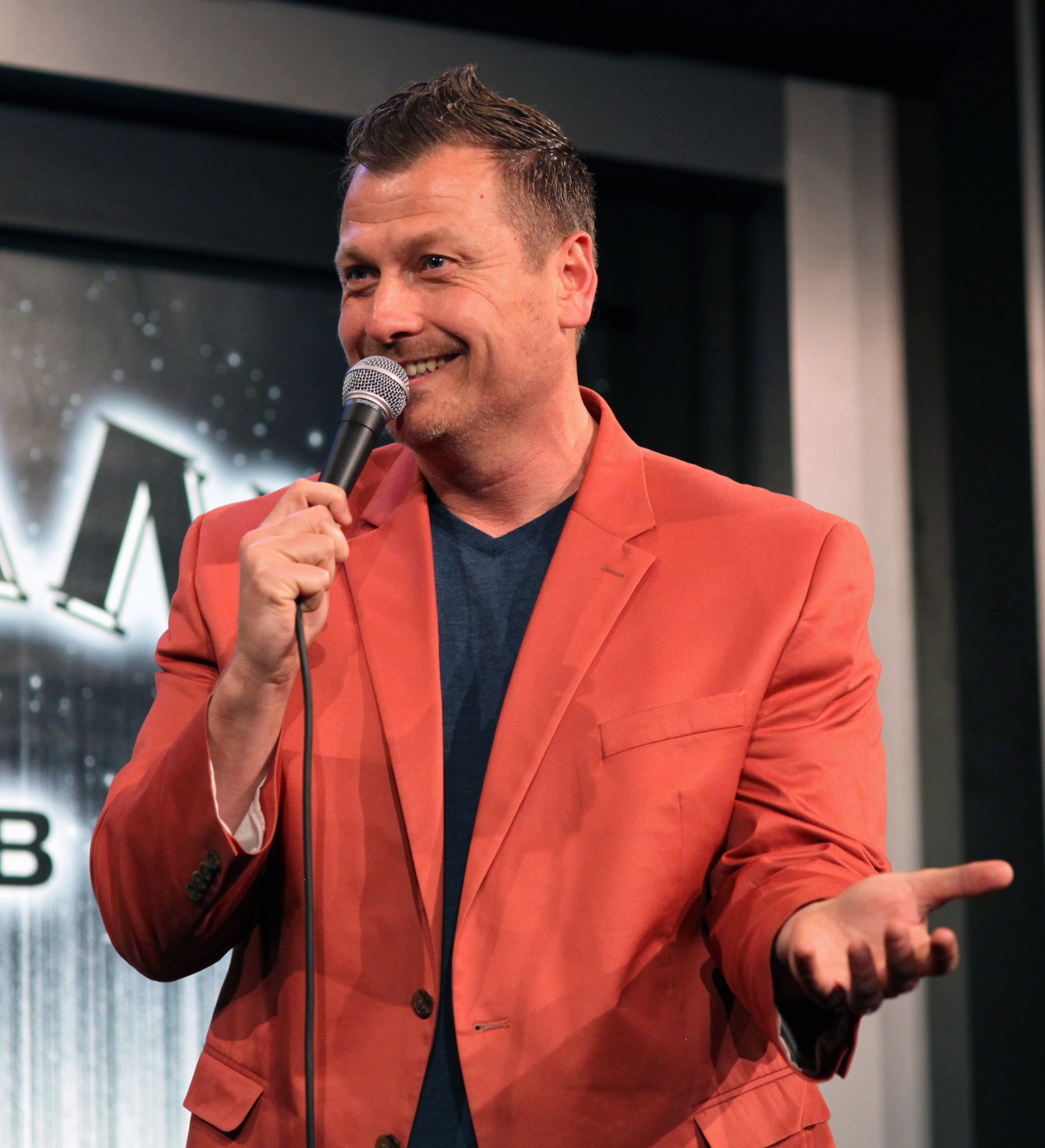
- Gotham Comedy Club on May 2, 2016
- Born: James Failla; December 17, 1976 (age 49); Levittown, New York, U.S.
- Occupations: Comedian, radio host, television personality, author
- Years active: 2000s–present

James Failla (born December 17, 1976) is an American stand-up comedian, radio host, television personality, and author. He hosts the syndicated radio show Fox Across America with Jimmy Failla and the Fox News program Fox News Saturday Night. Failla is also known for his work as a cab driver turned comedian, with appearances on various television shows and a New York Times best-selling author.

== Early life ==
Failla was born on December 17, 1976, in Levittown, New York, and grew up in a working-class family. He attended Division Avenue High School and later Nassau Community College.

== Career ==
=== Stand-up comedy ===
Failla began his career as a New York City cab driver before transitioning into stand-up comedy. He was named Outstanding Male Comedian of the Year in 2014 at the New York City Nightlife Awards and released a one-hour special, State of the Union, on Amazon Prime Video. He co-created the viral YouTube video Snakes in a Cab.

=== Radio ===
From 2010 to 2015, Failla hosted Off the Meter with Jimmy Failla. He now hosts the syndicated Fox Across America with Jimmy Failla, which airs weekdays on 165 stations, offering humorous commentary on politics and culture. He has also provided satirical content for A-List Comedy to over 200 radio stations.

=== Television ===
Failla's television appearances include NBC's America's Got Talent, ESPN's Dream Job, BBC America's Richard Hammond's Crash Course, and The Today Show. He served as head writer for Fox Business Network's Kennedy Show from 2017 to 2020. Since January 2024, he hosts Fox News Saturday Night and frequently appears on programs such as Hannity, Watters' World, and The Ingraham Angle. He released a Fox Nation comedy special, They're Just Jokes.

=== Writing ===
Failla is a New York Times best-selling author with books:

- Failla, Jimmy (April 2013). Follow That Car!: A Cabbie’s Guide to Overcoming Fears. ISBN 978-1937114077.
- Failla, Jimmy (January 30, 2024). Cancel Culture Dictionary: An A to Z Guide to Winning the War on Fun. New York City: Broadside Books. ISBN 978-0063325685.

He contributes columns to The Federalist.

== Other work ==
Failla has been a spokesperson for the Flipps app.

== Personal life ==
Failla lives on Long Island with his wife, Jenny, whom he married on August 19, 2006, and their son, Lincoln.
