= Kevin Corke =

American journalist

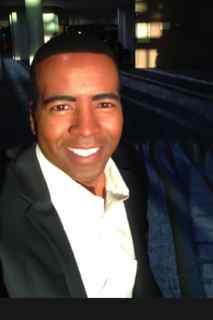
Kevin Corke

Kevin Corke is an American journalist and is presently a White House Correspondents' Association member for Fox News in Washington D.C. Corke has covered four U.S. administrations (Bush, Obama, Trump, Biden). Previously, he was a national news correspondent based in Washington, D.C. for NBC News from 2004 to 2008. While much of his work there involved coverage of the Bush administration as a member of the White House Press Corps, Corke also frequently reported from The Pentagon, U.S. Supreme Court and other locations in Washington, D.C. Corke figured prominently in Fox's coverage of the 2020 summer protests and previously was part of NBC's coverage of the Virginia Tech shooting.

Previously, Corke was a news anchor at WTVJ-TV NBC in Miami.

Corke also has been frequently seen as a play-by-play sports broadcaster for ESPN. Corke was an anchor and coordinating producer at ESPN in Bristol, Connecticut. While there, he could be seen anchoring SportsCenter, the network's flagship program. Corke was also a sportscaster at 9News KUSA in Denver.

Corke covered the Olympic Games in Torino and Atlanta, the former while a correspondent at NBC News.

Corke is a graduate of Harvard University, where he earned a master's degree, and received the Littauer Fellow citation for academic excellence, leadership and commitment to work in the public interest. He has also served as a board member of the Harvard Club of Washington, D.C. He graduated from the University of Colorado Boulder, where he earned master's and bachelor's degrees in journalism.

Kevin Corke has won numerous journalism awards, among them national and regional Emmys. Corke is a Life Member of Kappa Alpha Psi fraternity.
