= The Big Weekend Show =

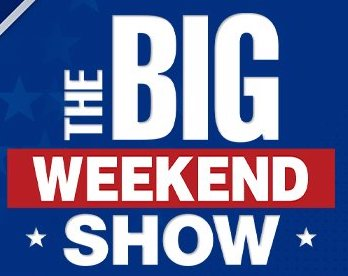
- Also known as: The Big Saturday Show and The Big Sunday Show (2021–2023)
- Genre: Talk show; News program
- Presented by: Joey Jones; Tomi Lahren; Rotating Hosts
- No. of seasons: 4

Production
- Production location: 1211 Avenue of the Americas (News Corp. Building) in New York City
- Running time: 180 minutes
- Production company: Fox News

Original release
- Network: Fox News Channel
- Release: February 27, 2021 – present

The Big Weekend Show (also The Big Saturday Show and The Big Sunday Show from 2021 to 2023) is an American panel talk show on Fox News in which Joey Jones, Tomi Lahren and various Fox News personalities discuss current stories, political issues, and pop culture. The program airs live every Saturday and Sundays from 5 p.m. to 8 p.m. ET.

== Format ==
The show is made up of six blocks. Each of the first five blocks is introduced, closed and loosely moderated by a different co-host. The co-host's block may have a single topic or multiple topics. On Saturdays, the show ends with a segment called "The Big Weekend Flops", highlighting the biggest fails of the week. On Sundays, the show ends with a segment called "The Big Four", in which the hosts share what they believe are the biggest stories of the week.

The show is similar to Fox News' other successful talk shows such as The Five, Outnumbered, and Gutfeld!.

The program averages between 900,000 and 1 million viewers per episode.

== Hosts ==
Since the show's inception in 2021, the program has featured a rotation of various Fox News/Fox Business personalities. Some of the regular hosts featured include the following:

=== Main hosts ===
- Johnny "Joey" Jones: (2025–present) Fox News contributor
- Tomi Lahren: (2025–present) Fox News contributor and host of Tomi Lahren is Fearless on the OutKick sports news website

=== Rotating hosts ===
- Guy Benson, host of The Guy Benson Show on Fox News Radio
- Alicia Acuna, Fox News correspondent
- Lisa Boothe, Fox News contributor and host of The Truth with Lisa Boothe on IHeartRadio
- Molly Line, Fox News correspondent
- David Webb, Fox News contributor, SiriusXM radio host
- Todd Piro, co-host of Fox & Friends First
- Julie Banderas, Fox News anchor
- Tom Shillue, Fox Nation host
- Anita Vogel, Fox News anchor
- Marc Siegel, Fox News senior medical anaylst
- Jason Chaffetz, Fox News Contributor, former Utah Congressman
- Joe Concha, Fox News contributor
- Kennedy, host of the Kennedy Saves The World podcast on Fox News Radio
- Gianno Caldwell, Fox News political analyst
- Lauren Simonetti, Fox Business Correspondent and Anchor
- Taylor Riggs, host of The Big Money Show on Fox Business
- Kevin Corke, Fox News senior national correspondent
- Lydia Hu, Fox Business correspondent
- Mary Katharine Ham, Fox News contributor, Outkick.com columnist
- Brian Brenberg, host of The Big Money Show on Fox Business
- Arthel Neville, Fox News anchor
- Madison Alworth, Fox Business correspondent
- Kaylee McGhee White, Fox News contributor
- Riley Gaines, host of the Gaines for Girls podcast on OutKick

== History ==
The show originally debuted on February 27, 2021, with hosts Lawrence B. Jones, Gillian Turner, Lisa Boothe and Sean Duffy. The program was featured regularly on weekends and was officially named part of Fox News' lineup in May 2021.

In May 2023, Fox News announced that The Big Saturday/Sunday show would be renamed The Big Weekend Show and would be moving from the 5 p.m. ET time slot to the 7 p.m. ET slot on June 3, 2023.

In February 2024 the show drew significant criticism for a discussion about a new line of sneakers launched by Donald Trump. Co-host Raymond Arroyo said "(these shoes are) connecting with Black America because they love sneakers. This is a big deal, certainly in the inner city. So when you have Trump roll out his sneaker line, they're like, 'wait a minute, this is cool.' He's reaching them on a level that defies and is above politics." These comments were called "outright racist" by some and traded in "harmful stereotypes" about African Americans and their intelligence. Arroyo has not been seen on the program since.

On January 13, 2025, it was announced that the show would expand to two hours beginning on January 18.

In September 2025 it was announced that Johnny "Joey" Jones and Tomi Lahren were named permanent co-hosts of the program and that the show would expand to three hours airing from 5pm-8pm beginning on September 20.

Preceded by Fox Report	The Big Weekend Show; 6:00 pm – 8:00 pm	Succeeded by Life, Liberty & Levin
