= Suzanne Scott =

Fox News CEO

- Born: 1965 or 1966 (age 60–61)
- Education: American University (BA)
- Occupation: Media executive
- Known for: CEO of Fox News
- Spouse: Preston Scott
- Children: 1

Suzanne Scott is the current CEO of Fox News, the second CEO in the network's history. She was ranked 61st in Forbes's 2021 list of the World's 100 Most Powerful Women.

== Early life and education ==
Scott was raised in Parsippany, New Jersey. Her father ran a trucking company out of the family home, and her mother worked as a real estate agent. She is a 1988 graduate of American University.

== Career ==
Scott worked as an executive assistant to Chet Collier at CNBC before moving with him to Fox News at its inception in 1996. She began her work there as a programming assistant.

According to a 2018 Fox News Channel press release, "Throughout her tenure at Fox News, Scott has risen through the ranks in a number of programming, production and creative positions including: executive vice president of programming (2016); senior vice president of programming and development (2009); vice president of programming (2007); network executive producer (2005); as well as associate producer, producer and senior producer of On the Record with Greta Van Susteren (2002–2005). In addition, she was responsible for the launch of numerous on-air and digital initiatives, including the 2002 primetime debut of On the Record."

After founder and former CEO Roger Ailes departed in 2016 but before he died in 2017, Scott, Jay Wallace, and Jack Abernethy are credited with "turning Fox News around" after the scandal involving Ailes. In that time, Scott worked as the president of programming, overseeing Fox News Channel's opinion shows including Fox & Friends, The Five and Hannity.

On May 17, 2018, Scott was named CEO of both Fox News and Fox Business Network. During this announcement, Lachlan Murdoch said Scott "has now made history as [Fox's] first female CEO." She was also the only woman in charge of a major TV news organization until Rashida Jones was installed as head of MSNBC. The decision to elevate Scott was not, however, universally praised due to her alleged complicity in several sexual harassment suits within the company. Scott was not a defendant in the suits, but was cited within them, and was involved in several internal complaints. She denies the accusations.

On March 30, 2023, the Guardian reported she was furious when one of the network's reporters was fact-checking Donald Trump's false claims about the 2020 election, writing it was "bad for business".

Business positions
Preceded by Roger Ailes	CEO, Fox News; 2018-present	Succeeded by incumbent
