= Life, Liberty & Levin =

- Genre: Political
- Created by: Suzanne Scott
- Presented by: Mark Levin
- Country of origin: United States
- Original language: English
- No. of seasons: 8 (As of 2025)
- No. of episodes: 370

Production
- Running time: 60 minutes

Original release
- Network: Fox News
- Release: February 25, 2018 – present

Life, Liberty & Levin is an American political talk show hosted by conservative personality Mark Levin and broadcast by Fox News. It premiered on February 25, 2018. Each week features a long-form interview with one or two guests for the hour.

In November 2017, Fox News announced that it had signed Levin for a weekend talk show to air on Sunday nights, beginning in February 2018. The program explores the “fundamental values and principles undergirding American society, culture, politics, and current events, and their relevance to the nation's future and everyday lives of citizens." The show currently airs new episodes on Saturdays and Sundays at 8:00 PM ET, with a repeat airing at 11:00 PM ET.

Although most episodes have guests in-studio, Levin conducted interviews via video chat during the COVID-19 pandemic. Levin resumed in-person interviews on August 2, 2020, when he hosted Sean Hannity.

In September 2023 it was announced that the show would be expanding to both Saturday and Sunday night broadcasts beginning on September 16.

== Frequent guests ==
Below are a list of personalities that frequently contribute to the show.

- Sean Hannity: host of Hannity
- Kayleigh McEnany: co-host of Outnumbered, former White house Press Secretary
- Joe Concha: Fox News Contributor, Media Columnist for The Hill
- Pete Hegseth: former co-host of Fox & Friends Weekend, Secretary of War
- Leo Terrell: former Fox News Contributor, Civil Rights Attorney
- Ron DeSantis: Governor of Florida, 2024 Presidential Candidate
- Peter Schweizer: Author
- Mollie Hemingway: Fox News Contributor
- Victor Davis Hanson: Senior fellow at the Hoover Institute

| Preceded by The Big Weekend Show | Life, Liberty & Levin (Saturday Broadcast); 8:00 PM ET – 9:00 PM ET | Succeeded by My View with Lara Trump |

| Preceded by The Big Weekend Show | Life, Liberty & Levin (Sunday Broadcast); 8:00 PM ET – 9:00 PM ET | Succeeded by One Nation with Brian Kilmeade |
