= Charles Hurt =

American political commentator

Charlie Hurt
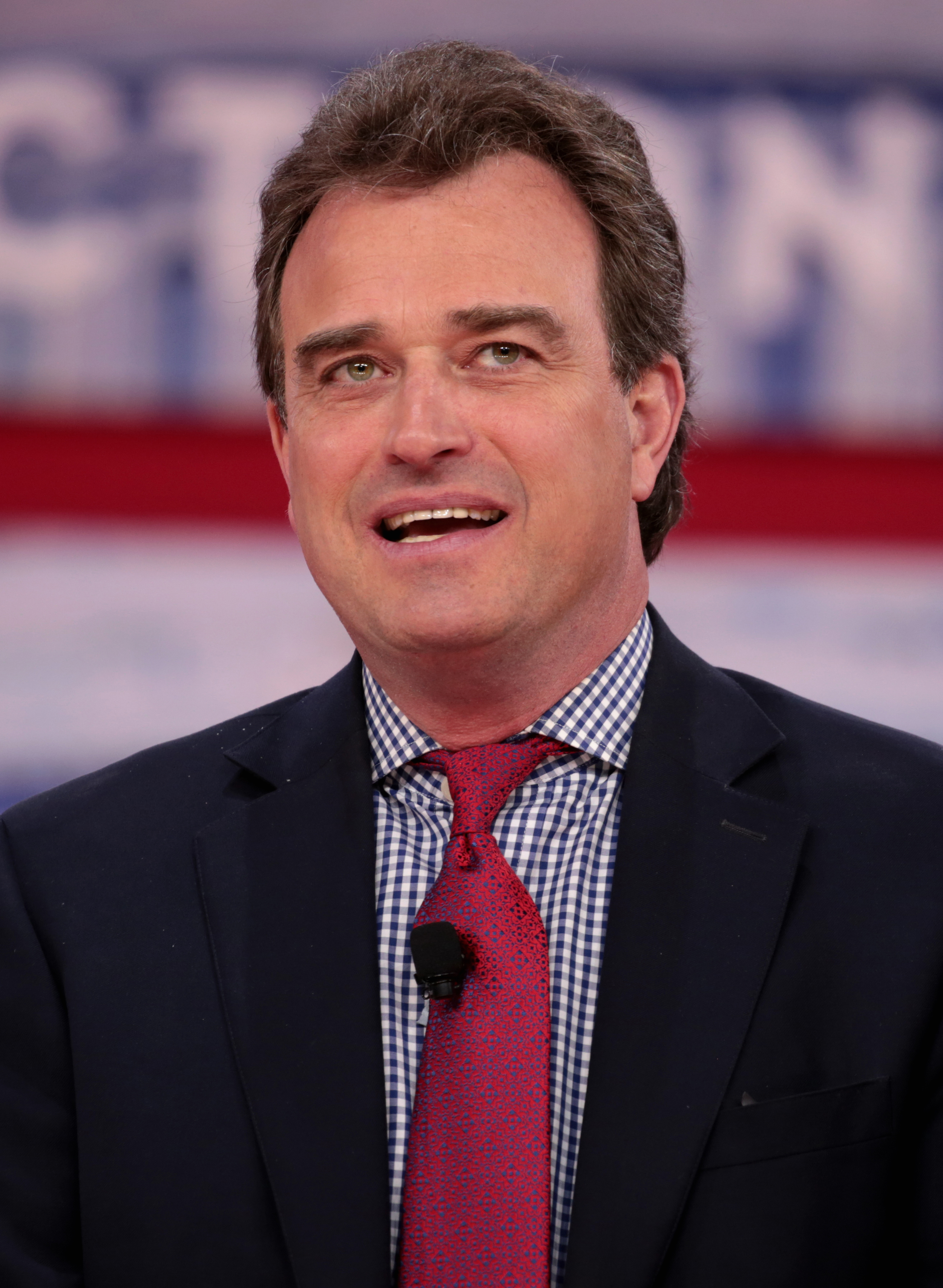
- Hurt in 2018
- Born: November 3, 1971 (age 54); Chatham, Virginia
- Education: Hampden-Sydney College
- Occupations: Columnist, political commentator
- Spouse: Stephanie Hurt
- Children: 3
- Relatives: Robert Hurt (brother)

Henry Charles Hurt III (born November 3, 1971) is an American political commentator. He is currently the opinion editor of The Washington Times, as well as a co-host of Fox & Friends Weekend. Hurt's views have been considered to be Republican-leaning.

== Career ==
Hurt began his newspaper career as a boy in Chatham, Virginia, writing and publishing the "Gilmer Gazette," named for the street on which he lived. During college at Hampden-Sydney College in Virginia he did stints at the Danville Register & Bee, the Richmond Times-Dispatch and the St. Louis Post-Dispatch. His first full-time job after graduating in 1995 was at The Detroit News where he became a replacement worker during a bitter strike. He worked at the paper until 2001, when he moved to the Washington, D.C. area to join the staff of The Charlotte Observer.

From 2003 to 2007, Hurt covered the U.S. Congress as a reporter for The Washington Times before leaving to join The New York Post. Hurt was The New York Post's D.C. Bureau Chief and news columnist covering the White House for five years.

In 2011, he rejoined The Washington Times as a political columnist. In December 2016, Hurt was named the opinion editor.

National Review editor Rich Lowry described Hurt as "an early adopter of Donald Trump populism."

In January 2025, it was announced that he was named co-host of Fox & Friends Weekend.

== Personal life ==
Hurt was born in Chatham, Virginia. Hurt is the son of investigative journalist and former Reader's Digest editor Henry C. Hurt and his wife, Margaret Nolting Williams. His older brother, Robert Hurt, is a former United States Congressman. Charles Hurt had been a possible congressional candidate before his brother's term ended in 2016. Hurt and his wife, Stephanie, have three children.
