= My View with Lara Trump =

American talk show (2025–present)

- Also known as: My View
- Genre: News program; Current affairs; Opinion-based; Talk show
- Created by: Suzanne Scott
- Presented by: Lara Trump
- No. of seasons: 1
- No. of episodes: 22

Production
- Production locations: New York City; Florida
- Running time: 60 minutes

Original release
- Network: Fox News
- Release: February 22, 2025 – present

My View with Lara Trump is an American television program that airs on Fox News and is hosted by Lara Trump, the daughter-in-law of the 45th and 47th President of the United States Donald Trump. The program airs every Saturday at 9 p.m. ET from either the Fox News headquarters in New York City or her Florida home studio.

Taking over the slot held by One Nation with Brian Kilmeade, which was moved to Sunday, it features commentary and conversations with notable people. The first episode premiered on February 22, 2025, and was watched by 2.4 million people according to Nielsen Ratings. The premiere episode included appearances by Tulsi Gabbard, the Director of National Intelligence; Pam Bondi, the United States Attorney General; and Karoline Leavitt, the White House Press Secretary.

The show enabled her to share her thoughts with conservative audiences, influencing how they view the second presidency of Donald Trump. Eric Cortellessa of Time magazine called the show "a capstone in the symbiotic relationship between Trump and Fox".

== Reception ==
Catherine Bouris of The Daily Beast criticized the show, saying that "the interviews were fairly painful to watch" since it is obvious each person is "attempting to hit talking points that have been approved by the powers-that-be". She concluded, "This presidential pandering makes the entire show feel like little more than incredibly amateur theater rather than something that passes for journalism."
