= Tomi Lahren =

American political commentator (born 1992)

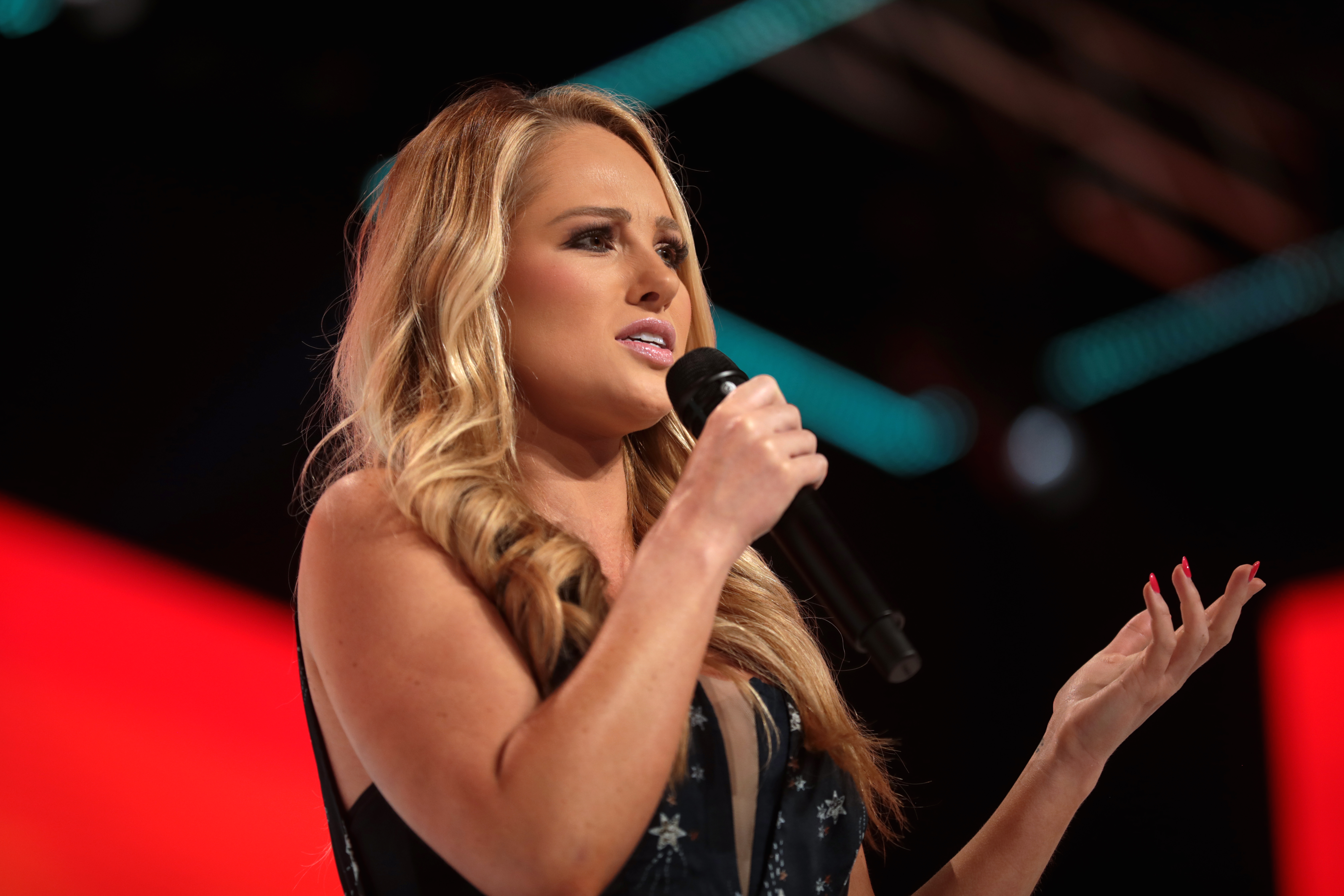
- Lahren in 2021
- Born: Tomi Rae Augustus Lahren; August 11, 1992 (age 34); Rapid City, South Dakota, U.S.
- Education: University of Nevada, Las Vegas (BA)
- Occupation: Political commentator
- Employer: Fox News Channel
- Political party: Republican
- Spouse: J. P. Arencibia (m. 2022)

Tomi Rae Augustus Lahren (/ˈtɒmi ˈlærən/; born August 11, 1992) is an American conservative political commentator and television presenter. She hosted Tomi on TheBlaze, where she gained attention for her short video segments called "Final Thoughts", in which she frequently criticized liberal politics. Many of her videos went viral, with The New York Times describing her as "the Right's rising media star". Lahren was suspended from TheBlaze in March 2017 after saying in an interview on The View that she believed women should have legal access to abortion.

Shortly thereafter, she began working for Great America Alliance, an advocacy organization that supports Donald Trump. In August 2017, she joined Fox News, where she appears as a contributor on several different shows across the Fox News and Fox Business networks, and often appears as a guest co-host on Outnumbered as well as various other Fox News programs. She currently hosts a talk show on Fox Nation, No Interruption. In June 2022, she was named host of a new show on OutKick called Tomi Lahren Is Fearless.

== Early life and education ==
Lahren grew up in Rapid City, South Dakota, and graduated from Central High School in 2010. She is of German and Norwegian descent. Lahren's parents both came from families who owned ranches. She graduated from University of Nevada, Las Vegas, in 2014 with a B.A. in broadcast journalism and political science. Lahren hosted and associate produced the university's political roundtable show The Scramble. She interned for Republican congresswoman Kristi Noem from South Dakota, serving as the first intern at Noem's Rapid City office.

== Career ==
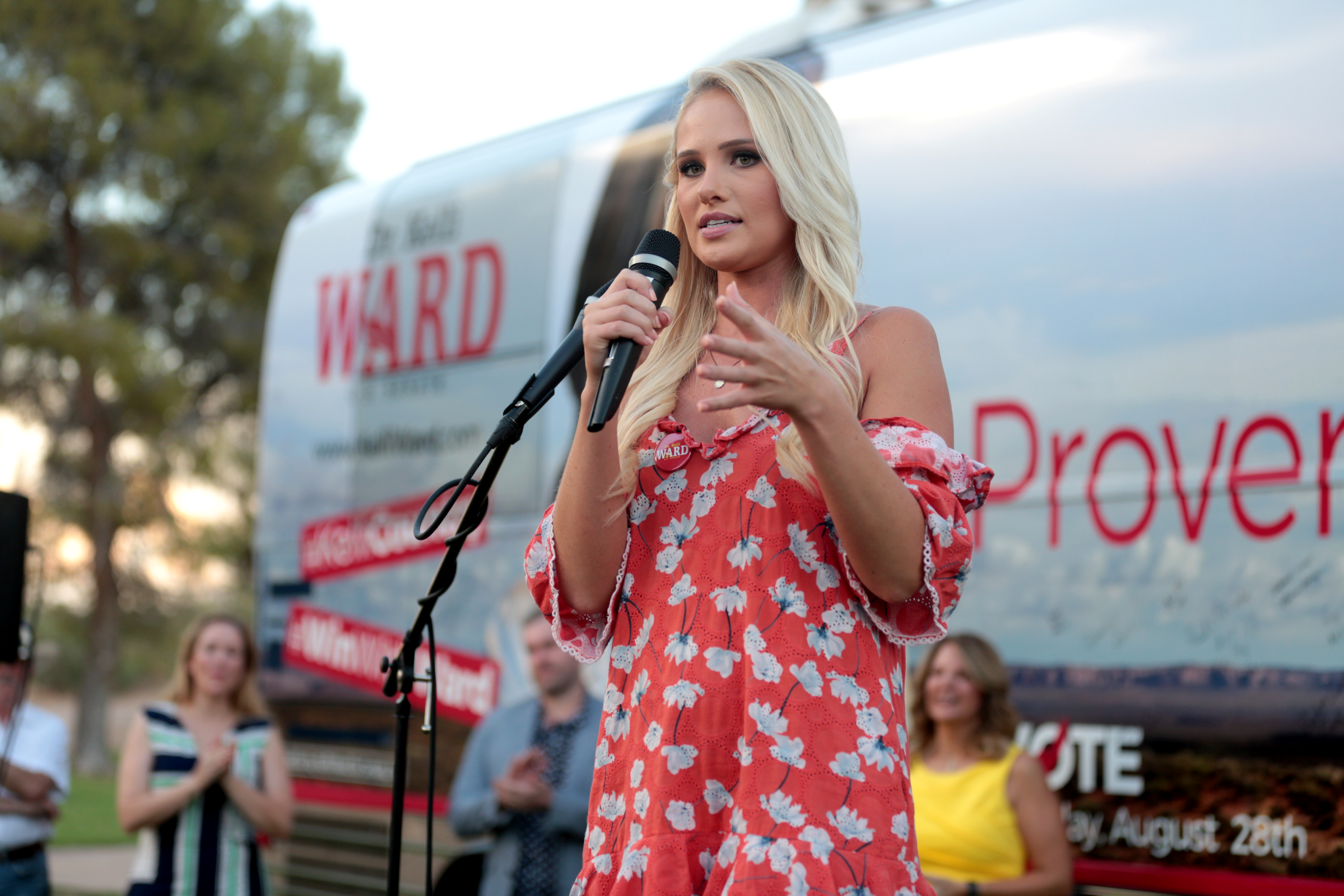
Lahren speaking at a campaign rally for U.S. Senate candidate Kelli Ward in August 2018

Hoping to find an internship in political commentary, Lahren applied to One America News Network (OANN), obtained an interview, and was instead offered the opportunity to host her own show. She moved to San Diego, California, and began working for OANN. On Point with Tomi Lahren debuted in August 2014.

In July 2015, a video of her commentary on the 2015 Chattanooga shootings garnered widespread attention. On August 19, Lahren announced that she had completed her last show with OANN. She moved to Texas and began a new show with TheBlaze in November 2015. She became known for ending her program with three-minute segments called "Final Thoughts", in which she spoke extremely quickly. These segments became widely popular on social media.

In January 2016, Lahren endorsed Marco Rubio for president in the Republican Party presidential primary. On November 30, Lahren appeared on The Daily Show with Trevor Noah for a 26-minute interview. Many critics compared her appearance to former host Jon Stewart's friendly rivalry with Bill O'Reilly.

On March 17, 2017, Lahren made a guest appearance on The View in which she said that women should have access to abortion and that she would be a hypocrite if she supported both "limited government and also government restrictions on abortion". TheBlaze's owner, Glenn Beck, who is anti-abortion, criticized Lahren for her comments and suspended her with pay, leading Lahren to file a wrongful termination suit. The suit was settled under an agreement in which Lahren kept her Facebook page but removed videos she had made with TheBlaze.

In May 2017, Lahren began working in communications at Great America Alliance, an offshoot of Great America PAC, a large pro-Donald Trump super PAC chaired by Newt Gingrich and Rudy Giuliani. Lahren described her role there as a "side gig" and said she would return to television as a commentator. In August 2017, Lahren joined Fox News as a contributor.

On September 10, 2025, Fox News announced Lahren would be named co-host of The Big Weekend Show alongside Joey Jones beginning on September 20.

== Political views ==
Lahren describes herself as a "constitutional conservative". She has said that she is a commentator, not a journalist, and that her shows are not about presenting news neutrally, but about commentary and "mak[ing] the news". Lahren has been described as an "anti-feminist who admires strong women." She has said that while she does not consider herself a feminist, she believes in women's empowerment and looks up to various women from both the political left and the political right.

In March 2017, Lahren said she was pro-abortion rights, sparking criticism from a number of anti-abortion writers. TheBlaze owner Glenn Beck, among others, noted that Lahren had previously publicly said she was anti-abortion, in addition to numerous other inconsistencies on other issues. Soon thereafter, Lahren told Playboy that she had always supported abortion rights as a matter of national law but was personally against abortion.

While in college, Lahren wrote a feature for the Las Vegas Review-Journal about a classmate who had turned to stripping to support herself.

Lahren is also in favor of same-sex marriage. In June 2020, she supported Supreme Court justice Neil Gorsuch's vote and majority opinion in the combined cases of Bostock v. Clayton County, Altitude Express Inc. v. Zarda, and R.G. & G.R. Harris Funeral Homes Inc. v. Equal Employment Opportunity Commission, ruling that businesses cannot fire LGBTQ people for their sexuality or gender identity. Lahren stated, "You can be Christian, conservative, and a proud Trump supporter and believe people should not be fired for who they love. Conservative doesn't come in one flavor, one race, one religion, one gender or one sexuality ... and I won't sit by quietly and allow certain self-righteous and self-appointed and anointed conservative thought policemen make that decree."

Some of Lahren's commentaries on race issues have been described by critics as racist or race-baiting, which she disputes. In July 2016, Lahren posted a tweet comparing the Black Lives Matter movement to the Ku Klux Klan. Tens of thousands of people signed a Change.org petition in response asking for her to be fired from TheBlaze. The petition was unsuccessful. In August 2016, she released a video criticizing NFL quarterback Colin Kaepernick, who had been protesting police brutality by kneeling during the playing of the national anthem before football games.

In August 2018, at a political rally for Kelli Ward, Lahren warned against voters electing 'RINOs' (Republicans in name only) into Congress; the term was applied to Senators John McCain and Jeff Flake. Lahren was criticized as cruel and disrespectful as McCain was in very poor health; that day he discontinued medical treatment for brain cancer, and he died the next day. Many people have criticized Lahren for her behavior including former Fox News anchor Greta Van Susteren.

In November 2018, Lahren said that the "highlight" of her Thanksgiving had been watching United States Border Patrol fire tear gas at migrants trying to illegally cross over the Mexico–United States border. In December 2018, she ran a Fox Nation segment focusing on how members of a Central American migrant caravan that had been stopped in Mexico that year were carrying diseases; she listed several unconfirmed cases of HIV/AIDS and chickenpox to support the claim.

Lahren is a strong supporter of President Trump. In a 2025 interview on her podcast with commentator Krystal Ball, she stated she had zero disagreements with the actions of him and his administration. Ball gave the example of the deportation of Kilmar Abrego Garcia to CECOT, alongside the illegal deportation and detention of other American citizens by the administration, and in response Lahren stated that she "loved that."

== Personal life ==
In June 2019, Lahren announced on Instagram that she was engaged to her boyfriend, Brandon Fricke. Their engagement was called off in 2020. In early 2021, Lahren was linked to fellow Fox broadcaster and former Major League Baseball catcher J. P. Arencibia. On September 25, 2021, Lahren confirmed that she was engaged on an episode of Justice with Judge Jeanine. They were married October 21, 2022. Lahren owns "a chihuahua mutt named Kota".

In April 2020, Lahren moved from Los Angeles to Nashville.

Lahren is an avid runner, and has a tattoo of a wheat leaf and South Dakota's state flower (the pulsatilla) on the back of her neck, as well as a tattoo of "roman numeral 11 with a semicolon", since eleven is her lucky number.

== Bibliography ==
- Lahren, Tomi (2019). Never Play Dead: How the Truth Makes You Unstoppable. Broadside Books.
