= Dana Perino =

American conservative political commentator (born 1972)

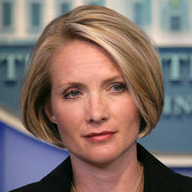
- Perino in 2007

Member of the Broadcasting Board of Governors
- In office June 30, 2010 – December 31, 2012
- Appointed by: Barack Obama
- Preceded by: Ted Kaufman
- Succeeded by: Matt Armstrong

26th White House Press Secretary
- In office September 14, 2007 – January 20, 2009
- President: George W. Bush
- Deputy: Tony Fratto
- Preceded by: Tony Snow
- Succeeded by: Robert Gibbs

White House Deputy Press Secretary
- In office January 20, 2005 – September 14, 2007
- President: George W. Bush
- Secretary: Scott McClellan; Tony Snow
- Preceded by: Scott McClellan
- Succeeded by: Tony Fratto

Personal details
- Born: Dana Marie Perino; May 9, 1972 (age 54) Evanston, Wyoming, U.S.
- Party: Republican
- Spouse: Peter McMahon (m. 1998)
- Education: Colorado State University Pueblo (BA); University of Illinois Springfield (MA)

Dana Marie Perino (born May 9, 1972) is an American political commentator and author who was the 26th White House press secretary, under President George W. Bush from September 14, 2007, to January 20, 2009. She was the second female White House press secretary, after Dee Dee Myers, who served during the Clinton administration.

Perino is a political commentator for Fox News, while also serving as a co-host of the network's talk show The Five, and was a book publishing executive at Random House. On October 2, 2017, she began hosting The Daily Briefing with Dana Perino on Fox News. In early 2021, Perino left The Daily Briefing to co-anchor America's Newsroom with Bill Hemmer.

== Early life and career ==
Born in Evanston, Wyoming, on May 9, 1972, she grew up in Denver, Colorado. Two of her paternal great-grandparents were Italian immigrants from Turin, Piedmont. She attended Ponderosa High School in Parker, a suburb southeast of Denver. Perino graduated from Colorado State University Pueblo with a bachelor's degree in mass communications and minors in both political science and Spanish. She was on the university's forensics team and worked at KTSC-TV, the campus-based Rocky Mountain PBS affiliate. She also worked at KCCY-FM on the 2 to 6 a.m. shift. Perino went on to obtain a master's degree in public affairs reporting from the University of Illinois Springfield (UIS). During her time at UIS, she also worked for WCIA, a CBS affiliate, as a daily reporter covering the Illinois Capitol.

Perino next worked in Washington, D.C., for Congressman Scott McInnis (R-CO) as a staff assistant before serving nearly four years as the press secretary for Rep. Dan Schaefer (R-CO), who then chaired the House Commerce Subcommittee on Energy and Power.

After Schaefer announced his retirement in 1998, Perino and husband Peter McMahon moved to Great Britain.

In November 2001, Perino returned to Washington, D.C., and secured a position as a spokesperson for the Department of Justice, at which she served for two years.

Perino then joined the White House staff as the associate director of communications for the White House Council on Environmental Quality (CEQ), where she provided strategic advice on message development, media relations and public outreach.

== Press secretary ==
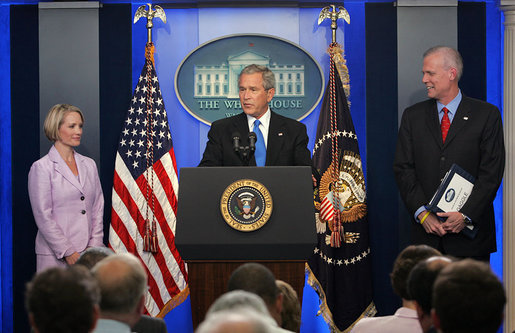
Dana Perino, George W. Bush, and Tony Snow

Perino was hired by White House chief of staff Andy Card two months after the September 11 attacks. Initially, she was associate director of communications for the White House CEQ in 2002.

Perino served as Deputy Press Secretary from 2005 to 2007. From March 27 through April 30, 2007, she was the Acting White House Press Secretary while Tony Snow underwent treatment for colon cancer.

On August 31, 2007, President George W. Bush announced Snow would be resigning his post for health reasons where Perino would become his replacement. Perino served as Assistant to the President and as White House Press Secretary from September 14, 2007, until the end of the Bush administration in January 2009.

On December 14, 2008, a TV journalist, Muntadhar al-Zaidi, threw two shoes at Bush during a Baghdad press conference. Bush successfully dodged both, but Perino's eye was injured by a microphone stand during the commotion surrounding al-Zaidi's arrest.

== Post-Bush administration career ==
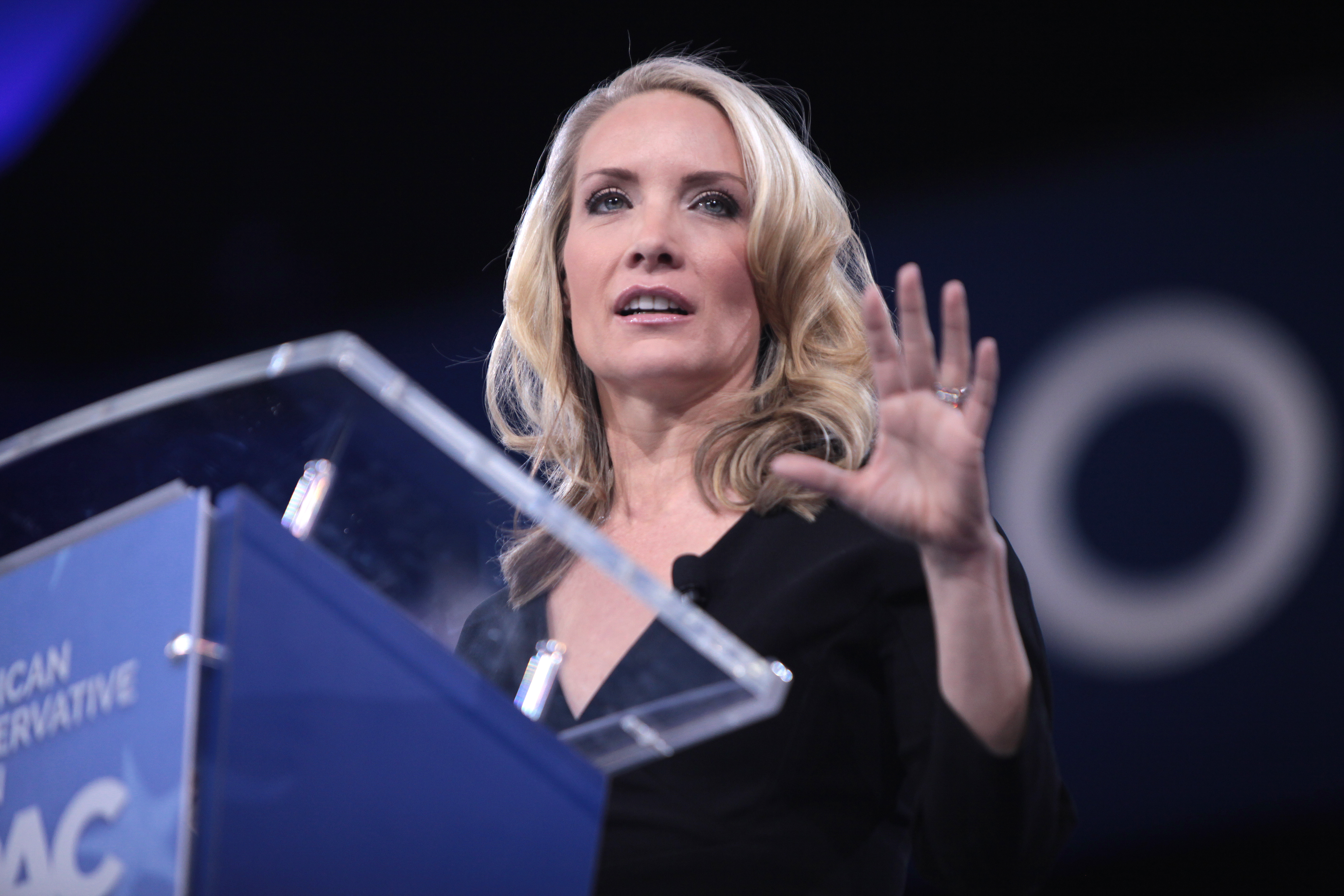
Perino speaking at the 2016 Conservative Political Action Conference in Washington, D.C.

Since leaving the White House, Perino became a political commentator on Fox News. She is a regular co-host on the talk show The Five. In November 2009, she was nominated by President Barack Obama to serve on the Broadcasting Board of Governors, an agency overseeing government-sponsored international broadcasting, and was confirmed by the Senate on June 30, 2010. In 2010, she started teaching a class in political communications part-time at George Washington University's Graduate School of Political Management. In March 2011 the Crown Publishing Group, a division of Random House, Inc., announced Perino had joined its books imprint Crown Forum as editorial director but she has since left this position.

Beginning September 18, 2016, Perino's podcast Perino & Stirewalt: I'll Tell You What, co-hosted with Chris Stirewalt, premiered as a weekly limited series on the Fox News Channel. A new show was released weekly until Stirewalt's firing from the network after the 2020 presidential election.

In 2022, she served as a guest host of Fox News' late night talk show Gutfeld!, as of 2023 she continues to serve as a regular fill in for host for Greg Gutfeld.

In August 2023, it was announced Perino would host a new podcast entitled Perino on Politics on Fox News Radio ahead of the 2024 presidential election.

On August 30, 2023, Fox News Media announced Perino would moderate the second GOP presidential primary debate on Fox Business alongside Stuart Varney and Ilia Calderón. Towards the end of the debate, she asked the candidates to "vote [one of their fellow candidates] off the island." None of the candidates was willing to take her offer with the exception of Chris Christie, who later refused to reveal whose name he wrote down after a couple of candidates began criticizing the question. The audience responded with laughter. Florida Governor Ron DeSantis dismissed the question outright. "I'm not going to do that, with all due respect, we're here, we're happy to debate, I think that that's disrespectful to my fellow competitors," he said. The other candidates nodded in agreement.

On April 21, 2026, Perino's debut novel, Purple State, was published.

== Other media appearances ==
In May 2012, Perino appeared on Jeopardy! during its "Power Players" week, facing Kareem Abdul-Jabbar and CNBC's David Faber.

== Personal life ==
Perino met her future husband, Peter McMahon, in August 1997. They were married in 1998. He is 18 years her senior.

Perino has been a resident of Bay Head, New Jersey. Perino had a Vizsla dog named Jasper who died on September 4, 2021. A few months later, she announced on the Fox News Channel that she and her husband acquired another Vizsla named Percy.

In May 2023, Perino was awarded an honorary doctorate of Humane Letters from CSU Pueblo, her alma mater.

== See also ==
- New Yorkers in journalism

== Bibliography ==
- And the Good News Is...: Lessons and Advice from the Bright Side. Twelve Books. 2015. p. 256. ISBN 978-1455584901.
- Let Me Tell You about Jasper . . .: How My Best Friend Became America's Dog. Twelve Books. 2016. p. 272. ISBN 978-1455567102.
- Everything Will Be Okay: Life Lessons for Young Women (from a Former Young Woman). Twelve Books. 2021. p. 240. ISBN 978-1538737088.

Political offices
Preceded by Tony Snow	White House Press Secretary; 2007–2009	Succeeded by Robert Gibbs
