= Saturday in America with Kayleigh McEnany =

American talk show (2025–present)

- Also known as: Saturday in America
- Genre: News program; Current affairs; Opinion-based; Talk show
- Created by: Suzanne Scott
- Presented by: Kayleigh McEnany
- No. of seasons: 1
- No. of episodes: 4

Production
- Production location: New York, New York
- Running time: 120 minutes

Original release
- Network: Fox News
- Release: September 20, 2025 – present

Saturday in America is an American television program that airs on the Fox News Channel hosted by Kayleigh McEnany, former White House Press Secretary under President Donald Trump in his first term and co-host of the daytime talk show Outnumbered. The program airs every Saturday from 10 a.m. to 12 p.m. ET live from Fox News headquarters in New York City. The first episode premiered on September 20, 2025.

== Host ==
- Kayleigh McEnany: (2025–present) McEnany, who joined Fox News as a analyst in 2021, served as White House Press Secretary from April 2020 through the end of then-President Donald Trump's first term. Previously, McEnany held the title of national spokesperson for the Republican National Committee before joining the Trump campaign as national press secretary. She got her start in politics as an intern for former Rep. Adam Putnam (R-FL) and later, in the White House Office of Media Affairs during President George W. Bush’s administration.

== History ==
McEnany joined Fox News as contributor in March 2021 and was later named a permanent co-host of the network's daytime talk show Outnumbered alongside Emily Compagno and Harris Faulkner.

Saturday in America replaced Cavuto Live which was anchored by longtime Fox News and Fox Business anchor Neil Cavuto, who departed the network after nearly 30 years in December 2024. The time slot was filled by a rotating series of hosts until McEnany was selected in September 2025.

The program's premiere featured guests from White House Press Secretary Karoline Leavitt, Speaker of the United States House of Representatives Mike Johnson, Tomi Lahren, Emily Compagno, and Andrew Kolvet, producer of The Charlie Kirk Show.

Preceded by Fox & Friends Weekend	Saturday in America with Kayleigh McEnany; 10:00 am ET – 12:00 pm ET	Succeeded by Fox News Live
