= Kayleigh McEnany =

American political spokesperson (born 1988)

- Official portrait, 2020

33rd White House Press Secretary
- In office April 7, 2020 – January 20, 2021
- President: Donald Trump
- Deputy: Hogan Gidley; Brian Morgenstern
- Preceded by: Stephanie Grisham
- Succeeded by: Jen Psaki

Personal details
- Born: Kayleigh Michelle McEnany; April 18, 1988 (age 38) Tampa, Florida, U.S.
- Party: Republican
- Spouse: Sean Gilmartin (m. 2017)
- Children: 3
- Education: Georgetown University (BS); University of Miami (attended); Harvard University (JD)
- McEnany's voice McEnany addresses the January 6 United States Capitol attack. Recorded January 7, 2021

Kayleigh Michelle McEnany (/ˈkeɪli ˈmækənɛni/; born April 18, 1988) is an American political commentator, media personality, and former political spokesperson who served as the 33rd White House press secretary during the first Trump administration from 2020 to 2021.

Early in the 2016 Republican Party presidential primaries, she was a critic of Donald Trump but over time became one of his staunchest defenders. In 2017, she was appointed national spokesperson for the Republican National Committee. She worked for the Trump 2020 presidential campaign as national press secretary from 2019 to 2020 and again as senior advisor from October 2020 to January 2021.

McEnany began her media career as a producer for Huckabee on Fox News. She later worked as a commentator on CNN. Following her time in the Trump administration, she became an on-air contributor for Fox News and serves as a co-host of Outnumbered and host of Saturday in America with Kayleigh McEnany. She is also a primary guest host for The Ingraham Angle, Jesse Watters Primetime, Hannity, The Five, and Fox & Friends.

== Early life and education ==
McEnany was born in Tampa, Florida and raised in nearby Plant City. She is the daughter of commercial roofing company owner Michael and Leanne McEnany. She also has a younger sister, Ryann McEnany. McEnany attended the Academy of the Holy Names, a private Catholic preparatory school in Tampa. After graduating, she majored in international politics at Georgetown University's School of Foreign Service in Washington, D.C., and she studied abroad at St Edmund Hall, Oxford. While at Oxford, she was taught politics by future British Labour politician Nick Thomas-Symonds. After graduating from Georgetown in 2010, McEnany spent three years as a producer on the Mike Huckabee Show.

McEnany attended the University of Miami School of Law for her first (1L) year before transferring to Harvard Law School. At the Miami School of Law, McEnany received the Bruce J. Winick Award for Excellence, a scholarship awarded to students in the top 1% of their class. She graduated from Harvard in 2016.

== Career ==
As a college student, McEnany interned for several politicians, including Tom Gallagher, Adam Putnam and George W. Bush, and later worked in the White House Office of Communications, where she wrote media briefings.

=== Media roles ===
While in law school, McEnany appeared on CNN as a paid commentator. She supported Donald Trump in the 2016 presidential election. In early 2015, before becoming a Trump supporter, McEnany was highly critical of him, declaring on CNN and Fox Business that "Donald Trump has shown himself to be a showman" and it was "unfortunate" and "inauthentic" to call him a Republican. McEnany called his comments about Mexican immigrants "racist". According to Michael Marcantonio, a fellow summer associate at a law firm, she began supporting Trump after accepting Marcantonio's advice, which he gave to her over cocktails. In an interview with the New York Times, Marcantonio recalled telling McEnany, "Donald Trump is going to be your nominee," and that if "a smart, young, blond Harvard graduate" wanted "to get on television and have a career as a political pundit, you would be wise to be an early backer."

On August 5, 2017, McEnany left her position at CNN. The following day, she hosted a 90-second webcast, Real News Update on Trump's personal Facebook page. She praised Trump throughout the segment, saying she had brought the "real news" to the American people.

Former employer Mike Huckabee has called her a "meticulous researcher" and "extraordinarily prepared." Her rapid occupational success was noted by Van Jones, who worked with her at CNN: "I'm not trying to defend the messaging, but what I hope people can acknowledge is there's very few people in either party who can accomplish what Kayleigh has accomplished in such a short time... People keep taking her lightly, and they keep regretting it."

=== Republican political strategist ===
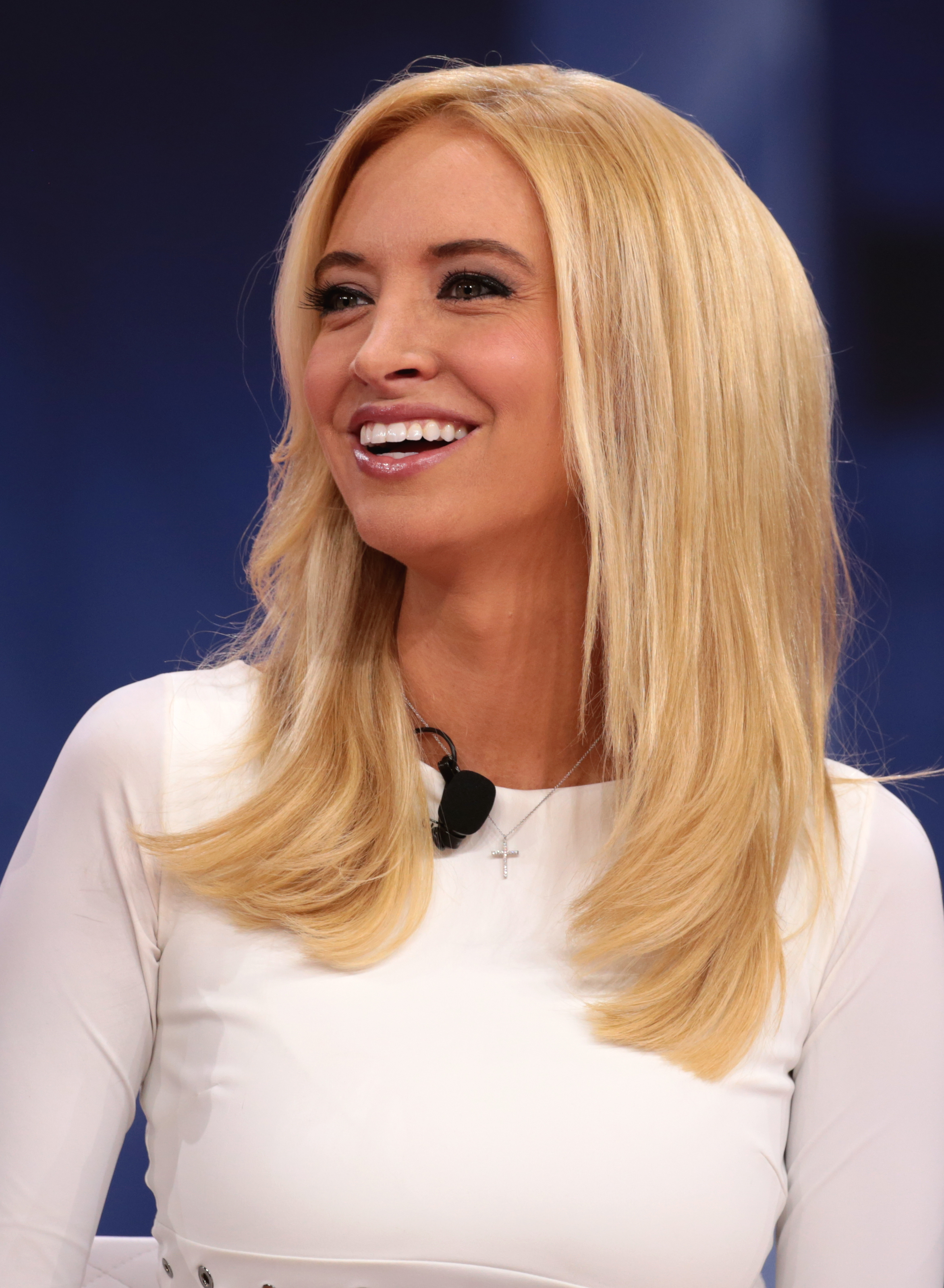
McEnany speaking at the 2018 Conservative Political Action Conference in National Harbor, Maryland

McEnany has been closely associated with the Republican Party since she was in college. She was critical of the Obama presidency, and in 2012 posted several tweets questioning Barack Obama's birthplace, echoing the "birther" conspiracy theorist movement. In 2012, McEnany tweeted about Obama's half-brother Malik Obama, who lives in Kenya: "How I Met Your Brother – Never mind, forgot he's still in that hut in Kenya".

In 2017, she said it was hypocritical to accuse President Trump of spending time playing golf when Obama had done the same thing after the 2002 beheading of Daniel Pearl. McEnany later apologized for the comment, acknowledging that Obama was a senator at the time although he did go golfing after the 2014 beheading of another journalist, James Foley, by ISIS in Syria. Obama, who was vacationing on Martha's Vineyard at the time, admitted that he should have "anticipated the optics" of golfing immediately after making a press statement on Foley's death.

On August 7, 2017, the Republican National Committee (RNC) appointed McEnany as its national spokesperson. In 2017, as RNC spokeswoman, McEnany supported Trump amid a bipartisan backlash in response to his comments about a white supremacist rally in Charlottesville, Virginia, in which he suggested that white supremacists and anti-racist counterprotesters shared blame for violence; in a tweet, McEnany wrote that the Republican Party supported Trump's "message of love and inclusiveness."

In August 2019, after The Washington Post reported that Trump had made 16,241 false or misleading statements in his first three years in office, McEnany told CNN's Chris Cuomo: "I don't believe the president has lied."

In the weeks before her appointment as White House press secretary, McEnany praised Trump's handling of the COVID-19 pandemic, saying, "This president will always put America first, he will always protect American citizens. We will not see diseases like the coronavirus come here, we will not see terrorism, and isn't that refreshing when contrasting it with the awful presidency of Barack Obama?" The disease had been present in the United States for at least a month prior to McEnany's claim that the virus would not "come here"; in December 2020 Politico named McEnany's prediction one of "the most audacious, confident and spectacularly incorrect prognostications about the year". In March 2020, McEnany said Democrats were trying "to politicize" the coronavirus and that Democrats were almost "rooting for this outcome."

In the weeks following, McEnany was criticized for her remarks. Author Grant Stern tweeted, "Kayleigh McEnany is coming to the White House with new 'alternative facts' about #coronavirus. The rest of the world calls them lies." McEnany responded that she was referring to Trump's travel ban.

=== White House press secretary (2020–2021) ===
After Mark Meadows replaced Mick Mulvaney as White House chief of staff in April 2020, Meadows's first personnel change was hiring McEnany as White House press secretary on April 7, 2020, which was officially announced the next day. Stephanie Grisham, who had served in the role and as White House communications director since June 2019, became First Lady Melania Trump's chief of staff and spokesperson.

Two months into her tenure, the Associated Press wrote of McEnany, she "has made clear from her first briefing that she's willing to defend her boss's view of himself as well as his most flagrant misstatements."

In April 2020, McEnany defended Trump's assertion that the World Health Organization had shown a "clear bias towards China" and said that the WHO put Americans at risk by "repeating inaccurate claims peddled by China during the coronavirus pandemic" and "opposing the United States' life-saving travel restrictions."

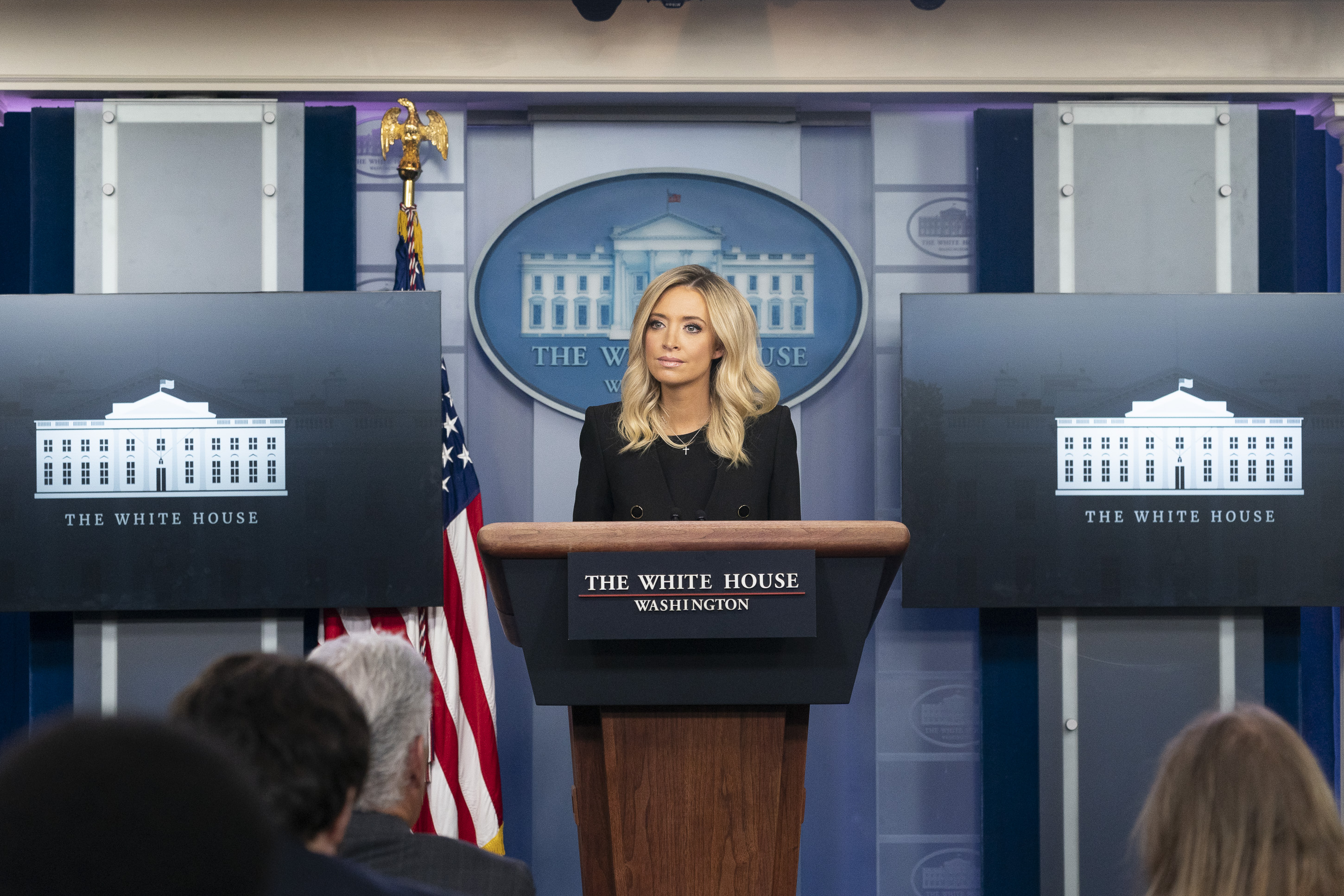
McEnany at a press conference in May 2020

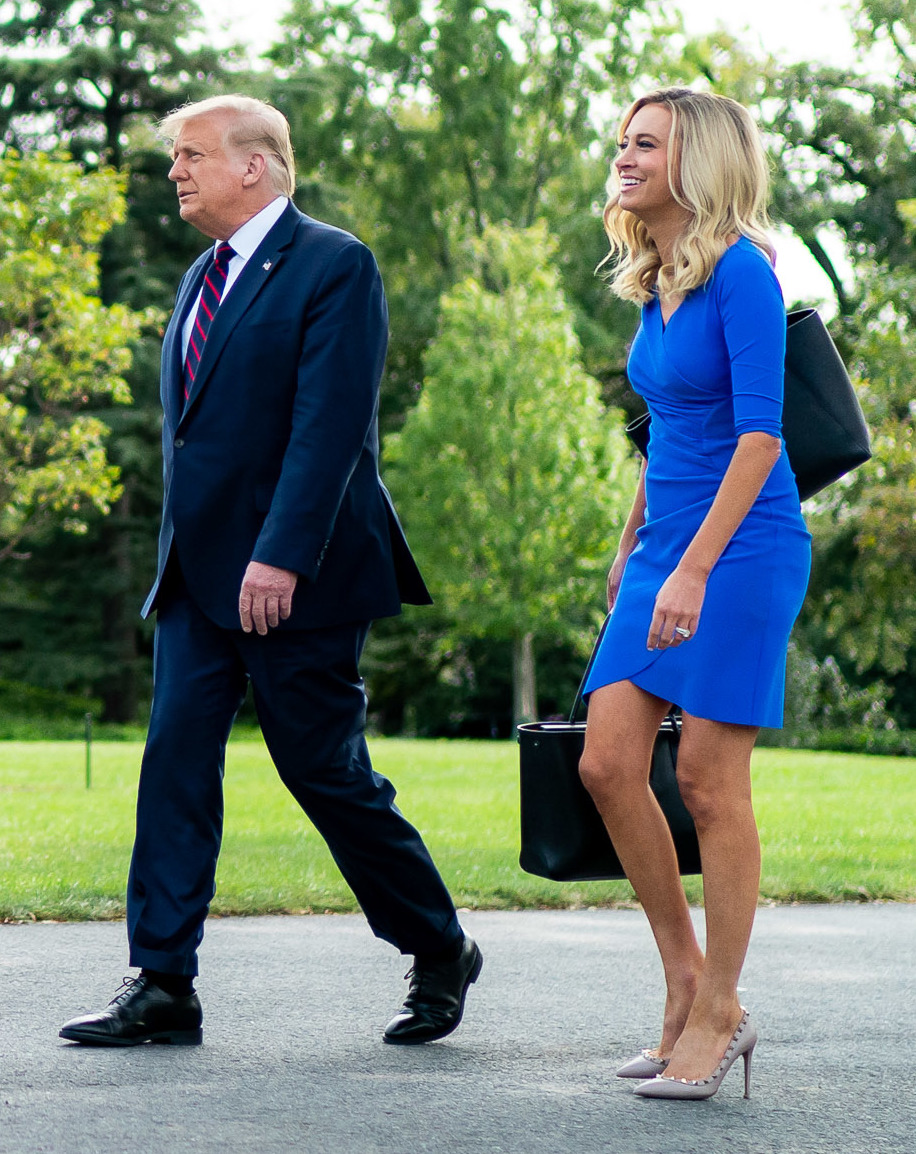
McEnany with President Donald Trump in September 2020

On May 1, 2020, as part of her first public press briefing and the first one by a White House press secretary in 417 days, McEnany was asked by an Associated Press reporter: "Will you pledge to never lie to us from that podium?" McEnany replied: "I will never lie to you. You have my word on that." On the subject of Trump's responses to the coronavirus pandemic, she claimed, "This president has always sided on the side of data". In response to allegations of Trump's sexual misconduct, McEnany said: "He has always told the truth." McEnany falsely claimed that the Mueller Report as part of the larger investigation into Russian meddling in the 2016 Presidential election had resulted in a "complete and total exoneration of President Trump," despite the report reading "Accordingly, while this report does not conclude that the President committed a crime, it also does not exonerate him."

Amid reports on May 8, 2020, that the White House was "shelving" the release of COVID-19 re-opening guidelines, McEnany said that the guidelines had not been approved by Robert Redfield, the director of the Centers for Disease Control and Prevention (CDC). Following Associated Press reports that Redfield had previously cleared the release of the guidance, Redfield addressed the issue personally, saying that the documents were still in "draft form" and had been released for "interagency review", not for public dissemination. That same week, Obama, in a private phone call with members of his former administration, described the Trump administration's response to the coronavirus crisis as "an absolute chaotic disaster". McEnany responded the next day by providing a statement to CNN claiming that, to the contrary, the "response has been unprecedented and saved American lives."

In May 2020, McEnany defended Trump's false accusation that Joe Scarborough had a person murdered, offering no evidence in support of the accusation. The same month, McEnany defended claims that Trump made about the dangers of vote by mail, repeating his inaccurate claims that vote by mail has a "high propensity for voter fraud." McEnany herself has voted by mail 11 times in 10 years.

In June 2020, she defended the Trump administration's decision to forcibly remove peaceful protestors using smoke canisters, pepper balls, riot shields, batons, officers on horseback and rubber bullets so that Trump could stage a photo op in front of St. John's Episcopal Church in Washington. She likened Trump's action to that of Winston Churchill walking the streets to survey bomb damage during World War II. When General Jim Mattis, former secretary of defense in the Trump administration, condemned Trump's action, McEnany described Mattis' comments as "little more than a self-promotional stunt to appease the DC elite."

On September 9, 2020, news agencies released the audio recordings of interviews with Trump that former Washington Post journalist Bob Woodward had conducted in February and March 2020 for his book Rage, in which Trump acknowledged to Woodward that he was intentionally downplaying the severity of the SARS-CoV-2 coronavirus, which CNN had obtained ahead of the book's September 15, 2020 release. In the wake of this development, McEnany falsely asserted, "The president never downplayed the virus." In fact, Trump repeatedly and publicly downplayed the risk of the virus and the severity of the pandemic, and in a recorded March 19, 2020 interview with Woodward said, "I wanted to always play it down. I still like playing it down, because I don't want to create a panic." In response to McEnany's comment, Washington Post media critic Erik Wemple wrote that she had sacrificed her credibility; while Joe Lockhart, who served as White House Press Secretary during the Clinton administration, wrote her answers confirmed her as a "state propagandist".

On October 5, 2020, McEnany tested positive for COVID-19. Even though she had interacted with individuals who had been diagnosed with coronavirus days prior, McEnany on several occasions spoke with the press while not wearing a mask before she ultimately tested positive for the coronavirus. Among McEnany's staff members to also test positive for COVID-19 was Chad Gilmartin, the cousin of McEnany's husband.

=== 2020 presidential election and aftermath ===
While ballots were still being counted on election day, McEnany made an early false declaration of victory for Trump. After Joe Biden won the election and Trump refused to concede, McEnany spread false claims of fraud in the 2020 election. On November 20, 2020, McEnany falsely claimed Trump was not given an "orderly transition of power". Previously in 2016, within two days of Trump's victory, his opponent Hillary Clinton conceded to Trump, while then-President Barack Obama had recognized Trump as president-elect and hosted him at the White House. Trump himself thanked Obama and his wife Michelle "for their gracious aid throughout this transition". Trump fired the leader of his transition team (Chris Christie), threw out months of transition planning, and rejected help from the Obama administration. McEnany's comment was stated while Trump himself was refusing to recognize Biden's victory as legitimate; Trump was also actively delaying the start of a transfer of power to president-elect Biden for two weeks.

Following the 2021 storming of the United States Capitol, Randall Lane, writing for Forbes, warned corporations against hiring McEnany or other people "who lied for Trump", stating that "Forbes will assume that everything your company or firm talks about is a lie. We're going to scrutinize, double-check, investigate with the same skepticism we'd approach a Trump tweet. Want to ensure the world's biggest business media brand approaches you as a potential funnel of disinformation? Then hire away."

=== Later career ===
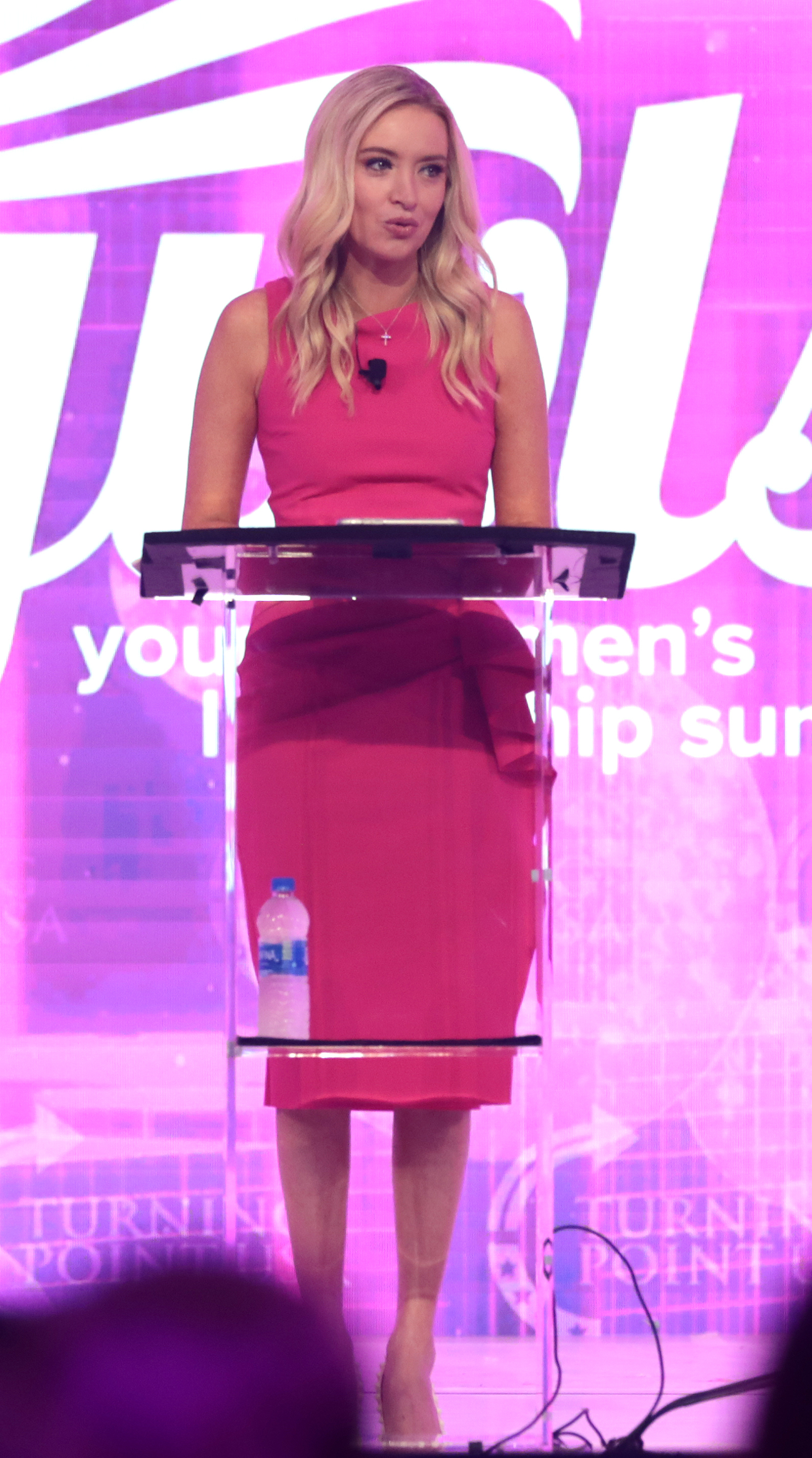
McEnany in June 2021

On March 2, 2021, McEnany joined Fox News as an on-air contributor. She was later named co-host of Outnumbered, alongside Harris Faulkner and Emily Compagno.

In May and June 2023, she served as an interim host of Fox News Tonight following the firing of Tucker Carlson. In May, after McEnany claimed that Trump's then primary rival Florida Governor Ron DeSantis was gaining on Trump in the polls for the Iowa primary, Trump responded by insulting her, calling her "Kayleigh Milktoast McEnany".

In September 2025, Fox News announced that McEnany was named host of a new Saturday morning program called Saturday in America with Kayleigh McEnany airing from 10am-12pm every Saturday morning beginning on September 20.

== Personal life ==
McEnany married Sean Gilmartin, a pitcher in Major League Baseball, in November 2017. The couple have one daughter who was born in November 2019. Due to a BRCA mutation that put her at high risk of developing breast cancer, McEnany underwent a preventive double mastectomy in 2018. In June 2022, she announced that she and her husband were expecting their second child. In December 2022, the couple welcomed a baby boy.

On March 17, 2025 McEnany announced on Outnumbered that she and Gilmartin were expecting their third child in June 2025. It was announced on June 30, 2025 that she had given birth to a baby girl.

== Books ==
- McEnany, Kayleigh (January 9, 2018). The New American Revolution: The Making of a Populist Movement. New York: Simon & Schuster. ISBN 978-1-5011-7968-6. OCLC 992563584.
- McEnany, Kayleigh (December 7, 2021). For Such a Time as This: My Faith Journey through the White House and Beyond. Simon & Schuster. ISBN 9781637582350. OCLC 1256627860.
- McEnany, Kayleigh (May 2, 2023). Serenity in the Storm: Living Through Chaos by Leaning on Christ. Liberatio Protocol. ISBN 9781637587294.

Political offices
Preceded by Stephanie Grisham	White House Press Secretary; 2020–2021	Succeeded by Jen Psaki
