= Tucker Carlson Tonight =

American talk show (2016–2023)

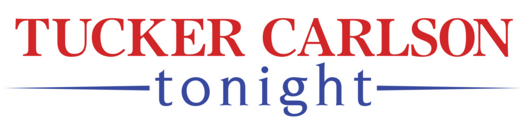
- Logo used from 2016 to 2021
- Also known as: Tucker
- Genre: Current affairs program
- Presented by: Tucker Carlson
- Country of origin: United States
- No. of seasons: 6

Production
- Production locations: Washington, D.C. (primary); Bryant Pond, Maine (primary); Florida (on location); Los Angeles, California (specials)
- Camera setup: Multi-camera
- Running time: 60 minutes (with commercials)

Original release
- Network: Fox News
- Release: November 14, 2016 – April 21, 2023

Tucker Carlson Tonight is an American conservative (Note: Attributed to multiple sources: USA Today, Reuters, CBS News, NBC News, and NPR) talk show and current affairs program hosted by political commentator Tucker Carlson. The show aired on Fox News from November 14, 2016, to April 21, 2023, replacing On the Record hosted by Greta Van Susteren. Tucker Carlson Tonight included political commentary, monologues, interviews, and analysis, sharing some similarities with On the Record. Guest hosts for the program included Will Cain, Sean Duffy, Tulsi Gabbard and Brian Kilmeade.

The show is presented in a populist format. Tucker Carlson Tonight employed a minute-by-minute viewership rating system, a change brought about by Ron Mitchell, the former senior producer for The O'Reilly Factor. During its run, the show garnered significant attention amid several controversies. In July 2020, Tucker Carlson Tonight became the highest-rated primetime program across all of cable news; its dominance in the time slot ended only after the program's abrupt cancellation.

On April 24, 2023, Fox News announced that Tucker Carlson had departed the network. The timeslot was rebranded as Fox News Tonight and filled by an interim rotation of personalities. In response, Carlson announced an intent to create a show on Twitter; Tucker on Twitter released its first episode in June. He also released his podcast, The Tucker Carlson Show, in May. On July 17, Jesse Watters Primetime took the place of Carlson's former timeslot.

== Format ==
=== Opening segment ===
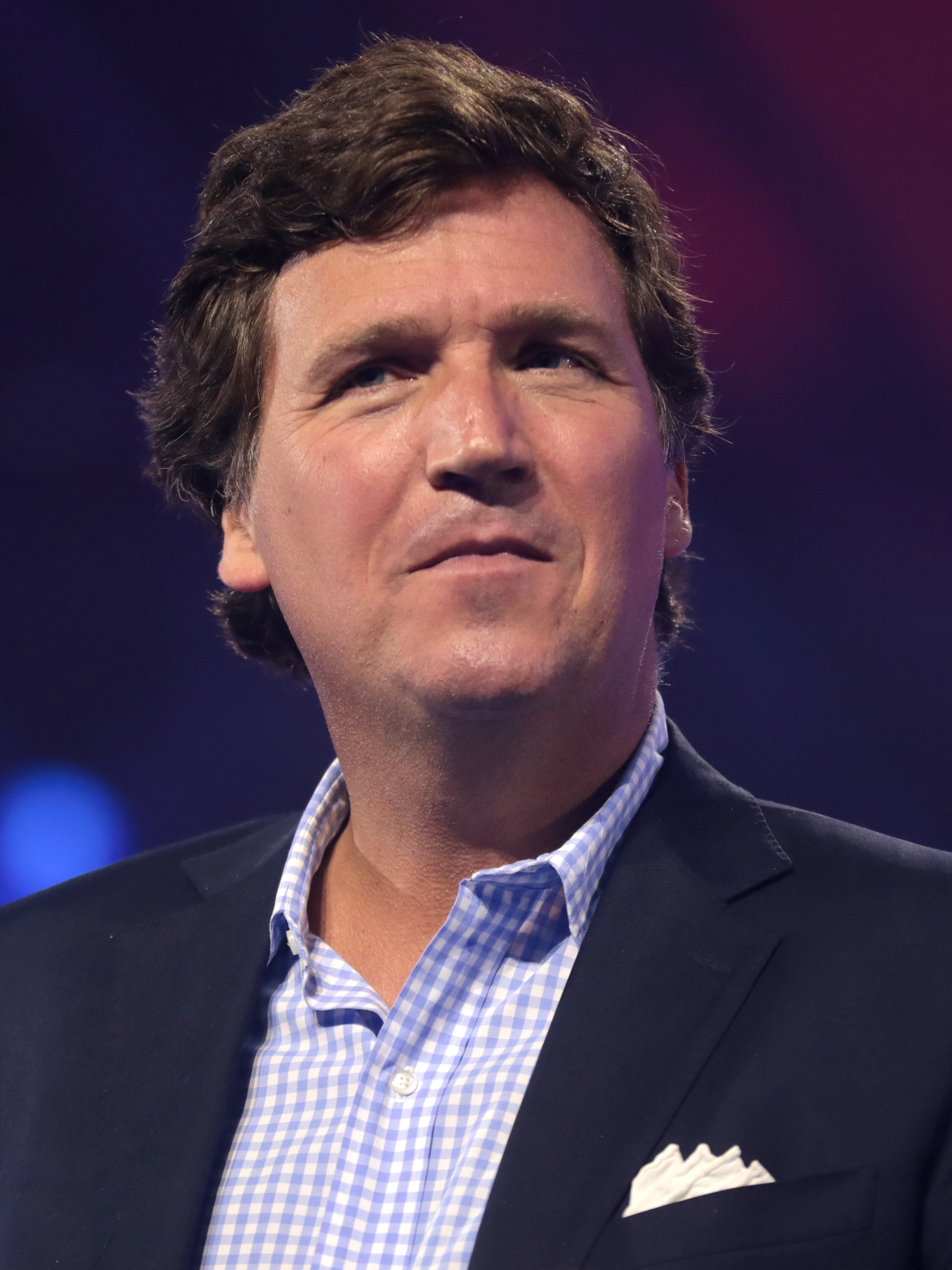
Tucker Carlson, the eponymous host of Tucker Carlson Tonight

Carlson dedicates the opening segment of Tucker Carlson Tonight to topical culture issues and economic populism. Opening segments have focused on a debunked story that Nashville mayor John Cooper concealed COVID-19 case numbers and an April 2017 poll showing a larger margin of victory for Donald Trump against Hillary Clinton while mocking the 2017 Women's March in January. During his visit to Budapest, Hungary in August 2021, Carlson opened Tucker Carlson Tonight by supporting the premiership of Hungarian prime minister Viktor Orbán. Carlson's final opening segment combined the Great Replacement conspiracy theory with—among other things—FICO scores, home appraisals, the United States Department of Housing and Urban Development, vice president Kamala Harris, and marijuana legalization, of a backdrop over the failures of a cult; the Great Replacement was also referenced in an April 2021 taping of the show. The length of these opening segments has steadily increased since 2019.

=== Current events segments ===
Carlson's monologue is followed by one or several main stories. Tucker Carlson Tonight originally focused on less consequential cultural issues, such as a new line of hijabs from Macy's or an influx of Romani refugees in California, Pennsylvania. With more executive control, executive producer Ron Mitchell implemented minute-by-minute viewership ratings from the show's previous quarter-hour viewership ratings. Tucker Carlson Tonight began shifting from lighter segments to heavier topics, and overviewed Trumpism rather than Donald Trump himself, frequently criticizing the former president for deviating from campaign promises, such as expanding the Mexico–United States barrier. In opposition to many Fox colleagues, Carlson criticized the assassination of Qasem Soleimani in January 2020 by the Trump administration.

Carlson's segments are frequently presented in a populist format, antagonistic towards several notable politicians, executives, and other figures, such as former National Institute of Allergy and Infectious Diseases director Anthony Fauci, former speaker of the House Nancy Pelosi, Hungarian-American businessman George Soros, and former Republican representative Liz Cheney. The Russian invasion of Ukraine prompted an episode in which Carlson presented Russian president Vladimir Putin as an ally through the use of rhetorical questions. Carlson extensively references the Great Replacement conspiracy theory, connecting it to the aforementioned "ruling class". During the Dominion Voting Systems v. Fox News Network lawsuit, memos by Fox News vice president Raj Shah were unveiled which showed the network announcing that the anchors of Tucker Carlson Tonight were to immediately label "any and all" policy announcements by president Joe Biden as "socialism", writing that framing such announcements as socialism from an Alexandria Ocasio-Cortez and Bernie Sanders playbook would likely "animate [Carlson]'s core audience".

=== Recurring segments ===
Tucker Carlson Tonight occasionally featured a segment sometimes entitled, "Campus Craziness", displaying professors and students at college campuses—a frequent topic on Fox News and Blake Neff's specialty at The Daily Caller. Such segments involved professors being shunned for criticizing Islam or expressing apparent hatred for white people, and—in one episode—students in Mississippi who mistook a banana peel for a hate crime. One segment, "Top This", found Carlson courting quips at video clips of outraged people, a tactic used by Bill O'Reilly on The O'Reilly Factor. Other segments included "Tucker Takes On"—in which Carlson debates a liberal counterpart and described by executives as "Twitter for television", "The Friend Zone"—promoting other Fox News colleagues or friends of Carlson, the "Final Exam"—a trivia game where two guests compete to answer questions relating to recent headlines, and "King for the Day"—a segment where Twitter users could suggest one thing they would change if they were the president.

== Studio ==
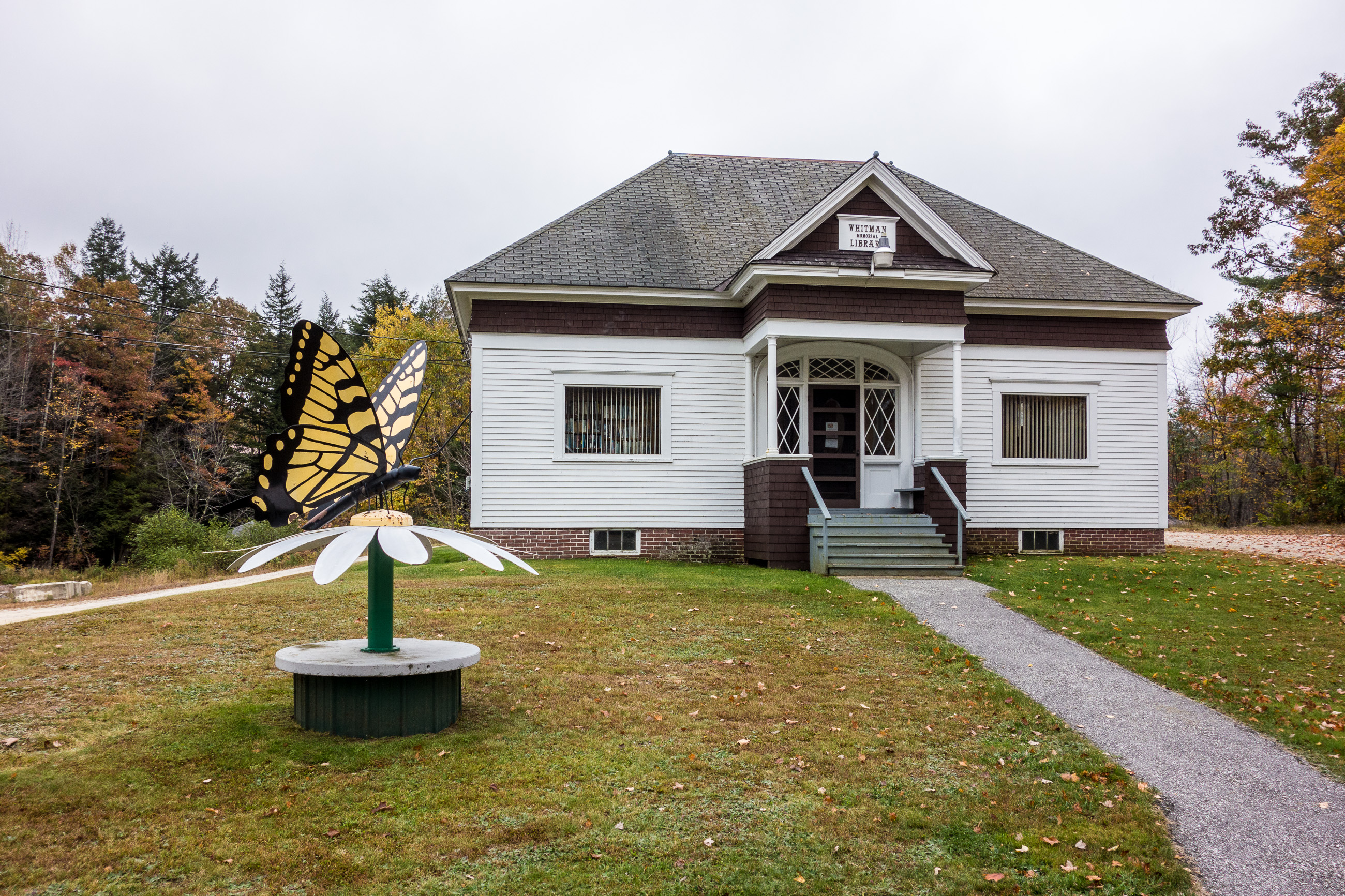
Tucker Carlson Tonight was partially filmed at a garage beside the Whitman Memorial Library in Woodstock, Maine.

Tucker Carlson Tonight was broadcast from Bryant Pond, Maine and, occasionally, Florida; in January 2017, it was reported that Tucker Carlson Tonight was broadcast from Fox News' bureau in Washington, D.C. In March 2019, the Sun Journal reported on potential plans for Carlson to use an old town garage beside the Whitman Memorial Library in Bryant Pond as a studio that could potentially host an audience. Carlson, who has spent many of his summers at Lake Christopher, sent the town a letter in December 2018 offering to purchase the garage for US$30,000. The deal was abandoned after the Sun Journal's article, but residents agreed to sell Carlson the garage regardless in November 2019. Construction began on the studio in May 2020 using US$88,000 of Carlson's own money according to documents submitted to the town.

== Production ==
Carlson began each morning by writing his monologue, telling conservative political commentator Dave Rubin on The Rubin Report that he sends his staff—comprising two dozen employees overseen by senior executive producer Justin Wells—a memo with his lead story and guests he would like to book. Tucker Carlson Tonight's producers would then scour several right-wing websites, such as Breitbart News and The Federalist. Early on in the show's production, stories would be sent to a team formed by then-CEO Roger Ailes, who suggested that Carlson's producers abstain from using sources such as the neo-Nazi forum Stormfront. Carlson's producers began progressively submitting less and less stories to Ailes' team. In March 2017, it was reported that the show's producers allegedly contacted moderators of a Tucker Carlson subreddit to solicit suggestions, which was then posted on the pro-Trump subreddit r/The_Donald.

== History ==
=== Roger Ailes' resignation (2016–2017) ===
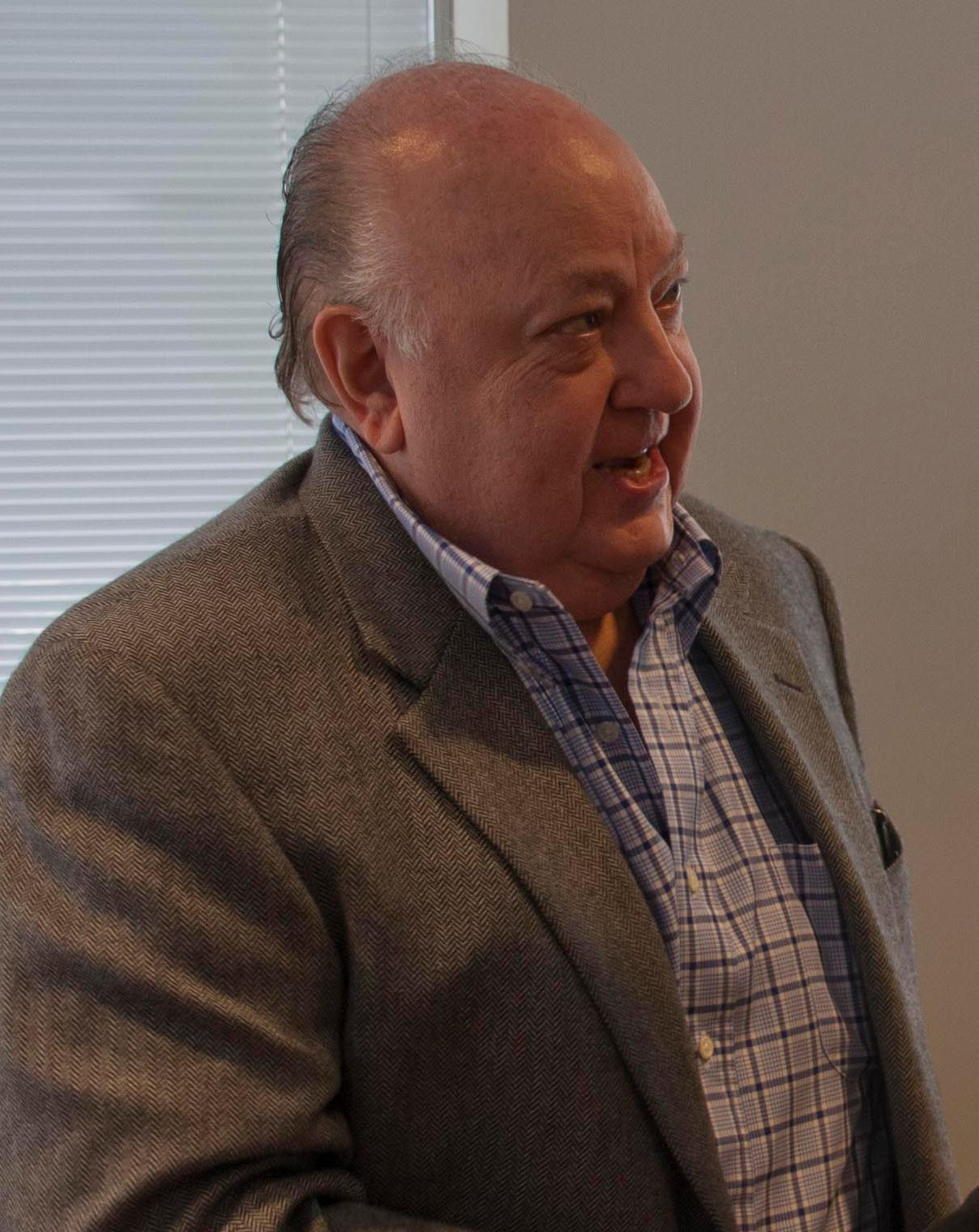
Fox News CEO Roger Ailes's resignation allowed Carlson to receive his own program.

In May 2016, amid a sexual harassment lawsuit filed by former Fox News anchor Gretchen Carlson, then-CEO Roger Ailes resigned. Ailes' resignation set the stage for Tucker Carlson, who was well-liked by the Murdochs; Tucker had been a regular on the weekend edition of Fox & Friends. In contrast, Ailes told him that Fox News was "his last chance" at network television. Greta Van Susteren's resignation allowed Tucker Carlson Tonight to occupy On the Record's time slot. The show premiered as a 7:00 p.m. ET program in Fox News's lineup on November 14, 2016. The program's premiere episode attracted 3.7 million viewers and was rated higher than previous editions of On the Record.

=== Timeslot changes and boycotts (2017–2023) ===
Following Megyn Kelly's departure from Fox News, the network announced on January 5, 2017, that Tucker Carlson Tonight would take over the 9:00 p.m. ET time slot vacated by The Kelly File beginning on January 9, 2017. Martha MacCallum was named as his replacement in the 7:00 p.m. timeslot, with her show carrying the title The First 100 Days. Tucker Carlson Tonight switched time slots once again to 9 p.m. ET when Bill O'Reilly of The O'Reilly Factor was let go following allegations of sexual misconduct. In June 2017, Ron Mitchell was named the vice president of story development at Fox News after serving as the senior producer of The O'Reilly Factor until its cancellation in April 2017.

Throughout 2018 and 2019, the show was the target of an advertiser boycott. Advertisers began leaving the show after complaints following Carlson saying that U.S. immigration made the country "poorer, dirtier and more divided." According to Fox News, the advertisers only moved their ad buys to other segments. By early 2019, it was reported the show had lost at least 26 advertisers, and by August 2019, Media Matters calculated that the show had lost more than 70 advertisers since December 2018. By late September 2019, almost 50 advertisers had released statements announcing the discontinuation of advertising on the show; according to The Guardian, "dozens more cut ties without saying anything publicly." Despite these boycotts, the average cost for a 30-second spot on Tucker Carlson Tonight nearly doubled from 2018 to 2019, according to the advertising analytics company SQAD.

In spite of advertiser boycotts, Tucker Carlson Tonight became the second-highest rated news show in all of primetime in October 2018 with 3.2 million nightly viewers, after Hannity. In April 2020, Carlson's program surpassed Hannity as the highest-rated primetime cable news show, with an average audience of 4.56 million viewers. During the second quarter of 2020, Tucker Carlson Tonight garnered an average audience of 4.33 million viewers, the largest for any program in the history of cable news. In July 2020, Tucker Carlson Tonight broke the record for highest-rated program in U.S. cable news history, garnering an average nightly audience of 4.33 million viewers. In February 2022, Mediaite reported that "in the month of October, Tucker Carlson [was] the number-one watched host among Democrats".

In June 2020, Carlson's on-air criticisms of the Black Lives Matter movement led corporations such as The Walt Disney Company, T-Mobile, Papa John's, and Poshmark to pull advertising from his program. A data firm estimated that nearly 38% of Carlson's 2020 advertising revenue had come from My Pillow at half-year. Carlson remained the most-watched cable news host, garnering 680,000 viewers among audience members 25-54. These advertisers had not entirely pulled away from Fox News, according to the television network, but only from Carlson's show. Blake Neff, a South Dakota resident who worked for Carlson's publication The Daily Caller, served as the head writer for Tucker Carlson Tonight until July 2020, when he was found to have posted racist comments on the largely unmoderated law school message board AutoAdmit under the username "CharlesXII"; the username is an apparent reference to Charles XII of Sweden, who, like Neff, abstained from sex and alcohol.

=== Cancellation (2023) ===
A couple of weeks ago, I was watching video of people fighting on the street in Washington. A group of Trump guys surrounded an Antifa kid and started pounding the living shit out of him. It was three against one, at least. Jumping a guy like that is dishonorable obviously. It's not how white men fight.

— Tucker Carlson, January 7, 2021

On April 24, 2023, Fox News announced that Carlson had "agreed to part ways" with the network. A reason was not provided for his departure, leading to speculation that it was related to either internal criticism of Fox News leadership, a March 2023 lawsuit filed against Carlson by a senior producer alleging an anti-Semitic and misogynist workplace culture among its staff, or Fox's settlement of a lawsuit by Dominion Voting Systems. The timeslot was temporarily hosted by a rotation of Fox News personalities under the title Fox News Tonight; Brian Kilmeade hosted the first two nights following Carlson's exit. A document revealed in the lawsuit following the January 6 Capitol attack, wherein Carlson stated that a group of Trump supporters attacking an antifa supporter was "not how white men fight", alarmed several Fox News executives. Carlson signaled his intent to return to television by January 2025, when his current contract with Fox News expires. Speaking to Russell Brand months later, he claimed that Fox News did not tell him the reason for his departure.

Following Carlson's departure from the network, former viewers criticized the decision to use Kilmeade as an interim host, with strong negative reactions being shared by many on social media. Criticisms ranged from Kilmeade's hosting to the decision to fire Carlson. Fox News Channel's ratings in the 8 p.m. hour fell dramatically; on April 24, 2023, while the premiere of Fox News Tonight still finished first overall with 2.6 million viewers—a 21% decrease over the average viewership of Tucker Carlson Tonight—it was beaten in the key demographic by a Bill Clinton interview special hosted by Joe Scarborough on MSNBC. Some of Newsmax TV's primetime programs also saw a notable increase in audience, boosted by one of its programs featuring an interview with Donald Trump hosted by Greg Kelly that night. On April 25, Fox's ratings fell further, being barely overtaken by MSNBC's All In with Chris Hayes. The timeslot lost approximately half of the viewers it retained as of April 26.

After his dismissal, Carlson announced an intent to produce a web series as a successor to Tucker Carlson Tonight, which would be hosted on his Twitter account; the first episode of the show, Tucker on Twitter, was released on June 6, 2023. On June 12, Axios reported that Fox News had sent a cease and desist letter to Carlson, alleging that despite the cancellation of his show, Carlson was still under an exclusive contract with the channel through the end of 2024. In May 2023, Drudge Report reported that Fox News was investigating the possibility of moving Hannity up into Carlson's former time slot, and moving Jesse Watters Primetime and Gutfeld! to the 9 p.m. and 10 p.m. hours respectively. On June 26, 2023, Fox News announced that Jesse Watters Primetime would move up into the former Tucker Carlson Tonight timeslot beginning July 17, with The Ingraham Angle moving to 7 p.m. Gutfeld! to 10 p.m., and Fox News @ Night to 11 p.m. In May 2024, Carlson launched the podcast The Tucker Carlson Show.

== Controversies ==
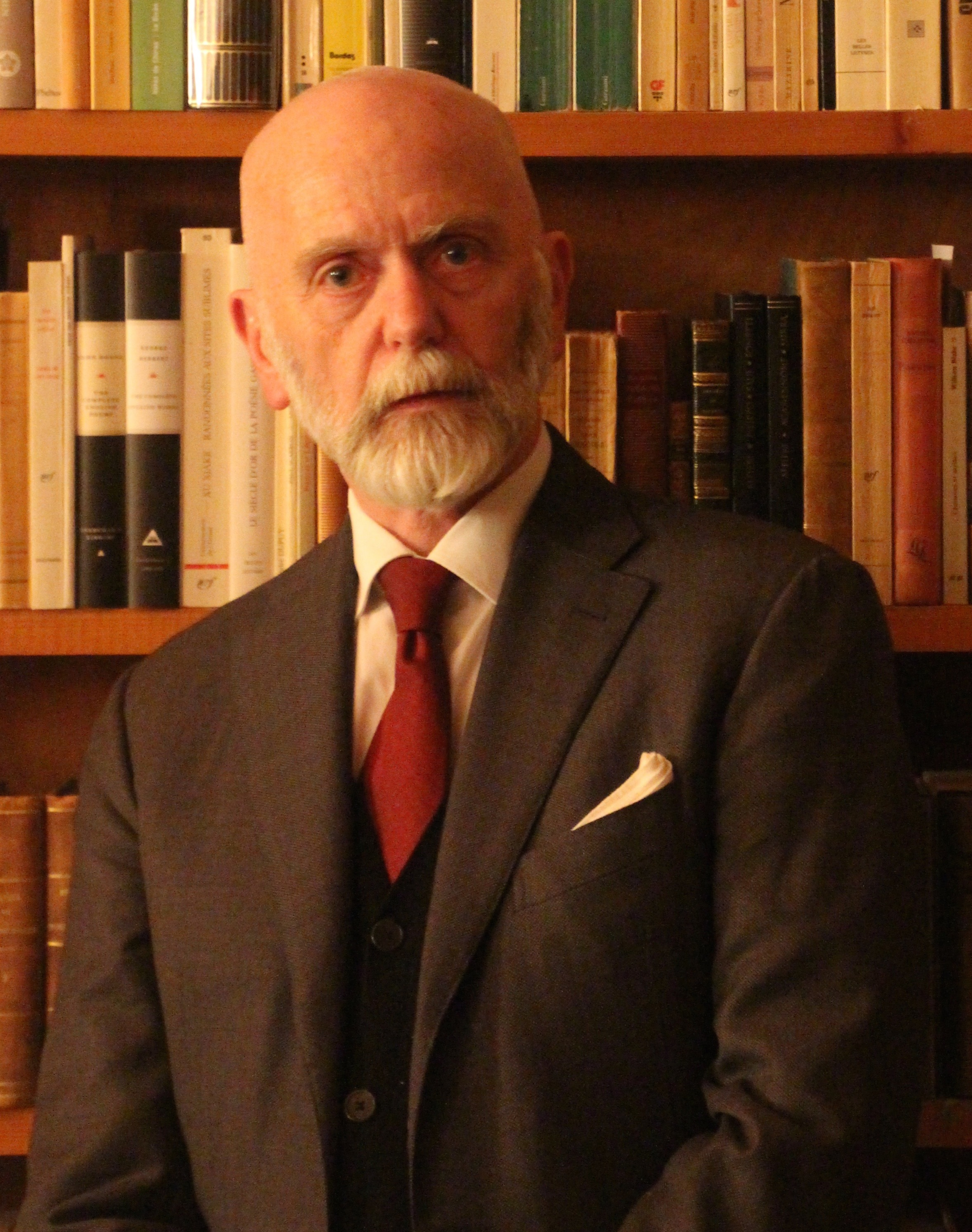
Tucker Carlson Tonight has attracted controversy for its coverage of the Great Replacement conspiracy theory, disseminated by French author Renaud Camus.

Carlson's rhetoric—particularly its connection with the Great Replacement conspiracy theory—has attracted controversy from conservative and liberal figures. In 2018, former editor-at-large of The Weekly Standard and neoconservative pundit Bill Kristol described the views Carlson expressed on his show as "ethno-nationalism of some kind." Carlson responded that Kristol "discredited himself years ago." In March 2022, during the Russian invasion of Ukraine, Los Angeles Times opinion columnist Jackie Calmes criticized Carlson for his coverage of the invasion which she considered to be biased in favor of Russian president Vladimir Putin and the Kremlin. The 2022 Buffalo shooting, whose perpetrator voiced support for the conspiracy theory, brought renewed attention to Carlson's claims.

Carlson has called the removal of Confederate monuments and memorials the "destruction of America's delicate social fabric" and Austria the next "caliphate of West Arabia". An episode in which Carlson described the murder of white farmers in South Africa—a predominantly black country—as a "white genocide" was a point of contention among Fox News employees. Despite being informed of the story's ties to the neo-Nazi message board The Daily Stormer by Fox Business president Brian Jones, Fox News vice president Tom Lowell defended the story, with Carlson's continuous coverage reaching Trump. These viewpoints were furthered by Fox News founder Rupert Murdoch's eldest son and Fox Corporation CEO Lachlan Murdoch, who showed sympathy towards Carlson.

In November 2020, the show broadcast a segment about alleged voter fraud in Georgia during the 2020 presidential election. The piece featured the story of a World War II veteran named James Blalock of Covington, Georgia, who died in 2006; Carlson claimed that Blalock voted in the election. Reporting by local news outlets in Georgia later confirmed that Blalock did not vote in the 2020 election, but that his widow had cast a legal vote under the name "Mrs. James E. Blalock, Jr", later confirmed by interviews with Blalock's widow herself. A day later, Carlson issued an on-air correction, stating that "we're always going to correct when we're wrong." Later that month, Carlson criticized unfounded claims made by former federal prosecutor Sidney Powell, who alleged that Venezuela, Cuba and unidentified communist interests had used a secret algorithm to hack into voting machines and commit electoral fraud in the 2020 election. Carlson noted that Powell's claims would be the "single greatest crime in American history", and claimed Powell became "angry and told us to stop contacting her" when he asked for evidence of such fraud. In response, James Golden, the producer of The Rush Limbaugh Show, rebuked Carlson.

In July 2020, after combat veteran and senator Tammy Duckworth called for a "national dialogue" about the removal of monuments to Founding Fathers such as George Washington—who owned slaves—Carlson received backlash after referring to her as a "moron" and, after she refused to appear on his show absent an apology, a "coward". Carlson's comment that "she was once injured while serving in the Illinois National Guard" was criticized, and he was accused of trivializing her military service; Duckworth lost both of her legs while serving in Iraq.

=== Legal issues ===
In a September 2018 episode of Tucker Carlson Tonight, Carlson coined the nickname "creepy porn lawyer" to refer to Michael Avenatti, ostensibly in reference to the latter's representing Stormy Daniels, which Avenatti objected to and reportedly found infuriating. Following on and off-air sparring between Carlson and Avenatti, the latter announced that he was investigating an alleged bar altercation involving Carlson and a patron. This culminated in the revelation that Carlson had thrown a glass of wine at a man who had insulted his daughter. A July 2019 book by author Peter D'Abrosca made reference to the incident.

In December 2019, Playboy model Karen McDougal sued Fox News after Carlson used his show to accuse her of extorting President Donald Trump. In September 2020, a federal judge dismissed the lawsuit, citing Fox News' defense that Carlson's extortion claims were opinion-based and not "statements of fact". The judge also agreed with Fox News' defense that reasonable viewers would have "skepticism" over statements Carlson makes on its show, as he often engages in exaggeration and "non-literal commentary".

In May 2023, footage surfaced online of Carlson making disparaging off-air comments about women—such as calling one "yummy" and asking a female makeup artist if women have "pillow fights" in the restroom—first published by the organization Media Matters for America. Other clips show Carlson calling a Dominion Voting Systems lawyer a "slimy little motherfucker", criticizing the streaming service Fox Nation, and discussing sex with British journalist Piers Morgan. In response, Fox News sent a cease-and-desist letter to the organization.
