= Blake Neff =

American conservative activist

- Neff in 2025
- Education: Dartmouth College
- Occupations: Conservative writer; Producer; Activist
- Political party: Republican

Blake Neff is an American conservative writer, producer, and activist. He is best known for serving as the lead writer for Tucker Carlson Tonight on Fox News and currently works as a producer and contributor for The Charlie Kirk Show.

Neff resigned from Fox News in July 2020 after CNN reported that he had for several years posted racist, sexist, and homophobic comments under a pseudonym on the online forum AutoAdmit. After several years outside the national media spotlight, Neff joined Charlie Kirk's media operation. He became a producer for The Charlie Kirk Show and appeared regularly on THOUGHTCRIME, a political discussion program associated with Kirk and Turning Point USA.

== Early life ==
Neff grew up in South Dakota and attended Lincoln High School in Sioux Falls. In 2010, while attending Dartmouth College, he served as an intern in the Washington, D.C., office of U.S. senator John Thune. A statement entered into the Congressional Record identified Neff as a student studying history at Dartmouth. At Dartmouth, Neff was involved with The Dartmouth Review, an independent conservative student newspaper. Dartmouth College identified him as an editor of the publication in a 2012 article about student involvement in the Republican presidential primary. He graduated from Dartmouth in 2013 after studying history and government.

== Career ==
=== Early career ===
After graduating from Dartmouth, Neff participated in a fellowship associated with the Collegiate Network, which led to work at The Hill. He later joined The Daily Caller, the conservative news website co-founded by Tucker Carlson. At The Daily Caller, Neff covered education and wrote satire. Carlson then recruited Neff to work on Tucker Carlson Tonight, which began airing on Fox News in 2016.

=== Tucker Carlson Tonight ===
Neff became one of Carlson's chief writers and was described as the program's top writer. In a 2020 interview with Dartmouth Alumni Magazine, Neff said that when Carlson read from a teleprompter, Neff had generally written the first draft of the material. He also said that years of working with Carlson had given him a strong sense of Carlson's views and preferred arguments. Carlson publicly praised Neff's writing, and Neff was credited for research in Carlson's 2018 book Ship of Fools.

=== Resignation from Fox News ===
In July 2020, CNN reported Neff posted anonymously on AutoAdmit under the username "CharlesXII". Neff used the account to post multiple racist and sexist remarks, derogatory comments about gay people, and posts targeting women. CNN said it identified Neff as the account's author by comparing details disclosed in the posts with publicly available information about his life and career. These details included his education at Dartmouth, his employment history, travel, and references to his work with Carlson.

Neff resigned from Fox News after CNN contacted him about the posts. Fox News chief executive Suzanne Scott and president Jay Wallace condemned the comments in an internal memorandum, describing them as racist, misogynistic, and homophobic. Carlson addressed Neff's resignation on his program, saying that the posts were wrong and that attacking people for characteristics they could not control was unacceptable. Carlson stated Neff's online writings had no connection to the content of Tucker Carlson Tonight, but criticized people who celebrated Neff's departure.

=== Work with Charlie Kirk ===
Neff returned to a role in conservative media in 2023, when he joined the production staff of The Charlie Kirk Show. Media Matters for America reported that Neff was working as a producer for the program by June of that year. Neff later became a participant on THOUGHTCRIME, a discussion program featuring Charlie Kirk, Jack Posobiec, and other conservative commentators. Kirk publicly acknowledged Neff's previous controversy and described his employment of Neff as giving him a second chance after his departure from Fox News.

Program transcripts and episode descriptions subsequently identified Neff as an editorial producer and on-air contributor. His role included research, argumentation development and talking points, and participating in discussions about politics and cultural issues. Following Kirk's murder in September 2025, Neff was among the producers and commentators who continued appearing on The Charlie Kirk Show. In 2026, The Washington Post described Neff as a producer who had appeared regularly on the program alongside executive producer Andrew Kolvet. Neff has repeatedly feuded with Candace Owens over conspiracy theories surrounding the assassination of Charlie Kirk.
