= Fox News Tonight =

American TV news program

- Genre: Current affairs program
- Presented by: Rotating Hosts; Brian Kilmeade; Lawrence Jones; Kayleigh McEnany; Will Cain; Trey Gowdy; Joey Jones; Harris Faulkner; Piers Morgan
- Country of origin: United States
- No. of seasons: 1

Production
- Production location: New York City
- Camera setup: Multi-camera
- Running time: 60 minutes (with commercials)

Original release
- Network: Fox News
- Release: September 25 – October 27, 2017
- Release: April 24 – July 14, 2023

Fox News Tonight is an American TV show that aired on the Fox News Channel from September 25, 2017 until October 27, 2017 and then from April 24, 2023 until July 14, 2023. It was the successor to Tucker Carlson Tonight after host Tucker Carlson was let go over the weekend of April 22–23, 2023. The program ended its run after it was announced that Jesse Watters Primetime would be the permanent show in the 8 p.m. slot.

== History ==
Fox News Tonight replaced Tucker Carlson Tonight in the 8pm timeslot on the Fox News Channel in 2023, premiering on April 24. Tucker Carlson had previously replaced Bill O'Reilly on The O'Reilly Factor in 2017 in the same timeslot.

At the start as an interim measure, a rotating cast of hosts will host the show, rotating each week. For the week of April 24, the host was Brian Kilmeade. Following the loss Tucker Carlson, the show lost viewership compared to its predecessor, falling 50%, but still won its timeslot in its first week, as compared to competing news programming on competitor news networks CNN, Newsmax, OAN; closely edging out MSNBC in the ratings.

In June 2023, Fox News Channel announced Jesse Watters Primetime would be permanent in the 8 p.m. EST hour effective July 17.

== Hosts ==
The following Fox News personalities served as weekly interim hosts of the program.

- Brian Kilmeade: (April 24–April 28, 2023; June 12–June 16, 2023) co-host of Fox & Friends, host of One Nation with Brian Kilmeade.
- Lawrence Jones: (May 1–May 5, 2023; June 26–June 30, 2023) host of Lawrence Jones Cross Country
- Kayleigh McEnany: (May 8–May 12, 2023; June 19–June 23, 2023) co-host of Outnumbered, former White House Press Secretary in the Trump Administration.
- Will Cain: (May 15–May 19, 2023; July 3–July 7, 2023) co-host of Fox & Friends Weekend
- Trey Gowdy: (May 22–May 26, 2023) host of Sunday Night in America w/ Trey Gowdy, Former South Carolina Congressman
- Joey Jones: (May 30–June 2, 2023) Fox News Contributor, Retired Marine Corps Bomb Technician
- Harris Faulkner: (June 5–June 9, 2023) Host of The Faulkner Focus and co-host of Outnumbered
- Piers Morgan: (July 10–July 14, 2023) host of Piers Morgan Uncensored on TalkTV and Fox Nation

== See also ==
- CNN Tonight - a similar news analysis show and the successor to Cuomo Prime Time after Chris Cuomo was fired from CNN.

Fox News Channel primetime schedule
Preceded by Jesse Watters Primetime as 7:00 pm – 8:00 pm	Fox News Tonight; 8:00 pm – 9:00 pm 1:00 am – 2:00 am (replay)	Succeeded by Hannity as 9:00 pm – 10:00 pm
Fox News Channel primetime 8:00 pm – 9:00 pm timeslot
Preceded by Tucker Carlson Tonight as 2017 – 2023	Fox News Tonight	Incumbent
