= Emily Compagno =

American television host (born 1979)

- Born: November 9, 1979 (age 46); Oakland, California, U.S.
- Education: University of Washington (BA); University of San Francisco School of Law (JD)
- Occupations: Television reporter, legal analyst
- Employer: Fox Corporation
- Political party: Republican

Emily Rose Compagno (born November 9, 1979) is a legal analyst and American television host who co-hosts the early evening news and talk show The Five on Fox News. She frequently appears on the late-night show Gutfeld! and hosts The FOX True Crime Podcast w/ Emily Compagno on Fox News Radio. On August 24, 2026, it was announced that, effective September 8, she would be joining The Five as a full-time host (she had previously been a recurring host).

== Early life and education ==
Compagno was born in Naval Hospital Oakland, California, where her father was a Commander in the U.S. Navy and a physician. She was raised in El Cerrito, California with her two sisters, Natalie and Julietta, by her parents Katherine (née Bertsch, of English, Bohemian, and German descent) and John Compagno, of Italian descent from Sicily.

She graduated with a B.A. in political science from the University of Washington, where she was a U.S. Air Force ROTC cadet for two years. She graduated with a J.D. from the University of San Francisco School of Law in 2006, where she was president of the Federalist Society and articles editor of the Intellectual Property Bulletin.

=== Family ===
Compagno's father served as a Commander in the U.S. Navy Medical Service Corps, and two uncles served in the U.S. Army. Her grandfather, great-grandfather, great-great-aunt, and many other relatives served in various branches of the military during World War I, World War II, and other conflicts, with deployments around the world. Her great-great-uncle, PFC Joseph Lorenz, died in World War I and lies buried in Suresnes, France, where his sister, Lt. Luella Lorenz, visited during her deployment in World War II with the U.S. Army Nursing Corps. Compagno's great-great-grandmother Rosa also visited the grave of PFC Lorenz as part of the Gold Star Mothers Pilgrimage.

== Career ==
After passing the California bar, she worked as a criminal defense attorney in San Francisco while also serving as captain of the Oakland Raiders cheerleading squad, the Raiderettes. The NFL selected her as an ambassador and she promoted the NFL brand in Beijing and Shanghai, and was one of five NFL cheerleaders selected by the United Service Organizations to visit U.S. troops stationed in Iraq and Kuwait.

She then passed the Washington bar.

In 2018, Compagno accepted a position at Fox News as a contributor and legal analyst. She served as a semi-regular co-host of the weekday talk show The Five and appears on other FNC programs, such as Gutfeld!, offering opinions or legal analysis on the news of the day. On March 9, 2020, Crimes That Changed America, a show on Fox Nation hosted by Compagno, debuted its first season.

Compagno was named a co-host of Outnumbered in January 2021, where she joined Harris Faulkner and Kayleigh McEnany. In February 2023, Fox News announced that Compagno would host The FOX True Crime Podcast on Fox News Radio.

Compagno is the host of the Under His Wings special, Hero Dogs, Crimes That Changed America, Weapons of War, and American Vampires on Fox Nation. She also hosted the Fox All-American New Year from Times Square in 2021 and 2022 and co-hosted the Army 250 Parade in 2025 with Lawrence B. Jones.

On August 24, 2026, Fox News announced Compagno would join The Five as a permanent co-host beginning on September 8.

== Personal life ==
Compagno lives in New York City. She is active with nonprofits dedicated to U.S. veterans, law enforcement, and K9 causes.

Compagno is Roman Catholic.
