= Sentinel (publisher) =

American conservative publishing house within Penguin Group

- Parent company: Penguin Group
- Founded: 2003
- Founder: Adrian Zackheim
- Country of origin: United States
- Headquarters location: New York City
- Publication types: Books
- Official website: Sentinel at Penguin.com

Sentinel is a dedicated conservative imprint within publisher Penguin Group (USA) which was established in 2003. It publishes a wide variety of right-of-center books on subjects like politics, history, public policy, culture, religion and international relations. Its most notable books include Donald Rumsfeld’s memoir, Known and Unknown, Mike Huckabee’s Do the Right Thing, A Simple Christmas, and A Simple Government, and A Patriot’s History of the United States by Larry Schweikart.

Founder, president, and publisher Adrian Zackheim joined Penguin Group in September 2001 to launch Portfolio, the company's business book imprint. He took on the additional role of founder and publisher of Sentinel in April 2003. He has a long track record of publishing books by notable conservatives, including Margaret Thatcher, Newt Gingrich, and Bob Dole. Before coming to Penguin Group, he was the associate publisher and editor-in-chief of HarperInformation (a division of HarperCollins) and has held various editorial positions at William Morrow, Doubleday, and St. Martin's Press.

== Books ==
- Known and Unknown by Donald Rumsfeld
- George Washington’s Secret Six by Brian Kilmeade and Don Yaeger
- A Simple Government by Mike Huckabee
- A Simple Christmas by Mike Huckabee
- Do the Right Thing by Mike Huckabee
- A Patriot’s History of the United States by Larry Schweikart
- The Secret Knowledge by David Mamet
- Keeping the Republic by Mitch Daniels
- Can’t Is Not an Option by Nikki Haley
- The Benedict Option by Rod Dreher
- In Trump We Trust : E Pluribus Awesome by Ann Coulter
- An American Son by Marco Rubio
- The Tyranny of Clichés by Jonah Goldberg
- Our Lost Constitution by Mike Lee
- Sam Houston and the Alamo Avengers: The Texas Victory That Changed American History by Brian Kilmeade
- Live Not by Lies by Rod Dreher

== See also ==
- Regnery, the publisher that influenced the creation of conservative non-fiction imprints at the Big Five
- Crown Forum, a sister imprint of Sentinel in the Crown Publishing Group, a subsidiary of Penguin Random House
- Broadside Books, the competing imprint of HarperCollins
- Center Street, the competing imprint of Hachette Book Group
- Threshold Editions, the competing imprint of Simon & Schuster
