= Adrian Zackheim =

American publisher

- Known for: Founder of Sentinel and Portfolio

Adrian Zackheim is the founder and publisher of Portfolio, a business book imprint, and Sentinel, a conservative political imprint, both divisions of Penguin Books.

== Career ==
Zackheim's early editorial career included positions at HarperCollins, William Morrow, Doubleday, and St. Martin's Press.

Zackheim worked for HarperCollins from 1994 to 2001 before joining Penguin Group in September 2001. At Penguin Group, he founded two book imprints: Portfolio, a business book imprint, in 2001, and Sentinel, a conservative political imprint, in April 2003. At Portfolio, Zackheim has published bestselling books, such as Purple Cow: Transform Your Business by Being Remarkable by Seth Godin, Start With Why by Simon Sinek, and The Smartest Guys in the Room by Bethany McLean and Peter Elkind.

Sentinel has published such books as George Washington’s Secret Six by Brian Kilmeade and Don Yaeger, and Do the Right Thing and A Simple Christmas by Mike Huckabee.

Zackheim is also publisher of Sentinel, a conservative imprint within Penguin. There, he has published George Washington’s Secret Six by Brian Kilmeade and Don Yaeger; and Do the Right Thing and A Simple Christmas by Mike Huckabee.

In 2018, in partnership with Simon Sinek, he co-founded The Optimism Press.

== Publications ==
Zackheim, A., & Zackheim, S. P. (2001). Getting your book published for dummies. IDG Books Worldwide.

== Personal life ==
Zackheim married Elizabeth Lunney in 2013. He has two sons from a previous marriage.

== Other works ==
He has edited many bestsellers including Good to Great by James C. Collins, The Dilbert Principle by Scott Adams, and The HP Way by David Packard.
