= Will Cain =

American television host and conservative political analyst (born 1975)

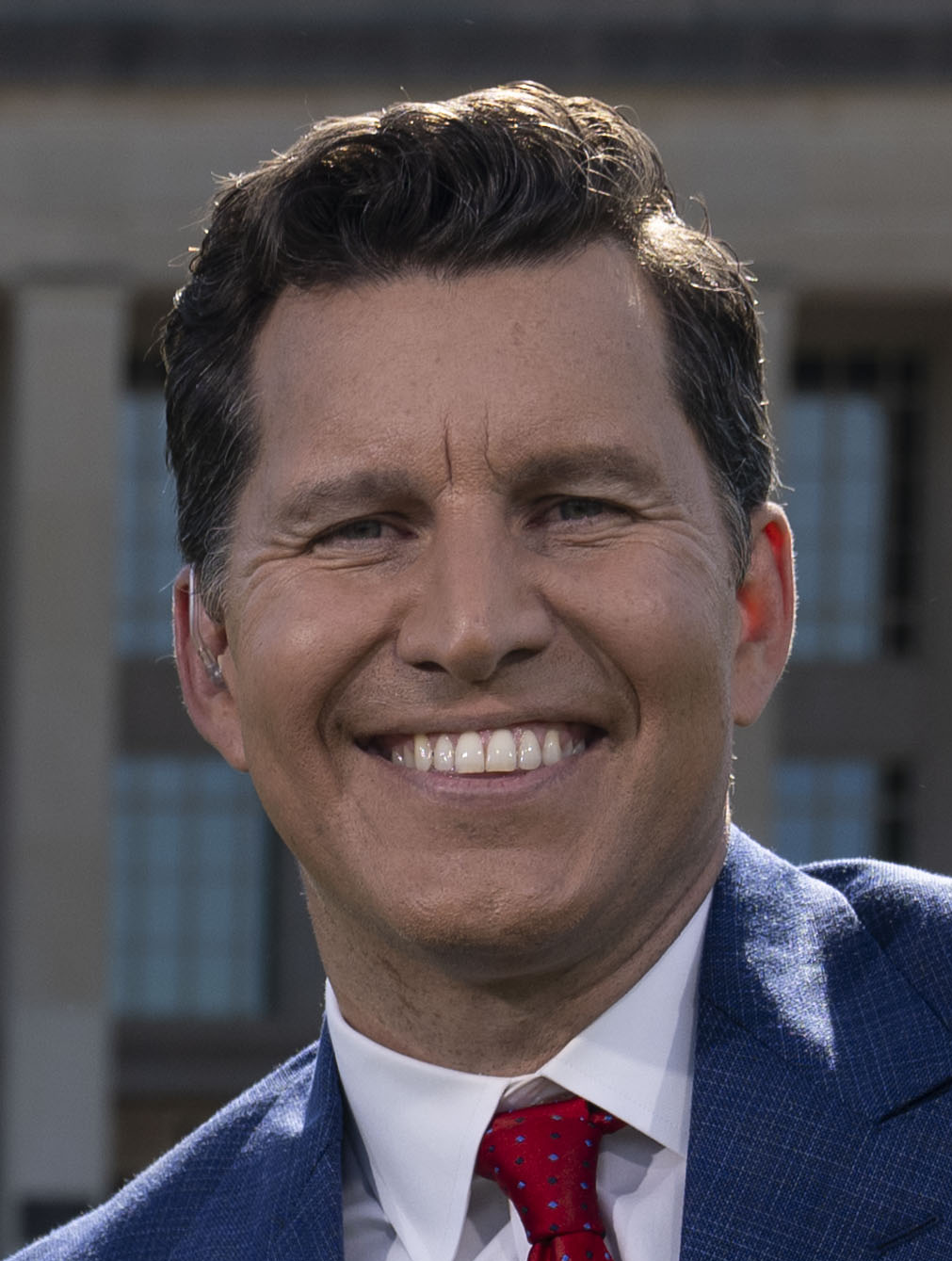
- Cain in 2025
- Born: Charles Williams Cain; March 28, 1975 (age 51); Sherman, Texas, U.S.
- Education: Pepperdine University (BA); University of Texas School of Law (JD)
- Occupations: Columnist; political analyst; television host; sports commentator
- Known for: The Will Cain Show on ESPN Radio and Fox News, co-host of Fox & Friends Weekend.
- Spouse: Kathleen Cain
- Children: 2

Charles Williams Cain (born March 28, 1975) is an American columnist, conservative political analyst, and sports commentator. He hosts The Will Cain Show weekdays at 4 p.m. on the Fox News Channel. Previously, Cain had been a co-host of Fox & Friends Weekend. Cain was a contributor for ESPN, joining the network in March 2015, working with the features unit and E:60 and appearing on First Take. He was the host of The Will Cain Show on ESPN Radio, which ran from January 2018 to June 2020. He has also been a contributor for Blaze Media and CNN, appearing frequently on Soledad O'Brien's morning program Starting Point.

== Early life and education ==
Cain was born and raised in Sherman, Texas. Attending Pepperdine University, Cain played one year on the water polo team and graduated cum laude with a bachelor's degree in telecommunications in 1997. On the Pepperdine water polo team, Cain was a walk-on who scored his only goal in 1996, in a game against UC Santa Barbara. Cain said of the experience in 2010, "Pepperdine water polo was extremely accommodating in its development of a walk-on such as me, and that's something positively unique about this program. I almost went to USC, and I'm sure that if I did have a water polo career there it would have been much shorter." In 2000, Cain completed his J.D. degree at the University of Texas School of Law. After law school, Cain moved to a ranch in Montana, where he worked as a ranch hand while trying to write a book.

== Media career ==
Following the death of his father in 2001, Cain returned to the Dallas area to help care for his younger brother. While in Texas, Cain bought two community newspapers and started others before selling them to Stephens Media, publisher of the Las Vegas Review-Journal. Around 2006, Cain founded Quince Media, which published a magazine, website, and expos about quinceañeras.

Cain previously worked as a fill-in host for CNN's In the Arena, where he co-hosted the program with E. D. Hill from February 28, 2011, to August 5, 2011.

=== 2015–2020: ESPN ===
Cain began working at ESPN in 2015 as a radio personality, hosting the program Will and Kate with Kate Fagan and serving as a fill-in for other ESPN Radio anchors. He was a frequent contributor to Outside the Lines and eventually became a fill-in host and frequent guest on First Take. Cain then was named co-host of The Ryen Russillo Show but Russillo soon left the show. Cain began hosting his own show, The Will Cain Show, on ESPN Radio in 2018. The Washington Post observed about Cain's ESPN presence in 2018: "Cain's growing profile comes amid consistent charges of liberal bias at ESPN for its coverage of social and political issues in sports." By 2018, Michael McCarthy of Sporting News argued that Cain "provides a valuable balance to ESPN" and noted he had become a “virtual third debate partner” with Stephen A. Smith, Max Kellerman and Molly Qerim on First Take. Cain continued to appear sporadically on First Take until his final appearance on June 24, 2020, while his final episode of The Will Cain Show aired two days later.

=== 2020–present: Fox News ===
In 2020, Cain left ESPN to move to Fox News as co-host of Fox & Friends Weekend (along with Jedediah Bila and Pete Hegseth). His first appearance on Fox & Friends Weekend was in August 2020. On April 5, 2021, Cain launched The Will Cain Podcast, combining his commentary in news, politics, and sports. In addition to hosting Fox & Friends Weekend, Cain serves as a regular fill-in host on programs such as The Five and Jesse Watters Primetime.

In May 2023, Cain served as an interim host of Fox News Tonight following the firing of Tucker Carlson.

On January 13, 2025, Fox News announced that he would become the permanent host of the network's 4 p.m. hour following the departure of long-time anchor Neil Cavuto. Cain ended his run on Fox & Friends Weekend on January 18 and The Will Cain Show debuted on January 21, 2025. On September 10, 2025, Cain was tasked with reporting the confirmation of Charlie Kirk's death following his assassination at Utah Valley University. Cain had hosted Kirk's final television interview on his show the previous day.

== Political commentary ==
Cain was one of ESPN's most conservative voices, although his ESPN show focused mostly on sports. Cain told the Washington Post in 2018, "Has being conservative helped me since I've been here? Of course. ESPN doesn't have a voice like mine." Cain had been critical of Donald Trump; in 2011, while he was at CNN, Cain wrote an op-ed that criticized Trump, Sarah Palin, and populism from a conservative perspective. On a January 2017 episode of First Take, Cain said that he did not vote for Trump in the 2016 election, which he later reiterated in a 2020 interview discussing his move from ESPN to Fox News.

In January 2022, Cain criticized the first year of Joe Biden's presidency on his podcast, calling Biden "the worst president of my lifetime." By 2024, Cain had shifted to a much more supportive stance on Trump, explaining to former ESPN co-host Stephen A. Smith that he believed Trump's first term policies were effective and calling the then-former president "really, really likable." By the end of Biden's presidency and just before the start of Trump's second term, Cain was described by The Daily Beast as a "MAGA convert" who was "much less likely to be critical of the president-elect" than the outgoing Neil Cavuto, whom Cain was replacing in Fox News' 4 p.m. timeslot.

== Personal life ==
Cain met his wife, Kathleen, in college. The couple has two children, Charlie and West.
