= Tarnished Heisman =

2007 book by Don Yaeger

Tarnished Heisman: Did Reggie Bush Turn His Final College Season into a Six-Figure Job?
- Author: Don Yaeger
- Language: English
- Genre: Sports
- Publication date: January 2008
- Publication place: United States
- ISBN: 1-4165-7756-4
- OCLC: 178064686
- Dewey Decimal: 796.332092 22
- LC Class: GV939 .B875 2008

Tarnished Heisman: Did Reggie Bush Turn His Final College Season into a Six-Figure Job? is a book written by Don Yaeger. The book details the alleged payments to former USC Trojans player and former NFL player Reggie Bush while still a student in college. The book was released on January 15, 2007.
