= Don Yaeger =

American author

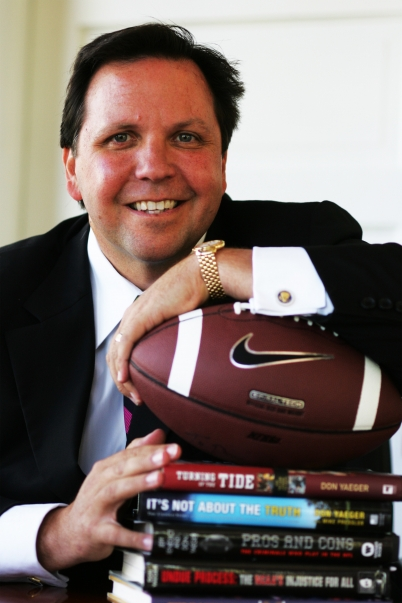
- Don Yaeger
- Born: December 24, 1962; Hilo, Hawaii, U.S.
- Occupation: Author
- Writing career
- Pen name: Don Yaeger
- Genres: non-fiction, sports, history
- Notable works: Thomas Jefferson and the Tripoli Pirates: The Forgotten War That Changed American History; Never Die Easy: The Autobiography of Walter Payton
- Website: donyaeger.com

Don Yaeger (born December 24, 1962) is an American author and public speaker. He has authored and co-authored 30 books.

Yaeger graduated from Ball State University in 1984. He worked as a reporter for the San Antonio Light from 1984 to 1985, as a reporter and Capitol Bureau Chief for the Dallas Morning News from 1986 to 1990, and as writer and Associate Editor for Sports Illustrated from 1996 to 2008. He resides in Tallahassee, Florida with his wife and two children.

== Publications ==
1. Under the Tarnished Dome: How Notre Dame Betrayed its Ideals for Football Glory (Simon & Schuster, 1993, with Douglas S Looney, ISBN 0671869507)
2. Never Die Easy: The Autobiography of Walter Payton (Villard, 2000, with Walter Payton, ISBN 0679463313)
3. Ya Gotta Believe: My Roller-Coaster Life As a Screwball Pitcher and Part-Time Father, and My Hope Filled Fight Against Brain Cancer (New American Library, 2004, with Tug McGraw, ISBN 0451212584)
4. It's Not About the Truth: The Untold Story of the Duke Lacrosse Scandal and the Lives it Shattered (2007)
5. I Beat the Odds: From Homelessness, to the Blind Side, and Beyond (Gotham Books, 2011, with Michael Oher, ISBN 1592406122)
6. Play Like You Mean it: Passion, Laughs, and Leadership in the World's Most Beautiful Game (with Rex Ryan, 2011, ISBN 9780385534444)
7. Nothing to Lose, Everything to Gain: How I Went From Gang Member to Multimillionaire Entrepreneur (Portfolio/Penguin, 2011, with Ryan Blair, ISBN 9781591844037)
8. George Washington's Secret Six: The Spy Ring That Saved the American Revolution (Sentinel, 2013, with Brian Kilmeade, ISBN 9781595231031)
9. Thomas Jefferson and the Tripoli Pirates: The Forgotten War That Changed American History (Sentinel, 2015, with Brian Kilmeade, ISBN 1591848067)
10. Tarnished Heisman: Did Reggie Bush Turn His Final College Season into a Six-Figure Job? (2008)
11. A Game Plan for Life: The Power of Mentoring (Bloomsbury, 2009, with John Wooden)
12. Great Teams: 16 Things High Performing Organizations Do Differently
13. Greatness : The 16 Characteristics of True Champions
14. 1% Better
15. Best Seat in the House: 18 Golden Lessons from a Father to His Son
16. Teammate: My Journey in Baseball and a World Series for the Ages (Hachette Books, 2017, with David Ross)
17. Andrew Jackson and the Miracle of New Orleans: The Battle That Shaped America's Destiny (Sentinel, 2017, with Brian Kilmeade)
18. You Are Worth It: Building a Life Worth Fighting For (with Kyle Carpenter, 2019)
19. Banana Ball with Jesse Cole (Dutton, May 16, 2023, ASIN: B0B9WPBY5K)
20. Elevate and Dominate: 21 Ways to Win On and Off the Field (Gallery Books, 2024, with Deion Sanders)
21. Born Lucky: A Dedicated Father, A Grateful Son, and My Journey with Autism (Harper Horizon, 2025, with Leland Vittert)
22. The Business of Storytelling: Inspire Action, Build Trust, and Drive Results Through Story (Forbes Books, 2026)
23. Behind the Castle Walls: My Thirty Years at the Happiest Place on Earth (Gallery Books, 2026, with Bob Chapek)
