= Lawrence B. Jones =

American political commentator (born 1992)

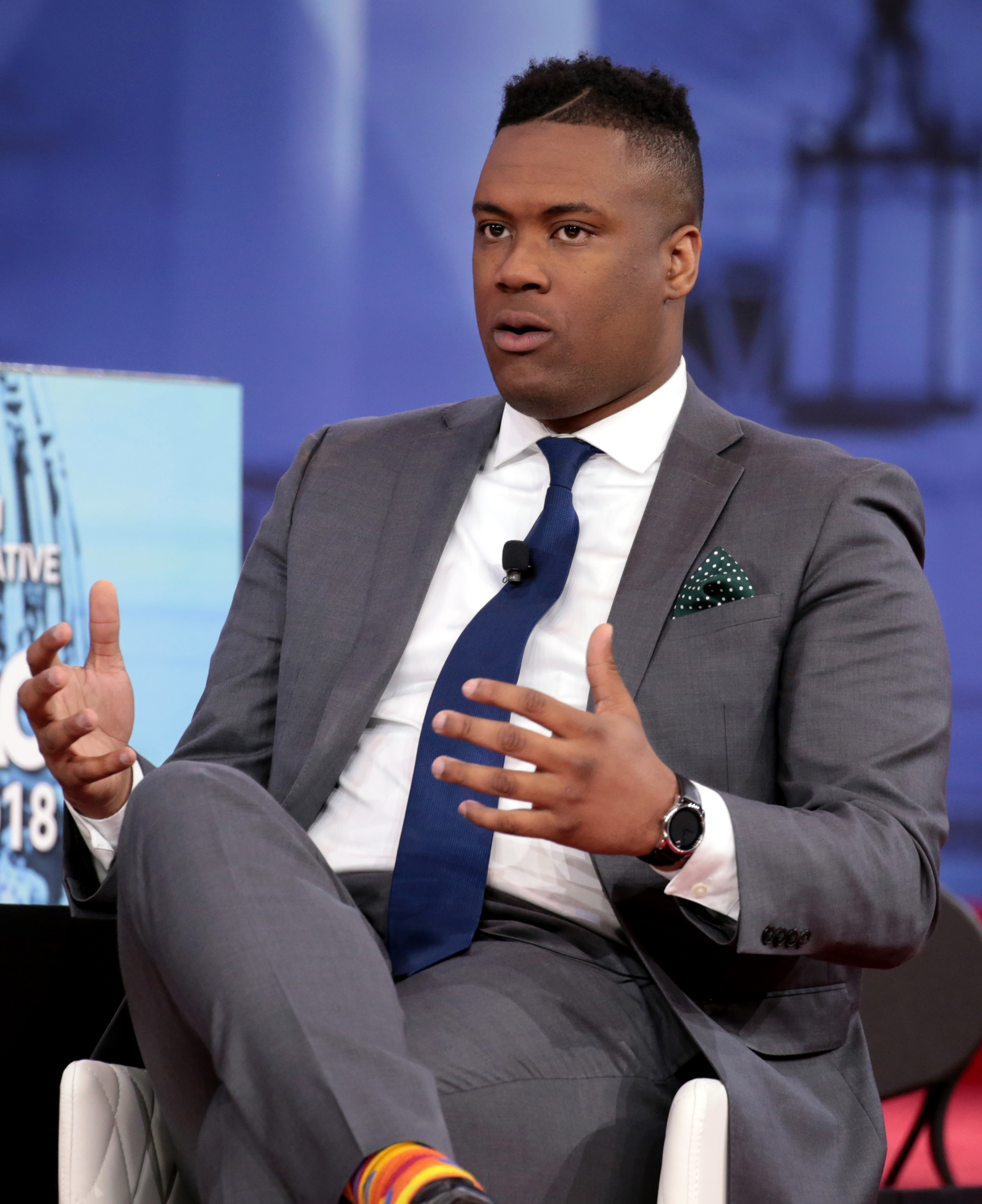
- Jones in 2018
- Born: Lawrence Billy Jones III; December 10, 1992 (age 33); Garland, Texas, U.S.
- Education: University of North Texas (BA)
- Occupations: Radio host; television host; commentator
- Employer: Fox News
- Political party: Libertarian
- Website: https://www.lawrencejones.com/

Lawrence Billy Jones III (born December 10, 1992) is an American libertarian political commentator, author and a current co-host of the weekday edition of Fox & Friends on the Fox News Channel. He served as host of Lawrence Jones Cross Country from 2022 to 2023. In September 2023, Jones, 30, became the youngest Black co-host on cable news.

== Early life ==
Jones was raised by his mother, Tameria, and father, Lawrence Jones II. Jones has stated that he served as "youth mayor" of Garland, Texas, in 2009. He graduated from Garland High School in 2011 and studied political science and criminal justice at the University of North Texas.

== Career ==
Jones was hired as student advocate in the Garland Independent School District, becoming their youngest employee. When he was 19, he ran for a seat on the school board for this district, but lost. He served two years as a board member for Dallas County Child Welfare. In 2012, Jones was on the Garland Parks and Recreation Board. In 2013, he was named Activist of the Year by FreedomWorks. That year, he went undercover for Project Veritas, the conservative organization founded by James O'Keefe known for publishing deceptively edited videos, for the purpose of exposing allegations of fraud among vendors who enrolled individuals in the healthcare marketplace of the Patient Protection and Affordable Care Act.

In April 2015, Jones created a fundraiser for Memories Pizza, a pizza shop in Indiana that closed after receiving backlash when its owners said they would refuse to cater a gay wedding if asked. The fundraiser raised $844,000 for the family, which was used in part for bills and partly donated to charity and the owner's church.

He hosts The Lawrence Jones Show on TheBlaze Radio Network. He was previously a contributor to conservative television show Dana, hosted by Dana Loesch on Blaze Media.

In February 2018, he became editor-in-chief of the conservative website Campus Reform.

In 2020, Jones considered himself libertarian.

=== Fox News ===
In May 2018, Jones claimed on Fox News that, because ESPN personality Jemele Hill was unemployed, she therefore did not deserve a journalism award from the National Association of Black Journalists, and that the NABJ was seeking to "applaud unemployment."

In April 2019, Jones wore a small bulletproof vest during a Fox News segment where he was at the Mexico–United States border in Laredo, Texas. He was subsequently mocked online, and a number of journalists who routinely cover the border region said they have never used protective gear in the course of the reporting. In his next appearance on Fox News, Jones wore a larger vest and said that the U.S. Border Patrol had told him to wear a bulletproof vest for his safety.

In July 2019, Jones blamed the Obama Administration for a lenient plea deal that sex offender and accused child sex trafficker Jeffrey Epstein received in 2008, incorrectly asserting that Obama was president at the time.

In October 2019, Jones relocated to New York City after it was announced that he had been promoted to a regular substitute host and co-host role at Fox News. In 2022, he began hosting Lawrence Jones Cross Country on the network, in the former time slot of Justice with Judge Jeanine.

At the end of April 2023, Jones was selected to host Fox News Tonight for the week of May 1, the 8pm time slot on Fox News, serving as a temporary replacement for Tucker Carlson on filling the cancelled Tucker Carlson Tonight slot, following Fox's decision to part ways with Carlson. Jones helmed the program again for the week of June 26, 2023.

On September 14, 2023, Fox News announced that Jones had been named a permanent co-host of Fox & Friends, and his weekend program was replaced with a program hosted by Brian Kilmeade.
