= Griff Jenkins =

American television personality

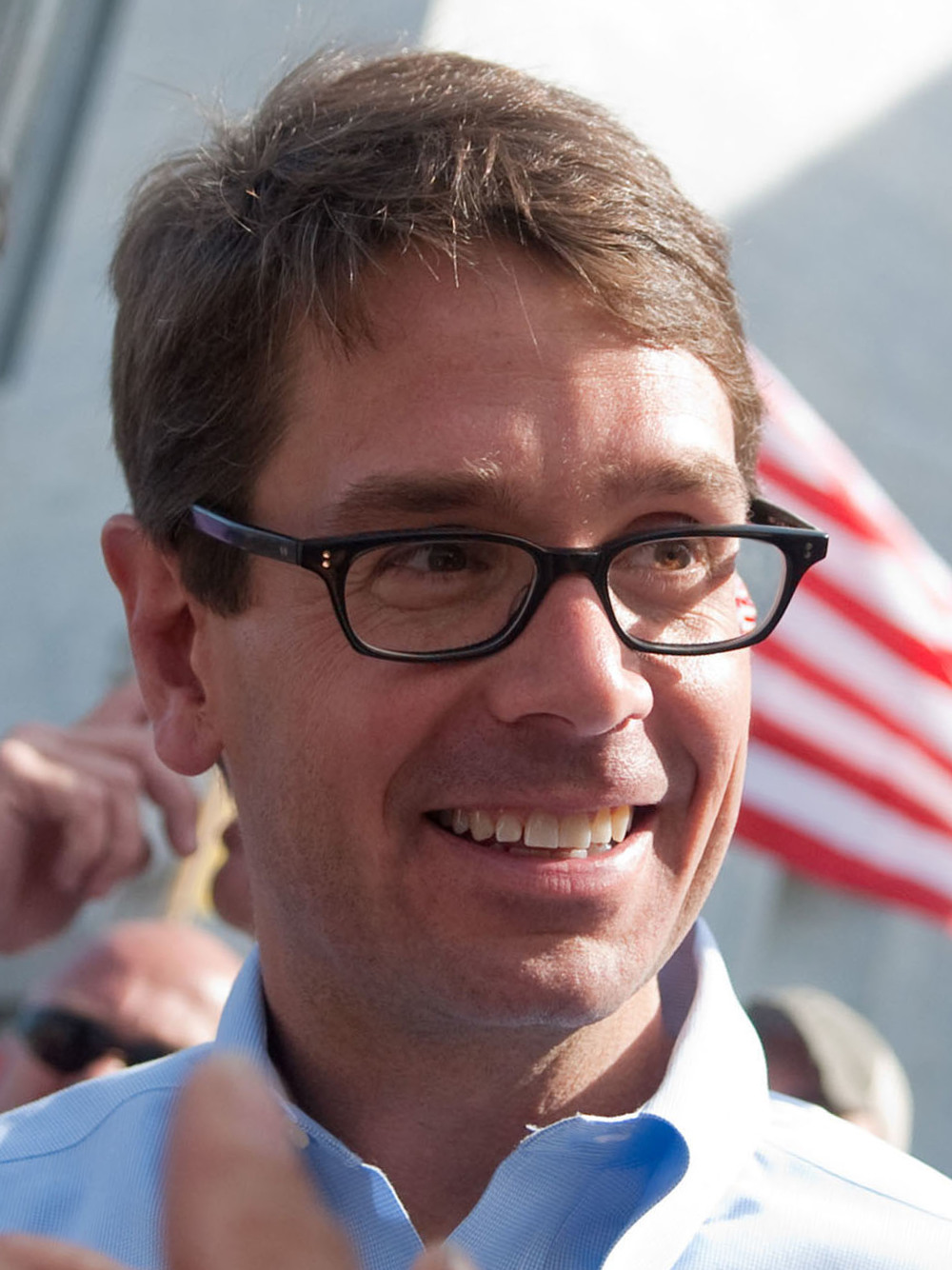
- Jenkins in 2010
- Born: William Griffin Jenkins; December 15, 1970 (age 55); Los Angeles, California, US
- Education: University of Mississippi (BA)
- Occupation: Broadcast journalist

William Griffin Jenkins (born December 15, 1970) is an American television and radio personality, reporter, and producer for Fox News Channel.

== Education ==
Jenkins graduated from the Memphis University School in 1989. He earned a B.A. degree in English from the University of Mississippi in 1993.

== Career ==
After college, Jenkins was an intern for Republican Congressman Don Sundquist. In 1993, Jenkins began working at Salem Radio Network where he served as an associate producer for Oliver North's War Stories and produced the syndicated radio program Common Sense Radio with Oliver North.

He currently works out of Washington, DC, for Fox News Channel, having joined the network as a radio producer in 2003. Jenkins worked as a producer for the Tony Snow Radio Program until Snow accepted the role of White House Press Secretary in 2006. He occasionally co-hosted Fox & Friends Weekend as a substitute and for the vacant weekend third seat until September 10, 2025, when he was named to fill that seat. He was a frequent guest on Red Eye w/ Greg Gutfeld, a late night news program.

== Personal life ==
Jenkins and his wife Kathleen reside in Washington, D.C. with their two daughters, Madeline and Mackenzie.
