= AutoAdmit =

Law forum

- Website type: Internet forum
- Available in: English
- Owner: Jarret Cohen
- Creator: Jarret Cohen
- Website: www.autoadmit.com
- Commercial: No
- Registration: Required
- Launched: 17 March 2004
- Current status: Active

AutoAdmit, also known as Xoxohth, is a website for prospective and current law students and lawyers. Its largely unmoderated law school message board is now the only active section, though it previously featured pages for undergraduates, business students, and graduate school, and recently introduced a crypto currency discussion page. The message board, which bills itself as "the most prestigious law school discussion board in the world", has drawn the attention and criticism of some in the legal community and the media for its lack of moderation of offensive and defamatory content.

== History ==
AutoAdmit, originally named Xoxohth, was founded in early 2004 by Jarret "rachmiel" Cohen. It was programmed in PHP from scratch by Cohen and a Massachusetts Institute of Technology student under the moniker "Boondocks" in order to emulate the old Allaire Forums software the Princeton Review message boards used. AutoAdmit's first users were dissatisfied with changes made to the Princeton Review message board in March 2004, such as stricter moderation of discussions and the abandonment of the message board's popular tree format in favor of a vBulletin-type format.

The website was the inspiration for a 2007 call for papers by the Yale Law Journal on the topic of anonymous internet speech.

== Criticism and controversy ==
=== Trolling ===
On 11 March 2005, Brian Leiter of the University of Texas at Austin accused AutoAdmit on his blog of being "a massive forum for bizarre racist, anti-semitic, and viciously sexist postings, mixed in with posts genuinely related to law school".

AutoAdmit moderators countered that Leiter mischaracterized the website and that the professor of law and philosophy deliberately searched for racist, xenophobic, homophobic, transphobic, sexist, chauvinistic, bigoted, and antisemitic threads in an attempt to misconstrue the site's focus on law school discussion. An AutoAdmit webpage dedicated to providing additional context was created by contributors to AutoAdmit.

=== Anonymous speech and harassment ===
On 1 March 2007, ABC News profiled two Yale Law School students who alleged that harassing and defamatory comments had been posted about them on AutoAdmit. On 7 March 2007, The Washington Post published a front-page article featuring AutoAdmit that reported similar allegations and raised questions regarding freedom of speech and anonymity. On 19 March 2007, an editorial by Elizabeth Wurtzel in The Wall Street Journal criticized the AutoAdmit law message board as a forum of "mean-spirited" gossip.

The publicity created debate as well as a new wave of harassment of the Yale Law School students, including an incident that led Anthony Ciolli, a third-year law student at the University of Pennsylvania and one of AutoAdmit's administrators, to resign. The law firm Edwards Angell Palmer & Dodge revoked an offer of employment to Ciolli; Charles DeWitt, managing partner at the firm's Boston office, explained to Ciolli via private correspondence, "We expect any lawyer affiliated with our firm, when presented with the kind of language exhibited on the message board, to reject it and to disavow any affiliation with it. You, instead, facilitated the expression and publication of such language."

Deans from Yale Law School and the University of Pennsylvania Law School condemned the misogynistic and defamatory postings on AutoAdmit. Others have noted that this behavior is so unethical as to jeopardize one's prospects for bar admission and employment. Brad Wendel, a legal ethics professor at Cornell Law School, wrote, "If I were one of the students who made some of the worst of these comments, I'd be sweating bullets right now."

=== Lawsuits ===
On 12 June 2007, the two Yale Law School students filed a lawsuit against Anthony Ciolli and a number of AutoAdmit's anonymous posters, claiming their "character, intelligence, appearance, and sexual lives have been thoroughly trashed by the defendants". Filed in the District Court of Connecticut, the case, Doe v. Ciolli, 307CV00909 CFD, cited violation of privacy, defamation, infliction of undue emotional distress, and copyright infringement against Ciolli and several anonymous posters. The two plaintiffs were represented pro bono by the litigation boutique Keker & Van Nest LLP, David N. Rosen, a Yale Law School professor, and Mark Lemley, a professor at Stanford Law School who specializes in computer and internet law. It was said at the time that while AutoAdmit's reported lack of IP logging might prevent the plaintiffs from learning the defendants' true identities, the case could prove significant within computer and internet law if it came to trial. The plaintiffs subsequently dropped Ciolli's name from the list of defendants, and successfully obtained Doe subpoenas of Internet service providers (ISPs) in hopes of identifying the anonymous defendants. As of August 2008 the attorneys had discovered the names of some, but not all, of the offending posters.

In March 2008, Anthony Ciolli filed his own suit against Heide Iravani, Brittan Heller, Ross Chanin, Reputation Defender, the law firm of Keker & Van Nest, as well as lawyer David N. Rosen and law professor Mark Lemley in the Eastern District of Pennsylvania.

=== Blake Neff controversy ===
In July 2020, Blake Neff, the head writer for Tucker Carlson Tonight, resigned from Fox News after it emerged he had made anonymous posts on AutoAdmit that featured content that were racist, sexist, and homophobic in nature.
