= Brian Kilmeade =

American presenter and commentator (born 1964)

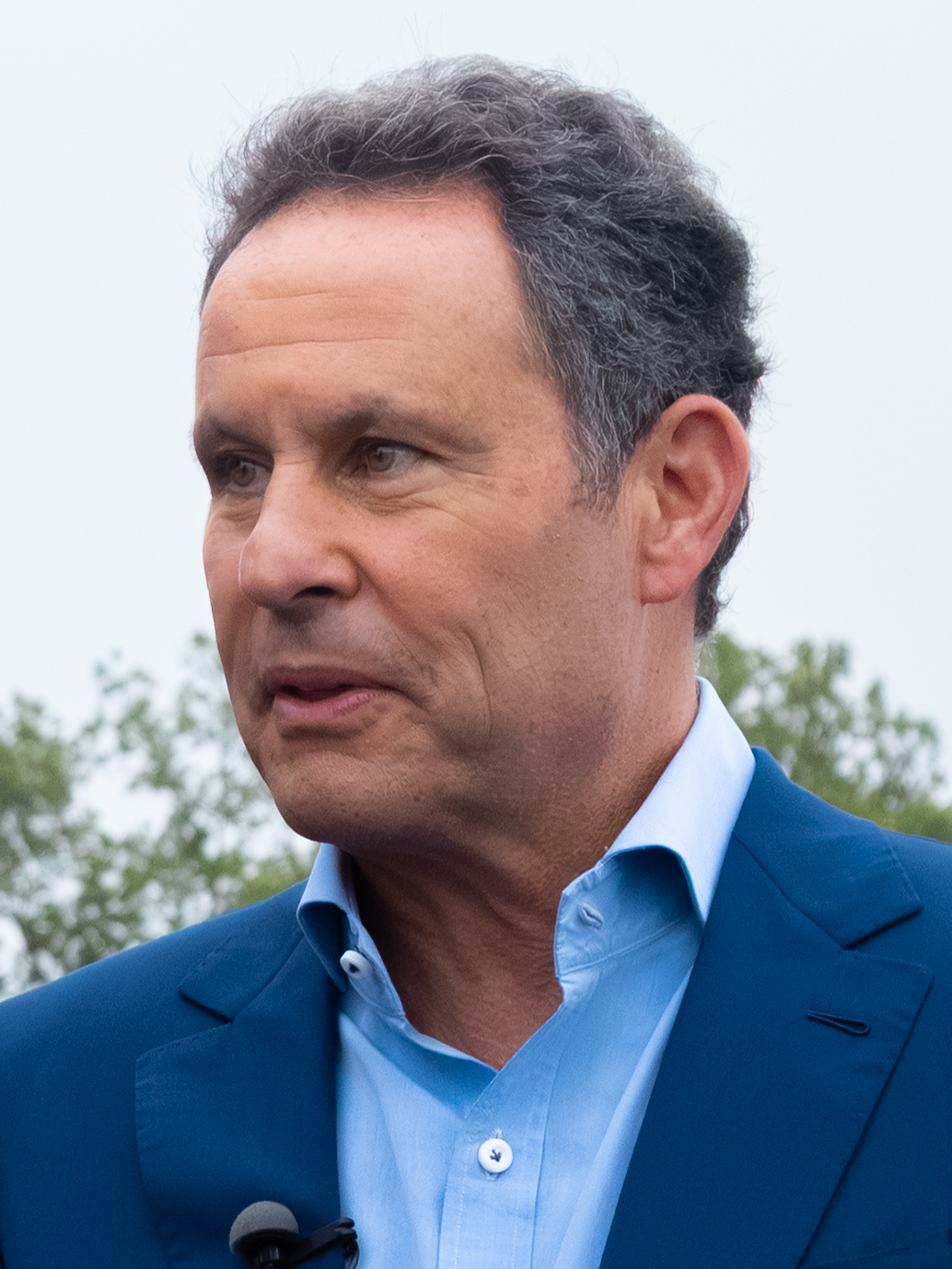
- Kilmeade in 2025
- Born: May 7, 1964 (age 62); Massapequa, New York, US
- Education: Long Island University (BA)
- Spouse: Dawn DeGaetano
- Children: 3
- Website: briankilmeade.com

Brian Kilmeade (born May 7, 1964) is an American conservative television and radio presenter and political commentator for Fox News. On weekdays, he co-hosts the morning show Fox & Friends and he hosts the Fox News Radio program The Brian Kilmeade Show. On weekends, he hosts One Nation with Brian Kilmeade, which premiered in 2022. He has also authored or co-authored non-fiction and fiction books.

== Early life and education ==
Kilmeade, born in 1964 in Massapequa, New York, is the second son of Marie Rose (née D'Andrea) Kilmeade and James Kilmeade Jr., who married in 1960. Brian's father was born in 1931, the son of James Kilmeade Sr., who was born in 1905 in Longford, Ireland, immigrated to New York in 1925, and became a U.S. citizen in 1930. His mother was born in 1934 in Ozone Park and raised in St. Albans, Queens.

After graduating from Massapequa High School in 1982, Kilmeade attended LIU Post in Brookville, New York, and graduated with a Bachelor of Arts in 1986.

== Career ==
Kilmeade began his career as a correspondent on Channel One News, a daily national high school television news program. He later served as an anchor and host for KHSL-TV in Chico, California. He co-hosted The Jim Brown Show on KLSD, an all-sports radio network. In 1993, Kilmeade joined Jim Brown as part of the announcing team for the inaugural Ultimate Fighting Championship event, conducting post-fight interviews. He moved into the play-by-play role for UFC 2 and UFC 3 in 1994.

Kilmeade was a freelance sports anchor for WVIT (NBC) in Hartford, Connecticut, beginning in 1997. He was a sideline reporter for MSG's coverage of Major League Soccer, specifically for the MetroStars.

Later, he worked as a feature reporter and anchor for NewSport where he hosted NewSport Journal, a daily magazine show for the national sports network. He also anchored Scoreboard Central, a live half-hour general sports program. According to his website biography, he has 10 years' experience as a stand-up comedian.

Since 1998, Kilmeade has co-hosted Fox's cable morning television show, Fox & Friends, along with Steve Doocy and E. D. Hill. In April 2006, he filled in the Fox News Radio time slot of former Fox anchor Tony Snow, who had left the network to become the White House press secretary for the George W. Bush administration. He is a frequent panelist on The Five airing nightly at 5 p.m. eastern on FNC. He also hosts the Fox News Radio program The Brian Kilmeade Show and hosts "What Made America Great" on Fox Nation. As of 2022, he also hosts One Nation with Brian Kilmeade, weekends on Fox News.

In late April 2023, Kilmeade was selected to replace the removed Tucker Carlson, in hosting Fox News Tonight, the replacement for Tucker Carlson Tonight, for the week of April 24.

== Political views ==
Kilmeade, during an interview, expressed support for Tommy Robinson, a British far-right activist and co-founder of the English Defence League, which has been described by one writer as a "leading counter-Jihad group". Kilmeade concluded the interview with the words "Tommy, we got your back and we'll definitely keep in touch and I really think it's great what you're doing".

On July 8, 2009, Kilmeade and two co-hosts were discussing a study that, based on research done in Finland and Sweden, showed people who stay married are less likely to develop Alzheimer's disease. Kilmeade, whose paternal grandfather was Irish, commented, "[In the United States] we keep marrying other species and other ethnics." Ignoring attempts by co-host Gretchen Carlson (who is of Swedish descent) to interrupt him, he added, "See, the problem is the Swedes have pure genes. Because they marry other Swedes... Finns marry other Finns, so they have a pure society. In America we marry everybody, we marry Italians and Irish." On July 20, 2009, Kilmeade apologized for his remarks, saying, "I made comments that were offensive to many people. That was not my intention, and looking back at those comments I realize they were inappropriate. For that I sincerely apologize. America [is a] huge melting pot, and that is what makes us such a great country."

In 2010, Kilmeade said "not all Muslims are terrorists, but all terrorists are Muslims." He later said he misspoke, "I don't believe all terrorists are Muslims... What I should have said, and I'd like to clarify, is all terrorists who killed us on 9/11; with the Cole; and the Khobar; and the '98 embassies; that's what I should have said."

On June 3, 2014, Kilmeade made a reference about Bowe Bergdahl's father on air, stating, "I mean, he says he was growing his beard because his son was in captivity. Well, your son's out now. So if you really don't want to no longer look like a member of the Taliban, you don't have to look like a member of the Taliban. Are you out of razors?"

In August 2022, while serving as the fill-in-host of Tucker Carlson Tonight, Kilmeade shared a digitally-altered photo of federal magistrate Judge Bruce Reinhart receiving a foot massage from convicted sex offender Ghislaine Maxwell. Prior to sharing the photoshopped image, Reinhart, who approved the search warrant used by the FBI during their search of Mar-a-Lago, had already been receiving violent and antisemitic death threats. The next day, Kilmeade issued a statement that the photo was fake and that it had been shown as a joke.

On September 10, 2025, during a Fox & Friends segment discussing the killing of Iryna Zarutska by a homeless man with schizophrenia, co-host Lawrence B. Jones argued that mentally ill homeless people who refuse treatment should be forced to either "take the resources that we're going to give you or you decide that you are going to be locked up in jail." In response to this discussion, Kilmeade said, "Or involuntary lethal injection. Or something. Just kill them." On September 14, 2025, during Fox & Friends Weekend, Kilmeade apologized, saying: "During that discussion, I wrongly said they should get lethal injections. I apologize for that extremely callous remark. I'm obviously aware that not all mentally ill homeless people act as the perpetrator did in North Carolina and that so many people deserve our empathy and compassion."

=== Donald Trump ===
On June 22, 2018, Kilmeade on Fox & Friends defended the Trump administration family separation policy by saying, "Like it or not, these are not our kids" in reference to children of immigrants who illegally crossed the Mexico–United States border who had been separated from their parents and put in detainment.

In 2018, Kilmeade criticized Lesley Stahl of 60 Minutes for asking President Donald Trump about climate change. Kilmeade said that Stahl was pushing an "agenda" and injecting her "point of view" into the interview by asking the President whether he truly believed climate change was a hoax. Kilmeade said, "She really believes in global warming and that's fine, and man's role in climate change and that's okay. But I don't think you should bring your point of view ― she was trying to win over the president with her point of view. There are other scientists. Something is going on out there. The role of man has not been unveiled in a way the president accepts."

During the 2021 January 6 United States Capitol attack, Kilmeade sent messages to White House Chief of Staff Mark Meadows, telling him to get Trump to condemn the on-going riot. Kilmeade wrote, "Please, get him on TV." and "Destroying everything you have accomplished."

In January 2022, Kilmeade spoke more critically of Trump, telling Trump that he should "learn to lose" and stating that he had "not seen any" proof that the 2020 election had been stolen from Trump. Kilmeade also encouraged Republicans to "get past questioning election results" and stop calling the media "anti-Trump" for accurately pointing out the false election conspiracy theories.

== Personal life ==
Kilmeade is married to Dawn Kilmeade (née DeGaetano), and they have three children.

== Books ==
- Kilmeade, Brian (October 12, 2004). The Games Do Count: America's Best and Brightest on the Power of Sports. Los Angeles, California: ReganBooks. ISBN 978-0060736736.
- Kilmeade, Brian (May 1, 2007). It's How You Play the Game: The Powerful Sports Moments that Taught Lasting Values to America's Finest. New York City: HarperCollins. ISBN 978-0061237263.
- Kilmeade, Brian; Yaeger, Don (November 5, 2013). George Washington's Secret Six: The Spy Ring That Saved the American Revolution. New York City: Sentinel HC. ISBN 978-1595231031., an historical novel based on facts of the Culper Ring spies who worked for George Washington during the American Revolution
- Kilmeade, Brian; Yaeger, Don (November 3, 2015). Thomas Jefferson and the Tripoli Pirates: The Forgotten War That Changed American History. New York City: Sentinel HC. ISBN 978-1591848066., about President Thomas Jefferson and the First Barbary War
- Kilmeade, Brian; Yaeger, Don (October 24, 2017). Andrew Jackson and the Miracle of New Orleans: The Battle That Shaped America's Destiny. New York City: Sentinel HC. ISBN 978-0735213234., about President Andrew Jackson and the Battle of New Orleans
- Kilmeade, Brian (November 5, 2019). Sam Houston and the Alamo Avengers: The Texas Victory That Changed American History. New York, New York: Sentinel. ISBN 978-0525540533.
- Kilmeade, Brian (November 2, 2021). The President and the Freedom Fighter: Abraham Lincoln, Frederick Douglass, and Their Battle to Save America's Soul. New York, New York: Sentinel. ISBN 978-0525540571.
- Kilmeade, Brian (2023). Teddy and Booker T.: How Two American Icons Blazed for Racial Equality. New York, New York: Sentinel. ISBN 978-0593792629.
