= The Charlie Kirk Show =

American political podcast

- Cover image
- Genre: Politics, news, talk
- Format: Video, audio
- Country of origin: United States
- Language: English

Creative team
- Created by: Charlie Kirk

Cast and voices
- Hosted by: Charlie Kirk (2019–2025); Andrew Kolvet (2025–present); Blake Neff (2025–present)

Production
- Length: 2–3 hours

Publication
- No. of episodes: 1,608 total (2026)
- Original release: 2019
- Provider: Salem Media Group, YouTube, Spotify, Apple Podcasts
- Updates: Monday to Friday

Reception
- Ratings: 4.6 / 5 (Apple Podcasts); 3.6 / 10 (IMDb); 4.5 / 5 (Spotify)

Related
- Website: www.charliekirk.com/podcasts

YouTube information
- Channel: Charlie Kirk
- Years active: 2018–present
- Genres: News & Politics
- Subscribers: 5.92 million
- Views: 1.38 billion
- Last updated: October 7, 2026

The Charlie Kirk Show is an American talk show on Salem Media Group's "The Answer" radio channel. It was hosted by conservative political activist and its namesake Charlie Kirk until his assassination on September 10, 2025.

The show features daily news on events, politics, culture, and media from a conservative perspective and is associated with the organization Turning Point USA (TPUSA), which Kirk co-founded.

It was one of the most popular podcasts on Apple Podcasts. According to Turning Point USA, Kirk's podcast was downloaded 500,000 to 750,000 times each day in 2024, and is one of the biggest shows on Rumble, having over 1.90 million subscribers. As of 2026, the show is run by Andrew Kolvet and Blake Neff.

== Overview ==
The Charlie Kirk Show is a daily news and commentary podcast in which Charlie Kirk, or a substitute host since Kirk's assassination, discusses recent political developments, interviews guests, and offers opinion-based analysis of U.S. cultural and political issues. It is known for its conversational style and focus on conservative activism, aimed at younger audiences and college students.

The program is distributed as both a radio show and a podcast and has also been available through streaming platforms and social media.

== History ==
The show launched in 2019 following the growth of Turning Point USA, the organization Kirk founded in 2012. The program expanded from earlier media appearances and debates into a regular broadcast, eventually becoming a daily show.

Over time, it became one of the most prominent conservative political podcasts in the United States, frequently appearing in news and politics rankings on podcast platforms. such as Spotify, Apple Podcasts, etc.

On September 10, 2025, Charlie Kirk was assassinated while speaking at a debate event. After his assassination, other co-hosts that were alongside Kirk on the show and Turning Point USA took over The Charlie Kirk Show and relaunched it. The show and Kirk's books saw a high amount of sales following his assassination.

== Influence ==
The Charlie Kirk Show has played a role in expanding Charlie Kirk's influence as a prominent conservative media figure. It has also contributed to Turning Point USA's visibility and its outreach to younger audiences, particularly students.

== Format ==
The show typically features news and talk on current political events, discussions of U.S. cultural, social, and sometimes religious issues, with interviews with political figures, commentators, and activists. Kirk would also host a segment on his show where a supporter of his could ask him questions.

== See also ==
- Erika Kirk – American businesswoman (born 1988)
