= Fox & Friends =

US television program

- Fox & Friends logo (2024–present)
- Genre: Talk show; News program
- Presented by: Weekdays: Brian Kilmeade; Ainsley Earhardt; Lawrence Jones; Carley Shimkus; Steve Doocy; Weekends: Rachel Campos-Duffy; Charles Hurt; Griff Jenkins; Adam Klotz
- Country of origin: United States
- Original language: English
- No. of seasons: 27

Production
- Production locations: New York City, New York
- Camera setup: Multi-camera
- Running time: Weekday 180 minutes Weekend 240 minutes

Original release
- Network: Fox; Fox News
- Release: February 1, 1998 – present

Fox & Friends is an American daily morning conservative news and talk program that airs on Fox News. It premiered on February 1, 1998, and is currently hosted by Brian Kilmeade, Ainsley Earhardt and Lawrence Jones on weekdays. Rachel Campos-Duffy, Charles Hurt and Griff Jenkins helm the weekend editions of the show.

It begins at 6:00 a.m. Eastern Time with the latest Fox News Live headlines and news of the morning and continues with a variety of segments including current events, interviews, updates of news stories with correspondents, political analysis from the hosts and entertainment segments.

== History ==
Fox & Friends evolved from Fox X-press, Fox News Channel's original morning news program.

After the September 11 attacks, an additional hour was added to the beginning of the weekday show, but branded as a separate show called Fox & Friends First. It was the first Fox News show to air live for the day, starting at 6:00 a.m. It was discontinued on July 13, 2008, and replaced with an additional hour of Fox & Friends. The Fox & Friends First title was reintroduced on March 5, 2012, also as a separate show airing one hour before the main three-hour program, but using a separate slate of rotating anchors.

On May 1, 2025, veteran co-host Steve Doocy announced that he will be taking a step back from hosting the flagship program and will now be working three days per week from Florida, focusing on special projects for the show.

On June 25, 2026, long-time meteorologist Janice Dean announced in an Instagram video that she would be leaving the network after over two decades amid her progressing battle with multiple sclerosis.

== Format ==
Fox & Friends has been described as being more akin to the Big Three television networks than its cable competitors (particularly CNN This Morning and MSNOW's Morning Joe), with a mix of news, entertainment and lifestyle-oriented segments, and a generally casual presentation. However, as with the morning shows on competing cable news channels, its news content largely concentrates on politics. Currently, Brian Kilmeade, Ainsley Earhardt and Lawrence Jones co-host the program Monday through Friday. Rachel Campos-Duffy, Charles Hurt and Griff Jenkins co-host on the weekends.

Some regular fill in hosts include Todd Piro, Sandra Smith, Joey Jones, Kayleigh McEnany, Lisa Boothe, Carley Shimkus and Guy Benson.

=== Recurring segments ===
- The "Summer Concert Series" features a live music concert in the Fox News Plaza each Friday from Memorial Day weekend through Labor Day weekend.
- "So Sue Me" is a segment in which Peter Johnson Jr. (an appellate and trial lawyer) offers his perspective on current events with legal implications.

== Ratings ==
The New York Times has reported the show is one of the most successful on the network. After the arrival of Elisabeth Hasselbeck in September 2013, the show climbed 23 percent in total viewers compared to its average for the third quarter of 2013, and 22 percent in the key 25–54 news demo. For Hasselbeck's first four weeks on the show, Fox & Friends averaged 1.226 million total viewers, up from the 1.058 that the show averaged for the third quarter of the year.

In February 2017, the program's average ratings increased to around 1.7 million viewers, fueled by the recent inauguration of Republican candidate Donald Trump as president. In the first quarter of 2025 it was reported that the show attracted an average of 715,000 viewers for Fox & Friends First and 1.5 million viewers in the 6–9 AM weekday hours. While Fox & Friends Weekend averaged 1.5 million viewers during the same period.

== Political stance ==
In 2012, The New York Times wrote that Fox & Friends "has become a powerful platform for some of the most strident attacks on President Obama". The program has provided a platform for Barack Obama religion conspiracy theories and, in May 2012, aired a 4-minute video attacking Obama's record as president. The video was widely criticized as a political attack ad masquerading as journalism; Time magazine television critic James Poniewozik wrote: "It's hard to imagine a more over-the-top parody of Fox News raw-meat-hurling, fear-stoking, base-pleasing agitprop." In response, a Fox News executive vice-president 'disavowed' the video, blaming an associate producer and that the video 'slipped by' senior managers at the network. Fox News stated that the show was entertainment and "does not pretend to be straight news."

U.S. president Donald Trump is a regular viewer of Fox & Friends, and praised the program for its favorable coverage of his presidency during his first term. Critics noted that Trump often tweeted about stories on Fox & Friends as they aired, creating a "feedback loop" when the stories were subsequently discussed as national issues because they were mentioned by Trump on social media.

Trump was a frequent guest on Fox & Friends before his presidency. In 2018, Fox News announced that he would appear on the show to offer commentary every Monday.

On April 26, 2018, Trump was interviewed by phone on Fox & Friends in a segment that stretched to nearly half an hour, and discussed several recent topics and controversies surrounding himself and his government. Trump said that he might interfere with the Special Counsel investigation, acknowledged that lawyer Michael Cohen had represented Trump in the Stormy Daniels–Donald Trump scandal, and said that he had gotten a card and flowers for Melania Trump, his wife, whose birthday was the same day.

== Hosts ==
=== Weekdays ===
- Brian Kilmeade, co-host; 1998–present
- Ainsley Earhardt, co-host; 2016–present
- Lawrence Jones, co-host; 2023–present
- Carley Shimkus, news anchor; 2021–present
- Steve Doocy, special projects; 2025–present (co-host 1998–2025)

=== Weekends ===
- Rachel Campos-Duffy, co-host; 2021–present
- Charles Hurt, co-host; 2025–present
- Griff Jenkins, co-host; 2025–present
- Adam Klotz, meteorologist; 2025–present

=== Former ===
- Jedediah Bila, weekend co-host from 2019 to 2021 (replaced by Rachel Campos-Duffy)
- Dave Briggs, weekend co-host from 2008 to 2012 (replaced by Tucker Carlson)
- Alisyn Camerota, weekend co-host from 2008 to 2013
- Gretchen Carlson, weekdays co-host from 2006 to 2013 (replaced by Elisabeth Hasselbeck)
- Will Cain, weekend co-host from 2020 to 2025 (replaced by Charles Hurt)
- Tucker Carlson, weekend co-host from 2012 to 2016
- Kiran Chetry, weekend co-host from 2005 to 2007
- Janice Dean, co-host/weather presenter; 2004 to 2026
- Elisabeth Hasselbeck, weekdays co-host from 2013 to 2015 (replaced by Ainsley Earhardt)
- Pete Hegseth, weekend co-host from 2017 to 2024 (left to become United States Secretary of Defense; replaced by Griff Jenkins)
- Ed Henry, weekend co-host from 2017 to 2019 (replaced by Will Cain)
- Page Hopkins, former weekend co-host
- E. D. Hill, weekdays co-host from 1998 to 2006 (replaced by Gretchen Carlson)
- Juliet Huddy, former weekend and substitute co-host
- Abby Huntsman, weekend co-host from 2016 to 2018 (replaced by Jedediah Bila)
- Mike Jerrick, former weekend co-host
- Greg Kelly, weekend co-host from 2007 to 2008
- Anna Kooiman, weekend co-host from 2012 to 2016 (replaced by Abby Huntsman)
- Jillian Mele, weekdays news anchor from 2017 to 2021 (replaced by Carley Shimkus)
- Maria Molina, Fox Cast meteorologist from 2010 to 2016
- Clayton Morris, weekend co-host from 2008 to 2017 (replaced by Pete Hegseth)
- Julian Phillips, former weekend co-host
- Rick Reichmuth, weekend meteorologist from 2006 to 2025 (replaced by Adam Klotz)
- Kelly Wright, weekend co-host from 2006 to 2008

Preceded by Fox & Friends First	Fox & Friends; 6:00 AM – 9:00 AM	Succeeded by America's Newsroom

Preceded by The Five repeat (Saturdays); One Nation with Brian Kilmeade repeat (Sundays)	Fox & Friends Weekend; 6:00 AM – 10:00 AM	Succeeded by Saturday in America with Kayleigh McEnany (Saturdays); Sunday Morning Futures w/ Maria Bartiromo (Sundays)
