= Andrew Kolvet =

American political activist (born 1983)

- Kolvet in 2026
- Born: 1983 (age 42–43); Nevada, U.S.
- Occupations: Conservative activist; spokesperson; media producer
- Years active: 2015–present
- Known for: The Charlie Kirk Show
- Political party: Republican
- Movement: Conservatism
- Children: 3

Andrew Kolvet (born 1983) is an American conservative political activist, spokesperson, and media producer. Born in Nevada, he is known for running the podcast, The Charlie Kirk Show and being close friends with Charlie Kirk. Since the assassination of Kirk in September 2025, Kolvet has been in a feud with political commentator Candace Owens. As of 2026, Kolvet still runs The Charlie Kirk Show and is the official spokesperson for Turning Point USA.

== Career ==
Kolvet became known as Charlie Kirk's executive producer for the podcast The Charlie Kirk Show. Kolvet was close to Kirk, meeting him in a hotel lobby in Los Angeles in 2017. In 2019, Kolvet and Kirk launched The Charlie Kirk Show, which, according to him, was meant to be a once-a-week podcast, but then it turned into a daily one during the COVID-19 pandemic. After Kirk's assassination in September 2025, Kolvet took on many of Kirk's responsibilities, including taking over the show and co-hosting it with Blake Neff.

In September 2025, Kolvet criticized Jimmy Kimmel's apology for lack of remorse. Also in September 2025, when the South Park episode about Kirk titled "Got a Nut" was pulled from air after Kirk's assassination, Kolvet said that "Charlie loved being in South Park" and that "He would want the episode back up".

In October 2025, Kolvet was bashed online over group chat messages between the Young Republican National Federation leaked, which allegedly contained messages such as "I love Hitler". Kolvet has had a feud with Candace Owens since late 2025. In January 2026, Owens claimed that Kolvet "betrayed" Kirk, based on a dream she had.

In July 2026, Owens called Kolvet out for "lying" about that Charlie Kirk and Benjamin Netanyahu had a conversation. In mid-July 2026, Owens called out Kolvet over a Daily Mail report on Charlie Kirk's assassination from 2025. In August 2026, Kolvet and Matt Walsh clashed with neoconservatives over the affordability crisis. In August 2026, Kolvet made a comment on the Democratic Party and Democratic socialism, saying, "These people will stop at nothing". In September 2026, Kolvet attended the court hearing of Tyler Robinson, the man accused of killing Kirk.
