= Jesse Watters Primetime =

American television program

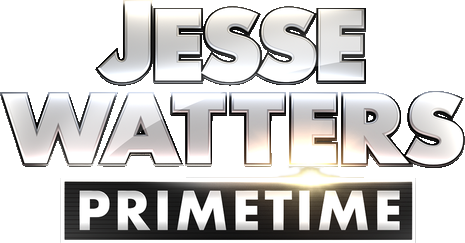
- Also known as: Watters' World (2015–2022)
- Genre: Current affairs program
- Presented by: Jesse Watters
- Country of origin: United States
- No. of seasons: 4

Production
- Production location: New York City
- Camera setup: Multi-camera
- Running time: 60 minutes (with commercials)

Original release
- Network: Fox News
- Release: November 21, 2015 – present

Jesse Watters Primetime, known as Fox News Primetime from 2021 until 2022, is an American conservative talk show and current affairs program hosted by The Five co-host and political commentator Jesse Watters. The program airs live weekdays at 8 p.m. ET and has been a part of FNC's lineup since January 24, 2022.

== Format ==
=== Opening and current events segments ===
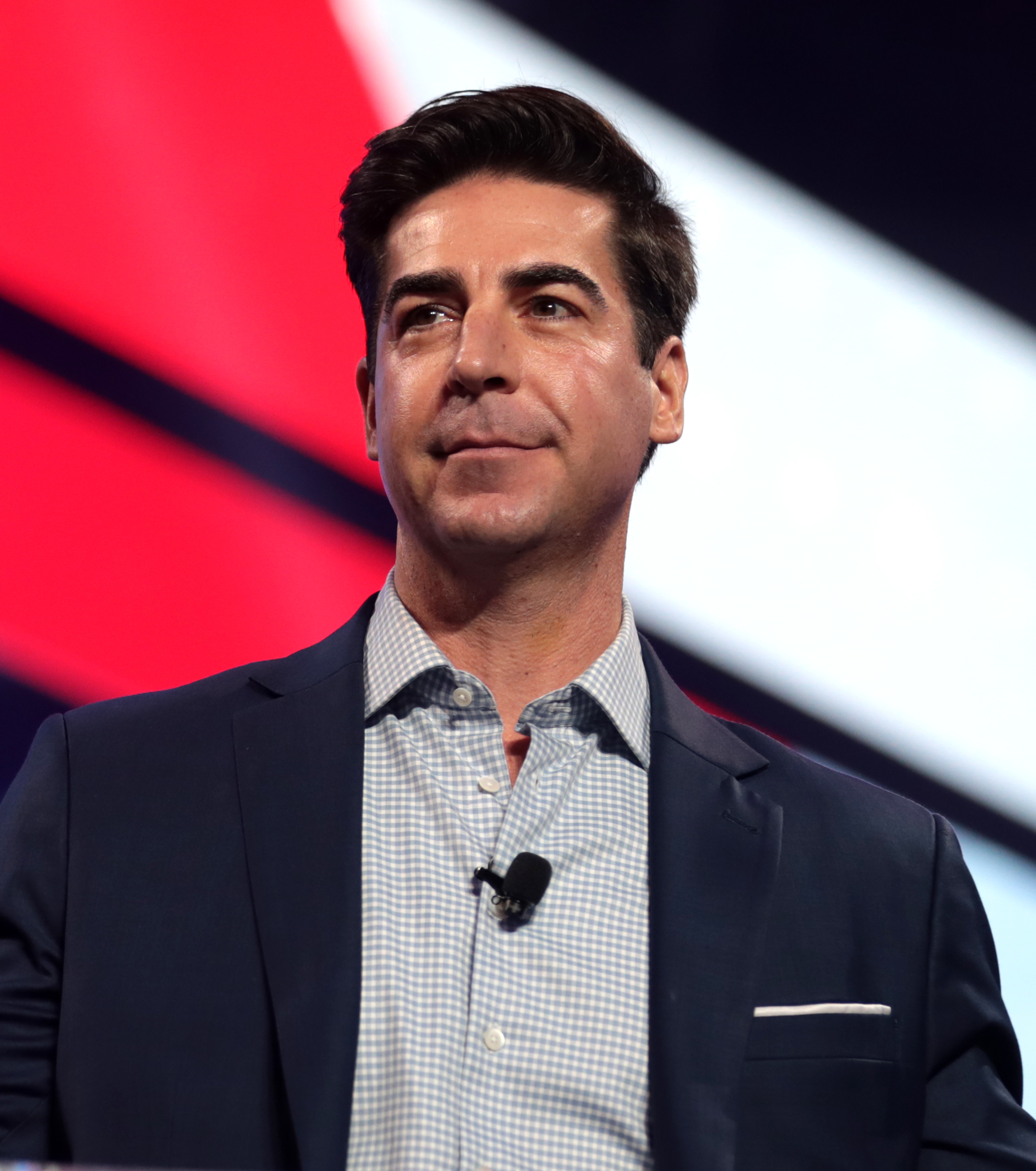
Jesse Watters, the eponymous host of Jesse Watters Primetime

Jesse Watters Primetime comprises an opening segment and several news topics; such topics are presented in a populist format. The show features guests such as political commentator Clay Travis, Candace Owens, and Dan Bongino. In one segment, Watters interviewed Doreen Ford, a moderator of the subreddit r/antiwork. Watters repeatedly mocked Ford, creating a publicity crisis for the subreddit. In response, Ford was removed as a moderator and r/antiwork shut down for several days. Following the collapse of Silicon Valley Bank, Watters said that the bank was "a woke Biden bank" and that the company held Lesbian Visibility Day and Pride Month seminars.

=== Recurring segments ===
Jesse Watters Primetime features a segment entitled "Mom Texts", in which Watters reads text messages his mother—noted to be a liberal—has sent him. The segment continues an identical segment on The Five. The show closes out the week with a game segment called "Sink or Swim", where two Fox News personalities join the show and take turns answering questions about different headlines throughout the week. Jesse Watters Primetime continues The O'Reilly Factor's "Watters' World" segments with Watters' assistant, Johnny Belisario, conducting man-on-the-street interviews. Other weekly segments include "TDS Tuesday", where Watters comments on clips of people talking about President Donald Trump; and "DEI Thursday", where Watters offers commentary of clips emanating from the DEI and LGBT communities, among others. He famously discloses a cellular telephone number, 929-286-7479, to receive texts from viewers to read on-air at the end of the show..

== Production ==
Jesse Waters Primetime features a design akin to an extreme sports show. The show is taped from Studio M at 1211 Avenue of the Americas in New York City. The studio features a "video chandelier" with a heavy duty lift system. Watters' desk is positioned in front of the video chandelier; rather than displaying graphics on the screen, graphics are overlaid on top of the screen. An alternative shot uses a video wall.

== History ==
=== Watters's involvement at Fox News and Fox News Primetime (2015–2022) ===
In 2003, Watters became involved in the production of The O'Reilly Factor. He became known on the program for man-on-the-street interviews in a segment entitled, "Watters' World". "Watters' World" was promoted to a monthly special in November 2015 through the 2016 presidential election, before being promoted to a weekly program in January 2017. In the wake of the 2020 presidential election, Fox News began a shift in its programming, giving greater prominence to opinion shows. In January 2021, Fox News shifted The Story with Martha MacCallum earlier in the day; MacCallum's show was identified as news programming. During the transition, Fox News filled the slot with a rotation of personalities under the Fox News Primetime banner, including Maria Bartiromo, Katie Pavlich, and Trey Gowdy. Watters, a co-host of The Five, was selected to be Fox News Primetime's permanent host in January 2022, forgoing Watters' World for the position. In the show's debut episode on January 24, Watters garnered an average of 3.8 million viewers, beating out Tucker Carlson Tonight. The following day, Watters averaged 3.6 million viewers. By the end of 2022, Jesse Watters Primetime was the third most watched cable news show, behind Tucker Carlson Tonight and The Five, according to Adweek.

=== Tucker Carlson's departure (2023–present) ===
On April 24, 2023, Fox News announced that Tucker Carlson had "agreed to part ways" with the network. Carlson's departure resulted in a downturn in the network's ratings as the timeslot was filled by a rotation of personalities under the Fox News Tonight branding. On June 26, Fox News announced that Watters would take over Carlson's timeslot alongside other changes to the network's programming schedule, following speculation that he would take the timeslot. The Five co-host Greg Gutfeld previously stated to The Wall Street Journal that he would no longer appear on The Five or host Gutfeld! if he were to take Carlson's timeslot.

On July 15, 2024, the show aired its highest rated episode to date, with 5.5 million viewers. This was the program's first episode since the attempted assassination of Donald Trump, as well as its first day broadcasting at the 2024 Republican National Convention.

Preceded by The Ingraham Angle	Jesse Watters Primetime; 8:00 p.m. – 9:00 p.m.	Succeeded by Hannity
