= Harris Faulkner =

American television anchor (born 1965)

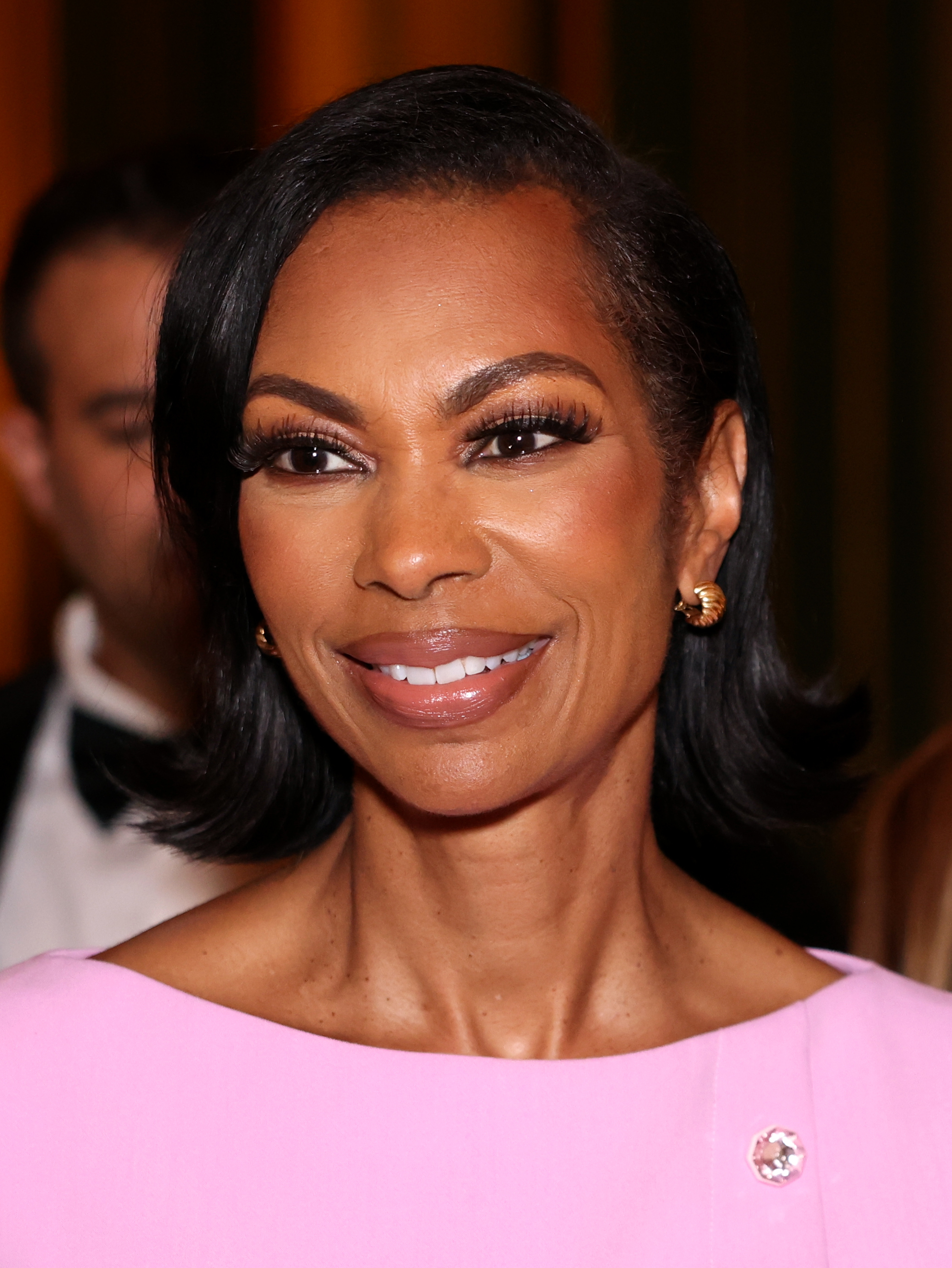
- Faulkner in 2026
- Born: Harris Kimberley Faulkner; October 13, 1965 (age 61); Atlanta, Georgia, U.S.
- Education: University of California, Santa Barbara (BA)
- Occupations: Television presenter, news anchor
- Employer: Fox Entertainment
- Spouse: Tony Berlin (m. 2003)
- Children: 2

Harris Kimberley Faulkner (born October 13, 1965) is an American conservative television news anchor and host who joined the Fox News Channel in 2005. She anchors The Faulkner Focus, a daily daytime show, and hosts Outnumbered. Additionally, she hosts her own primetime political franchise called Town Hall America with Harris Faulkner.

== Early life and education ==
Faulkner was born on October 13, 1965, at Fort McPherson in Atlanta, Georgia. Her father, the late Lieutenant Colonel Bobby R. Harris, a United States Army officer and Army Aviator, was stationed at the base and had served three tours in Vietnam. Faulkner lived in different places as a child, including in a United States military installation in Stuttgart in West Germany, while her father was still serving as a US Army pilot. Faulkner's mother is Haitian and worked as a school teacher and social worker.

Faulkner attended the University of California, Santa Barbara, and graduated with a B.A. in Mass communications.

== Career ==
Faulkner started with LA Weekly, where she contributed as a freelance business writer for $50 per article. Faulkner started her television career with an internship at KCOP-TV in Los Angeles, doing small tasks, then moved to Greenville, North Carolina, to work as a reporter and anchor at WNCT-TV.

From 1992 to 2000, Faulkner worked for Kansas City's WDAF-TV as an evening anchor. While in Kansas City, Faulkner was the victim of harassment and stalking by a former acquaintance who followed her from North Carolina.

Faulkner's next stop was at KSTP-TV in Minneapolis–Saint Paul, where she served as part of an evening anchor team. She left the station in July 2004.

Faulkner joined Fox News in 2005. She was a correspondent for the revival of A Current Affair until its cancellation in October 2005.

Faulkner anchored her first solo network newscast, Fox Report Weekend, from 2011 to 2017. In addition to Midterm Election coverage 2018, Faulkner has substitute-anchored for Shepard Smith on Shepard Smith Reporting and for Martha MacCallum on The Story. She also made frequent guest appearances on the late-night satire show Red Eye with Greg Gutfeld, before the departure of Gutfeld from that show. She now makes appearances on his week-night show Gutfeld! and serves as an occasional substitute co-host of The Five.

In April 2014, Faulkner began working as one of the co-hosts on the daytime Fox News show Outnumbered. In 2017, she became the anchor of Outnumbered Overtime, which has more of a hard news format rather than a discussion format. In early 2021, she launched her new show, The Faulkner Focus.

In June 2023, Faulkner served as a guest host of Fox News Tonight following the firing of Tucker Carlson. On that show she proclaimed that religion was under attack, "Women and children are being redesigned by some sort of mad leftist science experiment," and that her pronouns were "U.S.A."

In 2025, Faulkner was announced as the host of Fox's America’s Most Wanted: Missing Persons, a three-week series spinoff of America's Most Wanted.

== Awards and honors ==
While at ABC's St. Paul affiliate KSTP, Faulkner received four regional Emmy Awards, including Best Anchor three years in a row (2002, 2003, and 2004) and for anchoring a news special, "Eyewitness to War". In 1998, she was awarded the Amelia Earhart Pioneering Lifetime Achievement Award for her humanitarian efforts. In 2021, she was honored by Variety's 2021 New York Women's Impact Report for her 2020 interview with then-president Donald Trump after the murder of George Floyd.

In 2025, Southern University honored Faulkner as the first recipient of the Chancellor’s Award for Excellence and Lifetime Achievement.

== Personal life ==
Faulkner married former WCCO-TV reporter Tony Berlin in 2003. The couple have two daughters and have been residents of Edgewater, New Jersey.

In September 2015, Faulkner sued Hasbro for $5 million, claiming a plastic hamster in its Littlest Pet Shop line was an unauthorized use of her name and likeness. Hasbro settled with Faulkner in October 2016, agreeing to cease production of the toy.

== Published works ==
- Faulkner, Harris (November 1, 1999). Breaking News: God Has A Plan - An Anchorwoman's Journey Through Faith. Leawood, Kansas: Leather's Publishing. ISBN 9781585970117.
- Faulkner, Harris (June 5, 2018). 9 Rules of Engagement - A Military Brat's Guide to Life and Success. Harper Collins. ISBN 9780062697516.

== See also ==
- Broadcast journalism
- New Yorkers in journalism
