= King Kong (comics) =

Appearances of King Kong in comics publications

King Kong in comics

Publication information
- Publisher: Various
- Main character: King Kong

Creative team
- Created by: Various

Throughout the decades King Kong has been featured in numerous comic book publications from numerous publishers.

King Kong and his iconic battle with airplanes atop the Empire State Building. From the 1968 adaptation of King Kong, courtesy of Gold Key Comics. Cover art by George Wilson.

== RKO comic strips ==
In 1933, RKO (the studio that produced King Kong and The Son of Kong) created comic strips for each respective film in their pressbooks. These strips were published by newspapers across the country weeks leading up to each film's release as part of a pre-release publicity campaign and were illustrated by Glenn Cravath. When The Son of Kong strip was published in Spain, it featured additional artwork not seen in the American strip by Tomas Porto. These were published in Movies Celebs (Famous Movies) #12 by Editorial Swan in 1942.

== The King Kong Show ==
A mini-story (called "Kong Joins the Circus") which was based on the King Kong from The King Kong Show was published in the one-shot comic America's Best TV Comics by Marvel Comics in 1967.

In Japan, King Kong appeared in various Mangas that featured comic stories based on The King Kong Show which was produced in Japan by Toei. These issues were published throughout the show's run in that country and featured not only adaptations of various episodes but also original stories. These comics appeared in issues of Mangas published by Kodansha such as Shonen Magazine, the seasonal spinoff Bessatsu Shonen, and Bokura magazine. As well Hikari No Kuni Comics from Japan published a three volume comic magazine based on the series.

== Mexican King Kong comics ==
King Kong battles a gigantic strange-looking humanoid frog creature from issue #104 of the Mexican King Kong series, published by Editorial Orizaba.

The first comic series from Mexico that featured the character was a serial that was in the "Pepin" series by Editorial Juventud. The strip ran from #118 (May 26, 1938) to #136 (July 28, 1938). The heroes in the strip battle the evil Queen Zanya who plans on sacrificing the beautiful Luna to King Kong.

From 1965 to 1969 a Mexican comic company called Editorial Orizaba published a series based on King Kong. The series was published with fully painted color covers, but with sepia and white interior artwork. A new issue was published every Wednesday and the series would run 185 issues. In 1972 the series was reprinted (only 118 issues) by a company called Ediciones Joma.

In 1980 the series was reprinted yet again by a company called Ediciones Mexico. For these reprints the series was renamed The Gorilla (El Gorilla) for the first 15 issues before being renamed to The Gorilla of the Jungle (El Gorilla del la Selva) when a company called Nama took over publishing. The series ran to issue #131.

The next King Kong comic from Latin America was King Kong in the Microcosmos. The publisher of the series was Editorial America. It was published in 1979 and lasted roughly 35 issues. This comic was about a group of aliens who live in the Microcosmos that are facing a war on their planet. Searching for a warrior to help them in this war, they find a gorilla being chased by a group of hunters in the macro-world. They take the gorilla and some of the hunters to their planet. After reducing the gorilla and the others to enter their micro-world, they reversed the effects making the gorilla (now called King Kong) gigantic. Kong would help them win the war.

== Gold Key Comics ==
Gold Key Comics, a subsidiary of Western Publishing, published an adaptation in 1968, drawn by Alberto Giolitti and Alberto Giolitti with a cover painting by George Wilson (other credits are unknown), while Golden Press also released the comic (with the Whitman logo) as part of a treasury edition release. This oversized comic was commissioned by Merian C. Cooper and was based on the 1932 novelization by Delos W. Lovelace of which Cooper owned the copyright rather than the 1933 film. It was reprinted a few times upon the release of the 1976 remake, not just in the U.S by Golden Press, but other countries as well, translated into Dutch, German, Norwegian, and Swedish editions.

== King Kong the Robot ==
In 1964, the British comic company IPC Media created a character in the pages of Valiant Comics called Mytek the Mighty. This character was a giant robot ape that was built by a Professor Boyce. He appeared in various issues published by IPC well into the 1970s. When these comic strips were published in France from 1972–1974, the character's name was changed to King Kong the Robot. When the 32-issue comic was reprinted as various collections it was renamed Super King Kong.

== Monster Comics ==
Monster Comics, an imprint of Fantagraphics Books, produced a six-issue black and white comic book in 1991, adapted and illustrated by Don Simpson, and authorized by Merian C. Cooper's estate.

It is not, in fact, based on the 1933 film, but instead on the 1932 novelization by Delos W. Lovelace, and thus differs from the movie in numerous places. Notably, the ship is called the Vastator instead of the Venture and the characters of Charlie the Chinese cook and Second Mate Briggs are absent, replaced by a character from Lovelace's novel named Lumpy. The comic also contains several scenes not found in the film, including the infamous "spider pit" scenes and extra encounters with dinosaurs by the search party. Other notable changes include the addition of a character totally original to this comic, Denham's assistant Wally, and an extended sequence of several dinosaurs joining Kong in attacking the native village.

=== Issues ===
King Kong battles a Tyrannosaurus. From issue #3 of the comic book miniseries King Kong by Monster Comics.

- Part 1: Denham's Quest with cover by Dave Stevens.
  - Moviemaker Carl Denham hires a down-on-her-luck woman named Ann Darrow to be the star of his latest picture. During the voyage to their destination aboard the Vastator, Ann falls in love with first mate Jack Driscoll, and is given as a sacrifice to the god of Skull Island, a giant gorilla-like ape known as Kong. The cover by Stevens depicts Ann cupped in Kong's palm.
- Part 2: Kong's Island! with cover by Mark Schultz and Tom Luth.
  - Driscoll, Denham, and some of the Vastator's crew mount a rescue operation to save Ann. Instead, they find themselves fighting for their lives against Skull Island's population of fierce dinosaurs. The party fights heroically onward. Meanwhile, Kong battles a herd of dinosaurs, and then the search party catches up to him while crossing a log bridge over a chasm. The cover by Schultz and Luth shows Kong shaking the men off the log (even though this does not actually occur until the next issue).
- Part 3: Death in Devil's Chasm! with cover by William Stout.
  - Kong shakes most of the sailors off the log bridge and into the chasm, where they are eaten by a swarm of giant spiders. Kong's efforts to catch Driscoll are interrupted when Ann is attacked by a large meat-eating dinosaur, an Allosaurus. Kong fights and kills the dinosaur, then picks up Ann and moves on with Driscoll in pursuit. Denham, meanwhile, is sent back for reinforcements. Stout's cover shows Kong battling a Tyrannosaurus (when it is clearly an Allosaurus in the actual story).
- Part 4: Beauty and the Beast! with cover by William Stout.
  - Kong fights and kills a giant python en route to his lair atop Skull Mountain, then settles down to begin toying with his new "bride". He strips her of her clothes, leaving only her bra and panties, but is interrupted when a Pteranodon attacks. While Kong is busy with the pterosaur, Driscoll arrives and he and Ann escape together. The cover by Stout shows Kong's battle with the Pteranodon.
- Part 5: The Wrath of Kong with cover by Al Williamson, Mark Schultz, and Tom Luth.
  - Driscoll and Ann return to the native village, Denham and Captain Englehorn. Denham begins plotting to capture Kong alive, betting that he will come for Ann. He is proven right, as the giant gorilla, along with a swarm of dinosaurs, attacks the village. Kong and the other prehistoric beasts are brought down with a load of gas bombs, and Denham reveals his intention to take Kong back to New York. Possibly the oddest of all the covers, Williamson, Schultz, and Luth's cover shows Kong fighting with a Plesiosaurus. While this happened in the film, it not only does not occur in this issue, but is absent from the comic entirely.
- Part 6: The Eighth Wonder of the World with cover by Ken Steacy.
  - Kong is revealed to the public in chains, but soon escapes, recaptures Ann, and runs amok throughout New York. He ultimately climbs to the top of the Empire State Building where he does battle with a squadron of military biplanes. He loses the battle, and falls to his death from the skyscraper, and Driscoll and Ann are reunited once more. Steacy's cover shows Kong fighting with the biplanes and includes the notation "For Obie!"

== Dark Horse Comics ==
In the 1990s, Dark Horse Comics was publishing comics based on popular movie monsters such as Alien, Predator, Gamera, and Godzilla. They wanted to base comics on King Kong as well. There were plans on doing a comic adaptation of the 1933 film, as well as pitting King Kong against the Aliens, the Predators and even the Rocketeer (in a story written by Dave Stevens). Furthermore, there were plans on producing a Tarzan vs. King Kong (a.k.a. Tarzan on Skull Island) story as well, by Frank Cho, but the problems over the complicated and muddled rights to the King Kong character killed these plans. Comic book artist and King Kong fan Arthur Adams, lamented years later in an interview published in the book Comics Gone Ape by Michael Eury: "Well we talked about that. The rights were a horrible mess. Dark Horse couldn't find a way to do it. Someone held rights for the music, someone for the movie, someone for the story, and were ready to sue each other whenever anyone wanted to do anything with it".

The above book has various sketches from the planned Tarzan vs. King Kong project that never materialized. The most Dark Horse was able to do was feature King Kong in a one-page segment in the one-shot comic Urban Legends, published in 1993, that dispels the dual ending myth from the film King Kong vs. Godzilla.

In 2005, Dark Horse Comics and DH Press were able to strike a deal with Universal to license and produce tie-in comic books in connection with King Kong. This included King Kong: The 8th Wonder of the World, a direct comic book adaptation of the 2005 remake. This adaptation was planned to be a three-issue miniseries. While issue #1 was published, Dark Horse decided that instead to publish issues #2 and 3 on their own, they would publish them along with issue #1 again as a collected trade paperback in 2006. The art was done by Dustin Weaver and Dan Parsons, with colors by Michael Attiyeh, letters by Michael David Thomas, and cover by Weta Digital. They also published a mini-comic called Kong: The 8th Wonder of the World that was shipped with the various toys from the Playmates Toys toy line based on the film. As well, Dark Horse published a mini-comic called King Kong: The 8th Wonder of the World Special Edition that was packaged with the Target Corporation exclusive DVD release of the film in 2006.

They also were able to strike a deal with Joe DeVito a year earlier, to publish an illustrated novel (in both hardcover and softcover editions with differing cover art) called Kong: King of Skull Island. This story, by Joe DeVito, was an authorized sequel to the original King Kong story, commissioned by Merian C. Cooper's estate.

=== Kong: King of Skull Island ===
King Kong storms his way through the Skull Island jungle. From issue #3 of the comic book miniseries Kong: King of Skull Island by Markosia Comics.

Kong: King of Skull Island is an illustrated novel labeled as an authorized sequel to King Kong (1933) and was published in 2004 by DH Press, a subsidiary of Dark Horse Comics. A large-paperback edition was released in 2005. In 2011, it was released as an e-book for iPad. Authorized by the family and estate of Merian C. Cooper, the book was created and illustrated by Joe DeVito, written by Brad Strickland with John Michlig, and includes an introduction by Ray Harryhausen. The novel's story ignores the existence of The Son of Kong (1933) and continues the story of Skull Island with Carl Denham and Jack Driscoll in the late 1950s, through the novel's central character, Vincent Denham, Carl Denham's son (Ann Darrow does not appear, but is mentioned several times). The novel also becomes a prequel that reveals the story of the early history of Kong, of Skull Island, and of the natives of the island. On the novel's official website, it has stated that it would become a major motion picture. A six-issue comic adaptation of the novel was published by Markosia in 2007 that was eventually collected as a trade paperback in 2009.

An addition to the main storyline is the appearance of a new type of dinosaur species called the "deathrunners" by the natives. They are clearly evolved dromaeosaurs with an intelligence that easily surpasses that of the Venatosaurus. They are intelligent and crafty enough to create complex traps and plan strategies long beforehand. They "serve" a gigantic lone dromaeosaur named "Gaw", who was originally the beast that the Skull Islanders appeased with human sacrifices instead of Kong. She is a monstrous raptor-like theropod with some dragon-like features in her face and a flat, almost Godzilla-90's-like snout. One day, she went on a rampage and killed Kong's parents in a brutal fight, leaving him the last of his kind; the two titans grew up with a bitter hatred until Kong killed Gaw in battle and was then crowned "king" of the island, leading to the sacrifices to him currently.

== Boom! Studios ==
From July through December 2016, Boom! Studios published a six-issue series called Kong of Skull Island. Working with the Cooper estate and Joe DeVito's company, the series tells the origins of King Kong and the denizens of Skull Island. The series was extended, ultimately running 12 issues. In February 2017, Boom began reprinting the series as a three-volume trade paperback.

In October 2017, Boom! published a one-shot comic book titled Kong: Gods of Skull Island.

From November 2017 to April 2018, Boom! published a six-issue crossover series with Planet of the Apes called Kong on the Planet of the Apes. The series was collected as a trade paperback in October 2018.

In May 2018, a one-shot comic book was published called Kong of Skull Island 2018 Special #1. The story features Vikings landing on Skull Island.

== Legendary Comics ==
From April though November 2017, Legendary Comics published a four-issue miniseries based on the film Kong: Skull Island, called Skull Island: The Birth of Kong. In the miniseries, which acts as both a prequel and a sequel to the film, Kong's backstory and origins are revealed: his kind were killed eons ago in a brutal war with the reptilian monsters known as the Skullcrawlers when they invaded Skull Island. Kong's parents were the strongest and the last two of his race to survive, and during the final battle with the Skullcrawlers, Kong was born in the melee and sealed inside a cave to protect him by his mother. His parents died in the battle, leaving Kong an orphan and the last of his kind shortly after he was born. The series was collected as a trade paperback in December.

In April 2021, Legendary Comics released Kingdom Kong, a prequel to the film Godzilla vs. Kong. The story concerns Monarch's attempts to clear a path into Skull Island's Hollow Earth portal, while lingering remains of King Ghidorah's global superstorm from Godzilla: King of the Monsters begin to move dangerously close to Skull Island's barrier storm. Monarch discovers too late that the storm is being manipulated from within the Hollow Earth caverns by Camazotz, a bat-like Titan prophesied by the Iwi to engulf their world in darkness and challenge Kong for rule over the island. Though Kong is able to defeat Camazotz and drive him back into Hollow Earth, it is too late and Skull Island's storm has engulfed the island permanently, setting the stage for Godzilla vs. Kong.

In May 2021, Legendary Comics released Monsterverse Titanthology Vol 1. This collection reprints both the Skull Island: The Birth of Kong trade along with the Godzilla: Aftershock trade from 2019.

In October 2023, both Legendary Comics and DC Comics published a seven issue miniseries called Justice League vs. Godzilla vs. Kong which features King Kong and Godzilla battling heroes from the Justice League. To promote the series, both characters appeared on variant covers on other DC titles. Kong appeared on the variant covers for Detective Comics #1074, Batman and Robin #2, and Shazam! #4. The first two issues were reprinted as Justice League vs. Godzilla vs. Kong: Monster-Sized Edition #1 in March 2024. The full series was collected as a hardcover in September 2024. A sequel series was announced at the New York Comic Con called Justice League Vs Godzilla Vs Kong 2 for summer 2025. The 7 issue series was published from August 2025 through April 2026. It was collected as a hardcover in April 2026.

A graphic novel prequel to Godzilla x Kong: The New Empire called Godzilla x Kong: The Hunted was released in February 2024. The Kong side of the story follows Raymond Martin, a wealthy trophy hunter that poaches superspecies with the use of a mech suit. Having managed to gain access to Hollow Earth, he has his sights set on battling Kong, which proves to be his downfall.

Legendary Comics and Titan Comics teamed up to publish a 4 issue miniseries called Return to Skull Island which tied into the Netflix series Skull Island. The series ran from July through October 2025, and was collected as trade paperback in April 2026. A follow up 4 issue series called Escape from Skull Island was published from February through May 2026.

== Dynamite Comics ==
Devito partnered with Dynamite Entertainment to produce comic books and board games based on the property. The first was a six issue series called King Kong: The Great War which was published from May 2023 to September 2024. It was released as a trade paperback in February 2026.

== IDW Comics ==
From February through June 2026, IDW Publishing published a miniseries starring The Rocketeer called The Rocketeer: The Island. The series also featured King Kong.

== Other appearances ==
The hero Blue Devil battles a giant malfunctioning King Kong robot at the "King Kong Attraction" in Hollywood. From Blue Devil #15, published by DC Comics.

King Kong has appeared in other comic publications as well, whether it be cameos or in mini-comic strips/adaptations (most of these are foreign publications). He had a couple of cameos in both Marvel Comics and DC Comics. For Marvel, a giant robot ape called "Kong" appeared in Nick Fury, Agent of S.H.I.E.L.D. #2 in 1969, drawn to look exactly like the famous movie monster. The character Warlock from the New Mutants turned into Godzilla and then King Kong during a rampage through New York City in Web of Spider-Man Annual #2 from 1986. He makes a brief appearance in The Uncanny X-Men #349 in 1997 as a flashback when Maggott psychometrically recalls past events that occurred at the World Trade Center. In Webspinners: Tales of Spider-Man #1 from 1999, Peter Parker is seen watching the film King Kong at a cinema alongside Quentin Beck. He would return to watch the film again in #3. Kong was featured on the variant "Thor Goes Hollywood" cover for X-23 #9 in 2011. For DC, he appeared via a poster in 1961's Adventure Comics #289. In that comic's back-up strip called Tales of the Bizarro World, Bizarro encounters Titano the Super-Ape in Earth's prehistoric past. When he returns to his home world, he is inspired to make a TV series based on the character, only to be accused of ripping off King Kong. King Kong appeared as a statue in Superman's Girl Friend, Lois Lane #73 in 1967 and as a robot brought to life (among other giant robots in an amusement park created by the Toyman) to fight Superman in Adventures of Superman #475 in 1991. In issue #226 of Superman in 1970, titled When Superman became King Kong!, Clark Kent is seen watching the film King Kong at a Metropolis cinema. After being exposed to red kryptonite, Superman grows into a rampaging giant. In issue #120 of Weird War Tales from 1983, the G.I. Robot encounters a giant female ape referred to as "Mrs. King Kong" on Dinosaur Island, who saves him and his allies from a Tyrannosaurus. In 1985's Blue Devil #15, Blue Devil battles a giant robot King Kong that malfunctions at the "King Kong Attraction" at the Verner Bros. studio in Hollywood.

Outside of these major comic book companies, King Kong was featured in various smaller publications as well. In 1933, an adaptation of the original film was published in Spain in the magazine Bowling by Josep Alloza. That same year an adaptation appeared in issues #320-336 of Rin-tin-tin by Marco Publishing by Casals and Arlet. In 1951, in the free comic The Adventures of the FBI #57 (Rollán Publishing), an adaptation of The Son of Kong, called The Son of King Kong, was done by M. Gonzalez and L. Bermejo. Kong's son encountered the masked Mexican hero El Santo in issue #43 of the comic El Santo: The Man in the Silver Mask (Vol. 2) by Ediciones José G. Cruz in the 1960s and in #669 in 1973. He also appeared in short promotional comic strips promoting the King Kong banana- and toffee-flavored ice pops manufactured by Wall's in England in 1977/78. He was featured in a spoof story in issue #106 of Mad House from Archie Comics in 1977. He was featured in issue #41 of the Elvifrance comic series Green Series (Serie Verte) in an issue titled The Secret of King Kong. He was also featured in issue #6 of the Italian comic series Erotic Comic Selections, and in a one shot comic published by Komik Trijaya from Malaysia in 1978. He also appeared in issue #215 and #607 of the New Tintin (Nouveau Tintin) comic in 1979 and 1987 respectively. A comic strip adaptation of the original film appeared in issue #887 of the French magazine Pif gadget in 1986. Kong appeared in issue #487 of the Argentine comic book Lúpin. Avatar Press featured King Kong as a metaphor for Willis O'Brien in Cinema Purgatorio #4. In 1948 (from February to July), Edmond-François Calvo illustrated a King Kong comic strip in France that ran 13 issues, but this King Kong was just a regular-sized gorilla. In 1954, King Kong makes a brief cameo in the story "The Monster Maker" from Baffling Mysteries #15.

In Japan, King Kong was featured in a Japanese manga in 1947 that was illustrated by Osamu Tezuka and published under the "Red Book" banner by Fuji Shobo. A pair of manga adaptations of the 1976 remake were published: the first in the October and November issues of the boys magazine Monthly Shōnen Magazine, while the second was published in the December issue of Separate Volume TV Land by Daiji Ippune. In 1991, Shigeru Komatsuzaki illustrated a manga based on King Kong vs Godzilla that ultimately wasn't published until 2021, when it was released as a special commemorative "story book" with the TOHO 4K Ultra High Definition DVD release of the film. In 1996, both the 1933 film and King Kong vs. Godzilla were briefly featured in the hardcover manga about Eiji Tsuburaya's life called Eiji Tsuburaya: The Film Director Who Made Ultraman (円谷英二 : ウルトラマンをつくった映画監督). This book was published by Shogakukan. As a tie-in for the Japanese release of Godzilla x Kong: The New Empire, a four-page manga called Which is Stronger!? Godzilla x Kong (どっちが強い⁉ゴジラxコング Dotchi ga Tsuyoi!? Gojira Kongu) was released in movie theaters in Japan by Kadokawa as part of their Which is Stronger!? science series.

Outside of these cameos and one-shot appearances, King Kong has been spoofed and has influenced other giant apes in comics for many years.

== Publications ==
- Anthony Browne's King Kong (art and script by Anthony Browne, 92 pages, hardcover, 1994, ISBN 157036107X; 2005 reissue, softcover, 96 pages ISBN 0552553840)
- Kong: King of Skull Island (art and script by Joe DeVito with co-writers Brad Strickland and John Michlig, 160 pages, hardcover and softcover, 2004, ISBN 1-59582-006-X)
- King Kong: The 8th Wonder of the World (by Christian Gossett, with art by Dustin Weaver and Dave Dorman, 2005, trade paperback, 96 pages, 2006, ISBN 1-59307-472-7)
- Doc Savage: Skull Island (by Will Murray, 410 pages, softcover, 2013, ISBN 9781618271136)

== See also ==
- List of comics based on films
