= Mike Baker (CIA officer) =

American-British Central Intelligence Agency officer

- Born: Michael Baker; June 22, 1961 (age 65); Bideford, England
- Occupations: Script advisor, producer, former CIA officer, security consultant
- Espionage activity
- Allegiance: United States
- Service branch: Central Intelligence Agency (CIA)

Michael Baker is an American-British former Central Intelligence Agency officer and security expert, technical advisor for the entertainment industry, TV commentator, and host.

== Career ==
Baker spent approximately 15.5 years with the CIA, working as a covert field operations officer specializing in counterterrorism, counternarcotics and counterinsurgency operations. After this, he worked in the private sector as CEO of the business intelligence firm, Portman Square Group, and host of the President's Daily Brief.

He has worked as a technical advisor in the entertainment industry. Baker has appeared on Fox News' Red Eye w/ Tom Shillue, Deadliest Warrior, Spy, Opie & Anthony Show, The Joe Rogan Experience, and The Greg Gutfeld Show. He also hosts the television series Black Files Declassified on the Science Channel and Amazon Prime Video.

In 2022, Baker began hosting a Geopolitical news commentary podcast called "The Presidents Daily Brief", which covers geopolitics and national security related matters in the news, providing a roundup of the days events. The name refers to the President's Daily Brief in which the President of the United States is given intelligence updates each morning.
