= Red Eye (talk show) =

American late-night/early morning satirical talk show

- Title card for Red Eye
- Presented by: Greg Gutfeld (2007–2015); Tom Shillue (2015–2017)
- Starring: Andrew Levy; Rachel Marsden (2007); Bill Schulz (2007–2013); Joanne Nosuchinsky (2014–2016)
- Composers: Peter Brasino (theme and cues) (2015–2017)
- Country of origin: United States
- Original language: English
- No. of episodes: 1,853

Production
- Production location: New York City
- Camera setup: Multi-camera
- Running time: 60 minutes (approximately 44 minutes 30 seconds without commercials)

Original release
- Network: Fox News
- Release: February 6, 2007 – April 7, 2017

Red Eye (also known as Red Eye w/ Greg Gutfeld from 2007 to 2015 and Red Eye w/ Tom Shillue from 2015 to 2017) is an American late-night/early-morning satirical talk show on Fox News, which aired at 3:00 a.m. ET Tuesday through Saturday, 11:00 p.m. Saturday, and 2:00 a.m. Sunday. The show featured panelists and guests discussing the latest news in politics, pop culture, entertainment, business, sports, and religion.

The show was created and originally hosted by Greg Gutfeld, a self-described libertarian. Gutfeld hosted the show from February 2007 to March 2015, and was replaced by comedian Tom Shillue on June 22, 2015.

On April 3, 2017, Fox News announced that Red Eye had been canceled. The show's final episode aired on April 7.

== History ==
=== Assembling the panel ===
Andrew Levy discovered Gutfeld's writings on the Huffington Post and began leaving comments on Gutfeld's posts. As Levy's comments grew to include responses to other commenters, Levy "half-thought" the more outrageous comments were by Gutfeld himself. After discovering a post on Levy's blog on this theory, Gutfeld e-mailed Levy he did not write them, which began a correspondence between them. Gutfeld would eventually notify Levy about upcoming posts or ask him to look at his writing. Levy was also asked to join Gutfeld's new blog "The Daily Gut." Later Levy was asked by Gutfeld to join him in a new Fox News program.

Bill Schulz was an assistant editor at Stuff Magazine when Gutfeld was hired as editor in chief. Toronto Sun columnist Rachel Marsden was added later. Gutfeld remarked, "I think they just thought she would be a good kind of lightning rod."

=== Show's name ===
Red Eye was originally named Wasteland in its early testing stages. At one time, a series of video clips of this early version were available on the Fox News website. The original name, Wasteland, was selected because the show was about "a land of waste" and meaninglessness. The show was later renamed Red Eye because the original name was thought to be too negative and would repel viewers. The phrase "Red Eye" was chosen because the term was likely to resonate with viewers because it somehow captured the essence of the program. John Moody, Executive Vice President of News Editorial for Fox News, stated, "We want a word... that evokes what the show is." Shelly Stevenson, senior producer at Fox News said, "we wanted to come up with something that tipped its hat to the people we are serving." According to Moody, one of the producers, among the original target audiences were "slackers and losers," the "depressed, the dissatisfied, the depraved," "bloggers,” and those "age 18–40."

=== Legal issues ===
Following the first weeks of the program, the Chicago Tribune filed suit against News Corporation, the company that owns Fox News, alleging that the show's title could be confused with the Tribune's free commuter daily, RedEye, launched in 2002. Senior Vice President of Fox News John Moody proposed to U.S. District Judge Elaine Bucklo that Red Eye be blacked out from Chicago area viewers to prevent confusion with the Tribune's RedEye. In the event Fox News lost the case, Moody proposed cancelling Red Eye and reinstating reruns of Fox Report w/ Shepard Smith.

On April 4, Judge Bucklo denied the Tribune Co. injunction request. Bucklo stated that while the trademarks may be similar aurally, but not visually, Fox did not show intent to "pass off" Red Eye as a collaboration with the Tribune. Bucklo also noted a dissimilarity in content which "appear[ed] to include anything that strikes Gutfeld's interest." Discussion "rarely appear to last longer than a minute" and the format was "intended to be outrageous and funny." Bucklo also writes, "Animals and sexual topics dominate the discussions." Bucklo stated that "the only similarities between the products are the fact that both involve a media used to deliver news."

=== Rachel Marsden's departure ===
On May 30, 2007, regular Red Eye panelist Rachel Marsden was removed from the show and escorted out of the Red Eye offices by security guards, which Marsden alleged is standard procedure when a Fox employee is fired. On her blog, Marsden, said, "I will no longer be appearing on the show, as I have been told that it is heading in a 'different direction' from its inception and I am the 'first casualty.' As a political and news commentator, being a panelist on what had become a totally off-the-wall-and-into-orbit show was an interesting experience. It was also the first time that I was ever considered the 'sane one' on any program, so I am grateful for that unique opportunity and wish the boys the very best of luck." Her last appearance on the show was on May 30, 2007, after talking through the laughter of a Jeffrey Ross punchline.

=== Bill Schulz's departure ===
Former permanent panelist Bill Schulz's final appearance on Red Eye was on November 7, 2013; his departure (for undisclosed reasons) was officially announced on November 22. In 2016, Schulz confirmed that he was fired from the show but didn't disclose any details.

=== Podcast ===
On March 29, 2011, the first episode of the Red Eye podcast debuted. Usually, a new podcast episode was available every day. Most installments featured Gutfeld, Levy, and Schulz. In the event of an absence, Tom O'Connor, a Red Eye producer, filled in. Usual topics of discussion include what the cast does in the course of the day or weekend, news events, preparation for the show, and guests on that day's show. The podcast is currently offered in the YouTube video and MP3 audio format. With the start of The Five, the podcast was eventually discontinued, ending on August 22, 2011. A modified version which would become titled "Not LIVE! w/Lauren and Bill" debuted on April 4, 2012. Schulz and O'Connor were joined by Red Eye regular Lauren Sivan who appeared remotely from Los Angeles. After the departure of Schulz from Red Eye, the podcast was discontinued. The podcast ceased on October 17, 2013. The podcast resumed on April 12, 2016, taking a slightly different format. It usually features three or four cast members from the show, but they typically discuss more random comedic personal topics and rarely cover news or current events. The audio quality routinely suffers from excess noise generated by buttons worn by the co-hosts.

=== Joanne Nosuchinsky ===
On February 4, 2014, Miss New York USA 2013 Joanne Nosuchinsky was announced as the new permanent panelist (ostensibly to replace Schulz). She had been a frequent guest on the show since her first appearance on September 18, 2013. On the Red Eye w/ Tom Shillue broadcast at 12 a.m. on August 5, 2016, Nosuchinsky stated that after two and half years at Fox News, she would be leaving the network. On the August 6, 2016 broadcast of Red Eye, her last, Nosuchinsky stated that she was leaving Fox News to pursue an acting career.

=== Greg Gutfeld's departure ===
On his last show on February 28, 2015, Greg Gutfeld announced that he was leaving Red Eye after eight years to host a new weekend program for Fox News.

== Production ==
While the show aired at 3 a.m. ET, it was actually taped at around 8 p.m. the previous night. Gutfeld once joked, "We wouldn't be able to survive after three months because we'd all become raging alcoholics if we had to stay up until 3 a.m.!"

== Episode structure ==
The show features a round table of panelists, as well as guests linked by satellite. Tom Shillue, with advisory from Andy Levy, writes the daily content. The show begins with Shillue's introduction of his guests, which include flattering, exaggerated comparisons about each of them. These guest introductions are sometimes submitted by fans on Twitter. Other non-traditional characteristics of the show include the use of offbeat imagery, often obscure popular videos featuring animals, especially cats, during certain segments. Levy, referred to as "TV's Andy Levy" or "TV's Very Own Andy Levy," acts as the show's ombudsman, appearing in the "Halftime Report w/ Andy Levy."

=== Greg Gutfeld version ===
Block	Standard Content
A	'Pregame Report', "A Block, the Lede, that's the first story."
B	One or more of the following: Recurring Segment/Discussion
C	One or more of the following: 'Halftime Report w/ Andy Levy'/'Lightning Round'/Recurring Segment/Discussion
D	One or more of the following: Discussion/Guest Interview
E	One or more of the following: E Block, last story, that's the last story.
F	'Postgame Wrap-Up/Post Game Report

=== Tom Shillue version ===
Block	Standard Content
A	The Most Important Story of the Day. Oxymoronically, this is often a "weird news" item that is featured primarily for its comedic value.
B	A Moment with Tom. Shillue's main monologue, followed by discussion.
C	Halftime Report with TV's Andy Levy. In his capacity as the show's ombudsman, Levy offers additional jokes and engagement with the evening's panel.
D	Another story or a THFTP segment.
E	Tom's Bedtime Story. Shillue attempts (humorously) to relate a final news item to his childhood experiences.

== Controversies ==
=== Apology to Canadians ===
In a five-minute segment broadcast on Tuesday, March 17, 2009, Gutfeld and his panel discussed Canadian Lieutenant General Andrew Leslie's statement that the Canadian Armed Forces may require a one-year "synchronized break" once Canada's mission in Afghanistan ends in 2011. "Meaning, the Canadian military wants to take a breather to do some yoga, paint landscapes, run on the beach in gorgeous white Capri pants," Gutfeld said. "I didn't even know they were in the war", comedian panelist Doug Benson added, then continued, "I thought that's where you go if you don't want to fight. Go chill in Canada." Gutfeld also said: "Isn't this the perfect time to invade this ridiculous country? They have no army!" Schulz made comments about the Royal Canadian Mounted Police and their ceremonial red uniforms, and concluded by saying "This is not a smart culture!"

The segment drew wide attention and outrage in Canada after being posted on YouTube following the reported deaths of four Canadian soldiers in Afghanistan three days earlier. Canada, at the time, had been in command of the NATO mission in the Kandahar Province, the birthplace and former Taliban capital, for the past three years. Along with the Helmand Province, the two provinces were "home to some of the fiercest opposition to coalition forces" and reported to "have the highest casualty rates per province."

Canadian Defence Minister Peter MacKay called on Fox to apologize for the satirical comments, describing the remarks as "despicable, hurtful and ignorant." Gutfeld, in response, maintained the show is satirical and irreverent but offered the following apology: "The March 17 episode of Red Eye included a segment discussing Canada's plan for a 'synchronized break,' which was in no way an attempt to make light of troop efforts. However, I realize that my words may have been misunderstood. It was not my intent to disrespect the brave men, women and families of the Canadian military, and for that I apologize."

Doug Benson was scheduled to appear in Canada at Edmonton's The Comic Strip April 3–5, 2009, but the shows were canceled after the owner received threats of "bodily injury" toward the American comic. "Some were saying he wouldn't make it from the airport to the club. For everyone's safety, we decided it was best to avoid the scenario altogether," manager Rick Bronson said. Benson also offered an apology following the incident on CTV News. The comedian stated that he was "ignorant about the situation in Afghanistan" and that the timing of the jokes were "completely out of line". "I honestly said things, in retrospect, I completely regret" said Benson and has vowed to "never appear on the show again".

== Guest hosts/panelists ==
Guest Hosts

- Mike Baker
- Andrew Breitbart
- Michelle Collins
- Steven Crowder
- Jill Dobson
- Kennedy
- Bill Schulz
- Dave Brockie
- Mike Huckabee
- Griff Jenkins
- Brian Kilmeade
- Gavin McInnes
- Nick Mullen
- Andy Levy
- Joanne Nosuchinsky
- Jim Norton
- Dana Perino
- Tom Shillue
- Sherrod Small
- Jedediah Bila
- Kat Timpf
- Amy Schumer

Guest Halftime Reporters

- Mike Baker
- Jedediah Bila
- Dan Bova
- Patti Ann Browne
- Michelle Collins
- Charles C. W. Cooke
- S. E. Cupp
- Joe DeRosa
- Joe DeVito
- John DeVore
- Ron Geraci
- Griff Jenkins
- Jesse Joyce
- Gavin McInnes
- Paul Mecurio
- Michael C. Moynihan
- Dana Perino
- Michael Malice
- Tom Shillue
- Lauren Simonetti
- Sherrod Small
- Remi Spencer
- Andrea Tantaros
- Dana Vachon

== Ratings ==
Information about Red Eye's Nielsen ratings is sparse. In March 2007, when the show was still airing at 2:00 a.m. ET, Red Eye averaged 309,000 viewers in its time slot, down about 9 percent from March 2006 when another show aired in that same time slot. In the age 25–54 demographic, however, the show was up 15 percent from the prior year. In March 2006, the 2:00–3:00 a.m. time slot averaged 134,000 demo viewers; in March 2007, it was 154,000. In the 18–34 demo, the time slot was up 27 percent, from 33,000 to 42,000.

After the show moved to its 3:00 a.m. ET time slot in October 2007, Red Eye's ratings decreased. As of the show's one-year anniversary, average viewership dipped 15 percent, to 285,000. The 25–54 demo was down 24 percent, to 123,000. The show's second anniversary episode on February 5, 2009, however, showed significant improvement: Red Eye averaged 390,000 viewers, with 166,000 in the 25–54 demo. Nielsen also found that in March 2008, 6.1 percent of Red Eye's total viewership came from those who recorded the show, as opposed to watching it when it aired.

In July 2009, Red Eye averaged 335,000 viewers, with 135,000 in the demo. In September 2009, Red Eye averaged 433,000 viewers, with 203,000 in the demo. In 2009, Red Eye was the 40th-highest rated cable news program, in terms of average total viewers. It averaged 365,000 viewers, with 163,000 in the demo. From February 1–5, 2010, the week of the show's third anniversary, Red Eye again averaged 433,000 viewers, with 180,000 in the demo.

By its 1,000th show, Red Eye averaged 365,000 viewers, with 185,000 in the 25–54 demographic, up 17 percent over 2010 in total viewers and up 13 percent in the demo. In October 2011, the show averaged the largest audience in its history. In the key 25 to 54 age demographic, it beat CNN's Piers Morgan Tonight, Erin Burnett Outfront, John King, USA; MSNBC's Morning Joe and Hardball With Chris Matthews; and HLN's Nancy Grace.

On August 17, 2013, Red Eye celebrated its 1,500th episode. That month, the show averaged 434,000 viewers, with 158,000 in the demo. Despite its 3:00 a.m. ET timeslot, it beat all but two of MSNBC's shows in the demo, and its overall viewership was just behind All In with Chris Hayes and Piers Morgan Live, which air on MSNBC at 8:00 p.m. and on CNN at 9:00 p.m., respectively.

For the month of January 2014, Red Eye averaged 488,000 total viewers a night and 195,000 viewers in the key 25 to 54 viewing demographic.

In February 2015, Red Eye averaged 339,000 total viewers, with 137,000 in the demo.

== See also ==
- Gutfeld!
- The 1/2 Hour News Hour

Preceded by On the Record w/ Greta Van Susteren (Replay)	Red Eye; 3 a.m. ET – 4 a.m. ET	Succeeded by The Five (Replay)
