= Space Family Robinson =

Science fiction comic-book series

Space Family Robinson #1 (Dec, 1962). Gold Key Comics. Art by George Wilson.

Space Family Robinson was an original science-fiction comic-book series published by Gold Key Comics. It predates the Lost in Space television series. Both are loosely based on the 1812 novel by Johann David Wyss (and similarly named movies) The Swiss Family Robinson.

== Publication history ==
Space Family Robinson was published as a total of 59 issues, from 1962 to 1982. The first issue was published in December 1962.

In 1965, when Irwin Allen produced the primetime television show Lost in Space, Gold Key's publishers noticed the similarities between the comic books and the show. They considered filing suit, but decided against it, as Gold Key was also publishing an Irwin Allen title, Voyage to the Bottom of the Sea. The two companies reached an agreement that the comic could change its cover title to Space Family Robinson: Lost in Space. The new title appeared starting with issue #15 (Jan 1966).

The comic book was cancelled with #36 (October, 1969). It was brought back in October, 1973, in part due to the popularity of Star Trek. At this point, all issues between #37 and #44 had the tag "On Space Station One". The title was cancelled again with #54 (December, 1977) (with #49 being a reprint of #38). A further new story was published in Gold Key Champion #1 (1978). In 1981, the title was revived as a reprint title for issues #55–59 (1981–1982) under the "Whitman Comics" line. New stories also appeared in March of Comics #320, 328, and 352.

A backup series, titled Captain Venture and the Land Beneath the Sea, ran through issues #6-36 (1964–1969). Gold Key published two reprint issues in 1968 and 1969.

In August 2011, Dark Horse Comics began the Space Family Robinson archives hardcover reprint series. Volume 1 collects Space Family Robinson #1–7; Volume 2 collects Space Family Robinson #8–14; Volume 3 collects Space Family Robinson #15–22; Volume 4 collects Space Family Robinson Lost in Space #23–31 and March of Comics #320; and Volume 5 collects Space Family Robinson Lost in Space #32-40 and March of Comics #328.

== Overview ==
The Overstreet Comic Book Price Guide suggested the series was created by famed Disney comic-book artist-writer Carl Barks. In fact, Barks did suggest a Swiss Family Robinson in space comic to his editor Chase Craig circa 1960, but nothing came of it. The subsequent series was originated by people who had not heard of Barks' idea, which would have been more adventure-oriented.

The comic was created by writer Del Connell and artist Dan Spiegle. Gaylord DuBois became the sole writer of Space Family Robinson once he began chronicling the Robinsons' adventures with "Peril on Planet Four" in issue #8. He had already begun the Captain Venture second feature, beginning with "Situation Survival" in issue #6. As was typical of Gold Key's adventure comics, all cover art was painted, usually by George Wilson.

In the comic, the Robinsons were scientist father Craig, scientist mother June, early teenagers Tim (their son) and Tam (their daughter), along with pets Clancy (a dog) and Yakker (parrot). They lived in Space Station One, a spacious moving craft with hydroponic gardens, observatory, and two small Spacemobile shuttle craft. The family was selected by computer to be the most mentally and physically qualified to man the space station. They had left Earth in 2001. In the second issue, a cosmic storm deposited them far from Earth. The Robinsons' adventures continue as they try to work their way home.

== In media ==
A Space Station #1 fan mail reply in issue #18 of the comic book Space Family Robinson states, "The Robinsons lived in Woodland Hills, a suburb of Los Angeles, California. Craig and June worked as scientists in space technology laboratories in the area before being selected to command Space Station #1."

== Space Family Robinson in Lady Penelope ==
In 1966, the weekly UK publication Lady Penelope ("the comic for girls who love television"; published by City Magazines) printed Space Family Robinson stories. These used the same characters and technology as the Gold Key titles, but were original stories. The author of these stories is not known; they may have been written by Brian Woodford, a subeditor on the publication. The artist was John M. Burns.

The 52 weekly installments, printed in black and white, told six stories:

1. The Robinson family begin their mission and become lost when an explosion sends them far off course. This is the only story based on the Gold Key comic books.
2. Unwittingly, they become involved in a war between two planets.
3. The Robinsons meet telepathic tripods whilst searching for materials to repair the station's power source.
4. Tim and Tam are sent on a quest by aliens with the ability to restructure matter with their thoughts.
5. An alien claims the Robinsons must pay a tax for traveling through his space, and demands Tam as payment.
6. The Robinsons land on a duplicate of Earth, which they mistake for home.

All six stories were reprinted in the Dutch comic TV2000.

The Lady Penelope Summer Extra (1966) included a three-page story in which the Robinsons land on a recently abandoned planet. They discover that the hasty exodus was due to the approach of a massive gravity source. This story was reprinted in the TV2000 Thunderbirds Extra (1966) with the third page coloured by the Dutch publishers.

A story included in Lady Penelope Annual for 1966, "Tam Meets The Trygans", told how Tam returns to the station only to find it occupied by aliens intent on stealing it. This is the only story printed in colour throughout, the only story with a title, and the only one not drawn by John Burns. The artist has not yet been identified.

== Musical ==
Though unrelated to the original characters, a new musical was produced in London in 2002 entitled Space Family Robinson. Here, a man takes his family away from a planet Earth which is destroyed by aliens, only to discover that he has been rescued by a former girlfriend who wants revenge. The show was written by Julian Butler, with songs by Julian and Stephen Butler. It played at the Pleasance Theatre in London between 4 May and 26 May 2002, featuring well-known musical star Hannah Waddingham in the lead role of Starbird, as well as Laurie Hagen, Tim Barron, Helena Biggs, Stuart Piper, and Arvid Larsen. The production was directed by Oliver Campbell-Smith. Although moderately successful (a soundtrack CD was produced) the production has not been revived since.
