= Lindsay Moran =

CIA officer & writer (born 1969)

Lindsay Moran (born 18 December 1969) is a former clandestine officer for the Central Intelligence Agency. She is a freelance writer whose articles have appeared in The New York Times, The Washington Post, and USA Today. In 2005, she published her memoir Blowing My Cover, My Life As A Spy, in which she wrote about her experiences as a case officer from 1998 to 2003.

== Early years ==
Lindsay Moran had an interest in everything espionage related from her early years on. Her childhood fantasies were fueled by spy novels, especially "Harriet the Spy" and the James Bond series, and she dreamed of growing up to join the CIA. A member of Montgomery Blair High School's graduating class of 1987, she was a staff writer and editor-in-chief of Silver Chips. After high school, she attended Harvard College majoring in English.

After graduating from Harvard, she won a Fulbright scholarship and then became an English teacher in Bulgaria.

== CIA career ==
After graduating from Harvard and submitting an application that included her language skills and her time living in Eastern Europe as a Fulbright scholar, Moran was recruited to work for the CIA.

She began her orientation in the Directorate of Operations (DO), the clandestine branch of the Agency, after which she was sent to "The Farm", the field academy for clandestine officers at a base outside Williamsburg, Virginia. Her year of training included paramilitary exercises, mock ambushes, parachute jumps, car crashes, and driving power boats. It also included an exercise in which students at a pretend embassy reception sought to recruit "foreigners" to spy for the CIA. She completed the training course in December 1999, a year after the CIA's director George Tenet declared war on al-Qaeda.

After graduating from "The Farm", Moran was deployed to Skopje, Republic of Macedonia under the official cover of a foreign diplomat. As a case officer for the CIA, Moran's primary job was to spot, assess, develop, and recruit foreigners willing to sell secrets, as well as maintaining the agents who were already under her control. She spent three years there collecting information on Yugoslavian leaders involved in the Serbian war in Kosovo. However, her interest in spy work gradually diminished because of the pressure her career had put on her personal life, as well as her growing disillusionment with the CIA's bureaucracy, especially after the September 11, 2001 attacks. On the Diane Rehm talk radio show on January 17, 2005, Moran said that the final straw that convinced her to leave the agency was its slow reaction to the terrorist attacks. She was also disappointed with the agency itself since she felt that her career advancement as a case officer, in general, depended not so much on the quality of agents that she recruited, but rather on the quantity. The more recruits they had, the better. Disapproving of the Iraq War, she worked on the Iraq desk at headquarters during the Iraq invasion and resigned from the CIA after five years there.

== Memoir ==
In 2005, Moran published her memoir Blowing My Cover: My Life as a Spy detailing her time in the CIA. Some find it surprising that the CIA allowed Moran to speak freely about her top-secret work, especially due to the negative press this book generated for the Agency. Moran responded in an interview:

It's not a threat to write a book about a dysfunctional intelligence organization. It's a threat to have a dysfunctional intelligence organization, and that was my ultimate conclusion.

== See also ==
- Philip Agee
- Frank Snepp
- John Stockwell
- Melvin Goodman
- Ray McGovern
- Ralph McGehee
- David MacMichael
- Robert Baer
- The Recruit
- Spy (BBC)
- Valerie Plame
