= Andrew Levy =

American commentator and humorist (born 1966)

- Born: Andrew L. Levy; 1966 (age 59–60); Long Island, New York, US
- Other name: Andy Levy
- Education: Columbia University (BA)
- Occupations: Writer, television personality, commentator, humorist, producer, publicist
- Employer(s): Daily Beast HLN (TV network); Fox News Directors Guild of America
- Known for: Red Eye

Andrew (Andy) L. Levy (born 1966) is an American commentator and humorist.

== Early life and education ==
Levy grew up in Long Island, New York. He attended Columbia University, where he was a member of the fraternity St. Anthony Hall and co-founded a newspaper, The Fed, with Neil Gorsuch and P. T. Waters. The Fed was a response to campus liberals. "It had no campus visibility. It was sort of like shouting into the wind," Levy said.

Eleven credits short of his degree, Levy served in the U.S. Army from 1990 to 1993 as a combat signaler. He was motivated to enlist for Operation Desert Storm. However, Levy spent a year in the Korean Demilitarized Zone and also served at Fort Lewis in Tacoma, Washington.

After he left the army, Levy returned to Columbia University and completed his B.A. in political science.

== Career ==
After college, Levy received a grant for a year-long internship at NBC News in Washington, D.C. After the internship was over, he was hired by NBC and worked there for two years. Levy enjoyed the job and coworkers, but did not like Washington, D.C., and politics.

He moved to Los Angeles for ten years. While there, Levy was the publicist for the Academy Awards for five months. He then worked for six years as the deputy communications director with the Directors Guild of America.

For three years, Levy played keyboards in the band Dalton Grant, based in Los Angeles. He was also in a cover band, Suite 69, fronted by Dalton Grant bass player Aaron Britt and that included Dalton Grant drummer Joey Ponchetti.

In addition, Levy blogged as the Cranky Insomniac.

=== Red Eye ===
Beginning on February 7, 2007, Levy appeared on Red Eye, the Fox News Channel late night talk show hosted by Greg Gutfeld. Levy served as the show's ombudsman—a fact-checking libertarian who came out for the "Halftime Report" and the "Postgame Wrap-up" to tell the panel what they got wrong and what they missed talking about. Levy also did fake news reports and later became a regular panelist and co-host on the show. He was referred to as "TV's Andy Levy" and was known for his deadpan delivery and a catch-phase "I apologize for nothing."

"When the show first started, there wasn't anyone more uncomfortable in front of a camera than I was," Levy said. "And I mean in the 400-year history of television. My hands were literally shaking every time I was on air."

Red Eye ended in April 2017. However, Levy continued to work at Fox News.

=== Unfiltered ===
In August 2017, Levy joined S.E. Cupp's Unfiltered on HLN as a panelist and senior producer. He left when the show changed its format after a move to CNN in 2018.

=== The New Abnormal ===
In 2021, Levy joined The Daily Beast podcast, The New Abnormal, as a co-host with Molly Jong-Fast.

== Twitter wars ==
In 2011, Levy was involved in a Twitter war with Chris Brown. When somewhat forced to make an apology to Brown, he chose the platform of Red Eye. Levy said:

I'd like to apologize to Chris Brown and to his fans, who are known as Team Breezy. To Mr. Brown, I apologize for referencing the fact that you beat the crap out of Rihanna. It was disrespectful of me to draw attention to the fact that you put your girlfriend in the hospital. And further, it was not my place to make people remember that you beat a woman with your fists, leaving her with multiple facial contusions, a bloody nose, and a split lip. ... To Team Breezy, thank you for your thousands of tweets which taught me about the creative possibilities of spelling, grammar, and syntax. ... In particular, I'd like to thank the female members of Team Breezy, who have taught me that as long as you can sing, you can beat the living hell out of a woman and other women will still love you. And lastly, I apologize to everyone for using Twitter to subtly address the fact it's disgusting that a guy who put his girlfriend in a hospital can, a mere two years later, be warmly welcomed back into society and appear on shows such as Saturday Night Live as if everything he did magically never happened.

Levy also engaged in a minor Twitter war with Adam Levine in 2011 after the latter posted his request that Fox News stop using his music. Levy replied in the same format as Levine's original post, saying, "Dear @AdamLevine, don't make crappy f-king music ever again. Thank you."

Levy took a seven-month hiatus from Twitter in 2018. He says, "Twitter was fun at one point. ... Once it hit a critical mass of people it just started sucking."

== Personal life ==
Levy is a libertarian and occasionally takes positions that differ from conservatives and Republicans. In 2011, he defended liberal comedian and television host Bill Maher. In 2016, he said that conservatives "shouldn’t be so quick to dismiss the African American community’s frustration" with the #OscarsSoWhite campaign. That same year after Michelle Obama made a speech he wrote, "Seriously republicans are very lucky Michelle Obama says she has no interest in running for office." In the introduction of his podcast, The New Abnormal, Levy states "I'm a former libertarian who now sits pretty comfortably on the left."

Levy has also been described as a "level-headed Trump skeptic" who is "comfortable calling out the president on his numerous mistakes." In 2017, Levy took on his former employer Fox News and President Donald Trump, saying, "Fox News…have backed themselves into this corner, and now they're the Trump News Network and that's their lifeblood." He continued, "The press is not supposed to be on the side of people in power ever. The press is supposed to be adversarial, the press is supposed to question, the press is not supposed to curry favor with authority."

Levy has two cats, Pixel and Stormy. He has never been married. He has said, "Living your life in public is distasteful to me."
