= Julie Banderas =

American television news anchor (born 1973)

- Born: Julie E. Bidwell; September 25, 1973 (age 52)
- Other names: Julie Bidwell-Sansone
- Education: Emerson College
- Occupation: Television news anchor
- Employer: Fox News
- Spouse: Andrew Sansone (m. 2009; div. 2023)
- Children: 3

Julie Banderas (born Julie Bidwell, September 25, 1973 (Note: Banderas' birthday is September 25. She was thirty-five years old on August 28, 2009. Her full birthday, September 25, 1973, is calculated from these two facts.)) is an American television news anchor for Fox News. She hosted Fox Report Weekend before moving to a weekday anchor role, and currently serves as a primary weekday fill-in anchor on programs such as America's Newsroom, The Faulkner Focus, and Outnumbered. She is also a regular guest host on The Big Weekend Show and a frequent guest on Gutfeld!.

== Early life and education ==
Banderas is the daughter of Fabiola Rodriguez and Howard Dexter Bidwell (1930–2010). Her mother is an immigrant from Colombia; her father was a Navy veteran and civil engineer who started a company called Consolidated Precast, Inc. Banderas has a sister and four half siblings from her father's first marriage. She graduated with a bachelor's degree from Emerson College.

== Career ==
Banderas began her career at WLVI-TV in Boston. She went on to serve as a local news anchorwoman for WHSV-TV in Harrisonburg, Virginia; WBRE-TV in Wilkes-Barre, Pennsylvania; WFSB-TV in Hartford, Connecticut and WNYW in New York City.

She joined Fox News in March 2005 as a general-assignment reporter.

In 2008, she replaced Laurie Dhue as the anchor for Fox Report Weekend. In 2010, she took maternity leave with Harris Faulkner assuming her responsibilities. She returned to Fox News from leave near the end of 2010 and was reassigned to the position of general news correspondent.

In June 2006, she gained international media attention for an on-air clash with Shirley Phelps-Roper, former spokeswoman for the Westboro Baptist Church, about which she later stated, "These people should be arrested, and I understand the right to protest, but when you disgrace not only our fallen soldiers, but when you disgrace innocent young children, I swear. Lock 'em up. Throw away the key. Give 'em the death penalty. I think it's disgusting."

== Personal life ==
Banderas' ex-husband Andrew J. Sansone, a member of the board of directors of Habitat for Humanity and founding president of both Old Rock Media and Big Apple Channel, proposed marriage to her with a message-in-a-bottle that he pretended to discover on the beach while clam digging on Long Island Sound. She announced their engagement during an episode of America's Election Headquarters on September 21, 2008. They wed at Fifth Avenue Presbyterian Church on August 29, 2009. They have three children and reside in New York City.

In December 2022, Banderas announced on her Twitter account that she and Sansone had separated. On February 9, 2023, Banderas announced on Fox's Gutfeld! that she was getting a divorce.

== See also ==
- New Yorkers in journalism
