= The Fed (newspaper) =

Student newspaper at Columbia University

The Federalist
- Categories: Humor
- Frequency: Tri-Semesterly
- Circulation: 5,000
- First issue: October 1986
- Country: United States
- Language: English
- Website: columbiafederalist.com

The Federalist, known colloquially among students as The Fed, is a tabloid-sized newspaper published every three weeks at Columbia University in New York City. Founded in 1986 by Neil Gorsuch, Andrew Levy and P.T. Waters, the paper has undergone many changes in mission, style, form, and success, though it has experienced relatively few interruptions in production since the publication of its first issues. Currently the paper publishes topical humor and satirical content.

== History ==
=== 1986–1989 ===
The early Fed carried the full "Federalist Paper" masthead and advertised itself as "a newspaper in the tradition of Columbians Hamilton and Jay." The founding members were "a libertarian, conservative, and a socialist, (although no one knows which was which)."

The founders were Andy Levy (likely the libertarian), Neil Gorsuch (likely the conservative), and P.T. Waters. The paper's mission was to create a "classically liberal" forum with content centered primarily on issues and news topics considered "politically delicate" at Columbia, such as race relations, discussions as to Barnard's place in the newly co-ed institution, and whether anyone at the school actually listened to the student radio station WKCR.

The political and cultural tone of Columbia in the mid to late '80s was still very much oriented toward the free speech protest movements of the late '60s, and the associated far left politics dominated campus political culture. This left room for more student publication focused on opinions from the right of the political spectrum. As early as the first few issues, the paper referred to itself as "the Fed" and wrote editorials in an informal, personal style.

=== 1990–1992 ===
By 1990, The Federalist Paper was already feeling the pinch of low content. Issues from the era display an increasing disregard for layout and copy-editing (a charge often leveled at the paper regardless of the format), a decline in advertising from former stalwarts such as Coors and Kaplan, and an editorial board that drew almost exclusively conservative commentators. The board of 1992, after a fierce debate, recommitted itself to the "classically liberal" stance of the founders and began a charge towards diversity of opinions.

=== 1992–1996 ===
During this period, the paper gained the reputation it still upholds today as the leading informational publication at Columbia. It also retained its re-affirmed mandate of providing a forum for diverging view-points, consistent with its classically liberal worldview. Later, some members of the Federalist's editorial staff would deride this period in the paper's history, such as former Editor-in-Chief Laurie Marhoefer, who suggested that the paper declined in these years under pressure from other campus competitors, including the then-progressive Spectator and the socialist-sponsored Modern Times (long-since defunct).

=== 1996–1998 ===
Mirroring Columbia's own campaign to upgrade its image, editor-in-chief Marc Doussard organized a massive layout overhaul and placed an increased emphasis on local social commentary. "They Watch," a regular feature, began running on Page 12. Topics ranged from sex to alcoholism to grade inflation. Readership of the paper increased drastically.

However, the paper's staff became increasingly insular, refusing to recruit members as older staffers graduated. By Fall 1997, the staff dwindled to two editors, who produced only one large issue. As the spring semester of 1998 opened, their layout computer crashed, taking with it all records and templates. The Federalist Paper was finished.

=== 1999–2003 ===
In the fall of 1998, a few readers of the older Federalist elected to restart the paper, committing to the same peculiar blend of viewpoints, with a focus on the humor and absurdism that made the previous incarnation appealing to the student body. After a few false starts (no one on the staff had any experience in laying out a newspaper, and as such the initial issues were printed in an oversized font) and an anonymous donation, The Fed began to produce regular content.

=== 2004 ===
In February 2004, The Fed published a cartoon from the ongoing series "Whacky Fun Whitey" entitled "Blacky Fun Whitey." Columbia was already experiencing racial tensions on campus, after the Conservative Club authorized an "Affirmative Action Bake Sale" where items were sold at various prices depending on a person's race, gender, or political affiliation. Many took the cartoon to be demeaning to African-Americans and the concept of Black History Month, and coming after the events of the previous weeks, it was the last straw. Students formed groups calling for immediate action and multicultural awareness, alleging an insidious culture of discrimination was growing from ignorance at Columbia.

Readership began to decline over the next two years, with many deserting for publications such as the Blue and White. The paper was criticized for a lack of content and its increasingly dated design.

=== 2006–2014 ===
The 2006–2007 academic year marked The Fed's 21st anniversary. It opened with a new layout design and included non-fictional material. Interviews with subjects such as Jon Voight, Don Imus and Steve Wozniak resulted in positive responses. Stand-alone comics such as the "Prez-Bo" also turned heads, and a large recruitment effort brought a bumper crop of new artists – making projects such as 22.2's full-page collaborative cover illustration possible. The humor content also steadily improved, with new articles emphasizing topical subjects such as the 2008 election.

== Colombia Spectador ==
Every year on April 1 since 2001, The Fed publishes an issue with identical specifications to the Columbia Daily Spectator under the pseudonym “The Colombia Spectador.” It is placed in Spectator news racks around campus in order to fool unsuspecting readers into picking it up instead of the day's Spectator. Notably, the Spectador has convinced readers that Malia Obama was attending Barnard College in 2016, that Dean James Valentini was leaving the University for a position at NYU in 2022, and that Greta Gerwig would act as the commencement speaker for the class of 2024.

== Notable Fed alumni ==
- Neil Gorsuch, Associate Justice of the Supreme Court.
- Andrew Levy, ombudsman and contributor to Fox News Channel's late-night show Red Eye.
