= Greg Gutfeld =

American commentator (born 1964)

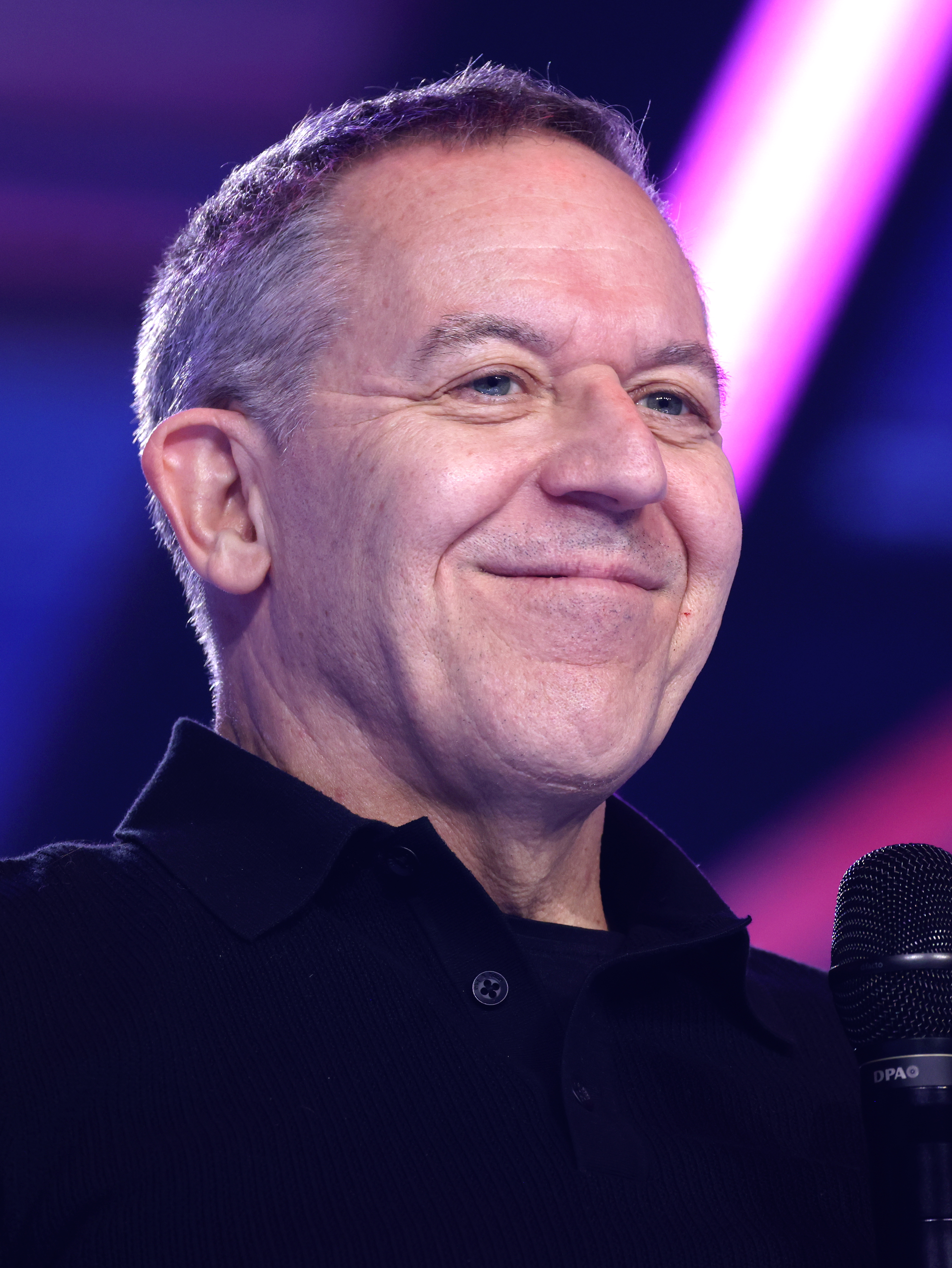
- Gutfeld in 2025
- Born: Gregory John Gutfeld; September 12, 1964 (age 62); San Mateo, California, U.S.
- Education: University of California, Berkeley (BA)
- Occupations: Television personality; political commentator; comedian; author
- Employer: Fox News
- Television: Gutfeld!; The Five; Red Eye w/ Greg Gutfeld
- Spouse: Elena Moussa (m. 2004)
- Children: 1

Gregory John Gutfeld (born September 12, 1964) is an American television host, political commentator, comedian, and author. He is the host of the late-night comedy talk show Gutfeld!, which was formerly aired on Saturday nights as The Greg Gutfeld Show from May 2015 until March 2021, when it was announced that the show would move to weeknights.

Gutfeld is also one of five co-hosts and panelists on the political talk show The Five. Both of the shows air on Fox News. From 2007 to 2015, he hosted the 3 a.m. series Red Eye, a late-night talk show which also aired on Fox News.

== Early life and education ==
Gutfeld was born in San Mateo, California to Jacqueline Bernice "Jackie" (née Cauhape) and Alfred Jack Gutfeld. Growing up Catholic he attended the all-boys Roman Catholic Junípero Serra High School in San Mateo. In 1987, he graduated from the University of California, Berkeley with a BA degree in English. In a 2009 interview, he said his politics changed while in college:

I became a conservative by being around liberals, and I became a libertarian by being around conservatives. You realize that there's something distinctly in common between the two groups, the left and the right; the worst part of each of them is the moralizing.

== Career ==
After college, Gutfeld interned at The American Spectator, as an assistant to conservative writer R. Emmett Tyrrell. He then worked as a staff writer at Prevention magazine and as an editor for various Rodale Press magazines. In 1995, he became a staff writer at Men's Health. He was promoted to editor-in-chief of Men's Health in 1999. In 2000, he was replaced by David Zinczenko, a publisher.

Gutfeld then became editor-in-chief of Stuff, at the time owned by Dennis Publishing, a British company. During his tenure, circulation increased from 750,000 to 1.2 million. In 2003, Gutfeld hired several dwarfs to attend a conference of the Magazine Publishers of America on the topic of "buzz", with instructions to be as loud and annoying as possible. The stunt generated publicity but led to Gutfeld being fired soon afterwards; he then became "director of brand development" at Dennis Publishing. He edited the company's Maxim magazine in the U.K. from 2004 to 2006. His contract expired without renewal after losses in readership under his tenure.

Gutfeld was one of the first posting contributors to The Huffington Post, from its launch in 2005 until October 2008. Frequent targets of his commentaries included Huffington Post colleagues Deepak Chopra, Cenk Uygur, and Arianna Huffington.

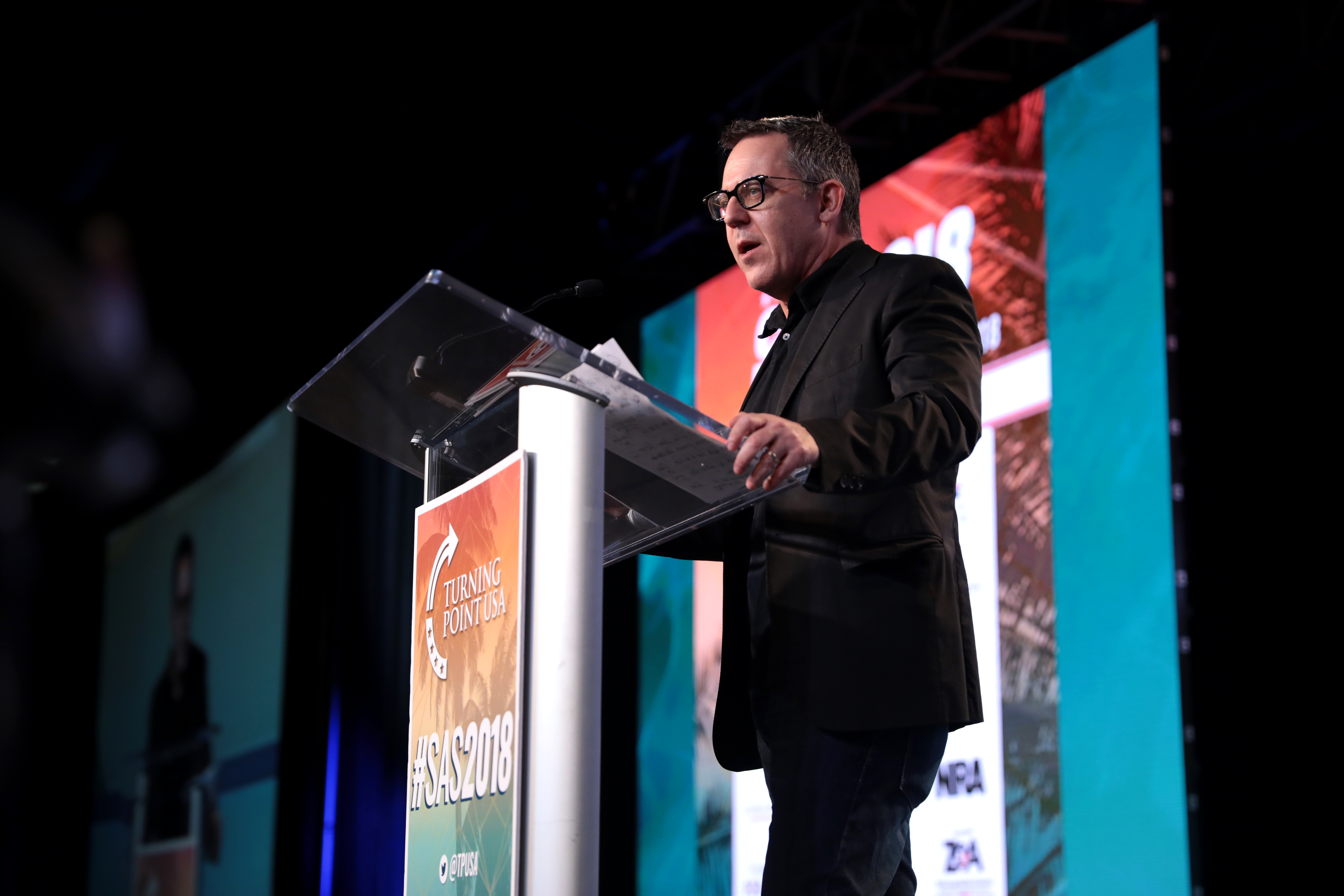
Gutfeld speaking at Turning Point USA, 2018

Beginning on February 5, 2007, Gutfeld served as host of the late-night talk show Red Eye on the Fox News Channel. The hour-long show initially aired at 2am. ET Monday through Saturday mornings and at 11pm on Saturday evenings. However, beginning in October 2007, the show began airing at 3am Monday through Saturday mornings while retaining its 11pm timeslot on Saturday evenings. From 2007 to 2013, Bill Schulz served as Gutfeld's sidekick and Andy Levy was the show's ombudsman. Schulz had been Gutfeld's colleague at Stuff magazine, and Levy was a fellow blogger at The Huffington Post. On July 11, 2011, Gutfeld became a co-host and panelist on the Fox News political talk show The Five, which airs weekdays at 5:00 P.M. ET. Gutfeld left Red Eye in February 2015, with Tom Shillue succeeding him as host.

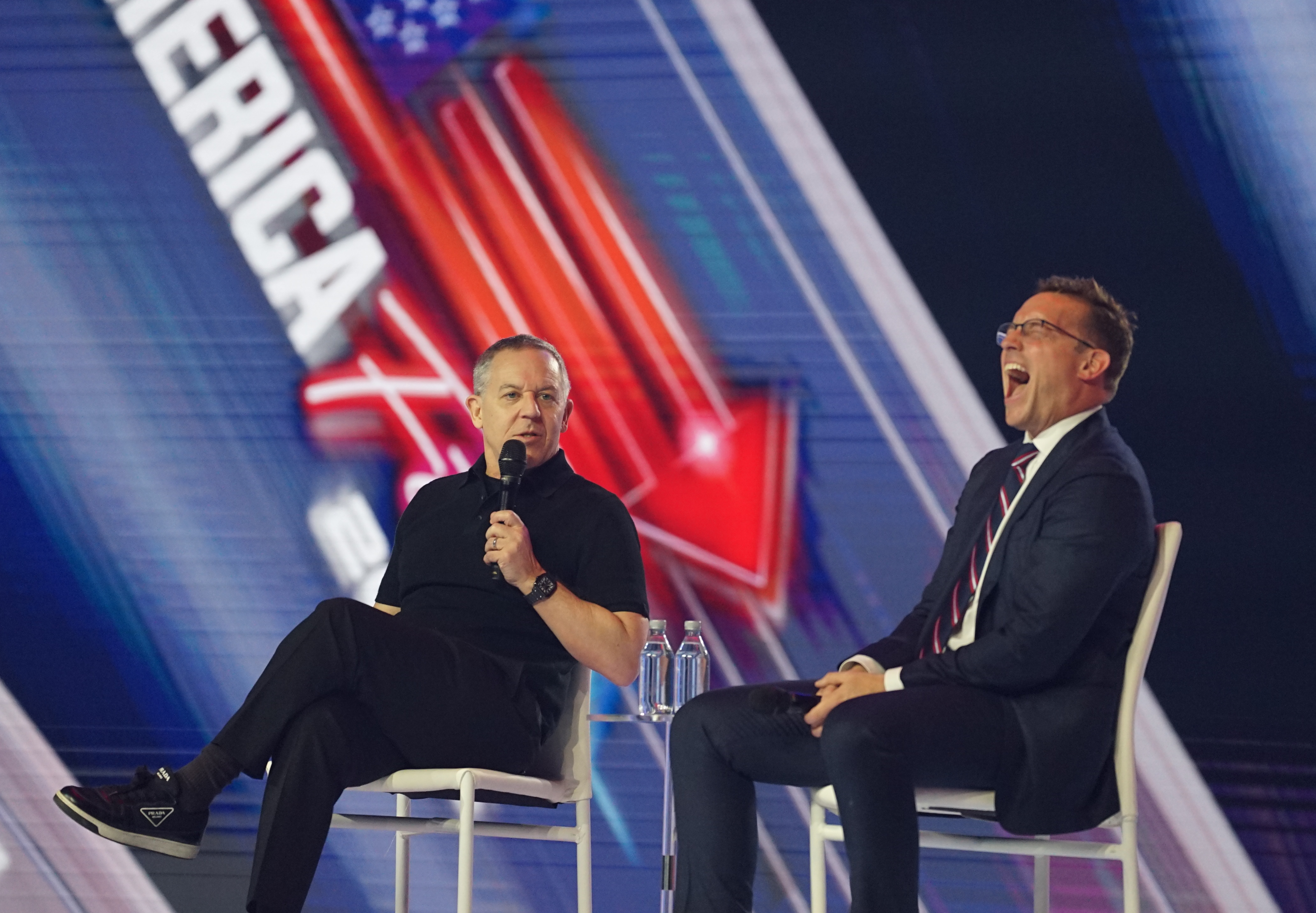
Gutfeld and Benny Johnson at AmericaFest 2025

On May 31, 2015, Gutfeld began hosting a new weekly late-night talk show on Fox News called The Greg Gutfeld Show; which aired on Saturdays at 10pm. In February 2021, it was announced that beginning in the second quarter, the show would move to weeknights at 11pm; on March 10, it was announced that it would be called Gutfeld! and premiere on April 5, 2021. In August 2021, Gutfeld! overtook The Late Show with Stephen Colbert in the nightly ratings, becoming the highest-rated late-night talk show in the United States (though "Gutfeld!" aired in prime time at 8 p.m. on the West Coast and did not repeat at 11 p.m.). It averaged 2.12 million nightly viewers, more than The Late Show, The Tonight Show Starring Jimmy Fallon, and Jimmy Kimmel Live!.

By the end of 2021, the combined viewership for Gutfeld! and The Five averaged over five million viewers. In June 2023, Fox News announced that Gutfeld! would move to 10 P.M. ET beginning July 17, as part of a larger realignment of its primetime schedule, which means the show is no longer considered "late night" as it is no longer competing with other late night shows.

Gutfeld has appeared as a guest on Coffee with Scott Adams and The Adam Carolla Show.

=== Recognition ===
In late 2021, Gutfeld was named the 12th-most influential person in American media by the Mediaite website. In 2022, he rose to 10th, recognized for his combined 6 million viewers across The Five and Gutfeld! in November. However, in 2023, Gutfeld dropped to 23rd due to controversial remarks and extreme rhetoric.

By 2024, Gutfeld was back in 12th place on Mediaite's rankings, reaffirming his position as one of Fox News' most-watched personalities.

== Controversies ==
Gutfeld has attracted controversy and significant backlash for a variety of inflammatory statements he has made over his time at Fox News. The New York Times described his rhetoric and style as "insult conservatism", and that it has allowed Gutfeld to "frame any serious argument as a joke and any joke as a serious argument, leaving viewers to suss out the distinction". In 2025, The Independent opined that his content was increasingly "sycophantic" towards Trump, and described his rhetoric as becoming "increasingly extreme and unhinged".

=== Apology to Canadians ===
During a Red Eye segment which aired on March 17, 2009, Gutfeld and his panel discussed Canadian Lieutenant General Andrew Leslie's statement that the Canadian Armed Forces may require a one-year "synchronized break" once Canada's mission in Afghanistan ended in 2011: "Meaning, the Canadian military wants to take a breather to do some yoga, paint landscapes, run on the beach in gorgeous white Capri pants." The comedian panelist Doug Benson added: "I didn't even know they were in the war... I thought that's where you go if you don't want to fight. Go chill in Canada." Gutfeld also said: "Isn't this the perfect time to invade this ridiculous country? They have no army!"

The segment was posted to YouTube three days after the reported deaths of four Canadian soldiers in Afghanistan, prompting widespread outrage. Canada had been in command of the NATO mission in Kandahar Province, the birthplace and former capital of the Taliban, for three years. Along with Helmand Province, it was "home to some of the fiercest opposition to coalition forces" and reported to "have the highest casualty rates per province."

Canadian Defence Minister Peter MacKay called on Fox to apologize for the comments and described the remarks as "despicable, hurtful and ignorant." Gutfeld, while maintaining that the show is satirical and irreverent, offered an apology, "The March 17 episode of Red Eye included a segment discussing Canada's plan for a 'synchronized break,' which was in no way an attempt to make light of troop efforts. However, I realize that my words may have been misunderstood. It was not my intent to disrespect the brave men, women, and families of the Canadian military, and for that, I apologize."

=== Russia's invasion of Ukraine ===
After Russia invaded Ukraine in 2022, Gutfeld said that the media were emotionally manipulating viewers with footage from the conflict "because that makes a profit for news companies." Gutfeld was rebuked by Fox foreign affairs correspondent Benjamin Hall who was on the ground in Kyiv: "(It) is not the media trying to drum up some emotional response. This is absolutely what's happening." A few days later, Hall was seriously injured, while Pierre Zakrzewski (who also worked for Fox) and a Ukrainian journalist were killed, in a surprise attack on the journalists by Russian forces.

=== Comments on the Holocaust and Nazism ===
During the July 24, 2023, broadcast of The Five, Gutfeld and co-host Jessica Tarlov discussed an educational curriculum in Florida public schools that would teach students that "slaves developed skills which, in some instances, could be applied for their personal benefit". Tarlov, who said she is Jewish, disagreed with the curriculum and asked if this could be argued for those who perished in the Holocaust. Gutfeld then invoked Viktor Frankl's book Man's Search For Meaning, implying that those who survived the Holocaust had to be skilled or useful.

On July 25, the Auschwitz Memorial disagreed with Gutfeld's statement, writing on Twitter: "While it is true that some Jews may have used their skills or usefulness to increase their chances of survival during the Holocaust, it is essential to contextualize this statement properly and understand that it does not represent the complex history of the genocide perpetrated by Nazi Germany." The same day, Andrew Bates, deputy White House press secretary, called Gutfeld's comments "a horrid, dangerous, extreme lie that insults the memory of the millions of Americans who suffered from the evil of enslavement". The Daily Beast reported that unnamed Fox News employees strongly disagreed with Gutfeld's statements. One producer stated it was "a disgusting thing to say" while another insider claimed "his career would be over."

Gutfeld later received criticism for comparing transgender healthcare providers to "Nazi doctors who experimented on Jews in the Holocaust".

On July 15, 2025, Gutfeld attracted controversy after claiming conservatives should reclaim the word "Nazi" for themselves after making comparisons of ICE agents and Trump to Nazism, saying:

This is why the criticism doesn't matter to us when you call us Nazis. Nazi this and Nazi that... I'm beginning to think they don't like us... I've said this before. We need to learn from the Blacks. The way they were able to remove the power from the n-word by using it... from now on, it's, 'What up, my Nazi? Hey, what up, my Nazi? Hey, what's hanging, my Nazi?'

The comments attracted criticism and allegations that Gutfeld was normalizing Nazism.

== Personal life ==
As of 2018, Gutfeld lives in New York City with his wife Elena Moussa, a Russian photo editor. They met in London, where he lived for three years. They have a daughter. Her birth was announced on December 10, 2024, on The Five, a show on Fox .

Gutfeld grew up Catholic and served as an altar boy. He says that he is an agnostic atheist. A fan of hard rock and heavy metal music, Gutfeld has spoken on-air about being a fan of many bands including Power Trip. He paid tribute to Power Trip's singer Riley Gale after his death in 2020. Members of the heavy metal band Gwar have appeared several times on his show. Gutfeld is a self-described libertarian.

== Books ==
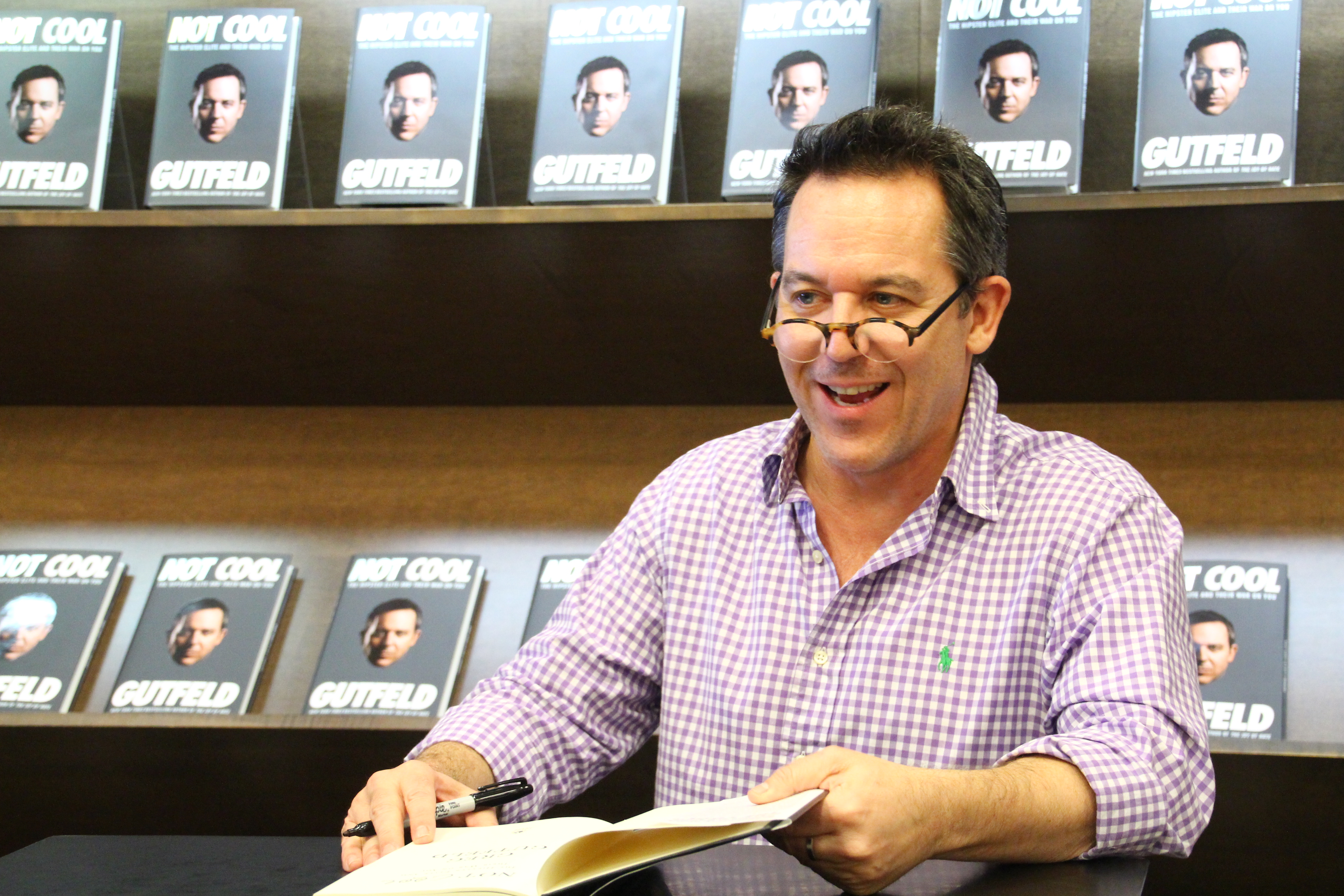
Gutfeld at a book signing for his book Not Cool (March 2014)

- The Scorecard: The Official Point System for Keeping Score in the Relationship Game. Henry Holt and Company. 1997. p. 182. ISBN 978-0-8050-5450-7.
- The Scorecard at Work: The Official Point System for Keeping Score on the Job. Henry Holt and Company. 1999. p. 160. ISBN 978-0-8050-5865-9.
- Lessons from the Land of Pork Scratchings. Simon & Schuster. 2008. p. 224. ISBN 978-1-84737-066-2.
- The Bible of Unspeakable Truths. Grand Central Publishing. 2010. p. 304. ISBN 978-0-446-55230-1.
- The Joy of Hate: How to Triumph over Whiners in the Age of Phony Outrage. New York: Crown Forum. 2012. p. 256. ISBN 978-0-307-98696-2.
- Not Cool: The Hipster Elite and Their War on You. New York: Crown Forum. 2014. p. 272. ISBN 978-0-8041-3853-6.
- How To Be Right: The Art of Being Persuasively Correct. New York: Crown Forum. 2015. ISBN 978-1-101-90362-9.
- The Gutfeld Monologues: Classic Rants from the Five. New York: Threshold Editions. 2018. ISBN 978-1-5011-9072-8.
- The Plus: Self-Help for People Who Hate Self-Help. Threshold Editions. 2020. ISBN 978-1-9821-4991-8.

== See also ==
- New Yorkers in journalism

== Sources ==
- Robertson, Campbell (April 10, 2007). "At 2 A.M., Dark Humor Meets the Lights". The New York Times.
- Whitehouse, David (June 16, 2007). "News crash!". The Guardian.
