= Tom Shillue =

American comedian (born 1966)

- Born: Thomas A. Shillue; June 13, 1966 (age 60); Norwood, Massachusetts, U.S.
- Other name: Angry White Man
- Education: University of Massachusetts Boston; Emerson College
- Spouse: Denise
- Children: 2

Comedy career
- Years active: 1993–present
- Medium: Stand-up, television, talk radio
- Website: tomshillue.com

Thomas A. Shillue (/ʃɪˈluː/; born June 13, 1966) is an American stand-up comedian, actor, author and talk-show host from Norwood, Massachusetts. He was a correspondent on The Daily Show on Comedy Central and hosted Red Eye on Fox News. He has been a supporting cast member on the Fox News talk show Gutfeld! (formerly called The Greg Gutfeld Show) since the show premiered in 2015.

In 2017, Shillue released his first book, Mean Dads for a Better America: The Generous Rewards of an Old-Fashioned Childhood. In June 2017, Shillue began hosting a weekday afternoon three-hour syndicated talk radio show on Fox News Radio, also heard on SiriusXM's Fox News Talk Channel 450.

== Television and film ==
Shillue appeared regularly on Late Night with Jimmy Fallon as a member of the "Ragtime Gals", a barbershop quartet that also includes Jimmy Fallon, which performs pop songs in a barbershop style. Examples include singing "SexyBack" along with Justin Timberlake and "Roxanne" along with Sting. He is also a cast member on the popular Fox News talk show, Gutfeld!, notable for his parodies of Joe Biden and Adam Schiff. Shillue has appeared with Conan O'Brien doing stand-up comedy. He appeared in the film Mystery Team by Derrick Comedy in 2009. His television credits include guest spots on programs like Spin City, Broad City and Law & Order.

A correspondent on The Daily Show since 2014, Shillue has subbed in for Greg Gutfeld, co-hosting The Five. He served as the permanent host of Red Eye from June 22, 2015, when Gutfeld left to host his new show Gutfeld!, until Red Eye was cancelled in April 2017. Shillue remains a contributor on the Fox News Channel. Soon after Red Eye was cancelled, Shillue joined Gutfeld! as a permanent cast member, though he had been making appearances on the show as early as 2015.

In 2019, Shillue served as the host of The Quiz Show on Fox Nation. Later in 2019, he began impersonating several politicians, including Biden and Schiff on The Greg Gutfeld Show. He also appeared as "President Biden" and "Angry White Male" on Gutfeld!.

In July 2023, Shillue began serving as a regular host on Fox News Saturday Night before Failla became the permanent host.

== Stand-up and theatre ==
Shillue performed frequently as an opening act for Jim Gaffigan. He also performed a two-man show along with Gaffigan in the late 1990s called The North American White Male.

Shillue has performed solo shows including Supernormal at PS122 and Dad 2.0 at Ars Nova Theatre.

== Additional projects ==
Shillue announced his 12 in 12 project, whereby he would release an album of new material each month from November 2012 to October 2013. Some viewers of Red Eye believed the promotion of these new albums was a running gag on the show, a misconception that Shillue and Gutfeld dispelled on air, leading to a spike in sales.

On April 25, 2017, Shillue and Andy Levy began hosting on Fox News Radio from 6 to 9 pm EST. On July 10, 2017, he started hosting the Tom Shillue Show from 3 to 6 pm EST on Fox News Radio.

== Awards ==
- ECNY Award Best Storyteller 2011
- ECNY Award Best One Person Show 2010
