= George Wilson (artist) =

American comic illustrator

- Born: George Davis Wilson Jr. August 2, 1921 Buffalo, New York
- Died: December 7, 1998 (aged 77)
- Area: Painter
- Notable works: Gold Key Comics painted covers

George Davis Wilson Jr. (August 2, 1921–December 7, 1998) was an American painter best known for his work in the comics industry as a cover artist for Dell Comics and Gold Key Comics from the 1950s to the early 1980s.

== Early life ==
George Wilson was born on August 2, 1921, in Buffalo, New York. He attended the Richmond Art School and the Pratt Institute. He enlisted in the U.S. Army in September 1942 and was assigned to the 603rd Engineer Camouflage Battalion. He was deployed to Normandy on June 20, 1944, as part of the Ghost Army, a tactical deception unit which deceived the Axis forces and mislead them as to the size and location of Allied forces.

== Career ==
Wilson began painting covers for Dell Comics in 1955 and moved to Gold Key Comics in 1962.

He painted covers for most on the Gold Key line including Tarzan, Korak, Son of Tarzan, and Turok, Son of Stone. His cover paintings appeared on science fiction comics such as Doctor Solar, Man of the Atom; Magnus, Robot Fighter; and Space Family Robinson, as well as mystery comics titles including Boris Karloff Tales of Mystery, Ripley's Believe It or Not!, and The Twilight Zone. Wilson's covers were frequently used on licensed properties based on television programs such as Dark Shadows, Star Trek, and Voyage to the Bottom of the Sea. As Gold Key's publishing output began to decrease, Wilson focused on providing covers for paperback novels. His clients included Avon, Grosset & Dunlap, and Harlequin Enterprises.

== Legacy ==
Artist Joe Jusko noted in 2021 that Wilson's "imagination and design sense both awe and inspire me to this day. Whether depicting a narrative scene or an ethereal montage of story elements, his covers always caught your attention, both through composition and one of the most imaginative and varied color senses I’ve ever seen." Hermes Press published The Art of George Wilson in 2025.

== Personal life ==
Wilson married Judy Putnam Low on December 18, 1971. He died December 7, 1998, at the age of 77.

== Bibliography ==
=== Comic books ===
Wilson's comic book covers included the following:

==== Dell Comics ====
- Combat #14–15 (1964–1965)
- Edgar Rice Burroughs' Tarzan #66, 70, 72, 77–79, 111–112, 115–118, 120, 122–131 (1955–1962)
- Four Color #737, 794, 898, 900, 939, 1243, 1245, 1288 (1956–1962)
- Indian Chief #26–27, 33 (1957–1959)
- Jungle Jim #7, 19 (1956–1959)
- Turok, Son of Stone #16–17, 20, 29 (1959–1962)
- The Twilight Zone #01-860-210 (1962)

==== Gilberton Company, Inc. ====
- Classics Illustrated #29, 76, 133, 138A, 140 (1955–1957)

==== Gold Key Comics ====
- Boris Karloff Tales of Mystery #3–6, 8–11, 13, 16–22, 24–50, 52–54, 59–60, 65–67, 69–72, 77–78, 84–86, 91 (1963–1979)
- Boys' and Girls' March of Comics #202, 234, 320, 352, 378, 408, 411 (1960–1975)
- Brothers of the Spear #2–11, 13–17 (1972–1976)
- Captain Venture and the Land Beneath the Sea #1–2 (1968–1969)
- Dark Shadows #8–28, 30 (1971–1975)
- Doctor Solar, Man of the Atom #3–27 (1963–1969)
- Edgar Rice Burroughs' Korak, Son of Tarzan #8, 12–45 (1965–1972)
- Edgar Rice Burroughs' Tarzan of the Apes #132–158, 160–161, 167, 169–170, 172–206 (1962–1972)
- Fantastic Voyage #2 (1969)
- Flash Gordon #19, 25 (1978–1979)
- Freedom Agent #1 (1963)
- Grimm's Ghost Stories #1–10, 12–19, 21, 25, 29, 32, 34, 37, 39, 42, 46–47 (1972–1978)
- Jet Dream #1 (1968)
- John Steele, Secret Agent #1 (1964)
- The Jungle Twins #1–17 (1972–1975)
- King Kong #1 (1968)
- Lone Ranger #23–26, 28 (1975–1977)
- M.A.R.S. Patrol Total War #3–6, 8–10 (1966–1969)
- Magnus, Robot Fighter #1–2, 4, 7–13, 20, 25–27 (1963–1969)
- Mighty Samson #2, 4–20, 23–24, 28–30 (1965–1975)
- Mod Wheels #17 (1975)
- Mystery Comics Digest #1, 3–15, 17–21, 26 (1972–1975)
- The Occult Files of Dr. Spektor #1–8 (1973–1974)
- The Phantom #2–17 (1963–1966)
- Ripley's Believe It or Not! #1, 5–16, 18, 22, 26, 28–29, 31–44, 47–48, 50–52, 55, 57–66, 69, 75–77, 80–84, 86–88, 90 (1965–1979)
- Shadow Play #1 (1982)
- Space Family Robinson #1–36 (1962–1969)
- Space Family Robinson Lost in Space #37 (1973)
- Space Family Robinson, Lost in Space on Space Station One #38–42, 44–51, 53–54 (1974–1977)
- Star Trek #10–29, 33–40, 42–44, 53, 57 (1971–1978)
- Star Trek, The Psychocrystals #11358 (1978)
- Steve Zodiac and the Fireball XL 5 #1 (1964)
- Supercar #3 (1963)
- Tales of Sword and Sorcery Dagar the Invincible #1, 5–6, 12 (1972–1975)
- The Time Tunnel #1–2 (1967)
- Top Comics Edgar Rice Burroughs Tarzan of the Apes #1 (1967)
- Total War #1–2 (1965)
- The Travels of Jaimie McPheeters #1 (1963)
- Turok, Son of Stone #30–35, 37–39, 41, 44–48, 50–60, 62, 64–92, 94, 96–100, 103–110, 112–113, 115 (1962–1978)
- The Twilight Zone #1–3, 5–19, 22–28, 30–57, 61, 68, 71–73, 75, 78–80, 90–91 (1962–1979)
- UFO Flying Saucers #1–4, 8, 11–13 (1968–1977)
- Voyage to the Bottom of the Sea #1–6, 8–13 (1964–1968)
- Walt Disney's the Scarecrow #3 (1965)
- X: The Man with the X-ray Eyes #1 (1963)
