= Spymaster USA =

- Created by: Jacqui Wilson
- Starring: Eric Haney
- Country of origin: United States
- No. of seasons: 1
- No. of episodes: 5

Production
- Running time: 60 minutes

Original release
- Network: The Learning Channel
- Release: March 30 – April 27, 2004

Related
- Spy

Spymaster USA is an American television program originally made by Wall to Wall Television for The Learning Channel in 2003. The series was created by Jacqui Wilson for Europe and the United States. The American version was directed by Chris Holt and Dennis Lofgren.

The series follows a group of real-life volunteers as they are trained by former spies, military, and law enforcement in espionage techniques, including maintaining a false identity, fitness, weapons handling, surveillance, persuasion and recruitment.

The format uses by this series was based on the BBC program Spymaster (2002; UK) and has been expanded into a popular British series Spy.

== Candidates and competition ==
Candidates from across the United States applied for entry into the show. Eventually these candidates were narrowed down to 30, who came to Baltimore for several days to participate in a series of qualifier exercises. This group appeared in the first episode. From these 30 were selected 12 candidates who would enter the main production segment. Notification of acceptance as one of the 12 finalists was done by telephone and email.

During the rest of the production, candidates were eliminated from competition by host and former Delta Force NCO Eric Haney. Contestants who failed to make the cut were dismissed in front of their peers.

In the final episode, one recruit emerged as the winner, but there was no prize other than the satisfaction of knowing that they had what it takes to be a real spy.

Haney was assisted by two other judges; one was a former Navy SEAL, the other a former Secret Service agent. Active duty military personnel, including Navy SEAL Jason Redman, were in charge of the recruits.

== Episodes ==
The series consisted of five one-hour episodes filmed in order during the spring of 2003. The initial pool of 30 candidates were first tested in Baltimore, MD, in physical conditioning tests, a maze-like gauntlet designed to test memory under stress, rappelling from an 18-story building, and in marksmanship. 12 Candidates were invited to "The Farm," a remote former Virginia plantation that has been converted into an executive retreat. Here the candidates were whittled down from 12 to four, being tested in hand-to-hand combat, surveillance, deception, interrogation techniques, and other types of spycraft. The candidates also underwent evasive driving training at Virginia International Raceway, parachute jump training, and live fire exercises, including hostage rescue, at Blackwater's North Carolina training facility.

For the final episode, the candidates learned they were to travel to Tijuana Mexico, and operate both alone and with their teammates. The four final contestants were:

- Ravi Khanna (a programmer from Maryland)
- Grisella Martinez (a paralegal from Washington, DC)
- Richard Williamson (a marketing professional from Florida)
- Leigh Anne Tarbill (a former figure skater from Washington)

With the help of some undercover Tijuana detectives, the producers put the four finalists through a series of tests that became progressively more difficult. Eventually, Martinez was declared the winner, after escorting a "hostage" to a helicopter rescue on the banks of the Tijuana River.

The final episode was dedicated to second-place finisher Tarbill, who died from accidental carbon monoxide poisoning in December 2003. The incident, caused by a faulty natural gas pool heater, was later found to be an act of negligence resulting in a $4.4 million settlement.

== Production notes ==
Shooting lasted for 29 days. A minimum of three camera/sound crews followed the candidates, and the production made liberal use of remote and hidden cameras. The crew was a mix of veterans from the original UK version of Spymaster and some American film/TV professionals.
