= Julian Butler =

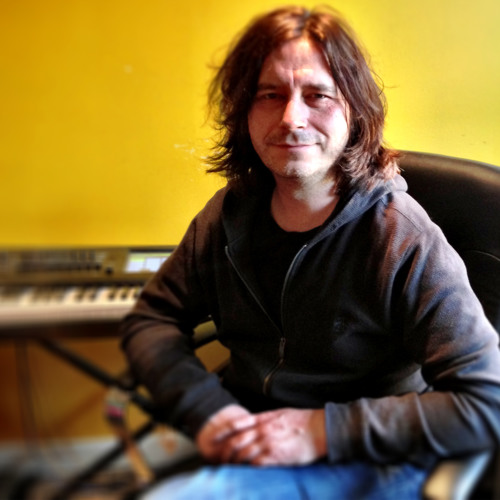

Background information
- Born: 15 August 1970 (age 55); Maidstone, Kent, England
- Genres: Theatre, children's theatre, pop, classical
- Occupation: Composer
- Label: Pop! Records privatejokemusic.com
- Website: julianbutler.co.uk

Julian Butler (born 15 Aug 1970) is an English composer, lyricist, and writer. He is best known for his work in children's theatre.

== Career ==
Butler wrote the script, lyrics and co-wrote the music for Space Family Robinson, a musical starring Hannah Waddingham. It premiered at the Pleasance Theatre, London in 2002.

As a composer and lyricist, he has specialised in work for young audiences, most notably on the Charlie and Lola stage shows Charlie and Lola's Best Bestest Play and Charlie and Lola's Extremely New Play.

He has worked for Polka Theatre, providing music, lyrics and sound design to over 50 productions, including The Wind in the Willows, Julia Donaldson's The Everywhere Bear and The Paper Dolls.

From 2003 to 2011, Butler was lead singer with rock band Viper Squadron, who released their debut album Attack of the Vapours in 2006.

In 2011, he wrote music and lyrics for a new musical version of Red Riding Hood with Mike Kenny which premiered at the Djanogly Theatre, Nottingham on 10 December 2011.

In 2013 he wrote and recorded the song "Time Stands Still" featuring vocals by David McAlmont.

In 2015, he wrote the book, lyrics and music for Neverland, a musical based on J.M. Barrie's 1904 play Peter and Wendy. It premiered at the Djanogly Theatre, Nottingham on 4 December 2015.

== Awards ==
Butler was given the ACA Members Award for his contribution to children's theatre at the 2016 JM Barrie Awards.

== Selected discography ==
Performer	Title	Details
Julian & Stephen Butler	Space Family Robinson (Original Soundtrack)	Released: 2002; Label: Pop! Records; Format: CD (POP021)
Viper Squadron	Attack of the Vapours	Released: 2006; Label: Pop! Records; Format: CD (POP061)
Viper Squadron	Battle of the Planets	Released: 2011; Label: Pop! Records; Format: download, streaming
Viper Squadron	Confederacy of the Bees	Released: 2014; Label: Pop! Records; Format: download, streaming
Private Joke	Honour Among Thieves	Released: 2016; Label: Pop! Records; Format: download, streaming
