= Spy (2004 TV series) =

British television series

Spy is a British television programme originally made by Wall to Wall for BBC Three in 2004. It has been one of the most-exported United Kingdom television shows; according to the Producers' Alliance for Cinema and Television (PACT), it had been sold to 129 countries by April 2005.

The series follows a group of real-life volunteers as they are trained by former spies in espionage techniques, including maintaining a false identity, surveillance, persuasion and recruitment. The programme's psychological challenges, dramatic tension, high production values, and personable cast led to its being called 'the most addictive thing on TV at the moment' by The Daily Telegraph.

The series further develops a format that first appeared in the Wall to Wall television productions Spymaster (2002; UK) and Spymaster USA (2003; USA).

SPY: A Handbook, a companion book written by Harry Ferguson, a trainer featured on the show, was published in 2004 by Bloomsbury in the UK (ISBN 0-7475-7523-1).

== Candidates and competition ==
Over 5,000 candidates from across the United Kingdom applied to be on the show. The candidates were narrowed down to a pool of eight recruits before the start of the show. As the show progressed, recruits who failed to demonstrate sufficient potential as agents were unceremoniously dismissed from the competition.

In the final episode, Nicola Jackson emerged as the winner, but there was no prize other than the satisfaction of knowing that they had what it takes to be a real spy.

The recruits, in alphabetical order, were:

- Daboh, Austin (19, male)
- Dhiri, Reena (28, female)
- Dilworth, Simon (35, male)
- Glantz, Suzi (58, female)
- Jackson, Nicola (24, female)
- Moule, Jennie (27, female)
- van Schweiger, Max (35, male)
- Winn, Gabriel (24, male)

The three experts, called their "tutors", who devised the training missions, trained the recruits, and evaluated their performance were:

- Mike Baker, a former CIA field operations officer
- Sandy Williams, a former Intelligence Officer
- Harry Ferguson, formerly of MI6

Additional training was conducted by John Potter, and narration was provided by Paul Brightwell.

== Episodes ==
Ten hour-long episodes were originally produced. The show was then recut into a series of 15 half-hour episodes. Broadcasters in some markets air the original series, while broadcasters in other markets air the other.

Summaries published for the original ten episodes follow:

#101 – Into the Unknown
Stripped of their old identities, the raw recruits meet for the first time in London on day one. They receive their first briefing from their 'tutors.' With no time to unpack, they are sent on their first mission: a real test used by Mossad, the Israeli Secret Service. They are given just 10 minutes to talk their way into a stranger's flat and be seen by their trainers drinking a glass of water on the balcony. After only 24 hours on the course, the recruits must learn a vital lesson: every spy can break under pressure. Without warning they are abducted from their safe-houses in the middle of the night and interrogated by intelligence professionals. They must stick to their cover names and avoid giving away any details about their real lives.
#102 – Open Your Eyes
The wannabe spies hone their skills at 'going grey' – the art of mingling in a crowd without being noticed. The trainers instruct them in using effective body language and building an instant rapport with strangers. The recruits then embark on their toughest mission yet, which will test their skills of persuasion, nerve and the ability to think on their feet. They attempt to gain access to an office building (during working hours) and take photographs of confidential documents without getting caught.
#103 – Under Cover
The greatest spies in history are those who blend effortlessly into any new environment. Will the recruits be up to the job? Their mission brief is simple – go undercover, assume a new identity and fool those around them into believing that they're someone they're not. Their trainers, real former spies, are monitoring their progress and have a devious trap to find the recruits out. Will all of them make it through?
#104 – The Confidence of Strangers
The recruits continue their quest to master the spying game. Following the dismissal of the first candidate, the remaining recruits struggle with their feelings as they are taught the ruthless art of cultivation – how to lie and manipulate others. Whether it's gaining confidential information from a hotel receptionist or getting a total stranger to look after a sensitive document for them, the recruits will need all their skills of charm and persuasion to pull it off. The recruits' final, highly confidential mission is to win the trust of each other's nearest and dearest. They are to manipulate the person to gain entry into the family home and photograph the master bedroom without being detected.
#105 – Too Close for Comfort
The art of surveillance is a core skill for any would-be spy. Working in teams, the recruits practice the basics of following targets without being noticed or drawing attention to themselves. The would-be spies are tested as the trainers watch and judge them on their triumphs and failures. For their latest mission, the recruits must use all their spy skills and put their professionalism to the ultimate test in a one-on-one surveillance mission in Brighton. They don't realize until the last minute that their target is actually their closest friend or family member whom they haven't been allowed to see since starting the course. If they allow their personal feelings to compromise the mission, they risk being thrown out of spy school.
#106 – Safe as Houses
Having mastered observation and surveillance skills, the recruits are now faced with their first 36-hour mission. They have to mount a surveillance operation on the occupants of two target houses. They must break into target properties, plant secret cameras and bugs and fix tracking devices to cars. Split into teams, the recruits' relationships are put to the test as they share cramped and claustrophobic living conditions for the duration of their stake-out.
#107 – Crossing the Line
The art of cultivating an agent is the core work of an intelligence officer. Teaming up in pairs, the six remaining recruits take temporary jobs at a barber shop, a gym and a clothing store. Their fellow employees are unaware that their new coworkers are spies. After working undercover cultivating and befriending a complete stranger in order to turn them into their agent, it is time for the recruits to complete their mission. They will have to manipulate their target and get them to cross the line of morality, by persuading them to lie, sign a fake document or help them in a legally questionable way.
#108 – The Enemy Within
After six weeks on the course, the recruits have learned to rely on each other and have come to appreciate the value of trust and collaboration. But this time they will have to embrace the darker side of spying: betrayal. Two recruits are the subjects of internal investigations and it is up to their fellow spies to set a trap and gather incriminating evidence. For some this will mean the end of the course. Spy school is closed and the recruits are about to graduate to their final mission, but first they must pass the ultimate test of loyalty. They find out what it's like when a spy thinks their organization has turned against them, and that they've been left out in the cold.
#109 – Out in the Cold
The tension mounts as the four remaining recruits are exposed to their most dangerous scenario to date and their loyalty is tested to the limit. The trainers have assigned all the recruits a mission that is truly impossible. Each recruit is led to believe that, having failed, they must leave the project. The recruits must keep their heads among false sex scandals and offers of vast sums of money from PR consultant Max Clifford. At their most vulnerable, will they give in to greed and hunger for instant fame, fall into the trap and betray their organization by selling secrets to the tabloids? As in the real world of espionage, any recruit who betrays their organization will face the consequences.
#110 – End Game
The final three recruits have been tested to their limits and beyond in their bid to come to grips with the spying game. With their training now complete, the trio must undertake a final confidential mission abroad, working against professionals. Without the support of their trainers and unsure if they can trust each other, they must complete their mission without being detected by their target or the local authorities. There is also a final twist in the tale, as the recruits and their cameraman are taken by police for questioning at local jail. Only one recruit will return from this mission as the perfect spy.

== See also ==
- Aldwych tube station, where portions of the show were produced
- Lindsay Moran, book details some training corresponding to the show
