= The ½ Hour News Hour =

American television news satire program

- Genre: News/political satire
- Created by: Joel Surnow
- Presented by: Kurt Long; Jennifer Robertson
- Starring: Manny Coto; Ned Rice; Dennis Miller
- Composer: Sean Callery
- Country of origin: United States
- Original language: English
- No. of episodes: 17

Production
- Executive producers: Joel Surnow; Manny Coto; Ned Rice; Joe Revello; Michael Binkow
- Producers: KC Warnke; Sandy Frank
- Editor: Keegan Martin
- Running time: approx. 26 minutes
- Production company: 20th Century Fox Television

Original release
- Network: Fox News
- Release: February 18 – September 23, 2007

The ½ Hour News Hour is an American television news satire show that aired on Fox News. The program presented news stories from a conservative perspective, using a satirical format akin to Saturday Night Live's Weekend Update, This Hour Has 22 Minutes, and The Daily Show.

The first pilot aired on February 18, 2007, and the second on March 4, 2007. Fox News later purchased 13 more episodes of the show, which started airing on May 13, 2007. The show was subsequently cancelled, and the final episode aired on September 23, 2007.

Cast and crew of the show included Kurt Long (playing co-anchor Kurt McNally), Jennifer Robertson (playing co-anchor Jennifer Lange), Manny Coto, and Ned Rice. Longtime Weekend Update anchor Dennis Miller was a regular contributor to the program with his "The Buck Starts Here" segment.

== Background ==
Originally pitched as This Just In, the show was turned down by the Fox Broadcasting Company's late-night division before being picked up by Fox News' chief Roger Ailes for a trial run.

This was the first comedy show created by Joel Surnow, a producer best known for his success with the serialized action show 24. His description of the show initially was, "The Daily Show for conservatives", later expanding upon that description by stating, "You can turn on any show and see Bush being bashed. There really is nothing out there for those who want satire that tilts right."

== Recurring sketches ==
- Conspiracy Corner – segments where a guest presents generally accepted information about a topic, and that information is treated as far-fetched by the host, who holds stereotypical left-wing views.
- Guy White: Closet Conservative — a cartoon featuring a conservative man working in an office in which everyone else is a liberal caricature.
- Hollywood Helping Humanity — satirical public service announcements featuring actors endorsing dubious causes, such as recycling breast implants. Actors appearing in this sketch include Leyla Milani, Ken Davitian, Ian Ziering, and Lorenzo Lamas.
- I'm the ACLU — satirical advertisements "boasting" of controversial causes supported by the ACLU.
- Presidential Addresses — Radio talk show host Rush Limbaugh had a recurring cameo role as the President, with conservative pundit Ann Coulter as his Vice President.

== Reception ==
The broadcast of the pilot episode, which aired on Sunday, February 18, 2007, at 10 p.m., was watched by 1,478,000 viewers. The rebroadcast of the same episode one week later was watched by 971,000 people. The second episode on Sunday, March 4, received similar ratings with 1,384,000 viewers.

Publications gave the show's initial two episodes historically poor reviews. The Chicago Tribune said, "The humor is so predictable and so stale that it fails to produce any laughs", while The Philadelphia Inquirer commented that "The 1/2 Hour News Hour is slow torture all by itself." Metacritic's television division, which produces composite scores based on prominent reviewers' opinions of television pilots, other episodes, and/or DVD releases, gave The Half Hour News Hour pilots a score of 13 out of 100, making it the lowest-rated television production ever reviewed on the site. Despite the pilots' poor reviews, the show continued to lead its time slot in the ratings among cable news networks. The show's lead over its competition shrank considerably, however, with its August 5, 2007, airing.

== Cancellation ==
The show's cancellation was announced on August 14, 2007, and its last episode aired on September 23, 2007. At the time, Bill Shine, the Senior Vice President of programming at Fox News, stated that "we are considering ways to retool the show for future scheduling needs."

== See also ==
=== Fox News Channel ===
- The Greg Gutfeld Show/Gutfeld!
- Red Eye

=== Other related programming ===
- The Colbert Report
- The Daily Show
- This Hour Has 22 Minutes
