= Lúpin =

Monthly Argentine comics magazine

Revista Lúpin (Lúpin Magazine) was a monthly Argentine comics magazine. Guillermo Guerrero and Héctor Mario Sidoli launched it on February 1, 1966. It was discontinued in 2007.

The comic takes its name from the popular Argentine comic strip hero Lúpin el Piloto, which debuted in 1959.

== Concept ==
The comic featured the air adventures of its pilot hero Lúpin, as well as other strips with regular characters, usually with a technical or scientific bent. The inspiration behind making a comic strip about a pilot came from Guerrero's past as a civil pilot. It also included plans for building model aircraft, simple electronic devices, telescopes, and other technical objects. The name Lúpin is a lunfardo word for "looping the loop" that comes from the English word "looping". The accent on the u is not standard in Spanish spelling. Guerrero also commented that it created confusion, the intended pronunciation resembles the English pronunciation of "looping", while the standard Spanish pronunciation rules indicate that the word should take emphasis in the second syllable, because of this rule, a big number of people of people ended up saying Lupín instead.

Sidoli died in December 2006. It was announced in May 2007, that issue 499 of the Revista Lúpin had been the last because of a dispute between Sidoli's widow and Guerrero over author's rights. Some characters might have continued in a new magazine owned by Guerrero alone. However, Guerrero died on June 25, 2009.

== Cultural impact ==
Although never a huge popular success, it received letters from Argentine engineers, pilots, and even a NASA astronaut who read it as children. Néstor Kirchner, the president of Argentina from 2003 to 2007, was nicknamed Lúpin because of his physical resemblance to the character.
