= Gutfeld! =

American news and political satire talk show

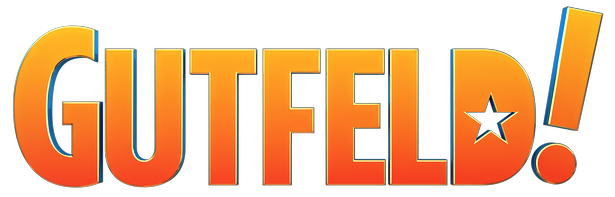
- Also known as: The Greg Gutfeld Show (2015–2021)
- Genre: Talk show; News comedy; Political satire
- Created by: Greg Gutfeld
- Developed by: Suzanne Scott; Jay Wallace
- Directed by: Michael Weinstein
- Presented by: Greg Gutfeld
- Starring: Kat Timpf; Tyrus
- Country of origin: United States
- Original language: English
- No. of seasons: 6

Production
- Executive producer: Tom O'Connor
- Producer: Greg Gutfeld (uncredited)
- Production location: New York City
- Camera setup: Multi-camera
- Running time: 60 minutes
- Production company: Fox News Media

Original release
- Network: Fox News Channel
- Release: May 31, 2015 – present

Related
- Red Eye; The Five

Gutfeld! is an American television prime time talk show starring Greg Gutfeld, airing weeknights on Fox News Channel at 10:00 p.m. ET. After the weekend edition ended, the current format premiered on April 5, 2021. Originally broadcast during late-night, it moved an hour earlier in July 2023.

The show debuted on May 31, 2015, as The Greg Gutfeld Show, with Gutfeld as host and Kat Timpf along with Joanne Nosuchinsky as regular panelists. After Nosuchinsky left the show in 2016, Tyrus joined the cast. While considered a conservative program, Gutfeld and Timpf are libertarian, with bipartisan guests often appearing.

Since early 2016, Gutfeld! has been taped in front of a live studio audience, and features a combination of political satire, news comedy and discussion regarding current events. From 2007 to 2015, Gutfeld hosted a similar late-night talk show on Fox News called Red Eye.

== Cast and notable guests ==
- Greg Gutfeld: host (2015–present)
- Kat Timpf: regular panelist & co-host (2015–present)
- Tyrus: regular panelist & co-host (2016–present)
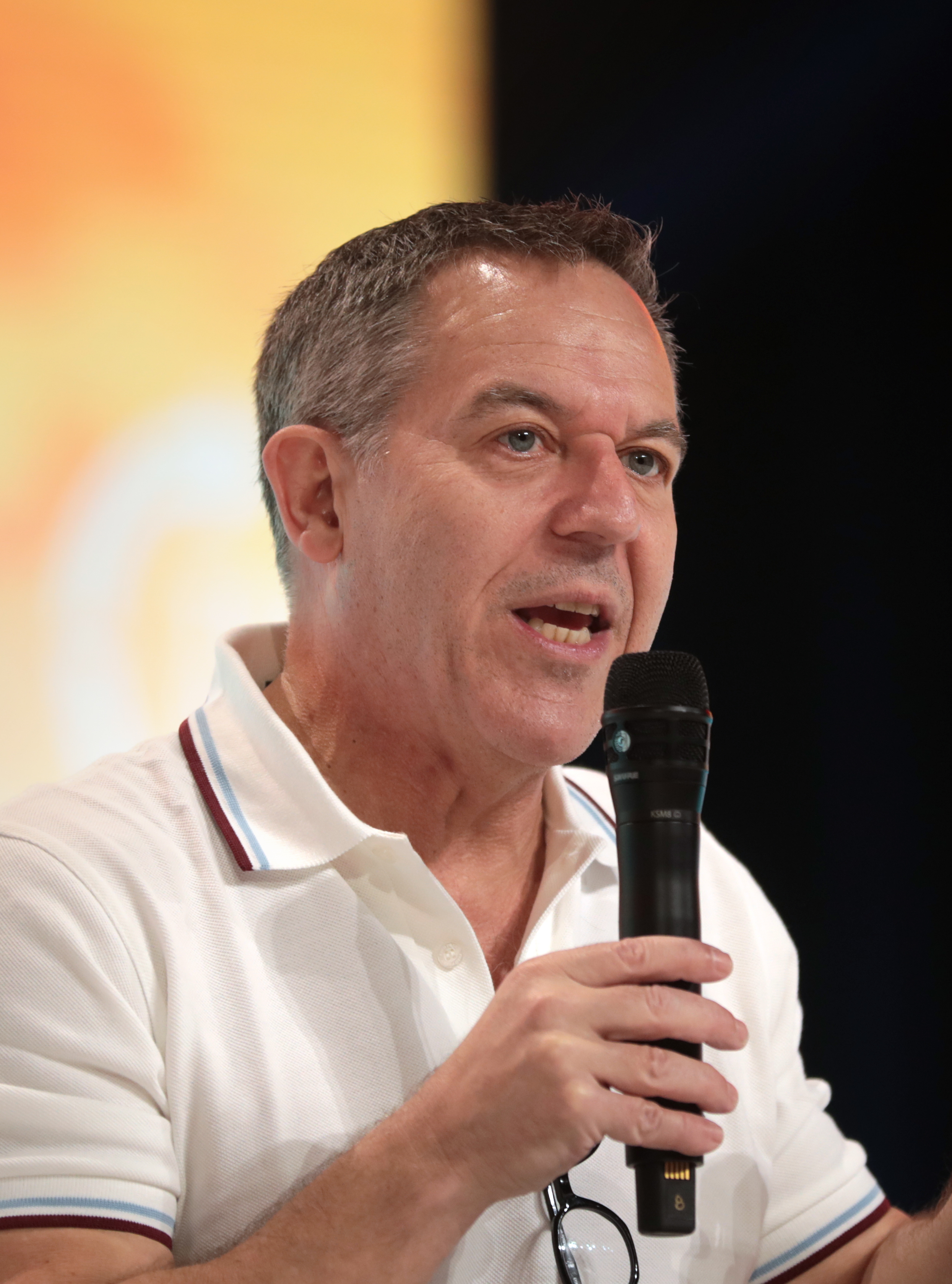
Host Greg Gutfeld

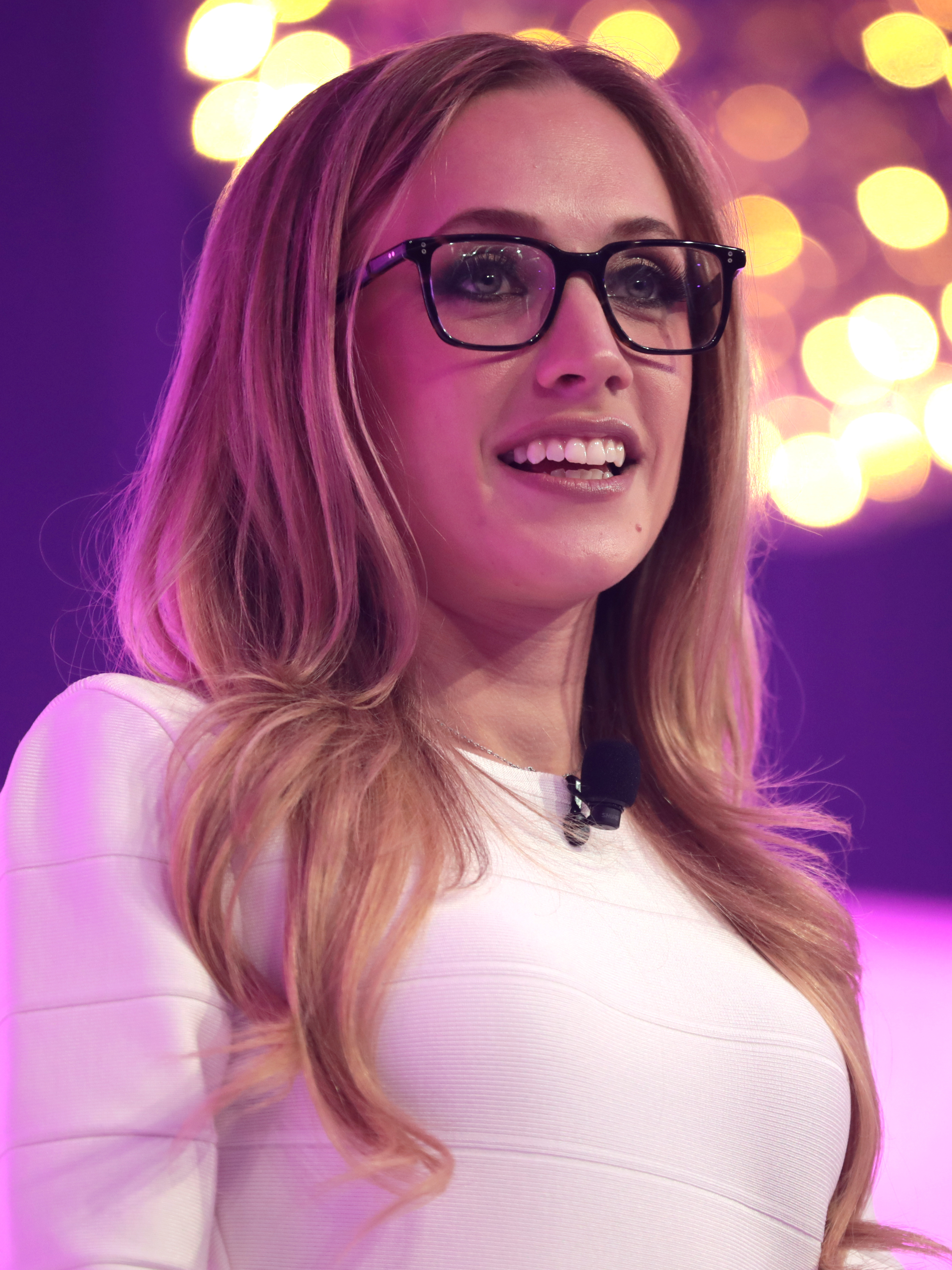
Co-host/contributor Kat Timpf

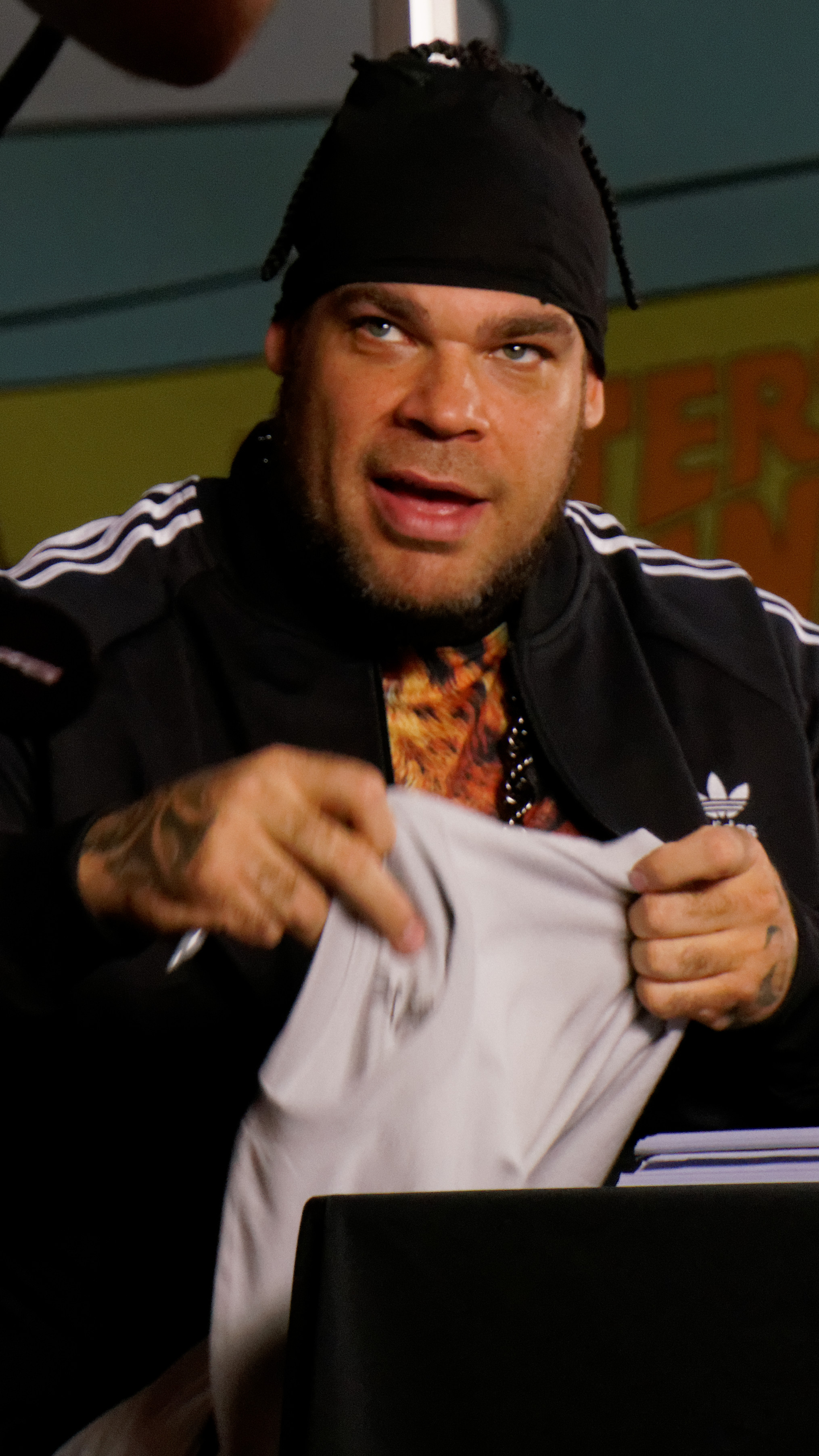
Co-host/contributor Tyrus

When the show debuted in 2015, the cast originally included the host Greg Gutfeld, regular panelist Kat Timpf and former panelist Joanne Nosuchinsky, producer and writer Gene Nelson, executive producer and announcer Tom O'Connor, and comedian Tom Shillue. After Nosuchinsky decided to pursue an acting career at the end of 2016, Tyrus replaced her while still a professional wrestler. The show staff also includes Nick Di Paolo (writer), Arash Mosaleh (senior producer) and comedian Adam Hunter (writer and frequent guest).

When the show moved to weeknights in 2021, stand-up comedians Joe Machi (Last Comic Standing) and Joe DeVito, as well as Fox News host Emily Compagno joined as frequent panelists. In 2022, comedian and actor Jamie Lissow (Real Rob) joined as a regular guest, after Machi was seen less on the show as he embarked on a comedy tour. Lissow and Machi are also show writers for Gutfeld!. When Gutfeld is absent, Fox News personalities Shillue, Timpf, Tyrus, Machi, Dana Perino, Brian Kilmeade and Kennedy have served as guest hosts. Timpf and Tyrus have also been on hiatus periodically.

Notable and frequent guests included: Charlie Sheen, Donald Trump, Sherrod Small, Adam Carolla, Gad Saad, Jim Norton, Dagen McDowell, Guy Benson, Charles Hurt, Julie Banderas, Michele Tafoya, Kevin O'Leary, Penn Jillette, Mark Cuban, Jim Breuer, Tucker Carlson, Pete Hegseth, Jessica Tarlov, Larry Gatlin, Stephen Baldwin, Larry Kudlow, Kacie McDonnell, Steve Hilton, Lauren Chen, Curtis Sliwa, Will Cain, Bret Baier, Russell Brand, Sarah Palin, Lara Logan, Bill Hemmer, Eric Trump, Jim Florentine, Michael Malice, Spencer Pratt, Jamie Kennedy, Candace Owens, Kayleigh McEnany, Dean Cain, Nick Shirley, Bill Maher, JD Vance, Lara Trump, Harland Williams, Jillian Michaels, Big Show, Drew Pinsky and George Santos, among others. Political commentator Kennedy and comedian Michael Loftus (theloftusparty.com) also became frequent guests.

Roseanne Barr, Rob Schneider and Jeff Foxworthy have appeared as guests as well, each with stand-up comedy specials on Fox Nation. Additionally, Jon Taffer has been a guest, with Timpf joining him on an episode of Bar Rescue in June 2025. A frequent panelist, comedian and Trump impersonator Tyler Fischer (Mr. Birchum and Lady Ballers), was banned from the show after alleged harassment of a Fox News employee he claimed to have asked out for coffee.

== Background and production ==
The show previously aired on Saturday and Sunday nights at 10:00 p.m. ET as The Greg Gutfeld Show from its release on May 31, 2015, until March 13, 2021. In February 2021, Gutfeld announced that the show would move to weeknights at 11:00 p.m. ET. In March 2021, Gutfeld revealed that the weekday edition of the show would premiere on Monday, April 5, under the new title Gutfeld!. The final weekend episode of the show aired on March 13, 2021, and the first weekday episode aired on April 5, 2021.

Gutfeld! has been taped in front of a live studio audience in New York City since 2016, but because of NYC's COVID-19 restrictions, this was not possible for most of 2020 and 2021. In May 2022, Gutfeld revealed a new studio for the show, which more closely resembled traditional late-night talk shows. While the audience was small and meant to be somewhat intimate, the larger studio includes expanded room for attendees.

In the event of breaking news, Gutfeld! is preempted by an additional hour of Fox News @ Night, as was the case upon the beginning of Russia's invasion of Ukraine on February 23, 2022. As the extended Ukraine coverage continued for several weeks, rumors surfaced that the show might have been permanently cancelled. However, the show returned on Monday, March 14.

A "New King of Late Night" Super Bowl commercial aired during Super Bowl LVII on February 12, 2023. The 15-second ad featured Gutfeld (with his pet dog Gus), Tyrus and Timpf via Fox News. Gutfeld also went on tour with other show regulars and surprise guests, ranking 4.5 out of 5 based on audience reviews via the independent show guide New York City Theatre.

During the 2023 Writers Guild of America strike, Gutfeld! was not affected with all of the other late-night shows including The Late Show with Stephen Colbert, Jimmy Kimmel Live!, The Tonight Show Starring Jimmy Fallon, Late Night with Seth Meyers and The Daily Show halting production. This was mainly attributed to the smaller Gutfeld! staff compared to its competition, and because none of them were members of the WGA before or during the strike.

On June 26, 2023, Fox News announced that Gutfeld! would move to 10 p.m. ET beginning July 17, 2023, as part of a larger realignment of its prime time schedule. This meant the show would no longer compete with other late-night talk shows.

The success of the show resulted in Fox News debuting a new comedy program called Fox News Saturday Night in June 2023, which had regular panelists Tyrus, Timpf, Shillue and Kennedy serve as interim hosts before Jimmy Failla became the permanent host. Failla previously appeared as a guest and performed stand-up comedy on Gutfeld!.

The 200th episode of Gutfeld! aired Monday October 12, 2026. It was scheduled for Friday October 9, but didn't air due to breaking news. Other Friday shows have aired the following Monday, with guests being introduced first unlike other weekday episodes.

== Format and segments ==
Gutfeld! opens with an episode title, usually a humorous phrase, similar to Conan. The show has five blocks, with commercial breaks in between each one. The show starts off with a monologue, and after introducing all the panelists, Gutfeld asks the guests questions relating to the monologue (including interviews with celebrities). On Fridays, the panelists are introduced at the beginning of the show. Common punch lines and catchphrases are "Period!" and "A Racist (or Sexist) Would Say!" with large onscreen intertitles identical to the Gutfeld! logo (in all caps).

A majority of episodes include segments such as "Greg's Leftovers", when Gutfeld reads jokes that were not used in the show for the week. Another regular segment is "A Story in Five Words", with a news story being summarized in five words. Other occasional blocks may be local news, with panelists sharing news stories from where they are from; the audience deciding the story, when two stories are told and whichever gets bigger applause wins and gets to be the topic of the block; "Mailing It In" ("Gutfeld! Viewer Mail") on Fridays, when Gutfeld reads questions from fans and the panel answers the question; "Greg’s Animal Friends", when the panelists each select an animal-related video to share; and "Mock It And Move On", when Gutfeld introduces two unusual and outrageous news stories or events, then gets each of the panelists to analyze it, often in a comedic or sarcastic manner.

Additional and less frequent blocks have included: "5 More Words", "Video of the Day", "Greg's Fashion Corner", "Should We Be Concerned?", "What's Wrong with These People?", "Too Gross for Us", "Greg's Romance Corner", "We Don't Deserve Him" (about Donald Trump), "Guess the Crime", "Picture of the Day", "The Poo Detective", "The Science Corner" and others. Gutfeld often criticizes or praises politicians and fellow talk show hosts during episodes. In August 2025, he happily appeared as a guest on The Tonight Show Starring Jimmy Fallon.

Regular panelists, guests, writers and producers have performed various characters on the show, including Kat Timpf (co-host/contributor), Joe DeVito (comedian/guest), Gene Nelson (producer/writer) and Joe Machi (comedian/writer). Tom Shillue has notably participated in sketch comedy, including impersonations of Joe Biden and Adam Schiff, as well as "Angry White Male". Tyrus, referred to as Greg Gutfeld's "massive sidekick", would do skits such as "Angry Black Male". When asked how he was discovered for the show, Tyrus said, "I was just messing around on Twitter one day and I said to Greg about one of the jokes on his show, 'I got it. It took me a minute but I got it.' He said, 'You know I've watched you. You're a pretty funny guy. Have you ever thought about coming on and doing the show?' I was like, 'Are you serious?!' He was like, 'Yeah, I'll give you a shot.'"

== Ratings and viewership ==
In August 2021, Gutfeld! overtook The Late Show in the nightly ratings, becoming the highest rated late-night talk show in the United States. In January 2022, it averaged 2.12 million nightly viewers, more than The Late Show, The Tonight Show and Jimmy Kimmel Live!. Since the start of the new weekday format, the show saw a 23 percent increase in total viewers, and a more significant 25 percent increase in the key demographic of adults aged 18–49. In October 2022, the show had its highest rated episode with a record 2.5 million viewers, beating every show in late night TV.

From November 2022 through early 2023, the show averaged around 2.5 million viewers, making it the most watched late-night show in the United States, a position it has held since August of that year.

Following Fox News firing 8:00 p.m. ET host Tucker Carlson in April 2023, the network saw a significant drop in viewership across all of its shows. Gutfeld! averaged between 1.5–1.8 million viewers per night, still beating its competitors.

In October 2023, the program entered into another hiatus following the Gaza war, similar to when the Russian invasion of Ukraine started. It returned on October 16, 2023, following a week-long break.

The show averaged 2.2 million viewers in the first quarter of 2024, and led all of cable news in prime time in the younger demo for the full quarter for the first time in the program’s history, reaching double digit increases over the first quarter of 2023.

In May 2024, Gutfeld! was watched by an average of 2.9 million viewers, with the appearance of comedian Bill Maher. It also outperformed all other liberal late-night talk shows and cable news, including key demo.

On July 15, 2024, the show had its highest rated episode, notching 3.6 million viewers. This was the first episode after the attempted assassination of Donald Trump in Pennsylvania, and its first live broadcast at the 2024 Republican National Convention.

On September 18, 2024, former President Donald Trump appeared as a guest along with Gutfeld, Timpf, Tyrus and Emily Compagno. It was the show's highest rated episode to date, bringing in 4.9 million viewers.

Gutfeld! was the second most popular show on Fox News and 34th overall on TV, with nearly 3.2 million viewers by early May 2026 (down about 3% from the previous week).

== See also ==
- The ½ Hour News Hour
- Red Eye

Preceded by Hannity	Gutfeld! 10:00 p.m. – 11:00 p.m.	Succeeded by Fox News @ Night
