= Joe DeVito =

American comedian and writer (born 1968)

Joe DeVito (born December 1, 1968) is a stand-up comedian and writer living on Long Island, New York.

== Education ==
DeVito is a 1990 graduate of Fairfield University where he was a writer and editor for the Fairfield Mirror.

== Career ==
In 2006, DeVito was featured on Comedy Central's Live at Gotham and appeared at the Montreal "Just for Laughs" comedy festival in the New Faces program. In 2007, he was a semifinalist on NBC's Last Comic Standing season 5. He has also appeared on The Late Late Show with Craig Ferguson on CBS, Animal Planet and CNN.

DeVito's debut album is called First Date with Joe DeVito.

Since 2020, DeVito has been a frequent panelist guest on the late-night talk show Gutfeld! on Fox News (formerly known as The Greg Gutfeld Show). He also makes brief appearances on the show from time to time to play guitar for short musical comedy segments.
