= List of Jewish-American journalists =

This is a list of notable Jewish-American journalists. For other Jewish Americans, see Lists of Jewish Americans.

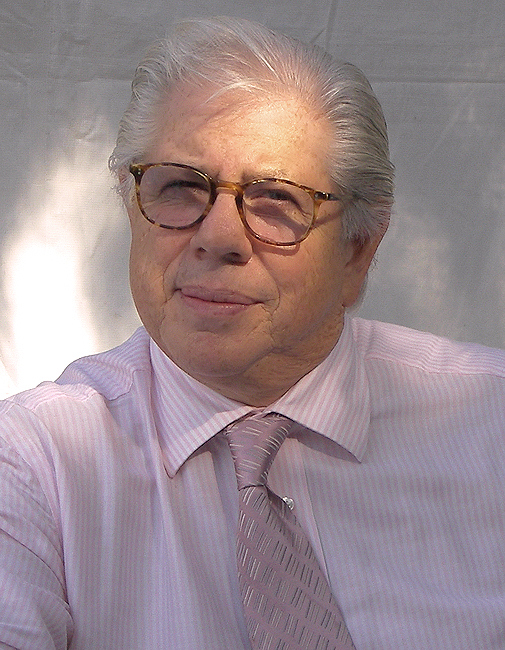
Carl Bernstein

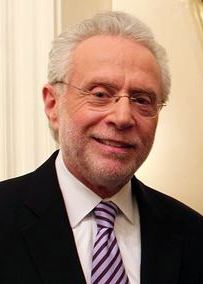
Wolf Blitzer

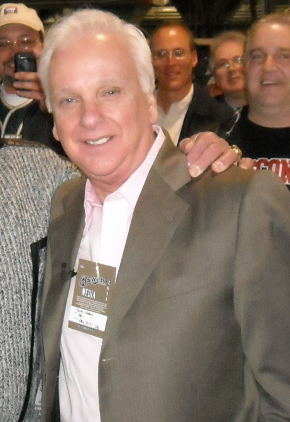
Bernie Goldberg

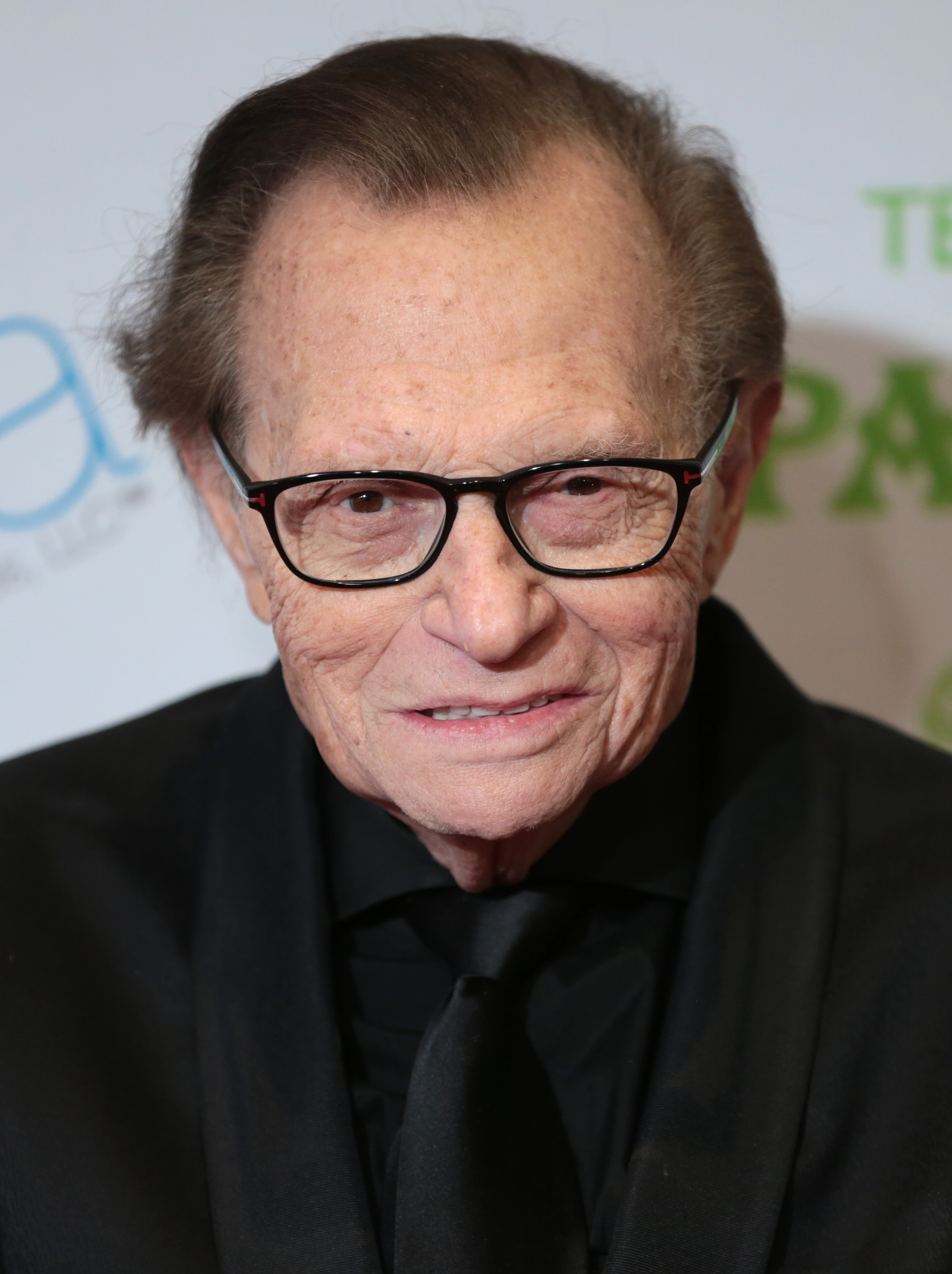
Larry King

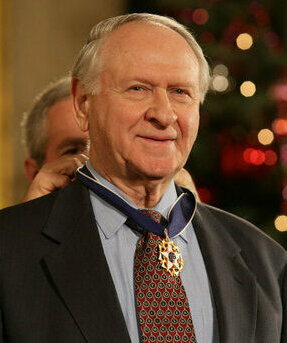
William Safire

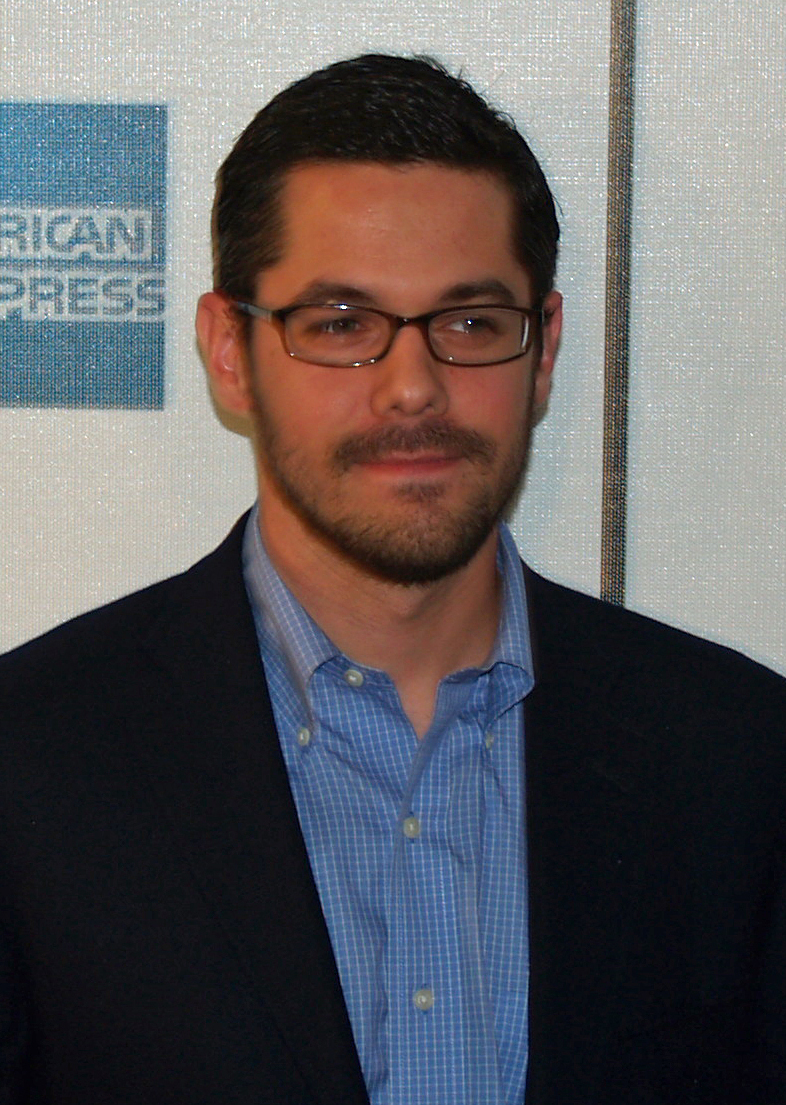
Gideon Yago

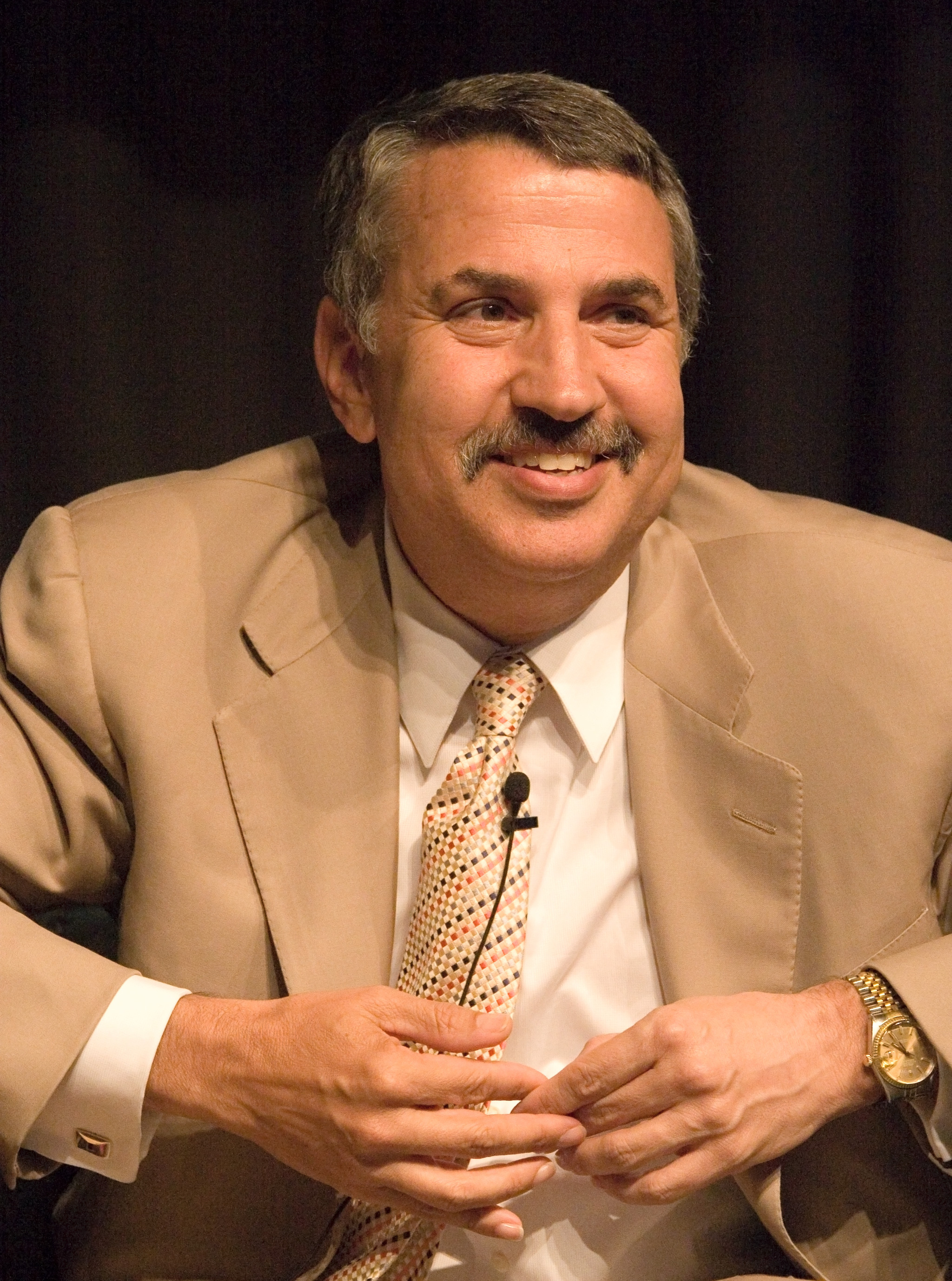
Thomas Friedman

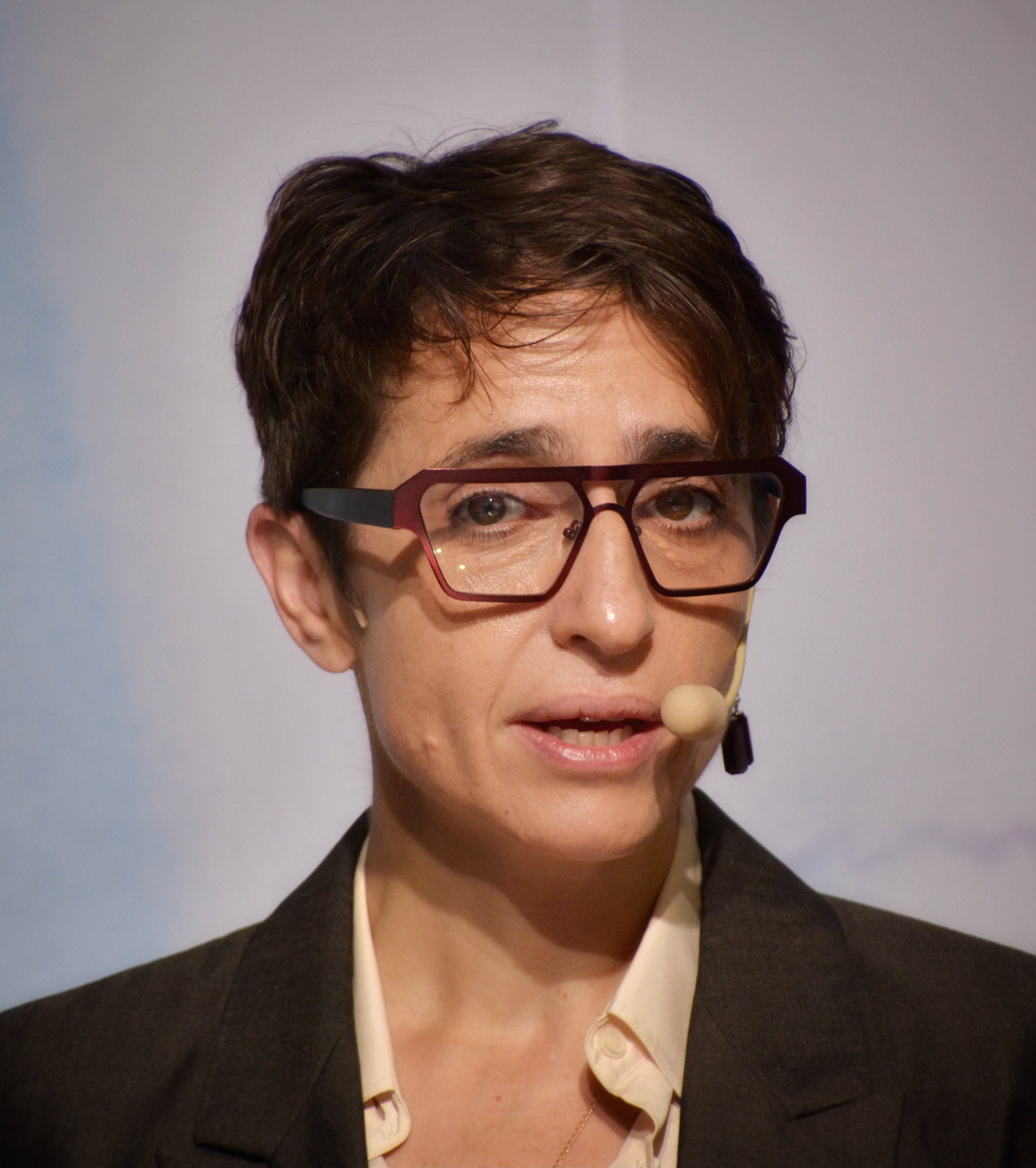
Masha Gessen

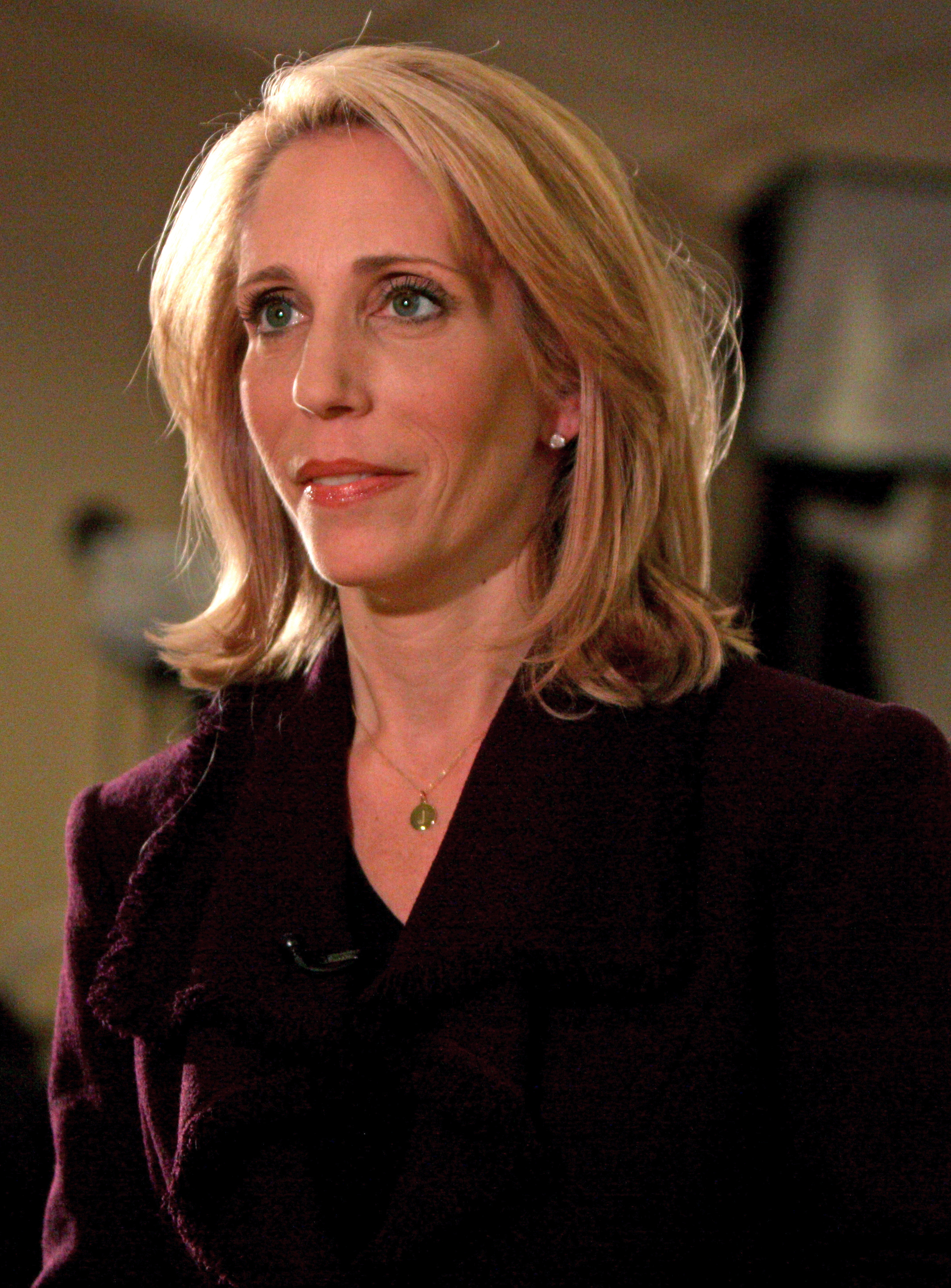
Dana Bash

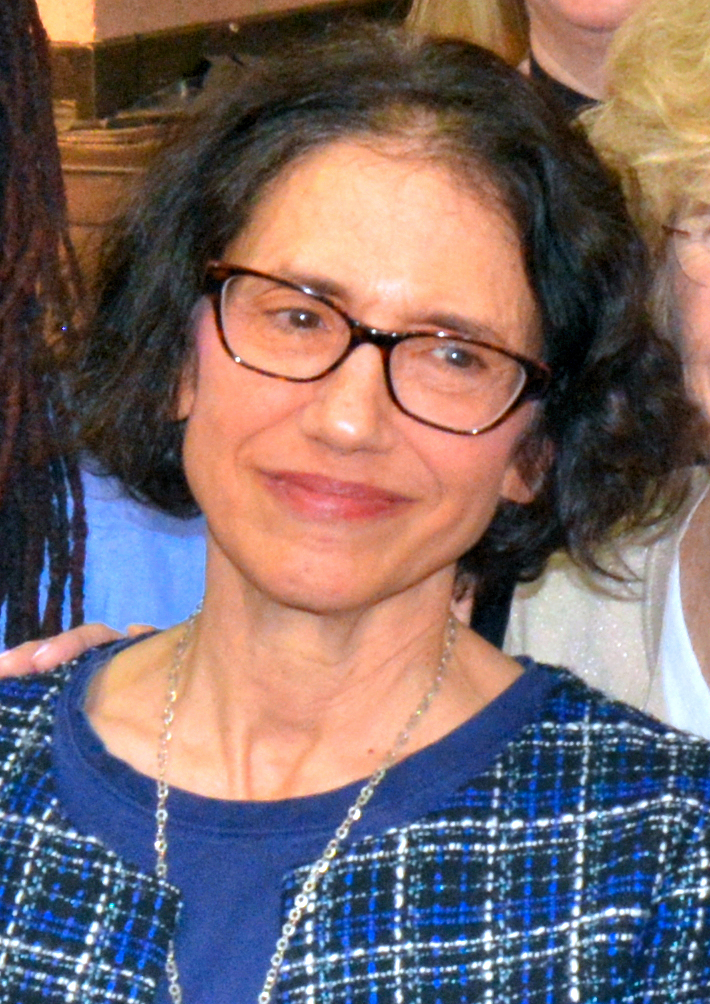
Jennifer Rubin

== A–C ==
- Jill Abramson (born 1954), journalist and former executive editor of The New York Times
- Renata Adler (born 1937), former staff writer for The New Yorker and film critic for The New York Times
- Martin Agronsky (1915–1999), reporter and host of Agronsky & Company
- Peter Alexander (born 1976), journalist
- Jonathan Alter (born 1957), columnist and senior editor for Newsweek
- David A. Andelman (born 1944), journalist
- Anne Applebaum (born 1964), journalist
- Martin Baron (born 1954), former editor of The Washington Post and The Boston Globe
- Dana Bash (born 1971), political correspondent at CNN
- Emily Bazelon (born 1971)
- Peter Beinart (born 1971), columnist, journalist, and political commentator
- John Berman (born 1972), anchor at CNN
- Bonnie Bernstein (born 1970), sports journalist
- Carl Bernstein (born 1944), former investigative reporter for The Washington Post; known for his reporting on the Watergate scandal with Bob Woodward
- Nadia Bilchik (born 1964), anchor at CNN
- Wolf Blitzer (born 1948), journalist and anchor at CNN
- Kate Bolduan (born 1983), journalist at CNN
- Max Boot (born 1969), columnist, journalist, and political commentator
- Gloria Borger (born 1952), journalist at CNN
- Nellie Bowles, journalist at Vice News, The Guardian, The New York Times
- David S. Broder (1929–2011), Pulitzer Prize–winning columnist for The Washington Post
- David Brooks (born 1961), columnist, The New York Times
- Michael Brooks (1983–2020), co-host of The Majority Report with Sam Seder and host of The Michael Brooks Show
- Ron Brownstein (born 1958), senior political analyst at CNN
- Samuel Burke (born 1985/1986), former anchor at CNN International and CNN en Español
- Irin Carmon (born 1983/1984), senior correspondent at New York
- Jonathan Chait, writer for New York magazine, former senior editor at The New Republic and former assistant editor of The American Prospect
- Juju Chang (born 1965), journalist at ABC News, anchor of Nightline
- Mona Charen (born 1957), journalist
- David Chalian (born 1973), journalist and political director at CNN
- Jean Chatzky (born 1964), journalist and personal-finance columnist; financial editor of NBC's Today show
- Sarah Chayes (born 1962), former reporter for National Public Radio
- Allan Chernoff, former senior correspondent at CNN
- Benyamin Cohen (born 1975), founder of Jewsweek and American Jewish Life Magazine
- Dan Cohen (born 1984 or 1985), journalist and contributor for Al Jazeera English, Alternet, Electronic Intifada, The Grayzone, Middle East Eye, Mondoweiss, The Nation, Vice News, MintPress News
- Elizabeth Cohen, journalist and senior medical correspondent at CNN
- David Corn (born 1959), Washington, D.C. bureau chief for Mother Jones
- Howard Cosell (1918–1995), sports journalist, author, and lawyer; known for his tenure on ABC's Monday Night Football
- Katie Couric (born 1957), journalist; serves as Yahoo! Global News Anchor; has worked with all Big Three television networks in the United States, and in her early career was an assignment editor at CNN

== D–G ==
- Benjamin De Casseres (1873–1945), early 20th-century journalist, critic and individualist anarchist
- Daniel Dale (born 1985), CNN
- Morton Dean (born 1935), CBS News reporter
- Tony Dokoupil (born 1980), CBS News
- Matt Drudge (born 1966), founder of the Drudge Report
- Harry Enten (born 1988), senior political writer and analyst for FiveThirtyEight, senior writer and analyst for CNN Politics
- Preston Fassel, entertainment journalist and former staff writer for Fangoria magazine
- Danny Fenster (born 1984), managing editor of Frontier Myanmar
- Giselle Fernández (born 1961), host of Access Hollywood
- Franklin Foer (born 1974), staff writer at The Atlantic and former editor of The New Republic
- David Folkenflik (born 1969), media correspondent for National Public Radio
- Max Frankel (born 1930), executive editor of The New York Times
- Thomas Friedman (born 1953), columnist, The New York Times
- Jamie Gangel (born 1955), CNN, NBC News
- Bob Garfield, NPR and ABC News journalist, columnist, and author
- Evan Gershkovich (born 1991), Wall Street Journal journalist who was arrested and falsely accused of spying in Russia
- Masha Gessen (born 1967), staff writer for The New Yorker
- Brooke Gladstone (born 1955), Peabody Award-winning NPR journalist and author
- Susan Glasser (born 1969), staff writer at The New Yorker
- Hadas Gold (born 1988), CNN
- Bernard Goldberg (born 1945), CBS News reporter
- Jeffrey Goldberg (born 1965), journalist, staff writer for The New Yorker and author of the book Prisoners
- Jonah Goldberg (born 1969), columnist, commentator and Senior Editor of National Review
- Michelle Goldberg (born 1975)
- Julianna Goldman (born 1981), CBS News correspondent based in Washington, D.C.
- Bianna Golodryga (born 1978), journalist at CNN
- Amy Goodman (born 1957), Democracy Now!
- Peter Greenberg (born 1950), CBS News Travel Editor
- Linda Greenhouse (born 1947), Pulitzer Prize-winning reporter for The New York Times
- Glenn Greenwald (born 1967) journalist, cofounder of The Intercept
- David Gregory (born 1970), CNN and MSNBC
- Edwin O. Guthman (1919–2008), Pulitzer Prize-winning reporter for The Seattle Times

== H–M ==
- Clyde Haberman (born 1945)
- Maggie Haberman (born 1973), White House correspondent for The New York Times, political analyst for CNN, previously political reporter for the New York Post, New York Daily News, and Politico
- David Halberstam (1934–2007), Vietnam War correspondent
- Mark Halperin (born 1965), Newsmax TV, ABC News, MSNBC
- David Harsanyi (born 1970/1971), National Review editor
- Seymour Hersh (born 1937), investigative journalist, uncovered the 1968 My Lai massacre
- Mickey Herskowitz (born 1933), sportswriter and columnist for the Houston Post and the Houston Chronicle
- Christopher Hitchens (1949–2011), literary critic and political activist
- Elie Honig (born 1977), senior legal analyst for CNN
- Stella Inger (born 1982), journalist, CBS News, ABC News
- Sarah Isgur, (born 1982) The Dispatch
- Michael Isikoff (born 1952), investigative journalist
- Julia Ioffe (born 1982), journalist for GQ
- Jeff Jacoby (1959-), columnist for The Boston Globe
- Rebecca Jarvis (born 1981), chief business, economics, and technology correspondent for ABC News
- Eliana Johnson (born 1984), Washington editor for the National Review
- Molly Jong-Fast (born 1978)
- Ben Joravsky (born 1955), newspaper columnist, non-fiction book writer
- Joseph Kahn (born 1964), executive editor of The New York Times
- Jodi Kantor (born 1975), The New York Times
- Tamara Keith (born 1979), NPR
- James Kirchick (born 1983), The New Republic, Radio Free Europe/Radio Liberty, The New York Sun, the New York Daily News, and The Hill
- John King (born 1963), CNN
- Larry King (1933–2021), RT America and CNN host
- Ezra Klein (born 1984), journalist, blogger, political commentator; co-founder and editor-at-large of Vox
- Joe Klein (born 1946), columnist for Time magazine
- Rick Klein (born 1976/1977), political director for ABC News
- Beth Kobliner (born 1965), personal-finance commentator and journalist
- Charles Krauthammer (1950–2018), columnist and commentator for Fox News and The Washington Post
- Howard Kurtz (1953), host of Media Buzz on Fox News, former media writer for The Washington Post, and former Washington bureau chief for The Daily Beast
- Mark Leibovich (born 1965), staff writer for The Atlantic
- Cynthia Leive (born 1967), Glamour
- Joe Lelyveld (1937–2024), executive editor of The New York Times
- Carl Leubsdorf (born 1938), columnist for The Dallas Morning News
- Mark Levin (born 1957), lawyer, author, and radio personality
- Eric Lichtblau (born 1965), The New York Times, Los Angeles Times, Time magazine, The New Yorker, and CNN
- Franz Lidz (born 1951), Sports Illustrated, Smithsonian
- Jon Lovett (born 1982), Crooked Media
- Dave Marash (born 1942), former Washington-based anchor for Al Jazeera English
- Ruth Marcus (born 1958), journalist
- Ari Melber (born 1980), chief legal correspondent for MSNBC and host of The Beat with Ari Melber
- Suzy Menkes (born 1943), fashion journalist
- Dana Milbank (born 1968), The Washington Post
- Ira Victor Morris (1903–1972)

== N–R ==
- Edwin Newman (1919–2010), NBC News journalist, Broadway theatre critic, non-fiction book writer
- David Pakman (born 1984), political pundit and academic; host of the syndicated political program The David Pakman Show
- Pamela Paul (born 1970/1971), editor of The New York Times Book Review
- Daniel Pearl (1963–2002), murdered foreign correspondent, The Wall Street Journal
- John Podhoretz (born 1961), writer, editor of Commentary, columnist for the New York Post, author of several books on politics
- Abigail Pogrebin (born 1965), journalist for Tablet
- Letty Cottin Pogrebin (born 1939), founding editor of Ms.
- Lynn Povich (born 1943), journalist and senior editor for Newsweek
- Shirley Povich (1905–1998), sports columnist and reporter for The Washington Post
- Joshua Prager (born 1971), journalist and writer for Vanity Fair, The New York Times, and The Wall Street Journal
- Nathan Rabin (born 1976), music and pop-culture journalist
- Catherine Rampell (born 1984), opinion journalist and nationally syndicated opinion columnist
- Marcus Eli Ravage (1884–1965), biographer, essayist and journalist, who served as European correspondent for the U.S. magazine The Nation, and contributed to Harper's Magazine, The New Republic, Current History, The Forward, The New York Times, The Saturday Evening Post, the humor magazine Puck, The Century Magazine, the British newspaper The Nation and various European publications, e.g., Neues Wiener Tagblatt, Le Petit Parisien, Ce soir and Vu
- David Remnick (born 1958), former Moscow correspondent for The Washington Post, editor of The New Yorker
- Frank Rich (born 1949), columnist, New York
- Geraldo Rivera (born 1943), investigative television journalist and host, now with Fox News
- Steven V. Roberts (born 1943), Washington pundit and U.S. News & World Report contributor
- Lester Rodney (1911–2009), journalist; helped break down the color barrier in baseball
- Josh Rogin (born 1978/1979), foreign-policy columnist for the Global Opinions section of The Washington Post and a political analyst for CNN
- Hilary Rosen (born 1958), The Washington Post, The Huffington Post
- A.M. Rosenthal (1922–2006), executive editor of The New York Times
- Richard Roth (born 1955), CNN
- David Rothkopf (born 1955), journalist
- Jennifer Rubin (born 1962), columnist, The Washington Post, Commentary, PJ Media, Human Events, The Weekly Standard

== S–T ==
- William Safire (1929–2009), columnist for The New York Times
- Robert J. Samuelson (born 1945), columnist, The Washington Post
- Kasriel Hirsch Sarasohn (1835–1905), founder of Jewish Weekly, Jewish Gazette, and Jewish Daily News
- Michael Savage (born 1942), radio host, author, and conservative political commentator
- Jessica Savitch (1946–1983), NBC News
- Michael S. Schmidt (born 1983), correspondent for The New York Times
- Douglas Schoen (born 1953), political analyst and commentator for Fox News and Newsmax TV
- Daniel Schorr (1916–2010), journalist who covered the world for more than 60 years, last as a senior news analyst for NPR
- Sam Seder (born 1966), Air America Radio, The Majority Report
- George Seldes (1890–1995), World War I correspondent, post-war international reporter and media critic
- Ben Shapiro (born 1984), conservative political commentator, public speaker, author, and lawyer
- Jeff Sharlet (born 1972), contributing editor for Harper's, Virginia Quarterly Review, and Rolling Stone
- Jake Sherman (born 1985), co-founder of Punchbowl News, journalist for NBC News, Politico, MSNBC
- S.L. Shneiderman (1906–1996), Polish-American journalist, writer, and poet
- David Shuster (born 1967), television journalist; former anchor for MSNBC; worked for Fox News, CNN, Current TV, and Al Jazeera America
- Joel Siegel (1943–2007), film critic
- Nate Silver (born 1978), writer who analyzes baseball and elections, founder and editor-in-chief of FiveThirtyEight, Special Correspondent for ABC News
- Ken Silverstein (born 1958), founder of CounterPunch, writer for Harper's Magazine, Mother Jones, The Nation, Salon.com, Slate, The American Prospect and Washington Monthly
- Jesse Singal, writer for New York magazine, The New York Times and The Atlantic
- Ben Smith (born 1976), media columnist at The New York Times and editor-in-chief of BuzzFeed News
- Jacob Soboroff (born 1983), NBC News and MSNBC
- Andrew Ross Sorkin (born 1977), financial columnist for The New York Times and a co-anchor of CNBC's Squawk Box
- Lesley Stahl (born 1941), CBS reporter and correspondent for 60 Minutes
- Susan Stamberg (born 1938), co-host of NPR's All Things Considered
- Joel Stein (born 1971), columnist, Los Angeles Times
- Gloria Steinem (1934–2026) feminist editor and writer, founder of Ms. magazine
- Bret Stephens (born 1973), journalist, editor, and columnist, since April 2017 at The New York Times and June 2017 as a senior contributor to NBC News.
- Katherine Stewart, The Village Voice
- Eli Stokols (born 1978/1979), White House reporter for the Los Angeles Times
- I. F. Stone (1907–1989), left-wing Washington correspondent and investigative journalist, NY Post, PM, The Nation and I.F. Stone's Weekly
- Jonathan Swan (born 1985), political reporter for Axios
- Jake Tapper (born 1969), CNN anchor and correspondent
- Jessica Tarlov (born 1985), Fox News
- Chuck Todd (born 1972), NBC
- Katy Tur (born 1983), journalist and anchor for MSNBC
- Zoey Tur (born 1960), journalist
- Jake Turx (born 1986), senior White House correspondent and chief political correspondent for the magazine Ami.
- Josh Tyrangiel (born 1972), journalist, managing editor of TIME magazine, editor at Bloomberg Businessweek, managing director of Vice News

== U–Z ==
- Batya Ungar-Sargon (born 1981), deputy opinion editor of Newsweek, former opinion editor of The Forward
- Chris Wallace (born 1947), journalist, Fox News
- Mike Wallace (1918–2012), journalist, 60 Minutes correspondent
- Barbara Walters (1929–2022), media personality, a regular fixture on morning television shows (Today and The View), evening news magazines (20/20), and on The ABC Evening News, as the first female evening news anchor
- Sharon Waxman (born c. 1963), journalist
- Miriam Weiner, Jewish genealogist who wrote syndicated "Roots and Branches" column that was published in 100+ Jewish newspapers and periodicals
- Tim Weiner (born 1956), Pulitzer Prize winning investigative reporter, historian of the CIA and the Cold War.
- Bari Weiss (born 1984), opinion writer and editor
- Marco Werman, radio journalist and host of PRI's The World
- Emily Wilder (born 1998/1999), journalist at Associated Press, fired for pro-Palestinian tweets
- Walter Winchell (1897–1972), investigative broadcast journalist and gossip columnist
- Michael Wolff (born 1953), journalist/columnist, USA Today, The Hollywood Reporter
- Gideon Yago (born 1978), MTV reporter
- Robert Zelnick (1940–2019), The Christian Science Monitor, National Public Radio, Anchorage Daily News
- Dave Zirin (born 1974), sports editor for The Nation
- David Zurawik (born 1949), TV and media critic at The Baltimore Sun
