= The Sunday Briefing =

American TV news program

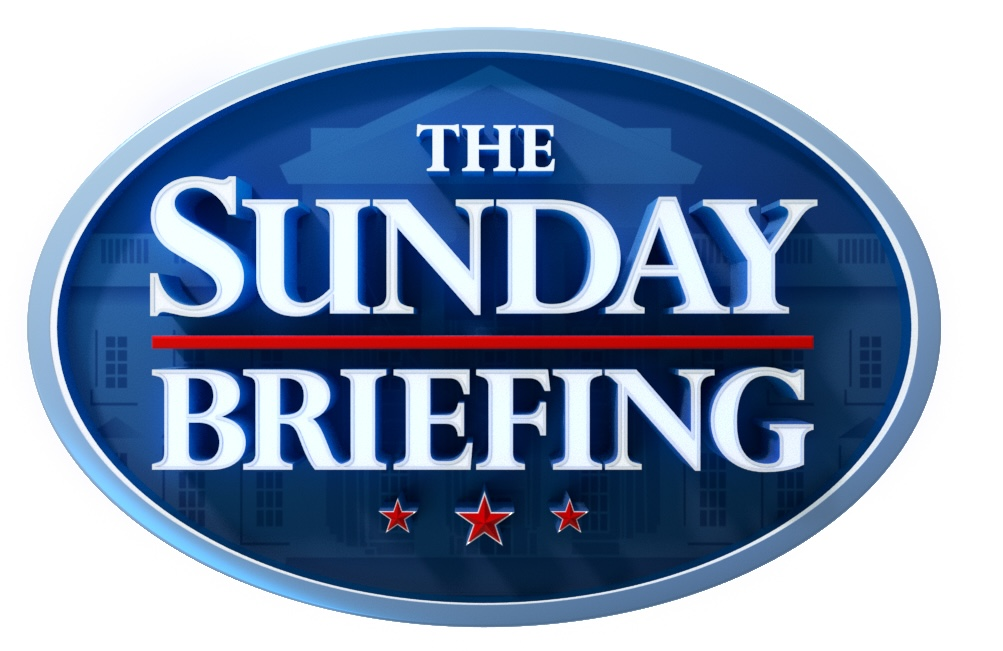
- Genre: News program
- Created by: Suzanne Scott
- Presented by: Peter Doocy; Jacqui Heinrich
- Country of origin: United States
- Original language: English
- No. of seasons: 1
- No. of episodes: 1

Production
- Production location: Washington, D.C.
- Camera setup: Multi-camera
- Running time: 60 minutes

Original release
- Network: Fox News Channel
- Release: September 21, 2025 – present

The Sunday Briefing is an hour-long news program on the Fox News Channel co-anchored by Peter Doocy and Jacqui Heinrich. The show airs live on Sunday mornings at 11:00 a.m. ET, and discusses that week's current events and key moments from the week in the Trump Administration.

== Hosts ==
The program is co-anchored by Doocy and Heinrich, who currently serve as the senior White House Correspondent's for Fox News on an alternating weekend basis.

- Peter Doocy: (2025–present) Doocy has covered every major political election since 2009 as well as reported live from major breaking news events across the country. During the 2024 election cycle, Doocy covered incumbent President Joe Biden campaign, providing updates from the election trail and 1600 Pennsylvania Avenue. Doocy led coverage of Biden's 2020 presidential campaign beginning with his April 2019 candidacy announcement.
- Jacqui Heinrich: (2025–present) Heinrich is also a co-host for Fox News Radio on The FOX News Rundown podcast. Fox News in September 2018 as general assignment reporter based in New York.

== Format & History ==
Each anchor will tackle all facets of the White House beat, including the President of the United States' national and international moves as well as the key issues impacting the administration. Heinrich and Doocy have covered the White House since 2021, reporting extensively on both the Biden and Trump administrations and consistently asking questions that drive the news cycle.

Fox News announced on September 10, 2025 that Doocy and Heinrich would be taking on the role of anchoring The Sunday Briefing following the cancellation of Media Buzz hosted by Howard Kurtz who had helmed the 11 a.m. hour on Sunday for over 12 years.

The show's first ever guest was President Donald Trump who was interviewed by Doocy.

Preceded by Sunday Morning Futures w/ Maria Bartiromo	The Sunday Briefing; 11:00 AM ET – 12:00 PM ET	Succeeded by Fox News Live
