= Shalom Landau =

American Haredi rabbi

- שלום לנדא
- Title: Rabbi, Rosh Yeshiva, Av Beis Din

Personal life
- Born: c. 1978 Kiryas Joel, New York, United States
- Parent: Rabbi Yosef Dov Landau (father)
- Notable work: Shalom Nafshi (2025)
- Education: Traditional yeshiva education
- Occupation: Rabbi, educator, author
- Relatives: Rabbi Moshe Landau (brother); Rabbi Menachem Dovid Landau (brother); Joel Landau (brother)
- Website: rivnitz.com

Religious life
- Religion: Orthodox Judaism
- Denomination: Hasidic Judaism (Satmar)
- Ordination: Yoreh Yoreh (ritual law); Yadin Yadin (jurisprudence)

Senior posting
- Teacher: Rav Leibush Teitelbaum; Rav Avrohom Hirsh Wosner
- Organization: Mosdos Rivnitz; Beis Din Ladun Velehoros; Kollel Ladun Velehoros
- Residence: Williamsburg, Brooklyn, New York

Rabbi Shalom Landau (Hebrew: שלום לנדא; born c. 1978) is an American Hasidic rabbi, educator, and religious leader based in Williamsburg, Brooklyn. He serves as the Rosh Yeshivah and Rosh Kollel of Mosdos Rivnitz and has gained recognition for his Torah teachings on social media platforms, where he addresses topics including faith, purpose, marriage, and personal development from a Hasidic perspective.

== Early life and family ==
Rabbi Landau was born and raised in Kiryas Joel, New York, in a Satmar Hasidic family. He is the son of Rabbi Yosef Dov Landau, known as the Zlotchover Rav, who serves as a rabbi in Kiryas Joel with his own synagogue. His father was born in Israel and later became a student of the Satmar Rebbe, Rabbi Yoel Teitelbaum. The family maintains that they are seventh-generation descendants of Rabbi Yechiel Michel of Zlotshov (1726–1786), a student of the Baal Shem Tov and a foundational figure in early Hasidic tradition.

Growing up in Kiryas Joel, Landau did not attend English classes, viewing them as "bittul Torah" (waste of Torah study time). He initially aspired to remain in full-time Torah learning his entire life, despite his grandfather's encouragement to learn English for practical purposes.

Landau has several siblings who have also become communal leaders: Rabbi Moshe Landau, an educator in Williamsburg who directs family heritage projects; Rabbi Menachem Dovid (Mordechai Leib) Landau, a yeshiva founder in Kiryas Joel; and Joel Landau, a businessman and philanthropist who supports Satmar institutions.

The Landau family preserves their ancestor's legacy through the Machon Zecher L'Avraham (Mercaz Mosdos Zlotshov Yampoli), which publishes the Maggid of Zlotshov's works and maintains a yeshiva at his gravesite in Yampoli, Ukraine.

== Rabbinic and educational work ==
=== Beis Din Ladun Velehoros ===
Landau serves as Av Beis Din (head of rabbinical court) of the Beis Din Ladun Velehoros in Williamsburg, where he adjudicates complex financial disputes, mediates business conflicts, and provides halachic guidance on matters ranging from business ethics to family law. His background in business and technology informs his approach to contemporary commercial disputes under Jewish law.

=== Kollel Ladun Velehoros ===
Around 2010, Landau founded the Kollel Ladun Velehoros, an innovative adult learning program that welcomes both career professionals seeking to deepen their Torah knowledge and traditional yeshiva scholars. The institution was created to provide a pathway for businessmen and professionals, including those who had careers in technology, real estate, and other fields to pursue advanced Torah study and rabbinical ordination.

The kollel operates on a distinctive model where former businessmen study alongside lifelong Torah scholars, creating what Landau describes as productive cross-pollination. According to a 2026 profile in Ami Magazine, the program emphasizes Choshen Mishpat (business law), where real-world commercial experience proves particularly valuable. The kollel has ordained more than 60 rabbis in dayanus (rabbinical jurisprudence).

== Mosdos Rivnitz ==
Landau's institutions bear the name Rivnitz (also spelled Ribnitz), in honor of the Ribnitzer Rebbe, Rabbi Chaim Zanvl Abramowitz (1902–1995). Landau's family had a close connection to the Ribnitzer Rebbe; his father built a mikvah for the Rebbe and the family frequently attended his services in Monsey, New York.

According to the Ami Magazine profile, the idea to establish a yeshiva and beis medrash in the Ribnitzer Rebbe's name came to both Landau and his brother Yoeli simultaneously during morning prayers. The institutions were established to honor the Rebbe's memory, as he had no children and no institutions previously bore his name.

Mosdos Rivnitz today encompasses three yeshivos and kollelim in Williamsburg, serving approximately 100 bachurim (yeshiva students) and more than 200 yungeleit (married scholars) across the institutions. Landau delivers regular shiurim (Torah lectures) to both groups and maintains more than a hundred regular congregants at his synagogue.

The institutions also run summer yeshiva programs in Monticello, New York, in the Catskill Mountains.

== Social media teachings ==
=== Development and reach ===
In 2024, students at Landau's yeshiva suggested recording and distributing his teachings online, initially as a fundraising effort for the institution. While Landau delivers his regular Torah lectures in Yiddish to his congregation, he gives frequent talks in English to groups of Bukharian and Syrian Jews who visit from other parts of Brooklyn seeking his counsel and blessings.

Beginning in July 2024, Landau's assistant Shraga Moshe Kalmanowitz began recording these English-language talks and editing them into short video clips for distribution on Instagram, TikTok, YouTube, and Facebook. The production was later outsourced to freelance editors who add graphics and stock footage to the clips.

As of April 2026, Landau's Instagram account had accumulated approximately 250,000 followers, with individual videos reaching millions of views. A May 2026 New York Times profile noted that his reach "greatly outnumber[s] the several hundred men who come to study and pray at his shul."

According to the Ami Magazine profile, the videos receive "thousands of messages every single day" from viewers seeking guidance. Landau's team has compiled a list of over a thousand individuals from around the world who have expressed interest in converting to Judaism after viewing his content.

Notably, Landau does not personally use social media and relies on a flip phone, avoiding phones entirely from Friday sundown to Saturday sundown in observance of Shabbat. He has stated that he does not watch his own videos and has expressed concern that the editing process may oversimplify his teachings by removing important Torah context.

=== Content and distribution policy ===
The videos address universal challenges including anxiety about finances, searching for life purpose, maintaining relationships, and finding spiritual meaning. While the content is derived from Hasidic philosophy and Torah sources, it is presented in accessible language that resonates with diverse audiences.

Landau maintains a strict policy regarding his Yiddish-language shiurim and drashos (sermons) delivered to his Hasidic congregation: these are not made available online, as he believes social media is inappropriate for his core community. "I don't allow it," he told Ami Magazine. "It is not meant for Yiddish speakers, who should not be online." He has expressed hope to eventually establish a telephone hotline where people can access his regular Torah lectures without internet access.

== Public role and media presence ==
Landau maintains an active online presence associated with the Rivnitz community, producing short teachings addressing topics such as faith, marriage dynamics, emotional resilience, and the Hasidic concept of tafkid (life mission). His content circulates widely among both Orthodox and formerly Orthodox audiences.

Landau’s short Torah video teachings, which address practical topics such as personal resilience, relationships, and life advice, have attracted attention beyond traditional Orthodox audiences. According to a report in Jewish Insider, some commentators from diverse online communities have shared and engaged with his content, including individuals not primarily affiliated with Orthodox Judaism and figures in the technology sector. This attention highlights the broader circulation of his teachings on social media.

In October 2025, New York Assembly Member Zohran Mamdani visited Landau's sukkah in Williamsburg as part of outreach to Satmar communities. Media coverage noted Landau’s visibility and online influence.

=== Digital audience and reception ===
According to The New York Times, Landau’s social media audience includes a wide range of viewers, including practicing Jews, secular audiences, and non-Jews seeking religious or philosophical insights. His videos have been interpreted differently by various groups, with some audiences engaging with them as traditional religious teachings and others viewing them through the lens of contemporary self-help or online culture.

The report also noted that his content has resonated particularly with younger audiences and that his online following numbers in the hundreds of thousands.

== Themes and style ==
Landau's teachings emphasize the Hasidic concept of tafkid (each person's unique mission or purpose in life). Drawing on his own experience of career transformation, he frequently addresses themes of discovering one's calling and living authentically rather than conforming to others' expectations.

Other recurring themes include:

Trust in Divine Providence: Addressing modern anxieties about money and success through the framework of emunah and bitachon (faith and trust in God).

Marriage and relationships: Teachings on emotional connection, communication between spouses, and understanding gender dynamics from a traditional Jewish perspective.

Shabbat observance: Framing Shabbat not as restriction but as weekly spiritual restoration and family connection.

Parenting and education: Critiques of rigid educational systems and advocacy for recognizing each child's individual nature and strengths.

Purpose versus pleasure: Distinguishing between temporary satisfaction and lasting fulfillment through meaningful work.

Resilience and perseverance: Drawing on his experience of facing skepticism during his career transition to encourage others pursuing difficult changes.

Landau's teaching style is characterized by direct, plainspoken language and practical application of ancient wisdom to contemporary challenges. His videos often begin with provocative statements such as "Wealth is in your wiring, not in your wallet" or "A child is not a second chance at your past" before connecting these ideas to traditional Torah sources.

In the Ami Magazine interview, Landau explained his approach: "My tafkid is to help a person find his own tafkid in life. I believe I understand people, and I try to see what each individual needs so he won't feel empty anymore."

== Audience and reception ==
=== Diverse viewership ===
Landau's audience spans multiple demographics. His core following includes Orthodox Jews seeking spiritual deepening, Sephardic communities (particularly Bukharian and Syrian Jews) who attend his talks in person, and formerly Orthodox individuals who maintain connections to Jewish wisdom traditions.

The New York Times reported that his content has also attracted "secular internet addicts who take his videos with a heavy dose of irony; curious non-Jews seeking a pure form of religious authenticity; young conservatives attracted to the traditional gender roles he preaches; and commenters who make antisemitic jokes about Jews holding the secret to attaining material wealth."

According to Jewish Insider, Landau's content has gained traction in unexpected online communities, including among technology sector professionals and individuals not primarily affiliated with Orthodox Judaism.

=== Political attention ===
In October 2025, New York Assembly Member Zohran Mamdani, then a candidate for New York City mayor, visited Landau's sukkah in Williamsburg as part of outreach to Satmar Hasidic communities. The visit generated media coverage and some controversy within Jewish communities. Landau responded to critics by emphasizing principles of Divine sovereignty and the Jewish mission in exile, stating: "We think our voices decide who wins. That's wrong. God does."

=== Media coverage ===
Landau has been profiled in major publications including:

- Mishpacha Magazine (October 2016): "Judgment Day" - A feature on his transition from business to rabbinical leadership
- Ami Magazine (March 2026): "The Growing Influence of Rav Shulem Landau" - An extensive interview exploring his teachings, methods, and philosophy
- The New York Times (April 2026): "A Rabbi Talks Torah on TikTok" - An examination of his social media phenomenon and diverse audience
- Gothamist (October 2025): Coverage of his meeting with Zohran Mamdani
- Jewish Insider (December 2025): "Outspoken Satmar rabbi's Torah videos attract followers from unlikely corners of the internet"

=== Academic and scholarly perspective ===
Professor Nathaniel Deutsch of the University of California, Santa Cruz, told The New York Times: "This is the conjoining of certain deep, centuries-old mystical traditions with the contemporary American moment. He's being read by these non-Jews in this other way."

The Times article noted the phenomenon of "holy envy," a term coined by Swedish bishop Krister Stendahl to describe the attraction to religious wisdom from outside one's own tradition, suggesting this helps explain Landau's cross-cultural appeal.

=== Challenges and concerns ===
The New York Times reported that Landau's comment sections sometimes attract antisemitic remarks or conspiracy theories about Jewish influence. Kalmanowitz explained to the newspaper: "It means, basically, that you created the game, like us Jews rule the world... A lot of our fans are actually big antisemites." Both men agreed that continued posting and engagement was the appropriate response, with Kalmanowitz noting: "Some of them end up turning into big fans of the rabbi."

Landau himself has expressed ambivalence about potential misinterpretations of his message when removed from its Torah context, telling The Times: "The way the world is heading to is, basically, punchlines are taking it over. And from the punchline becomes the next punchline."

== Publications ==
In 2025, Landau published Shalom Nafshi (Peace of My Soul), a sefer (religious book) collecting Torah teachings from six to seven years of his shiurim. The work explores the concept of individual life purpose and attempts to categorize different personality types and their corresponding missions in the world. Drawing on kabbalistic frameworks including the sefiros, the book identifies 36 distinct personality types and explores how each is meant to serve and contribute to the world.
