= Steve Doocy =

American political commentator and TV anchor (born 1956)

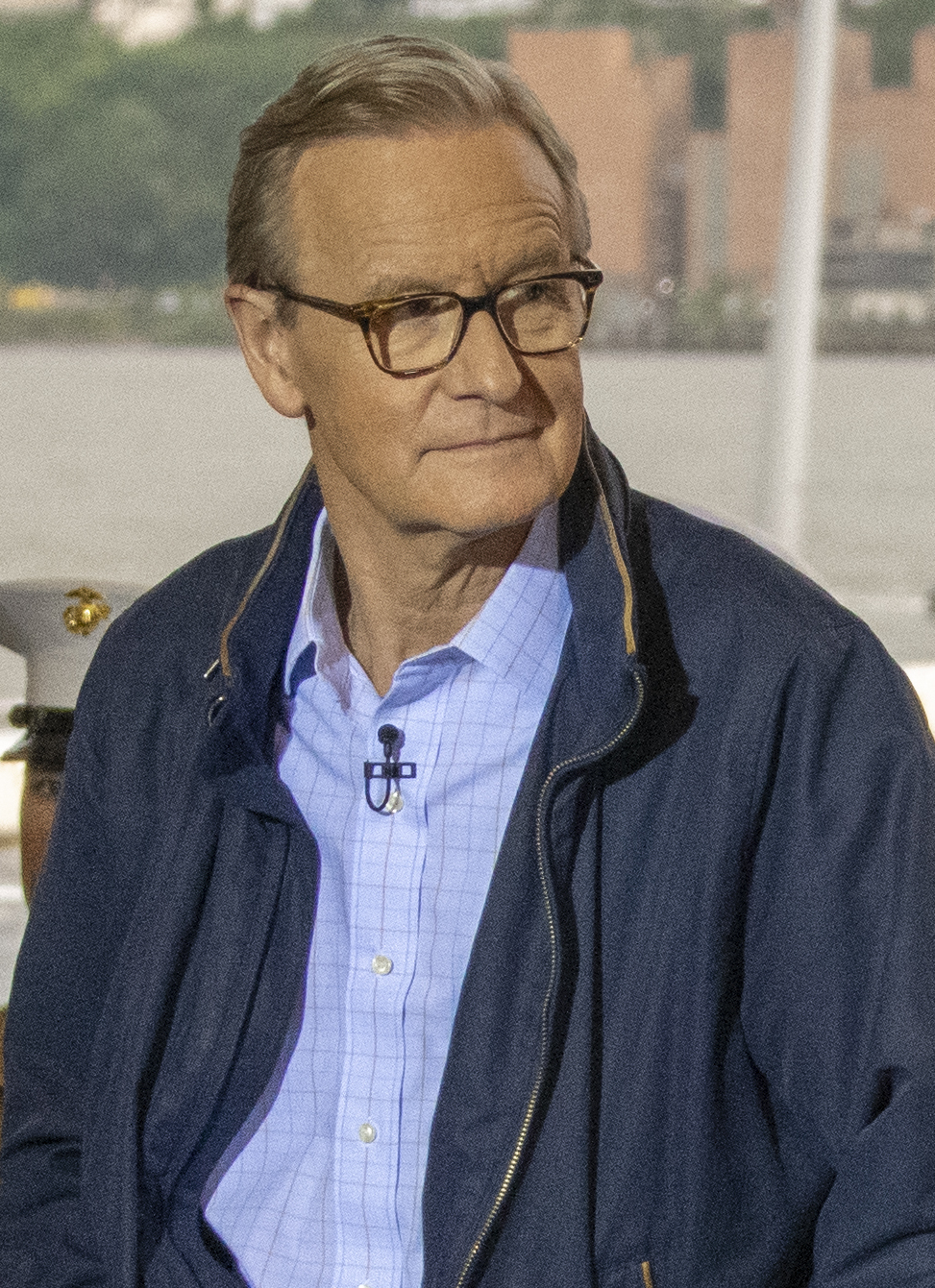
- Doocy in 2019
- Born: Stephen James Doocy; October 19, 1956 (age 69); Algona, Iowa, U.S.
- Education: University of Kansas (BS)
- Occupations: Author, news anchor
- Spouse: Kathy Gerrity
- Children: 3, including Peter

Stephen James Doocy (/ˈduːsi/; born October 19, 1956) is an American television host, political commentator, and author. He currently serves as a traveling co-host of Fox & Friends on the Fox News Channel.

== Early life and education ==
Doocy was born in Algona, Iowa, the first child and only son of James "Jim" Edward Doocy, who worked in sales and construction, and JoAnne Doocy, née Sharp. His paternal grandfather was of Irish descent, and his maternal grandmother of Swedish descent. He was raised in Industry, Kansas, and attended Kansas grade schools in Russell, Salina, and Industry. Doocy went to junior high in Wakefield and high school in Clay Center, Kansas. He graduated from the University of Kansas, in Lawrence, with a Bachelor of Science in journalism. He was the first on-air disc jockey for KJHK radio, the student-operated radio station in Lawrence.

== Career ==
Doocy started his television career with reporter jobs at TV stations in Topeka, Des Moines, Wichita, and Kansas City. His first major market assignment was as a features reporter for WRC, in Washington, D.C. In 1990, Doocy was named the host of NBC's nationally syndicated program House Party with Steve Doocy, a remake of the 1960s Art Linkletter show, which was followed by the syndicated kids' series Not Just News.

In 1994, Doocy got his first morning show job, as the co-host of Wake Up America on NBC's America's Talking channel. He then anchored the morning newscast on CBS-TV's flagship station, WCBS-TV, in 1996 in New York City. He was the live Times Square reporter on Dick Clark's New Year's Rockin' Eve on ABC-TV for four ball drops.

Doocy joined the Fox News Channel in 1996 and began co-hosting the network's morning show Fox & Friends in 1998. In 2004, he helped launch Fox News Channel's New Year's Eve special, All American New Year, whose hosts have included Bill Hemmer and Megyn Kelly.

Fox & Friends regularly interviewed Donald Trump, before and after his election as president. After the election, Trump called it "the most honest morning show." During his first year as president, Trump continued to watch and often quoted the program on Twitter. This prompted The New York Times to call Fox & Friends "the most powerful TV show in America."

In 2019, it was reported that Trump ranked many reporters' loyalty on a scale of 1 to 10. Doocy received a "12 out of 10."

On September 15, 2020, Doocy made news when he challenged President Trump's announcement of a series of weekly appearances on Fox and Friends. Doocy responded: "You may want to do it every week, but Fox is not committed to that. We're going to take it on a case-by-case basis." Doocy extended an invitation for Joe Biden, at the time the Democratic nominee for president, to appear on the program, offering him equal airtime to Trump.

Doocy earned attention in 2022 and 2023 for questioning the Joe Biden-Ukraine Investigation, arguing that there was no evidence to support an impeachment. Because of this Rep. James Comer, Chair of the House Oversight Committee, stopped appearing on the show.

On May 1, 2025, Fox News announced that after serving as a New York City based co-host of Fox & Friends for 27 years, Doocy would start traveling extensively for the morning show.

Doocy has earned TV reporting and writing awards from the Associated Press, the Society of Professional Journalists (formerly known as Sigma Delta Chi), and 11 Emmy Awards from the National Academy of Television Arts and Sciences.

== Published works ==
In 2020, Doocy and his wife Kathy published the Happy in a Hurry Cookbook, which debuted at number one on the New York Times Best Seller list and became one of America's top cookbooks of that pandemic year. It was a sequel to their successful 2018 Happy Cookbook: A Celebration of the Food That Makes America Smile.

The Doocys also authored The Mr. and Mrs. Happy Handbook and Tales from the Dad Side. All four books were published by William Morrow and Company, a division of HarperCollins, and all were New York Times bestsellers.

== Personal life ==
Doocy married Kathy Gerrity, a former model and TV sports reporter who starred in a TV commercial for the Chatty Cathy doll. The couple have three adult children: Mary, Sally and Peter Doocy. Peter serves as a Fox News Senior White House Correspondent, a role he shares with Jacqui Heinrich.

Doocy lives in Florida. Kathy Doocy is a cancer survivor. They have two grandchildren, a granddaughter named Bridget Blake Doocy born on February 1, 2023, and a grandson named George Jack Doocy born on April 16, 2025, the children of Peter Doocy and Hillary Vaughn.

Doocy is Roman Catholic and serves as a lector in his church.

Doocy was named Distinguished Kansan of the Year by the Native Sons and Daughters of Kansas in 2014.
