= Shloime Zionce =

American journalist (born 1993)

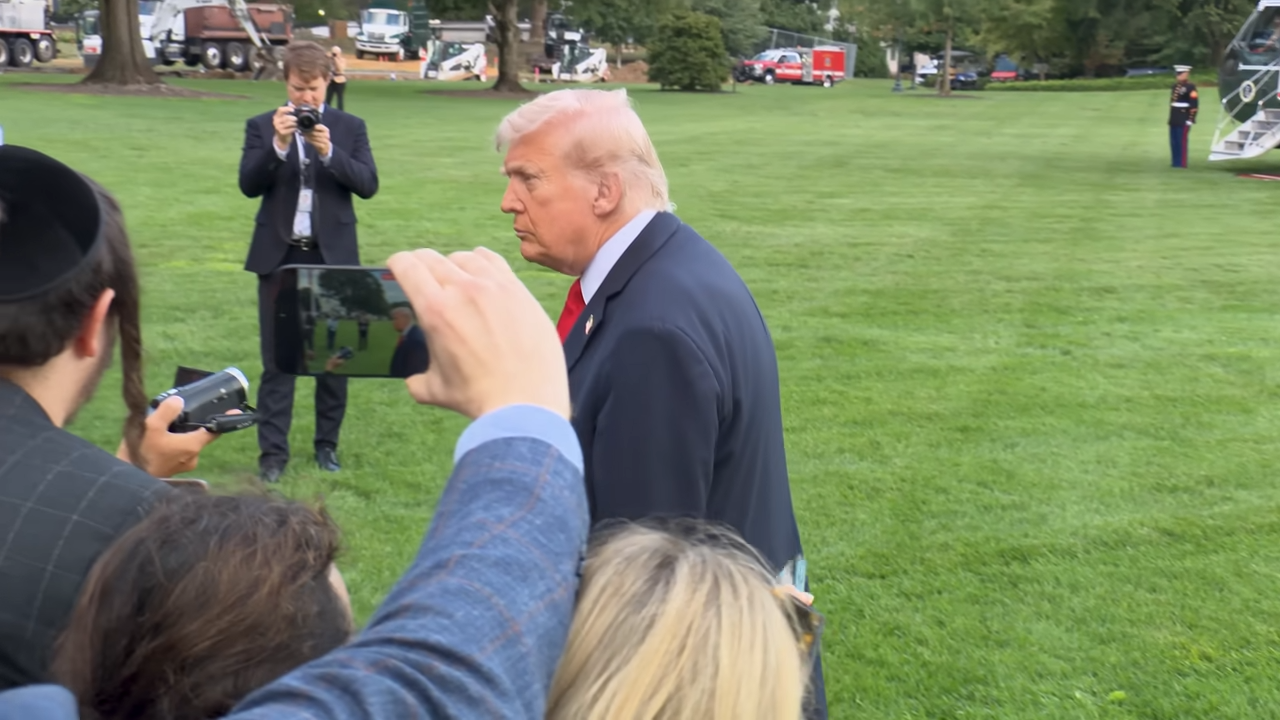
- Zionce (far left) during a press gaggle with President Donald Trump on the White House South Lawn in 2025
- Born: Shlomo Yosef Zionce; November 11, 1993 (age 32); Brooklyn, New York City, U.S.
- Occupation: Journalist
- Employer: Ami Magazine
- Spouse: Mushky Turner (m. 2015)

Shloime Zionce (born November 11, 1993) is an American Hasidic journalist who has served as the Senior White House Correspondent for Ami Magazine since 2025. Previously, he was Ami's foreign correspondent and has traveled to over 50 countries, including Lebanon, Saudi Arabia, Iraq, Afghanistan, and Azerbaijan.

== Early life ==
Zionce was born in Brooklyn, New York, on November 11, 1993, and raised in Toronto, Canada. He attended the Bobover Yeshiva and Shul in Toronto. He began his journalism career as a writer for Ami Magazine, initially focusing on local stories in Israel. His travel writing gained attention after he wrote about a vacation in Thailand, leading to further assignments from the magazine.

== Career ==
Zionce serves as a foreign correspondent for Ami Magazine and is recognized as one of the few Orthodox Jewish traveling journalists. He has a YouTube channel, where his videos have attracted millions of views. His series The Endurance of a Jew features Chabad Shluchim and their global impact, featuring communities in places such as Mumbai, Dubai, Morocco, and Montana.

In collaboration with Peter Santenello, Zionce has created a series of videos aimed at presenting Orthodox Jews positively to a wider audience.

In January 2025, Ami Magazine announced Zionce would be replacing Jake Turx as Senior White House Correspondent.

In 2026, Zionce began a planned two-and-a-half-year project to travel to all 50 U.S. states in a Jewish-themed Tesla Cybertruck, carrying tefillin and Shabbat candles for use in outreach to Jews in rural communities.

== Media appearances ==
Zionce has appeared in various local and international media outlets, including CNN, BBC, and Al-Jazeera. His contributions are noted for bridging cultural divides and representing the Orthodox Jewish community in contemporary society.

== Personal life ==
In 2015, Zionce married Mushky Turner. They have three children.
