= Media Buzz =

American TV news program

- Genre: News media
- Presented by: Howard Kurtz
- Country of origin: United States
- Original language: English
- No. of seasons: 12

Production
- Production location: Washington, D.C.
- Camera setup: Multi-camera
- Running time: 60 minutes

Original release
- Network: Fox News Channel
- Release: September 7, 2013 – September 14, 2025

Media Buzz was an hour-long news media criticism program on Fox News, hosted by Howard Kurtz. The show aired live on Sunday mornings at 11:00 a.m. ET, and discussed that week's current events and how they were portrayed by American media.

The show replaced the similar Fox News Watch, the last edition of which aired on August 31, 2013. Media Buzz aired at the same time as CNN's Reliable Sources with Brian Stelter, which Kurtz had hosted from 1992 until his departure from CNN on June 30, 2013, and was wound down in 2022. Media Buzz surpassed one million viewers in late 2013.

On September 10, 2025, Fox News announced that it was overhauling its weekend lineup, which resulted in MediaBuzz being canceled. The show was replaced with The Sunday Briefing hosted by Peter Doocy and Jacqui Heinrich.

== Frequent panelists ==
The show leads off every week with its signature "Spin Cycle" segment where two or three panelists of diverse backgrounds debate the political issues of the week. Below are frequent panelists of the segment.

- Ben Domenech: Fox News Contributor, editor at large of The Spectator
- Guy Benson: host of The Guy Benson Radio Show
- Leslie Marshall, Fox News contributor, radio host
- Kat Timpf: co-host of Gutfeld!, Fox News analyst
- Will Cain: host of The Will Cain Show
- Mara Liasson: NPR correspondent
- Charles Hurt: The Washington Times columnist, Fox News contributor
- Kevin Corke: Fox News anchor
- Liz Claman: host of The Claman Countdown on Fox Business
- Harold Ford Jr.: co-host of The Five and former Tennessee Congressman (D)
- Laura Fink: Rebelle Communications CEO
- Gianno Caldwell: Fox News political analyst
- Robby Soave: Reason senior editor
- Kevin Walling: Former Joe Biden 2020 and 2024 campaign surrogate
- Mollie Hemingway: senior editor of The Federalist
- Steve Krakauer: Author
- Susan Ferrechio: Political correspondent for The Washington Times
- Jason Chaffetz: Fox News contributor and former Utah congressperson
- Richard Fowler: Fox News contributor, radio host
- Kellyanne Conway: Fox News contributor, former first term Senior Counselor to President Donald Trump

Preceded by Sunday Morning Futures w/ Maria Bartiromo	Media Buzz; 11:00 AM ET – 12:00 PM ET	Succeeded by Fox News Live
