= Kol Mevaser =

Yiddish news hotline broadcast

- Type: news hotline
- Founded: 2005
- Language: Yiddish
- Headquarters: Brooklyn, New York
- Website: https://www.yiddish24.com/

Kol Mevaser (Yiddish: קול מבשר, lit. 'voice of the herald'), also known as Yiddish24, is a Yiddish broadcaster, accessed by telephone, which runs as a news hotline. It has options for playing recorded messages, covering news, weather forecasts and traffic reports, together with scholarly information on several issues which are important to the Yiddish-speaking Haredi Jewish community, and interviews with important figures.

== Programming and content ==
Kol Mevaser was established in 2005 by Zalmen Wieder, the main news presenter on the hotline. Kol Mevaser serves as an alternative to radio broadcasting for the Yiddish-speaking Orthodox Jewish community, which traditionally shuns such media in favor of community-based information sources such as Kol Mevaser, that are presented in Yiddish. It is one of the main sources of information for the global Yiddish-speaking community, with the largest audiences being in the United States, Canada, Israel and the United Kingdom.

The main news programs, which consist of local, world, and Jewish news, are updated twice a day by Wieder, while bulletin news is reported around the clock. Yossi Gestetner provides commentary on political and business news, as well as current events. Other categories are updated less frequently. There is a wide variety of programming on the hotline, including: Interviews conducted by Yitzchok Shloma Dresnser and Hendel Breuer; community affairs with Shaul Klein, Avrohom Yakov Vozner, Pinchas Glauber and Shaya Itzkowitz ("Eliezer Krausz"); psychology with Naftali Stein; and a section devoted to religious Jewish music.

== Yiddish24 ==
In July 2019, Kol Mevaser launched a website and app called "Yiddish24" for iOS and Android users. The website and app offer the same content that is provided by the Kol Mevaser hotline.

== See also ==
- Haredi news hotline
