= Jake Turx =

American journalist and humorist

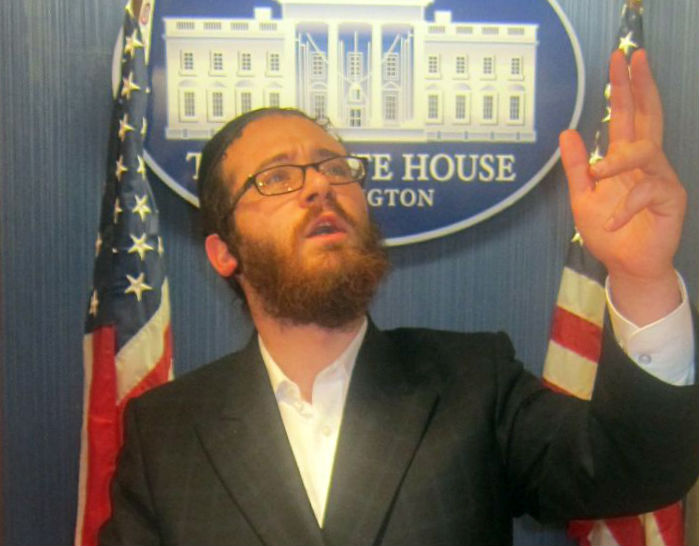
- Turx in 2013
- Born: Avraham Yaakov Tarkieltaub; 1986 or 1987 (age 39–40); New York City, US
- Education: Columbia University Graduate School of Journalism
- Occupation: Journalist
- Known for: Donald Trump press conference incident while serving as Senior White House correspondent and Washington bureau chief for Ami magazine

Avraham Yaakov Tarkieltaub (born 1986/1987) is an American journalist and humorist who writes under the pen name Turx. The senior White House correspondent and chief political correspondent formerly for Ami magazine, and now for Mishpacha, he is currently a political contributor at Newsmax.

The first Hasidic Jew to become a member of the White House press corps, Turx received international media coverage on February 16, 2017, after posing a question regarding antisemitism to President Donald Trump during a press conference.

== Early life and education ==
Abraham Jacob Tarkieltaub, born in Borough Park, Brooklyn, is the eldest of eleven children. As a child, he studied in Yeshiva Bnei Tzion of Bobov. At a young age, Turx and his family moved to Los Angeles, California. There he attended the cheder of an elementary school and Yeshivas Rav Isacsohn. For high school, he attended Hamesivta of Los Angeles, and from there went on to Telshe Yeshiva of Chicago.

Turx studied informally at Columbia University Graduate School of Journalism in New York, under New York Times columnist Professor Ari Goldman.

== Career ==
Turx served as a camp counselor, and then as a head counselor, in Camp Machane Yehuda/Yeshivas Hakayitz. He was a rabbi/teacher in Yeshiva Rav Isacsohn, a teacher in the Lakewood Cheder School from 2008 to 2017, and is the program director at Camp Chevra. He is the CEO of "TurxWurx" Studio.

=== Journalism ===
Turx began writing for Ami magazine in February 2011. As the magazine's political correspondent, he conducted interviews with United States senators, governors, congressional representatives, and presidential candidates. Turx met with, and interviewed, every candidate for president in the 2012 primary season, as well as more than half of the candidates of the 2016 cycle. He wrote a regular satire column for Ami, in addition to political commentary and analysis.

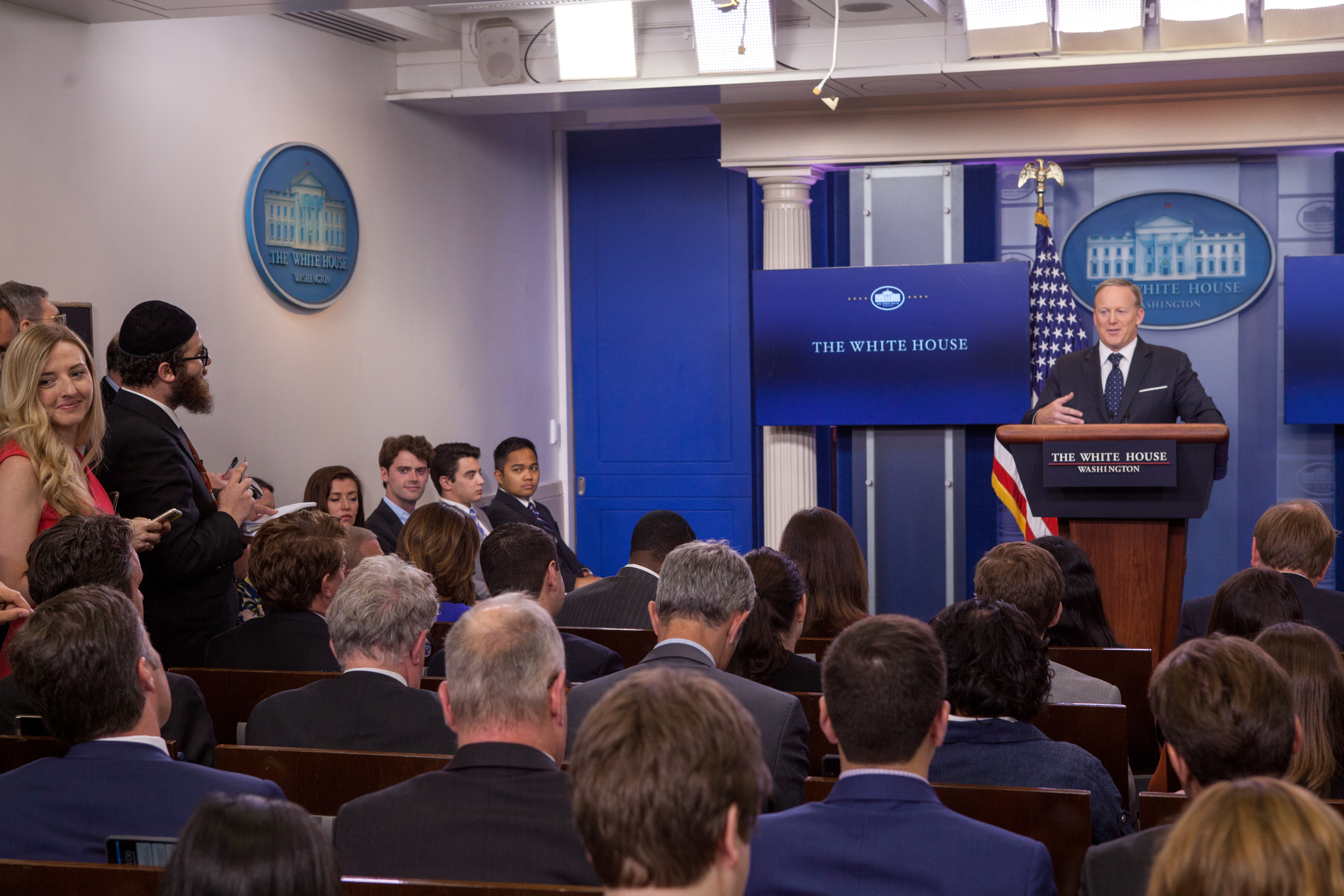
Turx (standing, second from left) at a White House press briefing in 2017

Since the start of the first presidency of Donald Trump in 2017, Turx has been a member of the White House press corps. He initially served as the Senior White House Correspondent and Washington Bureau Chief for Ami. In December 2024, he left Ami and joined Mishpacha magazine as their Chief White House Correspondent. Shloime Zionce succeeded him at Ami.

Turx is on the board of marketing of The Voice of Lakewood, and a regular contributor to Zman, two local magazines. He is also a contributor to Kol Mevaser, a Yiddish language news line. In 2021, Turx was named a political contributor at Newsmax, becoming the first Hasidic person to hold such a high-profile position at a prominent American news outlet.

=== Trump press conference incident ===
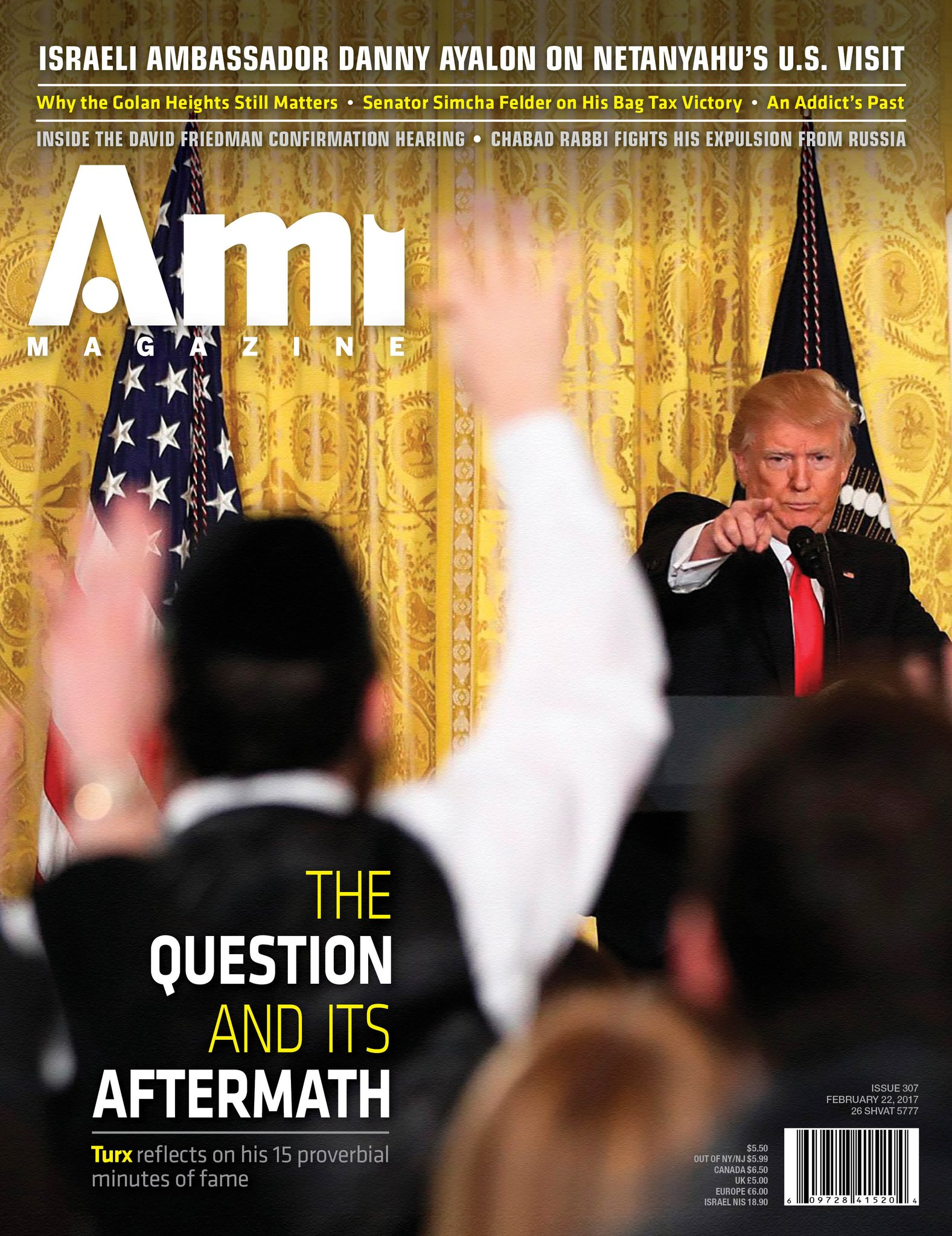
Turx (foreground), featured on the cover of Ami, at President Trump's first press conference

On February 16, 2017, during President Trump's first solo press briefing, Turx began to ask a question regarding the government's response to an uptick in antisemitic threats across the United States. Trump cut Turx off as he was attempting to complete his question, and responded negatively, calling Turx a liar and telling him to sit down. As Trump responded to the question, Turx attempted to interject, prompting Trump to tell him to be silent. Several Jewish organizations, including the Anti-Defamation League and David Harris, the chief executive of the American Jewish Committee, criticized Trump's handling of the incident.

Following the incident, Turx appeared on several nationwide news programs, including Tucker Carlson Tonight and Anderson Cooper 360, where he stated that it was his impression that the president had misunderstood his question and that he continues to believe that the president is not an anti-Semite, nor are any of his senior staff. Turx tweeted, "President Trump clearly misunderstood my question. This is highly regretful and I'm going to seek clarification". He also appeared on Al Jazeera, The Young Turks, CNN Newsroom with Brooke Baldwin, i24news, NPR's "1A" Show, and Sky News.

== Relationship with Azerbaijan ==
Jake Turx has written positively about the Republic of Azerbaijan and the rise of Heydar Aliyev, father of current President Ilham Aliyev. In 2023, in the middle of the blockade of the Republic of Artsakh, Jake Turx was one of the foreign journalists who traveled to Nagorno-Karabakh, and he reported not seeing any blockade, with cars being able to pass unhindered. His statements have subsequently drawn criticism, with allegations that his trip was paid for and arranged by the government of Azerbaijan.

== Personal life ==
Turx, who speaks three languages—English, Yiddish, and Hebrew—resides in Washington, DC during the work week. His family lives in Toms River, New Jersey.

In 2018, for Take Our Daughters and Sons to Work Day, Turx took two of his children to the White House to partake in a "press briefing" organized for the children of the White House correspondents. Donning a MAGA cap, his son asked press secretary Sarah Huckabee Sanders the following question, dubbed "kinda epic" by his father who said it was "his own idea": "After President Trump makes America great again, what job will there be for future presidents?"

== Works ==
- Turx (2017). Stop, Drop, & LOL: How To Safely Roll From Laughter From the Comfort Of Your Own Straitjacket. Menucha Publishers. ISBN 978-1-61465-347-9.
