= Media Madness =

2018 book by Howard Kurtz

Media Madness: Donald Trump, the Press, and the War Over the Truth
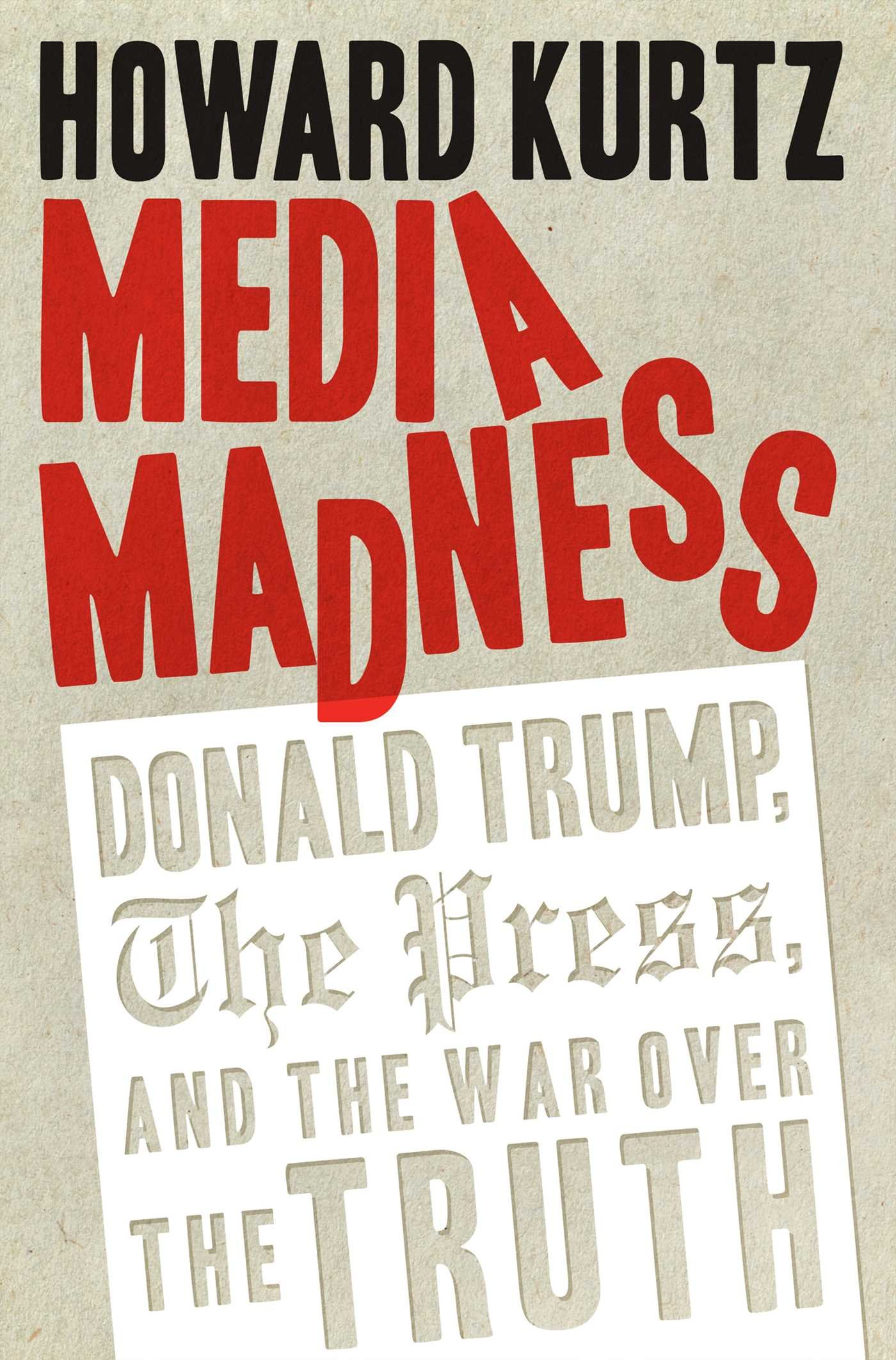
- First edition cover
- Author: Howard Kurtz
- Subject: Presidency of Donald Trump
- Published: January 29, 2018
- Publisher: Regnery Publishing
- Publication place: United States
- Media type: Print, e-book, audiobook
- Pages: 256
- ISBN: 978-1-62157-726-3

Media Madness: Donald Trump, and the War Over the Truth is a book by Howard Kurtz, released on January 29, 2018. It explores the relationship between U.S. President Donald Trump and the mainstream news media during the first year of his first presidency.

== Background ==
Media Madness was published in 2018 and is set during the first term of Trump's presidency of the United States. It explores President Trump's relationship with the mainstream media, examining how their interactions shaped public and political discourse. The book discusses how news organizations address political power. The media environment depicted in the book reflects the widespread controversy surrounding the first Trump administration. Trump and his policies were criticized by mainstream media, with multiple major outlets describing his administration as authoritarian.

In turn, Trump accused news organizations of spreading "fake news", questioning the credibility and objectivity of news organizations' coverage. The book also discusses how he made extensive use of social media, particularly Twitter, during the Trump 2016 election campaign to communicate directly with the public. This mode of communication allowed him to broadcast information bypassing traditional news outlets and public discourse more directly. At the same time, a number of journalists engaged more openly in political debates in response to Trump's accusations, leading some to believe news outlets had become less neutral.

== Themes ==
The most prominent topic in the book is the power dynamic between the news media and the government, referencing the agenda-setting theory. Kurtz explores how Trump broke with the traditional news media channels for disseminating information directly with the public through social media platforms. Another important theme is the discussion of bias and double standards. Kurtz discusses the alleged mainstream liberal media bias in coverage of Trump and criticizes some journalists for bringing their personal biases into their reporting. In addition, the book examines how the Trump administration's attacks on the press have affected how the media has evolved its role in relation to political power. In his analysis of media bias, Kurtz argues that the predominantly negative coverage of Trump by the press has been advantageous to the Trump White House. According to Kurtz, this adversarial approach by the media reinforces Trump's narrative of being unfairly targeted by a biased press.

Kurtz writes about alleged incidences of "internal chaos" within the White House under the first Trump administration. For instance, Kurtz describes instances where staff members allegedly scrambled to manage the president's impulsive behavior and policy decisions influenced by his Twitter activity. Some aides even referred to President Trump's conduct as an example of "Defiance Disorder".

== Reception ==
Media Madness attracted mixed reviews and controversy. Jonathan Chait, writing for Intelligencer, heavily criticized the book, arguing that although Kurtz's allegations of a negative media coverage of Trump may be accurate, they did not indicate bias. He also accused Kurtz of omitting context behind the events reported by the journalists he criticizes. Lloyd Green, writing for The Guardian, praised the book for its "window on the dysfunction that characterizes Trump's White House" but stated that its critique of the media "comes up short". John R. Coyne Jr, writing for The Washington Times, called the book a "strongly written and compelling analysis".

== See also ==
- Media bias in the United States
