= Peter Doocy =

American journalist (born 1987)

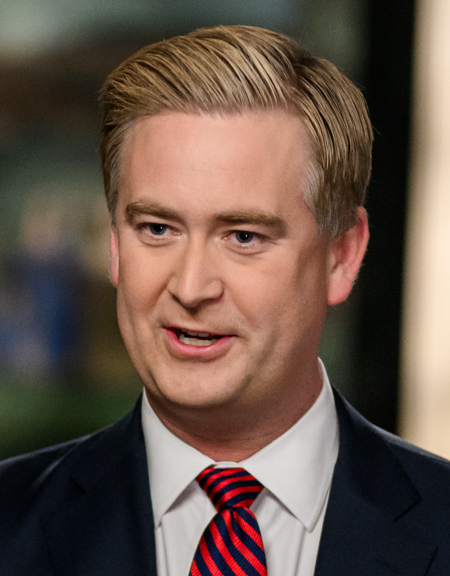
- Doocy in 2025
- Born: Peter James Doocy; July 21, 1987 (age 39); Washington, D.C., U.S.
- Education: Villanova University (BA)
- Spouse: Hillary Vaughn (m. 2021)
- Children: 3
- Relatives: Steve Doocy (father)

Peter James Doocy (born July 21, 1987) is an American senior White House correspondent and co-anchor of The Sunday Briefing for Fox News.

== Early life and education ==
Doocy is the eldest child of Steve Doocy and Kathy (Gerrity) Doocy. His father is a host on the morning show Fox & Friends.

He graduated from Villanova University with a Bachelor of Arts degree in political science in 2009. While in college, he contributed to Fox News as a Palestra.net reporter.

== Career ==
Doocy was hired by Fox News in 2009 after graduating from college; he spent time in New York and Chicago before relocating to Washington, D.C., in 2010.

In 2014, Doocy obtained an exclusive TV interview with former Navy SEAL Robert J. O'Neill, who claims to have fired the shot that killed Osama bin Laden. That special reportedly had the highest ratings of any documentary in Fox News history.

In October 2017, Doocy asked Senator John McCain (R-AZ) whether his relationship with President Trump had frayed to the point McCain would reject anything Trump might ask him to support. McCain replied that the question was "stupid", and reiterated that his role as a US senator was to represent his constituents, not to let personal disagreements interfere with that purpose.

He was a campaign reporter in the 2018 midterm elections.

Doocy reported on the 2020 Democratic Party presidential primaries and the presidential campaign of the party's nominee, Joe Biden. In January 2021, Fox News named Doocy as a White House correspondent to cover the incoming Biden administration. He quickly established a reputation for clashing with the president and White House Press Secretary Jen Psaki. Several Doocy–Psaki exchanges became Internet memes.

After covering a White House East Room meeting focused on economic competitiveness and inflation, a departing Doocy called out to Biden: "Do you think inflation is a political liability in the midterms?" Lowering his voice, and turning slightly away from the hot mic beneath him; as ABC reported, "Biden responded with sarcasm, 'It's a great asset — more inflation.' Then he shook his head and added, 'What a stupid son of a bitch.'" Some sources have speculated about whether or not Biden intended to have his comments picked up by the microphone. Biden called Doocy within an hour to clear the air. According to Doocy, Biden said, "It's nothing personal, pal."

In February 2024, Doocy asked President Biden, "How bad is your memory? Can you continue as president?" Biden replied, "My memory is so bad that I let you speak." This was after a report describing Biden's memory as "poor" was released.

On June 17, 2024, Fox News announced it had promoted Doocy to the role of senior White House correspondent.

In September 2025, it was announced that Doocy would helm a new show called The Sunday Briefing as an alternating co-host alongside fellow White House Correspondent Jacqui Heinrich beginning on September 21, 2025.

== Personal life ==
In April 2021, Doocy married Hillary Vaughn, a Fox Business correspondent. They have two children.

Peter is first cousins with Mike Doocy, a sports anchor at Fox 4 in Dallas/Fort Worth, often referred to as “The Forth Muser”.
