= Haredi news hotline =

Type of media

A Haredi news hotline is a telephone service that serves as an important source of news in the Haredi world. Many Haredim do not use radios or televisions or have access to the internet, leaving them with little or no access to breaking news. News hotlines were formed to fill this gap, and many have expanded to additional fields over time. Currently, many news lines provide rabbinic lectures, entertainment, business advice and similar services, in addition to their primary function of reporting the news. Many hasidic sects maintain their own hotlines, where relevant internal news is reported and the group's perspective can be advocated for. In the Israeli Haredi community, there are dozens of prominent hotlines, in both Yiddish and Hebrew. Some Haredi hotlines have played significant public roles, however many prominent services have faced struggles.

== Kol Mevaser ==
Kol Mevaser is a Yiddish news hotline. It reports the news, weather, lottery, traffic, and carries interviews and scholarly lectures on various topics of interest to the Yiddish-speaking Orthodox Jewish community.

== Frum News Wire ==
Frum News Wire, or FNW, was a news hotline based in Lakewood Township, New Jersey, a subsidiary of the Voice of Lakewood magazine. FNW carried local and world news, audio recordings of notable events, and various forms of entertainment. They have had interviews with notable Haredi personalities, such as Jake Turx, Yossi Gestetner, and Richard Roberts.. One of its popular shows was The Yaakov M. Show, a political podcast.

According to FNW, most callers called more than once a day, and the hotline had an average total of fifteen thousand calls a day. It said that the majority of its listeners were from the tri-state area, with approximately half from Lakewood.

During its final months, FNW stopped updating their news and music sections, only updating The Yaakov M. Show. After they shut down, The Yaakov M. Show opened up its own hotline, the Jewish News Channel, before moving to Yeshiva International.

== Yeshiva International Newsline ==
Yeshiva International Newsline, often referred to as YIN, is a Haredi news hotline, based in Lakewood Township, New Jersey.

=== History ===
YIN was started in 2012 on a restricted access network which required a password, and was advertised by word of mouth. Often broadcasting news that was unavailable in the mainstream English language Haredi media, it successfully carved out a niche for itself within the Haredi yeshiva community. In its early period, the hotline issued extensive coverage of the plans and efforts underway in Israel to initiate a compulsory draft of Haredi yeshiva students. The hotline espoused a Satmar-like position on the matter, and strongly praised Rabbi Shmuel Auerbach and his no-compromise policy regarding the draft law.

=== Current format ===
YIN eventually switched to an open access system and started carrying advertisements. As the hotline grew more popular, YIN gradually shifted from its intense focus on Israeli Haredi news to more general coverage, although it continues to report Israeli news. Together with news reports, the hotline features a music section, rabbinic lectures, documentaries (deemed appropriate for the hareidi audience), and various seasonal sections, usually before major Jewish holidays.

== Voicenews ==
Voicenews, a Haredi news hotline, advertises on their Twitter account with the slogan: "No Smartphone. Listen to updated news by dialing...." Voicenews, operating entirely with an automated voice, includes news, read from articles by larger news companies, including Associated Press, Washington Examiner, Israel National News, and Hamodia; a music section; audio recordings of notable speeches by politicians and other governmental figures; the weather and zmanim; and deals.

== See also ==
- Hamodia
- Yated Ne'eman (United States)
