= Benyamin Cohen =

American journalist and author

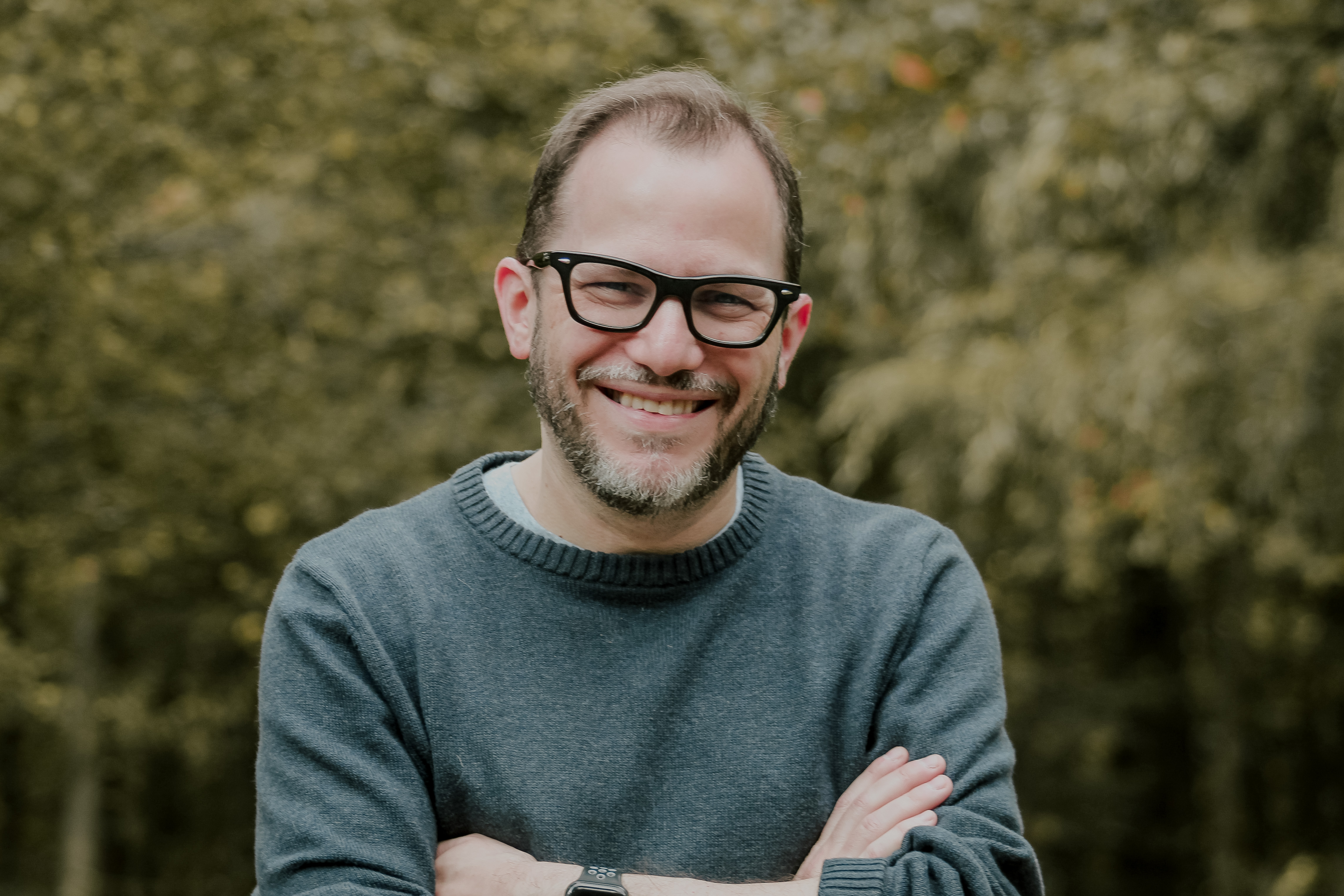
Benyamin Cohen

Benyamin Cohen (born 1975) is an American journalist, editor and memoirist, currently the News Director of the Jewish publication The Forward.

Cohen was the founder and editor of both the award-winning national magazine American Jewish Life and the online magazine Jewsweek. He has written for the Huffington Post, the Daily Beast, the Washington Post, and Slate. Before that, he edited Torah from Dixie, thoughts on the weekly Bible portion, which was later turned into a book by the same name. He served as the content director for the Mother Nature Network, a science and environmental news website.

In 2014, he became the editorial director of the website "From The Grapevine". In 2018, he began hosting a weekly interview podcast, hosted on the Grapevine site, called "Our Friend from Israel". He previously served as the host of the "Hadassah on Call" podcast. In December 2020, it was announced that he became the News Director of The Forward.

== Jewsweek ==
Jewsweek was an online magazine devoted to covering issues pertinent to young Jews in their 20s and 30s. It was created by Cohen in 2001. It covered a host of subjects, including topical events in the entertainment industry, political world, and within Judaism itself, both as it concerned the United States and Israel. In 2005 Cohen sold the company, which was subsequently reopened under Blue Star Media. Jewsweek ceased operation in 2007.

== Books ==
=== My Jesus Year ===
Cohen's book My Jesus Year: A Rabbi’s Son Wanders the Bible Belt in Search of Faith was published by HarperOne in 2008. The book is part memoir, part spiritual quest, and part anthropologist's mission. Publishers Weekly named it one of the best books of the year, for which Cohen received the Georgia Author of the Year Award.

In the book, Cohen seeks to understand his personal lack of enthusiasm for Orthodox Judaism, as well as why it is that Christians in the US Bible Belt are so excited about Christianity. Among many adventures, he jumps into the mosh-pit at a Christian rock concert, sees himself on the JumboTron of a Black Baptist service, goes door-to-door with Mormon missionaries, attends a Christian wrestling event, and spends the day with some monks at a monastery. To Cohen's surprise, his search for universal answers and truths in the Bible Belt actually makes him a better Jew.

=== The Einstein Effect ===
Cohen's next book, about the famed scientist Albert Einstein, was The Einstein Effect: How the World's Favorite Genius Got into Our Cars, Our Bathrooms, and Our Minds, published in 2023. The book discusses how Einstein's work can be found in modern technologies like GPS and iPhone cameras, and includes interviews with celebrities who have been inspired by Einstein – including Christopher Lloyd and Yahoo Serious. A chapter devoted to Einstein's work helping refugees includes a conversation with actor Mandy Patinkin, who is the ambassador for the International Rescue Committee, a refugee aid organization founded by Einstein.

In addition to writing the book, Cohen runs the official social media accounts for Albert Einstein, which have more than 20 million followers.

== Bibliography ==
- Torah from Dixie: Intriguing Thoughts on the Weekly Torah Portion (1998)
- My Jesus Year: A Rabbi’s Son Wanders the Bible Belt in Search of His Own Faith (HarperOne, 2008).
- The Einstein Effect: How the World's Favorite Genius Got into Our Cars, Our Bathrooms, and Our Minds (Sourcebooks, 2023)
