= Ami Magazine =

Orthodox Jewish magazine

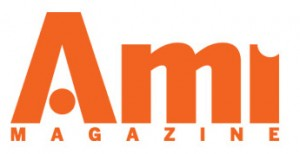

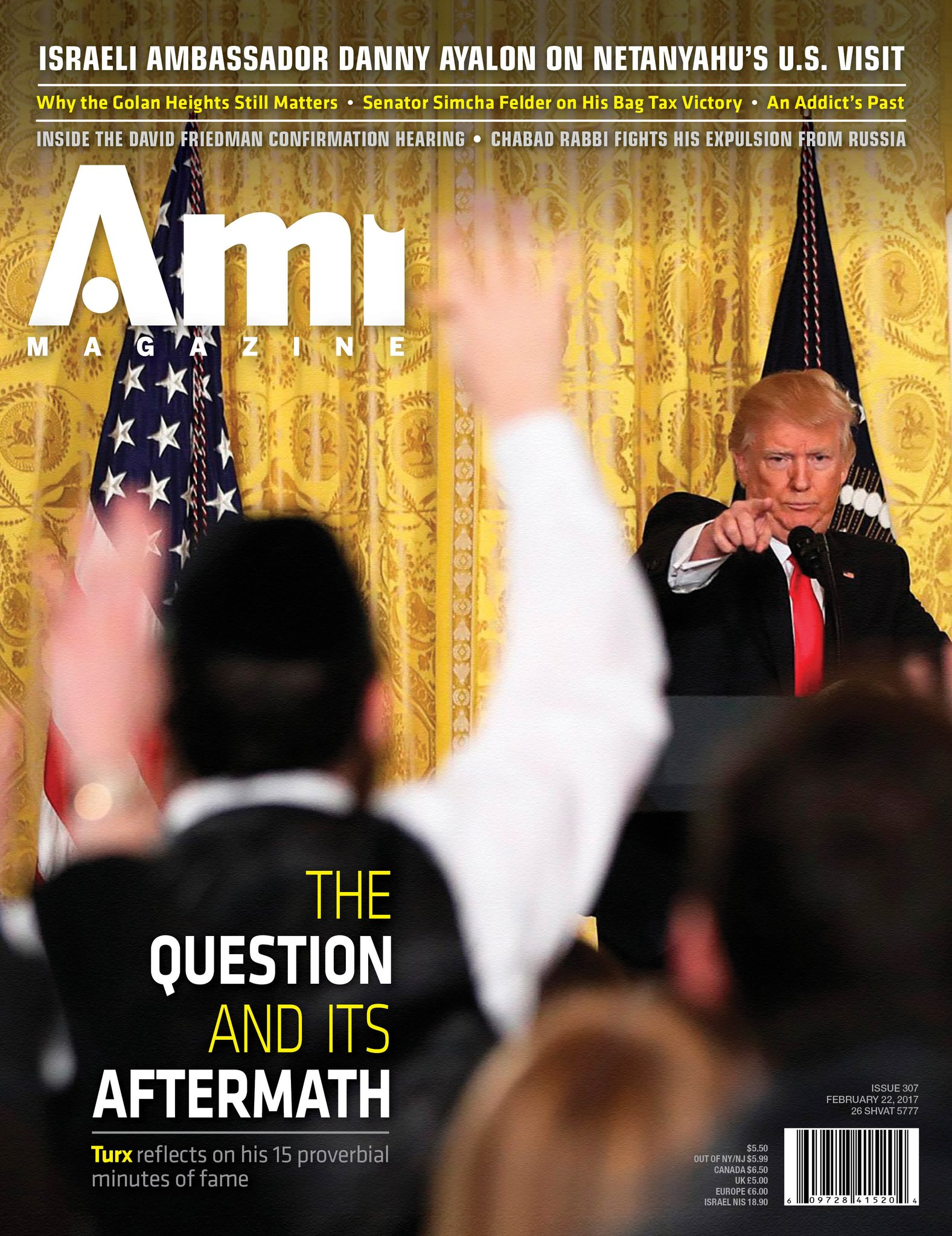
- Cover of the February 22, 2017, issue
- Frequency: weekly
- Publisher: Rabbi Yitzchok Frankfurter
- First issue: November 2010
- Company: Ami Magazine
- Country: United States
- Based in: Brooklyn, New York
- Language: English
- Website: https://www.amimagazine.org/
- ISSN: 2638-9894
- OCLC: 941069076

Ami Magazine (Hebrew: עמי, lit. 'My people') is an international news magazine that caters to the Orthodox Jewish community. It is published weekly in New York City and Israel. The magazine was launched in November 2010 by Rabbi Yitzchok Frankfurter (previously Torah Editor for Mishpacha) and his wife, Rechy Frankfurter (previously Mishpacha's American Desk Editor).

== Coverage ==
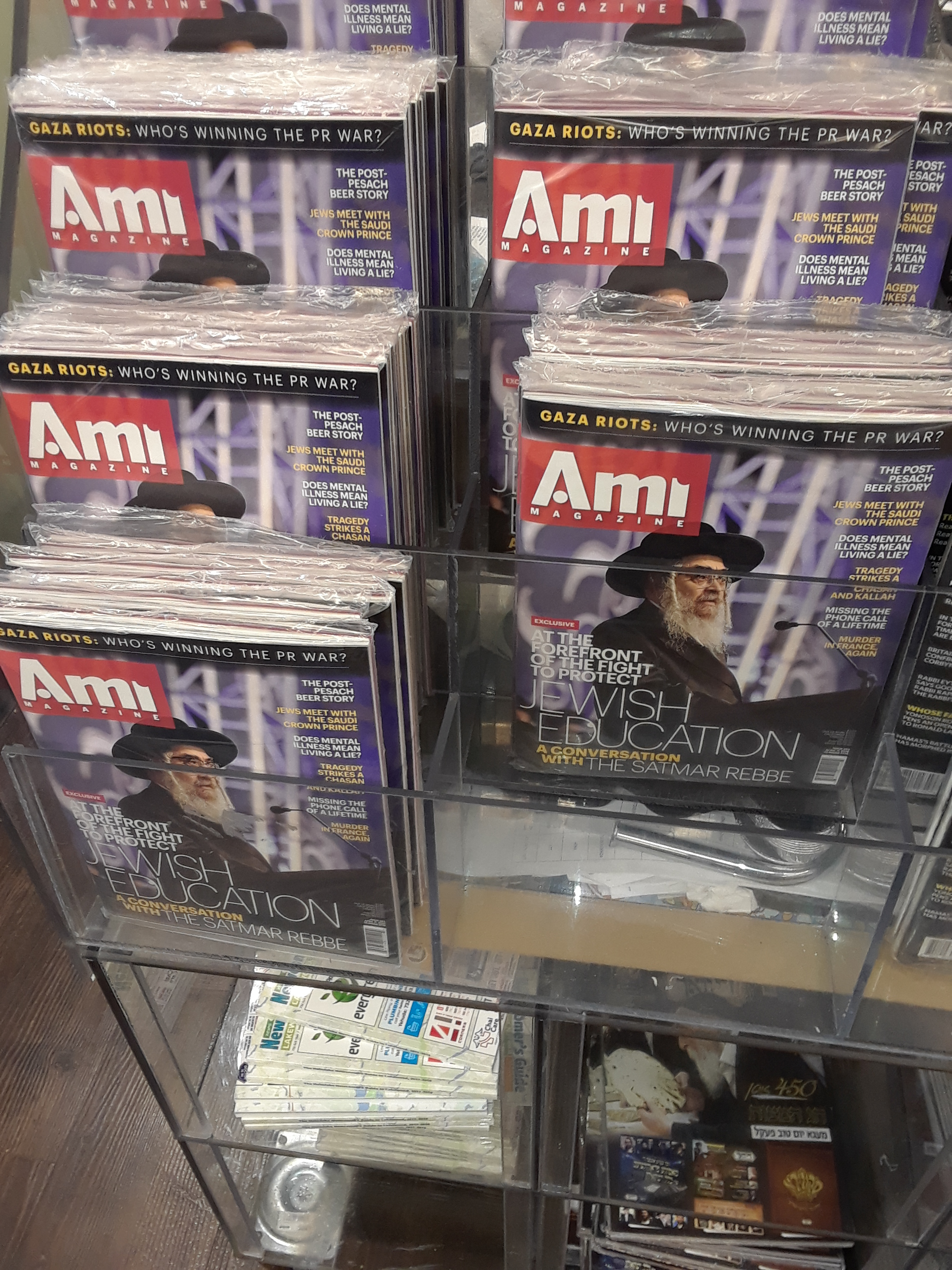
Ami Magazines for sale in Lakewood, New Jersey

Ami has featured interviews with politicians, including President Donald Trump, Senator Ted Cruz, Senator Marco Rubio, Newt Gingrich, Ron Paul, George Pataki, Ben Carson, former White House Press secretaries Sean Spicer and Ari Fleischer, and former White House counsel John Dean. Ami has also interviewed rabbis including Yissachar Dov Rokeach, Yisrael Horowitz of Kaliv, Dovid Soloveitchik, Baruch Mordechai Ezrachi, Nissan Kaplan, Manis Friedman, Reuven Feinstein, and Nosson Scherman.

Ami's former political correspondent Jake Turx became the magazine's first member of the White House press corps, with the start of the first Donald Trump administration. During a February 16, 2017, press briefing, Turx began asking a question about the government's response to antisemitic threats across the United States, but was stopped in mid-question by Trump, who felt he was being personally attacked and denied being antisemitic. Merriam-Webster reported that searches for "anti-Semitism" spiked in the week following the Trump-Turx exchange.

In January 2025, Shloime Zionce became the magazine's White House correspondent, replacing Turx.

Ami also produces a women's magazine, called Ami Living, and a tween magazine, called Aim!.

Ami journalists and writers have traveled to several continents and numerous countries, spanning North Korea, Saudi Arabia, Malta, Cuba, Iraq, the Nevada desert surrounding Area 51, Chernobyl, Afghanistan, a possible location of Mount Sinai, the burial place of Aharon HaKohen in Jordan, Murphy Ranch in California, and more.

On December 11, 2019, shortly before the first impeachment trial of Donald Trump, Ami published a poll it had taken among 723 Orthodox Jews, asking five questions, four of them pertaining to the presidency of Donald Trump, with an overwhelming majority expressing support for President Trump. The poll gained much fame after Trump tweeted it.

== Controversies ==
Some rabbis in the Williamsburg neighborhood of Brooklyn asked that Ami (along with the Jewish publications of Mishpacha and Hamodia) not be read, after the magazine published a piece about Jewish religious terrorism perpetrated by Sikrikim and sympathizers of the Jerusalem-based Edah HaChareidis organization. The Satmar Rebbe of Kiryas Joel, Rabbi Aaron Teitelbaum, along with various other Jewish leaders, has since that time condemned some of the communities which make up the Edah HaChareidis for alleged extremism.

In 2014, Ami Magazine featured a positive profile of the Jewish cult Lev Tahor.
