= Howard Kurtz =

American journalist and author (born 1953)

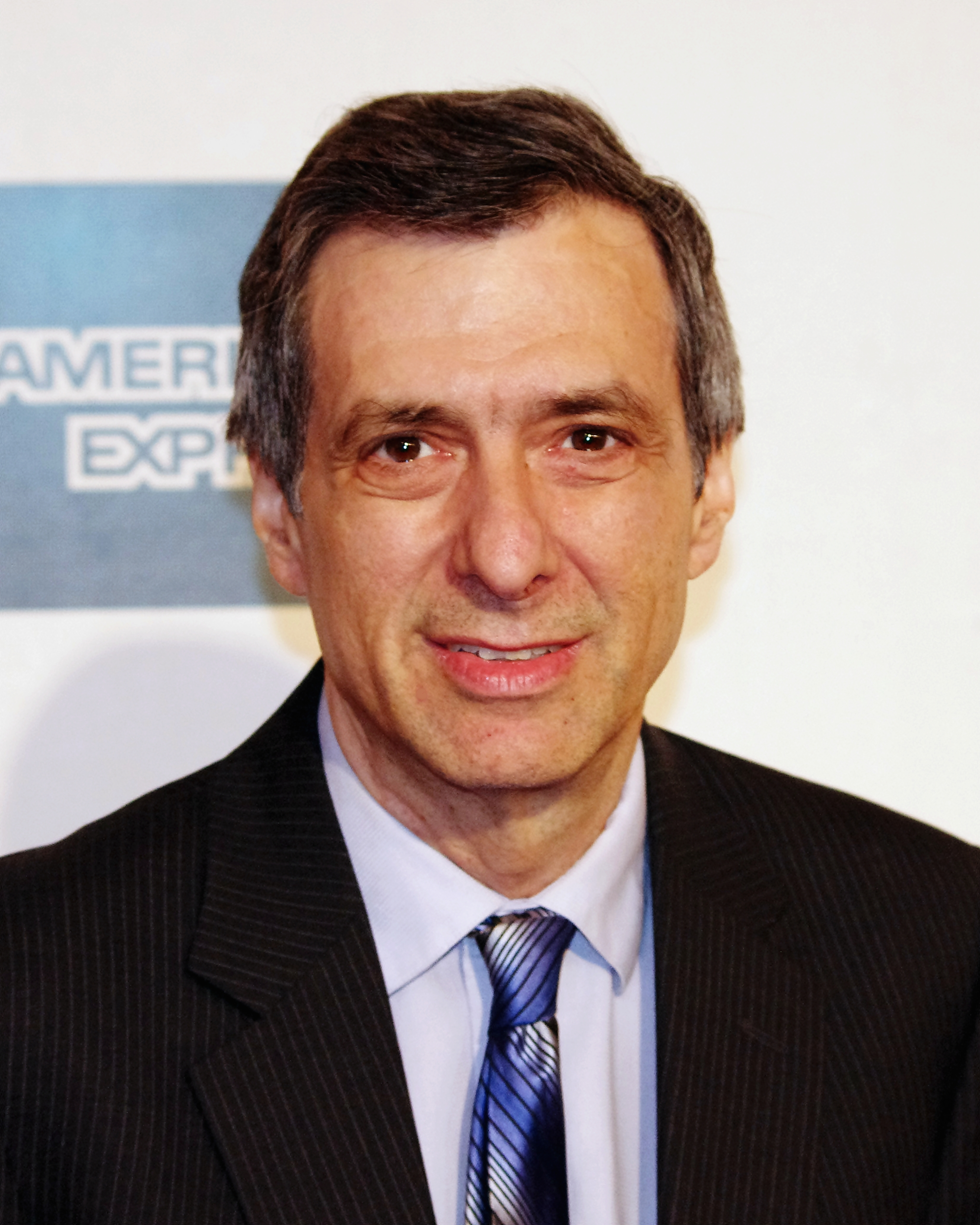
- Kurtz in 2012
- Born: Howard Alan Kurtz; August 1, 1953 (age 73); New York City, U.S.
- Education: University at Buffalo (BA); Columbia University (MA)
- Occupations: Journalist, author
- Spouse(s): Current Spouse: Lauren Ashburn (2020-Present) Mary Tallmer (1979–?; 2 children); Sheri Annis (2003–2018; 1 child)

Howard Alan Kurtz (/kɜːrts/; born August 1, 1953) is an American journalist and author and former host of Media Buzz on Fox News. He is also the former media writer for The Washington Post and the former Washington bureau chief for The Daily Beast. He has written five books about the media. Kurtz left CNN and joined Fox News in 2013.

== Early life and education ==
Kurtz was born on August 1, 1953, to a Jewish family, in the Sheepshead Bay neighborhood of Brooklyn, New York, the son of Marcia, a homemaker, and Leonard Kurtz, a clothing executive. He is a 1970 graduate of Sheepshead Bay High School, and also of the University at Buffalo (State University of New York). In college, he worked on a student newspaper, the Spectrum, becoming the editor his senior year. Kurtz earned a B. A. in psychology and English in 1974. He then attended the Columbia University Graduate School of Journalism.

== Career ==
After college, Kurtz went to work for the Record in New Jersey. He moved to Washington, D.C., to work as a reporter for syndicated columnist Jack Anderson. Kurtz left Anderson to join The Washington Star, an afternoon paper. When the newspaper closed in 1981, Kurtz was hired at The Washington Post by Bob Woodward, then the Metro editor. Kurtz has also written for The New Republic, The Washington Monthly, and New York magazine.

=== The Washington Post ===
Kurtz joined the staff of The Washington Post in 1981 and left in 2010 (29 years). He served there as a national affairs correspondent, New York bureau chief and deputy national editor. Kurtz covered the news media between 1990 and 2010 for The Washington Post.

=== Reliable Sources on CNN ===
From 1998 until 2013, Kurtz served as host of the weekly CNN program Reliable Sources, a cable television program that explores the standards, performance and biases of the media. Kurtz led the scrutinizing of the media's fairness and objectivity by questioning journalists of top news organizations, including those at CNN. The show premiered in 1992 when it originated as a one-hour special to discuss the media's coverage of the Persian Gulf War.

Kurtz's 2008 Reliable Sources interview of Kimberly Dozier, a CBS reporter wounded in Iraq, was criticized by several members of the media because Kurtz's wife had been paid as a publicist for Dozier's memoir. During the interview, Kurtz praised Dozier and read passages of her book. Kurtz had explained his wife's relationship to Dozier during the program, saying "I should mention that my wife has done some promotion work for Kim Dozier’s book.” Responding to the controversy, CNN stated “Kurtz discussed the interview in advance with the show’s senior producer, and they agreed to disclose his wife’s working relationship with Ms. Dozier, which is exactly what he did.”

=== The Daily Beast ===
In October 2010, Kurtz announced he was moving to the online publication The Daily Beast. He served as the Washington bureau chief for the website, writing on media and politics until 2013. His salary at The Daily Beast was reported to be $600,000 a year. On May 2, 2013, the site's editor-in-chief Tina Brown announced that Kurtz and The Daily Beast had "parted company". It occurred in the aftermath of a controversy in which Kurtz incorrectly accused NBA player Jason Collins of failing to acknowledge a former heterosexual engagement when he came out as a homosexual; Kurtz stated the parting was mutual and "in the works for some time". Sources inside the Daily Beast newsroom have stated that Kurtz's departure became inevitable once he began writing for and promoting a lesser-known media website called Daily Download. Kurtz was previously the subject of controversy when Nancy Pelosi denied making a statement Kurtz attributed to her, and a quote Kurtz attributed to Darrell Issa was reported to have actually been made by his spokesperson. Brown later said on Twitter she fired Kurtz for "serial inaccuracy", contradicting her original story that Kurtz had amicably parted ways with the Daily Beast.

=== Fox News ===
On June 20, 2013, Kurtz left CNN to join Fox News Channel to host a weekend media program and write a column for FoxNews.com. Kurtz's Media Buzz replaced the Fox News Watch program hosted by Jon Scott. Fox News has been supportive of Donald Trump's presidential campaigns. In an October 2024 interview conducted by Kurtz, Trump "was challenged directly on some of his most glaring falsehoods of the campaign." His TV show MediaBuzz was cancelled in September 2025 after 12 years on the air; the podcast format of the show is expected to continue for at least two more years.

== Books ==
External videos
- Booknotes interview with Kurtz on Media Circus, June 20, 1993, C-SPAN
- Washington Journal interview with Kurtz on Spin Cycle, March 16, 1998, C-SPAN
- Presentation by Kurtz on The Fortune Tellers, September 6, 2000, C-SPAN
- After Words interview with Kurtz on Reality Show, December 22, 2007, C-SPAN
- Washington Journal interview with Kurtz on Media Madness, February 20, 2018, C-SPAN

Media Circus: The Trouble with America's Newspapers (1993, ISBN 0-8129-2022-8) identifies problems afflicting U.S. newspapers and offers suggestions. Among the issues identified are timid leadership, a spreading tabloid approach to news with a growing focus on celebrities and personal scandal, poor coverage of racial issues and the Persian Gulf war, increasing bureaucracy and a pasteurization of the news.

Hot Air: All Talk, All the Time (1997, ISBN 0-8129-2624-2) describes failings of the talk-show and political talk-show format even as it had been rapidly proliferating on television and radio. Some problems he identifies include superficiality, lies, hysteria, lack of preparation, sensationalism and conflicts of interest.

Spin Cycle: Inside the Clinton Propaganda Machine (1998, ISBN 0-684-85231-4) describes various techniques used by the Clinton White House to put spin on the controversies and scandals surrounding the Clintons and to refocus the attention of the media on topics other than non-issues focused on by the media.

The Fortune Tellers: Inside Wall Street's Game of Money, Media, and Manipulation (2000, ISBN 0-684-86879-2) addresses the growing public fascination with stock market trading as fueled by cable television shows and internet sites providing platforms to pundits, stock touts and brokerage firm stock analysts. The potential for manipulation of the media and the public by stock market insiders is discussed.

Reality Show: Inside the Last Great Television News War (2007, ISBN 0-7432-9982-5) chronicles the struggles at TV networks ABC, NBC and CBS to enhance the stature, credibility and audience draw of their anchors of the evening network news programs. The book's focus is on ABC's Charles Gibson, CBS's Katie Couric and NBC's Brian Williams.

Media Madness: Donald Trump, The Press, And The War Over The Truth, which was released in January 2018, discussed Donald Trump's fights with the news media during the first year of his presidency. The book argues that the media unfairly treated President Trump. According to a review by Jonathan Chait in New York magazine, "To Kurtz ... the 'massive imbalance' between Trump's coverage and coverage of other presidents can only be explained by media bias. He treats this premise as definitionally true—not defending it outright, but simply building his case as though no other explanation could even theoretically exist. And so the strange mission of his book is to analyze the hostile relationship between Trump and the mainstream news media without in any way acknowledging any background as to why."

== Personal life ==
Kurtz married media consultant Sheri Annis in May 2003. Kurtz married journalist Lauren Ashburn in 2020.

Kurtz has publicly declined to state his political affiliation. As a high-profile media critic and analyst, Kurtz's political leanings and multiple employers and possible biases have been discussed by fellow media critics and pundits. Both liberal and conservative viewpoints have been observed in his writing.
