= Jacqui Heinrich =

American news correspondent and anchor (born 1988)

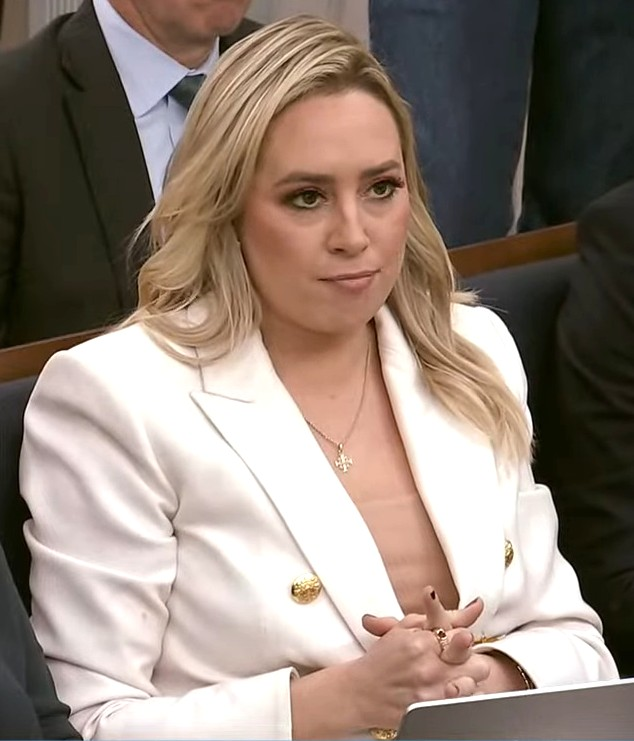
- Heinrich in 2024
- Born: Jacqueline Heinrich; November 21, 1988 (age 37); Boston, Massachusetts, U.S.
- Education: Duke University; George Washington University
- Occupations: News anchor; reporter; journalist
- Employer: Fox News
- Spouse: Brian Fitzpatrick (m. 2026)

Jacqueline "Jacqui" Heinrich is an American television journalist who serves as the Senior White House Correspondent for Fox News Channel and co-host of The Sunday Briefing, the network's Sunday morning political affairs program. She has covered the White House since 2021, reporting on the administrations of Presidents Joe Biden and Donald Trump. Heinrich serves as president of the White House Correspondents' Association, having been elected by members of the White House press corps to consecutive three-year terms on the association's executive board in 2022 and 2025. She is a three-time Emmy Award-winning journalist.

== Career ==
In June 2024, Heinrich was promoted to Senior White House Correspondent for Fox News Channel after serving as White House correspondent since 2021. She covers the White House, domestic and foreign policy, national security, and presidential campaigns, reporting on both the Biden and second Trump administrations.

In September 2025, Heinrich became co-host of The Sunday Briefing, Fox News Channel's Sunday morning public affairs program, alongside fellow Senior White House Correspondent Peter Doocy.

As White House correspondent, Heinrich has interviewed numerous world leaders, including Presidents Donald Trump and Volodymyr Zelenskyy, Finnish President Alexander Stubb, and Israeli Prime Minister Benjamin Netanyahu.

Heinrich joined Fox News Channel in September 2018 as a New York-based general assignment reporter. She covered the 2020 United States presidential election, including reporting from both the Democratic and Republican National Conventions. In February 2021, she was promoted to congressional correspondent covering Capitol Hill before joining the White House beat later that year.

Before joining Fox News, Heinrich worked as an anchor and reporter for WFXT (Boston 25 News) in Boston from 2016 to 2018. She covered major breaking news stories including the 2017 Las Vegas shooting and the South End trench collapse in Boston. In 2017, she was named General Assignment Reporter of the Year by the National Academy of Television Arts & Sciences Boston/New England Chapter.

Previously, Heinrich was a reporter and weekend evening anchor at KTNV-TV in Las Vegas, where she received a Regional Emmy Award for reporting on sex trafficking. She also covered the Eric Nowsch murder trial, later appearing as a local media analyst on two episodes of ABC's 20/20.

Heinrich began her television career at KOAA-TV in Colorado Springs as a multimedia journalist. She later became the station's weekend morning anchor and received a Regional Emmy Award for investigative reporting on methamphetamine laboratory cleanup loopholes.

== White House Correspondents' Association ==
In 2022, Heinrich was elected by members of the White House press corps to represent television correspondents on the executive board of the White House Correspondents' Association (WHCA). She was re-elected in 2025 to a second consecutive three-year term.

Heinrich serves as president of the association for the 2026–2027 term. The WHCA, founded in 1914, represents journalists covering the White House and advocates for press freedom, access to the presidency, and First Amendment protections.

== Speaking engagements ==
Heinrich has moderated discussions at several foreign policy and national security conferences. In October 2023, she moderated the panel Beyond Ukraine: Building a Grand Strategy for the Western World at the Richard Nixon Foundation's Grand Strategy Summit, featuring Jane Harman, Mike Waltz, and former National Security Agency Director Michael S. Rogers.

In March 2026, Heinrich moderated a featured conversation with former U.S. Ambassador to Japan Rahm Emanuel at the American Enterprise Institute's annual World Forum in Sea Island, Georgia.

In July 2026, Heinrich moderated the Aspen Security Forum panel Israel Today, featuring Ted Deutch, Dahlia Scheindlin, and former U.S. Ambassador to Israel Daniel Shapiro.

== Awards and honors ==
Heinrich has received three Emmy Awards for her reporting. While at KTNV-TV in Las Vegas, she received a Regional Emmy Award for reporting on sex trafficking.

While at KOAA-TV in Colorado Springs, she received a Regional Emmy Award for investigative reporting examining regulatory loopholes in the cleanup of former methamphetamine laboratories.

In 2017, Heinrich was named **General Assignment Reporter of the Year** by the Boston/New England chapter of the National Academy of Television Arts & Sciences while at WFXT in Boston.

== Personal life ==
Heinrich is from New England. She attended Duke University in 2006 before transferring to George Washington University, where she studied international affairs. She resides in Washington, D.C..

On June 20, 2026 at Saint Patrick's Cathedral in New York City, Heinrich married U.S. Representative Brian Fitzpatrick, a Republican.. Their wedding followed a 2025 engagement in Provence, France.
