= Tully Center for Free Speech =

Free Speech Institute at Syracuse University

- Named after: Joan A. Tully
- Established: 2006; 20 years ago
- Type: Private research institution
- Headquarters: Newhouse School of Public Communications
- Location: Syracuse, New York
- Fields: Journalism; free speech
- Director: Roy Gutterman
- Parent organization: Syracuse University
- Website: tully.syr.edu

The Tully Center for Free Speech is a research institution dedicated to the study, protection, and promotion of free speech in the S. I. Newhouse School of Public Communications at Syracuse University in Syracuse, New York. It also brings in speakers throughout the year who lecture in classes and at events at the Newhouse School and across the Syracuse University community. The center was founded in 2006 with a bequest from Joan A. Tully, an alumna of the Newhouse School & Daily Orange.

== History ==
=== Founding ===
The Tully Center for Free Speech was founded in 2006 in the wake of the deteriorating state of free speech and the public’s lack of access to information in the years after the September 11 attacks. Speaking at an inaugural event for the center, Floyd Abrams, a noted First Amendment attorney, highlighted the Bush administration's criticisms, ridicules, and threats against those who try to disseminate information and said that "almost everything in government is kept secret beyond any laws of reason."

The center was named after Joan A. Tully in recognition of her contributions. Tully wrote for the independent student newspaper The Daily Orange and graduated from Syracuse University with a degree in journalism and english in 1969. She worked for the AP Dow Jones Newswires in New York City, The Brussels Times in Brussels, Belgium, and later edited weekly newspapers in New Jersey. She graduated from Fordham University School of Law in 1983 and worked on First Amendment and land preservation issues before starting an antique textile business.

=== Events ===
In March 2012, the Tully Center for Free Speech’s Distinguished Speaker Series hosted free speech advocate Mary Beth Tinker. Tinker shared her experience of protesting the Vietnam War by wearing a black armband to school, being suspended for violating an unjust policy, and suing the school district with the help of the ACLU that led to a landmark decision by the U.S. Supreme Court that upheld students’ rights to free speech.

In March 2013, Larry Flynt presented a talk as the Tully Center's Distinguished Speaker to celebrate 25 years since the precedent-setting Hustler v. Falwell Supreme Court case. Other past speakers have included Daniel Ellsberg, New York Times reporter Brian Stelter, Amy Goodman of Democracy Now!, Floyd Abrams, Irving Feiner, and Alan Alda.

In April 2015, the Tully Center hosted a panel on whistleblowing and journalism. The speakers, including Kristina Borjesson, Louis Clark, and Thomas Tamm discussed the important role whistleblowers and the press play in promoting accountability and the challenges they face. Mary Beth Tinker returned to the Tully Center in October 2015 during Banned Book Week to discuss free speech rights and celebrate the First Amendment. In November, 2015, the Tully Center hosted Tech executive and owner of Aereo, Chet Kanojia, to discuss the shutdown of Aereo after the company was sued for copyright violations.

In conjunction with the Society of Professional Journalists and the Institute for Security Policy and Law at Syracuse University, the Tully Center hosted John F. Sopko who was appointed to be the Special Inspector General for Afghanistan Reconstruction in October 2016. Toward the end of 2016, The Tully Center hosted Free Speech Week, a week dedicated to advocating for the First Amendment.

In February 2017, the Tully Center held a screening of Tickling Giants, a documentary which followed how Dr. Bassem Youssef finds creative, non-violent ways to protect free speech and fight a president who abuses his power. From February to April 2017, The Tully Center hosted the speaker series, Law Politics and the Media. The speakers featured in this series include: Dahlia Lithwick, a Supreme Court Reporter; Tom Bruce, a pioneer for the Free Access to Law movement; Jennifer Borg, First Amendment lawyer; Jenny Diamond Cheng, lawyer and Vanderbilt researcher; and Matthew Levendusky, author and political scientist. Then, in April 2017, Dr. Changfeng Chen gave a lecture discussing internet governance in China. In October 2017, The Tully Center hosted Nadine Strossen, the former president of the American Civil Liberties Union for a discussion of Free Speech on College campuses. In October, the Tully Center launched a video series, which examined the major developments in First Amendment Law.

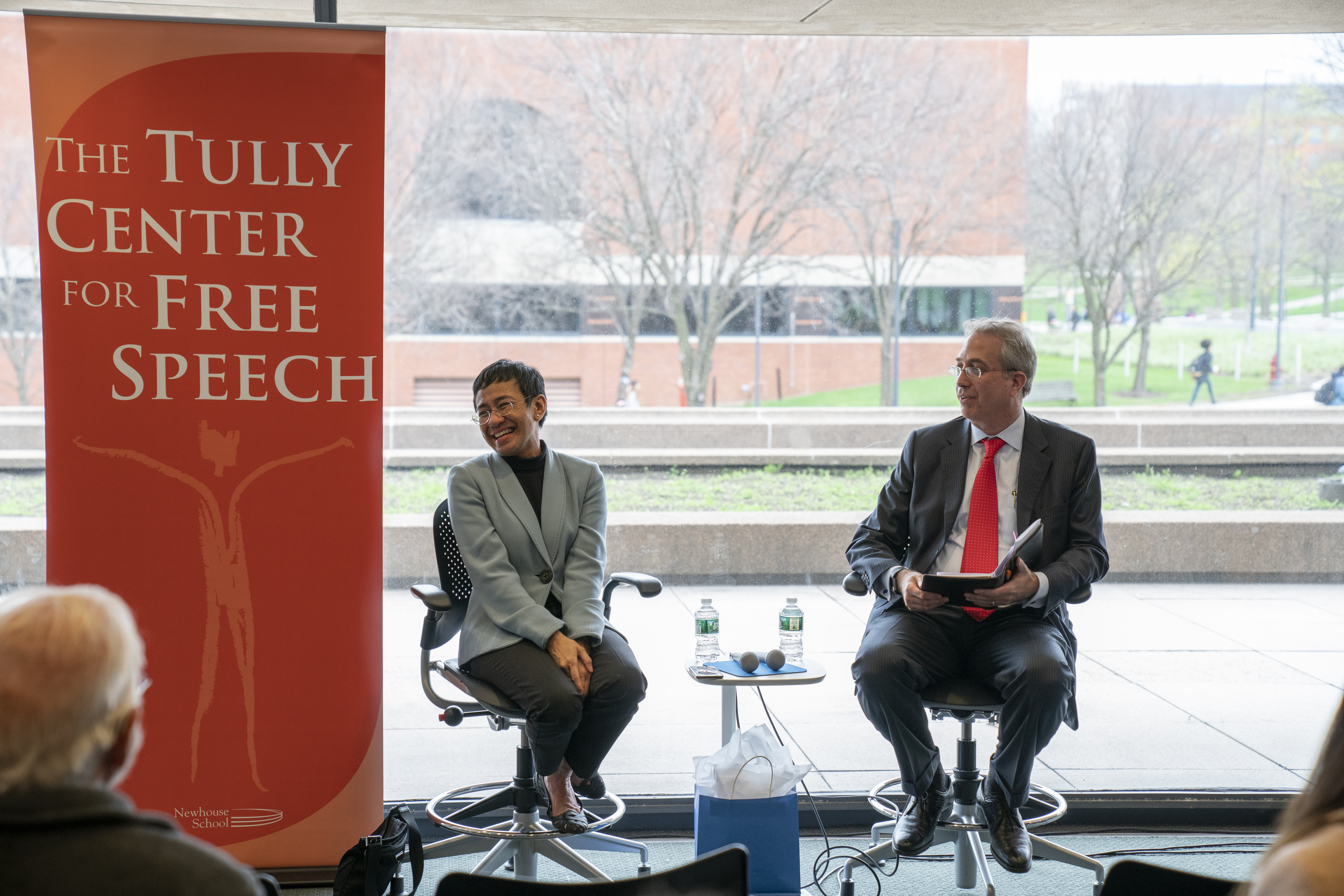
Journalist Maria Ressa, recipient of the 2018 Tully Free Speech Award, is interviewed by Tully Center Director, Roy S. Gutterman.

In April 2018, The Tully Center hosted Brett Orzechowski, author of FOIL: The Law and the Future of Public Information in New York, to discuss how the Freedom of Information Law remains a critical part of investigative reporting. Then, Lee Rainie, director of internet and technology research at the Pew Research Center, came to speak about factual reporting of public opinion polls in tense times. Later that year, The Tully Center brought in Rodney Sieh, a journalist who faced a 5,000 year jail sentence in Liberia for working as an independent journalist, to speak about his experiences and book Journalist on Trial.

The Tully Center kicked off their 2019 events calendar by hosting Nina Totenberg, renowned NPR correspondent, for a lecture on her experiences covering legal affairs. In April, The Tully Center presented Maria Ressa, a journalist and editor of online news platform Rappler, with the 2018 Tully Award for Free Speech for her coverage of Filipino President Rodrigo Duterte. In mid-September, The Tully Center hosted cartoonist Dwayne "Mr. Fish" Booth for a screening of documentary Mr.Fish: Cartooning from the Deep End.

== The Tully Award ==
The Tully Award is presented annually to a journalist who has shown courage in facing a free speech threat. Candidates are nominated by an international panel of journalists and lawyers, while the winner is selected by an Award Committee of SU faculty and students.

Tully Award for Free Speech Recipients by Year
Year	Name of Recipient	Photo	Country of origin	Honored for
2020	Igor Rudnikov		Russia	Igor Rudnikov is the owner and editor of Novye Kolyosa, an independent newspaper in the western Russian city of Kaliningrad. Rudnikov’s story is almost unbelievable. He has been repeatedly arrested and government authorities have spent years trying to shut down his newspaper. He has been severely beaten and injured by police on multiple occasions for his efforts to share the truth and speak freely.
2018	Maria Ressa		Philippines & United States	Maria Ressa is the founder, CEO, and executive editor of Rappler, a Philippine news website created in 2012. Ressa and the publication have been targeted by the Philippine government because of critical coverage of President Rodrigo Duterte's controversial policies and actions.
2017	Daphne Caruana Galizia		Malta	Galizia dedicated her career to exposing government corruption and organized crime in Malta. For decades, she continued to report despite facing threats, harassment, attacks, and 47 libel lawsuits. She died in a car bomb in October 2017.
2016	Jason Rezaian		United States	After reporting in Iran for more than five years, Rezaian was arrested for espionage and spent 544 days in one of Iran’s most notorious prisons.
2015	Kathy Gannon		Canada	For her heroic, relentless courage while working as a senior correspondent for the AP in Pakistan and Afghanistan. While covering an assignment for the Associated Press, an attack left Gannon with limited use of her hands and mortally wounded her coworker and friend Anja Niedringhaus.
2014	Alan Rusbridger		Northern Rhodesia & United Kingdom	Rusbridger is responsible for publishing reports from whistleblower Edward Snowden, a former National Security Agency contractor who leaked thousands of classified documents, which included details of American surveillance operations.
2013	Idrak Abbasov		Azerbaijan	In 2012 while filming protests against the state oil company, Abbasov was attacked by what he believed were oil company security forces and the police, but the Azerbaijani president denies the allegations. Despite the attack, he has remained dedicated to his job, and continued to work even while recovering from his injuries.
2012	Lamees Dhaif		Bahrain	When traditional outlets for her writing were unavailable, Dhaif turned to social media to cover hot button issues in Bahrain. In accepting the award, Dhaif dedicated it to a young protester who was killed by government forces.
2011	Umar Cheema		Pakistan	Pakistan has gained a reputation as one of the deadliest countries to be a journalist, and after reporting on the lack of accountability within the military, Cheema was abducted and brutally beaten.
2010	Lydia Cacho		Mexico	Cacho was honored for her commitment to reporting on women and children's rights. In 2005, Cacho was illegally arrested and tortured for her book, Los Demonios del Eden: El Poder Que Protege a la Pornografia Infantil, which exposed a Mexican child pornography ring operating with protection from Mexican politicians and businessmen.
2009	Barry Bearak & Frank Chikowore		United States & Zimbabwe	Bearak, a Pulitzer prize-winning American journalist, was jailed in Zimbabwe for covering the elections without government permission. He was taken into custody during a raid on a small hotel frequented by foreign journalists in Harare and held in prison for five days before being released on bail. Chikowore, a reporter for the Weekly Times before the Zimbabwe government authorities closed the paper in 2005, was also arrested for covering a strike organized by the opposition party and detained for 17 days while police tried and failed to accuse him of various crimes.
2008	Aboubakr Jamaï		Morocco	Jamaï faced a jail sentence and forced exile from his country over his dedication to exposing governmental corruption.
