= Monica Hampton =

American documentary filmmaker

- Born: United States
- Education: University of Maryland, College Park
- Occupations: Film producer, music video director

Monica Hampton is a New York-based narrative and documentary filmmaker. Her documentary film credits include Michael Moore's Fahrenheit 9/11, Heavy Metal in Baghdad, the 2008 documentary on Iraqi heavy metal band Acrassicauda and the 2008 documentary Slacker Uprising, a film about Michael Moore's 2004 tour across the United States. In 2005 she joined VICE (magazine) as Head of Production and Post Production of a new division of Vice Media created to make videos and documentaries, at the time the network would be called VBS.tv and would launch online in 2007. In 2000 she produced Kevin Smith's View Askew Productions' Vulgar, a narrative film directed by Bryan Johnson (comic book writer). She began her film career as an assistant director and production manager on low budget indie films in New York including Palookaville, Wishful Thinking (Drew Barrymore, Jon Stewart) and Chasing Amy (Ben Affleck, Jason Lee). She appears in front of the camera uncredited in Chasing Amy, Dogma and Vulgar. She produced Barnaby Clay's documentary Shot! The Psycho-Spiritual Mantra of Rock (2016) about rock photographer Mick Rock and a documentary entitled Tickling Giants on Egypt's Bassem Youssef. Both films premiered at the 2016 Tribeca Film Festival and both films were released theatrically in 2017.

In 2016, Hampton made her directorial debut directing Dean Ween of Ween's, first-ever solo music video for the song "Exercise Man". In 2017, Hampton reunited with Michael Moore to create the "Unfuck the World" music video, the debut music video for Prophets of Rage. Prophets of Rage, was of the rap rock supergroup composed of three members of Rage Against the Machine and Audioslave (bassist and backing vocalist Tim Commerford, guitarist Tom Morello, and drummer Brad Wilk), Public Enemy's DJ Lord and rapper Chuck D, and Cypress Hill rapper B-Real.

Hampton is a graduate of University of Maryland, College Park.

== Filmography ==
- Palookaville (1995)
- Chasing Amy (1997)
- Stag (1997)
- Dogma (1999)
- Vulgar (2000)
- Jay and Silent Bob Strike Back (2001)
- Rick (2003)
- Fahrenheit 9/11 (2004)
- Heavy Metal in Baghdad (2008)
- Slacker Uprising (2008)
- SHOT the Psycho-Spiritual Mantra of Rock (2016)
- Tickling Giants (2017)
