= Right to protest =

Type of political freedom

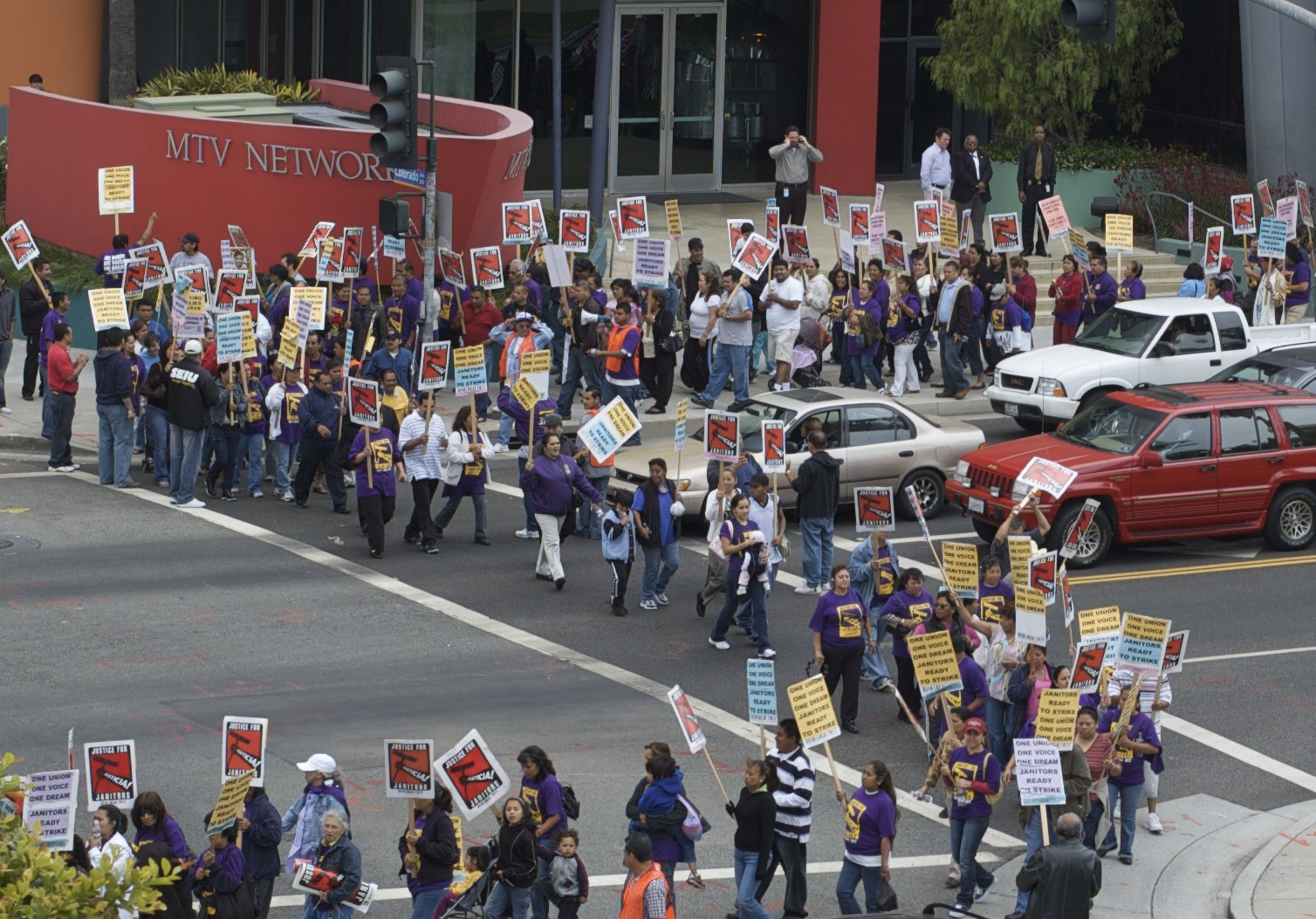
Janitorial workers exercising their right to protest in front of the MTV building in Santa Monica, California.

The right to protest may be a manifestation of the right to freedom of assembly, the right to freedom of association, and the right to freedom of speech. Additionally, protest and restrictions on protest have lasted as long as governments have.

== In international law ==
Many international treaties contain clear articulations of the right to protest. Such agreements include the 1950 European Convention on Human Rights, especially Articles 9 to 11; and the 1966 International Covenant on Civil and Political Rights, especially Articles 18 to 22. Articles 9 enunciates the "right to freedom of thought, conscience, and religion." Article 10 enunciates the "right to freedom of expression." Article 11 enunciates the "right to freedom of association with others, including the right to form and to join trade unions for the protection of his interests." However, in these and other agreements the rights of freedom of assembly, freedom of association, and freedom of speech are subject to certain limitations.

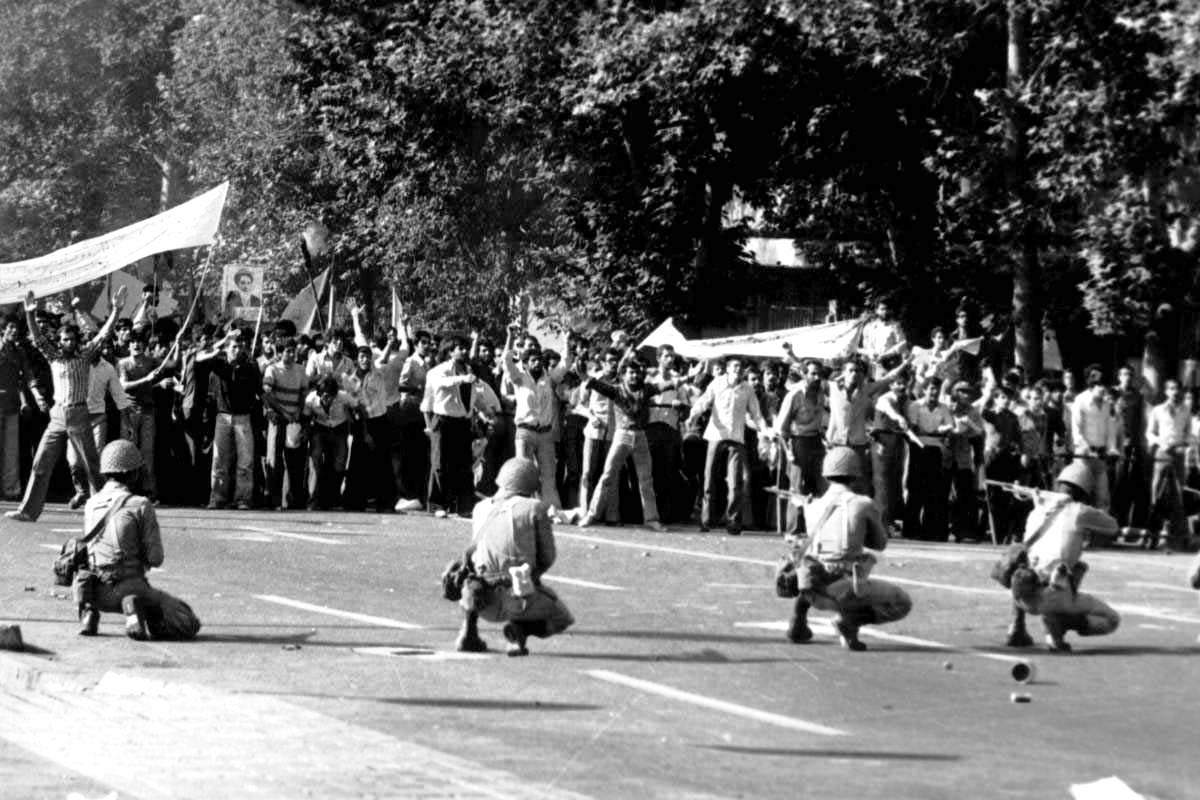
Black Friday in Tehran, 8 September 1978.

For example, the International Covenant on Civil and Political Rights contains prohibitions on "propaganda of war" and advocacy of "national, racial or religious hatred"; and it allows the restriction of the freedom to assembly if it is necessary "in a democratic society in the interests of national security or public safety, public order, the protection of public health or morals or the protection of the rights and freedoms of others." (Articles 20 and 21) Different places have passed their own clarification of these rights.

Protesting, however, is not necessarily violent or a threat to the interests of national security or public safety. Nor is it necessarily civil disobedience, when protesting does not involve violating the laws of the state. Protests, even campaigns of nonviolent resistance, or civil resistance, can often have the character (in addition to using nonviolent methods) of positively supporting a democratic and constitutional order. This can happen, for example, when such resistance arises in response to a military coup d'état; or in the somewhat similar case of a refusal of the state leadership to surrender office following defeat in an election.

== At private institutions ==
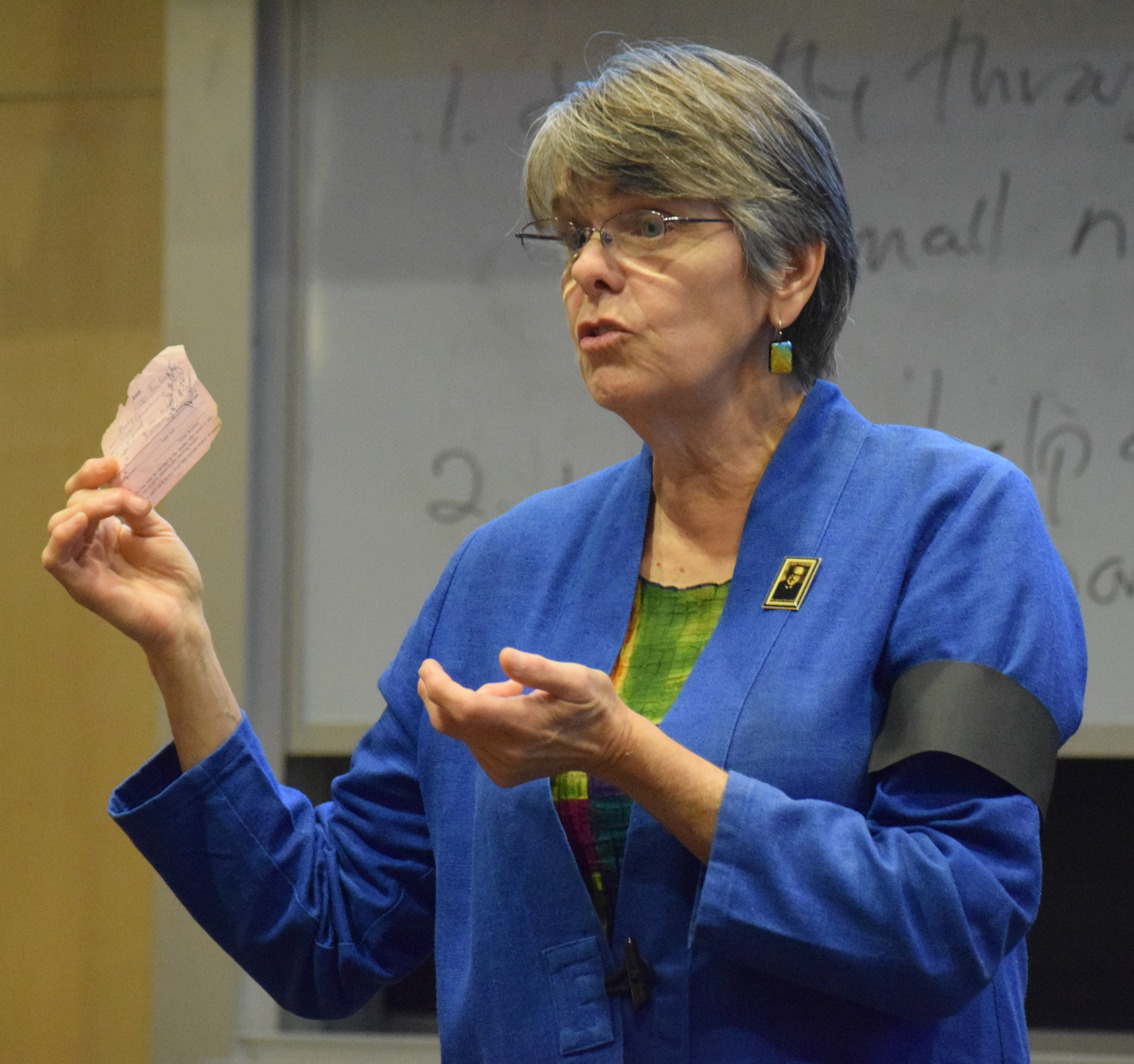
Mary Beth Tinker was given detention for wearing a black armband to protest the Vietnam War, leading to the Tinker v. Des Moines case.

Many employers, educational institutions, and professional associations maintain demonstration policies that limit the rights of their members to protest, for instance by restricting them to free speech zones. In the United States, the landmark 1969 Tinker v. Des Moines Supreme Court case established the student right to protest so long as it does not cause "substantial disruption".

== See also ==
- Direct action
- Demonstration (protest)
- Protest
- Right of revolution
