= Jon Stewart: The Kennedy Center Mark Twain Prize for American Humor =

- Genre: Variety
- Directed by: Marcus Raboy
- Starring: Dave Chappelle; Steve Carell; Stephen Colbert; John Oliver; Ed Helms; Olivia Munn; Samantha Bee; Bassem Youssef; Jon Meacham; Jimmy Kimmel; Bruce Springsteen; Pete Davidson
- Country of origin: United States
- Original language: English

Production
- Producers: Kevin Hermanson; Connor Malbeuf; Michael B. Matuza; Phil Rosenberg
- Editor: Aaron Champion
- Running time: 90 minutes

Original release
- Network: PBS
- Release: June 21, 2022

Jon Stewart: The Kennedy Center Mark Twain Prize for American Humor was a variety special that aired June 21, 2022 on PBS. The show honored comedian Jon Stewart who was being awarded with the Mark Twain Prize for American Humor which was presented at the John F. Kennedy Center for the Performing Arts in Washington D.C.

Stewart is a comedian, talk show host and political commentator who started his career as a standup in New York City before gaining fame for hosting the Comedy Central satirical news program The Daily Show from 1999 to 2015. He is also known as a champion and activist for the 9/11 First Responders. Those who helped celebrate his accomplishments included former Daily Show alumni Steve Carell, John Oliver, Stephen Colbert, Ed Helms, Olivia Munn, and Samantha Bee as well as comedians Dave Chappelle, Bassem Youssef, Pete Davidson, and Jimmy Kimmel and historian Jon Meacham. Musician Bruce Springsteen served as the musical guest performing "Come Together" and "Born to Run".

The event was filmed and shown on PBS. The broadcast of the ceremony was similar to the previous ceremony, Dave Chappelle: The Kennedy Center Mark Twain Prize for American Humor in 2019, in that it used archival footage of Dave Chappelle performing standup, clips from The Daily Show with Jon Stewart and Stewart's testimony at the congressional hearing for the 9/11 Victim's Compensation Fund.

== History ==
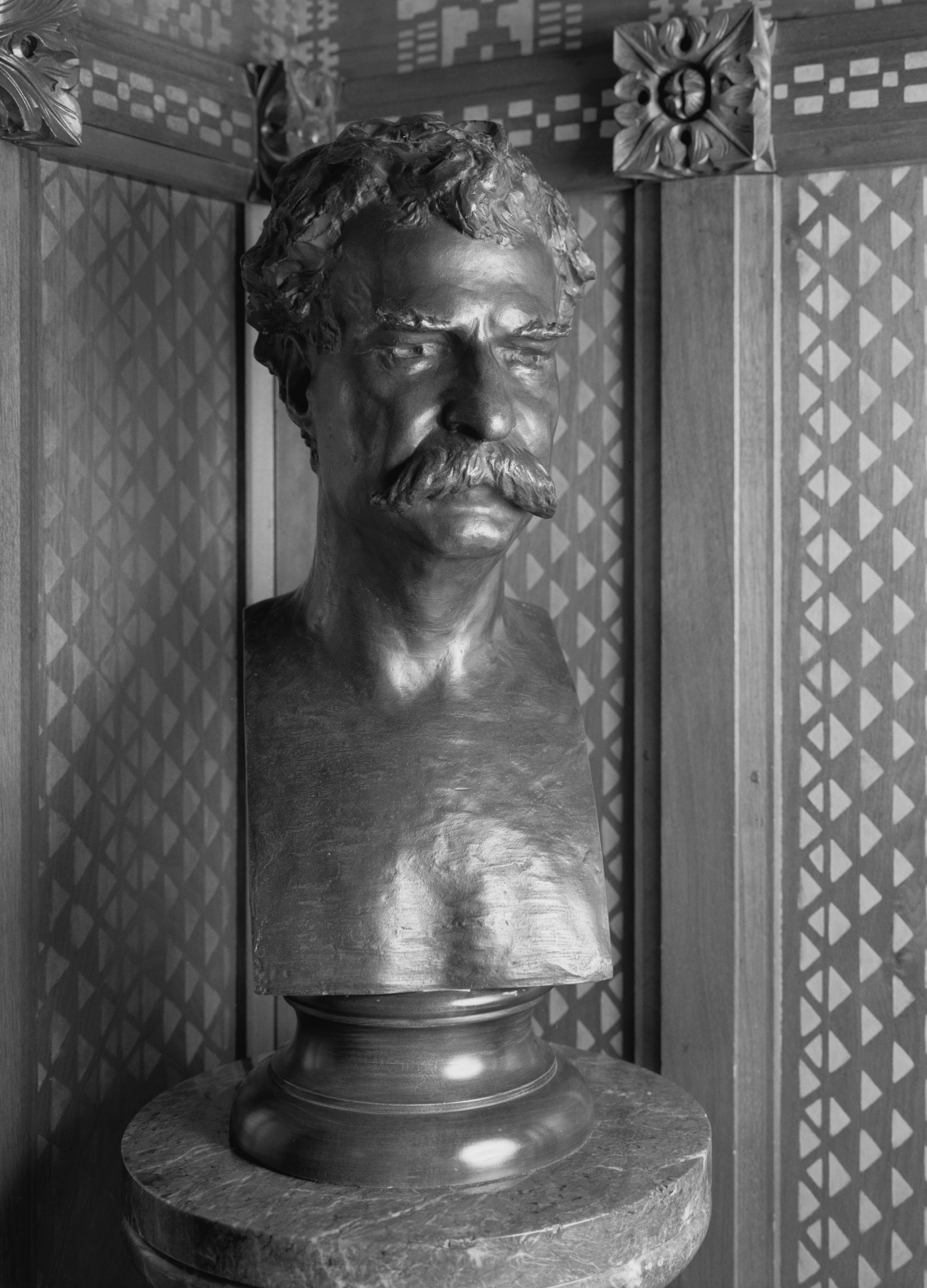
the bust of the Mark Twain Prize for American Humor

The ceremony was dedicated to the 23rd recipient of the Mark Twain Prize for American Humor, Jon Stewart. The first recipient of this award was given to Richard Pryor in 1998 and has since been awarded to numerous comedians such as Bob Newhart, George Carlin, Whoopi Goldberg, Billy Crystal, Steve Martin, Tina Fey, Carol Burnett, Bill Murray, Eddie Murphy, Julia Louis-Dreyfus, and Dave Chappelle. The prize remains the highest honor a comedian can receive.

The award, named after the 19th-century humorist Mark Twain who famously wrote American classics such as The Adventures of Tom Sawyer (1876), and The Adventures of Huckleberry Finn (1884). The award is presented to individuals who have "had an impact on American society in ways similar to" Twain. The award was presented at the John F. Kennedy Center for the Performing Arts in Washington, D.C., where it has been presented annually since 1998.

When accepting the award, Stewart spoke about the threats to comedy saying:

"Comedy doesn’t change the world, but it’s a bellwether. We’re the banana peel in the coal mine. When a society is under threat, comedians are the ones who get sent away first. It’s just a reminder to people that democracy is under threat. Authoritarians are the threat to comedy, to art, to music, to thought, to poetry, to progress, to all those things.”

== Performers ==
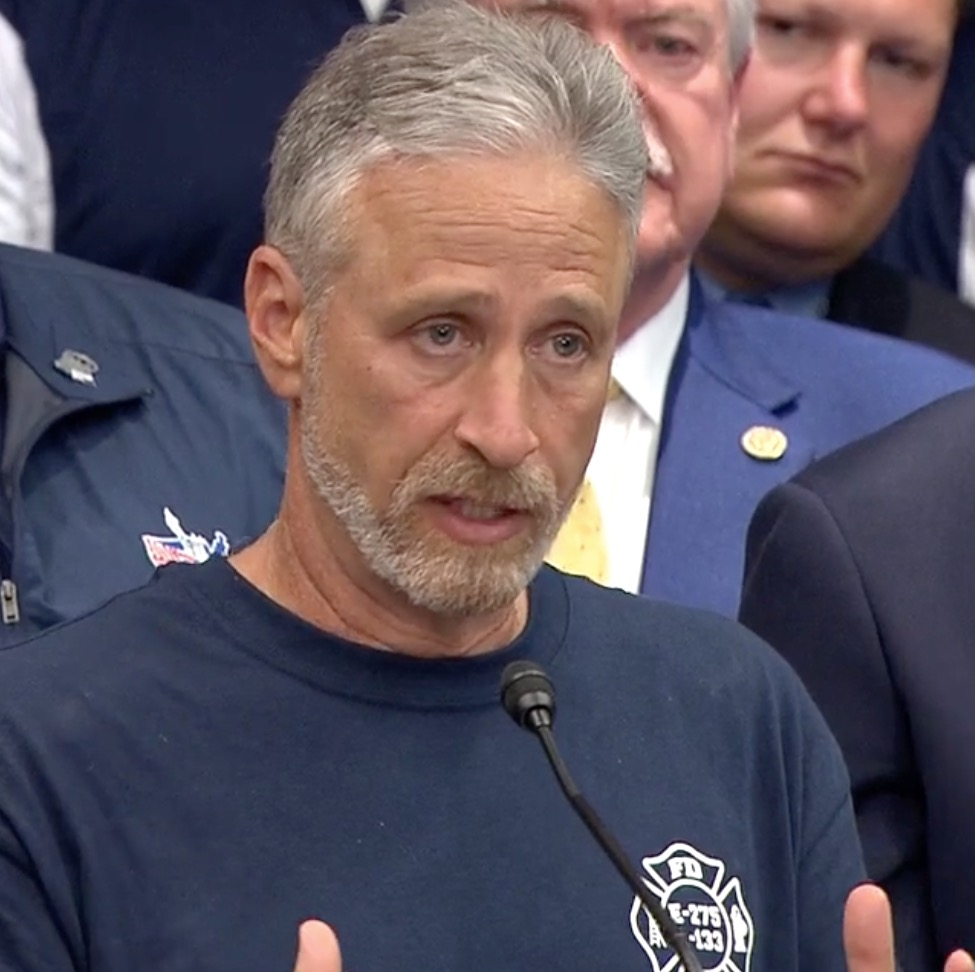
Stewart in 2019

In order of appearance

* Notes former The Daily Show correspondents

Performer	Notes
Dave Chappelle	Discussed his personal and professional relationship with Stewart at The Comedy Cellar in the 1990s.
Pete Davidson	Discussed Stewarts impact working with the 9/11 first responders and the Congressional testimony he gave on their behalf
Olivia Munn*	Joked about her working relationship with Stewart on The Daily Show with Jon Stewart
Samantha Bee*	Praised Stewart for highlighting racial and gender diversity among The Daily Show
Steve Carell*	Joked about the field assignments he would have to do on The Daily Show
Jimmy Kimmel	Made jokes at himself and working at The Man Show on Comedy Central
Bassem Youssef	Talked about Stewarts influence on him in Egypt and the impact he has had internationally
John Oliver*	Sent in a pre-taped video making jokes about Stewart's death
Ed Helms*	Sang a various songs dressed as a dapper dan
Jon Meacham	The journalist talked about Stewart's love of country, and ability to speak truth to power.
Stephen Colbert*	Spoke about his personal and professional friendship with Stewart at The Daily Show
Jon Feil; Israel Guiterez Del Toro	Two 9/11 first responders presented Stewart with the prize.

Musical performers

- Bruce Springsteen and Gary Clark Jr. opened the show with a rendition of The Beatles song "Come Together"
- Bruce Springsteen performed an acoustic version of his song "Born to Run"

In the audience:

- Pete and Chasten Buttigieg
- Jason Jones
- Kim Kardashian
- John Mulaney
- Yvonne Orji
- Nancy Pelosi
- Jen Psaki

== Production ==
The broadcast of the ceremony was similar to the previous ceremony, Dave Chappelle: The Kennedy Center Mark Twain Prize for American Humor in 2019, in that it used archival footage of Stewart's career. The clips included were from the 1990s MTV late-night program, The Jon Stewart Show, his Comedy Central show The Daily Show and his advocacy work for 9/11 first responders including his testimony at the congressional hearing for the 9/11 Victim's Compensation Fund.

Clips were interspersed of Stewart with fellow comedians, family members, producers and Pete Buttigieg at the Winebar in Washington, D.C.
