= Tickling Giants =

- Poster
- Directed by: Sara Taksler
- Written by: Sara Taksler
- Produced by: Maziar Bahari; Monica Hampton; Frederic Rose; Sara Taksler
- Starring: Bassem Youssef; Jon Stewart
- Cinematography: Wail Gzoly
- Music by: Paul Tyan
- Release date: March 15, 2017
- Running time: 111 minutes
- Country: United States
- Languages: English; Arabic
- Box office: $51,500

Tickling Giants is a 2017 American documentary film directed by Sara Taksler, about the story of Bassem Youssef, who, in the midst of the 2011 Egyptian revolution, left his job as a heart surgeon to become a full-time comedian. Dubbed "The Egyptian Jon Stewart," Bassem creates the satirical show Al Bernameg. Tickling Giants follows the team of Al Bernameg as they endure physical threats, protests, and legal action as a result of the show.

== Reception ==
On the review aggregator website Rotten Tomatoes, the film has a 100% approval rating based on 24 reviews, with an average rating of 7.3/10. The website's consensus reads, "Tickling Giants offers a powerful demonstration of how satire can influence government policy – and a sobering warning regarding the double-edged effects of regime change." On Metacritic, the film has a score of 78 out of 100 based on 11 reviews, indicating "generally favorable reviews". Owen Gleiberman of Variety wrote, "Mostly, the movie makes you understand how every society – and ours more than ever – needs people like Bassem Youssef to demonstrate that laughter will always be one of the essential ways to keep power in check."

== See also ==
- Arab Spring
