= Heavy Metal in Baghdad =

2007 American rockumentary film

- Directed by: Suroosh Alvi; Eddy Moretti
- Written by: Bernardo Loyola; Suroosh Alvi
- Produced by: Spike Jonze (executive producer); Shane Smith; Eddy Moretti; Suroosh Alvi; Monica Hampton
- Starring: Suroosh Alvi; Firas Al Lateef; Faisal Talal; Marwan Reyad; Tony Aziz
- Music by: Acrassicauda
- Distributed by: VBS.tv
- Release dates: 8 September 2007 (Toronto International Film Festival); 23 May 2008 (United States)
- Running time: 84 minutes
- Countries: United States; Canada
- Languages: English; Arabic

Heavy Metal in Baghdad is a 2007 rockumentary film following filmmakers Eddy Moretti and Suroosh Alvi as they track down the Iraqi heavy metal band Acrassicauda amidst the Iraq War.

== Synopsis ==
In 2003, the Iraqi heavy-metal band Acrassicauda was the subject of a Vice magazine article. With the magazine's help, they were able to stage a sell-out show in 2005 despite the recent ousting of Saddam Hussein. Filmmakers from Vice returned to Iraq in 2006 to track down the band. Upon their return they discovered the multitude of death and destruction, including rehearsing studios destroyed by bombs.

Candid interviews with the band members allow an insight into a sub section of society steeped in American pop culture and the hostilities this attracts.

== Production ==
The film was shot over three years. Filming locations included Baghdad and Erbil in Iraq, Beirut, Lebanon and Damascus, Syria. The film was distributed by VBS.tv, part of the Vice media conglomerate. During the filming it was revealed that the Syrian government did not intend to extend the visas of the band to stay in Syria; as a result, the filmmakers campaigned to raise funds to relocate the band in a safer country, rather than return to Iraq. In 2009, the band were resettled in the United States as refugees.

== Release ==
The film premiered at the 2007 Toronto International Film Festival on 8 September 2007. This was followed by a 10 February screening at the Berlin International Film Festival. On 13 March 2008, it was screened at Greece's Thessaloniki Documentary Festival.

It received an official theatrical release in the United States on 23 May 2008 and a limited theatrical release in the United Kingdom on 12 September 2008.

The film has been screened at several other international film festivals, including Mexico's Expresión en Corto International Film Festival on 24 July 2008. This was followed by a 21 September 2008 screening at Finland's Helsinki International Film Festival. Further European festival screenings in 2008 took place on 25 September at Iceland's Reykjavík International Film Festival, 10 October screening at Belgium's Ghent International Film Festival and Poland's Warsaw International Filmfest on 10 October also.

=== DVD ===
The film was released on DVD in the United States on 10 June. The collector's edition includes over 90 minutes of bonus material. This includes a 45-minute featurette, seven additional and deleted scenes (live performances and interviews), an 8-page booklet including the original Vice magazine article "No War For Heavy Metal" as well as a teaser trailer.

=== Book ===
A book accompanying the film was released in 2009, titled "Heavy Metal in Baghdad - The Story of Acrassicauda". The book was edited by Andy Capper, editor of Vice magazine in the UK and Europe. The book offers an oral history of the band's journey, made up of extended interviews with key members.

== Reception ==
On the review aggregator website Rotten Tomatoes, 83% of 24 critics' reviews are positive, with an average rating of 6.4/10. The website's consensus reads: "Despite being a Gonzo-esque rockumentary following the fortunes of Iraq's one and only heavy metal band, Acrassicauda, Heavy Metal is actually a moving and impassioned account of the middle-east crisis."

The New York Times praised the film as "An intrepid, unlikely and altogether splendid feat of D.I.Y. reportage...Both a stirring testament to the plight of cultural expression in Baghdad and a striking report on the refugee scene in Syria, this rock-doc like no other electrifies its genre and redefines headbanging as an act of hard-core courage."

The Los Angeles Times described the film as "More than just another Iraq-doc, 'Heavy Metal' is a surprisingly up-close look at the toll of the war on young people, and how they still have dreams and still want to jam, party and get down. If 'Once' was about the romance of creativity, Heavy Metal in Baghdad is about the total, unrelenting obsession. They have no choice. They must rock."

Reporting on film premiering at the 2007 TIFF, Rolling Stone described the film as "the most powerful music film" of the festival.

The film also garnered favourable reactions from leading British publications such as The Daily Telegraph and The Guardian. The former praised the film in that it "brings home the cultural as well as the human violence meted out to that gorgeous capital more powerfully than many more exalted documentaries...Though they struggle to build a fan base, and end up seeking refuge in Syria, their dreams persist, still blazing fiercely at the close of this chastening and inspiring film." The Guardian described the film as "fascinating".
