= Suroosh Alvi =

Pakistani-Canadian journalist and filmmaker (born 1969)

- سروش علوی
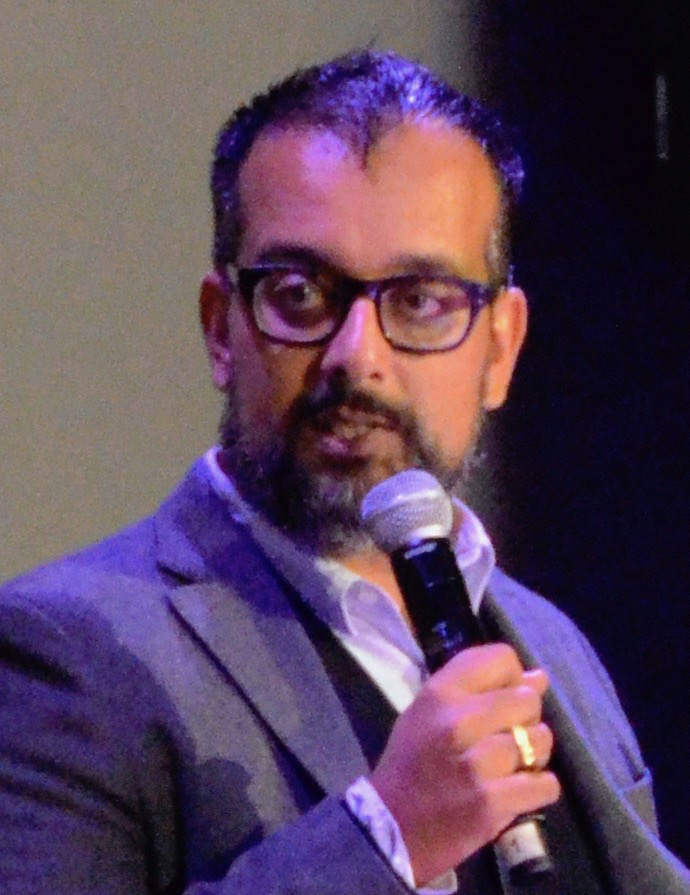
- Alvi in 2016
- Born: 26 March 1969 (age 57); Toronto, Ontario, Canada
- Education: McGill University
- Occupations: Journalist; filmmaker
- Known for: Co-founder of VICE Media
- Children: 1
- Mother: Sajida S. Alvi

Suroosh Alvi (Urdu: سروش علوی; born 26 March 1969) is a Canadian journalist and filmmaker. He is a co-founder of Vice Media, a digital media and broadcasting brand that at its height of operation was distributed in over 50 countries. Alvi is a travelled journalist and an executive producer of film, covering youth culture, news, and music globally. He has hosted and produced documentaries investigating controversial issues, armed conflicts, movements, and subcultures, including conflict minerals in the Democratic Republic of the Congo, the Iraq War, the takeover of Gaza by Hamas in the Israeli–Palestinian conflict, and the rise of the Pakistani Taliban and global terrorism.

Originally covering Montreal's alternative culture scene, VICE has expanded to include a network of digital properties, including VICE.com, TheCreatorsProject.com, Motherboard.tv, and Noisey.com as well as a cable and OTT network, a record label, an in-house creative services agency and a book publishing division. Today, VICE produces dozens of original video series, covering news, travel, music, arts, fashion and food, and has a network of correspondents and bureaus. As a journalist, Alvi has reported for VICE on HBO and VICE News, which together have received both Emmy and Peabody awards.

== Early life ==
Alvi was born in Toronto, Ontario, to Pakistani parents, both of whom are academics; his mother is Sajida S. Alvi, whose focus is on Islamic studies and Mughal history and who is now professor emerita at McGill University, and his father is Sabir A. Alvi, professor emeritus in psychology at the University of Toronto. Alvi studied philosophy at McGill University.

== Career ==
Alvi launched VICE magazine with Shane Smith and Gavin McInnes in Montreal in 1996, after the three men bought its precursor, Voices of Montreal, from Interimages Communications.

In 2002, Alvi created VICE Music, the company's record label which has partnered with over 50 artists and sold more than 7 million albums worldwide. Its clients have included Snoop Dogg, Action Bronson, Black Lips, Justice, Chromeo, The Streets, Bloc Party, and Death From Above 1979. In 2011, Alvi launched a partnership between VICE Music and Warner Bros. Records.

In 2006, as VICE was expanding from magazine publishing to video reporting, Alvi reported on a segment titled Gun Markets of Pakistan, in which he travelled to Pakistan's northwestern tribal areas to cover illegal mass weapons production that was flourishing in the fallout of the Soviet–Afghan War. Since then, he has covered stories from around the world, reporting on conflicts and unrest in the Democratic Republic of the Congo, Pakistan, Afghanistan, Iraq, and the Gaza Strip. He has also produced and hosted documentaries for VICE on HBO, VICE News and the VICE Guide to Travel series.

In 2007, Alvi co-directed and executive-produced Heavy Metal in Baghdad for VICE Films, in which he travels to Iraq and follows the heavy metal band Acrassicauda during the fall of Saddam Hussein amidst the Iraq War, beginning in 2003 after the United States-led invasion of Iraq. The film was an official selection at the 2007 Toronto International Film Festival and the 2008 Berlin International Film Festival, and was named Best Documentary at the 2008 Warsaw Film Festival.

In 2012, Alvi along with director Andy Capper travelled VICE to Jamaica, where he produced the feature-length film, REINCARNATED, featuring Snoop Dogg. The film was accepted at the 2012 Toronto International Film Festival and had its U.S. premiere at the 2013 SXSW festival.

In 2014, Alvi served as a guest curator for the PHI Centre in Montreal and oversaw a month's worth of programming.

In 2017, VICE launched a multi-part series hosted by Alvi that examines "the origins and impact of the world's deadliest terrorist organizations: al-Qaeda in Yemen, al-Shabaab in Somalia, Boko Haram in Nigeria, the Tehrik-i-Taliban in Pakistan and the Islamic State in Iraq."

In 2020, the VICE Guide to Iran, hosted by Alvi, was released shortly after the Islamic Revolutionary Guard Corps' shoot-down of Ukraine International Airlines Flight 752 during an Iran–United States standoff as part of the 2019-2021 Persian Gulf crisis. In the feature-length documentary, Alvi interviews ordinary Iranians about life under the Islamic government and covers the impact of international sanctions on the country after the 1979 Islamic Revolution. He also interviews prominent Iranian political figures, including Masoumeh Ebtekar and Hossein Sheikholeslam, who were among the students involved in the 1979–1981 Iran hostage crisis. Sheikholeslam died in March 2020 after contracting COVID-19, one month prior to the documentary's release.

== Personal life ==
Alvi resides in New York City. He is married, and has a son. He struggled with a heroin addiction in his youth, and was in recovery following rehabilitation when he co-founded VICE magazine in 1994.

== Filmography ==
Alvi has producer, executive producer, writer or director credits on a range of documentary films, documentary shorts and television series.

=== Television ===
- The Vice Guide to Everything (2010)
- Vice Meets (2011)
- Upgrade (2011)
- Epicly Later'd (2011)
- Dalston Superstars (2011)
- Powder and Rails (2011)
- The Vice Guide to Travel (2011)
- Picture Perfect (2011)
- Art Talk (2011)
- Motherboard (2011)
- Behind the Seams (2012)
- Discotecture (2012)
- Far Out (2012)
- Vice (2013)
- Vice News (2014)
- Vice News: Russian Roulette — the Invasion of Ukraine (2014)
- Abandonware (2015)
- Moj Sport (2015)
- Cut-Off (2016)
- Fuck, That's Delicious (2016)
- Vice Essentials Canada (2016)
- Tattoo Age (2017)
- Vice News: Terror (2017)
- World of Vice (2017)

=== Documentaries ===
Feature-length

- Heavy Metal in Baghdad (2006)
- Heavy Metal in Istanbul (2008)
- North Korean Film Madness (2010)
- Aokigahara: Suicide Forest (2011)
- The Vice Guide to Congo (2011)
- Toxic Amazon (2011)
- Reincarnated (2012)
- Lil Bub and Friendz (2013)
- Svddxnly (2014)
- Cocaine and Crude (2014)
- Shelter (2016)
- VICE Guide to Iran (2020)
- Showgirls of Pakistan (2021)

Shorts

- Gun Markets of Pakistan (2006)
- Tokoloshe (2010)
- Life after Bin Laden in Pakistan (2011)
- Tokyo Rising (2011)
- The Rebels of Libya (2011)
- Rule Britannia: The British Wrester (2012)
- Vice Guide to Karachi: Battle of Lyari (2012)
- Cowboy Capitalists (2013)
- The Vice Podcast Show (2013)
- In Saddam's Shadow: Baghdad 10 Years After the Invasion (2013)
- Korean Poo Wine (2013)
- The Elmore B&S Ball (2013)
- My Life Online: The Grim Loner (2014)
- Blood Debt (2014)
- Rooted (2015)
- Inside the Monkey Lab (2015)
- Inside the Superhuman World of the Iceman (2015)
- Blast Fishing in Montenegro (2015)
- Valley of the Islamic Dolls (2015)
- Kanabis Ismedju Bola i Zakona (2015)
- Krivolovci: Hunting for Poachers in Siberia (2015)
- Svet Suspenzija/World of Suspension (2015)
- Izvan Granica Seksa (2016)
- Behind the Zero Line (2016)
- Making Contact (2017)
- Vice Talks Week with Prime Minister Justin Trudeau (2017)
- Turbotronik (2017)
- Izpravljanie Krivine (2017)
