= Lamees Dhaif =

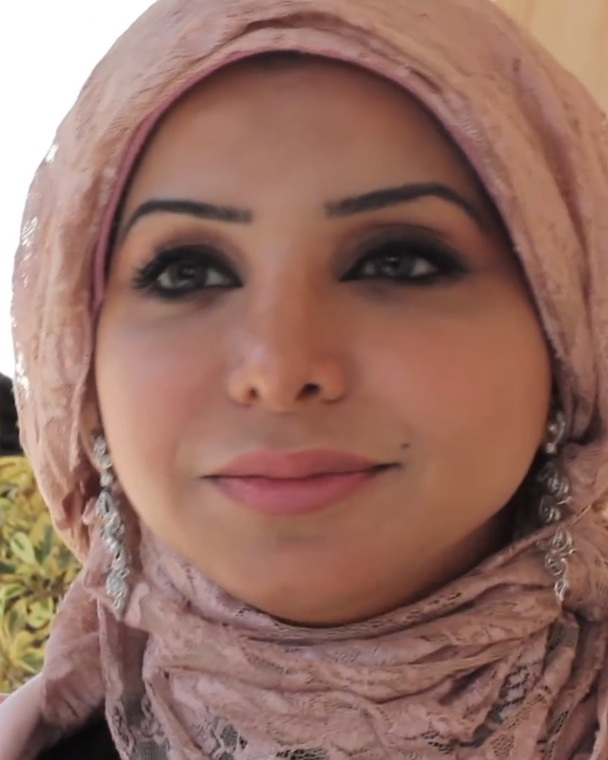
Lamees Dhaif, May 4, 2012.

Lamees Dhaif (Arabic: لميس ضيف) is a Bahraini journalist, renowned for social criticism, including satirical articles. She has written in various newspapers, including AlAyam, Akhbar Al Khaleej, AlYaum, AlWaqt, AlQabas, and AlRai in the Persian Gulf region. Currently, she has a column in AlShabiba newspaper.

== Education ==
Bachelor's of Art in Media & Political Science (University of Kuwait) Postgraduate Diploma in Media (University of St. Joseph, Lebanon) Postgraduate Diploma in Media (Ahlia University, Bahrain) Master's of Science in Media Legislation (Ahlia University, Bahrain) Master's of Information & Public Relations (Cairo University-Center for Studies & Research) Doctor of Philosophy in Media and Mass Communication from University of Hull. The thesis was titled "The role of social media and its effect on political change"

== Career ==
Dhaif became famous when she presented a program on Al-Rai, a private Kuwaiti television channel which talked about taboo issues such as poverty, sadism, prostitution, corruption, and inequality. It also included social issues such as enslavement of foreign labor and problems faced by local women who married foreigners.

She also worked as a researcher in Al Jazeera Center for Studies (May 2011 – 2013) and was the director and producer for the TV show "Stations" that was aired from London on Lualua Satellite Channel (2013-2014). She is also the Editor in chief at RASED e-newspaper, Oman since 2017.

Dhaif is popular among youth and intellectuals, but her articles have always aroused controversy. A legal case was filed against her after she harshly criticized corrupt judges, however, the case was suspended because of pressure from both local and international organizations.

Dhaif is also a human rights activist and was a member of the board of directors of the Bahraini Journalists Association for three consecutive rounds. She faces fierce criticism because of her opposition to corruption.

She has also worked on various charity campaigns to help needy families and unfortunate students who did not receive scholarships because they belonged to a certain sect.

== Honours ==
Lamees Dhaif has won several awards including: Best Investigative Report in 2004, the Excellence Award in Journalism in 2008 (in the Second Regional Conference on Women), and was honored as best writer by the Women's Union in the International Women's Day in 2009. She also won "Bahrain Woman of the Year" in 2009. She was also awarded the Freedom of Speech Award from the Tully Center in New York in October 2012. Dhaif was voted among the most popular women on Twitter in the Arab World according to the magazine "Arageek"
