= Umar Cheema =

Pakistani journalist

- Born: 1976 (age 49–50)
- Occupation: Journalist
- Organization: The News
- Awards: International Press Freedom Award

Umar Cheema (Urdu: عمر چیمہ) is a journalist and investigative reporter for the Pakistani newspaper The News. In 2008, he won a Daniel Pearl Journalism Fellowship, becoming the first Pearl fellow to work at The New York Times.

== Education ==
Cheema holds a master's degree in mass communication from Punjab University in Lahore. He also attended London School of Economics as a Chevening Scholar (Chevening Scholarship), doing M.Sc. in Comparative Politics (Conflict studies).

== Career ==
Cheema's investigative reporting on sensitive issues of corruption and military interference in politics has made him many powerful enemies. Cheema has contributed to global investigative journalism teams, examining the Panama Papers, Paradise Papers, Pandora Papers, and Swiss Bank disclosures.

== Kidnapping ==
On 4 September 2010, he was abducted, beaten, flogged and sexually assaulted by a group of assailants. They also shaved his head, eyebrows, and mustache. Cheema reported that his attackers asked him if he was trying to discredit the government with his reporting, leading him to believe that they were from Pakistan's Inter-Services Intelligence agency.

== Aftermath ==
Following the incident, The New York Times issued an editorial, calling on the Pakistani government to find out who abducted Mr. Cheema and bring them to justice." The Committee to Protect Journalists echoed the call, describing the attack as "a message sent to all journalists in Pakistan" that must be answered. For his brave journalism and willingness to publicly speak about the attack at risk of his own life, the CPJ awarded Cheema its 2011 International Press Freedom Award, "an annual recognition of courageous journalism". In his acceptance speech, Cheema thanked the group for its "recognition of the bold work Pakistani media is doing". On 14 April 2011, Cheema also received the Tully Center Free Speech Award of Syracuse University.

Cheema is the father of a son and a daughter. Adil, his son, was two years old when Cheema was abducted.

== See also ==
- List of kidnappings
- List of solved missing person cases (post-2000)
