= Al-Fanar Hotel =

Hotel in Baghdad, Iraq

Al-Fanar Hotel (Arabic, فندق الفنار) is a hotel in Baghdad, Iraq. It is popular with independent travelers to the city. It is also the place where the Iraqi Heavy Metal band Acrassicauda played their last concert inside Iraq.

It is across the street from the Palestine Hotel, and is located at 33°18′57″N 44°25′01″E.
