= Sajida Alvi =

Pakistani-Canadian academic (born 1941)

- Born: Sajida S. Alvi; 1941 (age 84–85); Pakistan
- Citizenship: Canadian
- Occupations: Academic, historian
- Children: Suroosh Alvi

Sajida S. Alvi (born 1941) is an academic of Pakistani origin in Canada. She is a historian of Islam in South Asia and was the inaugural appointment to the chair in Urdu Language and Culture at the Institute of Islamic Studies from September 1987 until her retirement in June 2010.

== Life ==
Alvi moved to Canada in January 1967 as a Post-doctoral Fellow at the University of Toronto. She accepted a teaching position at the Institute of Islamic Studies, McGill University, Montreal, in 1972; she taught there for five years and then moved to the University of Minnesota in 1977. After receiving tenure and promotion at the University of Minnesota, she returned to McGill University in 1986.

She is the first appointee to an endowed Chair in Urdu Language and Culture (funded by the Government of Pakistan, Department of Multiculturalism, Government of Canada and McGill University), and is a Professor of Indo-Islamic History at McGill University.

Alvi has lectured in Canada and the United States on Islam, aspects of Islamic civilization, and women's issues, and works with the Canadian Council of Muslim Women regarding women's issues. She also worked various Boards of Education in Ontario to support and enhance the instruction of heritage languages programs with special reference to Urdu with funding from the Department of Multiculturalism.

== Works ==
Amongst Sajida Alvi's contributions her efforts to make Mughal sources more accessible has won her scholastic acclaim; these include her critical edition of Aurangzeb's history, Mir’at al-‘Alam: History of Emperor Awangzeb Alamgir (2 vols); and her translation and edition of a mirror for princes from the reign of the Mughal emperor Jahangir Advice on the Art of Governance: An Indo-Islamic Mirror for Princes (Mau‘izah-i Jahangiri) of Muhammad Baqir Najm-i Sani.

She has contributed chapters and brief notes to the Encyclopaedia of Islam, Encyclopædia Iranica, The Muslim Almanac: A Reference Work on the History, Faith, Culture, and People of Islam, Encyclopaedia of the Modern Islamic World, and Encyclopaedia of Religion. Her current two-volume research project in progress is: “Khanqah and Madrasah and Chishtiyya Sufis: Agents of Social Change and Spiritual Rejuvenation in the British Punjab (1750-1850).”

== Educator ==
She directed and edited a pioneering Urdu Instructional Materials Development Project. With the team of 10 members and 5 Boards of Education in Ontario Province, Alvi developed first set of books for junior and senior kindergarten and grade one, Urdu for Children: Book One (4 volumes plus set of two audiocassettes) in 1997. The second set of books in the series for grades two and three, Urdu for Children: Book Two (7 volumes and a set of two CDs) was published in October 2004. This project was sponsored and funded by the Canadian Government, and Urdu texts and related materials were published by the McGill-Queen’s University Press.

On the hijab, Alvi undertook another major project at the request of the Canadian Council of Muslim Women, and completed it in collaboration with two colleagues from Concordia University as co-editors and contributors along with some graduate students. It culminated in the publication of Muslim Veil in North America: Issues and Debates in 2003.

== Works ==
- Muhammad Bakhtawar Khan. Mir'at al-‘Alam: History of Emperor Awangzeb ‘Alamgir (Political History), vol. 1. Edited by Sajida S. Alvi. Lahore: Research Society of Pakistan, University of Punjab, 1979.
- Idem.Mir'at al-‘Alam: History of Emperor Awangzeb ‘Alamgir (The Biographies of the ‘ulama', Sufis, Calligraphers and Poets), Vol. II. Lahore: Research Society of Pakistan, University of Punjab, 1979.
- "Muhammad Bakhtawar Khan (d. 1685)," an historian of Mughal emperor Awrangzeb. Encycolopaedia Iranica, New York, 1988, vol. 3, 541–42.
- "The Historians of Awangzeb: A Comparative Study of Three Primary Sources." Essays on Islamic Civilization Presented to Niyazi Berkes, D.P. Little, ed., (Leiden: E. J. Brill, 1976), 57–73.
- "Tarikh-i Husayniyah: An Unknown Source for the History of Awadh." Der Islam Hamburg, West Germany, 58,1(1981): 136–146.
- Advice on the Art of Governance: An Indo-Islamic Mirror for Princes (Mau‘izahi Jahangiri) of Muhammad Baqir Najmi Sani Persian Text with Introduction, Translation, and Notes. Albany: State University of New York Press, 1989.

=== Articles ===
- "Mazhar-i Shahjahani and the Mughal Province of Sind: A Discourse on Political Ethics." Islam and Indian Regions, Texts, Beitrage zur Sudasienforschung Sudasien-Institut Universitat Heidelberg, 145, Anna.L. Dallapiccola and Stephanie Z. Lallemant, eds. Franz Steiner Verlag Stuttgart, 1993. Vol. 1, 239–258.
- "Shi‘ism in India During Jahangir's Reign: Some Reflections." Journal of the Pakistan Historical Society Karachi, Pakistan, 27, 1(1979): 39–65.
- "Religion and State During the Reign of Mughal Emperor Jahangir (1605-27): Nonjuristical Perspectives." Studia Islamica, Paris, France, 69(1989): 95-119.
- "Qazi Sana'-Allah Panipati, An Eighteenth-Century Indian Sufi-‘Alim: A Study of His Writings in Their Sociopolitical Context." Islamic Studies Presented to Charles J. Adams, W. Hallaq and D. Little, eds., (Leiden: E. J. Brill, 1991), 11–25.
- "The Mujaddid and Tajdid Traditions in the Indian Subcontinent: An Historical Overview." Journal of Turkish Studies, 18 (1994): 1-15.
- "Islam in South Asia." The Muslim Almanac: A Reference Work on the History, Faith, Culture, and Peoples of Islam, Azim Nanji, ed. Gale Research Inc., 1995, 55–72.
- "Foreword," Islam: Its Roots and Wings, A Primer, V. S. Behiery and A. M. Guenther. Canadian Council of Muslim Women: 2000, i-ix.
- "The Naqshbandi Mujaddidi Sufi Order’s Ascendancy in Central Asia Through the Eyes of its Masters and Disciples (1010s-1200s/1600s-1800s)". Reason and Inspiration in Islam: Theology, Philosophy and Mysticism in Muslim Thought, essays in Honour of Hermann Landolt, Todd Lawson, ed., (London: I. B. Tauris, 2005), 418–431.
- The Muslim Veil in North America: Issues and Debates, co-edited with Homa Hoodfar and Sheila McDonough. Toronto: Women's Press, 2003.
- “Unpacking the symbolism of the Muslim Veil,” co-authored with Sheila McDonough, Ecumenism (Women of Faith in the World's Religion), No. 115, September (1994).
- “Muslim Women and Society,” (comprises an introduction and editing of two excerpts taken from Fatima Mernissi's The Forgotten Queens of Islam, and Ruth Moore's Ph.D. dissertation, “Women and Warriors@in An Anthology of Islamic Studies, Howard M. Federspiel, ed. (Montreal: Institute of Islamic Studies, 1996), vol. 2, 235-285.
- “Evidence, Inheritance, “Hudud”: Introduction and Comparative Perspective" in the Proceedings, International Conference on Islamic Laws and Women in the Modern World>/cite>,1996. (Islamabad n. d.): 96–97, 129–132, 147–149, 165.
- “Career Development of Women in Indonesian Society: A Study of Highly Successful Career Women,” co-authored with Sabir Alvi, in Women in Indonesian Society: Access, Empowerment, Opportunity: Conference Proceedings, Jakarta, Indonesia. (Yogyakarta: 2002), 111–133.
- “The Canadian Council of Muslim Women: A Chapter in the History of Muslim Women in Canada,” co-authored with Sheila McDonough, The Muslim World, nos. 1&2 (Spring 2002): 79–98.
- “Muslim Women and Islamic Religious Tradition: A Historical Overview and Contemporary Issues,” The Muslim Veil in North America: Issues and Debates, co-edited with Homa Hoodfar and Sheila McDonough, (Toronto, Canadian Scholar's Press, 2003), 145–180.
- “Buzurg Alavi’s Writings from Prison.” The Muslim World. Hartford Seminary Foundation, 67,3(1977): 205 222. Reprinted in Critical Perspectives on the Literature of Iran, Thomas M. Ricks, ed., and compiler (Washington, D. C., Three Continents Press, 1984), 274 291.
- “Urdu Literature from Prison: Some Reflections on the Writings of Pakistani Prisoners of War in India.” Journal of the Research Society of Pakistan. Lahore, Pakistan, 19, 3(1982): 43 54.

=== Pedagogy and Textbooks ===
- Urdu for Children: Book One, Junior and Senior Kindergarten & Grade One, comprising (Two textbooks, Teacher's Manual, Workbook & two Audio cassettes), editor and project director, McGill-Queen's University Press, 1997.
- Urdu for Children: Book Two, Grades Two and Three comprising (Two textbooks), Let's Read Urdu, 2 volumes, Teacher's Manual, Workbooks, 2 volumes & two CDs, editor and project director, McGill-Queen's University Press, 2004.
