= Tarek El Kazzaz =

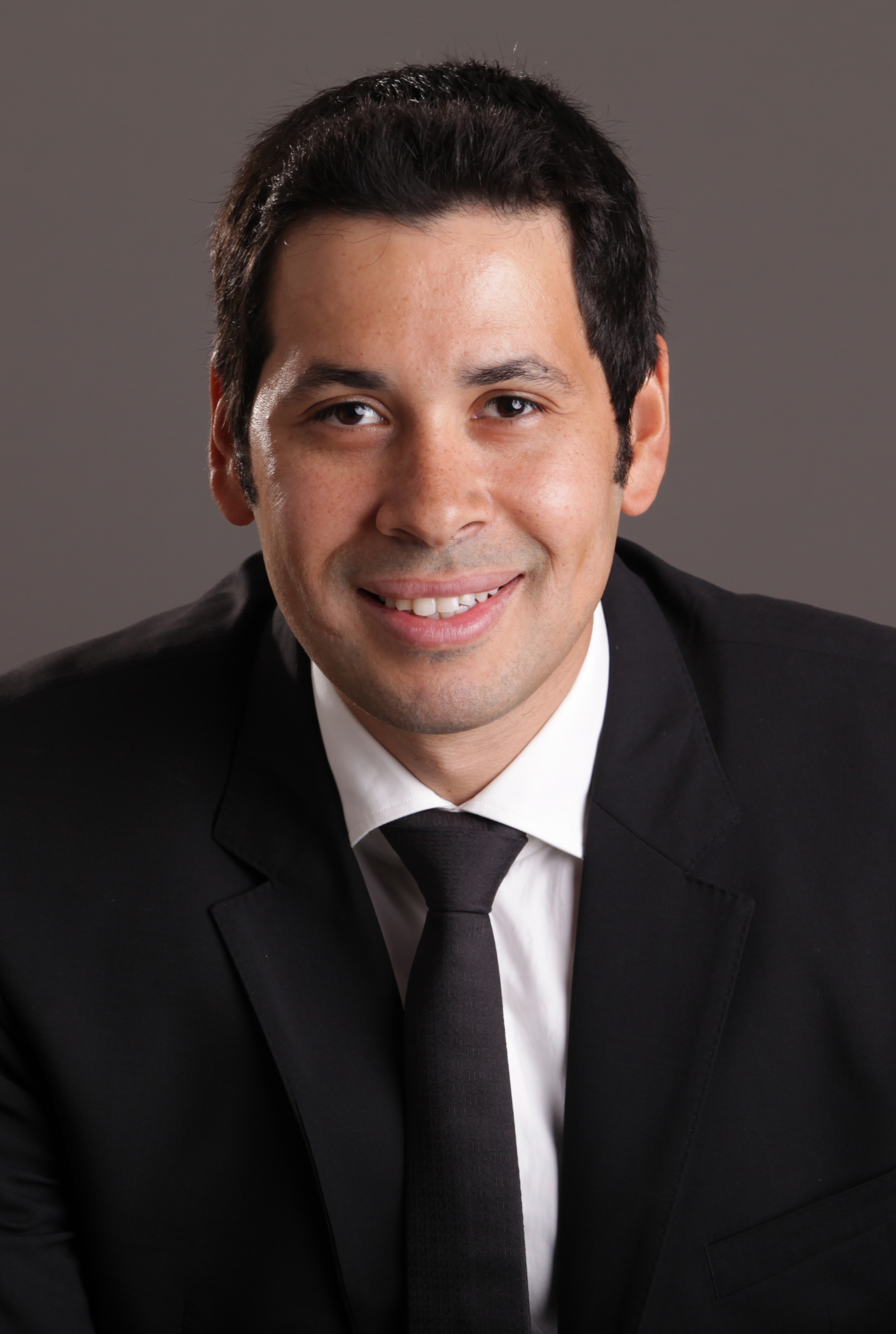
- Tarek ElKazzaz CEO of Qsoft
- Date of Birth: July 23, 1980 (age 45)
- Nationality: Egyptian
- Years Active: 2001-present
- Notable Works: B+Show; Al-Bernameg with Bassem Youssef; Thawra Ala Alnafs; America Belarabi

Tarek El Kazzaz (Arabic: طارق القزاز; born July 23, 1980) is an Egyptian digital entertainment expert who is also the CEO and founder of QSoft Holding, one of the leading new media companies in the Middle East. El Kazzaz is best known for creating and producing Al-Bernameg with Bassem Youssef, the first and top political satire program in the Middle East.

== Career ==
After graduating from the American University in Cairo with a bachelor's degree in construction engineering, El Kazzaz became determined to create a market for online digital entertainment in Egypt. He started working on several self-funded startups in the media production and digital media field. In 2007, El Kazzaz founded Qsoft Ltd., the first company specialized in managing and monetizing online content in Egypt. Within five years, El Kazzaz's leadership had grown the company to become a professional producer of commercial online video and TV content in the Middle East.

In 2017 El Kazzaz was appointed as Head of Multi-Platform Network and Social Media at Middle East Broadcasting Center based in Dubai, heading all MBC's content creation and distribution on social media. He managed a team of 115 people across 4 countries to deliver around 8,000 videos a month, and pushed the MBC social video viewership to average 1 billion views a month, achieving according to Tubular Labs, the number 37 globally in the media and entertainment industry in viewership.

== Discovering Bassem Youssef ==
Late in 2010, El Kazzaz and Youssef created a program discussing the different religious cults around the world. However, the project was never uploaded on YouTube due to the 2011 Alexandria bombings, that took place at the same time of the video production, making the topic too sensitive to address at the time. After the Egyptian Revolution of 2011, El Kazzaz and his carefully selected team of young professionals started executing a strategic plan to produce the number one entertainment show in the Middle East, namely Al-Bernameg with Bassem Youssef. The company started by producing the B+ Show on YouTube. In a few months, the team became the Executive Producers of Al-Bernameg with Bassem Youssef, making the show the first Internet to TV conversion in the Middle East. After leading an ambitious renovation project of Cairo’s glamorous Radio Theatre in 2012, the program became the first show of its kind in the Middle East with a live audience, and recording one of the highest ratings on TV with more than 40 million viewers every week and more than two million subscribers on its YouTube channel.

== Further Projects ==
Being a principal contributor to the success of a number of productions, such as “America Bel ‘Arabi” by Bassem Youssef and “Thawra ‘Ala Al Nafs” by Moez Massoud, El Kazzaz decided to unleash the potential of his team by co-founding “BIG Productions”, a specialized production company. QSoft has now expanded into a holding company, employing more than 250 young professionals, with offices in Cairo, Dubai and Abu Dhabi. El Kazzaz remains CEO, leading the company’s corporate strategy, business growth plans, contract negotiations, new accounts acquisitions, promoting corporate brand and relations, and online campaigns design and management.
