= Dark Phantom =

Dark Phantom is a heavy metal band from Kirkuk, Iraq. It was formed in 2009 by two cousins, Murad Khalid and Rabeen Hasem, in Kirkuk. The band is multi-ethnic, with two Turkmens, two Kurds, and one Arab as members.

== History ==
According to guitar player Khalid, they were introduced to metal by US Army personnel, and were influenced by Metallica. Lyrics address "political and religious corruption", according to singer Mir Shamal, who in an interview said they found it difficult to perform and even rehearse, given the stigma on metal music and the lack of a "thriving metal scene". Another influence was the Iraqi metal band Acrassicauda.

The first drummer left because the band wasn't earning any money, and the band--at the time the only metal band in Kirkuk--played their first show in 2011, before 300 people. This resulted in death threats, including on social media, in a culture where metal is associated with satanism and where Al-Qaeda was in control. The band had recorded an EP in 2012, but their then-singer left for Turkey, afraid of possible violence. The band laid low for a while before starting back up again carefully (around 2014 ISIS was threatening to take over the area). With a new drummer, and Mir Shamal, a Kurdish radio DJ from Sulimaniyah, having joined as a singer, they played shows in a few Iraqi Kurdish cities. They started recording their first album, Nation of Dogs, a protest album: "Our government is like a nation of dogs, they fuck us every day", according to Khalid. By 2016 the band was again underground, recording vocals for their debut album in a bedroom studio in Khalid's mother's house. Nation of Dogs was released in 2016.

By 2020 the band had produced a video for the song "State of War", with great difficulty since (according to Khalid) photographers in Baghdad were afraid to work with them. Mir Shamal also started another band, which by 2015 had become a solo project called Cyaxares. In 2023, Mir Shamal organized a metal festival in Sulaymaniyah, its first ever, where he performed with Cyaxares, as well as three groups from Iraq, Turkey (Ferec), and Iran (Unitique).

== Discography ==
- EP (2012)
- Nation of Dogs (2016)

== Members ==
- Murad (Yaymz) Khalid - rhythm guitar
- Rabeen Hasem - lead guitar
- Sermet Jalal - bass
- Mir Shamal - vocals
- Mahmood Qassem - drums
