= Arageek =

Digital media website

- Website type: Digital media
- Available in: Arabic
- Owners: Emad Shams and Malaz Madani
- Website: www.arageek.com
- Commercial: Yes
- Launched: 2011

AraGeek is an Arabic digital media website, founded in 2011 by two Syrian bloggers: Emad Shams and Malaz Madani while studying in the United Kingdom. Arageek is one of first Arabic online magazine to offer engaging and relevant content focused on technology and social media news to Arab youth.

in 2010, Ibda3world section won "BOBs Award" from the BOB award in 2010, and arageek also nominated for the BOBs in 2015, in 2016 Arageek was the winner of the blogging category at the Arab Social Media Influences Awards in Dubai.

As of January 2018, there is more than 3,000,000 monthly unique visitors that make one of the most visited Arabic language media website, and it had more than 2,500,000 fans on Facebook and close to 200,000 followers on Twitter.

== History ==
Arageek's name is combined (Arabic and geek).

founded in 2011 by two Syrian bloggers Malaz Madani and Emad Shams while living and studying in the United Kingdom. Early iteration of the site was only a simple Wordpress blog with two authors.

in 2017 ِArageek acquired Alam Elebdaa (Ibda3world.com Magazine that founded in 2008 and the winner of BOB award in 2010.

== Awards ==
In 2016 Arageek was the winner of the blogging category at the Arab Social Media Influencers Summit in Dubai. and it was also nominated for the BOBs (weblog award) in 2015.
