= Acrassicauda =

United States-based Iraqi thrash metal band

- Origin: Baghdad, Iraq
- Genres: Heavy metal, groove metal, thrash metal
- Years active: 2001–present
- Labels: Vice Records (2010–2014); Independent (2014–present)
- Members: Faisal Talal Mustafa; Firas Al-Lateef; Marwan Hussein Riyadh; Muhammed Al Ansari
- Past members: Waleed Moudhafar; Tony Aziz Yaqoo; Marwan Grada
- Website: heavymetalinbaghdad.com

Acrassicauda is an Iraqi thrash metal band formed in 2001 in Baghdad and currently based in Brooklyn, New York. It is often credited as the first heavy metal group to emerge from Iraq. The original band consisted of four members and played concerts during the rule of Saddam Hussein. They became well known outside of the local Iraqi metal scene after a Vice magazine profile, and received even greater coverage with a feature-length documentary about the band and its troubles in Iraq called Heavy Metal in Baghdad. Their first extended play was released in 2010, and their debut studio album Gilgamesh was released in 2015.

Because of increased fame after the Iraqi regime change, the band started to receive death threats from Islamic militants. Due to this and the increasing violence in Baghdad the members of the band fled first to Syria and then Turkey before being granted refugee status in the United States of America. Most of the band settled in New Jersey, but Tony Aziz decided to live with family in Michigan, before moving to Richmond, Virginia. The band has since based themselves in Brooklyn.

== History ==
=== Iraq ===
Acrassicauda originally consisted of lead vocalist Waleed Moudhafar, Assyrian guitarist Tony Aziz Yaqoo (also performing professionally as Tony Aziz), bassist Firas Al-Lateef, drummer Marwan Hussein Riyadh (also performing professionally as Marwan Hussein) and vocalist–guitarist Faisal Talal Mustafa (also known professionally as either Faisal Talal or Faisal Mustafa). Moudhafar left the group in 2003, after which Talal assumed the role of lead vocalist.

The band was formed in 2000 after Riyadh and Talal met Aziz in a Baghdad school where they were studying fine arts. The four members worked as journalists and translators before the American invasion. The band name is derived from the Latin name of a species of black scorpion common in Iraq. In Saddam's Iraq, the band was able to get inspiration from various bootleg tapes from heavy metal's 30-year history.

With original lead vocalist Waleed Moudhafar, the band performed under the Saddam regime, but because of censorship restrictions, they had to write a song that praised Saddam Hussein. Called "The Youth of Iraq", the song included the lyrics "Following our leader Saddam Hussein, we'll make them fall, we'll drive them insane!" Other restrictions on the band included the banning of headbanging because of its similarities with the head movement of Orthodox Jews (davening) while praying. In early stages of the American presence in Baghdad Vice magazine (Vice 2004 Vol 11 no1) did a profile on the band which claimed that it was the only heavy metal band in Baghdad. Since that time, other bands have emerged from the Baghdad heavy metal scene.

After the overthrow of Saddam Hussein during the Iraq War, Acrassicauda staged a concert at the Al-Fanar Hotel in the summer of 2005. After stringent security, the concert was able to go on, but several power cuts interrupted the show. The band members practiced in a basement of a store complex until 2006, when the building, basement, and all the band's equipment was destroyed when it was bombed. Due to threats against their lives and increasing violence in Baghdad the band members individually moved to Syria.

=== Syria and Turkey ===
While in Syria, the band was able to hold a concert for metal fans in the basement of a Damascus hotel. Because of Syrian government restrictions, the band was not allowed to call its concert heavy metal and, therefore, used rock music on concert advertising. At the concert, the band performed mostly cover songs because the Syrian audience was not familiar with the Acrassicauda sound. In Syria, the members of the band lived in a small room in an apartment basement with no windows.

During the taping of Heavy Metal in Baghdad in 2007, it was revealed that the Syrian government did not intend to extend the visas of the band. The country had changed its immigration policies, forcing Iraqis to apply in Baghdad instead of the Syrian border. The filmmakers campaigned to raise funds to relocate the band in a safer country rather than having it return to Iraq. The band members also sold their equipment to make the trip and for living expenses. The members of the band fled to Turkey when the visa change took place to apply for refugee status and wait for a third country to accept them.

While on the move, Vice magazine tried to resettle the members in Canada and Germany while also providing money from the Vice corporation. Some $40,000 from Vice sponsors and donations collected online helped out with living expenses of the four band members, according to Suroosh Alvi, one of the founders of Vice and director of the film profiling Acrassicauda. Alvi went on to say, "We had outed them and endangered their lives. They were receiving threats from Iraq while they were in Syria. We had a responsibility." It was with Vice's help that the band was able to use a Syrian recording studio to record three tracks for a demo recording that included "Between the Ashes" and "Massacre". Turkish musicians also lent the band a fully equipped recording studio after hearing of the band's plight while in their country.

=== United States ===
After applying for asylum, the United States government granted the band refugee status, which allows it to apply for green cards after one year. Tony, Faisal, and Firas went first. Tony went to Michigan to handle some family business and started living there. Faisal and Firas settled into their new lives in New Jersey. A humanitarian relief and refugee resettlement agency, International Rescue Committee, placed them in an apartment in the town of Elizabeth. Then, in the early morning hours of January 30, 2009, Marwan arrived. On the band's second day in the United States, they were able to watch Metallica at the Prudential Center in Newark. Each band member met the group backstage and James Hetfield, Metallica's lead singer, presented the band members with one of his guitars, a black ESP, after signing it Welcome to America. The Metallica concert was the band's second-ever stadium concert—the first being the band Testament, which the band saw a few months earlier in Turkey.

The band's first officially released album, Only the Dead See the End of the War, is a four-song EP Released on Vice Records on March 9, 2010. It was produced by Alex Skolnick of Testament at Spin Studio in Astoria, Queens. Acrassicauda followed the release up with a performance with Cannibal Corpse, Voivod, and other metal bands at the Scion Rock Fest in Columbus, Ohio, on March 13.

In July 2011, Acrassicauda embarked on its 2011 "Make it or Break it" inaugural national tour. Guitarist Muhammed Al Ansari joined the band for the tour and continued with the band thereafter. Following the tour, Tony Aziz left the band, "due to family issues", and returned to Virginia. Additional guitarist Marwan Grada joined the band in 2012.

In 2012, the band opened for Ministry, with lead vocalist Al Jourgensen stating that Acrassicauda was his favorite band.

In 2013, the band's "We're Not Gonna Stop" tour commenced.

In mid-2014, Acrassicauda recorded their first studio album, Gilgamesh, in New York City. The band raised the money to produce the album through a Kickstarter campaign, raising US$37,383. On April 4. 2015, Acrassicauda released their first full studio album.

== Documentary ==
The story of the band was the subject of a documentary called Heavy Metal in Baghdad, which was made by Canadians Eddy Moretti and Suroosh Alvi. The film was shot over three years. It began as a series of webisodes for VBS, Vice's online network. Taping locations included Baghdad and Erbil in Iraq; Beirut, Lebanon; and Damascus, Syria. Originally, it was not intended to be a feature-length movie, but a cut was accepted for the 2007 Toronto International Film Festival. Its premiere was in September, and it was again shown at the Berlin International Film Festival the following February. The film was screened at additional international film festivals throughout 2008. It was released on DVD after a brief theatrical run in New York and Los Angeles.

The film was well received with The New York Times praising the film as "An intrepid, unlikely and altogether splendid feat of D.I.Y. reportage...both a stirring testament to the plight of cultural expression in Baghdad and a striking report on the refugee scene in Syria, this rock-doc like no other electrifies its genre and redefines headbanging as an act of hard-core courage."

An hour-long cut-down version of the film was shown in the UK in December 2008 as part of the documentary series Imagine. They were also featured briefly in the 2004 documentary Voices of Iraq.

Members of the group have insisted that its focus is on the music and have expressed concern over some of the media attention received. Al Lateef told the Montreal Mirror that it wanted to play as an "Iraqi heavy metal group, not as a refugee heavy metal group." He followed that with "all we care about is the music and playing heavy metal, and this is why we're still living, because it's the only way that we get our feelings out—by music."

== Style and influences ==
The group was inspired by bands such as Metallica, Slayer, Iron Maiden, Rage Against the Machine, and Slipknot. Heavy Metal in Baghdad shows the band playing covers ranging from Europe's "The Final Countdown" to Metallica's "Fade to Black". The first time members of the group saw a Western band live was a 2008 Testament concert in Turkey. Alex Skolnick of Testament described Acrassicauda's music as "very heavy" and "raw".

According to Vice magazine, the conditions in Baghdad after the American invasion resulted in the band's music becoming "even more hate-filled and intense and fucked than ever before." The band's music deals with war and suffering at times, but the songs are meant to be apolitical.

The name Acrassicauda, originally A. Crassicauda, is derived from the scorpion species Androctonus crassicauda (conventionally abbreviated A. crassicauda and also known as the fattail scorpion) of the family Buthidae, which lives in the Iraq desert and is considered very dangerous. The band said about this choice of name:

Only a certain part of the Iraqi body is bad. The rest is good – just like the scorpion.

— Walid Mudhafar in the Toronto Star

== Band members ==
Current members

- Marwan Hussein (born c. 1984) – drums, lyricist (2001–present)
- Faisal Talal Mustafa (born c. 1983) – lead vocals (2001–present), rhythm guitar (2001–2011)
- Firas Al-Lateef (born c. 1981) – bass (2001–present)
- Muhammed "Moe" Al Ansari – guitar (2011–present)

Former members

- Waleed Moudhafar – lead vocals (2001–2003)
- Tony Aziz Yaqoo (born c. 1979) – lead guitar (2001–2011)
- Marwan (Mar2) Grada (born 1987) – lead guitar (2012–2014)

== Discography ==
=== Studio albums ===
- Gilgamesh (2015)

=== EPs ===
- Only the Dead See the End of the War (2010)

=== Singles ===
- Flowers in the Desert (2009)
- Garden of Stones Promo Single (2009)

=== Demos ===
- Black Scorpion Demo (2004)
- Damascus Demo (2006)
- KEXP Demo (2011)

== Filmography ==
- Heavy Metal in Baghdad (2007)

== See also ==
- Dark Phantom, metal band from Iraqi Kurdistan
