= Dave Chappelle: The Kennedy Center Mark Twain Prize for American Humor =

- Genre: variety special
- Directed by: Chris Robinson
- Starring: Dave Chappelle; Aziz Ansari; Neal Brennan; Michael Che; Bradley Cooper; Morgan Freeman; Tiffany Haddish; Colin Jost; Lorne Michaels; Eddie Murphy; Jon Stewart; Sarah Silverman
- Country of origin: United States
- Original language: English

Production
- Producers: Michael B. Matuza; Chris Robinson; Matthew Winer
- Editors: Jon Alloway; Steven Bognar; Chester Contaoi; Brian Forbes; Brad Gilson; Pi Ware
- Running time: 90 minutes

Original release
- Network: PBS / Netflix
- Release: October 27, 2019

Dave Chappelle: The Kennedy Center Mark Twain Prize for American Humor was a ceremony presented on October 27, 2019. The show honored comedian Dave Chappelle who was being awarded with the Mark Twain Prize for American Humor which was presented at the John F. Kennedy Center for the Performing Arts in Washington D.C. Those who helped celebrate his accomplishments included Neal Brennan, Jon Stewart, Lorne Michaels, Aziz Ansari, Sarah Silverman, Bradley Cooper, and Morgan Freeman.

The event was filmed and shown on PBS as well as the streaming service Netflix in 2020. The broadcast of the ceremony was unique, because footage of the ceremony was interspersed with footage of Chappelle performing standup in various comedy clubs. The special earned two Primetime Emmy Award nominations for Outstanding Variety Special and Outstanding Picture Editing for Variety Programming.

== History ==
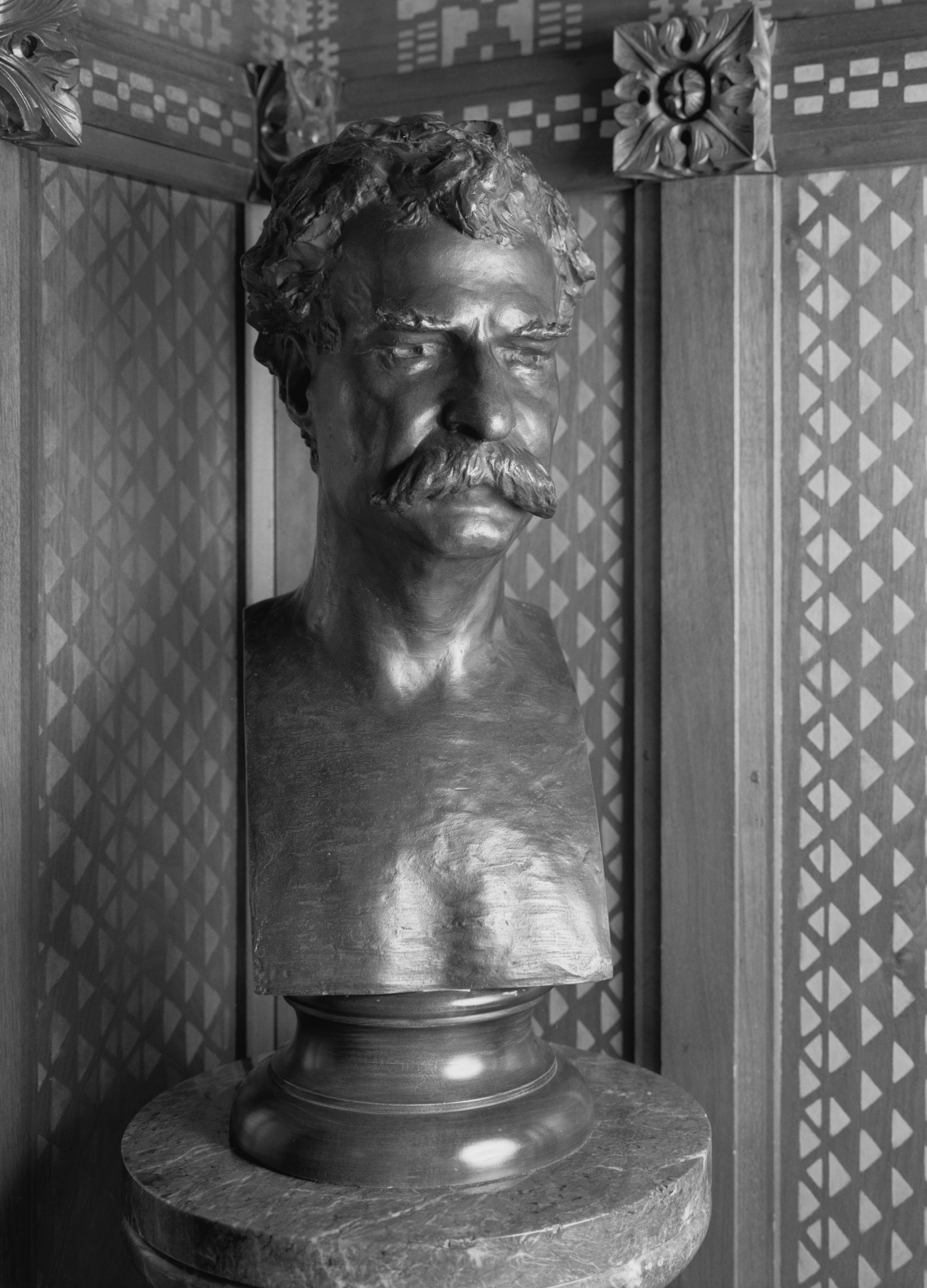
the bust of the Mark Twain Prize for American Humor

The ceremony was dedicated to the 22nd recipient of the Mark Twain Prize for American Humor, Dave Chappelle. The first recipient of this award was given to Richard Pryor in 1998 and has since been awarded to numerous comedians such as Bob Newhart, Carl Reiner, Billy Crystal, Steve Martin, Tina Fey, Carol Burnett, Bill Murray, Jon Stewart, and Julia Louis-Dreyfus. The prize remains the highest honor a comedian can receive.

Chappelle was the fourth black performer to receive this award followed by Pryor, Whoopi Goldberg, Bill Cosby, and Eddie Murphy. Since Chappelle's win, Kevin Hart became the fifth black performer to win the award. Although Cosby received the award in 2005, it was rescinded in 2018 due to his sexual assault conviction.

The award, named after the 19th-century humorist Mark Twain who famously wrote American classics such as The Adventures of Tom Sawyer (1876), and The Adventures of Huckleberry Finn (1884). The award is presented to individuals who have "had an impact on American society in ways similar to" Twain. The award was presented at the John F. Kennedy Center for the Performing Arts in Washington, D.C., where it has been presented annually since 1998.

== Production ==
It was filmed at the John F. Kennedy Center for the Performing Arts in Washington D.C. by Netflix for the first time for the Mark Twain Prize. The special is filmed more in the style of a documentary rather than a traditional awards ceremony. There are clips of his previous work and interviews along with moments from the event.

Chappelle is known for his biting political satire and social commentary in both his standup and his groundbreaking Comedy Central sketch series Chappelle's Show (2003–2006). Numerous friends and collaborators came to honor Chappelle including Jon Stewart, Neal Brennan, Aziz Ansari, Lorne Michaels, Colin Jost, Michael Che, Kenan Thompson, and Eddie Murphy. In the special, there is a pre-taped segment in which Chappelle goes to the Duke Ellington School of the Arts and donates his Primetime Emmy Award to the school.

== Ceremony ==
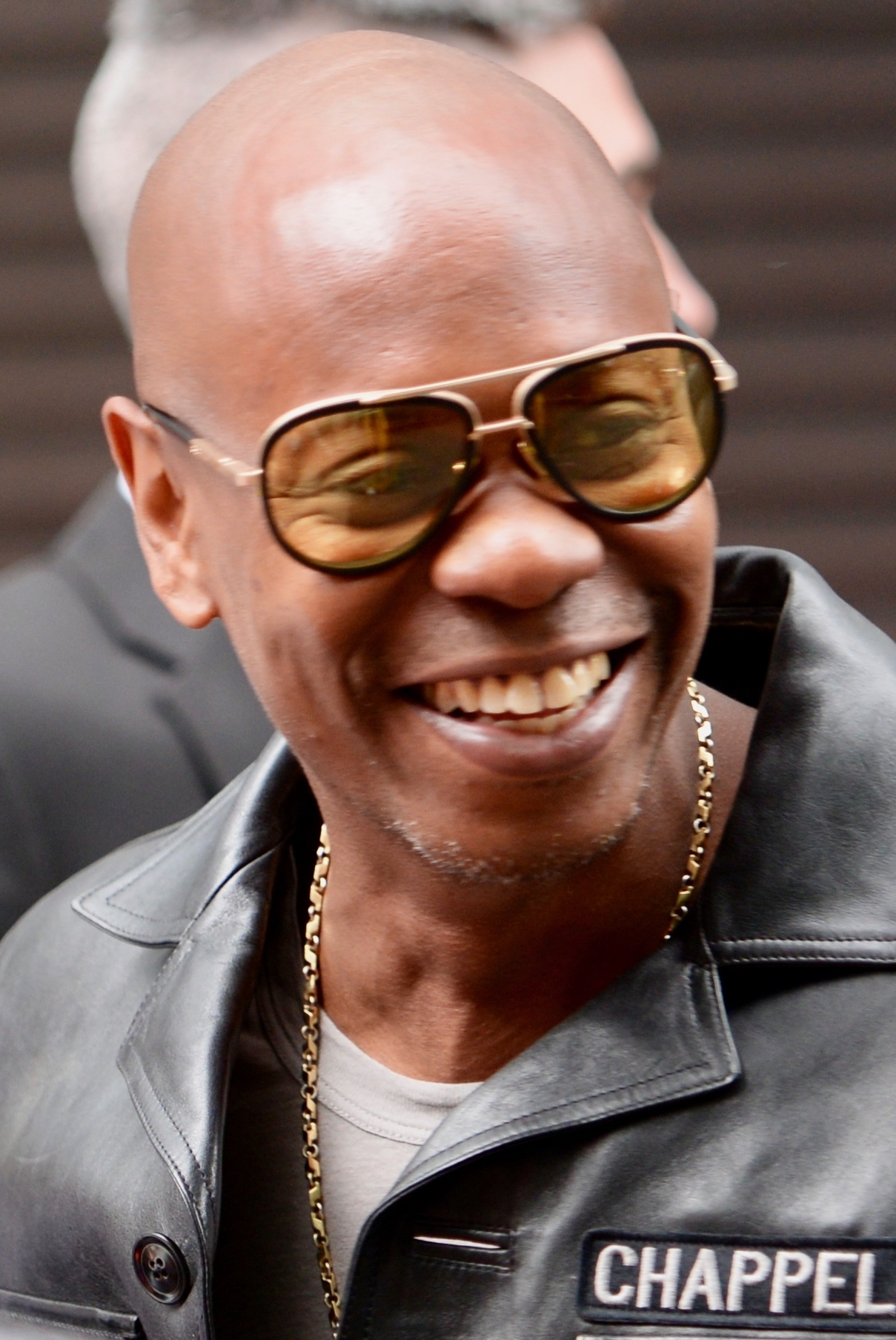
Dave Chappelle in 2018

=== Performers ===
Performer	Notes
Morgan Freeman	Freeman opens the show and served as the announcer for the evening.
Tiffany Haddish	Shared a story about bowling with Chappelle and Marlon Wayans late one night.
Aziz Ansari	Told a comedic story about sharing mushrooms with Chappelle after performing together.
John Legend	Talked about Chappelle's unique voice in American politics.
Neal Brennan	Brennan, co-creator of Chappelle's Show, shared personal memories he had had with Chappelle.
Sarah Silverman	Talked about starting out together in comedy clubs in New York City.
Jon Stewart	Stewart shared stories of them working for Comedy Central.
Bradley Cooper	Talked about acting opposite him in A Star is Born and going with him to The White House.
Lorne Michaels	Spoke about Chappelles's daring and unique political voice.
Colin Jost, Michael Che and Kenan Thompson	They talked about the influence Chappelle's Show had on sketch comedy.

=== Pre-taped ===
- Eddie Murphy

=== Musical guests ===
- The Duke Ellington Band
- Yasiin Bey
- Common
- Erykah Badu
- Q-Tip
- Frederic Yonnet

=== In the audience ===
- Michelle Wolf
- Chrissy Teigen
- Jeff Ross
- Sasheer Zamata
- Chris Tucker
- George Lopez
- Donnell Rawlings

== Reception ==
The New York Times critic Noah Weiland praised the show and Chappelle describing him as "subversive and charming" adding the special "testified to how far-reaching Mr. Chappelle’s influence has been by drawing a range of celebrities". He also noted "The ceremony did little to explain the breaking point in Mr. Chappelle’s career and life...there was often at least a decade-long gap between jokes or scenes, highlighting his older, more challenging, more thrilling skit-based humor against his more recent and uneventful stand-up comedy."

Jen Chaney of Vulture also praised the special writing, "Most of the evening was devoted to fun, occasionally even heartwarming stories about Chappelle and the crazy, unexpected, memorable things that happen when you spend even a few minutes in his orbit." USA Today gave a mixed review to the special declaring, "Chappelle’s punchlines don’t hit without controversy," specifically pointing out his defense of Louis C.K., downplaying of the allegations against Michael Jackson, and his comments regarding the Trans community.

== Release ==
The program was broadcast on PBS stations on Tuesday, January 7, 2020. It was also released on Netflix later in 2020.

== Awards and nominations ==
Year	Award	Category	Nominated work	Result	Ref.
2020	Primetime Emmy Awards	Outstanding Variety Special	Rick Austin, Dalton Delan, David Jammy, Deborah F. Rutter, Kristen Wong, Chris Convy, Chris Robinson, Michael B. Matuza, Matthew Winer	Nominated	
2020	Primetime Emmy Awards	Outstanding Picture Editing for Variety Programming	Brad Gilson, Chester G Contaoi, Jon Alloway, Pi Ware, Brian Forbes	Nominated	
