= Al Bernameg =

Egyptian news satire show (2011–2014)

- البرنامج
- Genre: News satire
- Created by: Bassem Youssef; Tarek El Kazzaz
- Written by: Bassem Youssef; Khalid Mansour; Ayman Wattar; Shadi Alfons; Mohamed Andil; Hesham Mansour (season 1); Mostafa Helmy (season 1)
- Directed by: Mohamed Khalifa
- Starring: Bassem Youssef
- Theme music composer: Mostafa El Halawany
- Country of origin: Egypt
- Original language: Arabic
- No. of seasons: 3
- No. of episodes: 144

Production
- Executive producers: Bassem Youssef; Tarek El Kazzaz
- Production locations: Cairo, ONTV studio (2011–2012); Cairo, Radio Theatre (2012–2014)
- Running time: Varies (about 60mins)
- Production companies: Qsoft Group (2011–2013); EgyTheaters; BIG Production (2014)

Original release
- Network: ONTV (2011–2012); Capital Broadcasting Center (2012–2013); MBC Masr (2014)
- Release: 2011 – April 18, 2014

Al-Bernameg (Arabic: البرنامج, known in Egypt as El Bernameg, pronunciation: [elberˈnæːmeɡ], literally "The Show") was a controversial Egyptian news satire program. The show was hosted by Bassem Youssef and was broadcast on the satellite channels CBC, founded by GIS-affiliated businessman Mohamed El-Amin and OnTV Egypt owned by the United Media Services (UMS), a company owned by the Egyptian General Intelligence Service (Mukhabarat) since 2016. Later moved to Saudi-owned on the free-to-air channel MBC Masr and reruns are aired on Deutsche Welle; Bassem Youssef announced on 2 June 2014 that the show was cancelled.

Its satirical style, willing to poke fun at powerful personages across the political spectrum, has led the press to compare it with The Daily Show hosted by Jon Stewart, which was the inspiration for the show. Bassem Youssef visited The Daily Show as a guest in June 2012 and April 2013, while Stewart, on hiatus from his own hosting duties, returned the favour on 25 October 2013. On 1 November 2013, the show was pulled from CBC over differences with the broadcaster. The suspension of the show raised questions about media freedom in Egypt following the 2013 Egyptian coup d'état. In early 2014, MBC MASR picked up the show, airing its first episode on 7 February 2014.

== The B+ Show ==
Following the 18-day-protests of the Jan 25th revolution, The B+ Show was created by Tarek El Kazzaz and Bassem Youssef, as a political satire show commenting on the events and how the mainstream media presented them. Together they teamed up with Amr Ismail as Producer and Mohamed Khalifa as Director of a 5-minute episode for online viewing.

The B+ Show was named after Youssef's blood type; B+, and was shot entirely in Youssef's laundry room with one table, one chair, one camera and a banner with amateur images of Tahrir Square.

For every five-minute episode, Youssef and his team used to watch up to ten hours of videos for research to help them write the script.

Uploaded for the first time in May 2011, The B+ Show gained more than five million views in the first three months alone, on its YouTube Channel.

Nine webisodes later, Egyptian channel ONTV offered Youssef to create a political satire TV show Al-Bernameg, literally translating to "the show".

== Al-Bernameg Season 1 ==
The show's move to Egyptian channel ONTV made it one of the first internet to TV conversion in the Middle East.

The show premiered in Ramadan 2011, and became the platform for many writers, artists, and politicians to speak freely about the social and political scene.

Season one of Al-Bernameg aired a total of 104; 30-min episodes and was produced by Qsoft Ltd.

== Al-Bernameg Season 2 ==
Despite the great success of Al-Bernameg on ONTV, the team always aspired to be the first live-audience TV show of its genre in the Middle East. Having that vision in mind, Ahmed Abbas, the Chief Operations Officer of Qsoft and Al-Bernameg’s Project Director, started working on taking this idea further to create a multifaceted brand for Al-Bernameg. In the summer of 2012, the team successfully reached a deal with Capital Broadcast Network (CBC) to air the new season of the show with the new format, moving it from ONTV's studios to the majestic building of Radio Cinema and Theatre, which is an exact replica of Radio City Music Hall in New York, accommodating 220 guests in total for every episode. Al-Bernameg, which aired its premiere in November 2012, was the first to have a live audience in the Middle East and recorded one of the highest viewership ratings on both TV and Internet; with a combined viewership of around 120 million on YouTube alone.

Radio Theatre, which is owned by Al-Ismailia for Real Estate Investment, underwent a massive renovation process to transform it into a live audience studio for the show while maintaining the aesthetics of the architecture and the interiors of the historical building. Under the leadership of the same Executive Producer, Amr Ismail, the team hired the production designer, Christopher George, and the lighting director, Mark Kenyon, of The X-Factor UK to design the new set of Al-Bernameg.

The second season of Al-Bernameg consisted of 29 episodes. The show gained tremendous success through its humorous yet bold criticism of former Egyptian President Mohamed Morsi, representing the Muslim Brotherhood.

The show's format evolved to include three segments, starting with Youssef's usual witty and humorous observations on current events, sketches performed by the team, and ending with guests from the entire political spectrum, music bands and artistic talents.

As Al-Bernameg continued with its growing success, Jon Stewart appeared as a guest on the show in June 2013, marking one of the all-time highlights of Al-Bernameg episodes. Other celebrity guests such as Amr Waked, in addition to a large number of Egypt's and the region's most popular music bands and performers, appeared on the show. Al-Bernameg also enjoyed diversity in its audience every week, including public figures such as Hamdeen Sabahi, Yosri Fouda, Elissa, Assala Nasri, Ziad Rahbani and Angham.

Soon after the show started airing, complaints were filed against it and its host, with accusations of insulting Islam, President Morsi and disrupting public order and peace. However, Al-Bernameg’s team sustained its critical tone, risking the future of the show and holding on to the right of freedom of expression.

Season two of Al-Bernameg aired a total of 29 60-min episodes.

== Al-Bernameg Season 3 ==
In October 2013, CBC suspended the airing of Al-Bernameg season 2, claiming that “the show has not been abiding by the editorial policy of the network.” In February 2014, Al-Bernameg returned with its third season, on MBC Masr satellite channel with a second re-run on Deutsche Welle (DW). The show achieved unprecedented viewership ratings every week.

Season three of Al-Bernameg aired 11 60-min episodes.

In March 2014, Nilesat announced that it was investigating jamming of broadcasts of Al-Bernameg, credit for which had been claimed by an organisation known as the Egyptian Cyber Army.

In April 2014, MBC announced that they would suspend broadcasting of the show until the end of May “to avoid influencing Egyptian voters’ opinion and public opinion” in the run-up to the 2014 Egyptian presidential election.

In June 2014, Youssef announced the termination of Al-Bernameg where he said that the pressure on him, his family, and MBC had become too great.

== Criticism ==
During its run and the period leading up to the 2013 Egyptian military coup, El Bernameg, became a focal point for political satire and controversy. The show was seen to have played a prominent role in inciting and laying the ground for the Egyptian 2013 military coup against the country's first democratically elected government and supporting its aftermath crack down, killing of protesters and massacres. El Bernameg endorsed the media clampdown that followed, which included the arrests of several media personnel, despite these actions being carried out by the military without due process.

The program notably celebrated the coup and its aftermath with a satirical song-and-dance number set to the tune of 'Old MacDonald'. The performance trivialized the army’s brutal and violent suppression of sit-ins and opposition to the coup, framing the Morsi government and the Muslim Brotherhood as threat of 'terrorism' to the 'Egyptian people'. Additionally, anyone who opposed the coup was often labeled as 'non-Egyptian,' further deepening the polarization and marginalization of dissenting voices. This portrayal came after a year-long campaign on the show that many viewed as contributing to the demonization and dehumanization of the Muslim Brotherhood. The aftermath of the coup saw widespread violence, including the killing of civilians and arbitrary arrests and torture. The show has consistently referred to the military coup as a "revolution", a framing that aligned with the perspective of the coup's leaders and helped legitimize it.

Another contentious aspect of the show's coverage was its alleged role in dehumanizing and vilifying opponents of the coup and engaging in victim-blaming rhetoric. The program vilified regular Egyptians who supported the Morsi government, characterizing them as lesser citizens or internal enemies. The program supported anti-democratic, anti-liberal movement to exclude Islamists from public life, and ultimately to overthrow and replace the Morsi government with a military government. The program distributed petitions to the live audience during the show, calling for the overthrow of the democratically elected government.

The show was also involved in spreading conspiracy theories, including claims that Qatar was 'buying' Egypt and that the Morsi government was 'selling' the Pyramids, Suez Canal and parts of the country. This narrative was prominently featured in a satirical song on El Bernameg, which mocked Qatar’s alleged influence and its perceived economic hold over Egypt.

Additionally, El Bernameg usually engaged in quote mining and association fallacy which helped lay the groundwork for supporting the military's actions, including the subsequent crackdown on dissent and the violence that followed, such as the Rabaa massacre, the biggest in modern Egyptian history.

== See also ==
- List of Egyptian television series
