= Mary Beth Tinker =

American free speech activist

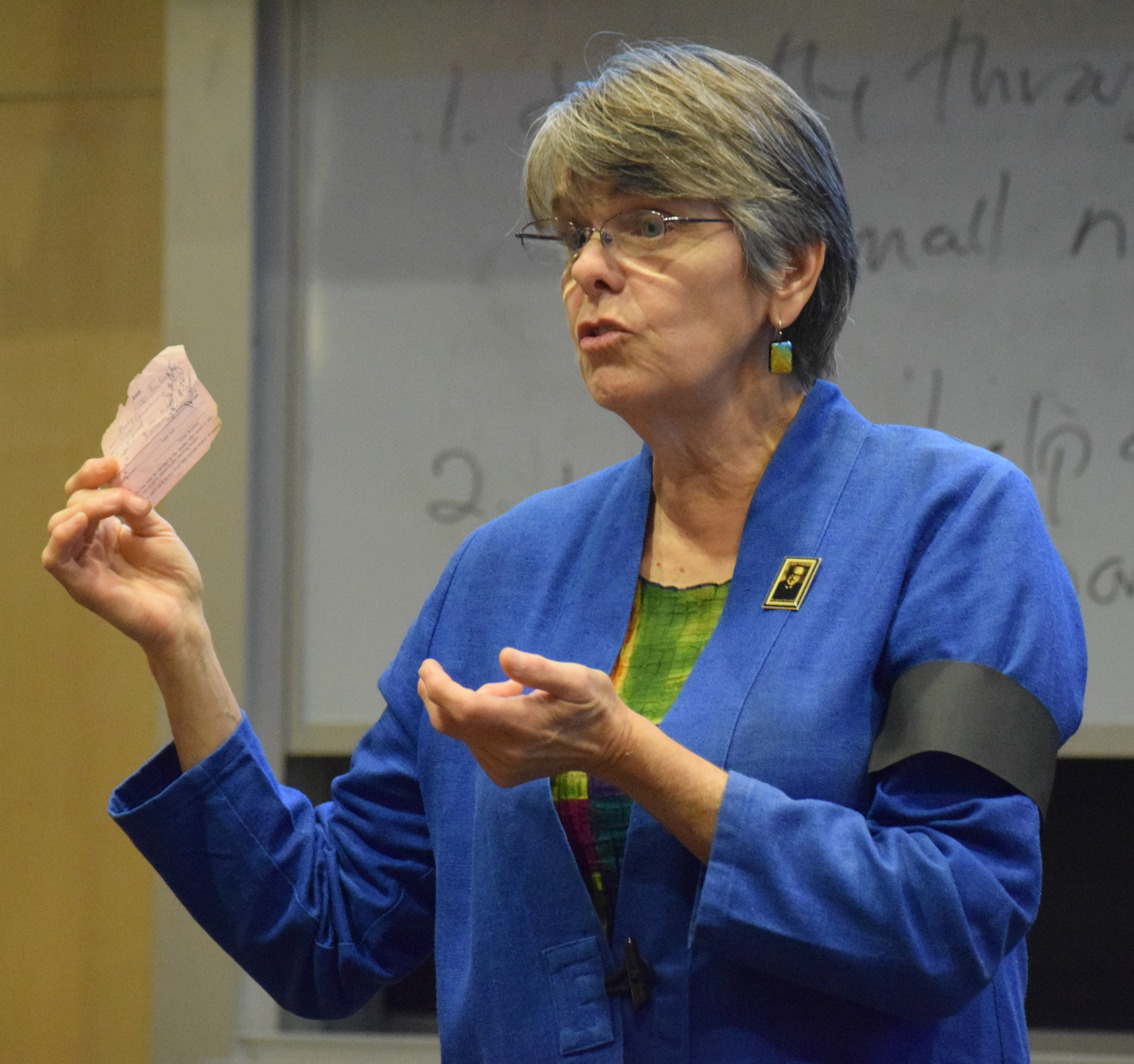
- Mary Beth Tinker holding her original detention slip while wearing a replica of her black armband at Ithaca College in 2017
- Born: 1952 (age 73–74); Des Moines, Iowa
- Known for: Participating in free speech
- Relatives: Bonnie Tinker

Mary Beth Tinker is an American free speech activist known for her role in the 1969 Tinker v. Des Moines Independent Community School District Supreme Court case, which ruled that Warren Harding Junior High School could not punish her for wearing a black armband in school in support of a truce in the Vietnam War. The case set a precedent for student speech in schools.

== Early life ==
Mary Beth Tinker was born in 1952 and grew up in Des Moines, Iowa, where her father was a Methodist minister. Her family also became involved with the Religious Society of Friends (Quakers).

== Tinker v. Des Moines Independent School District ==
Mary and her brother John showing the black armbands which led to their suspension

When Tinker was 13, she wore a black armband to school in protest of the United States' involvement in Vietnam as a member of a group of students who decided to do this.

On December 11, 1965, a student named Christopher Eckhardt held a meeting with a large group of students at his home in Des Moines, Iowa. Planning a school protest against the Vietnam War, the group decided to wear black armbands in school on December 16. They chose to keep wearing them until January 1, 1966. During a meeting for Des Moines School District principals on December 14, 1965, a policy was adopted that required all students wearing armbands in school to remove them. In this meeting, principals agreed that students were to be suspended if they disagreed.

Thirteen-year-old Mary Beth Tinker was a student at Warren Harding Junior High who was among two dozen elementary, middle, and high school students that wore black arm bands to school on December 16 and 17. The school singled out five students for punishment, including Mary Beth and her brother John.

Tinker reported that immediately after she and her brother were suspended, her family received many threats from the public. "A man who had a radio talk show threatened my father on the air. Red paint was thrown on our house. A woman called on the phone, asked for me by name, and then said, 'I'm going to kill you!'"

Tinker shared her thoughts on this in an interview: "We had examples in our life of people who really sacrifice and the Birmingham kids, four of them were killed for speaking up against racial segregation. I felt like getting suspended was really not a very bad thing to happen, compared to that."

On December 21, 200 people attended the district school board meeting. Deciding to postpone a decision, at a January 3 meeting, the school board voted 5-2 to uphold the principals' ban. On March 14, the Iowa Civil Liberties Union filed a formal complaint on behalf of Christopher Eckhardt, John Tinker, his sister Mary Beth, and their fathers in the U. S. District Court of the Southern District of Iowa. The case claimed that by suspending them, Des Moines Public Schools had infringed on their right to free expression as enshrined in First Amendment. The District Court dismissed the complaint and upheld the constitutionality of the school's actions on the basis that the students disturbed learning in their schools.

After that, the judges for the U.S. Court of Appeals for the 8th Circuit were split, leaving the District Court ruling in place. The case reached the Supreme Court on November 12, 1968. On February 24, 1969, the Supreme Court found that by suspending Tinker and her peers for wearing the armbands, Des Moines School District violated the students' First Amendment rights. Justice Abe Fortas famously wrote in his opinion that students did not “shed their constitutional rights to freedom of speech or expression at the schoolhouse gate.” In Tinker v. Des Moines School District the Supreme Court ruling set the legal standard for student free expression for many years.

== Impact ==
Tinker vs. Des Moines served as a platform for many other cases dealing with the Freedom of Speech in public schools. Citing this case became known as the "Tinker Test". Tinker's case served as a precedent for many other cases and influenced countless schools' policies on expression.

This is seen in a case where a Georgia school unconstitutionally suspended student Amari Ewing, who walked out of school in protest of gun violence. The usual punishment for such an offense was a one-day, in-school suspension. Ewing was suspended for five days.

Another time is seen when Madison Oster, who walked out of her Illinois school in support of gun rights in March of 2018, sued her school district for censoring her free speech. Oster alleges the school "selectively bann[ed] her viewpoint" by initially insisting she and her fellow gun supporters stage their protest near the school's front door, far from where the crowd of anti-gun violence protesters demonstrated on the football field, and keeping them "out of everyone else's sight or hearing."

== Present ==
Today, Tinker conducts speaking tours across the United States to teach children and youth about their rights. A youth rights advocate, Tinker has a professional background as a pediatric nurse who is active in union activism and holds master's degrees in both public health and nursing.

According to the San Francisco Chronicle, in fall 2013, Tinker began a national tour promoting youth activism and youth rights with student rights attorney Mike Hiestand known as the "Tinker Tour". During the fall of 2013, the pair traveled 15,595 miles (25,098 km) across the American east coast, midwest, and southeast, speaking to more than 20,000 students and teachers at 58 stops, including schools, colleges, churches, a youth detention facility, courts, and several national conventions. The tour was scheduled to visit schools and events in the American west, midwest, and southwest during the spring of 2014.

== Honors ==
In 2000, an annual youth advocacy award of the Marshall-Brennan Project at Washington College of Law at American University honored Tinker by naming the award after her. In 2006, the ACLU National Board of Directors' Youth Affairs Committee renamed its annual youth affairs award the Mary Beth Tinker Youth Involvement Award.

== See also ==
- History of Youth Rights in the United States
