= Bassem Youssef =

Egyptian-American comedian and surgeon (born 1974)

- باسم يوسف
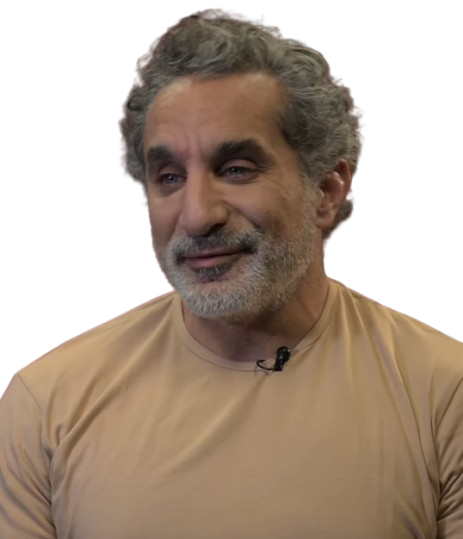
- Youssef in 2024
- Born: 21 March 1974 (age 52); Cairo, Egypt
- Citizenship: Egypt; United States
- Education: Cairo University (MD)
- Occupations: Comedian; television host; surgeon
- Years active: 2011–present
- Notable work: Revolution for Dummies: Laughing Through the Arab Spring (2017)
- Style: Satire; stand-up comedy
- Television: El Bernameg; The B+ Show
- Spouse: Hala Diab (m. 2010)
- Children: 2

Bassem Youssef (Arabic: باسم يوسف; born 21 March 1974) is an Egyptian-American comedian, television host, actor, political commentator, and former cardiothoracic surgeon. He rose to international prominence for hosting the satirical news program Al Bernameg (2011–2014), which emerged following the 2011 Egyptian revolution. Youssef faced significant legal and political pressure in Egypt owing to his style of political satire, leading him to flee the country in late 2014 and relocate to the United States.

In the U.S., Youssef has maintained his media career, including hosting the 43rd International Emmy Awards in 2015. In 2017 he was profiled in the documentary Tickling Giants and published his memoir, Revolution for Dummies. Beginning in late 2023, he drew renewed global media attention for his outspoken, pro-Palestinian advocacy during the Gaza war, frequently engaging in high-profile media debates on the Israeli–Palestinian conflict.

== Early life and education ==
Bassem Youssef was born on 21 March 1974 in Cairo, Egypt. Bassem Youssef's origins trace back to El Mahalla El Kubra, in Gharbia Governorate, which is located in the Delta region of Egypt. He graduated from Cairo University Faculty of Medicine. Then he completed his residency in cardiothoracic surgery.

In 1998, Youssef passed the United States Medical Licensing Examination (USMLE), he is also a Member of the Royal College of Surgeons (MRCS). He also received training in cardiac and lung transplantation in Germany, after which he spent a year and a half in the United States working for a company that produces medical equipment related to cardiothoracic surgery.

== Medical career ==
Youssef practiced as a cardiothoracic surgeon in Egypt for 13 years before moving into comedy and political satire. In January 2011, Youssef assisted the wounded in Tahrir Square during the Egyptian revolution. Youssef credited surgery for making him "a much harder working person, a nerd, a perfectionist".

== Media career ==
=== 2011–2014: Breakthrough in Egypt ===
==== The B+ Show (2011) ====
Inspired by the 2011 Egyptian revolution, Youssef created his first satirical show in March 2011. The initial idea came from his friend Tarek El Kazzaz. Entitled The B+ Show after his blood type, the program, at 5 minutes per episode, was uploaded to his YouTube channel in May 2011 and gained more than five million views in the first three months alone. The show was shot in Youssef's laundry room using a table, a chair, one camera, and a mural of amateur photos from Tahrir Square that cost $100. The show was a collaboration by Youssef with Tarek El Kazzaz, Amr Ismail, Mohamed Khalifa, and Mostafa Al-Halawany. Youssef used social media to showcase his talent and his show gave a voice to the millions of Egyptians who were seething with anger from the traditional media's coverage of the Egyptian Revolution.

==== Al Bernameg (2011–2014) ====
After the success of The B+ Show, Egyptian channel ONTV, owned by Egyptian billionaire Naguib Sawiris, offered Youssef a deal for Al Bernameg (literally,The Program) a news satire show. Youssef had planned to move to Cleveland to practice medicine, but instead signed his show's contract. With a budget of roughly half a million dollars, the series made him the first Internet-to-TV conversion in the Middle East. The show, which consisted of 104 episodes, premiered during Ramadan 1432 (2011) with Egyptian-American engineer Muhammad Radwan as its first guest. In his show, Youssef parodied such Egyptian celebrities as show host Tawfik Okasha, composer Amr Mostafa, Salafist presidential candidate Hazem Salah Abu Ismail, and Mohamed ElBaradei, former head of the International Atomic Energy Agency and onetime presidential candidate. The show became the platform for many writers, artists, and politicians to speak freely about the social and political scene. Al-Bernameg's success inspired a number of amateur initiatives on various social media channels, who credit The B+ Show as their inspiration. In June 2012, Jon Stewart invited Youssef to The Daily Show for an extended interview, "I do know a little something about the humour business; your show is sharp, you're really good on it, it's smart, it's well executed, I think the world of what you're doing down there", Stewart said to Youssef.

Tarek ElKazzaz convinced an old friend, Ahmed Abbas, to join QSoft as chief operations officer and Project Director for Al Bernameg. The show was renewed for a second season after a contract with a second channel, CBC, which premiered on 23 November 2012. The second season consisted of 29 episodes and recorded one of the highest viewership ratings on both TV and internet with 40 million viewers on TV and more than 184 million combined views for his show on YouTube alone. The program, which began with a small group working at home with Youssef, moved from ONTV's smallest studio to Radio Theater in Cairo's downtown, a theater redesigned in the likeness of New York's Radio City, making it the first live audience show in Egypt. The contents of a typical broadcast evolved from a sarcastic take on current political events into hosting of public figures and stars from various fields, as well as various artists' performances. Following the move, Youssef succeeded in increasing the show's worth by eight times in one year. The show gained tremendous success through its criticism of former Egyptian President Mohamed Morsi, representing the Muslim Brotherhood.

On the season's premiere, Youssef made the owner and coworkers of his channel the subject of his show, as an assurance that he is granted full freedom of expression, and that no topic was off limits. CBC did not, however, air his second episode, which also featured further criticism of a TV show host who filed a lawsuit against Youssef. The show returned to its regular schedule for the third episode. Just three episodes into the show, several lawsuits were filed against Youssef and his show, accusing him of insulting Islam, Morsi and disrupting public order and peace. In March 2013, Youssef started writing a weekly column expressing his views for Al-Shorouk; one of Egypt's most prominent and independent daily newspapers. Youssef also wrote newspaper columns, where he tackled taboo subjects such as atheism and questioning the commonly held view that apostasy from Islam should be punishable by death. On 18 March 2014, he faced plagiarism accusations when he submitted an article to Al-Shorouk, an Egyptian newspaper. Entitled ‘Why Putin does not care,’ the piece was a comment on the events unfolding in Russia. Although it was written in Arabic, sharp-eyed Twitter users spotted striking similarities to a piece called ‘Why Russia No Longer Fears the West,’ by British writer Ben Judah, who wrote the article for Politico magazine. He later published an apology in Al-Shorouk newspaper for initially publishing an article without citing any references.

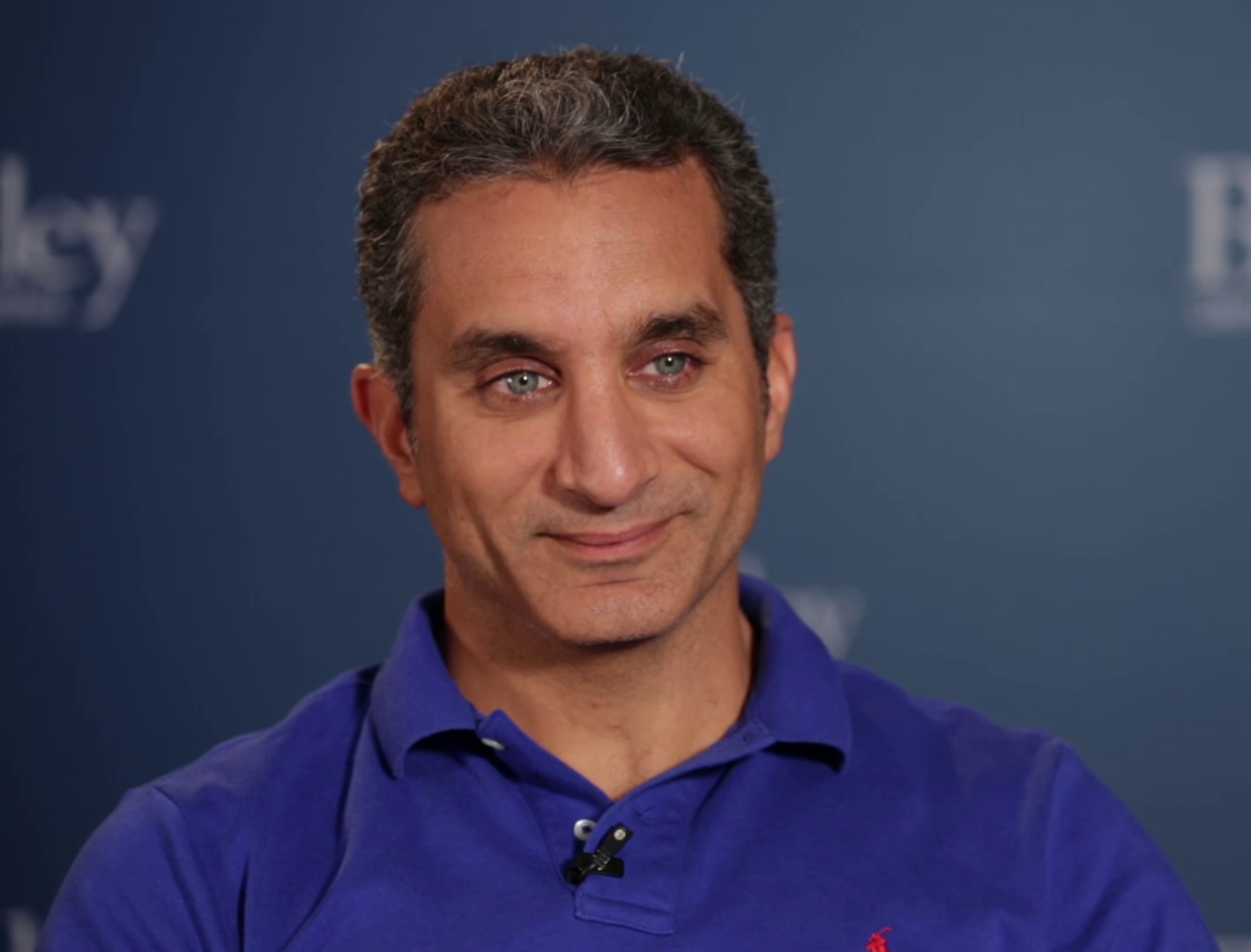
Youssef at the University of California in 2014

As Al Bernameg continued with its growing success, Jon Stewart appeared as a guest on the show in June 2013. On 1 July 2013 America in Arabic (United Arab Emirates) debuted. He appeared for the second time on The Daily Show. After a four-month break, Al Bernameg returned to air on CBC for its third series on 25 October 2013. The season premiere marked the first broadcast for the show since the 2013 Egyptian coup d'état had deposed Mohamed Morsi from the Egyptian presidency. Youssef criticized both the Morsi administration and the people's idolization of the Egyptian Defense Minister Abdul Fatah al-Sisi. The following day the CBC network issued a statement distancing the channel from the political stance taken by Youssef. The CBC network issued another statement, and decided to stop broadcasting Al Bernameg because of violations in the contract signed. Meanwhile, more than 30 complaints against Youssef and the show were filed at the General Prosecutor's office, accusing him of insulting the Egyptian Armed Forces and President Adly Mansour and describing the 30 June protests as a military coup, in addition to disrupting public order and peace. The General Prosecutor transferred some of the complaints for investigation, which were subject to the prosecutor's decision and judgment.

After terminating the contract with CBC, the production company behind Al Bernameg received offers from different TV channels. The third season was scheduled to air during the first quarter of 2014. In February 2014 it was announced that Youssef had signed a deal with the Middle East Broadcasting Center and that they would start broadcasting Al Bernameg from 7 February on MBC MASR satellite channel. Al-Bernameg achieved unprecedented weekly viewership ratings for 11 consecutive weeks. On one of the shows, Youssef mocked the Egyptian military's claims to be able to cure hepatitis C and AIDS. In June 2014, after a six-week break during the 2014 Egyptian presidential election campaign, the Al-Bernameg team held a press conference where Youssef announced the termination of the show due to pressure on both the show and the airing channel. He felt that the political climate in Egypt was too dangerous to continue the show.

==== Arrest and investigation (2013) ====
On 1 January 2013, the daily newspaper Al-Masry Al-Youm reported that an Egyptian prosecutor was investigating Youssef on charges of maligning President Mohammed Morsi, whose office claimed that Youssef's show was "circulating false news likely to disturb public peace and public security and affect the administration." Despite all of the controversy it sparked, Al Bernameg was a major success. It constantly topped the regional YouTube charts, making Youssef's YouTube channel the most subscribed to in Egypt.

On 30 March 2013, an arrest warrant was issued for Youssef for allegedly insulting Islam and Morsi. The move was seen by opponents as part of an effort to silence dissent against Morsi's government. Youssef confirmed the arrest warrant on his Twitter account and said he would hand himself in to the prosecutor's office, jokingly adding, "Unless they kindly send a police van today and save me the transportation hassle." The following day, he was questioned by authorities before being released on bail of 15,000 Egyptian pounds. The event sparked international media attention as well as a segment on Jon Stewart's The Daily Show in which he declared his support for Youssef, calling him a "friend" and "brother".

==== Coup d'état (2013) ====
Youssef had been a consistent supporter of the 2013 Egyptian coup d'état and was supportive of the media clampdown which included the arrests of several employees of various stations, despite it being carried out by the military with no due process, and celebrated the coup's aftermath in a song and dance number sung to the tune of Old MacDonald.

Youssef backed the forcible removal of Morsi, declaring himself "very glad" with the putsch. As news reports were trickling in that dozens of Muslim Brotherhood supporters had been shot dead by security forces, he tweeted that the entire incident amounted to nothing more than "blood for publicity" and blamed the organization itself for its supporters being murdered.

Youssef was widely recognized for his bold criticism of the Morsi government; however, his approach also extended to labeling many of his opponents as being "Muslim Brotherhood", regardless of their actual affiliations. According to Vox, "The Youssef who we do not typically see in the United States is the satirist who didn't just challenge the Muslim Brotherhood government — but who went a step further, vilifying the regular Egyptians who supported the Islamist government, characterizing them as lesser citizens or internal enemies in a way that played into Egypt's hate-filled political polarization, Sisi's coup, and the disastrous consequences of both. Indeed, Youssef cheered on the military coup — as well as the bloodshed of anti-coup protesters, because unlike him they were Islamists".

Youssef's support for the military coup and his criticism of anti-coup protesters were evident in his public statements and social media activity. For instance, on 5 July 2013, he tweeted, "MB leadership sending its youths to die at army HQs to victimize themselves against the world. Blood for publicity. Cheap. #not_a_coup." This tweet has since been deleted. Following the killing of over 50 protestors in front of the Republican Guard HQ on the morning of 7 July, Youssef made no comment other than "Kifaya" (enough) in response to the incident.

Youssef characterized the MB as "the new form of Nazis," a statement he made both on his show and on social media.

==== Emigration from Egypt (2014) ====
After Al Bernameg ended, the Egyptian police under the El-Sisi regime raided the offices of the production company, arresting several employees and confiscating their computers. According to Youssef, the police told producer Amr Ismail that they would continue harassing the company if Youssef did not stop speaking publicly at international conferences. The Egyptian courts then levied a E£50 million fine against Youssef in a contract dispute with CBC. In the verdict, the courts condemned satirical television shows and implied that Youssef was disrupting the peace and inciting public unrest. Fearing he would be arrested if he stayed in Egypt, Youssef fled to Dubai on 11 November 2014.

In March 2018, the Court of Cassation canceled the ruling against Bassem requiring him to pay 100 million pounds in compensation in favor of the Egypt Channel Group.

=== 2015–present: Career in the United States ===
In January 2015, Harvard's Institute of Politics (IOP), at the John F. Kennedy School of Government, announced that Youssef would be a resident fellow for the spring semester. In February 2015, it was announced that Youssef was collaborating with The Daily Show producer Sara Taksler to launch a crowdfunding campaign for her documentary about his experience, Tickling Giants. Youssef stated that he couldn't say no to her request to do the documentary as, "at the time, she was working at The Daily Show, and I didn't want to say no to anybody working with Jon Stewart. So I basically said 'yes' to be on his good side, but I discovered it didn't really make any difference".

In April 2015, Youssef spoke at Women In The World conference held in New York City.

In November 2015, Youssef hosted the 43rd International Emmy Awards in New York City. In the fall of 2016, Youssef was a visiting scholar at Stanford University's Center on Democracy, Development and the Rule of Law (CDDRL). His research interests were stated as "political satire and its role in disrupting political, social and religious taboos."

In February 2016, it was announced that Youssef had reached a deal with Fusion to produce a digital series, Democracy Handbook with Bassem Youssef. The show premiered online and in a one-hour broadcast special in mid-July 2016. Tickling Giants, a documentary film about Youssef directed by Sara Taksler, premiered on 14 April 2016, at the Tribeca Film Festival. John Oliver and Ed Helms were moderators for Q&As at screenings in Los Angeles.

In February 2024, Youssef said that he had been offered a role in the film Superman but that his role was subsequently cut. He said he was told there was a script change. According to Salon.com, the timing of the change coincided with others in Hollywood being fired for pro-Palestinian comments. Director James Gunn and studio sources said that the character had been removed from the script before Youssef had criticized Israel's actions in Gaza.

On 19 April 2024, it was announced that Youssef would join Mehdi Hasan's new media company, Zeteo, as co-host for their new podcast We're Not Kidding.

== Advocacy during the Gaza war ==
In October 2023, Youssef signed the Artists4Ceasefire open letter, urging President Joe Biden to push for a ceasefire and an end to the Gaza war. On 17 October 2023, Youssef drew international media attention after engaging in a virtual interview on Piers Morgan Uncensored, in which he spoke—often satirically—about the October 7 attacks on Israel and the ensuing Gaza war, as well as the broader Israeli–Palestinian conflict. He also drew comparisons with the ongoing Russian invasion of Ukraine and criticized the Israeli military's tactics in the Gaza Strip, questioning how the Western world would perceive Israel's response to the attack if it was being conducted by Russian troops. The video garnered 17 million views by 22 October, becoming the channel's most viewed video. On 1 November 2023, Youssef was brought back onto the show for an in-person interview after Piers Morgan visited him in Los Angeles for a more serious discussion, with Youssef mostly refraining from satire and debating with Morgan on antisemitism and the historic Arab–Israeli conflict.

Following these interviews, Youssef appeared on various international news and media platforms to continue his commentary on the conflict and his critique of Western policy. Regarding the 2024 Presidential Election, Youssef stated in the interview that he did not care about former President Donald Trump winning but did not want President Biden to win re-election. In his words, "All we asked him (Biden) for was a ceasefire. Stop the killing. Stop the killing."

In September 2025, Youssef signed an open pledge with Film Workers for Palestine pledging not to work with Israeli film institutions "that are implicated in genocide and apartheid against the Palestinian people."

During the war, Youssef's commentary has drawn accusations of antisemitism, which he has called laughable. In a January 2026 appearance on Candace Owens's podcast, he described the September 11 attacks as "the biggest false flag operation" and attributed several other attacks to Mossad. The Board of Deputies of British Jews, the Community Security Trust and the Jewish Leadership Council criticized his booking for a June 2026 show at London's Royal Albert Hall.

== Filmography ==
=== Film ===
Year	Title	Role	Notes	Ref.
2017	Tickling Giants	Himself	Documentary feature	
2022	Under the Roses	Actor	Short film	
2023	Upsidedown	Actor	Short film	

=== Television ===
Year	Title	Role	Notes	Ref.
2011	The B+ Show	Himself / Host	YouTube satirical program	
2012-2014	Al Bernameg	Himself / Host	Also creator; 3 seasons	
2016	Democracy Handbook	Himself / Host	Also creator; webseries	
2017	Duck Tales	Sabaf / Toth-Ra	Voice; Episode: "The Living Mummies of Toth-Ra!"	
2018	Apple and Onion	Kobeba / Kofta	Voice; Episode: "Falafel's Fun Day"	
2018	Dropout	Himself	Comedy Sucks (with Bassem Youssef)	
2020	Ask Bassem	Himself / Host	Also writer; 3 episodes	
2021	The Problem with Jon Stewart	Himself	Episode: "The Problem with Freedom"	
2022	Mo	Abood Rahman	2 episodes	
2022	Ramy	Gamal	Episode: "Limoges"	
2022	The Mark Twain Prize for American Humor: Jon Stewart	Himself	Television special	
2023	Special Ops: Lioness	Amrohi	Episode: "Gone is the Illusion of Order"	
2023	Upload	Miro Mansour	4 episodes	
2024	Arabs Got Talent	Judge		

== Accolades and influence ==
In 2013, Youssef was named one of the "100 most influential people in the world" by Time magazine and one of Foreign Policy magazine's 100 Leading Global Thinkers. In November 2013, Youssef's role in the media was recognized by the committee to Protect Journalists, which awarded him with the International Press Freedom Award, along with three other journalists.

In 2015, Youssef received an honorary degree and delivered the commencement address for the College of Online & Continuing Education at Southern New Hampshire University. Al Bernameg was chosen by South by Southwest, one of the largest international interactive festivals, as the first and most successful internet to TV conversion story in the Middle East. Al Bernameg's YouTube channel was the first channel in the MENA region to reach one million subscribers and was awarded the gold button trophy.

Youssef's comedic style has led to him being dubbed "Egypt's Jon Stewart" after Stewart's satirical The Daily Show, which had itself inspired Youssef to pursue a career in television. On 2 May 2024, Bassem Youssef was awarded the ″Gold Medal for Outstanding Contribution to Public Discourse″, College Historical Society, Trinity College Dublin. In his talk he spoke about advocacy for Palestine and the Israel–Gaza war, being arrested for jokes, and the crackdown on free expression.

== Personal life ==
In 2010, Youssef married Hala Diab, with whom he has two children. Diab is half Egyptian and half Palestinian; her Palestinian family is originally from Ramla and was displaced to the occupied Gaza Strip during the 1948 Arab–Israeli War.

Youssef has refused to return to Egypt while it is under the rule of Abdel Fattah el-Sisi, and became a naturalized American citizen in 2019. Youssef is Muslim.

== Published works ==
- Youssef, Bassem (2017). Revolution for Dummies: Laughing Through the Arab Spring. HarperCollins. ISBN 9780062446916
- Youssef, Bassem; Daly, Catherine R. (2021). The Magical Reality of Nadia. Scholastic Inc. ISBN 9781338572285
- Youssef, Bassem; Daly, Catherine R. (2021). Middle School Mischief (The Magical Reality of Nadia #2). Scholastic Inc. ISBN 9781338572292

== See also ==
- Television in Egypt
