= Frankie MacDonald =

Amateur weatherman

- Born: April 24, 1984 (age 42); Sydney, Nova Scotia, Canada
- Known for: Internet weather forecasts

Frankie MacDonald (born April 24, 1984) is a Canadian amateur meteorologist from the Whitney Pier area of Sydney, Nova Scotia. MacDonald, who has autism, is known for his boisterous online weather forecasts. Frankie records meteorologist reports which he then posts to his YouTube channel, under the handle of dogsandwolves.

MacDonald's videos have received more than 57 million views. He also maintains a Twitter account and blog. Weather reports MacDonald has produced include warnings for his home province of Nova Scotia, a snowstorm in Winnipeg, heavy rainfall in Vancouver, a storm in Minnesota, New York, Australia, and Bermuda during Hurricane Gonzalo of 2014.

MacDonald is also a regular on comedian Chrissie Mayr's podcast The Wet Spot on Compound Media, albeit virtually rather than in person; his regular weather updates provide a humorous contrast to the normally sex-oriented subject material discussed on the show.

== Videos ==
"People of Toronto, be prepared! Order your pizzas and order your Chinese food and five cases of pop because it's going to be a terrible snowstorm to hit Toronto, Ontario... have your iPads and your iPhones charged just in case the power goes out... do your grocery shopping right now. Don't wait for the last minute. Do it right now!"

— A sample of a forecast by Frankie MacDonald.

MacDonald has published over 3,800 videos on YouTube. These videos are primarily weather forecasts; however, he also posts videos on competitive eating and how to properly shovel snow.

As a child, MacDonald wanted to be a weather forecaster. He made his first scenery video on December 27, 2007. On December 16, 2009, he made his first YouTube video. MacDonald gained recognition in Canada for his posts to the Weather Network's website.

His forecast predicting a Vancouver earthquake was featured on the program Tosh.0, and BuzzFeed called his Hurricane Isaac forecast, "the only forecast you need for Hurricane Isaac."

MacDonald's videos have turned him into an "internet weather-broadcasting sensation", with several hundreds of thousands of views for some videos; his Minnesota forecast video reached over 150,000 views. His forecasts have been picked up by media throughout the world, and he has given weather forecasts for the Nova radio network in Australia. MacDonald has presented the weather on the CBC and has been featured in an online video series for Nova Scotia Power.

In February 2017, MacDonald received a silver YouTube Play Button to commemorate the achievement of 100,000 subscribers to his YouTube channel.

== Reaction ==
MacDonald was included in CBC News's "Top 10 Newsmaking Stories of 2013 in Nova Scotia." Additionally, MacDonald was awarded the Vital Cape Breton Excellence Award which honours Cape Breton islanders who have made significant contributions in the community. He was also recognized for his work by Member of Parliament Mark Eyking in the House of Commons on February 4, 2015, during the Statements by Members session. MacDonald has had his likeness made into a bobblehead and had his "be prepared" catchphrase featured on clothing.

The videos have received both positive (including people thanking him for weather warnings) and negative feedback on YouTube; MacDonald tries to "ignore" the latter, insisting they are "rude and disrespectful." The hosts of The Roz & Mocha Show on Toronto's Kiss 92.5 have been accused of being disrespectful when interviewing MacDonald, but they deny this, claiming they are fans of MacDonald. In 2013, false rumours of his death circulated online.

== Book ==
A book authored by and featuring MacDonald was published by Nimbus Publishing Limited of Halifax, Nova Scotia on 15 June 2018. The book is titled Be Prepared: The Frankie MacDonald Guide to Life, the Weather, and Everything (ISBN 9781771085755) and lists both Frankie MacDonald and Sarah Sawler as authors, with Sawler also credited as contributor. It is intended for a juvenile to teen audience. The book is in part a biography, and covers a range of subjects including science & nature, earth sciences, autism, and weather. During the process Sawler consulted with Autism Nova Scotia and with MacDonald and his family to ensure she got everything right and presented it fairly.

== Parody ==
On January 30, 2015, the Halifax daily newspaper The Chronicle Herald published an editorial cartoon by their staff cartoonist Bruce MacKinnon, which featured Frankie MacDonald giving a forecast of the "Massive Boondoggle" of the overbudget reconstruction of the schooner Bluenose II.

On September 14, 2019, The Chronicle Herald again featured Frankie in another editorial cartoon by Bruce MacKinnon. The cartoon featured Frankie MacDonald giving a 'Be Prepared' warning for hurricane preparation that included the advice that construction sites lower their cranes, related to a recent incident in Halifax where a construction crane collapsed during Hurricane Dorian.

== Discography ==
=== Guest appearances ===
- Rectus Abdominus - Rectus Abdominus vs. The World - spoken word on "Weather Report" (2019)
- Rectus Abdominus - Poop Factory Chronicles Chapter 1: The Emoji Album - spoken word on "Breaking News With Frankie MacDonald" (2023)
