= Bill Schulz (television personality) =

American television personality

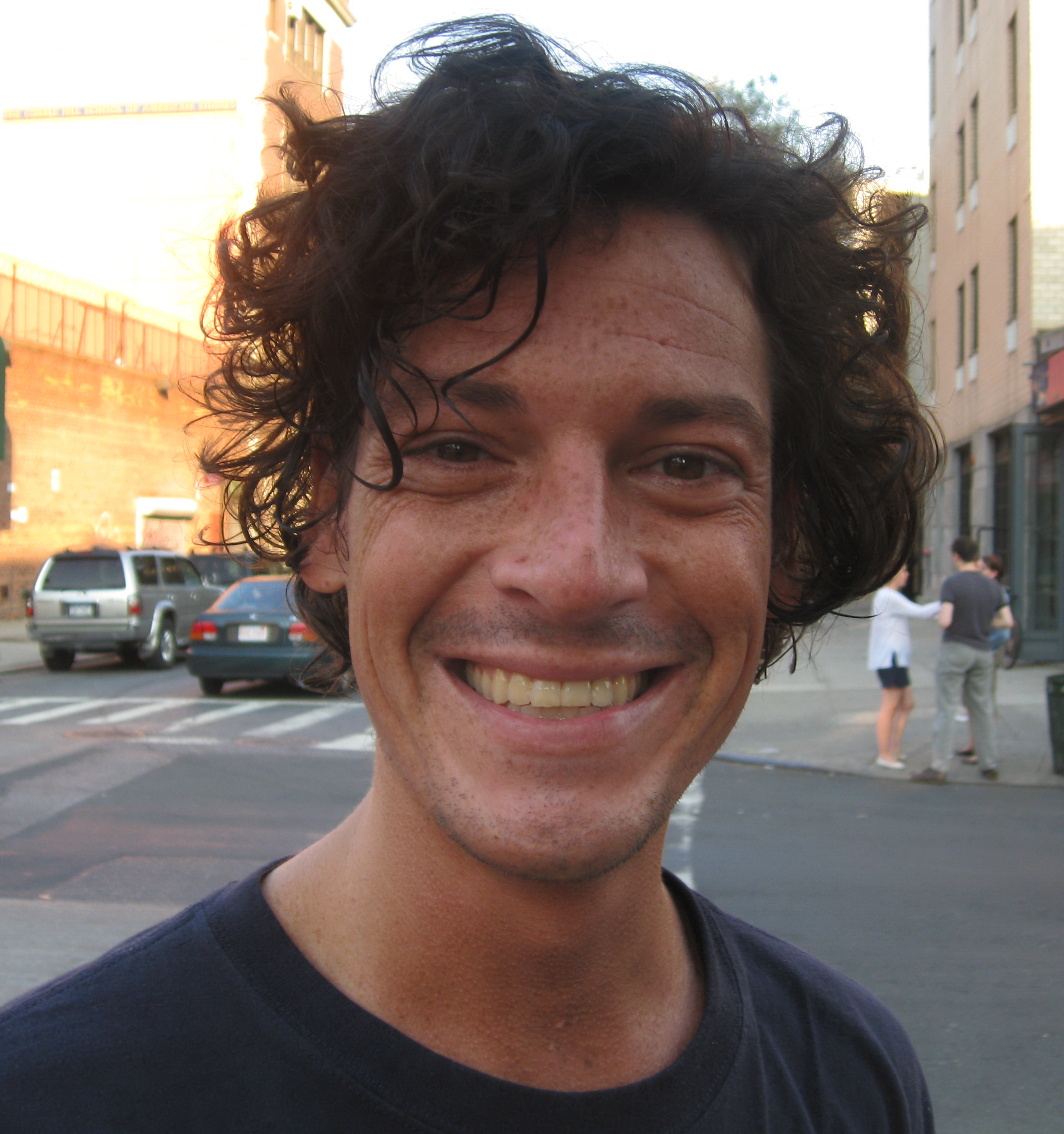
- Born: William Dawes Schulz; August 14, 1975 (age 49); Lake Forest, Illinois
- Occupation(s): Journalist, writer, television personality, YouTuber
- Years active: 2007-present
- Known for: Red Eye w/ Greg Gutfield

William Dawes Schulz (born August 14, 1975) is an American journalist, writer, and television personality. He is co-host of Mornin'!!! w/ Bill & Joanne, and is a freelance writer and a former senior editor of Stuff Magazine. He is best known for being on the Fox News late-night show Red Eye w/ Greg Gutfield.

== Early life ==
Schulz was born William Dawes Schulz in Lake Forest, Illinois. He has two brothers, Alfred and Jonathan, and was raised Catholic. He is a descendant of William Dawes, who rode with Paul Revere in the "Midnight Ride" during the American Revolution. He attended high school in Illinois at Lake Forest Academy, and in 1998 received a BA in Print Journalism from Emerson College.

== Career ==
=== Red Eye ===
From its debut in 2007 until November 2013, Schulz was a regular panelist, writer, and producer on "Red Eye with Greg Gutfeld". Serving as host Greg Gutfeld's "repulsive sidekick" who was routinely the target of Gutfeld's running gags, Schulz often looked directly into the camera (even when he was not being talked to) with his signature "crazy-eyed look," along with frequently waving to the television viewing audience. Schulz provided the voice for an anthropomorphism of The New York Times newspaper, named "Pinch" (a reference to publisher Arthur Ochs Sulzberger Jr.).

Schulz's final appearance on Red Eye was on November 7, 2013, and his departure was officially announced on November 22.

=== Mornin'!!! w/ Bill & Joanne ===
On October 2, 2017, Schulz and former Red Eye cohort Joanne Goodhart (née Nosuchinsky) launched Mornin'!!! w/ Bill Schulz and Joanne Nosuchinsky on Anthony Cumia's Compound Media entertainment network. In April 2024, Compound Media merged with Gavin McInnes' Censored.TV network, resulting in Compound Media laying off their staff, seeing Schulz and Goodhart moving their show to YouTube, and shortening the name of their show to Mornin'!!! w/ Bill & Joanne.

=== Other ventures ===
Schulz works as a freelance writer. His articles have appeared in Maxim, The Daily Beast, and The New York Times.
