= Mandy Stadtmiller =

American journalist

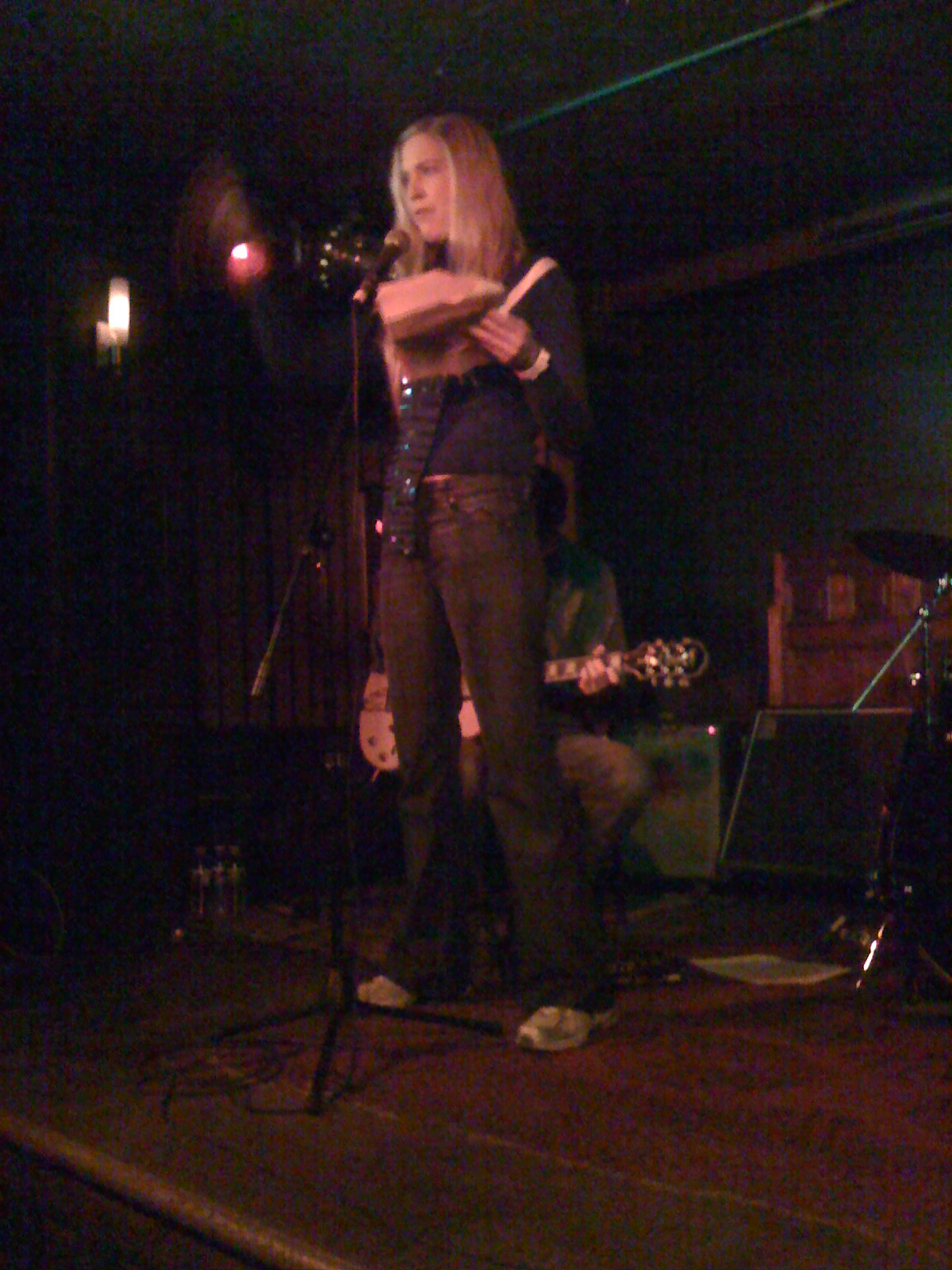
- Stadtmiller at the March 19, 2009 Liam McEneaney's Writings with Music in Union Hall, Brooklyn, New York
- Born: October 24, 1975 (age 50); San Diego, California, U.S.
- Occupations: Journalist, comedian
- Notable work: "Unwifeable: A Memoir"
- Spouse: Pat Dixon (m. 2015; div. 2021)
- Website: http://mandystadtmiller.com/

Mandy Stadtmiller (born October 24, 1975) is an author and columnist for New York magazine, former editor-at-large of xoJane, "Girl Talk" columnist for Penthouse and host of the comedy podcast "News Whore." She is also known for her dating column in the New York Post, called "About Last Night."

Her TV appearances include Inside Amy Schumer, Nightline, 20/20, The Insider, Dr. Drew On Call, Jane Velez-Mitchell, Uncommon Sense with Charlamagne Tha God, Good Day New York, Red Eye, Katie, The Artie Lange Show, The Joy Behar Show, Howard Stern TV, Fuse TV and VH1.

She has also written for The Washington Post, The Los Angeles Times, Mashable, Maxim, Time Out, The Village Voice, The Fort Lauderdale Sun-Sentinel, The Des Moines Register, Playgirl and Match.com.

She is a contributor to HuffPost Live.

Stadtmiller wrote about inspiring the Nina Howard character (played by Hope Davis) in The Newsroom after briefly dating Aaron Sorkin and showed their correspondence about the development of the "Bad Mandy" character in xoJane.

== Early life ==
Stadtmiller was born in San Diego in 1975 to Patricia and Jerry Stadtmiller, a Marine and Vietnam veteran. In a 2018 interview, Stadtmiller stated that multiple bullet wounds to the face received during combat in Vietnam left her father completely blind and suffering anger management issues related to an acquired brain injury.

She attended The University of San Diego High School in California. In 1997, she received a bachelor's degree in journalism from Northwestern University.

== Career ==
In August 2006, Stadtmiller was groped and bitten by actor/comedian Andy Dick during an interview following his appearance on the Comedy Central Roast of William Shatner. Dick said that Stadtmiller "slanted" the incident.

In 2006, Stadtmiller won first place in New York's Funniest Reporter Show contest in the New York City Underground Comedy Festival. In October 2007, she became a semi-finalist in the search for New York's Funniest Stand-Up a contest run by the New York Comedy Festival. She performs stand-up comedy throughout New York City at various clubs and venues.

According to her Twitter account, in February 2012, Stadtmiller quit the New York Post. She is a frequent contributor to the gossip pages of Page Six.

Stadtmiller was Editor-at-Large of Jane Pratt's site xoJane. In September 2015, she wrote about continuing to have this role at the site but going freelance in a controversial piece called "How I Became a First-Person Human Trafficker" for New York. For her work at xoJane, Stadtmiller was profiled twice in The New York Observer, as well as on Flavorwire and The Rumpus.

In 2014, she was named as one of the 25 "most shameless people on the Web" at SXSW, where she was featured on a panel with Jane Pratt, Kristina Wong and Issa Rae for "Fearlessly Funny: The Women Changing Digital Humor."

Largely known for her social media presence, Stadtmiller was the first verified Twitter user from the New York Post, and frequently writes about using social media for networking, including how to boost one's Klout score.

Stadtmiller currently hosts a podcast on the RiotCast Network called News Whore. News Whore debuted at #22 in comedy podcasts on iTunes and has consistently remained in the top 100 since its launch in July.

In early 2015, Stadtmiller announced "The Mandy Project," a month-long quest to find the perfect Valentine's Day date in partnership with the online dating website Plenty of Fish. For a month, she chronicled going on a series of dates and testing out romantic cliches such as "Play hard to get," "Love like you've never been hurt" and "Everything happens for a reason." The next month she announced that she would be documenting her relationship in "real-time" in a Kindle singles series called "Dear TMI-ary", where she wrote about her new relationship with Pat Dixon. On 11 November 2015, she and Dixon married onstage in a comedy club, as part of Dixon's comedy show. Both the proposal and the wedding were broadcast on social media app Periscope, and tickets could be purchased to attend the joint wedding/comedy show.

In 2016, she began the weekly "Unwifeable" column for New York magazine's The Cut, chronicling her unlikely and unfolding marriage to Pat Dixon despite being, in her eyes, "the most unwifeable woman in New York".

Stadtmiller writes a Substack called "Rabbitholed," which she describes as "The craziest stories in the world you never knew with the analysis you need now."

=== List of News Whore episodes ===
Episode	Interview	Original airdate
01	Colin Quinn	July 2, 2013
02	Wayne Federman	July 15, 2013
03	Sara Benincasa	July 21, 2013
04	Jessica Delfino	July 28, 2013
05	Taylor Negron	August 5, 2013
06	Hannibal Buress	August 11, 2013
07	Bonnie McFarlane	August 19, 2013
08	Erin Carlson	August 25, 2013
09	Lisa Ann	September 1, 2013
10	Sara Schaefer	September 9, 2013
11	Owen Benjamin	September 16, 2013
12	H. Alan Scott	September 23, 2013
13	Ben Gleib	September 30, 2013
14	Stephen Falk	October 7, 2013
15	Eddie Brill	October 14, 2013
16	Warren Leight	October 21, 2013
17	Kelly Shibari	October 28, 2013
18	Charlie Todd	November 4, 2013
19	Seka	November 11, 2013
20	Benari Poulten	November 18, 2013
21	Artie Lange	November 24, 2013
22	Kyle Kinane	December 2, 2013
23	Elizabeth Wurtzel	December 7, 2013
24	J. Keith van Straaten	December 15, 2013
25	Annie Lederman	December 23, 2013
26	Jon Rineman	December 30, 2013
27	Fred Armisen	January 1, 2014
28	Michael Che	January 12, 2014
29	Gary Gulman	January 19, 2014
30	Marianne Garvey	January 26, 2014
31	Lily Burana	February 2, 2014
32	Liam McEneaney	February 9, 2014
33	Jay Louis	February 17, 2014
34	Maya Francis	February 24, 2014
35	Eric Danville	March 3, 2014
36	Jon Friedman	March 10, 2014
37	Sam Roberts	March 17, 2014
38	Belle Knox	March 24, 2014
39	Kristina Wong	March 31, 2014
40	Anna Breslaw	April 7, 2014
41	Michael Malice	April 14, 2014
42	Melissa Stetten	April 21, 2014
43	Kurt Metzger	April 27, 2014
44	Belle Knox 2	May 5, 2014
45	Donal Logue	May 11, 2014
46	Brooke van Poppelen	May 19, 2014
47	Jim Florentine	May 26, 2014
48	Jerry O'Connell	June 1, 2014
49	Morgan Murphy	June 8, 2014
50	Dan Powell	June 16, 2014
51	Christian Finnegan	June 23, 2014
52	Mark Ebner	June 30, 2014
53	Jacqueline Novak	July 7, 2014
54	Myka Fox	July 14, 2014
55	Mike Sacks	July 20, 2014
56	Jim Norton	July 28, 2014
57	Rory Albanese	August 3, 2014
58	Colin Quinn 2	August 10, 2014
59	Dave Hill	August 17, 2014
60	Pia Glenn	August 25, 2014
61	Lisa Ann 2	September 1, 2014
62	Bailey Jay	September 8, 2014
63	Todd Barry	September 14, 2014
64	Julie Klausner	September 23, 2014
65	Maria Heinegg	September 29, 2014
66	Caissie St. Onge	October 5, 2014
67	Carey O'Donnell	October 13, 2014
68	Dan Naturman	October 21, 2014
69	Emily McCombs	October 27, 2014
70	Kevin Brown (actor)	October 13, 2014
71	Julieanne Smolinski	November 11, 2014
72	Noam Dworman	November 18, 2014
73	Marci Robin	November 24, 2014
74	Jenn Hoffman	November 30, 2014
75	Olivia Hall	December 7, 2014
76	Amanda Seales	December 15, 2014
77	Marissa Jaret Winokur and Cathryn Michon	December 7, 2014
78	Ben Joseph	December 30, 2014
79	Kristin M. Davis	January 5, 2015
80	Taylor Negron	January 12, 2015
81	Rich Vos	January 18, 2015
82	Rachel Sklar	January 25, 2015
83	Jackie Kashian	February 2, 2015
84	Michelle Buteau	February 8, 2015
85	Pat Dixon	February 16, 2015
86	Keith Robinson	February 23, 2015
87	Paula Froelich	March 2, 2015
88	Jodi Lennon	March 9, 2015
89	Bex Schwartz	March 16, 2015
90	Tanner Stransky	March 26, 2015
91	Geno Bisconte	March 31, 2015
92	Lloyd Grove	April 7, 2015
93	Jack Burditt	April 14, 2015
94	Pat Dixon 2	April 20, 2015
95	Matt Harkins and Viviana Olen	April 28, 2015
96	Sam Morril	May 5, 2015
97	Amber Nelson	May 11, 2015
98	Nick DiPaolo	May 19, 2015
99	Nate Fridson	May 24, 2015
100	Von Decarlo	May 31, 2015
101	Eric Schaeffer	June 7, 2015
102	Tony Ortega	June 16, 2015
103	Delaney Williams	June 25, 2015
104	Bonnie McFarlane 2	July 2, 2015
105	Rob Shuter	July 10, 2015
106	Dan Soder	July 17, 2015
107	Jo Piazza	July 25, 2015
108	Nick Vatterott	August 4, 2015
109	Chris Laker	August 9, 2015
110	CoCo Brown	August 17, 2015
111	Kambri Crews	August 25, 2015
112	Pete Dominick	August 30, 2015
113	Elizabeth Wurtzel 2	September 8, 2015
114	Graham Smith	September 17, 2015
115	Melissa Petro	September 25, 2015
116	Judah Friedlander	September 28, 2015
117	Polly Mosendz	October 7, 2015
118	Michael C. Moynihan and Jon Ronson	October 12, 2015
117	Jon Ronson	October 23, 2015

== Television appearances ==
- Good Day New York (2006)
- Red Eye (2007)
- Fuse TV's "10 Great Reasons" (2007)
- VH1’s "Rock Band Cometh" (2007)
- The Insider (2010)
- The Joy Behar Show (2010)
- Pepsi: The Flow (2011)
- 20/20 (2012)
- Dr. Drew On Call (2012)
- Media Mayhem with Allison Hope Weiner (2013)
- Jane Velez-Mitchell (2013)
- The Artie Lange Show (2014)
- Katie (2014)
- Inside Amy Schumer (2014)
- Nightline (2014)
- Last Week Tonight with John Oliver (2014)
- CNN Daily Share (2015)

== Radio show appearances ==
- Howard Stern’s In Demand Channel (2006)
- The Lazlow Show (2006)
- Raw Dog Comedy (2007)
- Opie and Anthony (2007, 2013, 2014)
- Maxim Radio (2007)
- WOR (2007)
- The Jenny Hutt Show (2012, 2015)
- The Jane Pratt Show (2012)
- The Alan Colmes Show (2014, 2015)
- My Wife Hates Me (2015)
- The Jenny McCarthy Show (2015)
- Emily McCombs "OverShare" (2015)
- My Wife Hates Me (2016)
