= Joanne Nosuchinsky =

American television personality and model

Joanne Goodhart
- Born: September 26, 1988 (age 38); Freehold Township, New Jersey, U.S.
- Education: Rider University (BFA)
- Height: 5 ft 5 in (1.65 m)
- Beauty pageant titleholder
- Title: Miss New York USA 2013
- Hair color: Brown
- Eye color: Brown
- Major competitions: Miss New York USA 2013 (Winner); Miss USA 2013

Joanne Goodhart (née Nosuchinsky; born September 26, 1988) is an American media personality and beauty pageant titleholder, and co-host of the online video show Mornin'!!! w/ Bill & Joanne. She was formerly a panelist on Fox News' shows Gutfeld! and Red Eye w/ Tom Shillue. Goodhart was the 2013 Miss New York USA.

== Early life ==
Goodhart is from Freehold Township, New Jersey. She went to the Performing Arts Center at Howell High School. In 2010 she graduated from Rider University (summa cum laude) with a BA in Fine Arts and a focus on theatre. She has Italian and Ukrainian ancestry.

== Career ==
While looking through audition notices, Goodhart answered one looking for pageant contestants despite never having competed in pageants before. She represented Hell's Kitchen for her win in the 2013 Miss New York USA competition. She competed in the Miss USA 2013 competition but did not place in the Top 15. At the time of the pageants, Goodhart performed in The Awesome 80s Prom, and continued to do so until the show closed.

=== Fox News shows ===
On September 18, 2013, Goodhart first appeared as a guest panelist on Red Eye w/ Greg Gutfeld on the Fox News Channel. Following the departure of Bill Schulz in November 2013, she became a full-time panelist as of the February 4, 2014, episode. From 2015 to 2016 she was also a cast member on FNC's Gutfeld! on late Saturday evenings. On the Red Eye w/ Tom Shillue broadcast on August 5, 2016, Nosuchinsky stated that after two and half years at Fox News, she would be leaving the network. On the August 6, 2016, broadcast of Red Eye, her last, Goodhart said she would pursue an acting career.

=== Mornin'!!! w/ Bill & Joanne ===
On October 2, 2017, Goodhart and former Red Eye cohort Bill Schulz launched Mornin'!!! w/ Bill Schulz and Joanne Nosuchinsky on Anthony Cumia's Compound Media entertainment network. In April 2024, Compound Media merged with Gavin McInnes' Censored.TV network, resulting in Compound Media laying off their staff, seeing Schulz and Goodhart moving their show to YouTube, and shortening the name of their show to Mornin'!!! w/ Bill & Joanne.

== Personal life ==
Goodhart, formerly Nosuchinsky, married actor Douglas Goodhart on May 12, 2023. She is Roman Catholic.

Awards and achievements
Preceded by Johanna Sambucini	Miss New York USA; 2013	Succeeded by Candace Kendall
