= Don Jamieson =

Don Jamieson may refer to:

- Don Jamieson (politician) (1921–1986), Canadian politician, diplomat and broadcaster
- Don Jamieson (comedian) (born 1966), American stand-up comedian and television host
