= Pat Dixon (comedian) =

American comedian and journalist

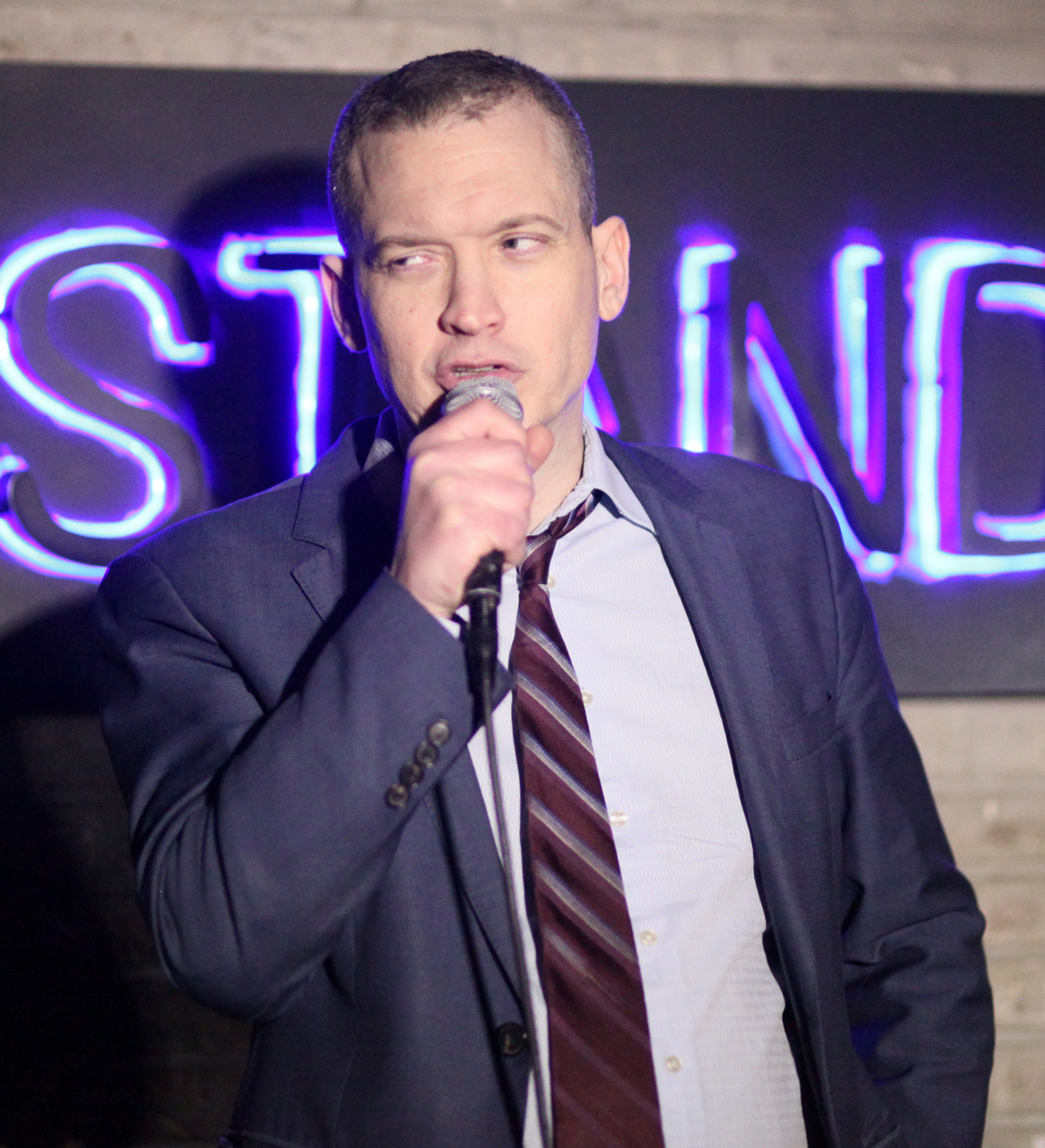
- Dixon performing at The Stand in February 2017
- Born: 1970 (age 55–56)
- Spouse: Mandy Stadtmiller (m. 2015; div. 2021)
- Notable work: The NYC Crime Report with Pat Dixon; Comedy Central Presents; Best Week Ever

Comedy career
- Medium: Comedy; Journalism; Podcast
- Genres: Observational comedy Comedic journalism Black humor Human behavior
- Subjects: Current events; Crime; American politics
- Website: www.comedianpatdixon.com

Pat Dixon (born 1970) is an American comedian, podcaster, and journalist who lives and works in New York City. He is best known as creator and host of The NYC Crime Report with Pat Dixon.

== Career ==
Dixon was a cast member on the reboot of VH1's Best Week Ever, and had his own half-hour Comedy Central Presents special. He's also been seen on The Late Late Show, BBC America's The World Stands Up, Gotham Comedy Live, TBS's Very Funny Show, and TV Land's Best Night In.

He has released three stand-up comedy albums titled White Devil, Goodbye Forever, Fatty, and King of Clubs.

In 2015, he appeared as an actor in the short film Muck, which premiered at the Sarasota Film Festival and was also an official selection in the Palm Springs International Film Festival, the Montclair Film Festival, the Berkshire International Film Festival and the Capital City Film Festival.

Dixon is the creator of the Nearly Naked Lady Hour and the subsequent Miss Nearly Naked Lady.

=== The NYC Crime Report with Pat Dixon ===
The NYC Crime Report with Pat Dixon
- Genre: Observational comedy Comedic journalism Black humor Human behavior
- Format: Audio & video
- Language: English

Cast and voices
- Hosted by: Pat Dixon

Production
- Length: 45 – 120 min.

Publication
- Provider: Compound Censored

The NYC Crime Report with Pat Dixon is a podcast about current crime news from the New York City tabloids. In October 2015, it was announced Dixon was the latest addition to the Compound Media Network of podcasts and comedians. In June 2022, Dixon left Compound Media after an off-air altercation with fellow comedian and In Hot Water host Geno Bisconte. He signed with online video platform Censored.TV shortly afterwards.

== Personal life ==
In November 2015, Dixon married journalist and performer Mandy Stadtmiller. Their nuptials were shared on stage at the Gotham Comedy Club as part of the New York Comedy Festival. The couple divorced in 2021.
