= Pat Dixon =

Pat Dixon may refer to:

- Pat Dixon (producer)
- Pat Dixon (comedian)
