= Compound Media =

American streaming media platform

- Type: Periodical subscription model
- Headquarters: New York City, U.S.

Programming
- Language: English
- Format: Audio and video podcast

Ownership
- Owner: Anthony Cumia
- Operator: Erik Nagel

History
- Launch date: August 4, 2014; 12 years ago
- Closed: June 30, 2024; 2 years ago
- Replaced by: Compound Censored
- Former names: The Anthony Cumia Network

Links
- Website: compoundmedia.com

Compound Media (formerly The Anthony Cumia Network) was an American subscription-based platform for audio and video podcasts. It was launched as The Anthony Cumia Network in 2014 by radio personality Anthony Cumia, who began hosting The Anthony Cumia Show on it after leaving SiriusXM. The network subsequently added more shows, including those hosted by Bill Schulz, Joanne Nosuchinsky, Michael Malice, Kevin Brennan, Don Jamieson, Chrissie Mayr, Gavin McInnes, and Geno Bisconte. It relaunched as Compound Media in 2016.

== History ==
=== Background ===
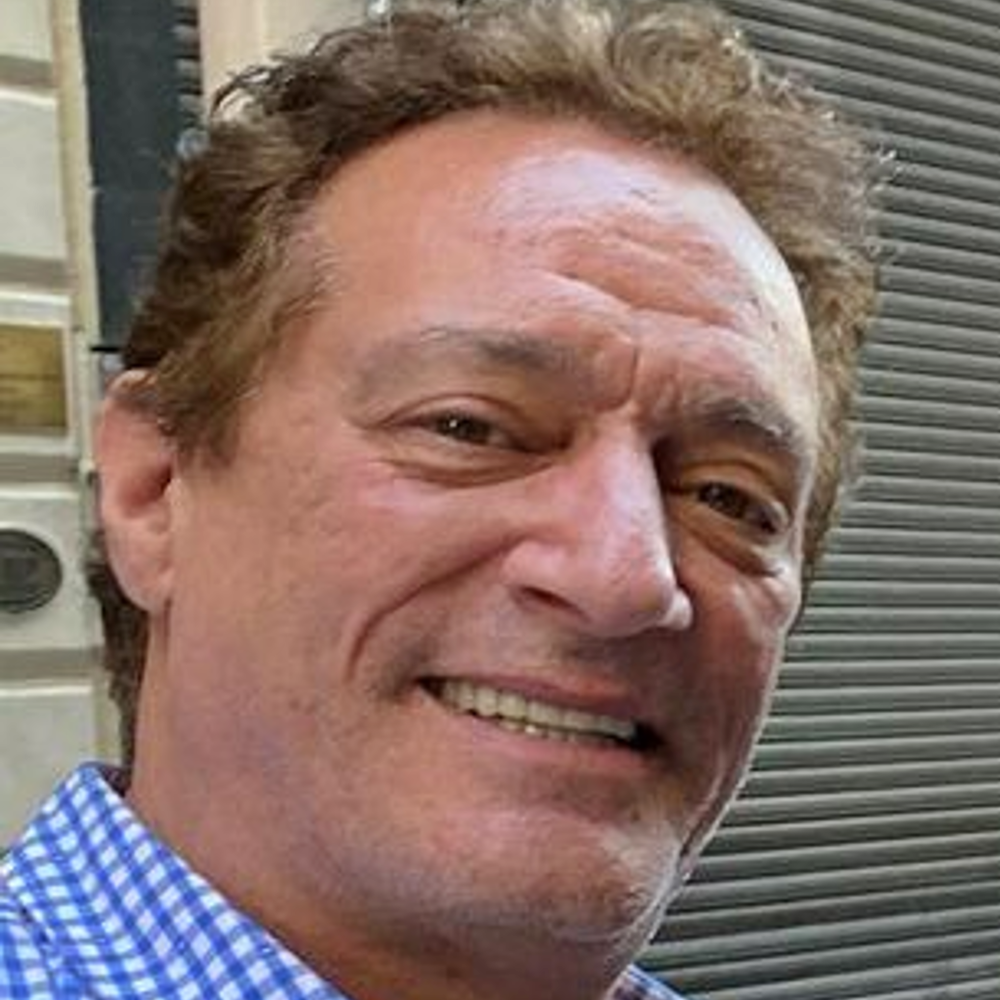
Anthony Cumia, the network's founder

On July 3, 2014, radio personality Anthony Cumia was fired by the satellite radio provider SiriusXM after he posted a series of tweets described by SiriusXM as "racially-charged and hate-filled". The tweets were about a black woman who Cumia said had punched him after objecting to him taking pictures of her in Times Square in New York City. At the time of his firing, Cumia gave his blessing for his radio co-hosts, Gregg "Opie" Hughes and Jim Norton of Opie and Anthony, to continue broadcasting without him, acknowledging the pair's obligation to fulfill their contracts. Hughes and Norton began their new show, Opie with Jim Norton, on July 14 before the channel was renamed from The Opie and Anthony Channel to SiriusXM Talk.

On July 8, 2014, Cumia announced the launch of his new audio and video podcast The Anthony Cumia Show on his new on-demand streaming media platform The Anthony Cumia Network, with subscribers paying monthly or annual fees to access content. Cumia had occasionally broadcast live video streams from his custom built basement studio at his Roslyn Heights, New York home on UStream named Live From the Compound from 2012 to 2014, initially as a hobby and were casual in nature. In the wake of his firing, Cumia said, he "was able to just get servers and be able to feed that show out to the public without having to start from scratch", allowing him to launch within weeks.

=== Launch and developments ===
On August 4, 2014, The Anthony Cumia Show began airing, Monday through Thursday. During the opening months some shows aired from Cumia's basement studio, by his home bar, or in his garden. In November 2014, Cumia said the network had over 40,000 paid subscribers.

On March 10, 2015, the Legion of Skanks (Big Jay Oakerson, Dave Smith, and Luis J. Gomez) hosted a podcast after The Anthony Cumia Show. Starting in June 2015 subscribers also gained access to the Legion of Skanks, making it the first podcast to join The Anthony Cumia Network full-time. The show aired on Tuesdays and Wednesdays at 9pm. As Gomez described it in 2016, "When you come to watch the Legion of Skanks show, you should be hearing racist, sexist, offensive shit. If you're upset about that, don't watch the show." The show announced on May 16, 2016, that it would be leaving the network May 31.

Gavin McInnes launched The Gavin McInnes Show on the network on June 15, 2015, airing Monday through Thursday. The idea for the Proud Boys, which McInnes founded, originated in "the Compound", Cumia's mansion, around 2016. Cumia has said that it began as a prank on a Compound Media employee that "mutated" and "it was never supposed to go any further than that". Men associated with Compound Media met at New York City bars and the Proud Boys were formed at those meetings, according to the Southern Poverty Law Center. In monologues on his show, McInnes publicized the Proud Boys and laid out the group's ideology of Western chauvinism. He praised right-wing violence and regularly used racial slurs. Among his guests were far-right figures Milo Yiannopoulos, Richard Spencer, Jason Kessler, Christopher Cantwell, Mike Cernovich, Faith Goldy, Roosh V, and former Ku Klux Klan leader David Duke. He also mingled with comedians considered more mainstream.

In 2016, The Anthony Cumia Network relaunched as Compound Media. Redbar Radio, hosted by Mike David, first aired on the network on November 2, 2016. The show then aired every Friday at 4pm for eleven weeks.

Author Michael Malice joined Compound Media on June 7, 2017, with the launch of the "YOUR WELCOME" with Michael Malice podcast. The podcast was put on hold in 2018 with the launch of a new show titled Night Shade.

On August 21, 2017, Cumia announced the addition of comedian and actor Artie Lange as the co-host of his show, The Artie and Anthony Show. The show aired on Monday to Thursday, from 4–6 p.m., starting September 5, 2017.

On October 2, 2017, Mornin'! with Bill Schulz launched as the network's new morning show. 2013 Miss New York USA winner and former Red Eye w/ Tom Shillue panelist Joanne Nosuchinsky joined Mornin! in February 2018.

In May 2018, it was announced that due to his health and legal issues, Lange would be taking an indefinite hiatus from the show, and it would revert to the name The Anthony Cumia Show, with third mic Dave Landau continuing as co-host.

On June 4, 2019, the heavy metal music talk show That Jamieson Show launched, featuring comedian and That Metal Show co-host Don Jamieson.

In February 2021, The Anthony Cumia Show co-host Dave Landau left Compound Media to join Steven Crowder's show, Louder with Crowder.

On March 31, 2021, Cumia launched a second show, replacing his The Anthony Cumia Show Wednesday show, titled Compound Censored, with Gavin McInnes as his co-host. The show's title is a portmanteau which combines Compound Media with McInnes' subscription-based network Censored.TV, where the show also broadcasts.

=== Closure and merger with Censored.TV ===
In June 2024, Cumia announced that the Compound Media studios were closing and that he was merging with Gavin McInnes' network, Censored.TV as Compound Media was no longer making a profit, and hadn't for at least two years. This news comes on the heels of Anthony's move to South Carolina where he built a studio in his new home from where he hosts The Anthony Cumia show and co-host's Compound Censored with McInnes. McInnes changed the name of his platform to Compound Censored after the merger.

== Shows ==
Show Title (Note: Former shows listed in italics. Some former shows are not listed due to removal from the Compound Media archives and/or lack of credible external references.)	Start date	End date	Host(s)	Notes	References
2 Drink Minimum	September 9, 2016	May 7, 2018	Pantelis; Mike Ward		
21 Gun HD	February 4, 2022	Present	Kevin Sullivan		
The Anthony Cumia Show	July 8, 2014	Present	Anthony Cumia	Formerly co-hosted by both Artie Lange, and Dave Landau, respectively	
The Artie and Anthony Show	September 5, 2017	May 14, 2018	Anthony Cumia; Artie Lange		
Burning Bridges	March 20, 2017	June 19, 2019	Kevin Brennan Brian McCarthy		
Compound Censored	March 31, 2021	Present	Anthony Cumia; Gavin McInnes	Also broadcasts on McInnes' streaming media platform Censored.TV	
The Dump with Steve Conti	August 9, 2021	Present	Steve Conti		
East Side Dave Show	September 9, 2016	January 25, 2022	Dave McDonald; Roy Harter		
A Fair One	June 27, 2018	January 27, 2022	Shane Gillis; Tommy Pope		
The Gavin McInnes Show	June 15, 2015	August 23, 2017	Gavin McInnes		
In Hot Water	June 6, 2016	Present	Geno Bisconte	Formerly co-hosted by Aaron Berg	
In Hot Water Football Show	September 15, 2022	Present	Geno Bisconte		
Legion of Skanks	March 10, 2015	May 31, 2016	Jay Oakerson; Dave Smith; Luis J. Gomez	Moved to GaS Digital	
Mornin'!	October 2, 2017	Present	Joanne Nosuchinsky; Bill Schulz		
Night Shade	July 9, 2018	October 1, 2020	Michael Malice		
The NYC Crime Report with Pat Dixon	October 27, 2015	June 16, 2022	Pat Dixon		
Redbar Radio	September 9, 2016	January 17, 2017	Mike David		
Safe Space	October 27, 2016	January 27, 2022	Taleeb Starks		
TBD Show	June 17, 2019	Present	Garrett Andritz; Donovan Castillo	Formerly co-hosted by Pat Dixon	
That Jamieson Show	June 4, 2019	Present	Don Jamieson		
Would You Kindly	March 26, 2020	Present	Bryan Johnson; Erik Nagel		
Wet Spot	June 11, 2019	June 25, 2024	Chrissie Mayr		
"YOUR WELCOME" with Michael Malice	June 7, 2017	May 23, 2018	Michael Malice	Moved to PodcastOne	
