= How to Piss in Public =

2012 book by Gavin McInnes

- Author: Gavin McInnes
- Original title: The Death of Cool
- Language: English
- Genre: Memoir
- Publisher: Scribner
- Publication date: 2012
- Publication place: United States
- Pages: 271
- ISBN: 978-1-4516-1417-6

How to Piss in Public: From Teenage Rebellion to the Hangover of Adulthood is the 2012 autobiography of the British-Canadian media personality Gavin McInnes. It has also been published as The Death of Cool.

== Summary ==
Gavin McInnes envisioned the book as a collection of his best bar stories. It consists of 41 stories from his life arranged in a three-act structure. He grew up in small-town Canada and tells stories of how he took drugs, was drunk and played in a punk band. As a young man, he moved to Montreal and co-founded the magazine Vice, which he sold for a large sum of money when it became successful. Much of the book consists of McInnes' anecdotes about intoxication, sex and violence. The latter part of the book is about how he met his wife and became a father.

== Reception ==
Caitlin Stall-Paquet of Paste wrote that the book reveals "the infuriating man-child within this punk-rocker-writer-hipster-king", and yet manages to be "an exciting, continuously forward-moving narrative". Kirkus Reviews called it "a monumentally unfunny memoir of being a jerk", and wrote that it seems like McInnes wants to write like Hunter S. Thompson but lacks Thompson's "inspired lunacy".
