= Bailey Jay =

American pornographic film actress

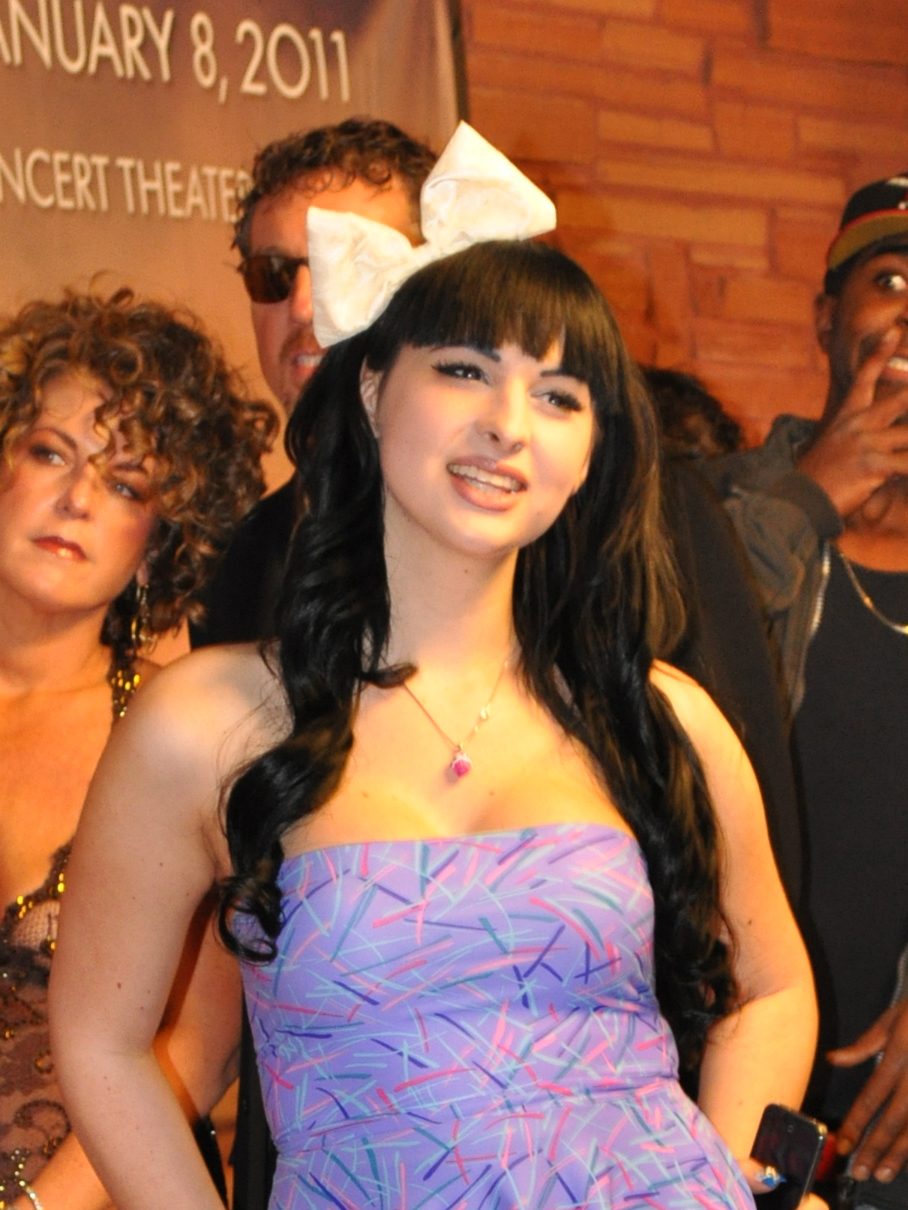
- Jay at the 2011 AVN Awards
- Other names: Lola; B.J; Line Trap; Harley Quinn; Bailey Slay
- Occupations: Pornographic film actress; adult model; presenter; podcaster
- Spouse: Matthew Terhune (m. 2011)
- Website: ts-baileyjay.com

Bailey Jay is an American transgender pornographic film actress, adult model, presenter and podcaster.

== Career ==
In 2011 and 2012, Jay won the AVN Award for transgender performer of the year. She also co-hosts the podcast The Bailey Jay Show (formerly Bailey Jay Radio) with her husband, photographer Matthew Terhune, the podcast The Trans Witching Hour with Bailey Jay (formerly Gender Coaching with Bailey Jay) that deals with spirituality, the horror-themed podcast Blood Lust with Bailey Jay and also co-hosts the transgender and transsexuality advice podcast Sugar and Spice (formerly Third Gender Radio) with Jen Richards of We Happy Trans.

In 2014 she worked as a presenter for Vice Media on The Jim Norton Show. She appeared as a co-host in all four episodes before the show's cancellation.

== Personal life ==
Jay is of Irish, Swedish, Spanish, Ute Indigenous American, and Italian descent. She has been married to Matthew Terhune since 2011.

== Filmography and appearances ==
=== Filmography ===
Year	Title	Role	Notes
2014	American Dream	Mom 2	Cary Nokey music video
2014	The Jim Norton Show	Herself	Announcer
2014	The Approval Matrix	Herself	Episode: "America's Hall Monitors"
2015	NICE TIPS!	Herself	Advice columnist
2015	Inside Amy Schumer	Herself	Episode: "Last Fuckable Day"
2017	Return to Return to Nuke 'Em High AKA Volume 2	Cameo	Uncredited

=== Podcasts ===
Date	Title	Notes
2010–2021	The Bailey Jay Show	Weekly podcast with co-host Matthew Terhune.
2011	You Know What Dude	Two appearances
2014	The Hole	Episode 176
2014	News Whore with Mandy Stadtmiller	Episode 62
2015	Tangentially Speaking	Episode 128
2015	Savage Lovecast	Episode 464
2015, 2020, 2022, 2023	Ultraculture with Jason Louv	Episode 7 34, 109, and 158
2021–present	Thee Invisible Cabin	Patreon exclusive podcast. Reboot of The Bailey Jay Show.

== Awards ==
- 2010 Transgender Erotica Award winner – Best Solo Model
- 2011 AVN Award winner – Transsexual Performer of the Year
- 2011 XBIZ Award nominee – Transsexual Performer of the Year
- 2012 AVN Award winner – Transsexual Performer of the Year
- 2012 XBIZ Award nominee – Transsexual Performer of the Year
- 2016 AVN Award winner – Favorite Trans Performer (Fan award)
