= Best Week Ever =

American comedy series

- Genre: Comedy; Entertainment news
- Presented by: Paul F. Tompkins; Chuck Nice; Rob Huebel; Paul Scheer; Melissa Rauch; Doug Benson; Nick Kroll; Rachael Harris; Jessica St. Clair; Mike Britt; Christian Finnegan; Adam Winer; Michelle Buteau; John Mulaney; Nick Turner; Frangela; Sherrod Small; Dan St. Germain; Jared Logan; Pat Dixon; Pete Lee; Michael Che; Patton Oswalt; Michael Ian Black
- Country of origin: United States
- Original language: English

Production
- Camera setup: Multiple
- Running time: 30 minutes

Original release
- Network: VH1
- Release: January 23, 2004 – June 12, 2009
- Release: January 18, 2013 – April 23, 2014

Best Week Ever is an American comedy series created and executive produced for VH1 by Fred Graver. The series, which first aired from January 23, 2004, to June 12, 2009, is a spin-off of the I Love the... series and was renamed Best Week Ever With Paul F. Tompkins in October 2008. In January 2010, it was announced that the show was canceled. On August 3, 2012, VH1 announced the return of Best Week Ever. New weekly episodes began January 18, 2013, but on April 23, 2014, VH1 canceled the series again.

== Format ==
Best Week Ever features comedians analyzing the previous week's developments in pop culture, including recent happenings in entertainment and celebrity gossip. It followed a similar format to that set by the mini-series I Love the 80s and its successors. Episodes aired on Fridays at 10:00 p.m. and repeated several times over the weekend. At the end of every episode, the show named which celebrity, group of people, or object had "the Best Week Ever". The program's original Typepad-hosted blog bestweekever.blogs.com originally served as an ersatz online writer's room, mainly used to preview the events in the news which would end up in the Friday episode. In 2006, BestWeekEver.tv was launched to serve as more of a daily blog mostly separate from the program itself (beyond promotions and tie-ins for the show), detailing humorous stories in the news, odd television and YouTube videos, and features main contributors Alex Blagg, Bob Castrone, Michelle Collins, Dan Hopper, and formerly Sara Schaefer's observations on pop culture and other items.

=== Single host ===
Beginning October 24, 2008, the show adopted a format with a single host who summarized the week's events. The show was renamed Best Week Ever With Paul F. Tompkins. Tompkins introduced topics from behind a podium, summarizing the week's events. Tompkins occasionally threw to panelists (usually Jessica St. Clair, Paul Scheer, Mike Britt, or Doug Benson) who offered their own take on a particular subject. Tompkins, a long-time panelist, had been with the show since its inception.

=== Weekly format ===
In both the original and latter format, each week consisted of four main segments and at least one peripheral segment. The first segment had no specific title and featured the biggest news stories of the week. The second segment was "The Sizzler". It featured Chuck Nice discussing the "hot" celebrity gossip. This section was formatted to satirize celebrity tabloid shows such as The Insider. Next was "In Case You Missed" which briefly showcases several short clips from the week's television (and occasionally the Internet and radio). The show ended with somebody being awarded "the Best Week Ever", an ironic prize usually given to somebody or something which had been featured extensively on news programs, a viral video (or any new meme), or prominent reality show contestant of the week. Recipients include Barack Obama (after beating out Hillary Clinton for the 2008 Democratic Presidential nomination), the Dramatic Prairie Dog, 2 Girls 1 Cup, and Midget Mac.

=== Additional programming ===
The show had podcast and IPTV elements, including Best Night Ever, where a host went through the night or weekend in television in a four-minute segment, and extra footage and segments on VH1's VSPOT online channel. For some time before the format change, VH1 began to have "Best Day Ever" episodes that aired Monday through Thursday for about five minutes and had different comedians go through the pop culture events of the day. Additionally, at the end of each calendar year, the show prepared a Best Year Ever special filled with "clips of celeb horrors of the past year".

=== Regular segments ===
- "Eight Words or Less", Doug Benson reviewed popular movies in eight words or less.
- "Paul F. Tompkins: Celebrity Defender.", In this segment Paul F. Tompkins attempted to comically defend celebrities while they are on trial.
- "Doug Benson: Pop Culture Bachelor", comedian Doug Benson gave roses to events of the week he wanted to see more of, in a similar manner to the ABC show The Bachelor.
- "Blind Item": A panelist offered clues as to the identity of a mystery celebrity, only to give a false answer contradictory to the correct identity.
- "Doug Benson TSI: Trailer Scene Investigator". Doug Benson discussed recent movie trailers.
- "The Express Lane", a quick review of the biggest pop culture stories.
- "Five Good Reasons", coming up with reasons to do one particular unfavorable act, such as voting in the 2004 elections or see the worst movie of the week.
- "Upgrade/Downgrade", giving a thumbs-up or -down on items in a certain category.
- "What Your Purchases Say About You", decoding the hidden messages in your spending.
- "Idol Worship", a recap of events on American Idol that week.
- "Ask Best Week Ever", a segment in which a man would answer questions from fans.
- "Hot/Not Hot", a summary of three weekly stories; the third was always of an odd theme.

== Extended hiatus and cancellation ==
Normally, Best Week Ever would leave for a summer break during July and August and return in September. New York magazine reported that Best Week Ever was on an extended hiatus until January 2010 and that it would return in the fall with Paul F. Tompkins hosting. However, the staffers feared that the show would never come back. The last episode aired June 12, 2009, with Dan Moschella named as having had the Best Week Ever.

In January 2010, the show's website, BestWeekEver.tv announced the show's cancellation.

== Reboot and second cancellation ==
On August 3, 2012, VH1 announced the return of Best Week Ever. New weekly episodes began January 18, 2013. However, on April 23, 2014, VH1 again canceled the series a second time.

== Criticism ==
The series led to criticism of the people of America. In its recounting of the events of the past week, Best Week Ever had been seen as a sign of the short attention span of millions of Americans. In a 2005 interview on The Daily Show with Jon Stewart, NBC Nightly News anchor Brian Williams said: "We have such short attention spans. Heck, VH1 has a show about last week". In an article on the Pipe Dream website about VH1's decade-retrospective shows, writer Jeanette Duffy noted that "VH1 has moved on from exploiting entire decades to making us reminisce over events that happened just days ago in the Best Week Ever", jokingly suggesting that cable networks might eventually produce the "Best Five Minutes Ever".
