= That Metal Show =

US talk show

- Presented by: Eddie Trunk; Don Jamieson; Jim Florentine
- Narrated by: David Coverdale (season 12); Bobby Blitz (season 13); Leslie West (season 14)
- Theme music composer: Ron "Bumblefoot" Thal
- Country of origin: United States
- Original language: English
- No. of seasons: 14
- No. of episodes: 127

Production
- Production locations: New York City (seasons 1–4 & 13–14); Los Angeles (seasons 5–12)
- Running time: 21–22 minutes (seasons 1–5); 43–45 minutes (season 3 premiere & seasons 6–14)

Original release
- Network: VH1 Classic
- Release: November 15, 2008 – May 9, 2015

That Metal Show is a talk show that premiered on VH1 Classic on November 15, 2008 and ended on May 9, 2015 with a span of 14 seasons. Hosted by Eddie Trunk, Don Jamieson and Jim Florentine, the series features three hosts interviewing musicians from the hard rock and heavy metal genre in addition to artists and non-musicians who are metal fans while various segments intervene throughout the episode.

VH1 Classic discontinued producing more episodes of That Metal Show on January 19, 2016 due to the network's transition to MTV Classic seven months later.

== Recurring segments ==
- Stump the Trunk
- Pick of the Week (Seasons 1–11 & 13–14)
- What's Going On with... (formerly Whatever Happened to...) (Seasons 1–11 & 13)
- The Throwdown (Seasons 1–11 & 13–14)
- Living the High Life with... (Season 3)
- The Rant (Seasons 4 & 12)
- TMS Vault (Seasons 5–14)
- TMS Top 5 (Seasons 6–14)
- TMS Top 4 (Season 10)
- Metal Modem (Seasons 12–14)
- Take It or Leave It (Seasons 12–14)
- Put it On the Table (Seasons 12–14)
- On the Shelf (Seasons 12–13)
- On the Fringes (Seasons 12–13)
- TMS Book Club (Seasons 12–13)
- TMS Worldwide (Season 12)
- Behind the Music Video (Season 12)
- Rock & Roll Landmarks (Season 12)
- Origins (Season 12)
- Rank (Seasons 12–14)
- Underrated (Seasons 12–14)
- Take It or Take It (Season 13)

== Miss Box of Junk Girl ==
The duties of the Miss Box of Junk Girl are to bring out the prize box for Stump the Trunk and to place choices in order for TMS Top 5.

- Kerri Lee Tucker (Seasons 2–3; died 2009)
- Jennifer Gottlieb (Seasons 4–14)

== Series overview ==
Season	Episodes	Originally released	
Season	Episodes	First released	Last released
1	7	November 15, 2008	December 27, 2008
2	8	March 7, 2009	April 27, 2009
3	9	October 3, 2009	November 28, 2009
4	10	February 6, 2010	April 24, 2010
5	9	May 8, 2010	July 17, 2010
6	9	October 16, 2010	December 11, 2010
7	8	March 19, 2011	May 14, 2011
8	10	August 20, 2011	October 22, 2011
9	9	November 11, 2011	January 14, 2012
10	8	March 31, 2012	May 19, 2012
11	8	July 21, 2012	September 29, 2012
12	8	June 1, 2013	July 20, 2013
13	12	January 18, 2014	April 5, 2014
14	12	February 21, 2015	May 9, 2015

== Episodes ==
=== Season 1 (2008) ===
No. overall	No. in season	Title	Guest(s)	Original release date
1	1	"Lita Ford"	Lita Ford	November 15, 2008
2	2	"Yngwie Malmsteen"	Yngwie Malmsteen	November 22, 2008
3	3	"Twisted Sister"	Dee Snider & Jay Jay French	November 29, 2008
4	4	"Mike Portnoy"	Mike Portnoy	December 6, 2008
5	5	"Mike Piazza"	Mike Piazza	December 13, 2008
6	6	"Ace Frehley"	Ace Frehley	December 20, 2008
7	7	"Rush"	Geddy Lee & Alex Lifeson	December 27, 2008

=== Season 2 (2009) ===
No. overall	No. in season	Title	Guest(s)	Original release date
8	1	"Vinnie Paul"	Vinnie Paul	March 7, 2009
9	2	"Frank Bello"	Frank Bello	March 14, 2009
10	3	"Extreme"	Nuno Bettencourt & Gary Cherone	March 21, 2009
11	4	"Anvil"	Steve "Lips" Kudlow & Rob Reiner	March 28, 2009
12	5	"Duff McKagan"	Duff McKagan	April 4, 2009
13	6	"Geoff Tate"	Geoff Tate	April 11, 2009
14	7	"Scott Gorham"	Scott Gorham	April 18, 2009
15	8	"Heaven & Hell"	Ronnie James Dio & Geezer Butler	April 27, 2009

=== Season 3 (2009) ===
The season premiere kicked off as a one-hour special at the Hard Rock Cafe featuring live performances from Anvil plus Q&A with the band and an appearance from some special guests.

No. overall	No. in season	Title	Guest(s)	Original release date
16	1	"Anvil & Sacha Gervasi"	Steve "Lips" Kudlow, Rob Reiner, G5 and Sacha Gervasi	October 3, 2009
17	2	"Rob Halford"	Rob Halford	October 10, 2009
18	3	"Chris Jericho"	Chris Jericho	October 17, 2009
19	4	"Overkill"	Bobby Blitz & D.D. Verni	October 24, 2009
20	5	"Blackie Lawless"	Blackie Lawless	October 31, 2009
21	6	"Steve Vai"	Steve Vai	November 7, 2009
22	7	"Jamey Jasta"	Jamey Jasta	November 14, 2009
23	8	"Ratt"	Stephen Pearcy & Warren DeMartini	November 21, 2009
24	9	"Peter Criss"	Peter Criss	November 28, 2009

=== Season 4 (2010) ===
Keri Leigh Tucker, the first Miss Box of Junk Girl, died in late 2009 and was replaced by Jennifer Gottlieb. A memorial dedicated to Keri Leigh was shown after the end credits to the season premiere. This season also marks the last to be filmed in New York before the show relocated to Los Angeles beginning with Season 5 until Season 13.

No. overall	No. in season	Title	Guest(s)	Original release date
25	1	"Dave Mustaine"	Dave Mustaine	February 6, 2010
26	2	"Joey Kramer"	Joey Kramer	February 13, 2010
27	3	"Accept"	Wolf Hoffmann & Mark Tornillo	February 20, 2010
28	4	"Joe Lynn Turner"	Joe Lynn Turner	February 27, 2010
29	5	"Scott Ian & Pearl Aday"	Scott Ian & Pearl Aday	March 13, 2010
30	6	"Rudy Sarzo & Richard Christy"	Rudy Sarzo & Richard Christy	March 20, 2010
31	7	"Brian Posehn"	Brian Posehn	March 27, 2010
32	8	"Winger"	Kip Winger & Reb Beach	April 3, 2010
33	9	"Joe Satriani"	Joe Satriani	April 17, 2010
34	10	"Scrap Metal"	none	April 24, 2010

=== Season 5 (2010) ===
This season marks the first to be filmed at the Sony Pictures Studios in Glendale, California (a suburb of Los Angeles).

No. overall	No. in season	Title	Guest(s)	Original release date
35	1	"Lemmy Kilmister"	Lemmy Kilmister	May 8, 2010
36	2	"Zakk Wylde"	Zakk Wylde	May 15, 2010
37	3	"Rob Halford"	Rob Halford	May 22, 2010
38	4	"Steven Adler & Chip Z'Nuff"	Steven Adler & Chip Z'Nuff	June 5, 2010
39	5	"Alice Cooper"	Alice Cooper	June 12, 2010
40	6	"Rob Zombie"	Rob Zombie	June 10, 2010
41	7	"Dokken"	Don Dokken & George Lynch	June 26, 2010
42	8	"Slayer"	Kerry King & Dave Lombardo	July 10, 2010
43	9	"Scrap Metal"	none	July 17, 2010

=== Season 6 (2010) ===
Beginning with Season 6, the show aired as a one-hour format in addition to including a musical guest for each episode.

No. overall	No. in season	Title	Guest(s)	Musical Guest(s)	Original release date
44	1	"Tribute to Ronnie James Dio"	Geezer Butler, Vinny Appice, Wendy Dio, Simon Wright, Rob Halford and Tom Morello	Craig Goldy	October 16, 2010
45	2	"Michael Anthony/Kip Winger/Carrie Keagan"	Michael Anthony, Kip Winger and Carrie Keagan	Tracii Guns	October 23, 2010
46	3	"Philip Anselmo & Bruce Kulick"	Philip Anselmo & Bruce Kulick	George Lynch	October 30, 2010
47	4	"Phil Collen & Frankie Banali"	Phil Collen & Frankie Banali	Richie Kotzen	November 6, 2010
48	5	"Tesla & Chuck Billy"	Jeff Keith, Frank Hannon and Chuck Billy	Tracii Guns	November 13, 2010
49	6	"Bill Ward & Glenn Danzig"	Bill Ward & Glenn Danzig	Richie Kotzen	November 20, 2010
50	7	"Jason Bonham & Rikki Rocket"	Jason Bonham & Rikki Rocket	Craig Goldy	November 26, 2010
51	8	"Slash & Myles Kennedy"	Slash & Myles Kennedy	George Lynch	December 4, 2010
52	9	"Scrap Metal"	none	none	December 11, 2010
Season 6 outtakes and unseen extras

=== Season 7 (2011) ===
Season 7 continued to have a guest guitarist for each episode while introducing a guest bassist.

No. overall	No. in season	Title	Guest(s)	Musical Guest(s)	Original release date
53	1	"Kirk Hammet & Uli Jon Roth"	Kirk Hammett & Uli Jon Roth	Doug Aldrich	March 19, 2011
54	2	"Ace Frehley & Billy Sheehan"	Ace Frehley & Billy Sheehan	Gilby Clarke	March 26, 2011
55	3	"David Coverdale & Lita Ford"	David Coverdale & Lita Ford	Doug Aldrich	April 2, 2011
56	4	"Chris Jericho & Yngwie Malmsteen"	Chris Jericho & Yngwie Malmsteen	Gilby Clarke	April 9, 2011
57	5	"Duff McKagan & Glenn Hughes"	Duff McKagan & Glenn Hughes	Billy Sheehan	April 16, 2011
58	6	"Matt Sorum/Cherie Currie/Jim Norton"	Matt Sorum, Cherie Curie and Jim Norton	Paul Gilbert	April 23, 2011
59	7	"Sebastian Bach & Anvil"	Sebastian Bach, Steve "Lips" Kudlow and Robb Reiner	Paul Gilbert	April 30, 2011
60	8	"Carmine Appice & Dave Meniketti"	Carmine Appice & Dave Meniketti	Billy Sheehan	May 7, 2011

=== Season 8 (2011) ===
The episode featuring guests Michael Sweet, Jani Lane and Taime Downe featured the final appearance of Jani Lane as this episode was already taped prior to his death on August 11. It was originally scheduled to air on October 1, but was moved to August 27 as the second episode where the episode included a special opening dedicated Lane's memory. In addition, the episode with Stephen Pearcy and Tim "Ripper" Owens now aired as the seventh episode.

No. overall	No. in season	Title	Guest(s)	Musical Guest(s)	Original release date
61	1	"Tony Iommi"	Tony Iommi	Phil Collen	August 20, 2011
62	2	"Michael Sweet/Jani Lane/Taime Downe"	Michael Sweet, Jani Lane and Taime Downe	Phil Collen	August 27, 2011
63	3	"Tom Morello & Doug Pinnick"	Tom Morello & Doug Pinnick	Tony MacAlpine	September 3, 2011
64	4	"Corey Taylor & Night Ranger"	Corey Taylor, Jack Blades and Brad Gillis	Billy Sheehan	September 10, 2011
65	5	"Anthrax and Dave Sabo"	Scott Ian, Charlie Benante and Dave Sabo	Vinnie Moore	September 17, 2011
66	6	"Sammy Hagar"	Sammy Hagar	Alex Skolnick	September 24, 2011
67	7	"Stephen Pearcy & Tim "Ripper" Owens"	Stephen Pearcy & Tim "Ripper" Owens	Billy Sheehan	October 1, 2011
68	8	"Mike Portnoy & John Sykes"	Mike Portnoy & John Sykes	Tony MacAlpine	October 8, 2011
69	9	"Rick Nielsen & Graham Bonnet"	Rick Nielsen & Graham Bonnet	Vinnie Moore	October 15, 2011
70	10	"Lars Ulrich"	Lars Ulrich	Alex Skolnick	October 22, 2011

=== Season 9 (2011–12) ===
The season premiere was filmed during Guns N' Roses' Chinese Democracy Tour at the American Airlines Arena in Miami, FL. Season 9 marked the first season to be presented in widescreen format.

No. overall	No. in season	Title	Guest(s)	Musical Guest(s)	Original release date
71	1	"Axl Rose Special"	Axl Rose & DJ Ashba	none	November 11, 2011
72	2	"Slash & Sam Dunn"	Slash & Sam Dunn	Glenn Hughes	November 19, 2011
73	3	"Brian Johnson"	Brian Johnson	Warren DeMartini	November 26, 2011
74	4	"Dave Mustaine & Kill Devil Hill"	Dave Mustaine, Vinnie Appice and Rex Brown	Warren DeMartini	December 3, 2011
75	5	"Marilyn Manson & Biff Byford"	Marilyn Manson & Biff Byford	Chris Broderick	December 10, 2011
76	6	"Sully Erna & Jesse James Dupree"	Sully Erna & Jesse James Dupree	Glenn Hughes	December 17, 2011
77	7	"Tracii Guns & Michael Monroe"	Tracii Guns & Michael Monroe	John 5	December 31, 2011
78	8	"Paul Rodgers & Buckcherry"	Paul Rodgers, Josh Todd and Keith Nelson	John 5	January 7, 2012
79	9	"Herman Rarebell & Andrew Dice Clay"	Herman Rarebell & Andrew Dice Clay	Chris Broderick	January 14, 2012

=== Season 10 (2012) ===
Season 10 is the first to feature a drummer as a musical guest. According to Eddie Trunk, eight out of the ten episodes were shown while two of them debuted in the next season after the VH1 Classic revised the schedule. Jason Newsted, who was originally scheduled to appear in the fifth episode, cancelled his appearance at the last minute during the taping and was replaced by the members of Warrant.

No. overall	No. in season	Title	Guest(s)	Musical Guest(s)	Original release date
80	1	"Lars Ulrich & Robb Flynn"	Lars Ulrich & Robb Flynn	Mike Portnoy	March 31, 2012
81	2	"Alice Cooper & Jack Russell"	Alice Cooper & Jack Russell	Brian Tichy	April 7, 2012
82	3	"T&N"	George Lynch, Jeff Pilson and Mick Brown	Brian Tichy	April 14, 2012
83	4	"Adrian Smith"	Adrian Smith	Michael Schenker	April 21, 2012
84	5	"Lemmy Kilmister & Warrant"	Lemmy Kilmister, Jerry Dixon and Robert Mason	Michael Schenker	April 28, 2012
85	6	"Michael Schenker & Mike McCready"	Michael Schenker & Mike McCready	Frank Hannon	May 2, 2012
86	7	"The Cult & Doro"	Ian Astbury, Billy Duffy and Doro	Frank Hannon	May 12, 2012
87	8	"Vinnie Paul & Styx"	Vinnie Paul, Tommy Shaw and James Young	Steve Stevens	May 19, 2012

=== Season 11 (2012) ===
The "David Draiman/Adrenaline Mob" and "Bobby Blotzer/L.A. Guns" episodes were originally going to be included in the previous season after both episodes were taped but were moved to Season 11 after VH1 Classic revised the Season 10 schedule. The TMS marathon premiered the season premiere as a sneak preview ahead of its August 11 premiere.

No. overall	No. in season	Title	Guest(s)	Musical Guest(s)	Original release date
88	1	"David Draiman & Adrenaline Mob"	David Draiman, Russell Allen and Mike Orlando	Mike Portnoy	July 21, 2012
89	2	"Bobby Blotzer & L.A. Guns"	Bobby Blotzer, Steve Riley and Phil Lewis	Steve Stevens	August 18, 2012
90	3	"Geoff Tate & Zakk Wylde"	Geoff Tate & Zakk Wylde	George Lynch	August 25, 2012
91	4	"Aerosmith"	Joey Kramer & Brad Whitford	George Lynch	September 1, 2012
92	5	"King Diamond & Mark Tremonti"	King Diamond & Mark Tremonti	Doug Aldrich	September 8, 2012
93	6	"Sammy Hagar & Michael Anthony"	Sammy Hagar & Michael Anthony	John 5	September 15, 2012
94	7	"Steve Harris"	Steve Harris	John 5	September 22, 2012
95	8	"Heart & Lita Ford"	Ann Wilson, Nancy Wilson and Lita Ford	Doug Aldrich	September 29, 2012

=== Season 12 (2013) ===
Several new segments were introduced with only two "Top 5" lists being debated in the series. Another new inclusion to the show is an announcer for the opening credits as well as surprise special guests appearing via satellite to chat with the hosts in the new segment "Metal Modem". This is the last season to be taped in Los Angeles before returning to New York in Season 13. Season 12 was also the only season to include the round table format.

No. overall	No. in season	Title	Guest(s)	Musical Guest(s)	Original release date
96	1	"Jason Newsted"	Jason Newsted	Carmine Appice	June 1, 2013
97	2	"Stone Sour"	Corey Taylor & Josh Rand	Richie Kotzen	June 8, 2013
98	3	"Rex Brown & Sebastian Bach"	Rex Brown & Sebastian Bach	Vinny Appice	June 15, 2013
99	4	"Jake E. Lee & Rick Allen"	Jake E. Lee & Rick Allen	Vinny Appice	June 22, 2013
100	5	"Queensrÿche & Dave Mustaine"	Scott Rockenfield, Todd La Torre and Dave Mustaine	Carmine Appice	June 29, 2013
101	6	"Rob Zombie/John 5/Tom Keifer"	Rob Zombie, John 5 and Tom Keifer	Richie Kotzen	July 6, 2013
102	7	"Black Star Riders & Neil Fallon"	Scott Gorham, Ricky Warwick and Neil Fallon	Jake E. Lee	July 13, 2013
103	8	"Buck Dharma & Kix"	Buck Dharma, Steve Whiteman and Brian Forsythe	Jake E. Lee	July 20, 2013

=== Season 13 (2014) ===
For the first time since Season 4, the series made its return to New York with episodes being taped every Tuesday at the Metropolis Studio for 12 weeks except for the last two episodes that were both filmed on the same day. This season also marks the return of "The Throwdown", "Pick of the Week" and "What's Going On With..." after they were absent in the previous season. Ace Frehley was originally supposed to appear on the same episode as Peter Criss but was unable to make it.

No. overall	No. in season	Title	Guest(s)	Musical Guest(s)	Original release date
104	1	"M. Shadows & Zakk Wylde"	M. Shadows & Zakk Wylde	Jason Hook	January 18, 2014
105	2	"Living Colour & Morgan Rose"	Corey Glover, Vernon Reid and Morgan Rose	Joel Hoekstra	January 25, 2014
106	3	"Dave Ellefson & Frank Bello"	Dave Ellefson & Frank Bello	Ron "Bumblefoot" Thal	February 1, 2014
107	4	"Ted Nugent"	Ted Nugent	Gary Hoey	February 8, 2014
108	5	"Alter Bridge & Matt Nathanson"	Mark Tremonti, Myles Kennedy and Matt Nathanson	Steve Brown	February 15, 2014
109	6	"Lamb of God"	Randy Blythe & Chris Adler	Charlie Benante	February 22, 2014
110	7	"Mick Jones & Leslie West"	Mick Jones & Leslie West	Lita Ford	March 1, 2014
111	8	"Mick Mars"	Mick Mars	Tom Keifer	March 8, 2014
112	9	"Dee Snider"	Dee Snider	Chris Caffery	March 15, 2014
113	10	"Peter Criss"	Peter Criss	Richard Christy	March 22, 2014
114	11	"The Winery Dogs & Vinnie Paul"	Mike Portnoy, Richie Kotzen, Billy Sheehan and Vinnie Paul	Yngwie Malmsteen	March 29, 2014
115	12	"Joe Satriani/Artie Lange/Jim Breuer"	Joe Satriani, Artie Lange and Jim Breuer	Yngwie Malmsteen	April 5, 2014

=== Season 14 (2015) ===
Season 14 premiered on February 21, 2015 in their new timeslot at 9/8c with a repeat airing in their former 11/10c slot. All the episodes were once again filmed on Tuesday nights at the Metropolis Studios in New York City while the ninth and tenth were both shot back-to-back. A special last-minute tribute to Twisted Sister drummer A.J. Pero, who died a week earlier on March 20, was included in the sixth episode along with an appearance by his bandmates. Despite Trunk telling the audience at the end of the season, now series finale, "We'll see you next season on That Metal Show", Season 14 proved to be the show's final season after VH1 Classic announced its decision not to renew the show for a 15th season in January 2016 a year after the airing, and before the network's re-branding to MTV Classic in August that year.

No. overall	No. in season	Title	Guest(s)	Musical Guest(s)	Original release date
116	1	"Geddy Lee"	Geddy Lee	John Petrucci	February 21, 2015
117	2	"Anthrax"	Scott Ian, Charlie Benante and Frank Bello	Alex Skolnick	February 28, 2015
118	3	"Dave Lombardo & John 5"	Dave Lombardo & John 5	John 5	March 7, 2015
119	4	"Marky Ramone/Darryl McDaniels/Gary Holt"	Marky Ramone, Darryl McDaniels and Gary Holt	Joel Hoekstra	March 14, 2015
120	5	"Jamey Jasta & Armored Saint"	Jamey Jasta, John Bush and Joey Vera	Michael Angelo Batio	March 21, 2015
121	6	"Mark Tremonti & Taylor Momsen"	Mark Tremonti & Taylor Momsen	Frank Hannon	March 28, 2015
122	7	"Chris Jericho/Max Cavalera/Billy Corgan"	Chris Jericho, Max Cavalera and Billy Corgan	Rich Ward	April 4, 2015
123	8	"Kerry King & Lzzy Hale"	Kerry King & Lzzy Hale	Zakk Wylde	April 11, 2015
124	9	"Kirk Hammett & Michael Schenker"	Kirk Hammett & Michael Schenker	Damon Johnson	April 18, 2015
125	10	"Ace Frehley & Mark Farner"	Ace Frehley & Mark Farner	Nita Strauss	April 25, 2015
126	11	"Taime Downe/Mark Slaughter/Andy Biersack"	Taime Downe, Mark Slaughter and Andy Biersack	Mike Orlando	May 2, 2015
127	12	"Bobby Blitz & Franki Banali"	Bobby Blitz & Franki Banali plus pre-recorded interview with Joe Elliot	Billy Sheehan	May 9, 2015

== Specials ==
Title	Guest(s)	Original release date
"The Best of..."	N/A	January 10, 2009
"That Metal Show Presents: Download Festival '09"	Tommy Lee, Slipknot, Hatebreed, Tesla, Mike Portnoy, Buckcherry, Duff McKagan, Tim "Ripper" Owens and many others	July 18, 2009
"That Metal Special"	Vince Neil with cameo appearances by Jake E. Lee, Frank DiMino, Ron "Bumblefoot" Thal and Chris Kael	November 11, 2012
