= Don Jamieson (comedian) =

American stand-up comedian

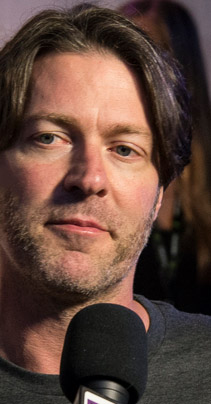
- Born: September 27, 1966 (age 58)
- Occupation(s): Stand-up comedian, television host
- Website: donjamieson.com

Donald Jamieson (born September 27, 1966) is an American stand-up comedian best known as a co-host of VH1 Classic's hit heavy metal talk show series That Metal Show, where legends of rock hang out to discuss their past and current projects in front of a live studio audience. Rolling Stone dubbed the program (which saw Jamieson teamed with radio personality Eddie Trunk and comedian Jim Florentine) one of the "50 Best Reasons to Watch TV". The show ran from November 15, 2008, through May 9, 2015, with a span of 14 seasons.

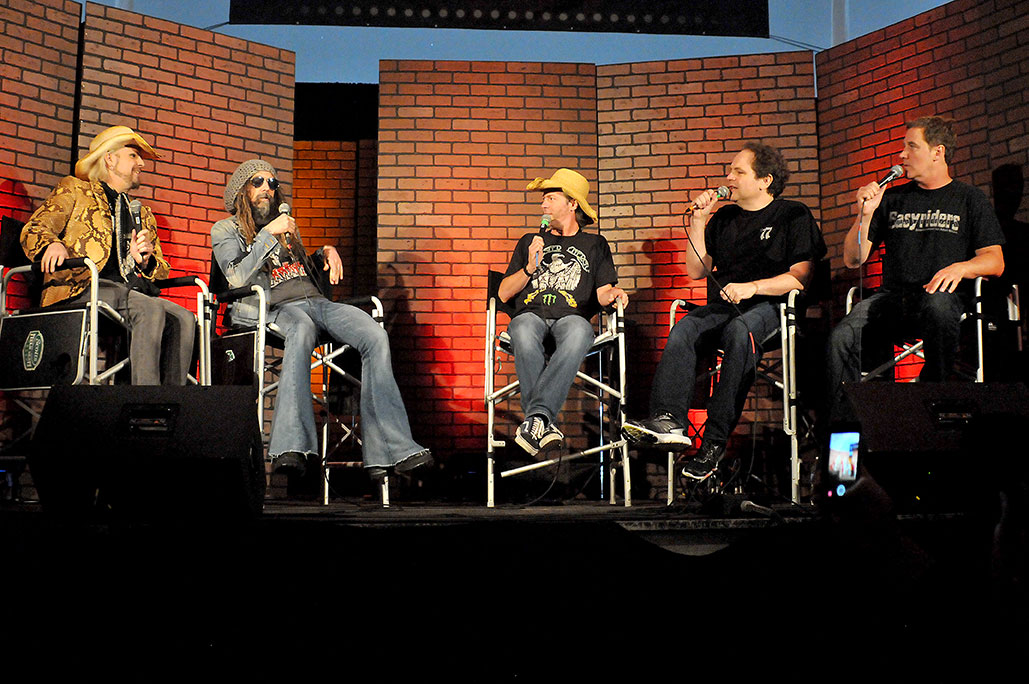
Jamieson (middle) during That Metal Show at Rock on the Range in 2016

Amongst Jamieson's many accomplishments are his three stand-up CD's Live & Hilarious, Hell Bent for Laughter, and Communication Breakdown on Metal Blade Records (all hit the Top 20 on iTunes and Top 10 on the Billboard comedy charts). He is sponsored by Monster Energy and True Religion.

Jamieson is an Emmy Award-winner for his work on HBO's Inside the NFL. Don and his long-time comedy partner, Florentine, lent their brand of humor to the popular sports show, writing producing, and performing sports-themed comedy sketches. Jamieson also co-hosted Beer Money, a fast-paced, non-traditional sports quiz show airing on SportsNet New York.

Jamieson and Florentine have also collaborated on the hidden-camera DVD and Comedy Central web series Meet The Creeps as well as a series of prank call CDs, Terrorizing Telemarketers, heard regularly on The Howard Stern Show. He is also a joke writer for comedian Lisa Lampanelli, and spent many years as Andrew Dice Clay's opening act.

He has performed at rock festivals such as Rock on the Range, Monsters of Rock Cruise, and Metallica's Orion Music + More festival where he was introduced by Metallica drummer Lars Ulrich.

Beginning in 2019, Jamieson hosts his own weekly internet show, That Jamieson Show, which is part of Compound Media (a paid-subscription platform created by Anthony Cumia), and features interviews with renowned rockers (Joe Satriani, Steel Panther, Myles Kennedy), comedians (Florentine, Joe Bartnick), plus authors and/or radio personalities (Katherine Turman, Keith Roth, Greg Prato).

In 2020, Jamieson issued his fourth comedy CD, Denim and Laughter, and planned to tour Europe with Biff Byford of Saxon, which was ultimately cancelled due to the COVID-19 pandemic. The same year, he was featured in the book A Rockin' Rollin' Man: Bon Scott Remembered.

== Discography ==
- Live & Hilarious
- Hell Bent for Laughter
- Communication Breakdown
- Denim and Laughter
