= Comedic journalism =

Form of journalism

Comedic journalism is a new form of journalism, popularized in the twenty-first century, that incorporates a comedic tone to transmit the news to mass audiences, using humour and/or satire to relay a point in news reports. Comedic journalism has been applied to print media in the past but has experienced a resurgence through the medium of television with shows such as The Daily Show, Last Week Tonight with John Oliver, and The Rick Mercer Report. Conversely, there has been much criticism about defining these media outlets as “journalism”, since some scholars believe there should be a distinction kept between comedy and journalism.

== History in Canada ==
An early example of comedic journalism in Canada is Frank magazine, founded in Nova Scotia in 1987. According to their website, Frank is a source of news, satire, opinion, comment and humour. They were inspired by the UK magazine Private Eye, which also uses satire and comedy when reporting on current affairs. Frank not only focuses on current affairs, but also existing stories long after they have disappeared from mainstream news media. Many consider the magazine to be a “scandal sheet”, a news source that should not be taken seriously. However, Frank magazine's counter-argument is that the only thing “wicked” about them is how they expose the sins of others.

In 1989, Frank magazine also started circulating in Ottawa. This version of the magazine was not as popular as the original and stopped circulation both in print and online in 2008. Publisher Michael Bates believed that the downfall of the magazine was the rise in popularity of the satirical form of journalism in the twenty-first century. He explained that they had the field of satirical journalism to themselves in the 1990s, but more publications started to pick up this form of journalism and the Ottawa magazine could no longer compete. He also mentioned the rise of the internet as a cause for the new popularity of this form of media.

== Cultural effects ==
=== Carey's transmission theory ===
James W. Carey did not believe that journalists could be defined as conveyors of information. Instead, he presented two alternate viewpoints of communication: the transmission view of communication and the ritual view of communication. The transmission view of communication highlights the importance of information being sent out over large distances in order to convey knowledge and ideas to a mass audience. This viewpoint is more commonly seen in industrial communities where focus is put on the extension of the message. Alternatively, the ritual viewpoint of communication focuses more on the sharing of information amongst a large group of people. Therefore, the focus is not on the extension of the message, but towards the maintenance of society over time. Carey argued that this viewpoint is not as prevalent in American society because the concept of culture is weak in American social thought.

Carey's transmission viewpoint of communication is evident in traditional forms of journalism because the main purpose is to report the news in an objective manner in order to transmit information to a mass audience without any external viewpoints being included. This form of journalism is very informational and acts as an instrument for disseminating news and information in a packaged format across large distances. An example of this would be daily newspapers because they are packaged and send out bits of information, their sole purpose being to transmit the news to a mass audience. Alternatively, comedic journalism employs a ritualistic viewpoint of communication in the way it presents the news. Their main focus is not just to transmit information, but to place that information in a cultural context. This form of journalism reports news in a subjective manner in order to portray the information in a particular way. Therefore, comedic journalists are able to integrate different cultural viewpoints in their reporting of the news, which creates an element of community amongst their audience.

=== Community ===
Journalist Katerina Cizek describes the importance of the relationship between journalism and community in her article “When Community and Journalism Converge”. Cizek claims that she encountered journalism only when she had come to an understanding of community. In the summer of 1990, Cizek was assigned as a photojournalist on the Oka Crisis in Ottawa. This involved a confrontation between the Canadian government and armed forces against a Mohawk community. Experiencing the event first-hand and later watching the events through news media, Cizek realized the troubling disconnect between what she was watching and what had actually occurred. The news reports did not accurately represent the views of the Mohawk community that she had witnessed. Those who did report on the community's interests were ridiculed and accused of Stockholm syndrome. Therefore, traditional news media would only accept the viewpoints of those in power and ignored the importance of the community's viewpoint.

Joy Mayer also explains the importance of this disconnect in her article, “Engaging Communities: Content and Conversation”. Mayer proposes a new element that needs to be integrated in today's journalism which is the obligation to make a connection with those they are reporting to. This stems from her issue with the separation between journalists and community. She blames this distancing on the notion of objectivity that is prevalent in traditional forms of news media. This is because journalists are forced to make a disconnection in order to report the news in a fair manner. As a result, traditional forms of news media provide only a limited and emotionless account of news events.

=== Effect of cynicism and sensationalism ===
Comedic journalism has attracted a large following, and one cause is the increasing cynicism found in and inspired by traditional news sources. Since the income of a news source is tied to their number of viewers, many news sources will do whatever it takes to gain the public's attention. This includes reporting on the information journalists and media elite genuinely think the public should know, however, this also includes alternative attention-drawing tactics such as “attack journalism,” portraying politics as “endlessly adversarial,” and contributing to a “feeding frenzy,” or excessive press coverage of an embarrassing or scandalous subject. Scandals and drama are effective in drawing viewers, but facing negative topics or the sensational reporting style again and again can frustrate viewers. The comedic, satirical portrayal of happenings in comedy news sources can offer an alternative method of receiving news, one that is frequently received in a positive light due to its entertaining qualities. This in turn has enabled comedic journalism to not just survive in the competitive world of news coverage, but to thrive in drawing significant audiences. With the range of their voice, the influential capability of comedic journalism grows.

=== As satire ===
Joe Hale Cutbirth in his article “Satire as Journalism: The Daily Show and American Politics at the Turn of the Twenty-First Century” explains the recent popularity of satirical journalism and relates this to the sense of community that viewers feel through this form of journalism. In comparison to traditional forms of news media, which are objective and authoritative, current forms of news media have evolved with popularity due to an independent and personal voice that is reporting the news to viewers with tools such as comedy and satire. Cutbirth uses the example of The Daily Show with Jon Stewart, where news events are reported in a satirical manner by comedian Jon Stewart. Through his form of news reporting, audiences are able to make a connection to the news he is reporting on and feel as though their concerns and values are being incorporated in the news. Stewart is using comedy as a form of communication which provides the audience with a sense of emotion that they do not get with traditional news media. Cutbirth also raises Carey's argument on the significance of journalism for the public sphere. He argues that if news sources only reflect the interests of few (usually the elites in society), people will not involve themselves in public life. Therefore, by Stewart's integration of different viewpoints and emotions on news events, his viewers feel they can relate to Stewart and others who are also following his show, creating a sense of community and integration into public life.

== Examples ==
The following three television shows can be viewed as modern examples of comedic journalism. The hosts of these shows report on current news events, using a comedic tone to highlight the issues that the audience should take away from the reports.

=== The Daily Show with Jon Stewart ===
The Daily Show with Jon Stewart started in January 1999, when Jon Stewart took over the hosting position from Craig Kilborn. The show was presented as a comedy show where news was reported in a satirical manner, mocking the way it was originally presented and reported in traditional forms of news media. Stewart has long denied considering himself a journalist and claims that his show reports on “fake news”. However, studies have shown that many young adults rely on his show for political information. In one survey, Stewart was voted the most trusted news source in the United States. The satirical nature of his show has exposed flaws in the objective news reporting of traditional media. As a result, audiences have turned to Stewart for a more intellectual and emotional account of news, which was lacking in their experience with traditional news media. Geoffrey Baym also argues that The Daily Show is not “fake news”, but a new form of journalism that draws on the genres of news, comedy, and television talk shows in order to report in a critical and democratic manner.

In Season 15, Episode 161, Stewart invites four 9/11 first responders onto the show, all of whom were dying as a result of their involvement during 9/11. Stewart speaks to the men about the Bill that was being passed to add health related funds for people involved in 9/11. Before their appearance on this show, the Republicans were still deciding if the law should be passed. Although Stewart reported this news in a humorous manner, this form of journalism had such an impact that the Republicans felt “embarrassed” by what was shown on his show and passed the law. In a New York Times article written about this episode, Stewart is compared to Edward R. Murrow, a famous journalist in the past, legitimizing him as a journalist.

The Daily Show with Jon Stewart ended in 2015 and replaced with The Daily Show with Trevor Noah.

=== The Colbert Report ===
The Colbert Report started in October 2005 with Stephen Colbert as the host, writer and executive producer of the show. Like Stewart, Colbert reports the news in a satirical manner, focusing on political news. He uses different segments in his episodes such as, “Tip of the Hat, Wag of the Finger” and “Bears and Balls”. During these segments, Colbert discusses current news events and does not hold back from sharing his opinion on the stories. As he puts it in one episode, he not only gives his audience his two cents worth, but a whole bag of quarters. The cheers of the audience as he reports these segments illuminates the feelings of a community because the viewer knows there is a group of people who are laughing at Colbert along with themselves. Also, his high strung attitude in his reports creates a feeling of passion with the stories he is reporting on, causing the audience to have a deeper emotional connection with the news events that he reports on.

In season five of The Colbert Report, Colbert launched his series of “Operation Iraqi Stephen: Going Commando” where he taped his shows in Iraq and became the first TV show in US history to produce shows in a combat zone. Although the title of the series is comedic, Colbert pushes the limit of journalism and gives his viewers a closer look at one of the most prevalent current affairs in the United States. He was bothered by the fact that the economic crisis in the United States had become the prevalent issue in the news. Not only did he start reporting on the War in Iraq more frequently, but actually reported on-scene in order to give his audience a deeper connection to the issue at hand.

Colbert Report ended on December 18, 2014, when Stephen Colbert became the host of The Late Show with Stephen Colbert.

=== The Rick Mercer Report ===
Like Stewart and Colbert, Mercer reports current events in Canada in a satirical manner on The Rick Mercer Report. The show takes the connection of comedic journalism and community a step further by incorporating forms of investigative journalism. Mercer frequently travels around Canada and uses techniques of investigative journalism to report on a wide range of topics. Mercer details his travels in his book, Rick Mercer Report: The Book, and also discusses certain political current events that were occurring at the time of each episode. For example, Mercer travelled with the different political parties during their election campaigns in order to gain a personal account of the event. Although Mercer focuses on political events, he also covers many other issues that Canadians can relate to, such as environmental and economic issues.

During the 2011 federal elections, Mercer urged youth to become politically active and give themselves a voice by voting. After his show aired, students from the University of Guelph created a “vote mob”, advocating for issues they believed affected their age group, such as harsh drug laws and lowering tuition fees. The vote mob was also created to encourage students at other universities to do the same. The low number of young voters has continued to be a problem in elections over the years, regardless of the number of reports that have previously been done. However, with Rick Mercer's form of comedic journalism, he was successful in making a connection with these young voters and pushing them to make a change.

=== Last Week Tonight with John Oliver ===
John Oliver was a long-time correspondent on the Daily Show with Jon Stewart. During the summer of 2013 he hosted the Daily Show while Jon Stewart was filming Rosewater. Last Week Tonight with John Oliver started in April 2014.

== The debate on comedic journalism: can it be defined as journalism? ==
There are critiques of comedic journalism, as some scholars and journalists argue that comedy cannot be seen as a valid form of journalism. They stress the importance of traditional news media and its objective nature in reporting the news. Ed Fouhy, a retired producer and network executive, claims that comedic journalism cannot be viewed as a serious source of information. Robert Thompson, director of a popular culture program at Syracuse University, adds that journalists should be more concerned with providing correct information than appealing to a younger audience and trying to be more “hip”.

However, comedic journalists use these traditional news forms to gather their information and report it in a more subjective manner. The news stories they report on are the same stories reported by mainstream news media; however, comedic journalism reports them in a different way. Having the same news reported with a different tone is something many people are starting to prefer; as Cutbirth mentions in his article, many people would rather turn to these new forms of media because of the personal and subjective viewpoints they give. This is demonstrated by a study in which American citizens voted Jon Stewart their most trusted news source. Viewers seem more trusting of their sources when they feel an emotional connection to the news reports.

One article in the American Journalism Review suggests that mainstream media can actually learn from the journalistic form of Jon Stewart. Professor Brown, chair of the communications department at Syracuse University and an associate professor of broadcast journalism, was once a skeptic of Stewart's form of comedy journalism, which he referred to as "silly riffing". However, at the start of the war in Iraq, Brown felt as though the traditional form of journalism in the mainstream media was not providing a fair account of the event. He claims that they were, “swallowing the administration’s spin rather than challenging it”. Stewart, on the other hand, was successful in covering the stories with various viewpoints in mind and therefore, steered closer to the truth than the mainstream journalists.

Phil Rosenthal, a media columnist for the Chicago Tribune, draws on the fact that a big part of the news nowadays is the managing of the news. Comedic journalists such as Stewart and Colbert not only expose the subjects in the news stories, but also how the stories were delivered in the mainstream media. They often show clips of reporters conveying the news stories and mock the information that was provided. This highlights the tension between traditional journalism and this new form that has captured such a large audience. However, bearing in mind that the news from these comedic reports are derived from traditional news sources, Fouhy and others make a valid point that people need the resources for serious news and that people also need comedic journalism to help them sort out truths. Therefore, although comedic journalism is a newer form of journalism, it can work side-by-side with traditional forms for viewers to receive a more complete account of the news.
