= Chrissie Mayr =

American comedian and YouTuber

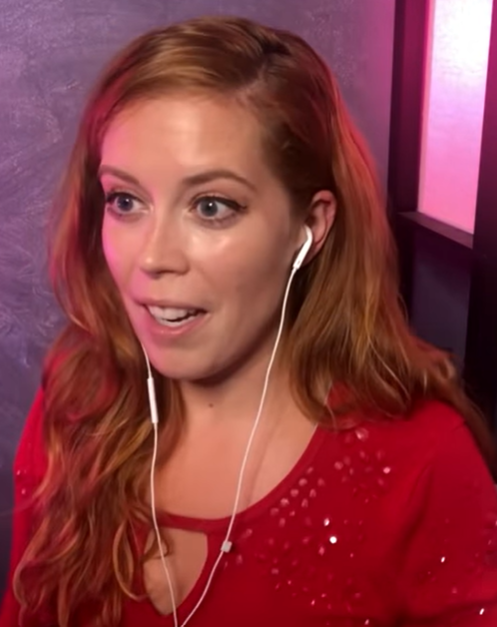
- Mayr in 2021
- Born: New York, U.S.
- Occupations: Stand-up comedian; entertainer; YouTuber
- Spouse: Frank Pellegrino (m. 2023)
- Children: 1

YouTube information
- Channel: Chrissie Mayr
- Years active: 2008–present
- Subscribers: 97.8 thousand
- Views: 23.0 million
- Last updated: November 9, 2026
- Website: www.chrissiemayr.com

Christine Mayr is an American stand-up comedian, internet entertainer and YouTuber.

== Biography ==
Mayr is a native of Rockville Centre, New York. While in college she had an internship with the television show Late Night with Conan O’Brien. She was associated with Upright Citizens Brigade and Magnet Theater, and by 2016, was producing shows at comedy clubs including Comedy at Stonewall. She was on Amazon Prime's show Comics Watching Comics and won in the fifth season. She has hosted a podcast called The Wet Spot on Compound Media, and another podcast called Chrissie Mayr Podcast.

In 2021, an article in The New Republic examining Compound Media, birthplace of the Proud Boys, said Mayr had "delved deep into QAnon conspiracy theories—believing and spreading them, that is—and attended the protests at Capitol Hill on January 6". Interviewed on a podcast by Megyn Kelly, Mayr said of the January 6 events, "I was there and anybody who was there on the 6th is, like, blown away by how, like, inaccurate the media coverage is." She told a newspaper that she planned to release a comedy album on the January 6 anniversary.

== Appearances ==
- Fox network's shows Laughs and Punchline
- The Wendy Williams Show
- Reelz
- The Chris Gethard Show
- The Travel Channel
- What Not To Wear
- The News and Why it Matters w/ Sara Gonzales
- Prime Time with Alex Stein
- Gutfeld!
- Compound Media
- TimCast IRL
- America's Got Talent
- The Megyn Kelly Show
- Holly Randall Unfiltered
