= Jim Florentine =

American actor (born 1964)

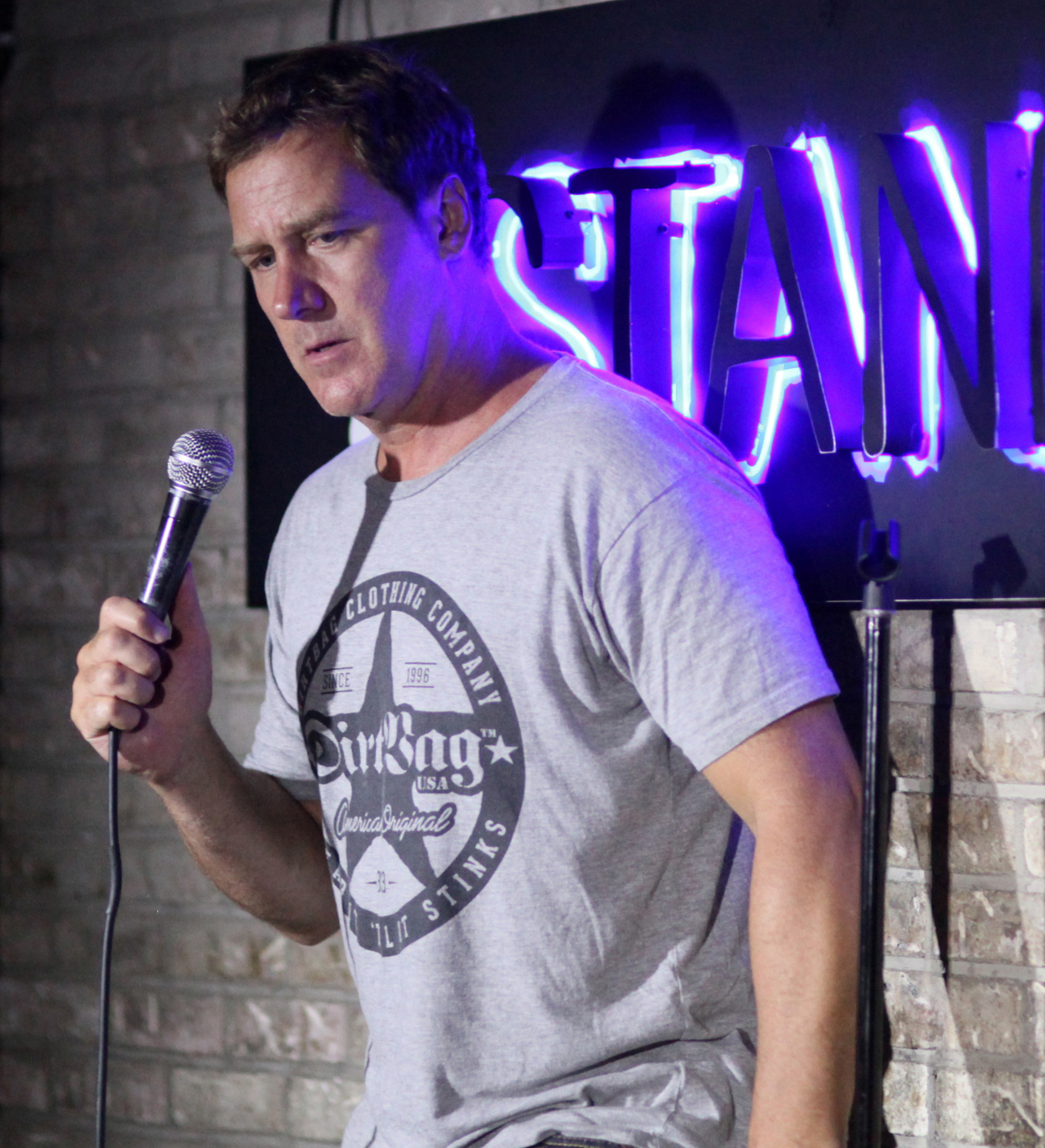
- Florentine performing in 2016
- Born: James Bernard Florentine; August 18, 1964 (age 62); Brooklyn, New York, U.S.
- Spouse: Samantha Warner (m. 2012; div. 2015)
- Children: 1

Comedy career
- Years active: 1993–present
- Medium: Comedy, film, television
- Genre: Comedy
- Website: jimflorentine.com

James Bernard Florentine (born August 18, 1964) is an American comedian, actor, author, and television personality. He is best known for co-hosting That Metal Show on VH1 Classic and voicing several characters on Crank Yankers, including Special Ed and Bobby Fletcher. He hosts The Jim Florentine Show on Sirius XM Satellite Radio and a podcast called Everybody Is Awful (Except You). He has released six albums of stand-up comedy, two comedy specials, eight installments in the Terrorizing Telemarketers prank call compilation, and three installments of the Meet the Creeps hidden camera show. His 2018 book Everybody is Awful (Except You!) reached No. 1 on the Book Soup nonfiction chart.

== Early life ==
He was born on August 18, 1964, in Brooklyn (New York) to a large Catholic family. He has six brothers and sisters and launched his career in New York City comedy clubs.

== Personal life ==
Florentine is a native of central New Jersey. He came from a large Catholic family and was one of the seven children who attended the Catholic school, St Ambrose. He has stated in various interviews and in his stand-up act that he disliked his religious upbringing. Florentine was interested in a musical career growing up because of his love for heavy metal music, but would often joke that he never had the talent to play an instrument.

His family lived for several years in Fort Lauderdale, Florida when his father decided he wanted to set up a family-run hot dog vending business. The business, however, proved unsuccessful, and the family moved back to New Jersey. In his late teens, Florentine had drug and alcohol problems and was in and out of rehab. He has stated his love of hard rock music set him on a straight path in life. Florentine became a DJ on WCNJ (now WCNM), his college radio station in Hazlet, New Jersey, in the 1980s.

Florentine was inspired to do stand-up comedy after seeing Andrew Dice Clay for the first time on a Rodney Dangerfield comedy special. He and Jim Norton met Dice backstage at The Comedy Store in Los Angeles in the late 90s, and the three hit it off, with Florentine and Norton later becoming his opening acts.

Jade, his girlfriend of six years, committed suicide in December 2006 while he was away performing on stage. In August 2007, while a guest on The Howard Stern Show, Jim Florentine asked co-host Robin Quivers to go on a date with him during a show segment. Due to the attention this garnered, Quivers became tight-lipped about the topic. On July 28, 2008, Quivers announced on the radio show that she and Florentine had ended their relationship, the breakup was amicable, Florentine was "genuine and honest," and that he was the one who initiated the breakup. In 2010, he had a child with lacrosse coach Samantha Warner. The two married in 2012 (her third, his first) and divorced in 2015 after he hired a private investigator who caught Warner having sex with a New Jersey police officer.

== Career ==
In July 2001, Florentine released Terrorizing Telemarketers Volume 1. After numerous plays on the Howard Stern Radio Show, his CD ranking on Amazon.com went from 282,363 to number 2. The only artist ahead of him was the Backstreet Boys. Later that week, Florentine's CD came in at No. 17 on the Internet Billboard charts.

After the release of Terrorizing Telemarketers Volume 2 in late 2001, Jimmy Kimmel and Adam Carolla took a liking to Florentine's prank calls and hired him for a show to debut in June 2002 on Comedy Central called Crank Yankers. Florentine played Special Ed, a developmentally disabled teenager, and Bobby Fletcher, a despicable, alcoholic slob who is the older cousin of Ed.

After season 1, Eminem took a liking to Florentine's characters and flew him out to his Detroit studio to do prank calls together for the upcoming season of Crank Yankers. The following year in 2004, Eminem and Florentine did a bit together on the MTV Music Awards show where Eminem beat up Special Ed, who kept annoying him (and tore his leg off). Crank Yankers lasted three seasons on Comedy Central. The show moved over to MTV2 in 2006 for one season. Florentine's Special Ed character that he created is still played at various sporting events at stadiums across the USA.

Florentine was featured on the series premiere of Down and Dirty with Jim Norton, a comedy series that aired on HBO on October 3, 2008. The series spotlights new and established talent, including Artie Lange, Bill Burr (Chappelle Show), Patrice O'Neal, and Andrew Dice Clay. Lemmy, leader of the heavy metal band Motörhead, served as the musical director.

Later that year, That Metal Show made its debut on VH1 Classic. Florentine co-hosted the show with fellow comedian Don Jamieson and rock radio broadcaster Eddie Trunk. The show discussed various topics in the hard rock and metal community, along with interviewing musicians and giveaways for the audience. The show ended production in 2015.

Florentine has been seen on The Apprentice, Comedy Central's Mother Load, HBO's Inside the NFL, The Late Late Show with Craig Kilborn, The Opie and Anthony Show, Opie with Jim Norton, The Howard Stern Show, Spike TV's Video Game Awards, MTV Music Video Awards, Jimmy Kimmel Live!, Last Call with Carson Daly, Tough Crowd with Colin Quinn on Comedy Central, VH1's The List, Louie Anderson's Comedy Showcase, Jim Norton and Sam Roberts on Sirius/XM and Comedy Central's @midnight. He also voiced the redneck radio host Bobbie Ray in the video game Grand Theft Auto: Vice City Stories.

He has a series of prank call CDs known as Terrorizing Telemarketers Volumes 1–8. The CDs feature a series of recorded telephone conversations, often with Florentine receiving calls from telemarketers, wherein he turns the tables on often aggressive salespeople by being deliberately difficult and creating awkward situations.

In 2004, he worked one season on HBO's Inside the NFL performing various comedy sketches. The show won an Emmy that season and Florentine has proudly said in various interviews that when he was single, he kept it on his nightstand, and it would close the deal anytime he had a date over. He called it his "Mariano Rivera".

At the same time, Florentine released two hidden camera DVDs named Meet The Creeps, where he and his partner Don Jamieson pulled outrageous pranks on people. The DVDs fell into the hands of some Comedy Central executives, who then brought Meet The Creeps to their broadband channel called Motherload. After two successful seasons, Comedy Central created a Meet The Creeps pilot for the network. However, the pilot was deemed too mean-spirited, and the show never made it on the network.

Between 2004 and 2008, he made three appearances on Jimmy Kimmel Live! on ABC. He also appeared on The Late Late Show Craig Kilborn. In 2007, Florentine appeared on the last episode of The Apprentice in season 4 doing his edgy stand-up comedy at a conservative charity event. He asked Trump's partner George if he wears a diaper. He has not appeared on The Apprentice since.

He was an occasional guest on the late-night Fox News Channel show Red Eye w/ Greg Gutfeld, and often appears on Gutfeld!.

Later in 2010, Florentine appeared in the feature film A Little Help as Brian.

In 2011, Florentine launched his weekly podcast called Comedy, Metal, Midgets. It is one of the most popular comedy podcasts landing in the top 20 every week.

On October 25, 2011, Florentine released his stand-up CD on Metal Blade Records called Cringe N Purge. It landed at No. 3 on the iTunes charts and No. 5 on the Comedy Billboard Charts.

In June 2012, Florentine hosted the OMA Awards for MTV, which aired worldwide. In August 2012, That Metal Show that Jim co-hosts on VH1 Classic will be going into its 11th season. Florentine also opened for the band Metallica at the Orionfest festival which attracted over 50,000 fans.

On September 4, 2012, Florentine released his second CD on Metal Blade Records called Awful Jokes From My First Comedy Notebook. The CD also landed at No. 3 on the iTunes Charts and No. 10 on the Comedy Billboard Charts. Jim is only the third comedian ever to have two CDs land in the top 10 in the same year. The concept for this CD was that Jim stumbled across his first comedy notebooks from when he started doing comedy back in the early 1990s. He could not believe how bad his early jokes were and decided to share them with his fans and went into a recording studio and read his awful jokes directly out of his notebook. The CD has received critical acclaim in the comedy world for taking a huge risk.

On April 17, 2013, radio personality Marc Maron posted a lengthy interview with Florentine on his WTF podcast series.

He was also on Californication, Girls, and Inside Amy Schumer.

In 2015, Jim was on the season finale of Louie and was submitted for an Emmy nomination for "Best Guest Star."

In 2016, he released two comedy specials, I'm Your Savior was a critically acclaimed one-man show about his life and the death of his ex-girlfriend. His second special released the same year, A Simple Man, debuted at number one on the comedy charts.

== Filmography ==
Year	Film	Role	Notes
1998	White Chicks, Incorporated	Bill	
2002	Rock Bottom	Miller Davis	
2003	Secret War	Getty	
2004	Grace and the Storm	Gio	
2005	Eminem's Making the Ass	Special Ed / Little Em'	Voice only
2006	Beer League	Crispino	
2010	A Little Help	Brian	
2015	Trainwreck	One-Night Stand Guy	

== Television work ==
Year	Film	Role	Notes
1997	Apt. 2F	Comic	Episode: "Full of Whit"
2002–2007, 2019–2022	Crank Yankers	Special Ed / Bobby Fletcher (voices)	70 episodes
2008–2015	That Metal Show	Himself	Co-host
2013–2014	Inside Amy Schumer	Various	4 episodes
2013	Aqua Teen Hunger Force	Unnamed unseen manager (voice)	Episode: "Working Stiffs"
2013	Behind the Music: Remastered	Himself	Episode: "Motörhead"
2014	Californication	Jim / The Pimp	2 episodes
2014	Girls	Man on the Street	Episode: "Role-Play"
2015	Louie	Kenny	Episode: "The Road: Part 2"
2015	Red Oaks	Cop	Episode "Swingers"

== Video games ==
- Grand Theft Auto: Vice City Stories .... Bobbie Ray (2006)

== Discography ==
- Terrorizing Telemarketers I (2001) (CD)
- Terrorizing Telemarketers II (2001) (CD)
- Terrorizing Telemarketers III (2002) (CD)
- Terrorizing Telemarketers IV (2004) (CD)
- Get The Kids Out Of The Room (2005) (CD)
- Anger's A Gift (2008) (CD)
- Terrorizing Telemarketers V (2009) (CD)
- Cringe & Purge (2011) (CD)
- Awful Jokes From My First Comedy Notebook (2012) (CD)
- Terrorizing Telemarketers VI (2015) (CD)
- I'm Your Savior (2016) (DVD/CD)
- A Simple Man (2016) (DVD)
- I Got The House (2019) (DVD/CD)
- Bite The Bullet (2022) (CD)
- Terrorizing Telemarketers VII (2022) (CD)
- Terrorizing Telemarketers VIII (2026) (CD)

=== DVDs ===
- Meet The Creeps Volume 1 (DVD)
- Meet The Creeps Volume 2 (DVD)
- Meet The Creeps Volume 3 (DVD)
