= Gavin McInnes =

Canadian far-right commentator

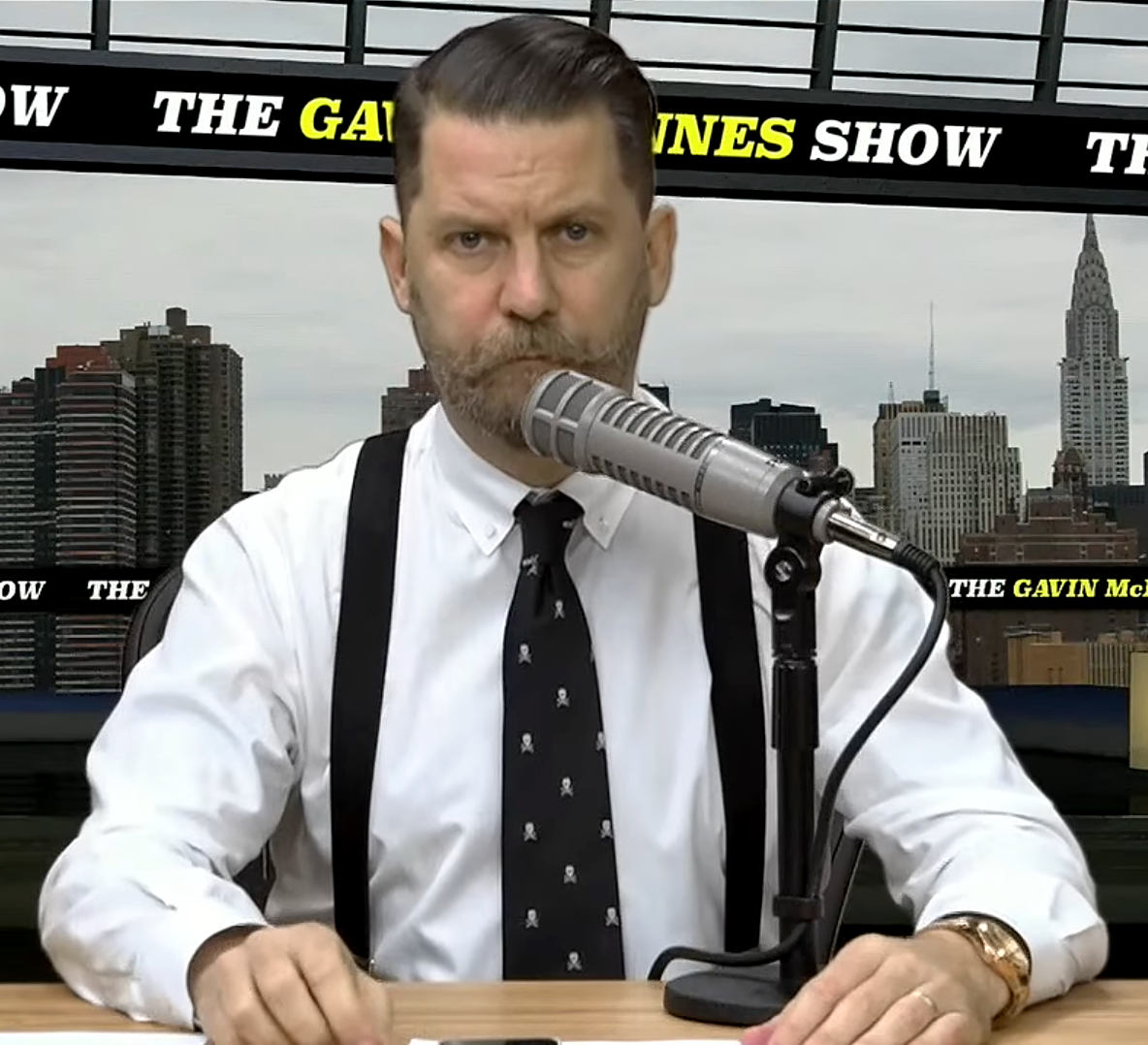
- McInnes hosting The Gavin McInnes Show in 2015
- Born: Gavin Miles McInnes; 17 July 1970 (age 56); Hitchin, Hertfordshire, England
- Education: Carleton University (BA)
- Occupations: Writer; podcast host; political commentator; actor
- Known for: Co-founder of Vice magazine Founder of the Proud Boys; Founder of Censored.TV (now Compound Censored)
- Movement: Hipsterism; Far-right
- Spouse: Emily Jendrisak (m. 2005)
- Children: 3
- Website: Compound Censored

Gavin Miles McInnes (/məˈkɪnɪs/; born 17 July 1970) is a Canadian writer, podcaster, far-right commentator and founder of the Proud Boys. He is the host of Get Off My Lawn with Gavin McInnes on his website, Compound Censored. He co-founded Vice magazine in 1996 and relocated to the United States in 2001. In 2016 he founded the Proud Boys, an American far-right militant organization which is designated as a terrorist group in Canada and New Zealand after he left the group. McInnes has been described as promoting violence against political opponents but has argued that he has only supported political violence in self-defense and that he is not far-right or a supporter of fascism, instead identifying as "a fiscal conservative and libertarian".

Born to Scottish parents in Hertfordshire, England, McInnes emigrated to Canada as a child. He graduated from Carleton University in Ottawa before moving to Montreal and co-founding Vice with Suroosh Alvi and Shane Smith. He relocated with Vice Media to New York City in 2001. During his time at Vice, McInnes was called a leading figure in the New York hipster subculture. He holds both Canadian and British citizenship and lives in Larchmont, New York.

In 2018, McInnes was fired from Blaze Media and banned from Twitter, Facebook, and Instagram for violating terms of use related to promoting violent extremist groups and hate speech. In June 2020, McInnes's account was suspended from YouTube for violating YouTube's policies concerning hate speech by posting content "glorifying [and] inciting violence against another person or group of people."

== Early life ==
Gavin Miles McInnes was born on 17 July 1970 in Hitchin, Hertfordshire, England, the son of Scottish parents James McInnes, who later became the Vice-President of Operations at Gallium Visual Systems Inc. – a Canadian defence company – and Loraine McInnes, a retired business teacher. His family migrated to Canada when McInnes was four, settling in Ottawa, Ontario. He attended Ottawa's Earl of March Secondary School. As a teen, McInnes played in an Ottawa punk band called Anal Chinook. He graduated from Carleton University.

== Career ==
=== Vice Media (1994–2007) ===
McInnes joined Voice magazine (later Voice of Montreal) in 1994 as assistant editor and cartoonist, under editor Suroosh Alvi. The magazine was established by Interimages Communications under a job creation program of the Quebec government to allow social welfare recipients to gain work experience. It focused on Montreal's alternative cultural scene, including music, art, trends and drug culture, to compete with the already established Montreal Mirror. Alvi, McInnes and Shane Smith bought the magazine from the publisher and changed the magazine's name to Vice in 1996.

Richard Szalwinski, a Canadian software millionaire, acquired the magazine and relocated the operation to New York City in the late 1990s.

During McInnes's tenure he was described as the "godfather" of hipsterdom by WNBC and as "one of hipsterdom's primary architects" by AdBusters. He occasionally contributed articles to Vice, including "The VICE Guide to Happiness" and "The VICE Guide to Picking Up Chicks", and co-authored two Vice books: The Vice Guide to Sex and Drugs and Rock and Roll, and Vice Dos and Don'ts: 10 Years of VICE Magazine's Street Fashion Critiques.

In an interview in the New York Press in 2002, McInnes said that he was pleased that most Williamsburg hipsters were white. McInnes later wrote in a letter to Gawker that the interview was done as a prank intended to ridicule "baby boomer media like The Times". After he became the focus of a letter-writing campaign by a black reader, Vice apologized for McInnes's comments. McInnes was featured in a 2003 New York Times article about Vice magazine; McInnes' political views were described by the Times as "closer to a white supremacist's."

In 2006, he was featured in The Vice Guide to Travel with actor and comedian David Cross in China. He left Vice in 2008 due to what he described as "creative differences". In a 2013 interview with The New Yorker, McInnes said his split with Vice was about the increasing influence of corporate advertising on Vice's content, stating that "Marketing and editorial being enemies had been the business plan".

=== After Vice (2008–2018) ===
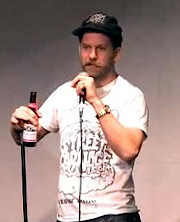
McInnes at SXSW 2008

After leaving Vice in 2008, McInnes became increasingly known for far-right political views.

In 2008, McInnes created the website StreetCarnage.com. He also co-founded an advertising agency called Rooster where he served as creative director.

McInnes was featured in season 3 of the Canadian reality TV show Kenny vs. Spenny, as a judge in the "Who is Cooler?" episode. In 2010, McInnes was approached by Adult Swim and asked to play the part of Mick, an anthropomorphic Scottish soccer ball, in the short-lived Aqua Teen Hunger Force spin-off Soul Quest Overdrive. After losing a 2010 pilot contest to Cheyenne Cinnamon and the Fantabulous Unicorn of Sugar Town Candy Fudge, six episodes of Soul Quest Overdrive were ordered, with four airing in Adult Swim's 4 AM DVR Theater block on 25 May 2011 before quickly being cancelled. McInnes jokingly blamed the show's cancellation on the other cast members (Kristen Schaal, David Cross, and H. Jon Benjamin) not being "as funny" as him.

McInnes wrote a column for Taki's Magazine, beginning around 2011, that made casual use of racial and anti-gay slurs, as described by the Southern Poverty Law Center (SPLC).

McInnes has also written columns for American Renaissance, a white supremacist magazine.

In 2012, McInnes wrote a memoir book called How to Piss in Public. In 2013 he directed The Brotherhood of the Traveling Rants, a documentary on his tour as an occasional standup comedian. For the film, he faked a serious car accident. Also that year, McInnes starred in the independent film How to Be a Man, which premiered at Sundance Next Weekend. He has also played supporting roles in other films including Creative Control (2015) and One More Time (2015).

In August 2014, McInnes was asked to take an indefinite leave of absence as chief creative officer of Rooster, following online publication at Thought Catalog of an essay about transphobia titled "Transphobia is Perfectly Natural" that sparked a call to boycott the company. In response, Rooster issued a statement, saying in part: "We are extremely disappointed with his actions and have asked that he take a leave of absence while we determine the most appropriate course of action."

In June 2015, broadcaster Anthony Cumia announced that McInnes would be hosting a show on his network, therefore retiring the Free Speech podcast that he had started in March. The Gavin McInnes Show premiered on Compound Media on 15 June. McInnes is a former contributor to Canadian far-right portal The Rebel Media and a regular on conspiracy theorist media platform Infowars' The Alex Jones Show, and Fox News' Red Eye, The Greg Gutfeld Show, and The Sean Hannity Show.

In 2016, he founded the Proud Boys, a neo-fascist, men's rights and male-only organisation classified as a "general hate" organization by the SPLC. He has rejected this classification, claiming that the group is "not an extremist group and [does] not have ties with white nationalists".

McInnes left Rebel News in August 2017, declaring that he was going to be "a multi-media Howard Stern-meets-Tucker Carlson". He later joined CRTV, an online television network launched by Conservative Review. The debut episode of his new show Get Off My Lawn aired on 22 September 2017.

=== Events in 2018 ===
On 10 August 2018, McInnes' Twitter account, as well as the account for the Proud Boys, was permanently suspended by Twitter due to their rules against violent extremist groups. The suspension was ahead of the first anniversary of the Unite the Right rally in Charlottesville, Virginia, and the small Unite the Right 2 Washington protest in August 2018 in which the Proud Boys participated.

On 12 October 2018, at the Metropolitan Republican Club, McInnes participated in a reenactment of the 1960 assassination of socialist politician Inejiro Asanuma by 17-year-old right-wing ultranationalist Otoya Yamaguchi during a televised debate. After the event, a contingent of Proud Boys were caught on tape beating a protester outside the venue, after a leftist protester threw a plastic bottle at them.

On 21 November 2018, shortly after news broke that the FBI had reportedly classified the Proud Boys as an extremist group with ties to white nationalists, McInnes said that his lawyers had advised him that quitting might help the nine members being prosecuted for the incidents in October and he said "this is 100% a legal gesture, and it is 100% about alleviating sentencing", and said it was a "'stepping down gesture', in quotation marks". Two weeks later the Special Agent in Charge of the FBI's Oregon office said that it had not been their intent to label the entire group as "extremist", only to characterize the possible threat from certain members of the group that way.

Later that month, McInnes was planning on travelling to Australia for a speaking tour with Milo Yiannopoulos and Tommy Robinson (Stephen Yaxley-Lennon's pseudonym), but was informed by Australian immigration authorities that "he was judged to be of bad character" and would be denied a visa to enter the country. Issuing a visa to McInnes was opposed by an online campaign called "#BanGavin", which collected 81,000 signatures.

On 3 December 2018, Conservative Review Television (CRTV), on which McInnes had hosted the Get Off My Lawn program, merged with BlazeTV, the television arm of Glenn Beck's TheBlaze, to become Blaze Media. McInnes was expected to host his program for the new company, whose co-president called McInnes "a comedian and provocateur, one of the many varied voices and viewpoints on Blaze Media platforms." Less than a week later, on 8 December, it was announced that McInnes was no longer associated with Blaze Media, with no details given as to why.

Two days later, on 10 December, McInnes, who had previously been banned by Amazon, PayPal, Twitter, and Facebook, was banned from YouTube for "multiple third-party claims of copyright infringement." Asked to comment about his firing and bannings, McInnes said that he had been victimized by "lies and propaganda", and that "there has been a concerted effort to de-platform me." In his e-mail to Huffington Post, McInnes stated that "Someone very powerful decided long ago that I shouldn't have a voice ... I'm finally out of platforms and unable to defend myself. ... We are no longer living in a free country." McInnes also indicated some personal responsibility for the situation in an interview on the ABC News program Nightline, saying. "I'm not guilt free in this. There's culpability there. I shouldn't have said, you know, violence solves everything or something like that without making the context clear and I regret saying things like that." McInnes stopped short of apologizing or actually retracting his past statements, saying, "That ship has sailed."

==== Larchmont lawn sign controversy ====
In reaction to the Proud Boys fight in October 2018, residents of the suburban Westchester community of Larchmont, where McInnes lives, began a "Hate Has No Home Here" campaign, which involved displaying that slogan on lawn signs around the community. One resident said "We stand together as a community, and violence and hate are not tolerated here." Several days after the signs began appearing, McInnes' wife sent emails to their neighbours saying that the media had misrepresented McInnes.

Amy Siskind, an activist and writer who lives in nearby Mamaroneck, posted on Facebook that she was planning an anti-hate vigil. After a local newspaper ran a story about it, McInnes and his family appeared at Siskind's door without invitation or forewarning; she called the police.

At the end of December, with the lawn sign campaign still ongoing, McInnes wrote a letter which was dropped off at the homes of his neighbours. In it, he asked them to take down their signs, and described himself as "a pro-gay, pro-Israel, virulently anti-racist libertarian," saying that there was nothing "hateful, racist, homophobic, anti-Semitic or intolerant" in "any of my expressions of my worldview," contrary to his past remarks, such as saying he was "becoming anti-Semitic" after a trip to Israel, or referring to transgender people as "gender niggers". McInnes said that the Proud Boys was a "drinking club [he] started several years ago as a joke". Despite the letter's formality, in a podcast on 4 January 2019, McInnes called the neighbours "assholes", described their behaviour as "cunty" and said "If you have that sign on your lawn, you're a fucking retard."

One Larchmont resident said about him: "I don't care what Gavin says, I've done my research ... He incites violence. He spouts divisive, racist language. And while he may try to say he disowns his followers, he's a part of the problem. So when I read his letter, I was like, yeah, right, this is ridiculous."

Several days after the letter was sent out, HuffPost reported that they had viewed evidence provided by some neighbours that McInnes' wife, Emily – who identifies as a liberal Democrat – had harassed and intimidated them, including with the threat of legal action. Her threats were such that several neighbours notified the police.

==== Lawsuit against the SPLC ====
Although McInnes cut ties with the Proud Boys publicly in November 2018, stepping down as chairman, in February 2019 he filed suit against the Southern Poverty Law Center over their designation of the Proud Boys as a "general hate" group. The defamation suit was filed in federal court in Alabama. In the papers filed, McInnes claimed that the hate group designation is false and motivated by fund-raising concerns, and that his career has been damaged by it. He claimed that SPLC contributed to his or the Proud Boys' being deplatformed by Twitter, PayPal, Mailchimp, and iTunes.

The SPLC says on its website that "McInnes plays a duplicitous rhetorical game: rejecting white nationalism and, in particular, the term 'alt-right' while espousing some of its central tenets," and that the group's "rank-and-file [members] and leaders regularly spout white nationalist memes and maintain affiliations with known extremists. They are known for anti-Muslim and misogynistic rhetoric. Proud Boys have appeared alongside other hate groups at extremist gatherings like the 'Unite the Right' rally in Charlottesville." In response to the suit, Richard Cohen, the president of SPLC, wrote "Gavin McInnes has a history of making inflammatory statements about Muslims, women, and the transgender community. The fact that he's upset with SPLC tells us that we're doing our job exposing hate and extremism."

=== Compound Censored and other ventures (2019-present) ===
==== Censored.TV and Get Off My Lawn launch ====
In 2019, McInnes launched Censored.TV, an online video platform. The platform was originally named FreeSpeech.TV, but was changed to its current title for copyright purposes. The platform features McInnes' primary show, Get Off My Lawn (GOML). GOML is a pre-recorded, daily show which airs on weekdays with Thursdays as an exception, in which the show airs live under the alternative title Get Off My Lawn Live.

In May 2021, Milo Yiannopoulos wrote on Telegram that Censored.TV is "laying off all its staff" and lacked enough funding to sustain production of Yiannopoulous' show on the platform. McInnes later dismissed these allegation whilst announcing the arrival of several new shows on his platform.

On 27 August 2022, McInnes faked his own arrest during a live broadcast of Censored.TV. In the recording, McInnes appeared to look off past the camera, before saying ""We're shooting a show, can we do this another time?" adding "I didn't let you in." McInnes then walked off the set. It was widely speculated that McInnes had been arrested, until former McInnes-ally Owen Benjamin outed McInnes by posting text messages between the two of them. "Prank. Don't tell," McInnes wrote to Benjamin. Benjamin responded, "U gonna reveal its a prank? Cuz I have friends writing blogs about it." McInnes replied "Never," adding that he "never said" the FBI had raided his studio. After being outed by Benjamin, McInnes returned to the public on 6 September 2022.

In December 2022, McInnes interviewed Kanye West and white nationalist Nick Fuentes. In the interview, McInnes claimed to be trying to save West from his own antisemitism; McInnes faulted not Jews but "liberal elites of all races", while West said Jews should forgive Adolf Hitler and predicted that antisemitism would be "awesome for a presidential campaign".

==== Compound Censored ====
In June 2024, radio personality Anthony Cumia announced that his subscription-based platform, Compound Media, was closing down, and that he was to merge his network and The Anthony Cumia Show with McInnes' Censored.TV network. The merger lead to the portmanteau renaming of Censored.TV to Compound Censored.

==== New York trial of Proud Boys ====
Although McInnes was not a defendant in the August 2019 trial of members of the Proud Boys for their part in the violence that occurred after a meeting of the Metropolitan Republican Club in October 2018, prosecutors repeatedly invoked his name, his words and his views in their questioning of the defendants, after testimony by the defendants and other Proud Boys opened the door to that line of questioning. During closing arguments, a prosecutor said that "Gavin McInnes is not a harmless satirist. He is a hatemonger," while the defense said that McInnes was being "demonized."

== Views ==
McInnes describes himself as "a fiscal conservative and libertarian" and part of the New Right, a term that he prefers rather than alt-right. The New York Times has described McInnes as a far-right provocateur. He has referred to himself as a "western chauvinist" and started a men's organization called Proud Boys who swear their allegiance to this cause.

In November 2018, it was reported on the basis of an internal memo of the Clark County, Washington Sheriff's Office – based on an FBI briefing – that the Bureau classified the Proud Boys "an extremist group with ties to white nationalism". Two weeks later, the Special Agent in Charge of the FBI's Oregon office denied that the FBI had made that designation about the entire group, ascribing it to a misunderstanding on the part of the Sheriff's Office. The SAIC, Renn Cannon, said that their intent was simply to characterize the possible threat from certain members of the group, not to classify the entire group. The Southern Poverty Law Center classifies them as a "general hate group". McInnes has said his group is not a white nationalist group.

In 2003, McInnes said, "I love being white and I think it's something to be very proud of. I don't want our culture diluted. We need to close the borders now and let everyone assimilate to a Western, white, English-speaking way of life."

In a speech given at New York University in February 2017, after a clash between the Proud Boys and antifa protestors, McInnes said: "Violence doesn't feel good, justified violence feels great, and fighting solves everything. ... I want violence. I want punching in the face." He says that he has only advocated for acting in self-defense.

In 2024, the question of how McInnes's views had evolved away from the relatively progressive values of Vice was examined in the Canadian television documentary It's Not Funny Anymore: Vice to Proud Boys.

=== Race and ethnicity ===
McInnes has been accused of racism and of promoting white supremacist rhetoric. He has used racial slurs against Susan Rice and Jada Pinkett Smith, and more widely against Palestinians and Asians. In September 2004, he told a reporter for the Chicago Reader at a party that he "wanted to fuck the shit out of [a young Asian lady] until she started talking." The reporter, Liz Armstrong, wrote: "He went on to posit that since Asians' eyes don't work so good in terms of facial expressions they have no choice but to emote with their mouths."

McInnes has said that there is a "mass conformity that black people push on each other". He is also listed as a contributor to the 2016 book Black Lies Matter which criticizes the Black Lives Matter movement. He said that New Jersey U.S. Senator Cory Booker, who is Black, is "kind of like Sambo."

=== Religion ===
==== Judaism ====
In March 2017, a group of Rebel Media hosts, including McInnes, spent a week touring Israel. On the trip, McInnes made a non-Rebel video in which he defended Holocaust deniers, blamed Jews for the Treaty of Versailles, and said he was "becoming anti-Semitic". The Times of Israel said he was "apparently drunk" in the video. Israel National News called it a "faux rant" and "intentionally offensive". He later said that his comments were taken out of context. McInnes also produced a comedic video for Rebel called "Ten Things I Hate about Jews", later retitled "Ten Things I Hate About Israel". After his statements were promoted by white supremacists (in contrast to other videos from the Rebel Media tour), McInnes publicly declined their support. Upon McInnes' return to America, Rebel Media produced a video of McInnes in which he said, "I've got tons of Nazi friends. David Duke and all the Nazis totally think I rock... No offence, Nazis, I don't want to hurt your feelings, but I don't like you. I like Jews." Rebel Media's owner, Ezra Levant, who is Jewish-Canadian, defended McInnes. In a December 2022 interview for Censored.TV with Kanye West and the white nationalist Nick Fuentes, he said he was trying to save West from antisemitism and said that "every individual I meet starts off with a clean slate".

==== Islam ====
McInnes is anti-Islam, once stating that "Muslims are stupid... the only thing they really respect is violence and being tough." He also has equated Islam with fascism, stating "Nazis are not a thing. Islam is a thing." In April 2018, McInnes labelled a significant section of Muslims as both mentally ill and incestuous, claiming that "Muslims have a problem with inbreeding. They tend to marry their first cousins... and that is a major problem [in the U.S.] because when you have mentally damaged inbreds – which not all Muslims are, but a disproportionate number are – and you have a hate book called the Koran [sic]... you end up with a perfect recipe for mass murder."

=== Gender ===
McInnes has described himself as "an Archie Bunker sexist", and has said that "95 percent of women would be happier at home". On the topic of female police officers, he said, "I understand [women] are good for domestics, but I don't understand why there are so many female police officers. They're not strong, they're like super fat police officers. It doesn't make any sense to me."

In 2003, Vanessa Grigoriadis in The New York Times quoted McInnes saying, "'No means no' is puritanism. I think Steinem-era feminism did women a lot of injustices, but one of the worst ones was convincing all these indie norts that women don't want to be dominated." McInnes has been accused of sexism by various media outlets including Chicago Sun-Times, Independent Journal Review, Salon, Jezebel, The Hollywood Reporter, and Slate. In October 2013, McInnes said during a panel interview that "people would be happier if women would stop pretending to be men" and that feminism "has made women less happy". He said, "We've trivialized childbirth and being domestic so much that women are forced to pretend to be men. They're feigning this toughness, they're miserable." A heated argument ensued with University of Miami School of Law professor Mary Anne Franks.

=== White genocide ===
McInnes has espoused the white genocide conspiracy theory, saying that white women having abortions and immigration is "leading to white genocide in the West". In 2018, regarding South African farm attacks and land reform proposals, he said that black South Africans were not "trying to get their land back – they never had that land", instead stating there were "ethnic cleansing" efforts against white South Africans.

== Filmography ==
=== Film ===
- How to Be a Man (2013) – as Mark McCarthy
- Creative Control (2015) – as Scott
- One More Time (2015) – as Record Producer
- White Noise (2020) – as Himself

=== Television ===
- Kenny vs Spenny: "Who is Cooler" episode (2006) – as himself (guest judge)
- Soul Quest Overdrive (2010, 2011) – as Mick (voice)
- Vice Guide to Travel (2006) – as himself (host)

== Personal life ==
In 2005, he married Manhattan-based publicist and consultant Emily Jendrisak, the daughter of Native American activist Christine Whiterabbit Jendrisak who describes herself as a liberal Democrat. About his wife's ethnicity and their children together, McInnes said, "I've made my views on Indians very clear. I like them. I actually like them so much, I made three." They live in Larchmont, New York.

Daniel Lombroso, a journalist for The Atlantic, reported in his 2020 documentary White Noise - and in a follow up article about alt-right activist Lauren Southern - that McInnes sexually propositioned Southern after an appearance on his show in June 2018. McInnes denied having done so.

McInnes is a permanent resident of the United States.
