= List of programs broadcast by Vice =

This is a list of programming for Vice channels in the US, and in the UK. Also included are series which aired on the international Viceland channels.

== Current programming ==
=== Original series ===
Title	Premiere	Status
Dark Side of the Ring	April 10, 2019	Pending

=== Acquired programming ===
- Intervention (2017–present)
- Hoarders (2018–present)
- Ice Road Truckers (2019–present)
- Shipping Wars (2019–present)
- American Restoration (2019–present)
- Top Gear (2019–present)
- Killer Kids (2020–present)
- Unsolved Mysteries (2020–present)
- I Survived... (2020–present)
- High Stakes Poker (2021–present)
- Storage Wars (2022–present)
- Nightwatch (2022–present)
- Ghost Hunters (2022–present)
- BKB Bare Knuckle Boxing (2025–present)

== Former programming ==
=== Original series ===
- Balls Deep (February 29 – December 29, 2016)
- Gaycation (February 29, 2016 – April 30, 2017)
- Noisey (February 29, 2016 – February 14, 2017)
- Vice Essentials (February 29 – December 29, 2016)
- Vice's Guide to Film (February 29, 2016 – January 21, 2018)
- You Got Trumped: The First 100 Days (October 19, 2016-2018)
- Weediquette (February 29, 2016 – November 14, 2017)
- 1-800 LEAVE A CALL (February 29, 2016)
- Bar Talk (February 29, 2016)
- Flophouse (February 29, 2016 – April 29, 2016)
- Vice Lab (February 29, 2016 – March 17, 2016)
- Fuck, That's Delicious (March 3, 2016 – July 20, 2020)
- States of Undress (March 30, 2016 – August 1, 2017)
- Traveling the Stars: Action Bronson and Friends Watch Ancient Aliens (April 20, 2016 – August 17, 2019)
- Vice World of Sports (April 27, 2016 – April 12, 2017)
- Huang's World (April 28, 2016 – August 30, 2017)
- King of the Road (April 28, 2016 – September 11, 2018)
- Woman with Gloria Steinem (May 10 – June 28, 2016)
- Black Market with Michael K. Williams (July 5, 2016 – 2020)
- Cyberwar (July 5, 2016 – November 21, 2017)
- Vice Does America (July 6 – August 17, 2016)
- Dead Set on Life (July 7, 2016 – June 1, 2017)
- Party Legends (July 7, 2016 – July 27, 2017)
- Black Market: Dispatches (August 16 – October 18, 2016)
- Abandoned (September 2 – November 4, 2016)
- Desus & Mero (October 17, 2016 – June 28, 2018)
- Hamilton's Pharmacopeia (October 26, 2016 – February 8, 2021)
- Payday (November 11 – December 30, 2016)
- Big Night Out (December 12, 2016 – January 2, 2017)
- Bong Appétit (December 14, 2016 – June 4, 2019)
- The Pizza Show (December 29, 2016 – February 15, 2018)
- Hate Thy Neighbor (January 23, 2017 – March 27, 2018)
- Rise (January 27 – March 10, 2017)
- Needles & Pins (February 12 – March 19, 2017)
- Tattoo Age (March 17, 2017 – September 5, 2018)
- Twiz & Tuck (March 27 – May 1, 2017)
- Jungletown (March 28 – May 30, 2017)
- The Business of Life (April 23 – July 9, 2017)
- Beerland (April 27, 2017 – June 26, 2018)
- The Therapist (May 8 – October 3, 2017)
- American Boyband (June 8 – July 27, 2017)
- Funny How? (July 10 – July 14, 2017)
- Nuts + Bolts (August 3 – September 7, 2017)
- Last Chance High (August 8, 2017)
- What Would Diplo Do? (August 3 – August 31, 2017)
- Epicly Later'd (September 6 – October 25, 2017)
- The Untitled Action Bronson Show (October 23, 2017 – February 15, 2018)
- Most Expensivest (November 15, 2017 – July 13, 2020)
- The Trixie & Katya Show (November 15, 2017 – March 28, 2018)
- The Wrestlers (January 2 – March 16, 2018)
- Slutever (January 24, 2018 – March 31, 2019)
- The Ice Cream Show (April 24 – June 26, 2018)
- Hollywood Love Story (July 11 – August 22, 2018)
- Mister Tachyon (July 11 – August 29, 2018)
- My House (April 25, 2018 – June 27, 2018)
- Dopesick Nation (September 12 – November 14, 2018)
- The Hunt for the Trump Tapes with Tom Arnold (September 18 – October 16, 2018)
- Kentucky Ayahuasca (November 28, 2018 – January 29, 2019)
- Hunting ISIS (2018)
- Vice Live (February 25 – April 11, 2019)
- Jasper & Errol's First Time (June 11 – August 13, 2019)
- Danny's House (July 17 – September 4, 2019)
- Terror (August 27, 2019)
- How To Rob A Bank (September 12 – October 24, 2019)
- I Was a Teenage Felon (November 7, 2019 – November 22, 2021)
- The Impeachment Show (November 7 – November 21, 2019)
- Donkmaster (2019)
- Vice News Tonight (March 4, 2020 – May 25, 2023)
- One Star Reviews (April 1 – June 10, 2020)
- Shelter in Place with Shane Smith (April 9 – April 30, 2020)
- Seat at the Table with Anand Giridharadas (April 22 – July 14, 2020)
- No Mercy, No Malice With Professor Scott Galloway (May 7 – June 18, 2020)
- Cari & Jemele (Won't) Stick to Sports (August 19, 2020 – February 4, 2021)
- Fringe Nation (October 5 – October 26, 2020)
- The Source (October 22, 2020-November 11, 2021)
- Wet Markets Exposed (October 27 – November 17, 2020)
- While the Rest of Us Die (November 16, 2020 – December 16, 2021)
- Counter Space (November 26, 2020 – March 13, 2021)
- Betraying the Badge (January 6, 2021 – September 21, 2022)
- QAnon: The Search for Q (January 26, 2021 – September 14, 2022)
- Reset: The Unauthorized Guide to Video Games (February 3-March 6, 2021)
- Black Lives Matter: A Global Reckoning (February 7-28, 2021)
- Kings of Kush (March 9 – May 20, 2021)
- Hunters (April 10-June 22, 2021)
- I, Sniper (May 10 – June 28, 2021)
- Criminal Planet (May 11 – June 30, 2021)
- Fanatics: The Deep End (May 11 – June 24, 2021)
- Dark Side of Football (May 13 – June 17, 2021)
- Unknown Amazon with Pedro Andrade (July 13 – August 17, 2021)
- Dark Side of the 90s (July 15, 2021-September 24, 2024)
- Make Taste Happen (July 19 – August 16, 2021)
- Small Town Secrets (January 11, 2022)
- Devoured (February 21 – April 16, 2022)
- True Believers (April 11, 2022-April 11, 2023)
- Running While Black (July 1, 2022)
- Icons Unearthed (July 12, 2022-September 25, 2024)
- Dark Side of Comedy (August 16 2022-December 19, 2023)
- Tales from the Territories (October 4-December 6, 2022)
- In My Own Words (December 22 – December 26, 2022)
- Sex Before The Internet (January 10, 2023 – February 28, 2023)
- Super Maximum Retro Show (March 7-21, 2023)
- Inside Story (March 23, 2023)
- (Re)solved (April 27-July 14, 2023)
- Dark Side of the 2000s (July 18-September 12, 2023)
- Tailgaters (October 13-20, 2023)
- Nine Lives of... (January 10-March 6, 2024)
- United Gangs of America (May 15, 2024-August 5, 2025)
- Dark Side of Reality TV (September 3-November 19, 2024)
- Calipari: Razor's Edge (January 10-March 18, 2025)
- Brady vs. Belichick: The Verdict (January 21, 2025)
- Pitino: Red Storm Rising (February 11-April 3, 2025)
- The Grudge (March 6-June 11, 2025)
- Sports Gone Wrong (June 18-August 6, 2025)

=== Acquired programming ===
- People Just Do Nothing (2017–2019)
- Trapped (2017–2018)
- It's Always Sunny in Philadelphia (2017–2021)
- Blade (2018)
- X-Men (2018)
- Spider-Man: The New Animated Series (2018)
- Iron Man (2018)
- Wolverine (2018)
- UFO Hunters (2019–2020)
- Shockwave (2019–2020)
- Wahlburgers (2019–2020)
- How the States Got Their Shapes (2019–2020)
- Mega Disasters (2019–2020)
- Stan Lee's Superhumans (2019–2020)
- MonsterQuest (2019–2020)
- The Universe (2019–2020)
- Bad Ink (2019–2020)
- Hell's Angels: Ride or Die (2019–2020)
- Cults and Extreme Belief (2019–2020)
- Major League Wrestling (MLW) programming (2021)

== International ==
=== Canadian-exclusive programming ===
- Cut-Off (June 19, 2016)
- Fubar Age of Computer (2017)
- Vice Canada Reports (2016)
- Nirvanna the Band the Show (February 2, 2017 – February 9, 2018) (Moved to CBC; 2nd season never broadcast in the U.S.)

=== UK-exclusive programming ===
- Archer (May 1, 2017)
- Son of Zorn (June 12, 2017)
- Cowboy Bebop (July 17, 2017)
- Eureka Seven (July 31, 2017)
- Tokyo Ghoul (August 3, 2017)
- Tokyo Ghoul √A (August 11, 2017)
- Samurai Champloo (August 22, 2017)
- Kill la Kill (October 16, 2017)
- Durarara!! (November 19, 2017)
- Gurren Lagann (January 9, 2018)
- Seraph of the End (February 14, 2018)
- Black Butler: Book of Shadows (August 8, 2018)
- Full Metal Panic! (October 8, 2018)
- Wolf's Rain (March 11, 2019)
- Transformers: Animated (March 23, 2020)
