= List of Kid Nation participants =

Kid Nation is a CBS reality show based around a society essentially run by kids. The cast included 40 children aged from 8 to 15 years old, and from a variety of ethnic backgrounds, cultures and religions.

All 40 kids are shown according to their final district with the last 4 town council members all on the left. Those with a small gold star won a 20,000 dollar gold star, those with a larger star won a 50,000 dollar gold star, and those with a red heart left early.

== Alex ==
Alexander "Alex" Wade was a 9-year-old blue district member from Reno, Nevada. He won a gold star on day 37 in episode 12. He was shown to have intelligence in many episodes, often offering a fact or two to his companions that they did not previously know. Alex is a three-time Nevada geography champion, and represented Nevada in the 2008, 2009, and 2010 National Geographic Bee. Alex is also an International Linguistics Olympiad medalist who earned a silver medal in 2011 and a gold in 2012. He graduated from Stanford University and works at Roblox.

== Anjay ==
Anjay Ajodha was a 12-year-old from Pearland, Texas. He was introduced in episode one as a council leader (of the blue district), and remained on the council until the second election in episode 10 when he was replaced by Greg in a 2–7 vote.

He has won multiple spelling bees. He was the youngest child to compete in the Scripps Howard National Spelling Bee, at age 8, in 2003, and placed 18th overall in the National Spelling Bee in 2006. When he was seven years old, he was judged "the best young speller in the Senior Spelling Bee category". Anjay was homeschooled until the third grade and remained an accelerated student. He became an Eagle Scout in 2011. Anjay graduated from the Honors College at the University of Houston in 2015 with a degree in computer science and has worked at Microsoft. He has been a commentator for the Houston Public Media Spelling Bee for several years, along with host Ernie Manouse.

Anjay participated in the 2024 Vice TV documentary episode of Dark Side of Reality TV on the making of the show.

== Blaine ==
Blaine Wise was a 14-year-old from North Palm Beach, Florida. He is not related to fellow participant Sophia Wise despite sharing the last name. Blaine was originally assigned to the blue district and became close friends with Greg. In the ninth episode, Blaine was transferred to the yellow district, where he was able to excel outside of Greg's shadow of influence. He promptly won a gold star in episode 9 for his performance and ability to motivate his new team. In the tenth episode, Blaine was elected to the town council, narrowly defeating incumbent Zach (5-4) who had brought him into the yellow team.

Blaine studied criminal justice at Greensboro College and is married with children.

== Brett ==
Brett Norstom was an 11-year-old yellow district member from Edina, Minnesota.

== Campbell ==
Campbell Beadles was a 10-year-old green district member from Thomasville, Georgia. He was quite upset after his friend Cody left on the 13th day.

== Cody ==
Cody Mendenhall was a 9-year-old yellow district member from Newport, Ohio. He left the series on day 13 in episode 4, due to homesickness.

== Colton ==
Colton Blake was an 11-year-old yellow district member from Reno, Nevada. He helped the yellow team finish in first place for the first time.

== Divad ==
Divad Miles was an 11-year-old red district member from Fayetteville, Georgia. She was known as the "potato girl" throughout the show for her dedication to cooking potatoes for the town. She also made numerous appeals to the town council and her fellow townsfolk to be nominated for the gold star, though she never received it.

Before her time on Kid Nation, she founded a non-profit organization in 2005, Sow Our Seeds, Inc., which focuses on motivating individuals to do positive deeds in their communities. Miles earned a bachelor’s degree from the Georgia Institute of Technology in 2017, a master’s degree from Mercer University in 2020, and a doctorate from the University of Mississippi in 2024.

== DK ==
Daniel "DK" Kyri (born October 10, 1992) was a 14-year-old red district member from Chicago, Illinois. He won a gold star in the sixth episode for his hard work and ability to solve conflicts involving other kids. He came very close to not winning the gold star, however, as he volunteered to leave just before the announcement because he had grown tired of all the constant bickering; Guylan convinced him to stay and he was awarded the gold star. He replaced Guylan as a town council member during the second election without contest. He is also the only member of the red district to win a gold star.

He is a writer and actor, appearing in a recurring role in Chicago Fire, Hamlet at The Gift Theatre in Chicago, Objects in the Mirror at Goodman Theatre, and Monster at Steppenwolf Theatre Company. It was revealed in a 2024 Vice episode of Dark Side of Reality TV that Kyri was the victim in the bleach drinking incident. He took a soda-style bottle that contained bleach and drank it. He was treated by medical staff and returned to set on the same day.

== Emilie ==
Emilie was a 9-year-old red district member from Nevada. She had very strong opinions about whether or not to kill the chickens for food, as the Pioneer's Journal told them to do. They eventually killed the chicken anyway, with many objections from Emilie. She got traded to the blue district from the red district in episode 9 because Anjay felt that she didn't work hard in the red district and didn't like her red district mates.

== Eric ==
Eric Sturm was a 14-year-old green district member from Morristown, New Jersey. In the talent show, he played the piano and sang Leaving New Jersey, an original composition. He was also friends with Zach who was on the yellow district, Hunter and Michael who were also in the green district.

He appeared on the Kid Nation by the Kids podcast, hosted by green district members Michael Thot and Sophia Wise, where he revealed that he is a social worker for a middle school in Brooklyn.

== Gianna ==
Gianna Clark was a 10-year-old blue district member from Chicago, Illinois. She was naturally quiet, and was seen speaking only twice on the show. She was well liked by her teammates because she was friendly and was a dependable, hard worker.

After graduating from Stanford University, Gianna moved back to Chicago for a few years but then relocated to Los Angeles.

== Greg ==
Gregory Pheasant was a 15-year-old blue district member from Reno, Nevada, and the oldest participant on the show. He was the oldest and strongest kid in the town. Often temperamental and, at times, he even seemed to bully and tease his counterparts, which he referred to as "tough love." A hard worker, Greg was nominated for gold stars in three of the first four episodes, but was voted against because of Mike's suspicions about Greg's motivations. Depicted as very bossy and bullying to the younger children who became fearful of him, Greg won a gold star in episode 5 for being a genuinely hard worker, improving his attitude, and for comforting some of the younger participants who were dealing with homesickness. In the tenth episode, Greg was elected to the town council for the blue district, defeating Anjay 7–2.

In an interview with the Eric Barber Show in 2020, Pheasant revealed he is married with kids. He was the president of MRANN for three years and currently is involved with national racing associations. Greg was just recently signed on as a Ford Factory Off Road Driver and will compete in Reno to Vegas (formally known as Vegas to Reno) for his tenth year. Greg has won three out of the nine Vegas to Reno years in different classes. He still occasionally rides motorcycles but mostly supports his kids at their races. Greg and his oldest boy have taken up hunting and filling their tags every year. His wife still rides motorcycles at home with the kids but stopped racing too, and they have two horses, 20 chickens, a rabbit and five dogs on property at home.

== Guylan ==
Guylan Qudsieh was an 11-year-old red district member from Upton, Massachusetts. He became a member of the town council at the first elections on day 16 (episode 5), taking Mike's place as leader of the red district. He was overwhelmed with the responsibilities and criticized that as a leader he had to endure and at the second election on day 29 (episode 10), he asked the town to vote him off.

== Hunter ==
Hunter Jeffers was a 12-year-old boy and was a green district member from Martinez, Georgia. He received a gold star on day 34 in episode 11 for his hard work. Hunter was also shown leading some of the town in prayer.

Hunter studied accounting at Georgia College & State University.

== Jared ==
Jared Goldman (later Vivi Goldman) was an 11-year-old red district member from Dunwoody, Georgia. Goldman was shown to be quite intelligent and was known for making quirky quotations that didn't always fit the situation such as "Holy Banana Bread!" and "Pelvis has left the building baby!". After the show aired, Goldman sold several leftover "Bonanza 2007" necklaces on eBay. During the Kid Nation talent show, Goldman recited a passage from Shakespeare, which had been practiced earlier by reading to the chickens, and expressed satisfaction that the performance "wasn't the worst one." Goldman was close to winning the gold star in episode 12 (day 37), but lost to Alex. During the first dinner, Goldman approached one of the leaders and stated that "Today has been the worst day in three years." This comment was met with questions from viewers as to what happened three years prior to that day.

Goldman appeared as a guest on the Kid Nation by the Kids hosted by Kid Nation members Michael Thot and Sophia Wise, where she had confirmed to have since transitioned since 2014. She received a degree from Georgia State University in 2021 and has since gone into IT.

== Jasmine ==
Jasmine Robinson was an 11-year-old red district member from Atlanta, Georgia. She is the subject of a confessional-style interview and sang during episode 8.

Jasmine started acting and singing at the age of four and landed her first commercial with Volvo. She has been in Toys R US, Christmas, Thanksgiving, Back to School, Halloween and Valentine commercials. She is part of a jazz group that has appeared in the movie Far From the Altar and television shows Survivor's Remorse and Greenleaf.

== Jimmy ==
James "Jimmy" Flynn (born 1998) was an 8-year-old green district member from Salem, New Hampshire. He was the youngest participant, and left the show in the first episode on day 4 due to homesickness.

He made an appearance in a JonTron YouTube video at the age of 21, where he was interviewed about his experience on Kid Nation. During the interview, he noted his intent to become an oncologist. He appeared in the 2024 Vice TV documentary episode of Dark Side of Reality TV on the making of the show where he revealed that he was in medical school. He shared that he was bullied after the show for crying on television.

== Kelsey ==
Kelsey Liu was an 11-year-old yellow district member from Furlong, Pennsylvania, a small town east of Doylestown. She made friends easily with the other yellow team girls. She appeared in every episode and also in several publicity interviews for the show since filming was complete. Kelsey is a talented pianist, as seen in the talent show segment of episode 8, Starved for Entertainment. She is also best friends with Leila, Taylor, Randi and Sophie, her fellow district members.

== Kennedy ==
Kennedy Peyton Womack was a 12-year-old green district member from Ashland, Kentucky. She was awarded a gold star on day 25 (episode 8) for her hard work, social demeanor, and outgoing personality, and also for convincing Savannah to stay with the community in spite of homesickness. Kennedy is a poet, and was also a nationally ranked tennis player in her age group.

Womack graduated from Morehead State University with a BA and then a J.D. from the University of Cincinnati College of Law. She works as a public defender.

== Laurel ==
Laurel McGoff (born January 12, 1995) was a 12-year-old green district member from Medford, Massachusetts. Laurel was appointed to the first town council and was re-elected in the first election. She was defeated by Michael in the second election on day 29 (6-3) (episode 10). She subsequently received a gold star on day 31 for her work on the council and as an effective overall leader for the entire town. In Kid Nation she appeared significantly in every episode as well as publicity interviews for the show after filming. She also appeared at a younger age on the PBS Kids Go! show, Fetch! with Ruff Ruffman in episodes "B.L.T. for Breakfast?" and "Tryin' Chef" because her elder brother, Brian, was a contestant on the show. She did not participate in the talent show, but at the town meeting later that episode, she was convinced to sing "Amazing Grace" after being prompted by D.K.

McGoff has released social media videos discussing her experience on the show. She works in Boston as a special education teacher and has also pursued comedy.

== Leila ==
Leila Mallouky was a 9-year-old yellow district member from Charlotte, North Carolina.

== Madison ==
Madison Rae Taff was an 11-year-old red district member from El Paso, Texas. She is an avid guitar player. Though a hard worker on the show, she was quiet and was seen speaking only three times on the show.

== Maggie ==
Margaret "Maggie" Levie was a 14-year-old red district member from Evansville, Minnesota.

Maggie attended Evansville Public School until 8th grade where she started homeschooling. She was home-schooled in Minnesota. Maggie has done various amounts of theater work and has a passion for music. She recorded her first demo CD at Pachyderm Studios in Cannon Falls, Minnesota. Her mother, Patty Kakac, is a singer-songwriter.

== Mallory ==
Mallory Cloer was an 8-year-old blue district member from Indianapolis, Indiana. She won a gold star on her 9th birthday (day 10) in the third episode. She is Olivia's younger sister. Both Mallory and her sister, Olivia did interviews for Radio Disney and several other radio stations.

Mallory graduated from Anderson University with a degree in biology. She is married and works as a patient care assistant in Indianapolis.

== Markelle ==
Markelle Gay (born September 24, 1994, in Chesapeake, Virginia) was a 12-year-old red district member from the East Cobb area of Marietta, Georgia. While interviewing in NY after Kid Nation, he landed a spot on the KidzBop World Tour, along with five other kids from around the nation and a full band. He has toured in professional productions of Broadway's Beauty and the Beast and The Music Man, as well as commercials and industrials for McDonald's, Country Crock, Ford Motor Company, and Cartoon Network. He appears in the film Dirty Laundry, playing the young Eugene. Markelle became a member of Actors' Equity Association and was admitted to Walnut Hill School for the Performing Arts in 2011 and booked a recurring co-starring role in the Cue Box on Studio 252 TV. Markelle studied at the Savannah College of Art and Design. In 2017, Markelle was cast as a principal role, Darius, in the 2017 Kenny Leon directed musical Holler if Ya Hear Me.

== Michael ==
Michael Thot was a 14-year-old green district member from Sultan, Washington. Michael was awarded a gold star on day 7 for his motivational speaking and rationality (episode 2), and was elected to the town council in the second election on day 29 (episode 10), replacing Laurel. He turned 15 years old during episode 11.

He later recounted his experience with the show in an interview with Cracked.com, and answered questions about the production on the r/IAmA Reddit forum.

Thot studied broadcast journalism and philosophy at the American University and works as a documentation engineer with Meta.

He has since done an interview with the Eric Barber Show in 2020. In 2025, he started a podcast with fellow green team member Sophia Wise Kid Nation Podcast by the Kids.

== Miglė ==
Miglė Drąsutavičiutė was a 13-year-old blue district member from Downers Grove, Illinois. Miglė won a special gold star at the conclusion of the final episode, having been selected as the most improved participant.

Miglė (pronounced "ME-glay") immigrated to America from Lithuania. She is an aspiring actress and performed under two stage names "Otilija Venckus", which is her mother's last name, and "Meglea Drasa".

== Mike ==
Michael Klinge was an 11-year-old red district member from Bellevue, Washington. He was introduced in episode one as a town council member. He was replaced by Guylan during the first election on Day 16 (episode 5) in a 1–9 vote.

Mike has competed in orienteering through the Washington Interscholastic Orienteering League and Cascade Orienteering Club. In November 2007, Mike was cast as Louis Leonowens in Village Theater's Production of The King And I. Prior to that, Mike understudied the role of Randolph in the previous season's Bye Bye Birdie. Mike's past Village Theatre Kidstage roles include JoJo in Seussical and Gavroche in Les Misérables.

== Morgan ==
Morgan Wood was a 12-year-old green district member from Indianapolis, Indiana. She was one of only two participants to receive two gold stars. The first was a $20,000 gold star awarded on day 13 (episode 4) for successfully establishing a no-pressure time of spirituality and prayer for the kids. The second was a $50,000 gold star awarded at the conclusion of the series for her positive helpful attitude and for working hard to unify the community.

In 2019, Morgan performed in the Puerto Rico tour of the musical Hamilton, for which she had been a member of the ensemble and an understudy in US tours.

In 2024 she began performing as Eliza in Hamilton on Broadway.

== Natasha ==
Natasha Goenaga was a 13-year-old blue district member from Miami, Florida. Natasha was friends with Migle. Natasha has been acting and modeling since age 7. She has done commercials in both English and Spanish for Publix, Coca-Cola, Toys R Us, Miami Children's Hospital and several clothing catalogs. She is also a dancer and was a hip hop dancer for Pop Starz kids production. Natasha was in the gifted program at her middle school.

== Nathan ==
Nathan Gibes was an 11-year-old boy from Mount Prospect, Illinois. He received a gold star in episode 7 for his hard work and dedication, even having to be told to relax on occasion by council members. In episode 9, he was drafted from the blue district to the red district because Guylan felt his team was lacking hard and smarter workers.

Gibes has a BA in economics from Carleton College and an MBA from the University of Chicago. He works in engineering.

== Olivia ==
Olivia Cloer was a 12-year-old blue district member from Indianapolis, Indiana. She ran for district council against Anjay in the first election on day 16 (episode 5), but lost with 3 votes to 7. She appeared to carry a grudge against Anjay after this, often picking on him, but reportedly, apologizing afterward. She is Mallory's older sister. Olivia came close to getting a gold star in (episode 8) and was praised highly for her stand-up comedy act in the talent show.

Olivia has a degree in writing and communications from DePauw University. She released a book in 2020 entitled Stronger Than You Think in which she describes her experiences on the show.

Olivia and her father participated in second episode of the 2024 Vice TV documentary series Dark Side of Reality TV about the show, where she spoke about the way she was portrayed and the impact it had on her life. Anjay confirmed they have been friends since after the show. Olivia's father spoke about his and his wife's shock at the conditions their children lived in when they visited the set at the show's conclusion.

== Pharaoh ==
Pharaoh Williams was a 12-year-old yellow district member from Philadelphia, Pennsylvania. He came close to winning the gold star in episode 7 but lost to Nathan.

== Randi ==
Randi Buchanan was 11 but turned 12 in an unknown episode. She was a yellow district member from Sparks, Nevada. She left the show on day 28 during episode 9 after becoming homesick.

== Savannah ==
Savannah Sergent was a 10-year-old green district member from Partridge, Kentucky, a small town northeast of Cumberland. She considered leaving the show due to homesickness during episode 8, but was persuaded to stay by Kennedy who was subsequently awarded a gold star. Savannah has mentioned some of her experiences in TikTok videos.

== Sophia ==
Sophia Wise was a 14-year-old green district member from Winter Park, Florida. She is not related to fellow contestant Blaine Wise, despite sharing a last name and home state. She was one of only two participants to win two gold stars. The first was a $20,000 gold star won on day four in episode 1 for her work ethic in running the kitchen. Then in the final episode, Sophia was awarded the first of three bonus $50,000 gold star, for her consistency in her hard work. In episode 11 she was appointed town sheriff to help with enforcement of rules, as certain kids continued to shirk their duties to the town.

She graduated from Smith College with a BA in Latin and history in 2014, and later got a law degree from Fordham University. On May 20, 2020, Wise posted a video on her YouTube channel answering questions of her experience on the show. In a Reddit post, she announced that she would be writing a book. In 2025, Wise started the Kid Nation by the Kids podcast with fellow green team member Michael Thot.

== Sophie ==
Sophie Mittelstaedt was a 10-year-old yellow district member from Issaquah, Washington. She is a talented writer and soccer player. She and Mallory became extremely close friends, and collaborated in running a free "daycare" for stuffed animals in Bonanza City.

== Taylor ==
Taylor DuPriest (born April 22, 1996, in Albany, Georgia) was a 10-year-old yellow district member from Sylvester, Georgia. Taylor began the show as a town council member, but was removed from the council during the first election, when she was replaced by Zach with a 4–5 vote. Her catchphrase on Kid Nation was "Deal with it!" Taylor was infamous for being incredibly lazy and defiant from the beginning to the end of the show, once stating that "beauty queens don't do dishes." Even as a council member, Taylor encouraged fellow district mates not to participate in chores through example and lack of leadership.

Taylor entered and won a number of beauty pageants. Winning Miss Georgia Sweetheart 2005, Hall of Fame winner at the Junior Miss Georgia Forestry pageant, 4th Runner-Up 2006 National Sweetheart Miss American Coed Pageant (as well as 3rd Runner-Up Model), and an online store's model search. She has done several prints and appeared on Disney Channel's Show Your Stuff.

In an Entertainment Weekly article on a number of different controversial reality show participants, Taylor revealed that one of her most outrageous lines, "Ugly chickens DESERVE to die" was fed to her by the producers.

She was at school for Occupational Therapy in St. Augustine, Florida until graduating in April 2020.

== Zach ==
Zachary "Zach" Kosnitzky was a 10-year-old yellow district member from Miami Beach, Florida. He was nominated for a gold star in episode 4 for his hard work and dedication, but lost to Morgan. Zach became a council member after the first election on day 16 (episode 5) when he narrowly defeated Taylor by a margin of 5–4. Zach arranged to obtain Blaine from the blue team in episode 9 in order to gain some strength in the challenges because his team had the youngest participants. He was subsequently defeated by Blaine by a margin of 4–5 in the second election in episode 10. He finally received a gold star in the last episode for his hard work and attitude toward making Bonanza City a better place.

After Kid Nation, Zach played the role of Lewis in Beethoven's Big Break, the sixth installment of the Beethoven film series. He studied law at the University of North Carolina Chapel Hill.
