= Kalu Yala =

Eco-sustainable town in Panama

San Blas, Kuna Yala Panamá

Kalu Yala is a failed project eco-sustainable in the Tres Brazos Valley of Panama. The abandoned hostel is along the shore of the Pacora River. It was the subject of the 2017 reality television series, "Jungletown" that aired on Vice TV.

== Location ==
The town is located 50 minutes from Panama City and about 35 minutes from Panama's International Airport by car. The "base camp" in San Miguel is accessible by car, where visitors then hike 8 kilometers or take a special 4x4 vehicle to the town.

== Planning ==
"A real estate developer bought 500 acres of Panamanian rainforest in 2008 hoping to flip it, but the market collapsed and he instead started the sustainable town. College students pay $5,000 for a semester..."

The building site is a midterm project, and an "incubator" for the creation of "environmentally and socially responsible communities". Jimmy Stice is the creator and CEO of Kalu Yala. Though not yet under construction, much of the town has been designed by Moule & Polyzoides Architects and Urbanists based in Pasadena, CA. These architects are part of the New Urbanism project.

In 2017, despite Kalu Yala's stated altruistic, sustainability and educational goals, the venture is profit seeking and solicited a $12 million Series A venture capital round with the intent to achieve a $100 million valuation in five years.

In 2019, Stice had originally planned flip the site for traditional development before the Great Recession.

== Internships ==
Since Summer 2010, The Kalu Yala Institute has offered students from around the world the opportunity to conduct research projects on "best practices in sustainable living". Kalu Yala Institute classes include agriculture, biology, business, education and community development, design thinking, farm-to-table culinary arts, health and wellness, and outdoor recreation. As of Fall 2015, The Institute has had people from 48 states, 25 countries and 150 colleges. Tailored programs allow participants to set their own class project and research agendas for their contributions to the sustainable community.

When the Covid-19 virus outbreak occurred, it became a safe haven for visitors to Panama.

== Jungletown ==
"VICELAND show happened because the owner of Kalu Yala connected with HATCH, ... and through HATCH we connected with Ondi Timoner, .... She sold it to the VICE"

In Fall 2017, Kalu Yala was the subject of a Viceland reality television series broadcast by Vice, entitled "Jungletown." The show depicts a nascent settlement in the jungle where students study, live, and assist in the project development of Kalu Yala. Throughout the show, a number of the interns leave Kalu Yala prematurely citing a range of reasons, including the difficult jungle environment, mental illness and concerns that the organizers were disorganized and possibly mislead prospective interns (students).

== See also ==
- Telosa
- Peter Thiel
- Utopia (2014 American TV series)
- Utopia (British TV series)
- Utopia (2020 TV series)
