= Kid Nation =

American reality television show

- Genre: Reality
- Directed by: Jack Cannon
- Presented by: Jonathan Karsh
- Starring: See Participants below
- Composers: Jeff Lippencott and Mark T. Williams, Ah2 Music
- Country of origin: United States
- Original language: English
- No. of seasons: 1
- No. of episodes: 13 (list of episodes)

Production
- Executive producer: Tom Forman
- Production location: Bonanza City, New Mexico
- Running time: 60 minutes
- Production companies: Tom Forman Productions; Endemol USA

Original release
- Network: CBS
- Release: September 19 – December 12, 2007

Kid Nation is an American reality television show hosted by Jonathan Karsh that premiered on the CBS network on September 19, 2007 created by Tom Forman Productions and Endemol USA.

In the show, the children try to create a functioning society in the town, including setting up a government system with minimal adult help and supervision.

On May 14, 2008, CBS canceled the series after one season.

In 2020, the series generated a renewed interest with mixed reviews as many YouTubers independently reviewed, discussed, and commented on each of the thirteen original episodes. In addition, many former members of the show gave interviews and commentary of their own during that time.

== Synopsis ==
The show, featuring 40 children and adolescents aged 8 to 15, was filmed on location at the Bonanza Creek Movie Ranch, a privately owned town built on the ruins of Bonanza City, New Mexico, 13 miles (21 km) south of Santa Fe.

The show stresses the difficulty in creating a viable society. While each child received $5,000 for their involvement, Gold Stars valued at $20,000 and $50,000 were awarded to select outstanding participants as decided by the elected Town Council.

Speaking before an audience of television reviewers, producer Tom Forman acknowledged that Kid Nation would inevitably share some elements with William Golding's novel Lord of the Flies, which depicted planewrecked children without adult supervision. Adults were present off-camera during production, including cameramen, producers, a medic, and a child psychologist, although all interacted with the children as little as possible. Participants also missed a month of school, but Forman suggested that such real-world tasks as preparing a group breakfast, doing physical chores like fetching water, and making group decisions constituted an educational experience in their own right. Forman said that all participants were cleared by a team of psychologists and any child could choose to go home during any of the regular town meetings, which three did.

== Episodes ==
No.	Episode Title	Days	Airdate	Upper-Class	Merchants	Cooks	Laborers	Town Bonus	Gold Star	Exits
1	"I'm Trying to be a Leader Here!"	1–4	September 19	Red	Blue	Yellow	Green	Seven Outhouses	Sophia	Jimmy
2	"To Kill or Not to Kill"	5–7	September 26	Blue	Red	Yellow	Green	None (Task Failed)	Michael	None
3	"Deal with It!"	8–10	October 3	Yellow	Blue	Green	Red	Microwave & Cocoa	Mallory	None
4	"Bless Us and Keep Us Safe"	11–13	October 10	Blue	Red	Yellow	Green	Religious Books	Morgan	Cody
5	"Viva La Revolución!"	14–16	October 17	Yellow	Green	Red	Blue	Oral Hygiene Products	Greg	None
6	"Bonanza Is Disgusting"	17–19	October 24	Red	Green	Yellow	Blue	Fruits & Vegetables	DK	None
7	"The Root of All Evil"	20–22	October 31	Blue	Yellow	Green	Red	New Clothes & Free Laundry	Nathan	None
8	"Starved for Entertainment"	23–25	November 7	Green	Blue	Red	Yellow	None (Task Failed)	Kennedy	None
9	"Not Even Close to Fair"	26–28	November 14	Blue	Yellow	Green	Red	None (Task Failed)	Blaine	Randi
10	"Let Me Talk!"	29–31	November 21	Blue	Green	Yellow	Red	Letters From Home	Laurel	None
11	"I Just Like the Recess Part"	32–34	November 28	Green	Blue	Yellow	Red	Town Arcade	Hunter	None
12	"Where's Bonanza, Dude?"	35–37	December 5	Green	Red	Blue	Yellow	Hot Air Balloon Ride	Alex	None
13	"We've All Decided to Go Mad!"	38–40	December 12	No District Assignments				Three Gold Stars each $50,000	Zach; Sophia^{^{A}} Morgan^{^{A}} Miglė^{^{A}}	All (final episode)

^AThese gold stars were worth $20,000 and were awarded at the final town hall meeting.

== Participants ==
The participants of Kid Nation consist of 40 kids, whose ages ranged from 8 to 15. The following table lists each child's district color (including change if applicable), age at the onset of the show, home state, the terms they held in Town Council, the day they received a gold star, when they left Bonanza City and any applicable notes.

^{1}	^{2}	Name	Age	State	Town Council	Gold Star	Exit	Note(s)
B	B	Alex	9	Nevada		Day 37		
B	B	Anjay	12	Texas	Days 1–29			
B	Y	Blaine	14	Florida	Days 29–40	Day 28		Changed districts in episode 9
Y	Y	Brett	11	Minnesota				
G	G	Campbell	10	Georgia				
Y	N/A	Cody	9	Ohio			Day 13	
Y	Y	Colton	11	Nevada				
R	R	Divad	11	Georgia				
R	R	DK	14	Illinois	Days 29–40	Day 19		
R	B	Emilie	9	Nevada				Changed districts in episode 9
G	G	Eric	14	New Jersey				
B	B	Gianna	10	Illinois				
B	B	Greg	15	Nevada	Days 29–40	Day 16		Oldest participant
R	R	Guylan	11	Massachusetts	Days 16–29			
G	G	Hunter	12	Georgia		Day 34		
R	R	Jared	11	Georgia				
R	R	Jasmine	11	Georgia				
G	N/A	Jimmy	8	New Hampshire			Day 4	Youngest participant
Y	Y	Kelsey	11	Pennsylvania				
G	G	Kennedy	12	Kentucky		Day 25		
G	G	Laurel	12	Massachusetts	Days 1–29	Day 31		
Y	Y	Leila	9	North Carolina				
R	R	Madison	11	Texas				
R	R	Maggie	14	Minnesota				
B	B	Mallory	8	Indiana		Day 10		9th birthday during episode 3 Olivia's sister
R	R	Markelle	12	Georgia				
G	G	Michael	14	Washington	Days 29–40	Day 7		15th birthday during episode 11
B	B	Miglė	13	Illinois		Day 40^{3}		
R	R	Mike	11	Washington	Days 1–16			
G	G	Morgan	12	Indiana		Day 13; Day 40^{3}		
B	B	Natasha	13	Florida				
B	R	Nathan	11	Illinois		Day 22		Changed districts in episode 9
B	B	Olivia	12	Indiana				Mallory's sister
Y	Y	Pharaoh	12	Pennsylvania				
Y	N/A	Randi	11	Nevada			Day 28	Turns 12 (somewhere between episode 5 and 9)
G	G	Savannah	10	Kentucky				
G	G	Sophia	14	Florida		Day 4 Day 40^{3}		Appointed town sheriff in episode 11
Y	Y	Sophie	10	Washington				
Y	Y	Taylor	10	Georgia	Days 1–16			11th birthday during episode 7
Y	Y	Zach	10	Florida	Days 16–29	Day 39		

^1Original district
^2Final district color or black, with N/A (Not Applicable) if participant left the show
^3These gold stars were worth $50,000 (equivalent to $78,000 in 2025) and were awarded at the final town hall meeting.

== Reception and legacy ==
=== Pre-premiere ===
Ahead of its premiere, the show proved to be the most controversial of the upcoming fall 2007 season, although the only actual footage seen was a four-minute promo running on television and the Web. In previewing the series, CBS eschewed television critics, instead holding screenings at schools in at least seven large cities. Variety columnist Brian Lowry wrote that "Kid Nation is only the latest program to use kids as fodder for fun and profit, which doesn't make the trend any less disturbing." William Coleman, a professor of pediatrics at the University of North Carolina, argued that the younger children, ages 8 to 12, might not be able to deal with the stress, yet could be enticed to participate by the potential fame or be pressured to do so by a parent.

Los Angeles Times reporter Maria Elena Fernandez interviewed four of the children, who told her they had worked harder than they ever had in their lives but would willingly repeat the experience. They said the most challenging aspect was getting used to being filmed constantly.

=== Post-premiere ===
After the show's premiere, many television critics wrote negative reviews, with Los Angeles Times critic Robert Lloyd being an exception. Reviewing the first episode, Washington Post columnist Tom Shales suggested that the show is "not so much an exercise in socialization as the indoctrination of children into a consumer culture". Shales pointed out that the kids' decisions included buying root beer at the saloon with "real money", but not hiring or being hired—as their money was "parceled out to them according to their predetermined stations in life."

By the third episode, some advertisers that had shied away from Kid Nation due to its initial controversy had begun to purchase time.

Reflecting near the end of the season, Los Angeles Times writer Maria Elena Fernandez, who had reported extensively on Kid Nation, wrote that neither the show's pre-premiere promises nor controversies quite congealed: the children were never as autonomous or self-reliant as the publicity indicated and the threatened legal investigations by the state of New Mexico never took off. As the series concluded, low ratings had cast doubt on whether CBS would renew the show. Brad Adgate, an analyst with Horizon Media, said the chances were not good unless a writers' strike, ongoing at the time of the season finale, increased demand for more reality shows.

=== Accolades ===
Time magazine's James Poniewozik named it one of the Top 10 New TV Series of 2007, ranking it at #10.

It was nominated for Best Family Television Reality Show, Game Show or Documentary at the 29th Annual Young Artist Awards.

=== In other media ===
It was also the subject of the second episode of the 2024 VICE docuseries Dark Side of Reality TV.

=== U.S. Nielsen ratings ===
No.	Episode	Viewers (millions)	Households	Adults 18–49
1	"I'm Trying to Be a Leader Here!"	9.07	5.8/10	3.0/9
2	"To Kill or Not to Kill"	7.6	4.8/8	2.8/8
3	"Deal With It!"	7.51	4.7/8	2.4/7
4	"Bless Us and Keep Us Safe"	7.01	4.3/7	2.0/6
5	"Viva La Revolucion!"	7.41	4.7/8	2.4/7
6	"Bonanza is Disgusting"	8.03	5.1/8	2.5/7
7	"The Root of All Evil"	6.89	4.4/8	2.0/7
8	"Starved for Entertainment"	7.16	4.5/7	2.1/6
9	"Not Even Close to Fair"	7.53	4.7/8	2.4/7
10	"Let Me Talk!"	6.88	4.3/7	2.0/6
11	"I Just Like the Recess Part"	7.29	4.5/7	2.1/6
12	"Where's Bonanza, Dude?"	7.2	4.5/7	2.2/6
13	"We've All Decided to Go Mad!"	7.35	4.5/7	2.2/6

=== Treatment of children and broader legal implications ===
Kid Nation raised questions about the appropriate minimum age of participants in reality shows. As with most other reality shows, the children were signed on contracts requiring them to be available for filming for 24 hours a day through the 40-day filming period. The federal Fair Labor Standards Act of 1938 limits the number of hours that children can work in a day, but has exemptions for film and television production. This leaves states to regulate those industries. At the time of filming, New Mexico had passed a law to limit children's participation in film and television productions to nine hours a day while Kid Nation was filming, but it did not come into enforcement until a month after filming completed. However, New Mexico had other general child-labor provisions that limited children under 14 to a maximum number of hours per week or day unless previously cleared with the state, which CBS had not appeared to have obtained. Adults were on site with the children but the nature of how the adults supervised the children made it appear that the children were unlawfully engaged in labor under New Mexico law, according to the state. The producers challenged these claims by declaring the set a summer camp rather than a place of employment. This was further questioned by the state, as there are additional rules related to camp operations set by the state that were not followed by production. The ostensible loopholes production had claimed have since been closed.

Health issues were also raised. Parents were required to sign a 22-page waiver that disavowed any responsibility on CBS or production for harm from any medical care given to the children. Forman, ten years after the show's airing, stated that the children were never in any real danger with the amount of adult supervision present, but that the length and terms of the waiver were meant to try to cover all the possible ways they believed that injury could possibly befall the children during production at that location. After 11-year-old Divad Miles was burned when grease splattered onto her face while cooking a meal, her mother, Janis Miles, filed a complaint in June calling for an investigation into "abusive acts to minors and possible violations of child labor laws." The claim was investigated by Santa Fe County Sheriff's Office, which found no criminal wrongdoing on the part of the production company. Other investigative efforts by the state of New Mexico into the Kid Nation production were later dropped. The state's Attorney General's Office cited the lack of formal complaint or request for inquiry from any state agency. The state's Department of Workforce Solutions dropped its charge that the producers had denied inspectors access to the set and said it had no plans to investigate.

The Kid Nation production also raised questions about whether reality show participants are more like subjects in a documentary or working actors. The latter are covered by union rules that govern everything from working hours to compensation. This debate over participant status could be seen in an American Federation of Television and Radio Artists investigation over whether its AFTRA National Code of Fair Practices for Network Television Broadcasting was violated. The investigation went forward even though on reality shows, the Network Code generally covers professional performers, but not the participants. Some parents on hand for the final day of filming accused the producers of feeding children lines, re-casting dialogue and repeating scenes, all of which suggested that the children functioned as actors. Producer Tom Forman said that the parents were observing routine "pickups" for scenes that might have been missed because of technical difficulties.

CBS defended the production's conduct as both legal and ethical, including the response to minor injuries on the set. The network characterized some early allegations as irresponsible, exaggerated or false.

As the children that participated became adults, they began to discuss the show's events in various media outlets, with stories of various praise and concern of the show's production. One of the first such was from Michael who offered a Reddit "Ask Me Anything" in 2014, noting that the show had set out to try to fill various stereotypes with casting. The A.V. Club spoke to several of the participants in 2020, including Laurel, Anjay, and Olivia, confirming some of the stories, and that much of the show as presented on television was more dramatized than actually occurred, setting up certain children like Olivia as a "stock villain", despite this not being the case behind the cameras. There had been a highly-publicized story about one child drinking bleach; Anjay explained in this report that this had been a result of a bottle of bleach being mistaken for a bottle of seltzer water that they had for flavoring drinks in the town store, but medical staff were there immediately to treat the affected child, later revealed to be DK, who was returned to the set shortly afterward. Anjay stated that there were over 200 adults near the set at any time, and while he did not consider the show in any way abusive, he did state that "it was definitely a lot more exploitative than I remember it being back then" on watching it as an adult. YouTuber JonTron (Jon Jafari) interviewed Jimmy Flynn, the first child to leave the show, in 2020. Jimmy criticized the harsh conditions that the production crew placed upon the children, such as making them cook their own food and wash their own dishes, the poor sanitary conditions (one outhouse for 40 kids and no showers until the first showdown) and the poor sleeping conditions. He also confirmed that on two separate occasions, ambulances were called because one child accidentally consumed bleach from an improperly rinsed container, and the aforementioned Divad Miles burned her face with grease while cooking.

Forman has stated that he would like to return to Kid Nation not so much to produce a sequel, given the amount of difficulty it would take to produce such a work, but more as a "where are they now" type program to follow where the cast has since become as adults.

== See also ==
- Boys and Girls Alone - a British show that attracted similar controversy
- Social effects of television
- Lord of the Flies
