= Srub (disambiguation) =

Srub may refer to:

- Srub, a Russian post-punk/dark folk band founded
- Srubnaya culture (Srub), an archaeological culture
