= Srub =

Russian band

Srub Сруб
- Origin: Novosibirsk, Russia
- Genres: post-punk; dark folk; progressive rock; post-black metal
- Years active: 2013 – present
- Label: Gleb Godunov
- Members: Igor Shapransky; Ilya Fedoseyenko; Ivan Griboyedov; Vladimir Kalmazan
- Past members: Stanislav Kulikov; Konstantin Pritychenko; German Kredens; Elizaveta Shapranskaya; Gleb Gofman; Denis Plyaskovsky
- Website: band.link/srub

Srub (Russian: Сруб, lit. 'log cabin') is a Russian post-punk/dark folk band formed 2013 in Novosibirsk.

The band gained recognition for its fusion of genres, described as a blend between post-punk, coldwave, and neofolk with elements of Russian folk, progressive rock, and post-black metal. The band’s lyrics, written exclusively in Russian, explore themes of mysticism, natural imagery, dual faith (the coexistence of pagan and Christian traditions), and abstract archaic ritual symbolism.

== History ==
=== Formation: 2013 ===
Srub was formed in the spring of 2013 in Novosibirsk by multi-instrumentalist Igor Shapransky and bassist Stanislav Kulikov, who had previously played in heavier musical projects, including local post-punk/black metal band Kultura Kureniya.

In June 2013, Srub released its debut EP Po griby ("For Mushrooms"). In November of that same year, Afisha wrote about the band's style:

Homespun rock — that’s roughly how you could describe their style. The daring and sweeping spirit here go hand in hand with a peculiar humility, hot-bloodedness with a detachment. Behind the initial impression that this is just another post-punk band with vocals that seem to come from the depths, there’s definitely something more.

=== 2014–2016 ===
In January 2014, Srub held its first acoustic concert in Novosibirsk, featuring guest musicians, including guitarist Konstantin Pritychenko, who later joined the band.

In March 2014, the band released its self-titled debut album, Srub. That same year, one of Srub's tracks. "Len'" ("Laziness") was featured on a compilation celebrating the 10th anniversary of the Polish label Bunkier Productions.

In 2014, Kulikov left the project for personal reasons. However, in an August interview, when asked about upcoming electric performances, Shapransky stated: "…Srub is ready. There will be concerts."

In November 2014, designer and photographer Gosha Rubchinskiy traveled to Novosibirsk for an Afisha cover photo session featuring the band, accompanied by an interview with them titled "In Search of the Russian Soul".

In 2015, Rossiyskaya Gazeta dubbed Srub the most prominent representatives of the new wave of Siberian rock music, while Vice mentioned them in an article dedicated to the new generation of Russian indie artists, noting their ability to blend pagan aesthetics with possible influences from British bands Bauhaus and Joy Division.

In the summer of 2015, headlined at the "Bol'" ("Pain") music festival in Moscow. In the summer of 2016, Srub performed at the international Folk Summer Fest. After the festival, keyboardist Elizaveta Shapranskaya (Shapransky's first wife) left the band.

In the autumn of 2016, Shapransky moved to Saint Petersburg, where he met producer Gleb Godunov, who soon became the band’s manager. In the same year, Srub released the album Eres' ("Heresy").

=== 2017–2019 ===
In May 2017, after concerts in Saint Petersburg and Novosibirsk, the original lineup of Srub disbanded — the sole constant member of the project remained Shapransky, with other members joining on a rotating basis.

In June 2017, a documentary film dedicated to the band, titled Za Kukushkoyu Cherez Les ("Following the Cuckoo Through the Forest"), was released. The film was made by the band's former bassist Stanislav Kulikov, for whom it served as his film school graduation project.

In the autumn of 2017, Shapransky combined his concert performances with the Krasnoyarsk post-black metal band Ultar, whose members participated as session musicians in Srub's live lineup.

In the winter of 2018, Srub released its first fully acoustic album, Skorb' ("Sorrow"). It debuted during a series of joint concerts with the Danish neofolk project Of the Wand & the Moon. For these performances, Shapransky was joined by bassist Mikhail Karpov and drummer Andrey Strigotsky from the St. Petersburg rock band para bellvm, as well as guitarist Artyom Ionov from Postnoir.

In the spring and autumn of 2018, Shapransky again performed on tour with members of Ultar. In the autumn, Srub released the album Post.

In the summer of 2019, Srub performed at Nashestvie, Russia’s largest open-air rock festival.

In late 2019, Srub released the concept album 988. Its title refers to the year of the Christianization of Kievan Rus'. The album featured contributions from the bands Ultar and Grima, and was mixed by Vladimir Lekhtinen from the band Second To Sun.

In 2019, Shapransky moved to Prague.

=== 2020–2022 ===
In the spring of 2020, the COVID-19 pandemic forced Shapransky to return to Novosibirsk, where he reassembled the lineup.

In May 2020, Srub released the single Upokoy ("Rest"), from their then-upcoming album. The track combined Srub's neofolk and post-punk sound with black metal and progressive rock influences. Two more singles were released in the autumn: the post-punk Nikogda ne videt' zla ("To Never See Evil") and black metal Za zovom zari ("Following the Call of Dawn").

By the end of 2020, Srub performed an online concert.

In June 2021, Srub released the album Skverna ("Defilement"). The album featured several heavy tracks that blended the band's established lyrical themes and post-punk elements with modern black metal and folk instruments. Jaroslav Celuiko from the Czech post-black metal band Chernaa played an active role in the recording of the album. The album was crowdfunded on Planeta.ru, raising more than the target amount.

On 23 July 2021, Srub was scheduled to perform a black metal set at the Metal Over Russia 2021 festival, but due to pandemic-related restrictions, the event was postponed to the summer 2022.

In the autumn of 2021, the band embarked on a large-scale month-long tour titled "Do gorizonta zemli" ("To the Edge of the Earth") in support of their new black metal album, spanning 21 cities throughout Russia.

In the winter of 2022, Srub announced a new album titled Very piry ("Feasts of Faith"), calling it "a new page in the band’s history." To promote the album, the band planned a concert each in St. Petersburg and Moscow. Very piry was released on 22 May. The recording featured members of the Omsk neofolk band Nytt Land.

In the summer of 2022, Srub held a solo acoustic online forest concert in the Novosibirsk Oblast.

In the autumn, the band held a short tour titled "Besy" ("Demons") to promote their new album, consisting of nine concerts.

By the end of 2022, the band's Novosibirsk lineup encountered difficulties participating in long tours for a number of reasons and mutually decided to leave the band.

=== 2023–present ===
In the winter and spring of 2023, Srub reassembled with musicians based in Saint Petersburg. Among the new members was Ilya Fedoseenko.

To mark the band’s tenth anniversary, a major anniversary tour across Russian cities, from Kaliningrad to Vladivostok, was announced for the spring of 2023.

In the summer of 2023, Srub recorded their tenth anniversary album, titled 10. Georgy Leonidze, a drummer who previously played in the band Troll Bends Fir, contributed drums. The album was released on 7 September 2023. At around the same time, the band headlined the gothic festival Moscow Dark Fest, the independent indie music festival Motherland Fest, and Fort NovoRock.

From September to November 2023, the band successfully completed their most extensive tour, spanning two months and covering 32 cities. During the break between the European and Asian legs of the tour, Shapransky and Fedoseenko retreated to the former's log cabin near Novosibirsk to work on new material.

In February 2024, Srub released a collaborative single with the post-hardcore band Yermak! titled "Rusy valyat reptiloidovё" ("The Russians Kill the Reptilians"), intended for the soundtrack of the independent hack and slash video game Lizards Must Die by Agafonoff and Smola Game Studio.

In the spring of 2024, the St. Petersburg drummer and sound engineer Ivan Griboedov, who previously played alongside singer Grechka and in the bands Shchenki, RSAC, and Chernikovskaya Hata, joined Srub's permanent lineup.

In March 2024, Srub released the single "Lyuto lyubit'" ("To Love Fiercely").

In the summer of 2024, after a year of searching, bassist Vladimir "KAMAZ" Kalmazan joined the band.

In late August 2024, Srub released a new studio album, Dni urozhaia ("Days of Harvest"). The album’s material is dedicated to the theme of harvest and the cyclical nature of life, and its online release coincided with the end of summer.

In September and October, the band embarked on the "Dni urozhaia" tour to support the new album, presenting an updated setlist and spanning several Russian cities.

== Style and themes ==
The band's sound is based on post-punk, with Shapransky admitting that this genre is the foundation of the band's sound. Many songs also feature instruments characteristic for folk music, such as bowed strings, flute, accordion, Gusli (a traditional Russian zither-like instrument), and even elements like church bell chimes in certain tracks. Early releases also feature elements of coldwave, doom metal, and dark folk. In later works, the band experimented with a heavier sound, even going so far as to use black metal-style screams and guitar distortion. Critics often emphasize features such as "chthonic rawness, gloom, and paganism" as key stylistic descriptors.

Srub's lyrics are written exclusively in Russian, with Shapransky saying:

For me, Srub isn't about stories about crazed devils. It is the devils. And if a foreigner, for instance, has never walked muddy paths through the weeds at dusk, he will never see these devils in the music. And anyone who does see them, he speaks Russian quite well. I'm sure of it. It's like country music in Russian. It's mindless for me. Impossible."

— Igor Shapransky, Interview for Afisha-Volna, 2013

The only folkloric character that frequently appears explicitly in Srub's music the chert (devil). Many of the lyrics contain pagan and occult themes. This aesthetic was influenced by Shapransky’s personal interests: since childhood, he has been a fan of Alexander Blok's poetry.

Shapransky notes that, in addition to post-punk, Srub's sound was influenced by 1980s synth-pop, doom metal, early gothic rock, and late Soviet rock. His favorite Russian bands are Utro (a side project of Motorama), Kalinov Most, and Alisa. Non-Russian critics have noted similarities between Srub's sound and classic gothic rock: for example, the Viceland music documentary series Noisey noted Srub's inspiration by Bauhaus and Joy Division.

== Discography ==
=== Studio albums ===
- Сруб (2014)
- Хтонь (2015)
- Песни злых цветов (2016)
- Ересь (2016)
- Скорбь (acoustic, remake, 2018)
- Пост (2018)
- 988 (2019)
- Скверна (2021)
- Веры пиры (2022)
- 10 (remake, 2023)
- Дни урожая (2024)

=== Extended plays and singles ===
- По грибы (2013)
- Живица (2013)
- Природы ради снисхождения из-под паутины песни (2014)
- Тайной тропой (2014)
- Юдоль (2014)
- Безымянный (2016)
- Восход (2017)
- Упокой (2020)
- За зовом зари (2020)
- Никогда не видеть зла (2020)
- Восвояси (2023)
- Люто любить (2024)

=== Compilations ===
- Топь (2014)
- Тень (2015)
- Туман (2015)
- Иные (2019)

=== Other ===
- Не знать вины (feat. «почему коммутатор молчит», 2014)
- Безмолвие (feat. «почему коммутатор молчит», 2015)
- Через плечо переплюнув мечты (feat. MistFolk, 2022)
- Русы валят рептилоидов (feat. Ермак!, 2024)
- Дни урожая (feat. Бранимир, 2024)

=== Music videos ===
- Сердце (2018)
- След в след (2018)
- Помни (2018)
- До горизонта земли (2018)
- 988 (2019)
- Шёпот и вой болот (live, 2024)
- Люто любить (2024)
