= The Ice Cream Show =

2018 American television series

- Genre: Documentary
- Country of origin: United States
- Original language: English
- No. of episodes: 10

Original release
- Release: April 24, 2018

The Ice Cream Show is a television series about ice cream. It premiered on Viceland in 2018.

== Episodes ==
No.	Title	Original release date
1	"How to Succeed in Ice Cream"	April 24, 2018
2	"The Ice Cream Diet"	May 1, 2018
3	"Garden State Licks"	May 8, 2018
4	"LA's World of Ice Cream"	May 15, 2018
5	"The Best of NYC"	May 22, 2018
6	"Ice Cream Truck Treats"	May 29, 2018
7	"Italians Do It Better"	June 5, 2018
8	"Farm to Cone"	June 12, 2018
9	"The Cool History of Ice Cream"	June 19, 2018
10	"California Creamin'"	June 26, 2018

== See also ==
- List of programs broadcast by Viceland
