= While the Rest of Us Die: Secrets of America's Shadow Government =

2020 American documentary television series

- Genre: Documentary
- Based on: Raven Rock: The Story of the U.S. Government's Secret Plan to Save Itself—While the Rest of Us Die by Garrett M. Graff
- Narrated by: Jeffrey Wright
- Country of origin: United States
- Original language: English
- No. of seasons: 2
- No. of episodes: 14

Production
- Executive producers: Shawn Efran; Garrett Graff; Lee Hoffman; Anthony Lappé; Jordan J. Mallari; Solly Granatstein
- Producers: David McDougall; James Ellis
- Production company: Efran Films

Original release
- Network: Vice TV
- Release: November 16, 2020 – December 16, 2021

While the Rest of Us Die: Secrets of America's Shadow Government is a Vice on TV documentary television series exploring twentieth-century and twenty-first-century continuity of government (COG) measures of the United States federal government, the social, racial, and class inequalities these measures point to, the changing and inconsistent meanings of the concepts of "defense" and "homeland security", and the costs of COG infrastructure and maintenance to the United States federal budget. The series debuted November 16, 2020.

The series was inspired by the 2017 book Raven Rock: The Story of the U.S. Government's Secret Plan to Save Itself—While the Rest of Us Die by Garrett M. Graff. The Raven Rock Mountain Complex providing a title for the book is a nuclear bunker in Southern Pennsylvania intended to serve as a secondary Pentagon in case of the destruction or disabling of the primary headquarters in Washington, D.C. and is also discussed in the television documentary series. The series is narrated by American actor Jeffrey Wright.

== Episodes ==
Season	Episodes	Originally released	
Season	Episodes	First released	Last released
1	6	November 16, 2020	December 21, 2020
2	8	October 21, 2021	December 16, 2021

=== Season 1 (2020) ===
No. overall	No. in season	Title	Original release date
1	1	"Doomsday & The President"	November 16, 2020
Cold War disaster planning by the government and how these preparations led to conspiracy theories
2	2	"C.O.G. Clusterf***"	November 23, 2020
Weaknesses in continuity of government planning, and priorities other than ensuring the function of government, are exposed during the September 11 attacks; the nuclear bunker for the United States Congress beneath The Greenbrier resort in West Virginia, also known as Project Greek Island
3	3	"The Enemy Within"	November 30, 2020
Disparities in planning and response to disasters such as the devastation of New Orleans by Hurricane Katrina in 2005 emphasize and reinforce racial inequality in the United States
4	4	"National Insecurity"	December 7, 2020
The involvement of the United States in post–Cold War era conflicts appears to imperil the average US citizen and members of the military services rather than provide security
5	5	"Collapse"	December 14, 2020
Preparing for infrastructure attacks with electromagnetic pulse weapons and other methods and for breakdown of critical infrastructure due to anthropogenic climate change and widespread natural disasters; During economic catastrophe lenders and financial and real estate industries are able to increase profits in both relative and absolute terms while the standard of living for average Americans suffers enough to diverge from the rest of the developed world; "Elite Anxiety", the wealthy and upper-classes version of the "prepper" survivalism phenomenon, such as the documented New Zealand refuge planning of German-American billionaire financial and surveillance tech entrepreneur, venture capitalist, and pro-Trump political activist Peter Thiel; Interplanetary colonization plans by billionaire aerospace, alternative energy, and tech entrepreneur Elon Musk as an extreme and impractical form of elite anxiety
6	6	"Legacy of Lies"	December 21, 2020
National security propaganda related to the twenty-first century American invasion of Iraq; further discussion of conspiracy theories such as the 9/11 Truth movement and Barack Obama citizenship conspiracy theories; the QAnon conspiracy theory movement, its use of antisemitic canards, and parallels to Millenarianism and pareidolia; the "post-truth" concept; the interaction of government security interests, conspiracy theories, and the goals of the first Trump administration during the events of 2020, particularly the COVID-19 pandemic; the Milgram experiment and related study of amorality

=== Season 2 (2021) ===
No. overall	No. in season	Title	Original release date
7	1	"The Game Is Rigged"	October 21, 2021
8	2	"Food Kills"	October 28, 2021
9	3	"Killing Power"	November 4, 2021
10	4	"Toxic Wasteland"	November 11, 2021
11	5	"Nuke Nightmares"	November 18, 2021
12	6	"Pandemic Profiteers"	December 2, 2021
13	7	"Radical Religion"	December 9, 2021
14	8	"The Real Drug Lords"	December 16, 2021
