= Beerland =

Television series

- No. of seasons: 3
- No. of episodes: 17

Original release
- Network: Viceland
- Release: April 27, 2017 – June 26, 2018

Beerland is a television series about beer broadcast by Viceland starring Meg Gill.

== See also ==
- List of programs broadcast by Vice on TV
