= Boys and Girls Alone =

British reality television programme

- Genre: Reality Television
- Directed by: Mark Henderson & Martin Fuller
- Country of origin: England
- Original language: English
- No. of series: 1
- No. of episodes: 4

Production
- Production location: Hertfordshire
- Running time: 49 minutes
- Production company: Love Productions

Original release
- Network: Channel 4
- Release: February 2009

Boys and Girls Alone is a British reality TV programme made for Channel 4 and first broadcast in 2009. The programme saw a group of children, made up of both boys and girls aged between eight and eleven, attempt to live alone. While there were adult crew members on set, the children were ultimately left to their own devices and the adults would only intervene in extreme circumstances.

== Synopsis ==
The show, featuring ten boys and ten girls aged between eight and eleven years old, was filmed on location in Cornwall. The children were left to look after themselves for two weeks housed in Cornish cottages. The show was described as a social experiment.

There were 4 episodes aired on Channel 4 weekly between 3 February 2009 and 24 February 2009.

== Controversy ==
The series attracted considerable press attention over allegations of "child abuse and cruelty". A letter was signed and sent to Channel 4 and Ofcom by professionals, including psychologists and paediatricians, saying the programme had a "disturbing lack of understanding of how children develop psychologically, neurologically and socially". Cornwall's Children's Services Authority advocated for airing of the programme to be stopped and the then assistant director for social care and family services, Ruby Parry, said that the programme "[...] demeans and to some extent demonises children." As a result, the UK government has "ordered a review of child employment laws".

== See also ==
- Kid Nation - A 2007 U.S. television show that attracted similar controversy
- Lord of the Flies - 1954 British novel about boys on a deserted island and their descent into chaos
