= Dark Side of the 2000s =

Documentary television series

- Title card
- Genre: Documentary
- Developed by: Insight Productions Railsplitter Pictures
- Narrated by: Mark McGrath
- Original language: English
- No. of seasons: 1
- No. of episodes: 10

Original release
- Network: Vice TV
- Release: July 18 – September 12, 2023

Dark Side of the 2000s (rendered as “Dark Side of the 2000's” on the title card) is a docuseries involving popular culture in the 2000s.

== Episodes ==
No.	Title	Original release date
1	"Jon & Kate Plus 8: Family Circus"	July 18, 2023
Jon and Kate Gosselin, along with their eight children, have newfound success with their Jon & Kate Plus 8 reality show on TLC. The lines between fiction and reality are blurred when their real life divorce becomes a plot point for the show. Later, their subsequent child custody legal issues ends up in one of the kids being confined in secret.
2	"TRL: Last Request"	July 25, 2023
The MTV show Total Request Live (hosted by Carson Daly) has an instant impact on Millennial teens and the music industry. As Daly leaves TRL in 2003, the show tries to adapt to newer audiences while it also faces a threat on how people consume music: the Internet.
3	"Lindsay Lohan: Girl, Interrupted"	August 1, 2023
The rise and fall of former child actress Lindsay Lohan and the 24-hour gossip cycle that ate her alive.
4	"TMZ: Paparazzi Gone Wild"	August 8, 2023
The controversial paparazzi website TMZ expands from a small internet site to a media juggernaut, using questionable methods and tactics to report celebrity gossip. While it was praised for first reporting the death of Michael Jackson, it was also criticized for announcing Kobe Bryant's death in a helicopter crash before authorities did so.
5	"Shock Jocks: The Rise"	August 15, 2023
Howard Stern became one of the most popular radio celebrities with his show. His highly publicized feuds with the FCC and other shock jocks such as Opie and Anthony rise the stakes, until an incident in 2002 got the latter off the airwaves for two years.
6	"Shock Jocks: The Fall"	August 15, 2023
Satellite radio gave shock jocks a new opportunity to push the boundaries even further, as Opie & Anthony reignited their feud with Stern. As internet radio and podcasts took over as the primary method of audio listening, Stern dabbles into the mainstream while Opie and Anthony's relationship gets strained.
7	"The Bachelor: Every Rose Has Its Thorn"	August 22, 2023
Reality series The Bachelor becomes a ratings hit and spawns a media franchise, but its authenticity and treatment of contestants is also questioned.
8	"Charlie Sheen: Addicted To Winning"	August 29, 2023
The off-screen antics of Two and a Half Men co-star Charlie Sheen and his conflicts with series creator Chuck Lorre.
9	"Lad Mags: Men Behaving Badly"	September 5, 2023
British men's lifestyle magazines Loaded and FHM were a success to the male youth of the '90s, giving them the moniker of "Lad mags". Led by Felix Dennis, the US arrival of Maxim becomes a massive success in the 2000s while also harvesting a toxic and controversial legacy.
10	"Siegfried & Roy: Magic & Mayhem"	September 12, 2023
Siegfried & Roy became one of Las Vegas' most prominent acts by mixing magic with trained big cats, their lavish show makes them nationwide celebrities and gives them a millionaire contract with The Mirage. On October 3, 2003, a white tiger attacks Roy under conflicting circumstances, ending the duo's career.

== See also ==
- Dark Side of the 90s
- Dark Side of Reality TV
