= Meg Gill =

American entrepreneur and brewer (born 1985)

Margaret "Meg" Gill (born February 21, 1985) is an American entrepreneur and brewing executive. She co-founded Golden Road Brewing which became the largest craft brewery in Los Angeles County before its acquisition by AB InBev. Since 2020, Gill has served as vice president of marketing for Anheuser-Busch's craft beer division, the Brewers Collective. She hosted the Vice documentary series Beerland from 2017 to 2018.

== Early life and education ==
Gill grew up in Virginia, the youngest of three children. She attended Yale University, where she captained the women's swim team and set an Ivy League record with a 22.26-second freestyle relay leg. She graduated in 2007.

She became interested in craft brewing while training for the Olympic trials in swimming after she met Dale Katechis, owner of Oskar Blues Brewery in Lyons, Colorado. Injuries following an automobile accident ended her Olympic trials bid and accelerated her move into the brewing industry.

== Career ==
Gill co-founded Golden Road Brewery in Atwater Village with restauranteur Tony Yanow in 2011. The brewery became the largest craft brewery producer in Los Angeles County. In 2014, Gill was named to the Forbes "30 Under 30" list in the food and wine category. In 2015, Anheuser-Busch InBev announced it would acquire Golden Road for an undisclosed sum, their fifth craft brewery acquisition in five years.

In July 2020, Anheuser-Busch named Gill vice president of marketing for its craft beer division, the Brewers Collective, where she oversees marketing for thirteen popular craft breweries including Goose Island, Elysian, and others.

Gill hosted the documentary series Beerland on Vice which premiered in 2017. The series ran for three seasons.

== Recognition ==
- Forbes 30 Under 30 list in 2014 at 28 years old, featured food and drink honoree
- Wine Enthusiast's Top 40 Under 40 Tastemakers in 2014
- Golden Road Brewing and Gill honored as California Small Business of the Year for Los Angeles County, 2014; nominated by Assemblyman Gatto
- Golden Road Brewing and Gill honored as 2015 Blue Ribbon Small Business Award Winner by U.S. Chamber of Commerce, nominated for Small Business of the Year
