= Big Night Out =

2016 British TV series

- Genre: Documentary
- Directed by: Rhys James
- Creative director: Spike Jonze
- Starring: Clive Martin
- Country of origin: United Kingdom
- Original language: English
- No. of seasons: 2
- No. of episodes: 16

Production
- Executive producers: Spike Jonze, Shane Smith, Eddy Moretti, Al Brown, Yonni Usiskin
- Producer: Rhys James
- Production locations: United Kingdom, People's Republic of Donetsk, Ukraine, Romania, Ibiza, Greece, Holland
- Cinematography: Grant Armour, Owen Laird
- Running time: 60 minutes

Original release
- Network: Viceland
- Release: September 2016 – present

Big Night Out is a television series airing on Viceland, hosted by journalist and Vice correspondent Clive Martin, who is traveling the world to discover how partying has become an act of rebellion, subsistence or survival for young people everywhere.

== History ==
Big Night Out started as a written series of articles in 2012 on vice.com, written by Vice writer and correspondent Clive Martin. Big Night Out transitioned to a short form video web series on VICE's newly launched music channel Noisey in 2013, and ran for eight episodes.

Moving back onto vice.com, Big Night Out had success moving onto longer form more investigative films exploring the relationship between nightlife and wider social and societal issues, with Locked Off garnering significant attention for its exploration of the UK's resurgent illegal rave scene.

In 2016, Viceland commissioned a full TV series to coincide with the UK channel launch. The first season premiered on September 29, 2016.

== Episodes ==
=== Web Series (Noisey) ===
Number	Title	Original Air Date
1	"Gabber : The Evil EDM"	August 8, 2013
2	"Psytrance Rave In A Forest"	August 22, 2013
3	"Drum N Bass : The Scene That Refuses To Die"	September 5, 2013
4	"The Drunken Student Disco"	September 19, 2013
5	"The Metal Night"	October 7, 2013
6	"RIP Indie"	October 18, 2013
7	"Do Brits Get Hip Hop?"	February 4, 2014
8	The People VS Big Night Out	November 14, 2013

=== VICE Web Series ===
Title	Original Air Date
"Ibiza: Spring Breakers Of Europe"	October 2, 2014
"Locked Off : Illegal Raves In The UK"	May 23, 2016

=== Season 1: VICELAND ===
Clive Martin DJs with a refugee in Greece, obeys curfew in war-torn Ukraine and investigates police crackdowns on nightclubs in the UK. Witnessing partying as more than an act of rebellion, it's an act of survival.

Number	Title	Original Air Date
1	"Rave In The Rebel State (Ukraine)"	September 19, 2016
2	"Purgatory In Paradise (Greek Islands)"	September 27, 2016
3	"Bastards Of The Bible Belt (Holland)"	October 4, 2016
4	"Dancing On The Devil's Isle (Ibiza)"	October 11, 2016
5	"Bolero Of The Balkans (Romania)"	October 18, 2016
6	"Locked Off (UK)"	October 25, 2016
