= List of Kid Nation episodes =

This is a list of episodes for the CBS reality television show Kid Nation.

== Episodes ==
=== "I'm Trying to be a Leader Here!" ===
| # | Title |
| 1 | "I'm Trying to be a Leader Here!" (Days 1-4) |
|---|---|
| Description | Forty kids from across America arrive in Bonanza City for 40 days and are immediately struck by the lack of comforts in their new home. Friendships emerge and teamwork ensues, issues arise and the first Town Council convenes. The first Gold Star, worth $20,000 (equivalent to $31,000 in 2025), is awarded on the series premiere. |
| Showdown | The districts had one hour to fill three large bottles with their own district-colored water by carrying oil gushers to certain spouts on the ground. All four teams completed the task in the allotted time. The Town Council chose seven more outhouses over an old fashioned television. |
| Gold Star | Sophia: The Town Council recognized Sophia's work ethic in the kitchen. It was a fairly easy decision for the Council, despite Sophia's voicing of complaints over what she saw as problems in the kitchen. |
| Exits | Jimmy: Being the youngest contestant, Jimmy became homesick and decided to leave Bonanza, even though Cody, Laurel, and Campbell tried to convince him to stay. His decision came after three days of debate over his abilities versus what was expected of him. |

=== "To Kill or Not to Kill" ===
| # | Title |
| 2 | "To Kill or Not to Kill" (Days 5-7) |
|---|---|
| Description | Bonanza City deals with its first crisis as temperatures plunge and the water supply freezes. As the town debates whether or not to kill chickens for protein, a group of kids protests by locking the chickens—and themselves—in the coop but they kill 2 chickens. The Town Council find themselves in a tense stalemate as they debate between two possible recipients for the Gold Star. |
| Showdown | The kids had to build a pipeline between an active water pump and a water wheel with various obstacles put in their way. Green was the only team that didn't finish in the 1 hour time limit, and the reward which was either a giant water slide or conveniently placed water pumps designed not to freeze was not awarded. |
| Gold Star | Michael: Michael won the Gold Star because of his caring behavior toward others and generous spirit. Michael was chosen over the other leading contender Greg, who Mike suspected was motivated only by the prize money and not by any viable qualities or contributions to the town. |
| Exits | No exits. Emilie considered leaving after the town killed the chickens and because she felt homesick and an outsider, but decided to stick it out because she wanted to be a "tough cowgirl". |

=== "Deal with It!" ===
| # | Title |
| 3 | "Deal with It!" (Days 8-10) |
|---|---|
| Description | Prosperity leads to trouble when the Kids spend their newly earned buffalo nickels on sweets and party the night away, unable to easily awake for work the next morning. The Council institutes a little law and order when they set a town curfew to curb the Kids' partying. |
| Showdown | The districts had 5 minutes to find three ace cards attached to certain sheep in a corral, and all four teams completed the task within that time. The Town Council chose a microwave with a barrel of cocoa over 40 hot pizzas, leading to anger from the residents who wanted pizza. However, it was later accepted that having a microwave was better than pizzas. |
| Gold Star | Mallory: Mallory won the Gold Star for her overall contributions to Bonanza City. Her hard work as a merchant and her constant optimistic attitude were praised by the Town Council, who also chose to give the star to Mallory for her birthday. Laurel in particular felt that the contributions from the town's younger kids had been overshadowed during the first seven days, and giving the Gold Star to Mallory was a way to rectify this. Mallory won out over contenders Morgan and Greg, who Taylor campaigned hard for. |
| Exits | No exits. Both Cody and Mallory had expressed homesickness and wanted to go home, but both decided to stay as Cody didn't want to leave his friends and Mallory had Olivia to stick up to her. |

=== "Bless Us and Keep Us Safe" ===
| # | Title |
| 4 | "Bless Us and Keep Us Safe" (Days 11-13) |
|---|---|
| Description | Religious and political strife come to Bonanza City when the Council dictates that all of the Kids attend a religious group service. When no one apart from the Council Leaders turns up to the service, the Council Leaders are left disappointed. As Kids of different faiths bicker with each other, it seems as though the town might fracture until Morgan unites the arguing groups by holding a relaxed town bonfire where Kids of different faiths bond together in common prayer. |
| Showdown | The pioneers had 30 minutes to build a puzzle in the shape of a steeple onto a frame using squared-off pieces, then crank the puzzle to lift it upright. When all four teams finished in time, The Town Council decided to let the rest of the town vote on the reward, as they were worried that the town would be upset with the council's decision. The town chose a collection of holy books over a nine-hole miniature golf course. |
| Gold Star | Morgan: Morgan won the Gold Star over contenders Greg and Zach for her friendliness and her successful, no-pressure establishment of a prayer time. Zach's nomination was rejected by a jealous Taylor, as Zach received praise for his hard work. Greg also had his nomination dismissed by Mike, who still did not believe Greg had become a positive presence in the town. |
| Exits | Cody: Sad and homesick, Cody missed his loved ones including his girlfriend, Ashley in Ohio and decided to leave. His friends, especially Campbell, were very upset following his departure. |

=== "Viva La Revolución!" ===
| # | Title |
| 5 | "Viva La Revolución!" (Days 14-16) |
|---|---|
| Description | It's time for Bonanza City to hold its first Town Council elections. Mike and Taylor struggle with the political process as eager kids vie for their Council seats. When political mudslinging escalates as Markelle rips Taylor's campaign posters in half, young Leila winds up in tears, and it's Greg that comforts her. |
| Showdown | The kids had 30 minutes to find seven pictures of US presidents and put them in chronological order. One at a time they would race into a field of piñatas and break one open to see if there was a picture inside it. If they found one, they would race back to give it to their council leader. If not, another person in the district would repeat the process. After seven pictures were found and put in order, the Council Leaders had to run up to a bell and ring it. The green team finished a split second before the yellow team, but they had their pictures in the wrong order. This allowed the yellow team to become the upper class for the second time. Laurel's green team managed to come in second for the first time. As a reward, the Town Council chose toothbrushes, toothpaste, mouthwash and floss over a party that would have included ribs, chicken, hamburgers and hot dogs. While many of the kids were upset with this choice, the Council realized the toothbrushes were something they all needed especially the kids with braces. |
| Gold Star | Greg: Greg was finally given the gold star for being a hard worker around Bonanza City, changing his typically negative attitude, and being a positive influence on the younger members. Taylor described him as an "older brother" to the little kids. |
| Exits | No exits. |
| Elections | On Day 16, Bonanza City held their first Town Council elections. Each district had an opportunity to choose one member to run against their existing council leader. Everyone was allowed to vote only for their own district.: Green District – Laurel (unopposed); Even though many on the green team have great leadership skills, no one was unhappy with the way Laurel had been running their district. Still, she was somewhat surprised when she found out no one would be running against her.: Blue District - Anjay (7) defeated Olivia (3); Olivia was defeated, earning only her own vote, a vote from her sister, Mallory, and one vote from Gianna, another district member.: Red District - Guylan (9) defeated Mike (1); Mike lost in a landslide defeat; he was the only one who voted for himself. At first, while the votes were being read, everyone was laughing in shocked disbelief. But then, after he picked himself up and stepped down, the whole district tried to comfort him.: Yellow District - Zach (5) defeated Taylor (4); As there are 5 girls in the yellow district, Taylor was confident that she had all their votes. It turned out Zach was able to persuade Randi to vote for him by suggesting that it might be best for everyone if someone else had a turn at being council leader. In addition, Markelle takes down Taylor's campaign posters to sabotage the district's efforts to keep Taylor in office. |

=== "Bonanza Is Disgusting!" ===
| # | Title |
| 6 | "Bonanza Is Disgusting!" (Days 17-19) |
|---|---|
| Description | While the new Town Council struggles to find a solution for Bonanza City's growing trash problem they also have to deal with Taylor now that she's been voted out of power. DK continues to work hard to build a Kid Nation, but he's growing tired of all of the petty squabbling and is seriously considering going home. |
| Showdown | The kids had 15 minutes to locate colored tin cans representative of their district in a large enclosure filled ankle-high with 1600 gallons of beans (as to hide the cans from direct view), and with 30 pigs wallowing in the enclosure. Only one kid from each district was allowed in at a time and they couldn't return until they found a can. The team that found the most cans in 15 minutes was awarded the upper class, and so forth for the other job classes. If all four districts accumulated at least 75 cans, they would be rewarded with either a choice of all the fresh fruits and vegetables they could eat or two dune buggies and an unlimited supply of gasoline to operate them. The goal was met, and the council selected the fruits and vegetables for the town given that their diets had consisted mostly of bland starches and canned goods. |
| Gold Star | DK: DK was shown to be hard working around Bonanza and had always helped to break up and manage altercations between the other kids, and the choice was unanimous among the four council members. |
| Exits | No exits. Taylor wanted to leave due to the pressure the council was giving her while DK initially accepted the offer to leave, citing stress from the emotional environment around town. Guylan, both out of friendship and concern that DK would miss out on the gold star, was able to talk to DK and encouraged him to stay. |

=== "The Root of All Evil" ===
| # | Title |
| 7 | "The Root of All Evil" (Days 20-22) |
|---|---|
| Description | Life is hard in Bonanza City, but a handful of candy or a root beer in the Saloon is sure to brighten a young Pioneer's day. But buffalo nickels are scarce to come by, and the Kids are forced to come up with creative ways to earn a little extra cash…leading to conflict as they compete for customers. When the Council members discover treasure while exploring a nearby mine, will the unexpected windfall create a divide between the haves and the have-nots? |
| Showdown | Districts were to launch golden eggs using a large slingshot to be caught on the opposite side of a partition in the middle of a field, each team attempting to catch as many eggs as possible in 15 minutes. Each district assigned two members to a large cushion to catch the eggs, a third member to carry the caught eggs to a chest, and the district's council member, set on the partition, was to guide the catchers to the location of the egg. The remaining district members rotated as egg launchers using the slingshot. The job classifications were based on the number of eggs caught by each district. Additionally, if the combined total of caught eggs exceeded 48, the town would receive a choice between either electric washers and dryers that cost 20 cents per load, or hand-operated washers that were free to use as well as a single change of clothes for each child. The blue district almost single-handedly achieved the goal, collecting 38 eggs, which was more than twice as many eggs as the 2nd place yellow team caught. The council decided on the hand-operated washers and additional clothes. |
| Gold Star | Nathan: Nathan was generally considered to be a very dedicated worker, and had in fact been told by several of the council members to stop working so hard and to relax. Greg, with whom Nathan was seen as having a hostile relationship, gave him a boost toward the Gold Star by recommending him for the award to the town council. |
| Exits | No exits. Although Nathan remarked, "For half a second...I considered leaving..." he decided not to. |

=== "Starved for Entertainment" ===
| # | Title |
| 8 | "Starved for Entertainment" (Days 23-25) |
|---|---|
| Description | The all-work-and-no-play Pioneer lifestyle is making the town a gloomy place. As Bonanza's inhabitants become ever more starved for entertainment, thoughts increasingly turn toward home. The Town Council hatches a plan to brighten spirits: a town talent show giving the pioneers the chance to show off their talents in front of their peers. |
| Showdown | The kids were given an hour to chew numerous pieces of gum dispensed from nearby gumball machines. Finished pieces were given to the council leaders, who were to stick the colored gum on the appropriately marked areas of a large picture. The green team came in first place for the first time ever, however the yellow team could not complete their picture in the required amount of time, so the town was not given a reward that would have included a choice of either buckets of colored paint that could be used to liven up the dreary colors of Bonanza City or a citywide block party for the general entertainment of the town. |
| Gold Star | Kennedy: Kennedy was shown as a person who both worked hard and interacted well with the other members of the town. Her successful performance in the talent show, outgoing personality, and her cordial relationships with others convinced many that she deserved recognition for her contributions to Bonanza City. Kennedy was also largely credited with convincing Savannah to stay. |
| Exits | No exits, although Savannah considered leaving after claiming she was homesick. She was persuaded to stay after Kennedy performed her rapping/dancing act during the talent show and the town members expressed their desire for her to continue. |

=== "Not Even Close to Fair" ===
| # | Title |
| 9 | "Not Even Close to Fair" (Days 26-28) |
|---|---|
| Description | Resentment over the apparent inequality in the strength of each district is brewing as the Green District suggests it should be renamed the "Gold District" after earning half the Gold Stars. Guylan learns the hard lesson of thinking before speaking when he says his District is in need of intellectuals, making his infuriated District feel dumb. After the town prize isn't won at the showdown, Guylan accuses the other districts of being selfish, infuriating Sophia, Greg, and many others. A shocking announcement at the Town Hall meeting threatens explosive fireworks among several of the Kids. |
| District Reassignments | Due to the Journal's suggestion this week, some of the districts decided to mix up their members. Blaine was moved from Blue to Yellow because Zach wanted some "manpower" on his team and Anjay wanted to separate Greg and Blaine because "bad things happen" when they are together. Emilie was traded to the blue team for Nathan because Guylan wanted someone who was smart and works hard and Anjay wanted to prove he has some leadership skills by getting Emilie to work harder since she'd started to become lazy recently. Laurel didn't want to change her district at all because she considers hers to be the closest-knit group and didn't want to disturb it. Many in the town were upset over the changes especially because they were seen as unnecessary and unfair. |
| Showdown | The new teams ran a rock-hauling race. Rocks were placed in mining carts to be hauled through an obstacle course. Teams could either carry fewer rocks and have a greater chance at gaining upper class or haul more than their share to work towards the town prize while potentially sacrificing their individual job class. The town needed to haul one ton of rocks in order to earn the reward, but the tally came up short, and they missed out on the town reward for the second time in a row. The lost reward was a choice of beds for the entire town or a "Kid Lounge" trailer. |
| Gold Star | Blaine: Blaine, now in his new yellow district, was able to shine out from under Greg's shadow. His performance helped the yellow team make it across the finish line second in the mine cart race and gave them the necessary motivation and assistance to more effectively complete their jobs in Bonanza City. |
| Exits | Randi: Despite the comforting efforts of Taylor and Greg, Randi became homesick, and ultimately decided to leave Bonanza. Her decision was reached after two nights and much ribbing by other members of the town. |

=== "Let Me Talk!" ===
| # | Title |
| 10 | "Let Me Talk!" (Days 29-31) |
|---|---|
| Description | The Town Council creates a game meant to improve communication and build respect, but gets heat from the Town for being disrespectful themselves. The Town Council responds by threatening to give the Gold Star to no one. Meanwhile, Greg and Blaine spy on the Green District bashing them, and they are not pleased with what they hear. After a series of confrontations, Greg makes the Town an offer—if more than half the Town wants him to go home, he will pack up and leave Bonanza forever. The Kids refused and wanted Greg to change. After hearing a word from Jonathan, Greg apologizes for his behavior and promises to try to change. |
| Showdown | The citizens of Bonanza ran a pie race. Pies were hoisted to the top of a tower where a district member would place it on top of two "pie holders" held by two more district members balancing on beams. The pie holding members had to balance the pie and transport it across the beams to another tower where another district member would take it and slide it down a chute to the district's council member below. The council leader then had to dig to the bottom of the pie to uncover a picture of a mode of communication: telegraph, telephone, typewriter, etc. and put the pies in chronological order according to the invention date of the mode of communication. The town won the reward: a choice of four ponies or letters from home. The town council considered the ponies because they thought if they chose the letters, kids might become very homesick and leave Bonanza. After a very hard decision, the council chose the letters. Despite the council's decision to deny Taylor any rewards, they gave her her letter in exchange for a promise that she would work harder in the future. |
| Gold Star | Laurel: While the new town council threatened not to give out a gold star, they decided to recognize Laurel's hard work throughout the first 28 days of Bonanza's town council. |
| Exits | No exits, although several kids intimated that they might leave. Taylor once again threatened to leave after DK and the town council brought pressure to bear on her for lack of work. Both Zach and Laurel contemplated leaving after the seemingly disastrous way in which the new town council was operating. At the town council meeting, Greg, fed up with the town's dissatisfaction, offered to leave if more than 50% of the town voted him out. |
| Elections | On Day 28, Bonanza City held their second Town Council elections. Election rules were the same as for the previous election, although this time the entire process - from the announcement that there would be an election to the election itself - took place within a single town hall meeting. An entirely new town council was elected.: Green District – Michael (6) defeated Laurel (3); Michael decided that he wanted to develop his leadership skills and so decided to run against Laurel.: Blue District - Greg (7) defeated Anjay (2); Anjay was defeated after receiving only his and Alex's votes.: Red District - DK (unopposed); Guylan did not attempt to run, asking the town to vote him off the council.: Yellow District - Blaine (5) defeated Zach (4); Blaine promised to motivate the town more than the current town council and won by a narrow majority. |

=== "I Just Like the Recess Part" ===
| # | Title |
| 11 | "I Just Like the Recess Part" (Days 32-34) |
|---|---|
| Description | The Town Council issues Taylor an ultimatum: work or don't share in any Town rewards and watch as the other Kids reap the benefits. Taylor is still refusing to work after promising to start working harder in the last episode as she remains adamant about not liking to be bossed around. The Town Council swears to withhold any reward they may win from her no matter what it is this time. However, Zach, her former opponent, becomes her unlikely motivator by treating her with respect. Meanwhile, the council appoints Sophia as the first "town sheriff" when everyone else in town starts shirking their duties also. They chose Sophia because she's responsible. |
| Showdown | The citizens of Bonanza City were given a literal pop quiz. Each district was given time to study a pamphlet detailing the history of Bonanza City. Jonathan then asked the town questions based on it and three answers were printed on balloons behind him. The districts answered by using a slingshot to pop the two balloons with the incorrect answers. The first district to answer three questions correctly were the upper class, the second were the merchants and so on. The leftover ammunition from all the districts had to completely fill a jar for the town to win the reward. They were successful, and the reward was a choice between books for a library or a free video game arcade. For the first time, the council went with the "fun" option and chose the arcade. Taylor is initially denied entry but is later allowed in after working harder. |
| Gold Star | Hunter: Hunter's hard work was finally recognized by the council for the gold star. |
| Exits | No exits. The broadcast did not show anyone talking about leaving and, for the first time, the broadcast did not show Jonathan asking if anyone wanted to leave. It is also Michael's 15th Birthday. |
| Sheriff | A new leader was added to the town after the kids neglected their duties. The council appointed Sophia to help enforce the rules, giving her the title of town sheriff. Many of the kids were really upset at possibly having an unelected leader. Sophia, however, was honored at her new responsibility as sheriff. |

=== "Where's Bonanza, Dude?" ===
| # | Title |
| 12 | "Where's Bonanza, Dude?" (Days 35-37) |
|---|---|
| Description | The Town Council goes on an expedition beyond Bonanza City and meets with Native Americans, whose wisdom changed how the Council approached giving the Gold Star. Sheriff Sophia is left in charge of Bonanza City while the council was away to make sure everyone does their jobs before being allowed inside the arcade. With only a few days left, everyone realizes it's not going to be easy saying goodbye to their Bonanza City family, and they make a vow to make the most of the rest of their time there. |
| Showdown | Without the town council, the town had to run a race to build homesteads. With a nod to the Homestead Act, each district had a house, an alpaca, chickens and a flag to move from one end of a field to the other in 60 minutes. The first team to finish moving their homestead became the upper class. Each district completed their homestead, with the Yellow District finishing in the nick of time. The reward was a choice between a monument dedicated to Kid Nation or a ride in hot air balloons to allow the kids an aerial view of the product of their efforts over the past 36 days. Sophia had been appointed by the council to choose the reward and decided upon the hot air balloon rides. |
| Gold Star | Alex: Alex's hard work and intelligence were the determining factors in this episode's gold star award. |
| Exits | No exits. |
| Arcade | The Town Council shut down the video arcade permanently because of its service as a distraction from work, communication, and interaction with the other pioneers during their last days in Bonanza, though with some protest from other pioneers. |

=== "We've All Decided to Go Mad!" ===
| # | Title |
| 13 | "We've All Decided to Go Mad!" (Days 38-40) |
|---|---|
| Description | Series Finale. The kids wake up to see the job board burnt down and destroyed. The town then gathered around the job board with the show's host, who burned the journal after Mallory suggested it and the pioneers unanimously agreed. After that, many of the kids go chaotic, ignoring the protests from other kids. After raiding the town's dry good store, the pioneers come together as a group and clean up their mistakes. When Emilie takes her anger out on the Yellow District girls for not letting her sleep with them in their bunk, Migle steps in as an unlikely hero to calm Emilie down. After the showdown, the kids are finally reunited with their parents and share a town party with them. After the giving of three $50,000 (equivalent to $78,000 in 2025) gold stars, the pioneers say their goodbyes and leave the town they built forever. |
| Showdown | There was one final showdown for Bonanza city, but without individual districts. The town competed as a whole and had three tasks to complete: make dinner (pasta), build picnic tables, and take out the trash and subsequently bury it (the same task occurred in episode 6). The first task was made easier by the town council's decision in episode 3 to take the microwave. They had one hour to complete the three tasks. The reward for this showdown was three additional gold stars worth $50,000 each (equivalent to $78,000 in 2025). |
| Gold Star | Zach: Zach was the final $20,000 (equivalent to $31,000 in 2025) gold star winner. When faced with an impromptu decision, the town council recognized Zach's hard work and his attitude toward making Bonanza a better place. |
| Exits | Because this was the season finale, all children were going home, so no one was asked if they wanted to leave. |
| $50,000 (equivalent to $78,000 in 2025) Gold Stars | The town earned three big gold stars as the reward this week. Each was worth $50,000 (equivalent to $78,000 in 2025). The winners were: Sophia: Sophia was considered by the town council to be the most consistent hard worker in the town as well as the most consistent in attitude towards the community. The council noted that this was the easiest decision for them, as Sophia had been a constant hard worker and source of encouragement for the other kids. She had also won a $20,000 (equivalent to $31,000 in 2025) gold star in the first episode.; Morgan: Morgan was selected by the council for her attitude and helpfulness in uniting the community. Morgan had consistently played the role of a calming presence, and seemed to be the "big sister" for the entire town. She had also won a $20,000 (equivalent to $31,000 in 2025) gold star in the fourth episode.; Migle: The council recognized Migle as the most improved Bonanza citizen. |
