= Noisey (TV series) =

2016 American television documentary series

- Genre: Documentary
- Starring: Zach Goldbaum
- Countries of origin: United States, Canada
- Original language: English
- No. of seasons: 2
- No. of episodes: (list of episodes)

Production
- Running time: Approximately 60 minutes

Original release
- Network: Viceland
- Release: 29 February 2016 – 14 February 2017

Noisey is a 2016 American television documentary series hosted by Zach Goldbaum. The series premiered on 2 March 2016 on Viceland as part of its new programming launch. The series explores music cultures around the world, while discovering the problems that come with youth and crime that is involved with music. The series was renewed for a second season in 2016.

The series was preceded by 2014's Noisey: Chiraq and 2015's Noisey: Atlanta, which were hosted by Thomas Morton.

== Noisey: Chiraq (2014) ==
No.	Title	Featuring
1	Welcome to Chiraq	Chief Keef
2	Keef in NYC / Chiraq's New Kids	Chief Keef
3	Alien vs Predator vs Chief Keef	Chief Keef
4	Lil Durk Terrifies the City	Lil Durk, Lil Reese
5	Vic Mensa & SAVEMONEY Bust Joey Purp Outta Jail	Vic Mensa, SAVEMONEY, Joey Purp
6	Chop's Mom Drives Him Around the Nation's Murder Capital	Young Chop
7	How to Make it Out of Chiraq	
8	Chief Keef Takes the Suburbs	Chief Keef

== Noisey: Atlanta (2015) ==
No.	Title	Featuring
1	Welcome to the Trap	
2	Meet the Migos	Migos
3	Gucci Mane & Jeezy: Trap Lords	Coach K., Gucci Mane
4	Trouble with the ATL Twins	ATL Twins
5	Shots Fired in Little Mexico with Young Scooter & Gucci	Young Scooter, Gucci Mane
6	2 Chainz Up Close & Personal	2 Chainz
7	The Psychedelic and Bizarre World of iLoveMakonnen	iLoveMakonnen
8	Rich Gang: Sometimes You Win, Sometimes You Lose	
9	The Producers	
10	Peewee Longway's Playhouse	Peewee Longway, Young Thug

== Noisey (2016-2017) ==
=== Season 1 (2016) ===
No.	Title	Original airdate	Featuring
1	Bompton	February 29, 2016	Kendrick Lamar, Snoop Dogg
2	São Paulo	March 8, 2016	Major Lazer, MC Guimê, MC Bin Laden
3	Miami	March 15, 2016	Rick Ross, DJ Khaled, Gato Da Bato, Pouya, Fat Nick, Robb Banks, Stitches, Scott Storch, Denzel Curry, Gunplay
4	Chicago	March 22, 2016	Chief Keef, Vic Mensa, Young Chop, Lil Durk, Chief Wuk, Alki David, Common
5	Jamaica	March 29, 2016	Popcaan, Chronixx
6	Las Vegas	April 5, 2016	Steve Angelo, Wayne Newton, Justin Bieber, Tiesto
7	Detroit	April 12, 2016	Big Sean, Danny Brown, Trick-Trick, Dej Loaf, Doughboyz Cashout, Mike Melinoe, Bandgang, Dex Osama
8	London	April 19, 2016	Giggs, Skepta, Jammer, JME
9	Chicago: The City Speaks	April 26, 2016	
10	YG and the Therapist	June 12, 2016	YG

=== Season 2 (2017) ===
No.	Title	Original airdate	Featuring
11	Bay Area	January 10, 2017	G-Eazy, E-40, Nef the Pharaoh, Mistah F.A.B.
12	Nashville	January 17, 2017	Kesha, Jellyroll
13	Paris	January 24, 2017	Niska, MHD, Medine
14	Seoul	January 31, 2017	Big Bang
15	Atlanta	February 7, 2017	Migos, Killer Mike, 21 Savage, Metro Boomin, Lil Yachty, Jeezy, T.I., Young Thug
16	Lagos	February 14, 2017	Wizkid, Femi Kuti
