= Vice TV =

American pay television channel

- Country: United States
- Headquarters: Brooklyn, New York

Programming
- Language: English
- Picture format: 1080i (HDTV) (downgraded to letterboxed 480i for the SDTV feed)

Ownership
- Owner: Vice Media; A+E Global Media

History
- Launched: February 29, 2016; 10 years ago
- Replaced: H2
- Former names: Viceland (2016–19)

Links
- Website: www.vicetv.com

Availability

Streaming media
- Service(s): Frndly TV, Hulu + Live TV, Philo, Plex, Samsung TV Plus Sling TV, Tubi

Vice TV (also known as Vice on TV, or simply Vice, and formerly known as Viceland) is an American basic cable television channel that launched on February 29, 2016. It is a part of the Viceland family of television channels programmed by Vice Media. A joint venture with A+E Global Media, Vice replaced H2 on most multichannel television providers in the United States.

Vice originally operated under the creative direction of film director Spike Jonze, and had a focus on lifestyle-oriented documentary and reality series aimed towards millennials; including new original series, and adaptations and reruns of existing Vice web series. Amid low ratings, Vice began to retool the channel's programming in 2019 to focus more on news and documentary programming, and was brought under the Vice News division that August. The channel adopted its current name on December 2, 2019.

As of November 2023, Vice TV is available to approximately 45,000,000 pay television households in the United States-down from its 2015 peak of 74,000,000 households.

== History ==
=== As Viceland ===
==== Pre-launch ====
In August 2014, A&E Networks (a 50–50 joint venture between Hearst Communications and The Walt Disney Company) acquired a 10% stake in Vice Media. On November 3, 2015, A&E Networks officially announced that Vice would "take over" H2 and re-launch it as a new service, Viceland, "as early as" February 2016.

Viceland logo (2016–2019)

Vice Media CEO Shane Smith stated that the channel was the "next step in the evolution of our brand and the first step in our global rollout of networks around the world", signifying that Vice would now be "platform-agnostic" with the addition of television to Vice's traditionally digital media-oriented strategy, and be capable of producing high-quality media. In an interview with The Hollywood Reporter, Smith explained that, despite Vice traditionally being oriented towards digital content, "75 percent of the world's advertising budget" was being spent on television advertising, and that partnering with an established media company gave Vice access to A&E's infrastructure and the 70 million homes that already received H2, rather than having to build Viceland entirely from scratch and negotiate carriage with providers.

A&E Networks handles the distribution and operations of Viceland, and assists in advertising sales. Vice holds a 49% minority stake and control of international expansions. Smith stated that the network planned to "test new and innovative monetization strategies", including a goal for only 10 minutes of commercial advertising per-hour, and to leverage Vice's existing production capabilities and experience with native advertising to produce sponsored short-form content for advertisers to air in lieu of traditional commercials.

The Walt Disney Company, which co-owns A&E Networks with Hearst Corporation, made a second 10% investment of $200 million in Vice Media to support the production of new programming.

==== Early years and programming ====
Prior to launch day, Vice ran newspaper ads for Viceland, containing only the network's name and a phone number that, when called, invited viewers to contribute answers to questions. On February 29, 2016, at 6:00 am. ET, the channel began broadcasting a countdown clock to the official relaunch as Viceland later in the evening, accompanied by footage of Vice executives answering the viewer-contributed calls as voice mail. The network's first program following the official launch was the series premiere of Noisey, following hip-hop musician Kendrick Lamar. The network's launch lineup featured programs hosted by existing Vice personalities such as Action Bronson and Thomas Morton, as well as notable figures such as Eddie Huang, Elliot Page, (Note: Credited as Ellen Page) and Lance Bangs.

Viceland's programming initially consisted primarily of lifestyle-oriented documentaries and reality series aimed towards millennials, directed in Vice's trademark style of "character-driven documentaries". Creative director Spike Jonze stated that his goal for Viceland was to make its lineup have "a reason to exist and a strong point of view", rather than be just a "collection of shows". Jonze explained that Viceland would continue to reflect Vice's core mission of "trying to understand the world we live in by producing pieces about things we're curious about or confused about or that we think are funny. And if it doesn't have a strong point of view, then it shouldn't be on this channel." Smith stated that the channel's main goal was "trying not to be shitty". Viceland will focus primarily on lifestyle content; Vice News content will remain largely exclusive to Vice's existing joint venture with HBO. Jonze stated that unlike the HBO content, Viceland would be "far from objective [reporting]".

Thirty different programs were developed for Viceland, including original series and expanded versions of existing Vice web series. Original programs announced for the initial slate included Thomas Morton's Balls Deep, Flophouse— a series where Lance Bangs follows the lives of up-and-coming comedians at underground stand-up events, Fuck, That's Delicious— a television version of the food-oriented web series starring Action Bronson, Gaycation— a series in which Elliot Page explores the LGBT cultures of different regions, Huang's World— featuring Eddie Huang "exploring identity using food as an equalizer", King of the Road — a series following skaters on Thrasher Magazine's annual scavenger hunt, States of Undress— a series focusing on fashion weeks around the world, the music documentary series Noisey, Vice World of Sports, and Weediquette— which focuses on the mainstream cannabis culture and industry. Blocks of existing short-form content from Vice (Vice Lab) are also featured, along with other, acquired content— such as Friday-night airings of cult films accompanied by Vice Guide to Film documentaries on their directors. 10 of the 30 original programs planned were produced in Canada, including Cyberwar— which focuses on cyberterrorism, and Dead Set on Life— an expansion of Matty Matheson's food-oriented web series Keep It Canada.

A month after Viceland's initial launch, the network announced a second slate of shows, including Traveling the Stars: Action Bronson and Friends Watch ‘Ancient Aliens’—a series in which Action Bronson watches episodes of Ancient Aliens with guests whilst smoking marijuana, Black Market— a series in which Michael K. Williams explores underground economies around the world, the U.S. premieres of Cyberwar and Dead Set on Life, Party Legends— a show about re-enactments of entertaining party stories, WOMAN— a series in which Gloria Steinam features the lives of different women around the world, and VICE Does America— which Abdullah Saeed and two VICE co-workers explore forgotten places of the world.

Jonze stated that Viceland's original programs will have varying lengths, stating that "some are four episodes. Some are six. Some are eight. We're making everything based on what feels right", and that extended episodes may be possible if warranted.

On May 3, 2016, Vice announced a partnership with ESPN (a fellow Disney/Hearst venture) to produce sports-oriented content for its properties. The deal also includes some content-sharing between ESPN and Viceland, such as encore airings of ESPN's 30 for 30 documentaries on Viceland, and airings of Vice World of Sports on ESPN. In June 2016, Viceland broadcast live coverage of the Governors Ball Music Festival.

=== As Vice TV ===
==== Shift to news and documentaries ====
On February 24, 2019, the channel launched Vice Live, a two-hour live show airing Mondays through Thursdays at 9 p.m. The series was meant to anchor Viceland's primetime lineup and act as a replacement for Desus & Mero after that show's hosts moved to Showtime. Shortly after debuting, Vice Live was trimmed down to an hour and, due to low ratings, was eventually cancelled after its April 11, 2019 episode.

On April 10, 2019, Vice premiered the documentary series Dark Side of the Ring, which chronicles events and figures in professional wrestling. The series would go on to become the network's highest-rated and longest-running original series, spawning spin-offs focusing on other subjects such as football, mixed martial arts (Dark Side of the Cage), and specific decades in history.

In August 2019, Vice Media announced that the channel was merging with Vice News as a part of its shift from entertainment and lifestyle programming to a news-based lineup. Earlier that month, the company had also announced that Vice News Tonight, which aired on HBO from 2016 to 2019, would re-launch in 2020 on the network. At the end of the year, Viceland would change its name to Vice TV on December 2, 2019.

In April 2021, American professional wrestling promotion Major League Wrestling (MLW) announced a television deal with Vice TV. A block of MLW programming, including reruns of flagship show MLW Fusion, began airing on Saturdays starting May 1. On September 17, it was announced that Vice would air MLW's Fightland as a television special on October 7.

On May 15, 2023, Vice Media formally filed for Chapter 11 bankruptcy, as part of an eventual sale to a consortium of lenders including Fortress Investment Group, which will, alongside Soros Fund Management and Monroe Capital, invest $225 million as a credit bid for nearly all of its assets. The sale was closed in August 2023.

==== Shift to sports ====
In December 2024, it was reported that Vice TV would be placing a larger emphasis on its Vice Sports brand, introducing a primetime block on weeknights featuring sports-related programming. The block's slate for 2025 included college basketball documentary miniseries Calipari: Razor’s Edge (which was produced by Peyton Manning's Omaha Productions) and Pitino: Red Storm Rising, new seasons of series such as Dark Side of the Ring, and other acquisitions such as Arena Football One, The Draymond Green Show with Baron Davis, Nightcap with Shannon Sharpe, highlights of Red Bull-organized events and the PDC World Darts Championship, and reruns of American Ninja Warrior. As well as showing multiple BKB Bare Knuckle Boxing fight nights per year. In 2026, Vice TV added Major League Volleyball and the Legacy Fighting Alliance, a mixed martial arts promotion.

== Programming ==
Vice's current programming includes original documentary series (such as Dark Side of the Ring and its various spin-offs), and acquired reality shows, and film telecasts.

== Availability ==
=== Viewership ===
In August 2016, it was reported that average viewership of Vice TV's programming was down by nearly half over H2 (in a period from November 28 to December 15, 2016, the network had average primetime viewership of 58,000 in the 18–49 demographic, down from 95,600 one year prior under H2). However, the median demographics of the network were beginning to skew younger than H2, and some premieres had achieved upwards of 100,000 viewers. A&E Networks CEO Nancy Dubuc defended the numbers, stating that the network's goal was to "attract an audience that is not watching much TV," and that they were "trying to pivot the conversation away from just purely ratings"—noting that Viceland had already received several Emmy nominations for its programs within its first three months of operation.

Year-over-year, Vice TV lost 42% of its viewership in 2017 compared to 2016. It lost another 10% in 2018. By 2021, the channel was reported to be in 60 to 70 million households.

== FAST channel ==
In May 2021, Vice Media launched a free ad-supported streaming television (FAST) channel; it is drawn from former Vice TV series such as Huang's World, Noisey, and Vice Essentials. As of 2022, the channel is available on The Roku Channel, Samsung TV Plus and Tubi TV

== See also ==
- H2 (American TV channel)
