= Huang's World =

2016 multi-national documentary TV series

- Genre: Documentary
- Starring: Eddie Huang
- Countries of origin: United States, Canada
- Original language: English
- No. of seasons: 2
- No. of episodes: 18 (list of episodes)

Production
- Production locations: Jamaica; Sicily, Italy; Mexico; Orlando, Florida; France; Istanbul, Turkey; Hunan, China; Washington, D.C. Toronto, Canada; Japan; Hawaii; New York; Cape Cod, Massachusetts; South Korea
- Running time: Approximately 60 minutes

Original release
- Network: Viceland
- Release: 28 April 2016 – August 30, 2017

Huang's World is a 2016 American television documentary series hosted by Eddie Huang. The series premiered on 28 April 2016 on Viceland, a multinational brand of television channel owned by Vice Media. The series focuses on the concept of "exploring identity using food as an equalizer," as Huang travels around the world and experiences local culture and politics.

== Series overview ==
Season	Episodes	Season premiere	Season finale
1	8	April 28, 2016	June 16, 2016

Season	Episodes	Season premiere	Season finale
2	10	June 28, 2017	August 30, 2017

== Episodes ==
=== Season 1 ===
No. overall	No. in season	Title	Original release date
1	1	"Jamaica"	April 28, 2016
Eddie goes to Jamaica to learn about the country's economic struggles after its independence in 1962, and what it means to be free in a developing country
2	2	"Sicily"	May 5, 2016
Eddie heads to Sicily to discover the ancient Arabic and African influence on Sicilian culture and cuisine
3	3	"Borderlands"	May 12, 2016
Eddie travels along the northern border of Mexico to discover the dynamic between a developing country and a first-world super power
4	4	"Burgundy"	May 19, 2016
Eddie spends a weekend drinking wine and embracing the culture in Burgundy, France, and learns about the history of the region that makes some of the best wine
5	5	"Istanbul"	May 26, 2016
Eddie goes to Istanbul to eat the diverse food of the region, and ends up experiencing firsthand the changing religious landscape of a once cosmopolitan society.
6	6	"Orlando"	June 2, 2016
Eddie Huang goes home to Orlando to spend Chinese New Year with his family and reflect on how the bizarre culture in Orlando, Florida, has influenced his life and career
7	7	"Taiwan"	June 9, 2016
Eddie goes to his parents' homeland and explores the complex history of the Taiwanese people to try and understand his own cultural identity
8	8	"China"	June 16, 2016
Eddie goes to China with his parents to discover his heritage as a Taiwanese-Chinese-American, and to explore the most important dish of his life, red cooked pork.

=== Season 2 ===
No. overall	No. in season	Title	Original release date
1	9	"Washington, D.C."	June 28, 2017
Eddie goes to the capital city of United States during the Inauguration of Donald Trump
2	10	"Toronto"	July 5, 2017
Eddie discovers Toronto's diverse food scene and multiculturalism
3	11	"Japan"	July 12, 2017
Eddie goes to Japan to explore Japanese individualism and singularity
4	12	"Hawa'ii"	July 19, 2017
Eddie goes to Hawaii to discover identity in the margins
5	13	"New York"	July 26, 2017
Eddie goes to New York to introduce viewers to his New York friends and family
6	14	"Cape Cod"	August 2, 2017
Eddie goes to Cape Cod to explore monoculture and exclusionary vacation destinations
7	15	"South Korea"	August 9, 2017
Eddie goes to South Korea to discover South Korea's commoditization of culture as he eats his way through Seoul.
8	16	"Los Angeles"	August 16, 2017
Eddie goes to Los Angeles to explore health and wellness there.
9	17	"Peru"	August 23, 2017
Eddie goes to Peru to explore Peru's biodiversity
10	18	"Dubai"	August 30, 2017
Eddie goes to Dubai to explore Dubai's industrial revolution
