= Weediquette =

- Weediquette TV show poster
- Genre: Documentary, Drug, Science, Technology
- Creative director: Spike Jonze
- Starring: Krishna Andavolu
- Countries of origin: Canada; United States
- Original language: English
- No. of seasons: 3
- No. of episodes: 26

Production
- Running time: 30 mins

Original release
- Network: Viceland
- Release: February 29, 2016 – November 14, 2017

Weediquette is a documentary television series following Vice Media correspondent Krishna Andavolu as he chronicles the science, culture, and economics of the legalization of marijuana.

== History ==
Weediquette started in 2012 as a weekly column by Abdullah Saeed, then continued as a Vice.com web series in 2013. During a 2014 interview with José Mujica, Andavolu smoked a joint with President of Uruguay.

When the Viceland channel launched in February 2016, Weediquette transitioned to television, airing three seasons through 2017.

== Episodes ==
=== Web series (2013–14) ===
No.	Title	Original release date
1	"Introduction to Butane Hash Oil"	July 25, 2013
Abdullah Saeed goes to the 2013 Cannabis Cup in Denver, Colorado, to learn more about butane hash oil, aka BHO, butane honey oil, shatter, dabs, and wax.
2	"King of Cannabis"	August 8, 2013
Krishna joins Arjan and his crew of strain hunters in Colombia to look for three of the country's rarest types of weed, strains that have remained genetically pure for decades. They trudge up mountains and crisscross military checkpoints in the country's still-violent south, and then head north to the breathtaking Caribbean coast. As the dominoes of criminalization fall throughout the world, Arjan is positioned to be at the forefront of the legitimate international seed trade.
3	"Marijuana Minors"	December 11, 2013
Krishna goes to the small town of Pendleton, Oregon, where medical marijuana is legal, to visit Mykayla Comstock, an eight-year-old leukemia patient who takes massive amounts of weed to treat her illness. Her family, and many people we met along the way, believe not only in the palliative aspects of the drug, but also in marijuana's curative effect—that pot can literally shrink tumors.
4	"The Cannabis Republic of Uruguay"	April 26, 2014
Krishna examines cannabis in Uruguay, a country adjusting to a legally regulated marijuana market. During the visit Krishna meets President of Uruguay José Mujica to burn one down and discuss his goal of a chicken in every pot, a car in every garage, and six cannabis plants per household.
5	"The War on Kids"	July 16, 2014
The story of Jesse Snodgrass, a kid with Asperger syndrome who was entrapped by an undercover cop posing as a student at Jesse's high school.
6	"Stoned Moms"	September 18, 2014
Krishna travels to Denver with Jessica Roake, a mother of two from the suburbs of Washington, DC, for a mom-friendly cannabis tour. She gets blazed beyond belief in the name of market research.

=== Season 1 (2016) ===
No.	Title	Original release date
1	"Stoned Kids"	February 29, 2016
Many families whose children have cancer are using medical marijuana in their cancer therapy.
2	"Stoned Vets"	March 8, 2016
Veterans with PTSD often use marijuana as medicine even though it is not legal at the federal level.
3	"The War on Weed"	March 15, 2016
Krishna looks into the imprisonment of Bernard Noble, whose two joints led to 13 years in prison in Louisiana.
4	"Marijuana Migrants"	March 22, 2016
Krishna is meeting with families who've relocated to Colorado to seek marijuana as a medicine, as well as entrepreneurs trying to take advantage of the financial growth.
5	"The Emerald Triangle"	March 29, 2016
Krishna meets small budget growers in California whose farms are threatened by big corporations in the world's largest cannabis-producing region.
6	"Cannabis in Congo"	April 5, 2016
Krishna travels to the Democratic Republic of Congo to meet the Mbuti pygmies, where female dealers and farmers in rebel territories grow and sell marijuana.
7	"Mary Janes"	April 12, 2016
Krishna meets women working and running the marijuana trade.
8	"Half Baked"	April 19, 2016
Krishna heads to the District of Columbia and Amsterdam to see if partial marijuana legalization can work.

=== Season 2 (2016) ===
The series airs on Viceland, Wednesday nights at 10pm ET / 9pm CT.

No.	Title	Original release date
1	"Stoned Parents"	August 31, 2016
Many parents who use weed fear having their kids removed by Child Protective Services. Krishna travels to Kansas to see what it's like to be a stoned parent in a prohibition state.
2	"Gridiron Ganja"	September 7, 2016
While many NFL players treat the pain from the game with weed, some believe it may also protect against deadly brain injury, yet the league is vehemently against its use.
3	"Pot Powwow"	September 14, 2016
So far every Native American tribe to grow marijuana has been shut down by police. Now the Paiute Tribe of Las Vegas is looking to weed to save their tribe from extinction.
4	"Prohibition UK"	September 21, 2016
In Prohibition UK Krishna follows underground medical pot patients and providers as they dodge the law to deliver back alley healthcare, in a country that considers them criminals.
5	"Going Legit"	September 28, 2016
Krishna investigates why the original black market dealers and growers of Atlanta and Oakland haven't broken through into today’s legitimate weed world.
6	"Reefer Rehab"	October 5, 2016
Krishna visits an unaccredited detox facility in the backwoods of Maine, where former addicts are trying to get current addicts clean by smoking and eating massive amounts of weed.
7	"Search and Seizure"	October 12, 2016
Even though medical pot is legal in Michigan, weed arrests are up and cops raid mom and pop caregivers on minor technicalities in order to seize and sell their most valuable stuff.
8	"Christianity and Cannabis"	October 26, 2016
Krishna investigates if Christianity and cannabis culture can coexist.

=== Season 3 (2017) ===
The series airs on Viceland.

No.	Title	Original release date
1	"Deported for Dope"	April 19, 2017
2	"Herb for Autism"	April 26, 2017
3	"Pot Pipeline"	May 3, 2017
4	"Stoned Driving"	May 10, 2017
5	"Chronic Trauma"	May 17, 2017
6	"High Risk Pregnancies"	October 17, 2017
7	"Dank New World"	October 24, 2017
8	"Possessed by Pot"	October 31, 2017
9	"Colombian Gold"	November 7, 2017
10	"Between Life and Dope"	November 14, 2017

== See also ==
- Spike Jonze, Creative Director of Vice Media
