= Thomas Morton (journalist) =

American journalist

- Born: March 23, 1983 (age 43)
- Occupation: Journalist
- Known for: Contributing editor at Vice Magazine, documentary host

Thomas Morton (born March 23, 1983) is an American journalist, writer, documentary filmmaker, and television host. He is best known for his work as a correspondent and producer for the HBO documentary series Vice and as the creator and host of the Viceland documentary series Balls Deep. Morton began his career at Vice in 2004, contributing to its print journalism and early online documentary productions for VBS.tv. He remained with the company for approximately 15 years.

== Early life and education ==
Morton grew up in East Cobb, near Marietta, in the Atlanta metropolitan area of Georgia. He graduated from Walton High School at age 18 before enrolling at New York University in 2001, where he majored in English. He graduated from NYU before beginning an internship at Vice in 2004.

== Career ==
=== Vice magazine and VBS.tv (2004–2012) ===
Morton joined Vice in 2004, before the company's expansion into online video production around 2006 and 2007. During his tenure at Vice, Morton reported on religious groups, competitive eating, and various cultural communities. Among Morton's early assignments for Vice was a feature examining several religious movements, including Adidam, Scientology, the Unification Church, and Aleph, the successor organization to Aum Shinrikyo. Morton's early reporting for Vice included coverage of the Gathering of the Juggalos. Morton's early responsibilities at Vice included editorial assistance and writing short music reviews.

As Vice expanded into online video production, Morton transitioned from magazine writing to on-camera reporting. He recalled that production for VBS.tv began around 2006, ahead of the platform's 2007 launch. Morton then began appearing as an on-air correspondent in numerous documentaries and video series, covering environmental catastrophes in the Pacific Ocean, the Louisiana Gulf coast, and the Brazilian Amazon. In 2008, Morton interviewed Atlanta rapper Young Jeezy for VBS.tv.

Morton collaborated with Bernardo Loyola and Felipe Milanez on Toxic Amazon, a documentary examining the murders of Brazilian environmental activists José Cláudio Ribeiro da Silva and his wife, Maria do Espírito Santo, and conflicts over land use in the Amazon rainforest.

=== HBO Vice and Viceland (2013–2018) ===
In 2013, Morton began working as a producer and correspondent for HBO's documentary news series Vice. Morton reported on North Korean defectors traveling through Thailand as part of HBO's Vice documentary series.

In 2014, Morton reported from Kurdish-controlled areas of Syria for the second season of HBO's Vice, examining the region's emerging autonomous institutions during the Syrian civil war. Morton's reporting for Vice also included a visit to a former Soviet nuclear testing site in Kazakhstan, where he documented a crater lake created by a nuclear explosion. In a 2014 interview with Nylon, Morton discussed the risks associated with reporting in conflict zones and other hazardous environments, emphasizing the importance of balancing personal safety against the opportunity to document unfamiliar places and events.

Morton hosted Noisey's music documentary series Noisey Chiraq (2014), examining Chicago's drill music scene, and Noisey Atlanta (2015), exploring Atlanta's trap music culture.

In early 2016, Vice began broadcasting a new television channel, VICELAND. Thomas Morton hosted a long-form, pop anthropology docuseries called Balls Deep, which features in-depth investigative pieces focused on different American subcultures in each episode. Balls Deep developed from earlier documentary work produced for Vice's online video platform VBS.tv. In a 2017 interview, Morton recalled working on those earlier productions with cinematographer Matthew Nauser, with whom he had collaborated since approximately 2006. Morton conceived Balls Deep as a documentary series focused on American subcultures, following several years of international reporting. He described Balls Deep as a deliberately small-scale documentary production, generally filmed with a single camera operator, sound recordist, and field producer. The approach contrasted with the larger crews used for HBO's Vice.

Morton also worked on a documentary project involving Michelle Obama's Joining Forces initiative. In a 2017 podcast interview, he described seeking to expand the project's focus from veteran homelessness to include a behind-the-scenes examination of the First Lady's office in the White House's East Wing.

In February 2019, Morton appeared on the Longform Podcast to discuss his portrayal in Jill Abramson's book Merchants of Truth. He disputed aspects of the book's account of his career and expressed surprise at the extent to which it focused on his personal experiences at Vice.

=== Independent work (2019–present) ===
Morton left Vice following a layoff in early 2019, after approximately 15 years with the company. Following his departure from Vice in 2019, Morton continued writing independently. In an October 2020 interview, he discussed the difficulties facing freelance journalism during the COVID-19 pandemic. In a 2020 interview with Jesse Dekel, Morton expressed reservations about the professional designation "journalist", describing himself instead as a writer.

In 2024, Morton hosted the documentary It's Not Funny Anymore: Vice to Proud Boys, produced for the Canadian Broadcasting Corporation, examining his former Vice colleague and co-founder Gavin McInnes. Morton explained that the project was originally conceived as a documentary about the history of Vice during the 1990s and 2000s before shifting its focus to McInnes.

In an August 2026 guest essay for The New York Times, Morton described himself as a middle-aged man working the door at a bar in Chicago.
