= Dark Side of Reality TV =

American television documentary series

Dark Side of Reality TV is a TV documentary series exploring the darker aspects of reality television. It premiered on September 3, 2024.

== Episodes ==
No.	Title	Original release date
1	"The Swan"	September 3, 2024
FOX's The Swan promises women to be changed inspired by the fairy tale of The Ugly Duckling. The contestants are lured under the premise of "a free makeover", but what they don't know is that it will have both physical and mental consequences for them.
2	"Kid Nation"	September 17, 2024
The CBS reality Kid Nation pushes the boundaries of reality TV when its young cast, 40 children aged 8 to 15, participate in a six-week shooting in New Mexico. The Lord of the Flies-esque series had viewers, parents and New Mexico authorities worried about the legality of the show.
3	"Joe Millionaire"	September 24, 2024
Contestants on the FOX reality Joe Millionaire reveal the grueling nature of the producers trying to keep its biggest secret: The "millionaire" is a working-class regular man.
4	"The Surreal Life"	October 1, 2024
Reality series The Surreal Life blends the 24/7 open camera nature of The Real World and Big Brother with the celebrity culture of The Osbournes. In the quest of ratings, producers push the envelope as much as they want as the contestants fit roles made for them.
5	"Hell's Kitchen"	October 8, 2024
British chef Gordon Ramsay's two UK TV shows Boiling Point and Hell's Kitchen were hugely successful and when the latter is adapted into a US version it propels Ramsay into a global celebrity chef. Contestants learn about Ramsay's angry and profane ways of leading the kitchen, leaving mental scars to some of them, while his over-the-top persona is questioned by food and TV critics.
6	"Extreme Makeover: Home Edition"	October 15, 2024
Starting as a spin-off of Extreme Makeover, the reality Extreme Makeover: Home Edition showed the construction of new houses for families in need. A ratings hit, two of the families reveal the behind the scenes work of the show. With a housing crisis looming, some of them cannot keep up with their dream houses and their increased bills.
7	"Survivor - Season One"	October 22, 2024
The debut season of Survivor revolutionizes TV and the concept of reality shows as a whole. Its "castaways" recall the harsh conditions of the island, how producers portrayed them and the price of fame. Meanwhile, series creator Mark Burnett and season one winner Richard Hatch face legal challenges.
8	"The Real Housewives"	October 29, 2024
Reality series The Real Housewives starts as a down-to-earth, slice of life reality about upper class women, but as the series progresses and becomes a franchise, TV network Bravo and host/producer Andy Cohen twist the show into a modern day soap opera.
9	"Toddlers and Tiaras"	November 12, 2024
TLC's Toddlers & Tiaras showcases the inner workings of child beauty pageants and becomes a staple of the channel. Critics and former contestants retrospectively criticize the controversial nature of the show and TLC's inaction to address them.
10	"America's Next Top Model"	November 19, 2024
Supermodel Tyra Banks creates America's Next Top Model, heavily taking elements from other realites from the same era, including physical challenges, harsh judges and a co-living space full of cameras. Model hopefuls take the toll of the competition and the controversial results of the 17th All-Stars cycle end up tarnishing the legacy of the show.

== Interviewed for the series ==
- Janice Dickinson (America's Next Top Model and The Surreal Life)
- Dave Coulier (The Surreal Life)
- Omarosa Manigault Newman (The Surreal Life)
- Richard Hatch (Survivor)
- Daniel Kyri (Kid Nation)
- Vicki Gunvalson (The Real Housewives)
- Ivy Knight
- Laurie Woolever
- Adam Reiner

== See also ==
- Dark Side of the 90s – features episodes of the reality series COPS and The Real World
- Dark Side of the 2000s – features episodes of the reality series The Bachelor and Jon and Kate Plus 8
- Peak TV
- Social effects of television
- List of television shows notable for negative reception
