= Balls Deep (TV series) =

- Genre: Documentary
- Starring: Thomas Morton
- Countries of origin: Canada, United States
- Original language: English
- No. of seasons: 2 (Plus 6 Webisodes)
- No. of episodes: 22 (Including Webisodes)

Original release
- Network: Viceland
- Release: March 25, 2007 – December 29, 2016

Balls Deep is a documentary series airing on Viceland that follows host Thomas Morton, a journalist and contributing editor for Vice magazine.

The series explored its beginnings by airing only three webisodes in 2007 on VBS.tv, an online television network owned by Vice Media, which was later absorbed into Vice.com. Vice Media subsequently aired three more webisodes over the course of the next four years. Even though only seven webisodes were aired over five years via VBS.tv, Vice Media and Thomas Morton continued to be involved in immersive journalism with documentaries such as Garbage Island (the Great Pacific Garbage Patch), the MTV series The Vice Guide to Everything, Toxic Amazon, and the Emmy Award Winning HBO series Vice airing Friday nights at 11pm ET / 10pm CT.

According to Morton, "There are 7 billion lives happening right now. Including my own. Once I personally experience how the rest of the planet lives on a daily basis, I should finally understand humanity and myself."

== Episodes ==
=== Webisodes (2007–2012) ===
The webisodes were originally aired on VBS.tv, an online television network later absorbed into VICE.com.

No. overall	No. in season	Title	Original release date
1	1	"Leathermen"	March 25, 2007
2	2	"Sewers of Bogota"	April 24, 2007
3	3	"Ultimate Fighting"	November 21, 2007
4	4	"The Sakawa Boys"	April 6, 2011
5	5	"Takanakuy"	March 12, 2012
6	6	"Female Fighters of Kurdistan"	July 23, 2012

=== Season 1 (2016) ===
The season started airing on Viceland on February 29, 2016.

No. overall	No. in season	Title	Original release date
7	1	"Tent Preachin"	February 29, 2016
8	2	"Tugs"	March 2, 2016
9	3	"Ramadan"	March 9, 2016
10	4	"Bears"	March 16, 2016
11	5	"Alaska Natives"	March 23, 2016
12	6	"Orgasmic Meditators"	March 30, 2016
13	7	"Last Week of High School"	April 6, 2016

=== Season 2 (2016) ===
The season started airing on Viceland on October 27, 2016.

No. overall	No. in season	Title	Original release date
14	1	"Seniors"	October 27, 2016
15	2	"Trump Campaigners"	November 3, 2016
16	3	"Ranchers"	November 10, 2016
17	4	"T-Girls"	November 17, 2016
18	5	"Frosh"	December 1, 2016
19	6	"Dead"	December 7, 2016
20	7	"Valley Goths"	December 15, 2016
21	8	"Zen and the Art of Living"	December 22, 2016
22	9	"Mr. Banks Goes to Washington (W/Michelle Obama)"	December 29, 2016
