= Viceland =

Multinational television channel brand

Viceland (stylized in all caps) was a brand used for television channels owned and programmed by Vice Media. The brand launched on February 29, 2016, with two cable channels in North America. The American version, now known as Vice TV (rebranded from A&E sibling H2), is a joint venture majority-owned by A+E Global Media (which itself owned a stake in Vice Media, alongside a separate ownership stake by A+E's co-owner, the Walt Disney Company). A Canadian version (rebranded from a domestic version of another A&E sibling, Bio) operated as a Category A-licensed specialty channel majority-owned by Rogers Media until its discontinuation on March 31, 2018.

Operating under the creative direction of film director Spike Jonze, Viceland was a lifestyle-oriented channel that primarily aired documentary and reality series aimed towards millennials, including new original series, and adaptations and reruns of existing Vice web series. Some of the network's launch programs were hosted by existing Vice personalities such as Action Bronson and Thomas Morton, as well as notable figures such as Eddie Huang, Elliot Page, and Lance Bangs.

== Overview ==
=== Precursors ===
Vice's first foray into television was VBS.tv, an online video joint venture with Viacom's MTV Networks division (specifically, MTV and Logo TV). As part of the venture, MTV Networks had international television distribution rights for the content produced for VBS.tv, resulting in the creation of television specials that compiled content from the service (in the U.S., these aired on MTV2). Vice later produced a series for MTV, The Vice Guide to Everything. In 2013, Vice premiered a self-titled newsmagazine series for HBO. The following year, HBO's parent company Time Warner expressed interest in acquiring a stake in Vice, and proposed the possibility of Vice taking over its struggling cable news channel HLN, and revamping it as a millennial-focused service drawing from its own content. However, the deal fell through due to concerns regarding editorial control.

On August 29, 2014, A&E Networks—a joint venture of Hearst Corporation and The Walt Disney Company—acquired a 10% minority stake in Vice Media for $250 million. On October 30, 2014, Vice announced a CDN$100 million joint venture with Canadian media conglomerate Rogers Communications, to build a studio in Toronto's Liberty Village neighborhood for producing original content. Rogers holds the minority 30% stake of the Vice Canada Studio in Toronto. Rogers also announced an intent to launch Vice-branded television and digital properties in Canada in 2015. Rogers CEO Guy Laurence described the proposed studio as "a powerhouse for Canadian digital content focused on 18- to 34-year-olds" which would be "exciting" and "provocative". In 2015, Rogers-owned television network City introduced Vice on City—an anthology series featuring short-form content produced by Vice's Canadian outlets and reporters. The Vice company had previously moved from Montreal to New York City due to difficulties in reaching a sufficient scale in Canada at the time. The company believed that Rogers' investment in Vice helped to better achieve these goals.

=== Programming ===
Viceland's programming consists primarily of lifestyle-oriented documentaries and reality series aimed towards millennials, directed in Vice's trademark style of "character-driven documentaries". Creative director Spike Jonze stated that his goal for Viceland was to make its lineup have "a reason to exist and a strong point of view", rather than be just a "collection of shows". Jonze explained that Viceland would continue to reflect Vice's core mission of "trying to understand the world we live in by producing pieces about things we're curious about or confused about or that we think are funny. And if it doesn't have a strong point of view, then it shouldn't be on this channel." Vice co-founder and CEO Shane Smith stated that the channel's main goal was "trying not to be shitty". Viceland originally focused primarily on lifestyle content; in the U.S., Vice News content (including its series Vice News Tonight) would remain largely exclusive to Vice's existing joint venture with HBO. Jonze stated that unlike the HBO content, Viceland would be "far from objective [reporting]".

Vice Media plans to enter into similar partnerships in international markets to further expand Viceland. The Walt Disney Company, who co-owns A&E Networks with Hearst Corporation, made a second 10% investment of $200 million in Vice Media to support the production of new programming.

Thirty different programs were developed for Viceland, including original series and expanded versions of existing Vice's web series. Original programs announced for the initial slate included Thomas Morton's Balls Deep, Flophouse— a series where Lance Bangs follows the lives of up-and-coming comedians at underground stand-up events, F**k, That's Delicious— a television version of the food-oriented web series starring Action Bronson, Gaycation— a series in which Elliot Page explores the LGBT cultures of different regions, Huang's World— featuring Eddie Huang "exploring identity using food as an equalizer", King of the Road— a series following skaters on Thrasher Magazine's annual scavenger hunt, States of Undress— a series focusing on fashion weeks around the world, the music documentary series Noisey, Vice World of Sports, and Weediquette— which focuses on the mainstream cannabis culture and industry. Blocks of existing short-form content from Vice (Vice Lab) are also featured, along with other, acquired content— such as Friday-night airings of cult films accompanied by Vice Guide to Film documentaries on their directors. Ten of the thirty original programs planned were produced in Canada, including Cyberwar— which focuses on cyberterrorism, and Dead Set on Life— an expansion of Matty Matheson's food-oriented web series Keep It Canada.

== Versions ==
Prior to its North American launch, Vice ran newspaper ads for Viceland, containing only the network's name and a phone number that, when called, invited viewers to contribute answers to questions. Pre-launch programming for Viceland began on February 29, 2016, at 5:00 a.m. ET in Canada (with Bar Talk, a one-hour special hosted by Vice Canada's head of content Patrick McGuire), and on the same day at 6:00 a.m. ET in the United States, broadcasting a countdown clock to the official launch later in the evening, accompanied by footage of Vice executives answering the viewer-contributed calls as voice mail. The first program following the countdown was the series premiere of Noisey, following hip-hop musician Kendrick Lamar.

In June 2016, Shane Smith announced at the Cannes Lions Festival that Vice Media had reached deals with local broadcasters to expand into 44 countries with the launch of editorial properties and localized Viceland networks. These include the Special Broadcasting Service (Australia), Econet Media (sub-Saharan Africa), The Times Group (India), Moby Media Group (Middle East), Multi Channels Asia (Southeast Asia), Sky Network Television (New Zealand), V Media Group (Canada, French-language), Canal+ (France), Ziggo (Netherlands) and Telenet (Belgium).

Vice holds a 49% minority stake and control of international expansions, except in Australia; where the channel is wholly owned and operated by the SBS.

=== Current ===
==== United States ====
The American Viceland channel operated as a joint venture with A&E Networks, (itself a stake owner of Vice Media) and originally replaced H2.

A month after its initial launch, Viceland announced a second slate of shows, including Traveling the Stars: Action Bronson and Friends Watch 'Ancient Aliens'—a series in which Action Bronson watches episodes of Ancient Aliens with guests whilst smoking marijuana, Black Market— a series in which Michael K. Williams explores underground economies around the world, the U.S. premieres of Cyberwar and Dead Set on Life, Party Legends— a show about re-enactments of entertaining party stories, WOMAN— a series in which Gloria Steinam features the lives of different women around the world, and VICE Does America— which Abdullah Saeed and two Vice co-workers explore forgotten places of the world. In October 2016, Viceland launched a late-night talk show, Desus & Mero, hosted by Desus Nice and The Kid Mero. The program ran through June 2018, when it was cancelled after the duo signed with Showtime to host a rebooted version (which premiered in early-2019).

In 2019, Viceland began to pivot its U.S. operations to include a larger focus on news programming: on February 29, the network launched Vice Live—a two-hour "variety show" aired Monday–Thursday nights from Vice's Brooklyn headquarters, which featured coverage of the day's trends, reports from Vice's international bureaus, guest appearances, as well as other freeform content. The show was cancelled on April 15. That month, Viceland also premiered Dark Side of the Ring, a documentary series on controversial events in professional wrestling. The series would become Viceland's highest-rated premiere, and was renewed for a second season. After HBO ended its partnership with Vice News, Vice News Tonight was subsequently picked up by Viceland.

On December 2, 2019, Viceland was quietly renamed to Vice TV.

=== Former ===
==== Canada ====
A Canadian version launched concurrently with the U.S. version as a relaunch of The Biography Channel, with Rogers Media as a managing partner. Separately, plans were made with V Media Group to create a channel in French Canada. To comply with Canadian content regulations, it also produced some of its own programming (sourced primarily from a Toronto studio it co-founded with Rogers); Vice co-founder Suroosh Alvi stated the programs were being produced

Viceland would view its Canadian productions as being of global interest, as opposed to a regulatory obligation of little interest of non-Canadians; one-third of the network's first slate of original programming are Canadian productions from the new facility.

In November 2017, Canadian newspaper The Globe and Mail reported that Rogers intended to cease providing funding to Viceland in early 2018, citing inside reports of low viewership and unprofitability. Representatives of both companies declined to comment. On January 22, 2018, Rogers and Vice jointly announced a termination of their partnership, with the Viceland channel discontinued on March 31, 2018. Vice inherited complete ownership of the Toronto production studio and the original content produced for the channel as the Vice website will stream Viceland's programming in Canada. Plans for a French-language channel were also dropped; V Media Group will feature Vice content in French on its channels.

On August 16, 2018, Vice announced a new long-term output deal with Bell Media, with its programming being aired by Bell platforms such as Crave and Much.

==== United Kingdom and Ireland ====
On March 9, 2016, Vice Media announced that it would launch Viceland in the United Kingdom in September 2016 as part of a partnership with Sky, marking its first international launch. This includes carriage on its satellite and over-the-top Now TV services, access to Vice apps on Sky Q set-top boxes, and timed exclusivity for video-on-demand/Sky Go access. Sky will handle advertising sales for the channel which is available in Ireland.

Low ratings were reported of the British and Irish version, where some programs premiered to viewership so low that they failed to register ratings. A Sky representative defended the channel, noting the steady growth and accolades of the U.S. network.

On July 17, 2017, Viceland launched a block of late night anime in partnership with Anime Limited. Viceland changed its name to Vice on TV in 2018.

As of July 21, 2018, Vice on TV is now available on Virgin Media channel 219. A temporary duplicate launched on channel 191 on Virgin Media at midnight on July 22, 2018, a slot previously vacated by W HD prior to the UKTV channels' removals, until the network was restored on August 11, 2018. The channel was removed from Virgin Media on July 20, 2020.

The channel closed on May 1, 2021.

==== Netherlands and Belgium ====
Viceland started broadcasting in the Netherlands and Flanders on March 1, 2017, initially exclusively to the cable-operator Ziggo, owned by VodafoneZiggo. Viceland had concluded a deal with Liberty Global, 50% owner of VodafoneZiggo. On June 15, 2017, Viceland started with the local cable operator Caiway. Only on July 18, 2018, Viceland managed to obtain distribution with KPN, a national provider and competitor to Ziggo, resulting in nationwide availability. At the same time distribution started with T-Mobile Thuis, another national operator. Viceland Nederland produces a few Dutch productions and was in the beginning of its existence in the news for having a documentary with Geert Wilders.

In Belgium, Viceland Vlaanderen started with Telenet, the Flemish cableprovider majority owned by Liberty Global on March 1, 2017. Viceland Belgique, a French-speaking Belgian version of Viceland started on June 1, 2017, together with the launch of the Dutch version on the national IPTV provider Proximus. In October 2017 also VOO (operator for French speaking Belgium) and provider Orange started distributing Viceland giving Viceland national distribution in Belgium.

In the Netherlands and Flanders, the television channel was renamed to Vice TV on November 1, 2019.

Vice TV ceased existing in the Netherlands and Flanders on August 24, 2020.

==== Southeast Asia ====
A Viceland programming block was aired on Outdoor Channel in Malaysia from August 2016.

==== Australia ====
On November 15, 2016, Australian public broadcaster Special Broadcasting Service (SBS) re-launched its SBS 2 channel as SBS Viceland. The re-branded channel initially featured Viceland's programming and other newly commissioned content, alongside original news, entertainment, and sports programming carried over from its previous branding. On May 18, 2026, it was revealed that the channel will rebrand as SBS2 on August 21. SBS Viceland would outlive all other international Viceland-branded outlets during its near-decade run, and would be last of them to be discontinued.
