= VBS.tv =

Former online television network of Vice Media

Vice Broadcasting System
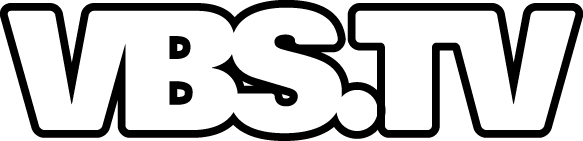
- Company type: Subsidiary
- Website type: Video hosting service
- Founded: March 2007
- Headquarters: New York City, United States
- Owner: Vice
- Key people: Spike Jonze (creative director); Suroosh Alvi (Vice co-founder); Shane Smith (Vice co-founder)
- Advertising: Vice Media
- Current status: Merged

VBS.tv was an online television network owned by Vice Media, and later absorbed into VICE.com. The network produced original, short-form, documentary-style video content under the auspice of VICE Films. Subject matter included humanitarian issues, music, insider travel guides, and news. The creative director of the network was Spike Jonze.

== History ==
=== Formation ===
VBS began as a deal between Viacom-owned MTV Networks and Logo Group. In March 2007, the network was formed; MTV funded the formation of the network, and Vice magazine would supply the content. MTV has the right to distribute VBS content across its worldwide network of channels. According to Vice co-founder Suroosh Alvi, "traditional journalism always aspires to objectivity, and since day one with the magazine we never believed in that...Our ethos is subjectivity with real substantiation. I don't think you see that on CNN."

=== Circulation ===
VBS videos are available via the network's website, as well as being broadcast on MTV Latin America and MTV2. VBS is currently featured as a weekly show on MTV2. VBS.tv content has appeared on CNN as part of their CNN presents line-up, with CNN stating that "... We believe this unique reporting approach is worthy of sharing with our CNN.com readers." Much of it is now available at VICE.com.

=== Content ===
The network's videos feature reporting on popular culture, travel, extreme sports, and music. The site has also produced special-interest and current affairs-based shows such as an interview with Hezbollah's self-proclaimed mayor of Beirut and a show that explored allegations of environmental abuse. It has also approached drug issues, producing a documentary about the criminal use of the drug scopolamine in Colombia, a report on cocaine smuggling submarines and a documentary on hallucinogenic frogs in the Amazon rainforest. Other coverage includes a series of short documentaries about Darfur, Hurricane Katrina, Liberia, North Korea and suicide in Japan's Aokigahara Forest. The network also produced Heavy Metal in Baghdad, a feature-length documentary film about Acrassicauda. The director of content of the network was Santiago Stelley.

== Filmography ==
Title	Format	Producer	Channel	Year
Vice Guide to Travel	Documentary film series	VBS.tv	VBS.tv, MTV2	2006
Colombian Devil's Breath	Documentary film	VBS.tv	VBS.tv	2007
Balls Deep: Sewers of Bogota	Documentary film	VBS.tv	VBS.tv	2007
Asses of the Caribbean	Documentary film	VBS.tv	VBS.tv	2007
True Norwegian Black Metal	Documentary film series	VBS.tv	VBS.tv	2007
Heavy Metal in Baghdad	Rockumentary	VBS.tv	VBS.tv, film festivals	2007
Alarma!	Documentary feature	VBS.tv	VBS.tv, film festivals	2008
The Alli Show	Documentary television series	VBS.tv	MTV2	2009
VBS Meets Watermelon Woman	Documentary film	VBS.tv	VBS.tv	2009
White Lightnin'	Dramatic feature	VICE Films	Film festivals	2009
Aokigahara Suicide Forest	Documentary film	VBS.tv	VBS.tv	2009
Hamilton's Pharmacopeia: Sapo Diaries	Documentary film	VBS.tv	VBS.tv	2009
The Vice Guide to Everything	Television series	VBS.tv	MTV2	2010
Interview with a Cannibal	Documentary film	VBS.tv	VBS.tv	2010
Rule Britannia	Documentary film series	VBS.tv	VBS.tv	2010
The Ride	Documentary feature	VICE Films	Film festivals	2010
Heimo's Arctic Refuge	Documentary film	VBS.tv	VBS.tv	2010
The Fourth Dimension	Three short films	VICE Films	Film festivals	2012
Vice	Documentary television	HBO	HBO	2013
Lil Bub & Friendz	Documentary feature	VICE Films	Film festivals	2013
Reincarnated	Documentary feature	VICE Films	Film festivals	2013
