= The Vice Guide to Travel =

2006 documentary show by Vice Media

- Directed by: Eddy Moretti, Shane Smith
- Starring: Shane Smith, Trace Crutchfield, David Cross, Derrick Beckles, Gavin McInnes, David Choe, Johnny Knoxville
- Country of origin: Canada
- No. of episodes: 15

Production
- Running time: Variable

Original release
- Network: VBS.tv
- Release: 2006 – 2012

The Vice Guide to Travel is a travel show-style documentary show released in 2006 by Vice Media, as part of the VBS.tv online television division of Vice. The show follows Vice employees as they travel to dangerous, weird, and offbeat locations throughout the globe.

== History ==
On October 3, 2006, VICE released the DVD The Vice Guide to Travel, which was funded by MTV and inspired by the long-running series of "Vice Guides" in the magazine. VICE reporters and camera teams visited locations such as the slums of Rio de Janeiro, DR Congo, and Paraguay. Spike Jonze helped edit the pieces.

Videos such as the Vice Guide to Travel (2006) were made accessible for free on VBS.tv, and the docu-series The Vice Guide to Liberia by Andy Capper won a Webby Award, helping foster a future partnership with CNN. The episodes are currently available at VICE.com, where VBS.tv was later merged.

Hosts and recurring characters have included Shane Smith, Trace Crutchfield, actor David Cross, Derrick Beckles, editor Gavin McInnes, artist David Choe, and Johnny Knoxville of Jackass.

== Episodes ==
The following are the episodes of The Vice Guide to Travel.

1. The Gun Markets of Pakistan
2. Bulgarian Dirty Bombs
3. The Radioactive Beasts of Chernobyl
4. PLO Boy Scouts of Beirut
5. Gorillas in the Midst
6. The Slums of Rio
7. Prostitutes of God
8. Gypsies of Sophia
9. Wodka Wars
10. From Poland With Love
11. Holy Thugs of Venezuela
12. Jesus of Siberia
13. The Warias
14. Illegal Border Crossing Park
15. VICE Guide to Liberia
16. VICE Guide to North Korea
17. North Korean Labor Camps
18. VICE Guide to the Balkans
19. Takanakuy: Fist fighting in the Andes
20. VICE Guide to Karachi

== Soundtrack ==
Vice also released a soundtrack album to the series on CD.

1. Death From Above 1979 – "Black History Month (Josh Homme Remix)"
2. Panthers – "Walk of Shame"
3. Japanther – "The Gravey"
4. Averkiou – "I Don't Want to Go Out"
5. Black Lips – "Hippie, Hippie, Hoorah"
6. Panthers – "If You Were Young Once, Rage"
7. 5ive – "Soma"
8. Damien Done – "Cat Song"
9. Tarentel – "We're the Only Ghosts Here"
10. Jukeboxer – "Pilgrims"

== See also ==
- Rule Britannia (2009)
- Vice (TV series) (2013)
