= David Choe =

American painter (born 1976)

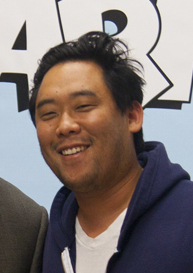
- Choe in 2010
- Born: April 22, 1976 (age 50); Los Angeles, California, U.S.
- Education: California College of the Arts
- Occupation: Painter
- Known for: Painting, murals, graphic novels
- Awards: Xeric Grant
- Website: www.davidchoe.com

David Choe (born April 22, 1976) is an American artist, actor, journalist, and podcast host from Los Angeles. Choe's work appears in a wide variety of urban culture and entertainment contexts. He has illustrated and written for magazines including Hustler, Ray Gun, and Vice. He has an ongoing relationship with the Asian pop culture website, store, and former magazine Giant Robot.

Choe's figurative paintings, which explore themes of desire, degradation, and exaltation, are characterized by a raw, frenetic method that he has termed "dirty style".

== Early life and education ==
Choe was born in Los Angeles, California. His parents are Korean immigrants and born-again Christians. He spent his childhood in Koreatown, Los Angeles. He has been spray-painting on the streets since he was in his teens. He briefly attended the California College of the Arts.

== Career ==
Cover of Slow Jams by Choe, after Henri de Toulouse-Lautrec's At the Moulin Rouge

In 1996, Choe self-published a graphic novel, Slow Jams. In 1999, he submitted Slow Jams for the Xeric Grant and was awarded $5,000 to self-publish a second, expanded edition of 1,000, which came out in 1999.

In 2005, internet entrepreneur Sean Parker, a longtime fan, asked him to paint graphic sexual murals in the interior of Facebook's first Silicon Valley office, and in 2007, Facebook CEO Mark Zuckerberg commissioned him to paint somewhat tamer murals for its next office. Although he thought the Facebook business model was "ridiculous and pointless", Choe chose to receive company stock in lieu of cash payment for his original murals. His shares were valued at approximately $200 million on the eve of Facebook's 2012 IPO.

After holding several solo shows in San Jose and San Francisco, Choe was offered a solo exhibit at the Santa Rosa Museum of Contemporary Art in 2005. He held his first New York solo exhibit, "Gardeners of Eden", in 2007 at Jonathan LeVine Gallery in Chelsea. In 2008, he had his first UK solo exhibition, "Murderous Heart", in Lazarides Gallery's London and Newcastle locations simultaneously.

In 2008, Choe and Harry Kim made an autobiographical documentary, Dirty Hands: The Art and Crimes of David Choe.

=== Vice ===
After being approached for his artwork by Gavin McInnes and Shane Smith, Choe was recruited to write and do artwork for Vice magazine.

Choe and Harry Kim starred in the Vice-produced web series Thumbs Up!, which ran for three seasons. The series documents Choe and Kim hitchhiking and freight-hopping from Los Angeles to Miami (season 1) and Tijuana to Alaska (season 2). In Season 3 they hitch across China from Beijing to Shenzhen and Macau. A fourth "season", in which Choe and Kim travel from San Francisco to New York, was released via short-form video clips on Snapchat and Instagram.

=== 2013–present ===
In 2013, Choe and adult film star Asa Akira began hosting DVDASA, an online lifestyle and entertainment podcast.

Also in 2013, Choe had a solo exhibition of his watercolors at the Museo Universario del Chopo, Mexico City.

After receiving extensive therapy and treatment, Choe reemerged in 2017 with a new body of work and an exhibition in Los Angeles that had themes of trauma, self-reflection, and hope for recovery.

In 2023, Choe starred as Isaac Cho in the Netflix drama-comedy miniseries Beef. He also painted the title cards for episodes 2 through 10.

== Charitable works ==
Since 2008, Choe has dedicated many of his works to charity and collaborated with foundations to support their causes, including fundraising for Haiti with Yle Haiti, a foundation founded by Wyclef Jean; painting with the children of The LIDÈ Haiti Foundation; and painting with children of South Central LA at APCH.

== Controversy ==
In March 2014, Choe said on DVDASA that he had engaged in "rapey behavior" with a masseuse. He defended his comment by saying that the podcast is essentially fictional. After he was commissioned to paint the Bowery Mural Wall in 2017, other artists protested, including street artist Swoon, who issued a statement against his inclusion in the mural project. Artist Jasmine Wahi, co-organized a performance in front of the mural, saying, "Our aim is to provoke widespread rejection of the continued normalization of rape culture by bringing visibility to the topic." The mural was quickly defaced by graffiti. Choe responded by again publicly denying any history of sexual assault or rape and apologizing for his original comments. The comments resurfaced in April 2023 after the success of the Netflix drama-comedy miniseries Beef.

== Legal issue ==
In the early 2000s, Choe was reportedly arrested in Japan, where he was taking part in an art show, after an altercation with a police officer. Various sources cite the year as 2003 or 2005 and say he spent two or three months in prison.

== Filmography ==
Film

Year	Title	Role	Notes
2007	We Are the Strange	Rain	
2008	Dirty Hands: The Art and Crimes of David Choe	Himself	Documentary

Television

Year	Title	Role	Notes
2013	Anthony Bourdain: Parts Unknown	Himself	Episode: "Koreatown, Los Angeles"
2008	Dirty Hands: The Art and Crimes of David Choe	Himself	
2014	Vice	Himself	3 episodes
2018	Ugly Delicious	Himself	Episode: "Barbecue"
2019	Better Things	Postmates Guy	Episode: "Easter"
2020	The Mandalorian	Ringside Spectator	Episode: "Chapter 9: The Marshal"
2021	The Choe Show	Himself	Also creator
2023	Beef	Isaac Cho	

Short film

Year	Title	Role	Notes
2025	Old Boyz	Himself	Short film with Bobby Lee

Web series

Year	Title	Role	Notes
2007–2010	Thumbs Up!	Himself	VBS.tv
2011	The Last Dinosaur of the Congo with David Choe	Himself	VBS.tv
2013	DVDASA	Himself	Podcast; also creator

Music video appearances

Year	Title	Role	Notes
2025	Far East Movement — "Rocketeer"	Himself	Cameo

== Bibliography ==
Title	Publisher	Year	ISBN	Ref.
Slow Jams	Self-published	1999		
Bruised Fruit, the Art of David Choe	Drips Inc.	2002		
Cursiv	Giant Robot	2003		
David Choe	Chronicle Books	2010	ISBN 0-8118-6953-9	
