= Lil Bub =

Internet celebrity cat (2011–2019)

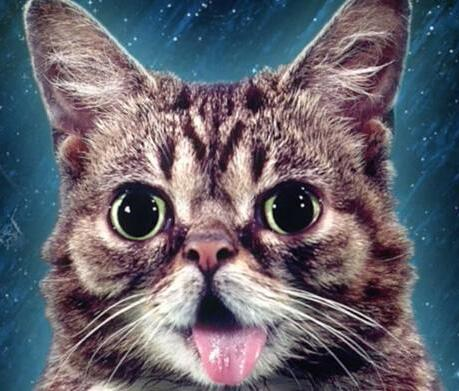
- Lil Bub in 2013
- Species: Felis catus
- Sex: Female
- Born: June 21, 2011; Bloomington, Indiana, U.S.
- Died: December 1, 2019 (aged 8); Bloomington, Indiana, U.S.
- Owner: Mike Bridavsky
- Weight: 3.9 lb (1.8 kg)

Lil Bub, officially Lil BUB (June 21, 2011 – December 1, 2019), was an American celebrity cat known for her unique physical appearance. Her photos were first posted to Tumblr in November 2011, before taking off after being featured on the social news website Reddit. "Lil Bub" on Facebook has over three million likes. Lil Bub starred in Lil Bub & Friendz, a documentary that premiered at the Tribeca Film Festival on April 18, 2013, and won the Tribeca Online Festival Best Feature Film.

== Background ==
Lil Bub was the runt of her litter born to a feral mother. She was born with several genetic mutations, had to be bottle-fed, and had difficulty being adopted. Lil Bub had an extreme form of feline dwarfism that caused her limbs and lower jaw to be quite small in comparison to the rest of her body. The shortened lower jaw meant that, among other things, she could not retain her tongue within her mouth. She also had extra toes. Her owner, Mike Bridavsky, adopted her when his friends asked him to give her a home. When Bridavsky first picked her up, he said "Hey, Bub!"

Lil Bub suffered from osteopetrosis for which she received medication. In late 2012, during the filming of Lil Bub & Friendz, she had a serious health episode and was diagnosed with osteopetrosis by a specialist in Indianapolis. Lil Bub's short legs and osteopetrosis restricted her movement but she was termed "a fantastic waddler." Vibrations from travel also break down the osteoclasts.

A group of individuals launched a campaign on the website Experiment.com to sequence Lil Bub's genome. The purpose of this project was to better understand Lil Bub's unique appearance (for example, her extra digits). The campaign reached its funding goal on May 25, 2015. The scientists found Lil Bub had a mutation in gene RANK/TNFRSF11A which has also been found in one mouse and fifteen humans. Their research on Lil Bub is published at bioRxiv.

Bridavsky sold a variety of merchandise under the LIL BUB moniker and donated much of the profits to animal rescue groups. Some of the money also helped Bridavsky pay off six months of back rent on his recording studio. Bridavsky has a policy to not "approach anybody for anything" and chose to not sign with talent agent Ben Lashes, whose clients have included Grumpy Cat. Lil Bub’s Lil Book: The Extraordinary Life of the Most Amazing Cat on the Planet was released September 3, 2013.

In May 2021, Bridavsky released a visual history coffee table book, Lil BUB: The Earth Years, with author Aaron Tanner.

== Meet and greets ==
Bridavsky arranged "meet and greets" for both him and Lil Bub at animal shelters around the US. The shelters received donations and a cut of merchandise sales. Lil Bub met Grumpy Cat at the second annual Internet Cat Video Film Festival. Lil Bub had a book signing for her new book at Strand Books on September 5. A screening of Lil Bub & Friendz at Metro Chicago raised $1,800 for Tree House Humane Society.

== Media appearances ==
Lil Bub appeared on Good Morning America in August 2012. She did a photoshoot with Bullett Magazine in October 2012. In October 2012 Lil Bub and Mike Brivadsky were interviewed by a group of kids on WTIU's local children's program The Friday Zone, airing on Indiana's PBS stations. In the "A Moment with Lil Bub" series created for The Friday Zone, Lil Bub speaks for the first and only time in any media. She was also featured in Bloom Magazine in the December 2012/January 2013 edition. Lil Bub posed for a PETA campaign that encouraged people to spay and neuter their pets in 2013.

She appeared on Today and The View in April 2013. Lil Bub appeared in the YouTube Big Live Comedy Show with Jack McBrayer and the cast of Workaholics. She also appeared on an episode of Meme'd on The Pet Collective. In September 2014, Lil Bub was interviewed by David Yow of The Jesus Lizard for The A.V. Club.

Lil Bub makes an appearance in the film Nine Lives (2016) as the cat form of the film's main antagonist Ian Cox (Mark Consuelos) after he is hit by a car and his soul goes inside the cat's body. Her final media appearance was in the 2018 movie I'll Be Next Door for Christmas.

An album was released under Lil Bub's name, with Bridavsky as producer, in 2015. The album, Science & Magic, features liner notes by Andrew W.K. and includes recordings of Lil Bub's vocalizations interpolated into instrumental electronic music tracks.

Lil Bub's life story was featured for 30 minutes during the three hour "Animal Special" episode of the Japanese TV show Experience a Miracle – Unbelievable. In this dramatization the role of Mike Bridavsky was played by New Zealand actor Gregory Snelgar.

=== Lil Bub & Friendz ===
Lil Bub stars in Lil Bub & Friendz, a documentary directed by Andy Capper and Juliette Eisner and premiered at the Tribeca Film Festival on April 18, 2013. The film also stars Keyboard Cat, Nyan Cat and Grumpy Cat. Capper and Eisner decided to make a full-length film after meeting Lil Bub and seeing the turnout of 10,000 people at the 2012 Internet Cat Video Film Festival in Minneapolis. Lil Bub & Friendz won the Tribeca Online Festival Best Feature Film.

Lil Bub, Bridavsky, Capper and Eisner attended the Tribeca Drive-In outdoor screening at the World Financial Center Plaza on April 20. Lil Bub did a petting and photo session. Festival co-head Robert De Niro met Lil Bub at the Director's Brunch on April 23 after co-head Jane Rosenthal quipped to The Hollywood Reporter "I keep saying Little Bub needs to meet Big Bob."

On Lil Bub's second birthday, June 21, 2013, it was announced that she would star in Lil BUB's Big SHOW web series with Revision3. Bridavsky selected Rev3 for its connections to Discovery Communications and Animal Planet. Bridavsky had full writing and creative control. The talk show format was made possible by having a subtitled Lil Bub edited with footage of her guests recorded separately. Her first guest was Whoopi Goldberg who met her on The View in April 2013. The episode ended with Lil Bub introducing the audience to Tabby's Place, a cat sanctuary for disadvantaged felines. The episode aired September 3, 2013.

== Death ==
Lil Bub died in her sleep on December 1, 2019. According to Bridavsky, Lil Bub had been fighting an aggressive bone infection at the time of her death.

== See also ==
- List of individual cats
