= Rule Britannia (TV series) =

- Genre: Documentary
- Created by: Vice Films
- Country of origin: United Kingdom

Production
- Production location: United Kingdom
- Production company: Vice Media

Original release
- Network: VBS.tv
- Release: 6 June 2009

Rule Britannia is a series of online documentary episodes produced by Vice Films. The series debuted on VBS.tv in 2010. Most episodes are between 15 and 30 minutes.

Swansea was featured in the 2011 episode "Swansea Love Story", which covers a heroin epidemic in the UK. It was directed by Andy Capper and was a Webby Award Official Honoree.

== Episodes ==
#	Release date	Title	Crew	Synopsis
1	2009 Jun 6	"The Deer Hunter"		In the first episode, Vice UK goes to the Scottish Highlands to kill one of the world's most beautiful animals.
2	2009 Jul 12	"Blackpool: Las Vegas of the North"	Andy Capper	A week in North England's decaying fantasy island, Blackpool.
3	2010 Feb 9	"Swansea Love Story"	Andy Capper with Leo Leigh	In 2009, Swansea drug agencies reported a 180 percent rise in heroin use. VICE follows a young homeless couple named Amy and Cornelius caught in the middle of two of South Wales's epidemics.
4	2010 Aug 24	"Afghanistan in the U.K."	Andy Capper with Jason Mojica	VICE travel to STANTA to meet the 2 PARA, one of the British army's most elite and, legendarily, aggressive units.
5	2011 Jan 28	"Teenage Riot"	Andy Capper, hosted by Alex Miller	Riots in London, December 2010. As MPs voted on a rise in tuition fees, thousands of students took over Parliament Square, clashing with police and setting fires.
6	2011 Apr 20	"Royal Wedding"	Hosted by Alex Miller	Tells the story of the peripheral figures obsessed with Prince William and Kate Middleton's upcoming marriage.
7	2011 Apr 25	"Beautiful Liverpool"	Andy Capper with Leo Leigh	VBS travels to Liverpool, Europe's capital of beauty. There are more gyms and tanning salons per head here than anywhere else in the UK.
8	2011 Sep 28	"Fraud"	Andy Capper with William Fairman	Meet the fraudsters who are making a fortune from the fastest growing crime on Earth.
9	2011 Nov 28	"Rose Boy and Friends"	Andy Capper with Jamie Lee Curtis Taete and Billie JD Porter	VBS tag along with celebrity superfans like Harvii, who claims he has had his photo taken with over 1,000 celebrities
10	2012 Jul 25	"The VICE Guide to the Olympics"	Pegah Farahmand	VBS.tv met residents of the Carpenter's Estate, who have been evicted from their homes to make way for the 2012 Olympics in East London.
11	2012 Oct 8	"The British Wrestler"	Rhys James	From the debris of Britain's 1970s' pantomime wrestling, the episode follows Grado, a wrestling fanboy given his own shot at stardom.
12	2013 Jul 16	"Debt Collector"	William Fairman with Rhys James and Graham Johnson	Ten years before, Shaun Smith introduced urban terrorism to the British underworld. Today, he is working as a debt collector in the town of Warrington.
13	2013 Dec 19	"Boy Racer"	Rhys James with Grant Armour	VICE traverses the moonlit A-roads of Britain to embed with one of the most notorious and misunderstood youth subcultures of the last 30 years: the boy racer scene.
14	2014 Jul 1	"Bare Knuckle"	Rhys James	Clive Martin embeds with the bare knuckle boxing elite. What he discovers is not dissimilar to Fight Club; IT technicians, builders, lifestyle coaches and even a solicitor, all throwing their unprotected fists into each other's faces. It is a subculture of honour, pride and violence.
15	2014 Sep 2	"The Moped Gangs of London"	Grant Armour	Daisy-May Hudson lets a nostalgia for the moped gangs of her teenage years get the better of her and travels to industrial estates on the outskirts of London to meet with the underground stars of the UK BikeLife scene.
16	2014 Nov 19	"Young Reoffenders"	Rhys James	VICE meets "Saky's Finest" — a gang of young reoffenders based on the Saxton Road estate in Abingdon, Oxfordshire. Locked into a cycle of reoffending and going to jail, some of them have spent so much of their childhood in Young Offenders' Institutes that they would rather be back inside than in the real world.
17	2015 Apr 15	"Shy Bairns Get Nowt"	Jack Cannon	VICE travels to Newcastle to document the increasing number of Britons who are becoming dependent on food stamps as a consequence of austerity and benefit sanctions.
18	2015 Aug 17	"Searching For Spitman"	Marlon Rouse Tavares	Teenage boys, deviant acts and cold, hard cash – Spitman was a West London council estate myth until the mobile phone footage turned up.
19	2015 Dec 16	"Wolf of the West End"	Rhys James	In the 1980s, "Fast Eddie" Davenport made a name for himself as the host of hedonistic parties for teenage aristocrats. By 2011, he was better known as one of Britain's richest fraudsters.

== See also ==
- The Vice Guide to Travel (2007)
- Vice (TV series) (2013)
- "Rule, Britannia!", song
