= Andy Capper =

British American film director, journalist and editor

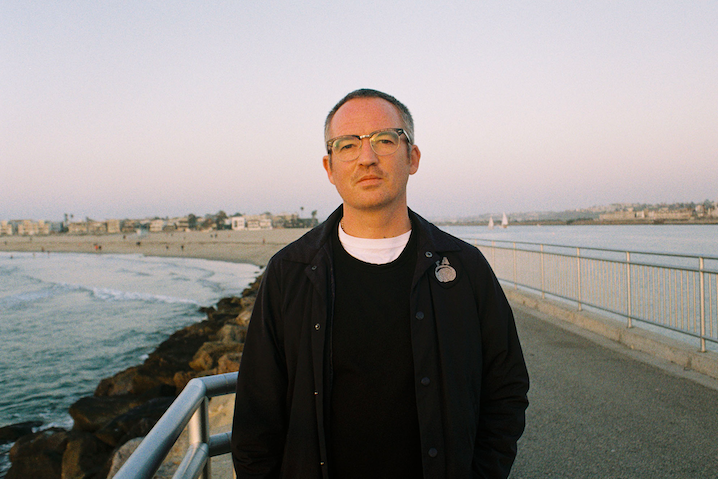
- Born: 14 February 1973 (age 53)
- Occupation: Director / Journalist
- Title: President, Happy Now Film

Andrew Richard Capper (born 14 February 1973) is a British US-based director, journalist and former editor and executive producer at Vice Media. In 2018, he founded Happy Now Film.

== Career ==
Capper's career in journalism started at age 17, reporting on local newspapers in the North West of England. He moved to London at age 25 and started working with the New Musical Express. After a brief period editing Bizarre Magazine, Capper met Shane Smith of Vice Media and introduced him to Andrew Creighton. Capper then started the UK division of Vice with Creighton. From 2002 to November 2017, Capper was Senior Director / Producer / Editor at Vice Media LLC, creating series' such as Rule Britannia, as well co-producing two seasons of the six-part Vice.com series Fashion Week Internationale which later became known as States Of Undress on the VICELAND TV network. In 2014, he created the Vice.com series' Weediquette and The Real, and was awarded an Emmy for segments he produced for Vice's show on the HBO network. Capper was the Executive Producer and Director of the award-winning show Noisey, a two-season series on the VICELAND TV network which featured artists such as Kendrick Lamar, Rick Ross, DJ Khaled, Big Sean, Danny Brown, Diplo, Chief Keef, Common and others.

Capper has directed several promo videos for artists like Snoop Dogg, ASAP Rocky, Vybz Kartel, Fucked Up, Black Lips, Parquet Courts, Turbonegro, Popcaan, Beenie Man and Tifa, as well as creating and producing the Noisey.com franchises Noisey Chiraq, Noisey Jamaica and Noisey Raps. Capper also worked with Jonathan Glazer and J Spaceman of Spiritualized on an installation for The Creators Project at the Coachella Festival which centered on the Spiritualized song "Ladies and Gentlemen We Are Floating In Space". In 2014, he shot a tour documentary around the Brooklyn band Parquet Courts called Light Up Gold Road Trip, which was released 17 April on Noisey.com as the first Noisey Films production.

Capper was a regular contributor to The Guardian and The Observer.

Capper left Vice in late 2017. His last production for the company, "Hollywood Love Story" was a series of cautionary tales about young people and the dark side of modern media. It aired in 2018 and featured Paris Hilton.

In Summer 2022, Capper was appointed COO North America of the APX Film Fund which works to fund projects of narrative, documentary and other IPs.

=== People Like You ===
In 2022, a new feature documentary called People Like You, directed by Capper, was released on the Deeper Movies streaming service. The film is about America's addiction epidemic and its troubled rehab industry through the eyes of a group of mothers.

=== The Choe Show ===
In 2019, Capper worked with the artist David Choe to develop and produce The Choe Show, a limited TV series based around art, recovery and childhood trauma. The show premiered on FX Network June 2021.

=== Reincarnated ===
Capper's feature-length documentary Reincarnated follows the rapper Snoop Dogg's transformation into reggae performer Snoop Lion, premiering at the 2012 Toronto International Film Festival with a theatrical release in April 2013. In January this year he directed two Snoop videos in Jamaica for the companion album Reincarnated: "Lighters Up" featuring Mavado and Popcaan, and "Here Comes The King" featuring Angela Hunte.

=== Lil Bub & Friendz ===
Lil Bub & Friendz premiered at the Tribeca Film Festival on 18 April 2013 and won the Tribeca Online Festival Best Feature Film.

=== VICE ===
Capper produced six segments in the Emmy Award-winning Season Two of the VICE show on HBO, working with hosts Thomas Morton, David Choe and Hamilton Morris.

=== Chiraq ===
Chiraq is an 8-part documentary for Vice's music channel Noisey on the social and cultural forces behind the rise of the Chicago rapper Chief Keef, created by Capper after trips to the city for VICE on the HBO network.

=== Suddenly ===
Suddenly is an hour-long documentary on New York artist ASAP Rocky, directed by David Laven and produced by Capper. It premiered at SXSW.

=== Atlanta ===
Atlanta is a ten part documentary series about drug trafficking and Trap music in the Atlanta area, which was released in 2015. The project was popular and controversial, particularly when a court in Georgia used the series as evidence against the Atlanta rap group Migos in a case where the artists were racially profiled and arrested by the authorities after a show on a university campus.

=== Noisey ===
Eight hour-long films about music and geography for the VICELAND network. Season One: Compton with Kendrick Lamar, São Paulo with Major Lazer, Miami with Rick Ross and DJ Khaled, Jamaica with Popcaan, Chronixx and Jesse Royal, Las Vegas with Tiësto, Steve Angello and Justin Bieber, Detroit with Big Sean and Danny Brown, Chicago with Chief Keef, Lil Durk and Common, London with Giggs, Skepta and Jammer.

The franchise also featured the rapper YG interviewed by a therapist and a special report on gang violence in Chicago. Season Two will air in January 2017.

Season Two: Six hour long films; Bay Area with G-Eazy, E-40, Nashville with Kesha, Paris with Niska, MHD, Seoul with Taeyang of Big Bang, Atlanta with Migos, Lil Yachty, Young Thug, Killer Mike and Lagos with Wizkid and Femi Kuti.

Season Two won the 2017 Realscreen Award for Outstanding Achievement Non-Fiction & Culture.

=== Vice Records ===
As a part of Vice Records, Capper has released music by Black Lips, Mike Bones and Katie Stelmanis.

== Publications ==
- Skins & Punks with Gavin Watson (Vice)
- Heavy Metal In Baghdad with Gabi Sifre (Vice)
- The World According To Vice (Canongate)
- Dos & Donts Compendium (Vice)

== Filmography ==
- The Vice Guide To Liberia (with Shane Smith: Webby Award Winner Best Travel & Adventure doc / People's Choice Winner).
- Rule Britannia (TV series) (2009-2013)
  - Blackpool, Las Vegas Of The North (with Leo Leigh)
  - Swansea Love Story (with Leo Leigh: Webby Award Official Honoree)
  - Beautiful Liverpool (with Leo Leigh)
  - Afghanistan In The UK (with Jason Mojica)
  - Roseboy (with Jamie Lee Curtis Taete and Billie JD Porter)
- Vice News
  - Vice News: Krokodil Tears (with Alison Severs and Al Brown)
  - Vice News: The Vice Guide To Belfast (with Stuart Griffiths and Michael Moynihan)
- Music World: Donk (with Andy Soup)
- The Vice Guide To Sex: Mandingo! (with William Fairman)
- 2013: Lil Bub & Friendz (director)
- 2013: Reincarnated
  - Noisey Chiraq (with Gregory "Beef" Jones)
  - Noisey Jamaica
  - Noisey Jamaica 2
  - Apocalypse, Man
- 2014: SVDDXNLY
  - Weediquette series on Vice.com
  - The Real series on Vice.com
  - Vice News: Jamaican Bud Business
  - Vice News: Ebola In Town!
  - Vice News: Inside Libya's Militias
  - Motherboard: Island Of The Apes
  - Noisey Atlanta
- 2015 to 2016
  - Noisey TV series on VICELAND
  - Season One
  - "Bompton"
  - "São Paulo"
  - "Miami"
  - "Chicago"
  - "Jamaica"
  - "Las Vegas"
  - "London"
- 2017
  - Noisey TV series on VICELAND
  - Winner of the Realscreen 2017 Award for Outstanding Achievement Non-Fiction & Culture
  - Season Two
  - "Bay Area"
  - "Nashville"
  - "Paris"
  - "Seoul"
  - "Atlanta"
  - Lagos"
  - "Lil B: Believe In Earth". A short film about the Bay Area artist Lil B.
  - "The Therapist" TV show on VICELAND: Musicians receive therapy from Dr Siri Sat Nam Singh
- 2018
- Hollywood Love Story: An eight part series for VICELAND with Paris Hilton.
- 2021
  - The Choe Show on FX with David Choe.
- 2022
  - People Like You: America’s addiction epidemic and its troubled rehab industry, through the eyes of a group of mothers.
