= Boss'n Up =

- Directed by: Dylan C. Brown
- Written by: Dylan C. Brown
- Produced by: Snoop Dogg and Dylan C. Brown
- Starring: Shillae Anderson; Snoop Dogg; Hawthorne James; Larry McCoy; Lil Jon; Shillae Anderson; Scruncho; Quazedelic
- Cinematography: Max Da-Yung Wang
- Edited by: Jason Resmer
- Music by: Snoop Dogg
- Distributed by: Snoopadelic Films (USA); Big Pook Films (USA); Geffen Records (music provider) (USA); CodeBlack Entertainment (outside US)
- Release date: December 6, 2005
- Running time: 88 minutes
- Country: United States
- Language: English
- Budget: $550,000 (est.)

Boss'n Up, a musical film inspired by Snoop Dogg's album R&G (Rhythm & Gangsta): The Masterpiece, debuted on 6 December 2005. The film was released in DVD format, and was the first film made under Snoop Dogg's newly-founded production company Snoopadelic Films.

Snoop Dogg stars as a grocery clerk named Cordé Christopher – a young and magnetic man, subject to keen female interest. He becomes a protégé of Orange Juice, an experienced pimp, after being informed of the better and richer life he can lead as a pimp. OJ cultivates Cordé's "talent" and shares street knowledge with him, including the rules of the pimping "game". To some degree, OJ treats Corde like a son. After achieving success, Cordé has to choose between the love of his life, Chardonnay Allen, and his successful career as a pimp.

The cast includes other musicians like Atlanta rapper Lil Jon, who plays the role of Sheriff, a strip club owner who becomes a partner in Corde's business; Dominique, Corde's attractive attorney who frees him from prison; and comedian Scruncho as Hucky G, Corde's own pimping protégé; the film also features a cameo appearance from music producer and P-Funk member Stan "Quazedelic" Harris.

== Box office and business ==
Sales	Revenue	Screens	Country Codes
150.000 copies	$1 million - $2 million	1,000,000 theaters	FR, UK, JP, Television: AUS, RU, BE, LUX, NL

== Awards and nominations ==
Source Awards
Year	Result	Category	Lost to
2006	Nomination	Best Hip Hop Movie	ATL

== List of songs performed or played in the musical interludes ==
- "Powerful" – performed by Blizzard (of the Block Boiz)
- "Perfect" – performed by Snoop Dogg, Pharrell, and Charlie Wilson
- "I Love to Give You Light" – performed by Snoop Dogg, Ricky Harris, and Tanya Devine
- "Panties Lead-In" – performed by Adam Gillohm and Phillip Rodriguez
- "Fresh Pair of Panties On" – performed by Snoop Dogg and J. Black
- "The Battle" – performed by Allokol Peete
- "Girl Like You" – performed by Snoop Dogg
- "The Finer Things" – performed by J*Davey
- "Stay" – performed by Jelly Roll
- "Get 2 Know Ya" – performed by Snoop Dogg and Jelly Roll
- "Closer" – performed by Snoop Dogg
- "Promise I" – performed by Snoop Dogg
- "Supernatural Things Part I" – performed by Ben E. King
- "Boss'n Up (Theme Song)" – performed by Snoop Dogg
- "Remember Me" – performed by Larrance Dopson and Lamar Edwards (of T.I.'s new reality show Life on Mars)
- "Love Don't Go Through No Changes" – performed by Sister Sledge
- "The Bidness" – performed by Snoop Dogg
- "Nights Over Egypt" – performed by The Jones Girls
- "Can You Control Yo Hoe" – performed by Snoop Dogg and Soopafly
- "Drop It Like It's Hot" – performed by Snoop Dogg
- "I'm Threw Witchu" – performed by Snoop Dogg
- "South" – performed by 4chaluv
- "Pass It, Pass It" – performed by Snoop Dogg
- "Hustle & Struggle" – performed by J. Black
- "Full of Fire" – performed by Al Green
- "Helicopter" – performed by Cliff Martinez
- "Let's Get Blown" – performed by Snoop Dogg
- "O-H-I-O" – performed by Ohio Players
- "I Like Everything About You" – performed by Willie Hutch
- "Bongo Instrumental" – performed by Niggerachie
- "Butterfly Blues" – performed by Adam Gillohm and Phillip Rodriguez
- "I Do I Do" – performed by Leroy Hutson
- "Oh No" – performed by Snoop Dogg
- "Now at Last" – performed by Feist
- "Cold Cold World" – performed by Teddy Pendergrass
- "No Thang on Me" – performed by Snoop Dogg and Bootsy Collins
- "Step Yo Game Up" – performed by Snoop Dogg, Lil Jon, and Trina
- "Ups & Downs" – performed by Snoop Dogg (and The Bee Gees)

== Bonus CD ==
1. Get 2 Know Ya (Feat. Jelly Roll) (Produced by Jelly Roll) - 03:38
2. Drop It Like It's Hot (Remix) (Feat. Pharrell & Jay-Z) (Produced by The Neptunes) - 04:16
3. No Sticks, No Seeds - 04:19 (Produced by Terrace Martin)
4. Shake That Shit (Feat. Tiffany Foxxx & Young Watt) (Produced by Terrace Martin)- 03:49

AMG

== Singles ==
1. Get to Know Ya - digital download on MSN.
