= Reincarnated (film) =

- Film poster
- Directed by: Andy Capper
- Produced by: Codine Williams; Justin Li
- Starring: Snoop Lion
- Cinematography: Nick Neofitidis; Willie Toledo; William Fairman
- Edited by: Bernardo Loyola; Dave Gutt; Emily Wilson; Jared Perez
- Music by: Snoop Lion
- Production companies: Snoopadelic Films; VICE Films
- Distributed by: VICE Films
- Release dates: September 7, 2012 (Toronto International Film Festival); March 21, 2013
- Running time: 96 minutes
- Countries: United Kingdom; United States
- Language: English

Reincarnated is a 2013 documentary film about the musician Snoop Dogg's explorations of reggae and Rastafari culture, and his transformation into Snoop Lion. It premiered at the Toronto International Film Festival on September 7, 2012, and was released to theaters March 21, 2013. It is a companion film to his 12th studio album, Reincarnated. The film was shot by Andy Capper of Vice Magazine.

== Background ==
From the start, Snoop was known for his gangsta raps, G-funk beats, and reckless lifestyle. His popularity started back when he was a member of Death Row Records, where he released his debut album Doggystyle. The album sold more copies than any debut album ever had, making “Snoop Doggy Dogg” a well-known name. Though he was famous for being “gangsta,” Snoop had shown that he wanted peace as well; especially after he just missed a conviction for murder in 1996 which helped him further himself even more from all the conflict happening in the industry around that time. More recently, his peaceful and nonviolent state of mind became more evident, as he decided to begin participating the Rastafari faith, give himself a new name, and take on a new style of music.

== Plot ==
As most of those who follow the Rastafari faith do, Snoop decided to go through a transformation into his new self; his new, Rastafari self. Reincarnated documents Snoop Dogg's transition into Snoop Lion, which involved him taking a trip to Jamaica to make a reggae album and discover more about the Rastafari faith. The documentary starts out by exploring Snoop's past; his time on Death Row Records, the loss of his friends Tupac and Nate Dogg, and the murder accusation. The focus then shifts to his spiritual journey and new style of music. While in Jamaica, Snoop collaborated with a few famous reggae artists, including Bunny Wailer and Diplo, to create the Reincarnated album, which focuses on love and nonviolence. Wailer was Snoop's guide throughout the trip, leading him through his journey into Rastafari. The film includes many intimate moments with Snoop, where he discusses his personal thoughts and reasons for becoming Rasta. The documentary also includes the heavy marijuana smoking in which Snoop participated, which is a common practice among Rastafari, and a common stereotype of how they practice their faith as well.

== Production ==
The film was directed and produced by Andy Capper of Vice Magazine. Capper followed Snoop to Jamaica to record the transformation, and gathered intimate interview footage with him as well. Roughly 200 hours of footage was shot, which was then edited in a two-month span. The documentary was aired at SXSW and The Toronto International Film Festival in 2012.

== Cast ==
- Dr. Dre
- Daz Dillinger
- Angela Hunte
- Ariel Rechtshaid
- Dre Skull
- Jahdan Blakkamoore
- Andrew aka Moon Bain
- Bunny Wailer
- Damian Marley
- Dave Dale and The Blue Mountain Coffee House Boys
- Sister Shirley Chung and Winston Martin
- The Alpha Boys
- Scaby Dread and the Dudus Family
- Cutty Corn
- Louis Farrakhan
- Shante Broadus
- Cori B.
- Maxine Stowe
- Stewart Copeland
- Diplo
- Snoop Dogg

== Reception ==
In a review from The New York Times, writer Andy Webster states, “enlightenment isn’t as evident here as much as a woozy weariness, perhaps a long-term byproduct of being very, very stoned,” regarding the authenticity of Snoop's journey throughout the film. In a review from the Los Angeles Times, writer Mikael Wood explains that the documentary does not teach viewers anything new about Snoop, and that it seems like “just another component in the new album's marketing plan. In two other reviews by Shaka Griffith and Rich Cline, there was mention of lack of authenticity as well; neither could say if the transformation should really be taken seriously. After the film was released, Bunny Wailer made a statement where he indicted Snoop of “outright fraudulent use” of the Rastafari faith.
