= I'll Be Next Door for Christmas =

2018 film by David Jay Willis

- Directed by: David Jay Willis
- Written by: David Jay Willis; Jenna Park
- Produced by: Jay Kogen
- Starring: Nicole Sullivan; Atticus Shaffer; Jonathan Mangum; Beth Littleford; Regan Burns; Lil Bub
- Cinematography: Chase Bowman
- Edited by: Pelham Grenville; Julie Tseselsky Kirschner
- Music by: Tamara Douglas-Morris
- Release date: December 4, 2018
- Running time: 100 minutes
- Country: United States
- Language: English

I'll Be Next Door for Christmas is a 2018 American comedy film directed by David Jay Willis and starring Nicole Sullivan, Atticus Shaffer, Jonathan Mangum, Beth Littleford, Regan Burns and Lil Bub in her final film role. The movie was released worldwide on Amazon Prime and iTunes.

It is the first feature length film in the United States to successfully use Equity Crowdfunding to raise its budget, with 893 investors.

== Premise ==
I'll Be Next Door for Christmas is a story of a sixteen-year-old girl, Nicky, who lives in Santa Clarita, California, with her family who are crazy for the Christmas holidays. Her family's over-the-top Christmas celebrations have made her life miserable. At a special summer camp for musicians and actors, Nicky meets the boy of her dreams, Tanner (Bolanos). Tanner decides to visit her from Connecticut, along with his father, for the Christmas holidays. But Nicky doesn't want to get her family in front of Tanner, so she hires actors to play her parents and arranges a fake Christmas dinner in the empty house next door.

== Cast ==
- Nicole Sullivan as Ms. James
- Atticus Shaffer as Archie
- Jonathan Mangum as Bradley
- Beth Littleford as Fran
- Regan Burns as Chris
- Lil Bub as Parsley the Cat
- Javier Bolanos as Tanner
- Juliette Angelo as Nicky
- Kirrilee Berger as Stephanie
- Susan Chuang as Patty
- Carmine Caridi as Ancient Man
- Eve Brenner as Gramma
- Gonzalo Martin as Jason
- London Fuller as Noelle
- Hannah McCloud 13-Year-Old Nicky

== Reception ==
Common Sense Media gave the film 3 stars out of 5.

== See also ==
- List of Christmas films
