= Dirty Hands: The Art and Crimes of David Choe =

- Directed by: Harry Kim
- Produced by: Harry Kim; Elizabeth Ai
- Starring: David Choe
- Cinematography: Harry Kim; Johnny Granado
- Edited by: Daniel Freedman; Harry Kim; Heather Lenz
- Production company: Dirty Hands Film
- Release date: 21 June 2008 (United States: limited)
- Running time: 92 minutes
- Country: United States
- Language: English

Dirty Hands: The Art and Crimes of David Choe is a 2008 documentary film about the painter and graffiti artist David Choe, directed by Harry Kim.

Over more than a decade, Kim filmed the most intimate and dramatic moments of his best friend Choe's colorful life as an artist. Dirty Hands began as a film school project, but gradually expanded into a half-hour film entitled Whales and Orgies, then a feature-length documentary. The film was premiered at the Los Angeles Film Festival on June 21, 2008, and had a theatrical premiere at the Roxie Theater in San Francisco in May 2010. The end credits' song was produced by the Grammy-nominated music producer Dr. Luke.
