= White Lightnin' =

- Theatrical poster
- Directed by: Dominic Murphy
- Written by: Eddy Moretti; Shane Smith
- Produced by: Sam Taylor; Mike Downey
- Starring: Edward Hogg; Carrie Fisher; Muse Watson
- Cinematography: Tim Maurice-Jones
- Edited by: Sam Sneade
- Production companies: Vice Films; UK Film Council; Film and Music Entertainment; Mainframe Productions; The Salt Company International
- Distributed by: Momentum Pictures
- Release dates: 19 January 2009 (Sundance Film Festival); 25 September 2009 (United Kingdom)
- Running time: 92 minutes
- Country: United Kingdom
- Language: English
- Budget: $2 million

White Lightnin' is a 2009 dramatic film directed by Dominic Murphy and written by Eddy Moretti and Shane Smith. It stars Edward Hogg, Carrie Fisher, Muse Watson. Inspired by the life of Jesco White, an Appalachian mountain dancer, it was shown at the 2009 Sundance Film Festival.

== Plot ==
Jesco White is the last of the West Virginia mountain dancers. He is the son of D. Ray White, a highly acclaimed mountain dancer. Ever since Jesco was a child, D. Ray tried to keep him on a straight path. But from a young age, he was tempted by drugs and drawn away from dancing. There were the voices in his head, tormenting him.

Hooked on sniffing gas, glue, lighter fluid, and airplane cement, Jesco was constantly finding himself in trouble with the law. He landed in the reform school more than once, and it was here that he spent most of his adolescence, left to endure the horror of the voices.

Years after his time in reform school, Jesco had made the best of staying true to his daddy's word. He tried to stay as straight as he could, and used the dancing to do so. But the devil has his ways too, and soon Jesco was back to his old vices. On his way around the south, dancing and performing in whatever local dives he could, Jesco met the woman of his dreams—four-foot three-inch Enid Carter. Jesco renames her Percilla. An off-beat pair, the two managed to keep all their wickedness inside the family.

Long and Davie—the two men responsible for dragging D. Ray years earlier behind their pickup until he was dead, are released from prison because of a trial error. It was as though God were testing Jesco again, tempting him with the taste of revenge. And so this temptation is satisfied, and Jesco got the revenge he craved, brutally torturing and murdering the two. After accidentally killing the officer who comes to arrest Jesco, he takes to the woods. Jesco hid himself in the cabin deep in the West Virginia hills previously inhabited by the preacher, whose voice Jesco constantly hears in his head. Jesco encounters God, cutting and chopping himself until he dies to expiate himself of his sins.

== Cast ==
- Edward Hogg as Jesco White
  - Owen Campbell as Young Jesco White
- Carrie Fisher as Cilla
- Kirk Bovill as Long
- Muse Watson as D. Ray White

=== Gallery ===
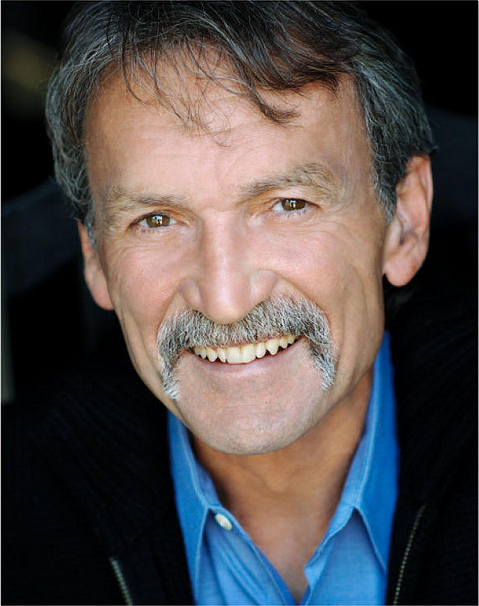
Muse Watson (pictured in 2009) played the protagonist's father D. Ray White

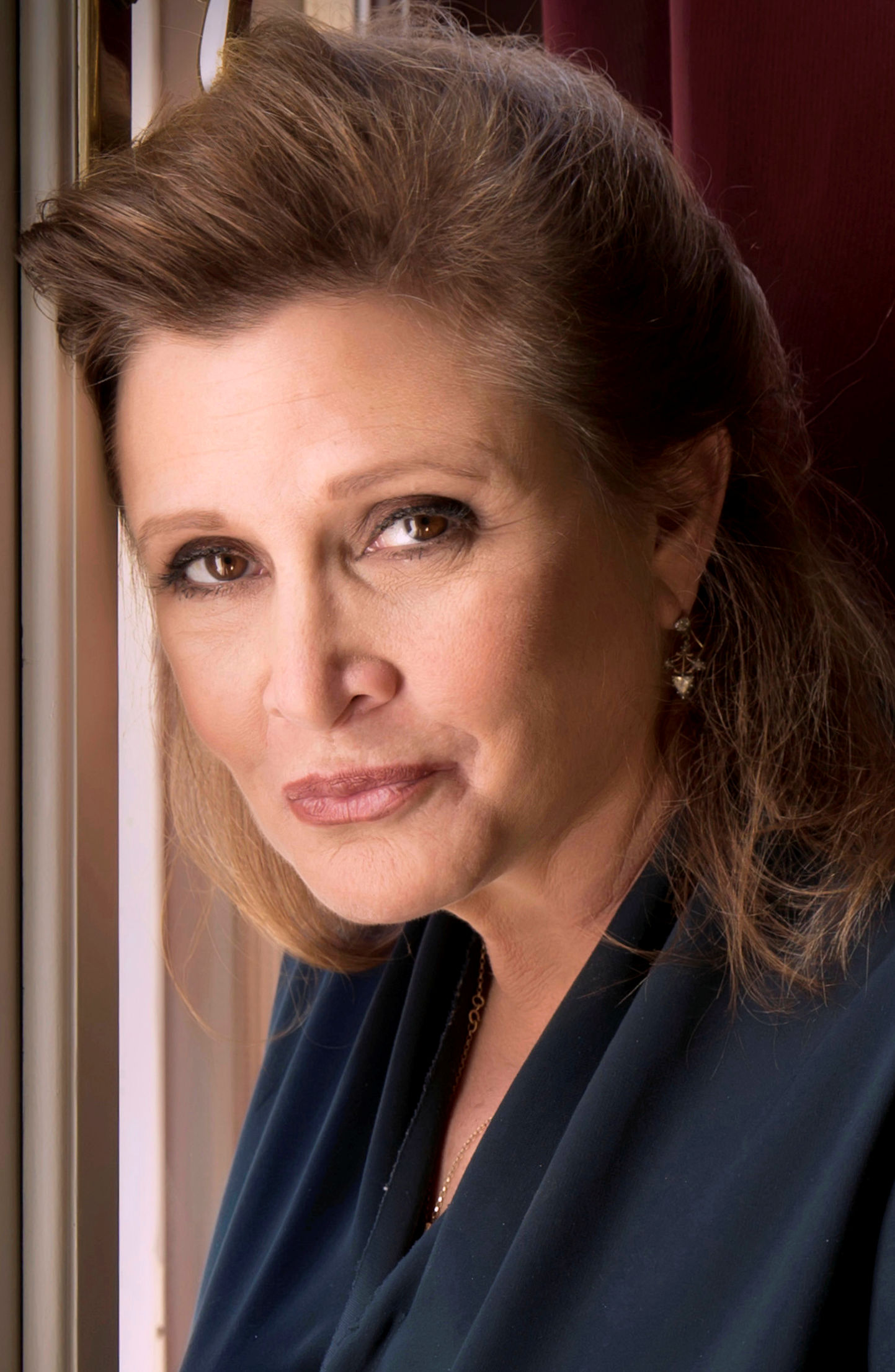
Carrie Fisher (pictured in 2013) played Cilla

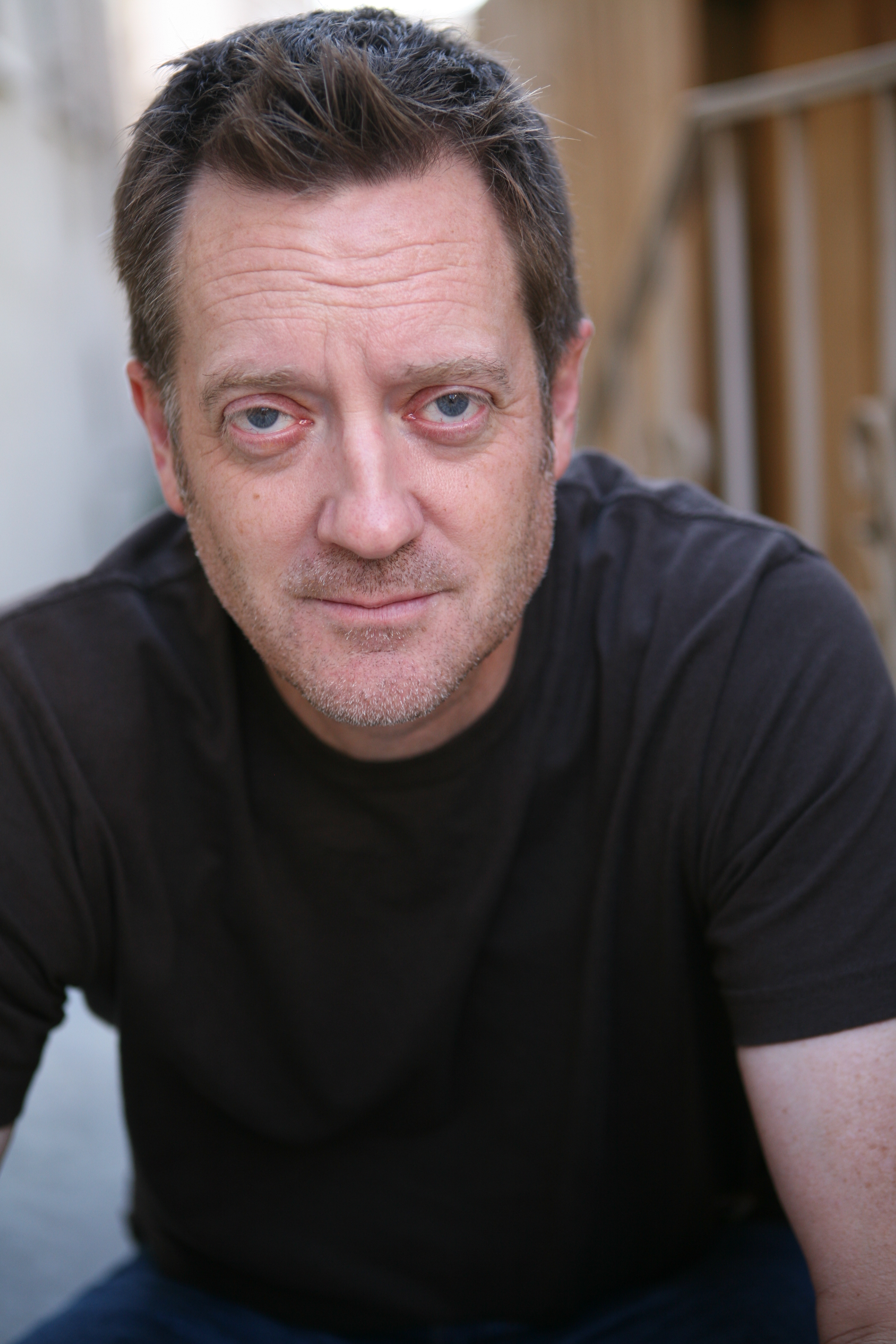
Kirk Bovill (pictured 2009) played Long

== Production ==
White Lightnin' was filmed with a $2 million budget. Although the story takes place in West Virginia it was mostly filmed in Croatia, though additional shooting was done in West Virginia.

== Reception ==
White Lightnin' received positive reviews from critics receiving an 81% based on 16 reviews on Rotten Tomatoes.

== Awards ==
- Golden Gateway of India Award 11th Mumbai Film Festival 2009
- "Golden Hitchcock" at the Dinard Festival of British Film, 2009
- Fantasia Festival "Jury Prize for Best First Feature"
- British Independent Film Awards Most Promising Newcomer for Edward Hogg
