= Lil Bub & Friendz =

- Release poster
- Directed by: Andy Capper; Juliette Eisner
- Produced by: Juliette Eisner
- Cinematography: Danilo Parra
- Edited by: Devin Yuceil
- Production company: Vice Media
- Release date: April 18, 2013 (Tribeca Film Festival)
- Running time: 65 minutes
- Country: United States
- Language: English

Lil Bub & Friendz is a 2013 documentary directed by Andy Capper and Juliette Eisner. It stars Lil Bub and her owner Mike Bridavsky and looks at cats on the Internet, Internet memes and viral videos. Lil Bub & Friendz premiered at the Tribeca Film Festival on April 18, 2013, and won the Tribeca Online Festival Best Feature Film.

== Synopsis ==
The film follows Lil Bub and Bridavsky as they visit other "cat-lebrities" and go to the first Internet Cat Video Film Festival in Minneapolis, Minnesota. The film has appearances of Keyboard Cat, Nyan Cat and Grumpy Cat and an interview with their self-described "meme manager" Ben Lashes.

== Cast ==
- Lil Bub as herself
- Mike Bridavsky as himself
- Keyboard Cat (Bento) as herself
- Grumpy Cat as herself
- Ben Lashes as himself, a self-described "meme manager"

== Production ==
=== Development ===
Eisner's original pitch was a video short about "crazy cat people" at the first Internet Cat Video Film Festival. Eisner contacted Lil Bub and Bridavsky because Vice worked with them on an earlier video. Capper and Eisner knew that Lil Bub would be the star as soon as they met her. They decided to make a full-length film after seeing the turnout of 10,000 people at the festival in Minneapolis including travelers from New York City, China and Seattle. Filming took five months.

During filming Lil Bub had a serious health episode but recovered. Bridavsky called it "a very scary week" and Capper said "this is going to be the most depressing cat movie ever."

=== Promotion ===
Vice created three movie posters including a parody of Jaws with Lil Bub looking up at a swimming woman and a shot from her photoshoot with Bullett Magazine. Complex ran "Lil BUB Week" leading up to the premiere.

== Release ==
=== Tribeca Film Festival ===
Lil Bub & Friendz premiered at the Tribeca Film Festival on April 18, 2013. It was also screened at the Tribeca Drive-In and Tribeca Online Festival. Lil Bub, Bridavsky, Capper and Eisner attended the Tribeca Drive-In outdoor screening at the World Financial Center Plaza on April 20. Lil Bub did a petting and photo session. Festival co-head Robert De Niro met Lil Bub at the Director's Brunch on April 23 after co-head Jane Rosenthal quipped to The Hollywood Reporter "I keep saying Little Bub needs to meet Big Bob." Lil Bub & Friendz won the Tribeca Online Festival Best Feature Film.

=== Screenings ===
Lil Bub & Friendz was screened at the Seattle International Film Festival. It was shown at Metro Chicago on October 10 raising $1,800 for Tree House Humane Society.

=== Online ===
The movie was released online on the VICE website on September 6, 2013.
