= Snoopadelic Films =

American film production company

Snoopadelic Films Inc.
- Company type: Private / independent
- Industry: Film production
- Founded: 2005; 21 years ago
- Headquarters: Claremont, CA
- Key people: Snoop Dogg
- Products: Boss'n Up (2005); Hood of Horror (2006)

Snoopadelic Films (formerly known as Doggfather Ent.) is an American film production company, founded by rapper Snoop Dogg in 2005, and distributed through MCA. Its primary profile is endorsing and releasing DVDs related to Snoop Dogg.

== Crew ==
- Dylan C. "Pook" Brown - director
- Calvin Broadus - producer

== Movies ==
=== Endorsements ===
- Tha Eastsidaz (DVD) (2000) (Double Platinum)
- Snoop Dogg's Hustlaz: Diary of a Pimp (DVD) (2002)

=== Production ===
- Snoop Dogg presents... Welcome to the House - The Doggumentary (DVD) (2002)
- Boss'n Up (DVD) (2005)
- Hood of Horror (2006)
- Reincarnated (2013)
- Martha & Snoop's Potluck Dinner Party (2016)
- Meet the Blacks (2016)
- Snoop Dogg Presents The Joker's Wild (2018)
- Go-Big Show (2021)

=== Videos ===
- Latoiya Williams - Fallen Star (excerpt from The Doggumentary)

=== Books ===
- Love Don't Live Here No More, Doggy Tales Vol.1
