= Vice Media =

American-Canadian digital media and broadcasting company

Vice Media Group LLC
- Logo of the Vice Media Group LLC

- Primary logo used by various assets
- Type: Joint venture
- Industry: Mass media
- Founded: 1994; 32 years ago
- Founders: Suroosh Alvi; Shane Smith; Gavin McInnes
- Headquarters: Montreal, Quebec, Canada (1994–2001); Brooklyn, New York City, U.S. (2001–present)
- Key people: Adam Stotsky (CEO)
- Brands: Vice; UnTypical; Viceland; Noisey; Motherboard; Broadly; Munchies; The Creators Project; Thump; Fightland; Waypoint; Tonic; Pulse Films; SWG; Virtue Worldwide; Garage
- Revenue: ▲$125 million (2012)
- Owners: Fortress Investment Group; Soros Fund Management; Monroe Capital
- Number of employees: 1,000+
- Website: vicemedia.com

Vice Media Group LLC is a Canadian-American digital media and broadcasting company. Following its 2023 bankruptcy and acquisition by a consortium of its former creditors, Vice Media reorganized its operations around Vice Studios, Vice Sports (which includes Vice TV), Vice Commercials, Vice News, and the advertising agency Virtue. In June 2025, Adam Stotsky was appointed chief executive officer, succeeding Bruce Dixon.

The original Vice magazine was founded and based in Montreal, and co-founded by Suroosh Alvi, Shane Smith, and Gavin McInnes. Developed from the magazine, Vice Media expanded primarily into youth and young adult-focused digital media. This included online content verticals and related web series, a news division, a film production studio, and a record label, among other properties. Vice re-located to New York City in 2001.

Vice News was known for broadcasting news programs on HBO; including the Emmy-winning weekly self-titled documentary series, which premiered in April 2013, and features segments on global issues hosted by co-founders Smith and Alvi, and a rotating cast of correspondents. A spin-off, Vice News Tonight, premiered 10 October 2016 and showcased a nightly roundup of global news, technology, the environment, economics, and pop culture while eschewing traditional news anchors.

On 10 June 2019, HBO announced Vice News Tonight's cancellation, in addition to ending relations with Vice Media, after a seven-year partnership. In August 2019, it was reported that the company was laying off staff as part of a shift towards news that would involve merging Viceland and Vice News. In April 2023, it was announced that Vice Media was restructuring and downsizing its news division. A month later, once valued at $5.7 billion, Vice filed for Chapter 11 bankruptcy and agreed to be acquired by a consortium led by Fortress Investment Group for $350 million in June.

In February of 2024, Vice's former CEO Bruce Dixon announced additional layoffs and that Vice.com would cease publishing content. In July 2025, Vice published new content. Vice has since partnered with other media companies, such as Savage Ventures, to distribute its content.

== History ==
=== Founding and early years (1994–2005) ===
Voice (later Voices of Montreal) was founded by Alix Laurent of Interimages Communications in October 1994, with Suroosh Alvi as editor and Gavin McInnes as assistant editor, with Shane Smith joining the magazine's staff later. It initially focused on drug culture, skateboarding, art, music, and trends. The magazine focused on Montreal's alternative cultural scene, to compete with the already established Montreal Mirror. Alvi, McInnes and Smith bought out the publisher and changed the magazine's name to Vice in 1996.

As the magazine became more successful, the company received an investment of $4 million by Canadian investor Richard Szalwinski and Vice relocated to New York City in 1999. In 2001, the co-founders bought Vice back and moved to new offices in Williamsburg, Brooklyn.

=== Digital expansion (2006–2011) ===
In 2006, on the advice of creative director Spike Jonze, Vice began expanding into digital video, launching new video service VBS.tv as a joint venture with MTV Networks. VBS gained a fan base with shows like The Vice Guide To Travel, Epicly Later'd, Toxic and Hamilton's Pharmacopeia.

In 2007, Vice Media began expanding its digital video operation, launching new channels, such as Motherboard (tech), Noisey (music), and The Creators Project, an arts/technology site founded in partnership with Intel. Vice Media would later launch sites around electronic music culture (Thump), global news (Vice News), food (Munchies) and sports (Vice Sports). Additionally, Vice Media launched Virtue Worldwide, a creative services agency, to expand their capabilities for work around their platforms. During this time, Santiago Stelley was the director of content of VBS.tv (2006–2010) and creative director of Vice Media (2010–2012).

In January 2008, co-founder Gavin McInnes left Vice Media due to "creative differences" with the company, and founded the website streetcarnage.com. He later co-founded Rooster, an advertising agency, and became a far-right activist, founding the Proud Boys.

In 2009, Vice transformed from a counterculture print magazine into a digitalized video and media pioneer.

By 2010, Vice Media was rapidly expanding away from its origins as a print skate zine into an online video powerhouse. Founder Shane Smith began aggressively pitching Vice as the future of media, infamously claiming it would become "the next MTV, ESPN, and CNN rolled into one."

According to Columbia Journalism Review, Vice has altered shots during the editing process in pursuit of more entertaining or impressive scenes. In a 2011 documentary on Libya, a voiceover from the reporter claims that he had gone to the frontlines amidst an offensive, while in contrast a source claims the reporter did not make the trip, with only a cameraman going there.

=== Further expansion (2012–2017) ===
In 2012, Vice Media continued to expand its coverage focused around news and current events.

With the end of VBS.tv, Vice began releasing films like UK's Scariest Debt Collector, Swansea Love Story, World's Scariest Drug and Inside the Superhuman World of the Iceman through their main website and YouTube channel, as well as new series like Slutever, Fringes, Love Industry and High Society.

In mid-August 2013, Rupert Murdoch's 21st Century Fox invested US$70 million in Vice Media, resulting in a 5% stake. Following the announcement, Smith explained: "We have set ourselves up to build a global platform but we have maintained control." In 2013, Vice Media premiered a new 30-minute news program for HBO titled Vice, executive produced by Bill Maher. In 2014, the second season of the show won a Creative Arts Emmy Award for Outstanding Informational Series or Special in the 66th Primetime Creative Arts Emmy Awards. In 2014, Vice Media launched its news channel, Vice News, which almost immediately gained global attention for its coverage of protests and conflict in Ukraine and Venezuela. As of October 2014, the editor of BBC Radio 1's Newsbeat claimed the BBC was "playing catch-up" to Vice News.

Vice Media has routinely advocated for their "immersionist" brand of journalism in the pursuit of more authentic and interesting stories. Their founders and editors have regularly garnered controversy from the likes of The New York Times' David Carr, who bristled in an exchange with Shane Smith in the 2011 documentary Page One: Inside the New York Times. In a 2014 Time column, Carr said that Vice had since grown into a strong news entity. In August 2014, Carr published a New York Times column further reversing his earlier criticism of Vice, saying: "Being the crusty old-media scold felt good at the time, but recent events suggest that Vice is deadly serious about doing real news that people, yes, even young people, will actually watch."

On 2 July 2014, Vice Media announced that it would be relocating into a warehouse space in Williamsburg that had been occupied by the independent arts spaces and concert venues 285 Kent, Death by Audio and Glasslands, among others. Vice and the building property owners facilitated the clearance of the building and the displacement of the existing creative tenants. Vice spent US$20 million to renovate the 60,000-square-foot (5,600 m^{2}) building as part of an eight-year lease, facilitating the establishment of new production facilities with full broadcast capabilities, and received an offer of US$6.5 million in tax credits from New York state's Empire State Development. In August 2014, A&E Networks, a television group jointly owned by The Walt Disney Company and Hearst Corporation, made a US$250-million investment in Vice Media for an ownership stake of 10%. In November and December 2015, Disney made two additional individual investments of US$200 million totalling $400 million.

On 26 March 2015, HBO announced it would renew its contract to broadcast the weekly Vice documentary series for four years, while expanding the annual broadcast schedule from 14 to nearly 30 episodes. The network also announced Vice would be launching a nightly news program. The show, entitled Vice News Tonight, premiered on 10 October 2016 and was planned to run 48 weeks each year, featuring pre-edited video and graphics segments covering global news, technology, the environment, economics and pop culture, while eschewing the use of live TV anchors. In November 2015, Vice and A&E Networks announced Viceland, a then-upcoming cable network that would feature Vice-produced content.

In June 2016, Vice announced an aggressive expansion strategy to launch television and digital services in more than 50 new countries, including India, regions of the Middle East, Africa, and Southeast Asia, pushing its total reach from 30 to over 80 territories.

On 14 March 2017, Vice announced an expanded original programming deal with Snap Inc. The new deal built on Vice's previous deal to serve as a 2015 global launch partner on the Snapchat Discover platform. The first program planned under the new deal was Hungry Hearts with Action Bronson, starring the titular rapper. That same month, Vice announced a wide range of content deals which would make its programming available in more than 80 territories by the end of 2017.

In June 2017, Vice secured a $450 million investment from private-equity firm TPG Capital to increase spending on scripted programming and ongoing international expansion. As a result of the deal, Vice Media was valued at $5.7 billion. In September 2018, Disney wrote down its investment in Vice by $157 million. Disney acquired Fox's stake in Vice when its acquisition of 21st Century Fox completed in March 2019.

On 23 December 2017, The New York Times reported that there had been four settlements involving allegations of sexual harassment or defamation against Vice employees. In addition, over 20 other women stated that they had experienced or witnessed sexual misconduct, including unwanted kisses, groping, lewd remarks and propositions for sex at the company. In a statement provided to The New York Times, Vice co-founders Shane Smith and Suroosh Alvi said, "from the top down, we have failed as a company to create a safe and inclusive workplace where everyone, especially women, can feel respected and thrive."

In January 2018, Vice's COO/CFO Sarah Broderick sent a memo to staff on 2 January 2018 announcing President Creighton had volunteered to go on temporary leave whilst a new investigation into a $135,000 settlement from a case the company paid in 2016 to a former employee who alleged she was fired after turning him down, and the suspension of Mike Germano, who had served as chief digital officer. Germano founded Carrot Creative, which was acquired by Vice in 2013; he was accused of pulling a former colleague onto his lap at a company party, as well as telling his former strategist Amanda Rue he originally did not want to hire her "because he wanted to have sex with her." Vice has also been criticized by current and former employees for featuring work by Terry Richardson, a photographer facing accusations of sexual abuse by multiple models. In another documentary, a former female employee covering a story about sex workers in a developing country said Vice attempted to "sensationalize and exploit" the women depicted. In one occasion, producers requested her to go undercover as a prostitute, which she refused. She also remarks being oriented to swear more while on camera.

=== Decline (2018–2022) ===
In March 2018, Vice Media co-founder Shane Smith announced he would no longer continue as CEO and would take on the new title of Executive Chairman. Former A+E Networks CEO Nancy Dubuc succeeded Smith as CEO. "Smith will now be focused on creating content and strategic deals and partnerships to help grow the company." On 20 August 2018, Vice's Munchies and Fremantle Media signed a deal with Triple Five Group to gain control of the food hall at American Dream Meadowlands. The food hall was expected to open in April 2019. In November 2018, The Wall Street Journal reported that Vice Media was looking to trim its workforce by 10–15%, relying on attrition rather than layoffs. The same month, CEO Nancy Dubuc told an audience at The New York Times Dealbook conference that Vice would return to profitability the following year. In March 2019, it was reported that Vice Media was looking to raise another $200 million in funding.

On 1 May 2019, Vice consolidated many of its web channels back into one central platform turning them into feature sections. The move included independent Munchies, Noisey, Motherboard, Broadly, Free, Amuse, Tonic, Waypoint, and Vice Sports. Vice also ended its block on the ad industry's keyword blacklist of 25 terms. On 3 May 2019, Vice Media announced that it raised $250 million in debt from George Soros and other investors. In October, Vice Media announced that it was acquiring Refinery29. The deal, worth a reported $400 million, valued the combined company at $4 billion.

In May 2020, Vice Media announced they were laying off more than 150 staff due to financial difficulties. In June 2020, Vice Media launched an investigation into allegations of subsidiary Refinery29's toxic work environment.

In March 2020, Vice Media organized the Azimuth Music Festival in Saudi Arabia, less than two years after Vice paused all work in Saudi Arabia following the assassination of Jamal Khashoggi. Vice's brand was not used on marketing material, and contractors had to sign non-disclosure agreements regarding Vice's involvement. Vice opened a commercial and creative office in Riyadh in 2022. On 2 October 2020, Vice Media Group appointed Nadja Bellan-White as the global CMO, to be in charge of worldwide branding, communications and promotions. It was also announced that Meera Pattni had been promoted to VP Communications, directly reporting to Bellan-White.

In April 2021, Van Scott, former ABC News communications executive, joined Vice as VP Corporate Communications to lead communications in the US. Scott would report to Laura Misselbrook, Global SVP Communications, based in London.

In April 2021, Vice Media was criticized by Cambodians after publishing colorized images of the victims of the Khmer Rouge Genocide, some of which had smiles photoshopped onto their faces. Vice later admitted to the images being photoshopped and said that "We regret the error and will investigate how this failure of the editorial process occurred."

In March 2021, it was claimed that "VICE Media Group is the world's largest independent youth media company", with offices in 35 cities across the world. Its five key businesses were listed as: Vice.com (digital content); Vice Studios (film and TV production); Vice TV; Vice News; and Virtue (an agency offering creative services). In September 2021, it was reported that Vice raised another investment round following cancelled plans to go public via special purpose acquisition company (SPAC).

In 2022, Vice Media experienced severe financial and operational headwinds. Failing to meet its $700 million revenue target, they fell at $100 million, but they ended up with $600 million.Despite the shortfall and stalled sale talks with Antenna Group, Vice's news division ended up earning 10 Emmy Awards for its journalism.

=== Bankruptcy and sale (2023–present) ===
In January 2023, Vice began exploring the possibility of selling itself. On 24 February 2023, Dubuc left as CEO as the company faced problems with turning an annual profit and finding a buyer. Bruce Dixon and Hozefa Lokhandwala were appointed co-CEOs on 27 February, a few days after Dubuc's departure. It was announced in April 2023 that Vice Media was restructuring and downsizing its Vice News division due to budget problems. This action included the cancellation of Vice News Tonight and other programs and the layoffs of dozens of employees.

On 1 May 2023, The New York Times reported that Vice was preparing to file for bankruptcy. According to Deadline, Vice's primary debt-holder, Fortress Investment Group, would likely take control of Vice Media as a result of any Chapter 11 bankruptcy filing.

Two weeks later, on 15 May, Vice Media formally filed for Chapter 11 bankruptcy as part of a possible sale to a consortium of lenders including Fortress Investment Group, which would, alongside Soros Fund Management and Monroe Capital, invest $225 million as a credit bid for nearly all of its assets. The following month, Vice accepted the consortium's increased offer of $350 million prior to the bankruptcy auction. The company drew criticism for generous executive compensation packages while employees dealt with layoffs and unpaid company bills. The sale was closed in August 2023. Lokhandwala resigned as co-CEO in December, leaving Bruce Dixon as sole CEO.

On 22 February 2024, CEO Bruce Dixon announced "several hundred" additional layoffs as part of a company restructuring. Dixon also announced that the Vice.com website would no longer publish content, instead partnering with other media companies to distribute its content, and that the company was discussing the sale of Refinery29.

The New York Times highlighted that "over the past half-decade, Vice has had near annual layoffs and mounting losses, and has filed for bankruptcy, making it the poster child for the battered digital-media industry" and that while "some observers hoped its new owners [...] would reinvest" in the company, Fortress Investment Group had instead "decided to make sweeping cuts". Chris Thompson of Defector commented that "admirers of Vice's journalism—Vice News and Motherboard, both of which were largely kerploded during Vice's bankruptcy, had made themselves essential with years of excellent reporting—have long daydreamed about a future where its owners and executives stopped trying to turn it into a leprechaun's pot of gold and just allowed it to be a good website. [...] Instead of protecting it as responsible stewards, they treated it more or less the way Paul Cicero treated the Bamboo Lounge in Goodfellas, fattening themselves at its expense until there was nothing left to rob, and then burning it to the ground".

In April 2024, Vice Media sold Refinery29 to Essence magazine owner Sundial Media Group. Later that month, Vice Media announced it had restructured its global production business, now called Vice Studios Group, into five units: Pulse Films, UnTypical (formerly Vice Studios), Vice Studios LatAm, Vice Studios Canada and a news documentary unit. Vice Studios Group will be led by Jamie Hall and Danny Gabai as co-presidents. In May, Vice Media announced it will create a joint venture with Savage Venture to relaunch its websites, such as Vice.com, Munchies, Motherboard, and Noisey. In September, Vice Media relaunched its print magazine which had been on hiatus since 2019. Issues will be released quarterly. The company has a goal of reaching 20,000 subscribers within a year.

Vice Studios selected ITV Studios as its exclusive global distribution partner in February 2025. The agreement covered nearly 2,000 hours of Vice programming and included future productions from Vice Studios.

In June 2025, Vice Media appointed former NBCUniversal and Dick Clark Productions executive Adam Stotsky as Chief Executive Officer, succeeding Bruce Dixon. The company stated that Stotsky would lead its next phase of growth, focusing on expanding Vice Studios, Vice Sports, Vice Commercials, Vice News, and the advertising agency Virtue.

Vice Media secured a $75 million credit facility from Western Alliance Bank in August 2025 to support the expansion of Vice Studios. The company said the financing would support a five-year investment in developing and producing scripted and unscripted content for television, streaming, and digital platforms.

Vice Media appointed Joseph Friedman as chief financial officer and Devak Shah as chief strategy officer in January 2026, with both reporting to Stotsky. In March, Vice Studios appointed Adam Kassan as executive vice president of scripted film and television and Cat Lawson as executive vice president of unscripted, and promoted Claire Marshall to head of international scripted and Paul Randle to managing director of Vice Studios UK and global head of business affairs.

== Key business properties ==
=== Magazine ===
Vice began as a counterculture print magazine founded in 1996 in Montreal, Quebec, Canada, when Suroosh Alvi, Gavin McInnes and Shane Smith bought its predecessor, Voice of Montreal.

As of April 2017, the magazine's editor-in-chief was Ellis Jones. The magazine switched to a quarterly publication schedule in 2018, though issues still generally explored a single theme. The publication was put on hiatus in 2019 and relaunched five years later. Vice magazine includes the work of journalists, columnists, fiction writers, graphic artists and cartoonists, and photographers.

=== Vice News ===
Vice News was Vice's current affairs brand. It consisted of ViceNews.com, and two HBO programs; the weekly documentary series Vice, and the nightly news series Vice News Tonight. Vice News focuses on coverage of events that may not be as well covered by other news sources. On 24 May 2016, Vice Media promoted Josh Tyrangiel to oversee a unified Vice News division consisting of Vice News, the weekly HBO Vice show, and the daily Vice News Tonight.

Vice News creates content daily, distributing written articles and video on its website and YouTube channel. In 2015, the channel won two Peabody Awards for its video series The Islamic State and Last Chance High.

In 2013, HBO aired the first 10-episode season of a half-hour newsmagazine known as Vice, with Bill Maher as executive producer. The initial season saw international coverage for the season one finale that had Vice play an exhibition basketball game in North Korea with Dennis Rodman and the Harlem Globetrotters. The show was renewed for a second season, which aired in 2014 and won an Emmy award for Outstanding Informational Series or Special. The show was picked up for two more 14-episode seasons by HBO in May 2014, which aired in 2015 and 2016. The program is currently in its fifth season, which was expanded to a total of 30 episodes.

In October 2016, a second Vice News program, a nightly news program called Vice News Tonight, premiered. The program is slated to run 48 weeks each year, featuring pre-edited video and graphics segments covering global news, technology, the environment, economics and pop culture, while eschewing the use of live TV anchors.

Following the violent protests by white supremacists, white nationalists and other groups at the Unite the Right rally in Charlottesville, Virginia, Vice News Tonight broke from its normal newsmagazine format to devote an entire episode to a documentary film on the events. The episode aired the same weekend as the rally, 14 August 2017. Charlottesville: Race and Terror garnered critical praise, with Esquire urging readers to "watch it and share it". In addition to featuring the video on its subscription streaming channels, HBO agreed to post the entire video on YouTube. Within two weeks, it had more than 44 million views between HBO and online platforms and received many positive reviews. The episode received a Peabody Award for public service journalism in April 2018.

On April 27, 2023, it was first announced that Vice Media was restructuring and downsizing its news division due to budget problems. This action included the cancellation of Vice News Tonight and other programs and the layoffs of dozens of employees. In a tweet made by the Vice Union, they criticized the company for repeated layoffs and expressed disappointment over the loss of entire teams. They described the layoffs as part of a pattern where Vice has let go of many who have significantly contributed to the company's success. The Union also condemned the manner of the layoff announcements, which were made via a livestream without opportunity for dialogue and where the executives scarcely acknowledged the ongoing layoffs. The Vice Union has affirmed its support for the affected employees, implying a divergence from the company's past identity as a respected media organization.

=== Vice TV channel ===
Vice's U.S. cable television network, operated by Vice Media, primarily features documentary-style programs targeted toward millennials. Originally known as Viceland, branded TV networks operate under partnership with local cable and free-to-air television providers in the following regions:

Region	Partner
United States	A&E Networks
Australia	SBS
France	Canal+ Group
Netherlands	Ziggo
United Kingdom	Sky, Virgin Media (closed July 2020)
Serbia	Prva TV
Belgium	Proximus and Telenet
Spain and Portugal	AMC Networks International Iberia
New Zealand	Sky Television
Sub-Saharan Africa	Econet
Indonesia	Jawa Pos Group
Brazil	Grupo Globo
India	The Times Group
Israel	Partner TV

The channel is available through cable providers as well as OTT services.

Viceland was formerly available as a dedicated channel in Canada, through a partnership with Rogers Communications; however, this channel was shut down in March 2018 due to low viewership. In August 2018, Vice signed a new content deal with Bell Media to relaunch Vice-branded content in Canada on various Bell-owned properties including Much and CraveTV.

In August 2019, it was reported that Vice Media is moving Viceland toward news and away from entertainment and other lifestyle programming, and has plans to merge Viceland with Vice News.

Vice TV entered a partnership with the Professional Fighters League in November 2025 to broadcast ten international events from PFL MENA and PFL Africa in the United States through 2026. The agreement included two events in December 2025 and eight additional events during 2026.

=== UnTypical ===
Untypical, formerly Vice Studios, is the film and TV production division of Vice Media. Since 2007, it has released documentaries and narrative films through the Vice Films label. Its first theatrical release was White Lightnin' in 2009. On 8 December 2014, 20th Century Fox and Vice Media announced they would collaborate to finance, produce, distribute, market and acquire narrative films under the Vice Films brand.

List of productions
Year	Title	Notes	Type
2009	White Lightnin'	Produced with UK Film Council, Film and Music Entertainment, Mainframe Productions, The Salt Company International and distributed by Momentum Pictures	Documentary
2010	The Ride		Documentary
2012	Reincarnated	Produced with Snoopadelic Films	Documentary
2012	The Fourth Dimension		Fiction anthology film
2013	Lil Bub & Friendz		Documentary film
2014	Fishing Without Nets	Produced with Think Media Studios	Fiction film
2014	A Girl Walks Home Alone at Night	Only as distributor together with other studios	Fiction film
2015	Chemsex		Documentary film
2016	The Bad Batch	Produced with Annapurna Pictures and Human Stew Factory and distributed by Neon	Fiction film
2017	Jim & Andy: The Great Beyond – Featuring a Very Special, Contractually Obligated Mention of Tony Clifton	Distributed by Netflix	Documentary film
2019	Fyre	Produced with Jerry Media, Library Films and MATTE Projects Distributed by Netflix	Documentary film
2021	Flee	Distributed by Neon, Participant (United States), Curzon Artificial Eye (United Kingdom) and Haut et Court (France)	Animated documentary film

==== The Vice Guide to Everything ====
The MTV series The Vice Guide to Everything, which premiered in December 2010, was a weekly news magazine featuring short video segments on various global issues, hosted by Shane Smith and roster of correspondents. The segments sought to cater to a younger audience with a more condensed, entertaining approach to the news. The series aired until 2011.

=== Virtue Worldwide ===
On 26 January 2017, Vice announced the consolidation of its in-house agency Virtue with Carrot Creative, a digital and mobile agency Vice acquired in 2013, Pulse Films, a production company Vice acquired in 2016 into the new Virtue Worldwide. Based in Brooklyn, New York, the combined 450-person global consultancy provides the services of a full agency network and multi-platform content creation studio. Virtue Worldwide will be led by CEO Lars Hemming Jorgensen.

Relying on these in-house and acquired agencies, apart from its editorial operations, Vice works with advertisers to create global ad campaigns tailored to the company's younger audience. The ads generate revenue from the production of the ad and placement within a given media property. Vice maintains the separation between the production of branded and hard news content, while some critics contend that their operation "blurs the line between editorial and sponsorship". This practice is sometimes referred to as "native advertising", due to how ads are often mingled with regular content. Co-founder Alvi has also said that Vice has had "franchises that were underwritten by sponsors – that's our goal, to get a lot of our news franchises and stories and reports sponsored by advertisers. It's kind of the way news used to be in the fifties: 'Brought to you by Gillette' or whatever it was. We love that model."

Some of the brands that Vice has worked with are Google, Unilever, Bank of America, Samsung, Toyota, Levi Strauss & Co. and Intel. However, some advertisers have been controversial; Edition Worldwide, a subsidiary of Vice UK, was called "highly irresponsible" by the Campaign for Tobacco Free Kids and other anti-smoking groups for their work producing content for tobacco giant Philip Morris International. This was seen as unethical by anti-tobacco groups due to the young audience which Vice News usually attracts. In March 2019, Vice accepted £5M from Philip Morris to promote e-cigarettes to young people.

== Other business operations ==
Vice Media holds a range of online and offline properties. Digital channels include:

Name	Years	Genre
Vice magazine	1996-	Culture
Vice News	2013-	News
Noisey	2012	Music
Motherboard	2010	Technology and science

=== Former business operations ===
Name	Year	Genre	Notes
Broadly	2015–2019	Women's interest and LGBT community	
Munchies	2014–2022	Food and cooking	
Vice Sports	2014–2020	Sports	
i-D	2013–2023	Fashion	Sold to Karlie Kloss
VBS.tv	2007-2013		
Garage	2016–2021	Arts	
Amuse	2015–2020	Lifestyle	
Vice Impact	2017–2020	Advocacy	
Waypoint	2016–2023	Video games	
Tonic	2016–2018	Health and wellness	
Free	2018	Personal finance	
Refinery29	2019–2024	Culture	Sold to Sundial Media Group

- Launch refers to year where the first Vice-produced video was released on their respective YouTube channels.
- In 2014, Vice Media took over the YouTube-funded channel The NOC, which was launched in 2012.

=== Global expansion ===
Vice Media has steadily acquired media properties and firms and closed deals in order to expand its global operations.

In June 2014, it was reported that Time Warner was negotiating to acquire up to a 40% stake in Vice Media; among the company's plans were to give Vice Media control over the programming of HLN—a spin-off network of CNN which had recently struggled in its attempts to re-focus itself as a younger-skewing, social media-oriented news service. However, the deal fell through as the companies were unable to agree on a proper valuation, and Vice Media chose to partner with A&E Networks for a 10% minority stake. A&E's co-owner Disney made a second investment of $200 million.

On 30 October 2014, Vice Media announced a CDN$100 million joint venture with Rogers Communications that to facilitate the construction of production facilities in Toronto, as well as the introduction of a Vice-branded television network and digital properties in Canada in 2015. Rogers CEO Guy Laurence described the proposed studio as "a powerhouse for Canadian digital content focused on 18- to 34-year-olds" that will be "exciting" and "provocative". The content of the partnership will be aimed primarily toward digital platforms.

In November 2014, Vice Media announced that Alyssa Mastromonaco, who formerly worked in the Obama administration, would come on board as the company's chief operating officer in January 2015, and that James Schwab, who had previously advised Vice and DreamWorks on media deals, would be joining as co-president.

In June 2016, at the Cannes Lions Awards, the company announced its planned expansion into over 50 countries, including partnerships with The Times of India Group and Moby that will see Vice enter the India and Middle East markets with digital, mobile and linear operations. New Viceland channels have already launched in Southeast Asia, Australia, New Zealand, and Africa.

In late 2016, Vice announced a news and content expansion into the Indonesian market, with the goal of reaching the country's roughly 100 million young adults aged between 18 and 34 years. As of 7 November 2016, Vice had struck digital and cable programming deals with Google and Indonesian television network Jawa Pos TV to broadcast its original lifestyle, culture and news content.

On 1 March 2017 at Mobile World Congress, Vice announced new content deals with mobile operators in multiple regions, including an extensive Asia Pacific expansion and renewed partnership with Verizon's Go90 branch. The new deals will bring Vice's content into more than 80 global territories by the end of 2017.

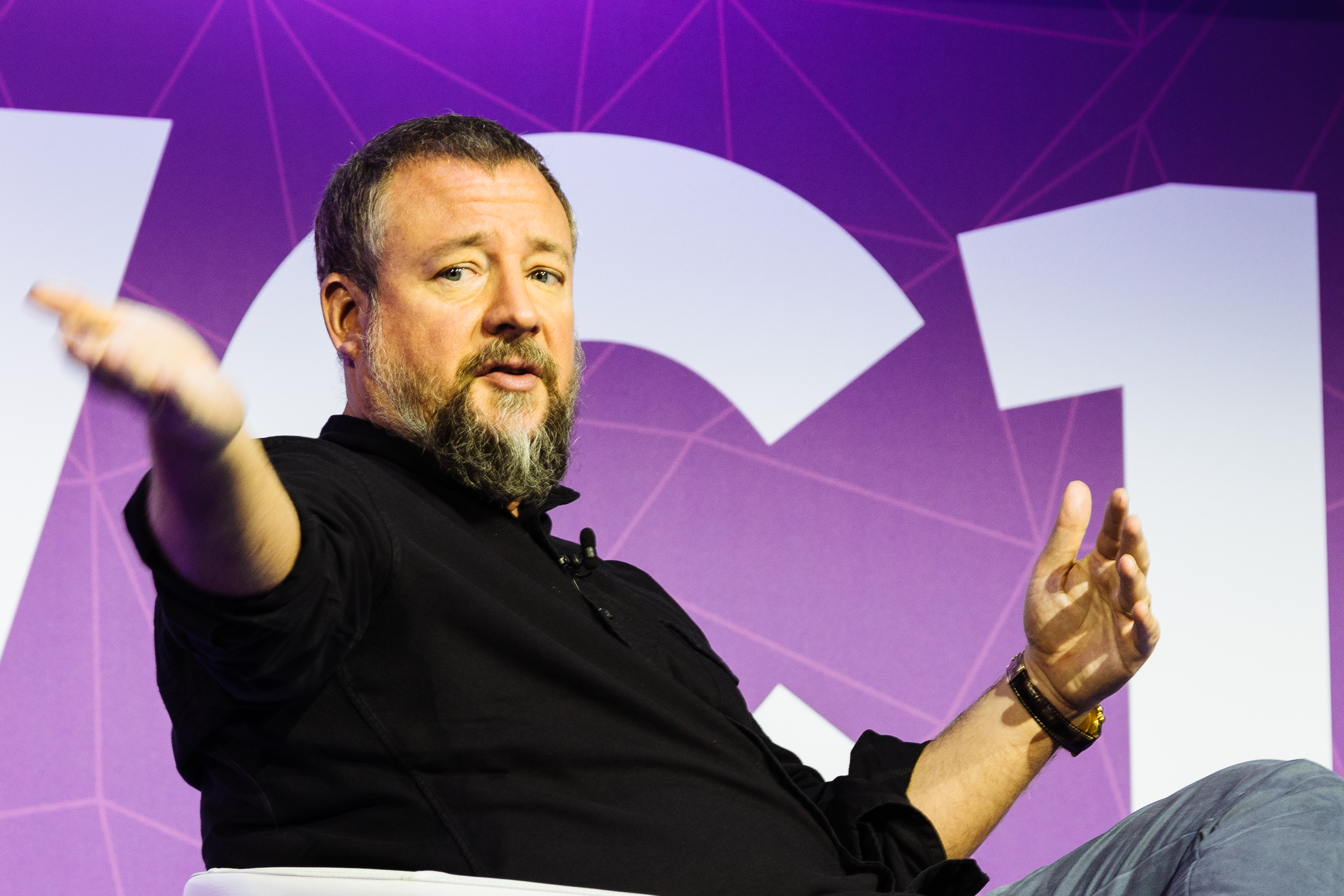
Shane Smith of Vice Media during Mobile World Congress 2017

On 22 March 2017, Vice Media finalized a deal with French digital media studio Blackpills for the creation of a line-up of original short-form programming, set to premiere on Vice's digital video hub, video.vice.com. Blackpills would enlist international filmmakers including Luc Besson, Bryan Singer, and Zoe Cassavetes in the creative effort. Vice London subsidiary Pulse Films contributed original content to air on video.vice.com, and Viceland in both the US and Canada aired Blackpills' first series, French/Canadian co-production You Got Trumped: The First 100 Days starring Donald Trump impersonator John Di Domenico and comedian Ron Sparks.

Later in March 2017, while in India, Shane Smith discussed his partnership with the Times Group. The company launched Vice India as well as their agency business, Virtue. Smith also revealed that the company had "held India back as a launch partner because it's so important to get it right. We didn't just want to come in, set up a studio and go. We wanted to have a plan, make sure we did it correctly." In June 2017, Vice announced a partnership with Brazilian media giant Grupo Globo that will see Vice grow its existing presence in the region through increased local production capabilities and increased mobile programming.

In November 2017, Vice announced the launch of a new Asia Pacific office with a dedicated CEO to oversee programming and business operations in India, Thailand, Malaysia, Indonesia and elsewhere in the region. The headquarters, in Singapore, will include "studio space that will be used for original documentary, drama, and film projects as well as by Vice's branding agency, Virtue."

In March 2021, the Pedestrian Group announced a multi-year deal to become the Australian digital publishing home of the brand. In January 2022, a new team of five, headed by Brad Esposito, was announced to head up Vice Australia and New Zealand. In July 2024, it was reported that Vice Australia would shut down amid a restructuring at Pedestrian.

In April 2025, Vice acquired Cuba Pictures, a drama producer based in the United Kingdom, from Curtis Brown.

=== Ventures, acquisitions, and mergers ===
==== Vice Music ====
Vice Records or Vice Music, launched in 2002, is Vice's in-house record label. It has released albums and singles by the following artists through various major label distributors:

- 120 Days
- Acrassicauda
- Action Bronson
- Almighty Defenders
- Black Lips
- Bloc Party
- Boredoms
- Charlotte Gainsbourg
- Chromeo
- Death From Above 1979
- Deniro Farrar
- Fucked Up
- Growing
- Head Wound City
- Justice
- King Khan and the Shrines
- Lullabye Arkestra
- Off!
- Rich Boy
- The Raveonettes
- The Stills
- The Streets
- Team Spirit
- Vybz Kartel

==== The Old Blue Last ====
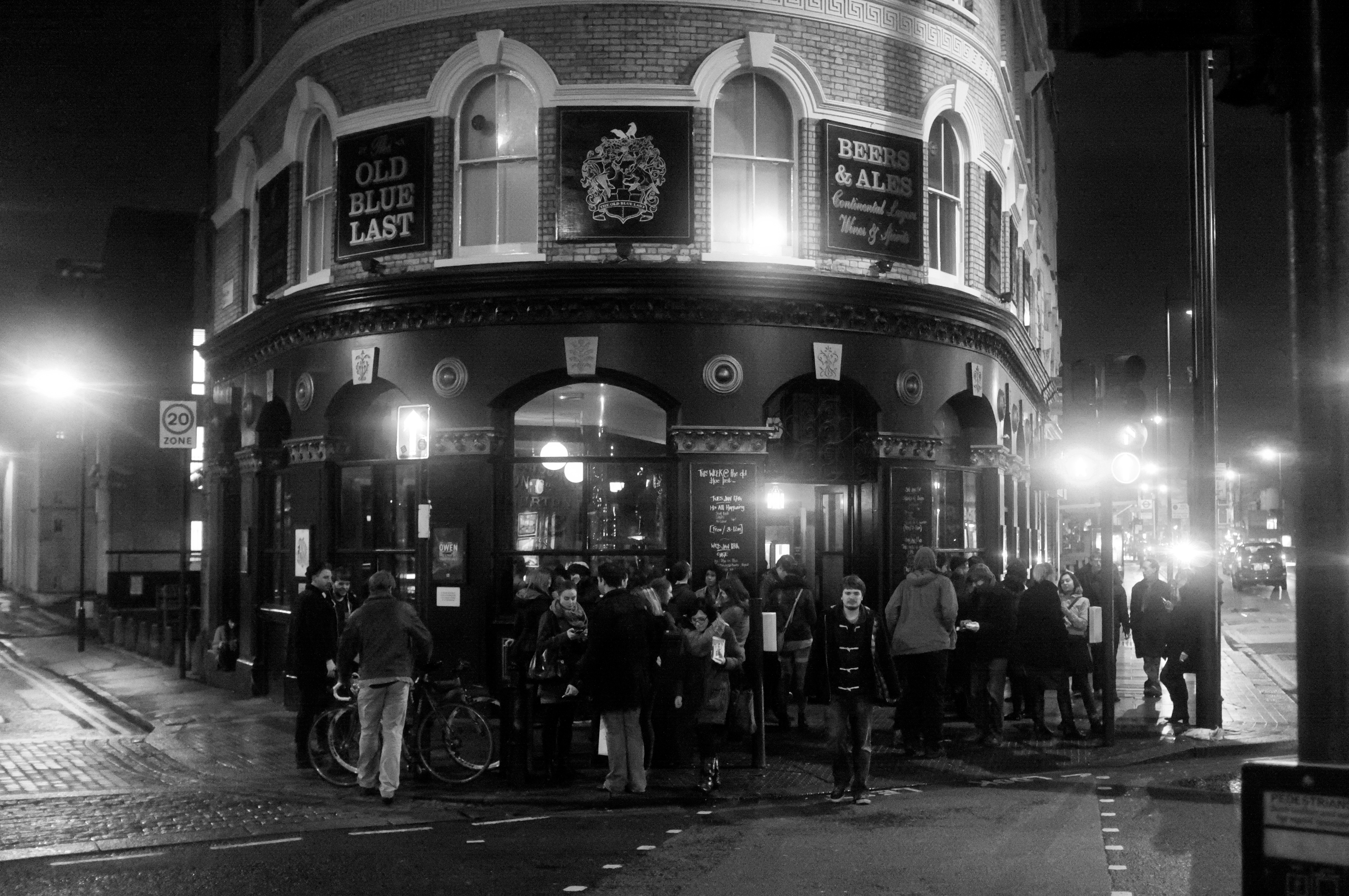
The Old Blue Last pub in 2012 Old Blue Last at Wikimedia Commons

In 2004 Vice acquired a pub and music venue in Shoreditch, East London named The Old Blue Last, in which a live music program entitled Live at the Old Blue Last is filmed. After Vice bought the Old Blue Last in 2004, it underwent a series of improvements, with most taking place in 2010. In 2012, Vice began selling beer under the Old Blue Last label.

==== i-D magazine ====
Vice acquired British fashion magazine i-D in December 2012, with Vice president Andrew Creighton calling it "one of the only fashion publications in the world we actually respect." Fashion model Karlie Kloss acquired i-D magazine from Vice in November 2023.

==== VRSE.farm ====
In 2015, Vice announced it invested an "undisclosed sum" in VRSE.farm, a virtual reality company founded by acclaimed director Chris Milk. The announcement came alongside a debut VR experience at the Sundance Festival, a "virtual-reality journalism broadcast" made in partnership with Spike Jonze and Vice News.

==== Pulse Films ====
Pulse Films was founded in 2005 by Thomas Benski and Marisa Clifford. It specializes in producing feature films, music documentaries and drama-documentaries.

In March 2016, Vice acquired a controlling stake in UK television and film production company Pulse Films, to bolster its original programming efforts. A year later Pulse Films produced original content for exclusive release on video.vice.com, Vice's digital video hub, including the series Pillowtalk,Twiz and Tuck Bucket List. The division had offices in Los Angeles, New York, Paris, Berlin and Milan as of 2022. Vice acquired commercial and music video production studio London Alley Entertainment in 2025 and merged it with Pulse Films to form Vice Commercials and Branded Entertainment.

==== Garage magazine ====
Vice acquired UK magazine Garage in July 2017 to expand its foothold in the youth market, and announced plans to launch a digital channel focused on art, fashion and literature.

==== Villain ====
In May 2018, Vice announced the acquisition of experiential events company Villain at its NewFronts presentation, but did not reveal what they paid for it. Villain is based in a 15,000 ft warehouse near Vice's headquarters in Williamsburg, NYC. The company works with a host of major brands, including PepsiCo, Toyota and Red Bull.

== Unionization ==
On 7 August 2015, the roughly 70-person writing staff of Vice Media US voted to unionize, joining the Writers Guild of America, East. Vice management quickly recognized the union. The successful union drive followed similar efforts at Salon, Gawker and The Guardian.

Then, in September 2017, employees and freelancers who "work on video content for Vice.com, cable channel Viceland, and Vice programming on HBO" unionized through Writers Guild of America, East and the Motion Pictures Editors Guild. At the time, a leader from one of the unions said: "We have built a constructive relationship with Vice management and applaud the company for continuing to respect the right of its employees to engage in collective bargaining."

On 2 May 2017, Vice Media ratified a three-year collective bargaining agreement with 170 employees of the company's Canadian division who had joined the Canadian Media Guild union in 2016.

In February 2016, staff members at Vice UK called for unionization with an officially recognised trade union by the National Union of Journalists (NUJ). Staff members said this was following the steps of Vice US (which unionized with the Writers Guild of America, East), in order to allow the staff to "share in the success of the company", to strengthen job security by Vice providing better contracts, to address "pay issues ... so everyone gets a fair deal, including freelancers" and enhance career progression opportunities.

This proposition was rejected by Vice UK; the company refused to recognise the NUJ, but instead said that they were free to set up an internal staff council. Vice chief executive, Matt Elek, claimed the NUJ had displayed "a concerning lack of transparency from them about who they are purporting to represent here [and had] not been able to provide us with any numbers to demonstrate the degree of support they have in this office", adding that: "The NUJ are used to working with old print media businesses and structures – they are not used to innovative, digital workplaces like this where the culture has always been to encourage flexibility and allow people work across different departments."

In response, Michelle Stanistreet (General Secretary of the NUJ) said: "The accusation that the NUJ has not been transparent in its discussions with Vice management is simply untrue" and characterized opposition as "union busting".

The NUJ submitted a new request for recognition in March 2019. Following talks at Acas, the company agreed to recognise the NUJ for purposes of collective bargaining on 25 July 2019.

== Office expansion in Brooklyn ==
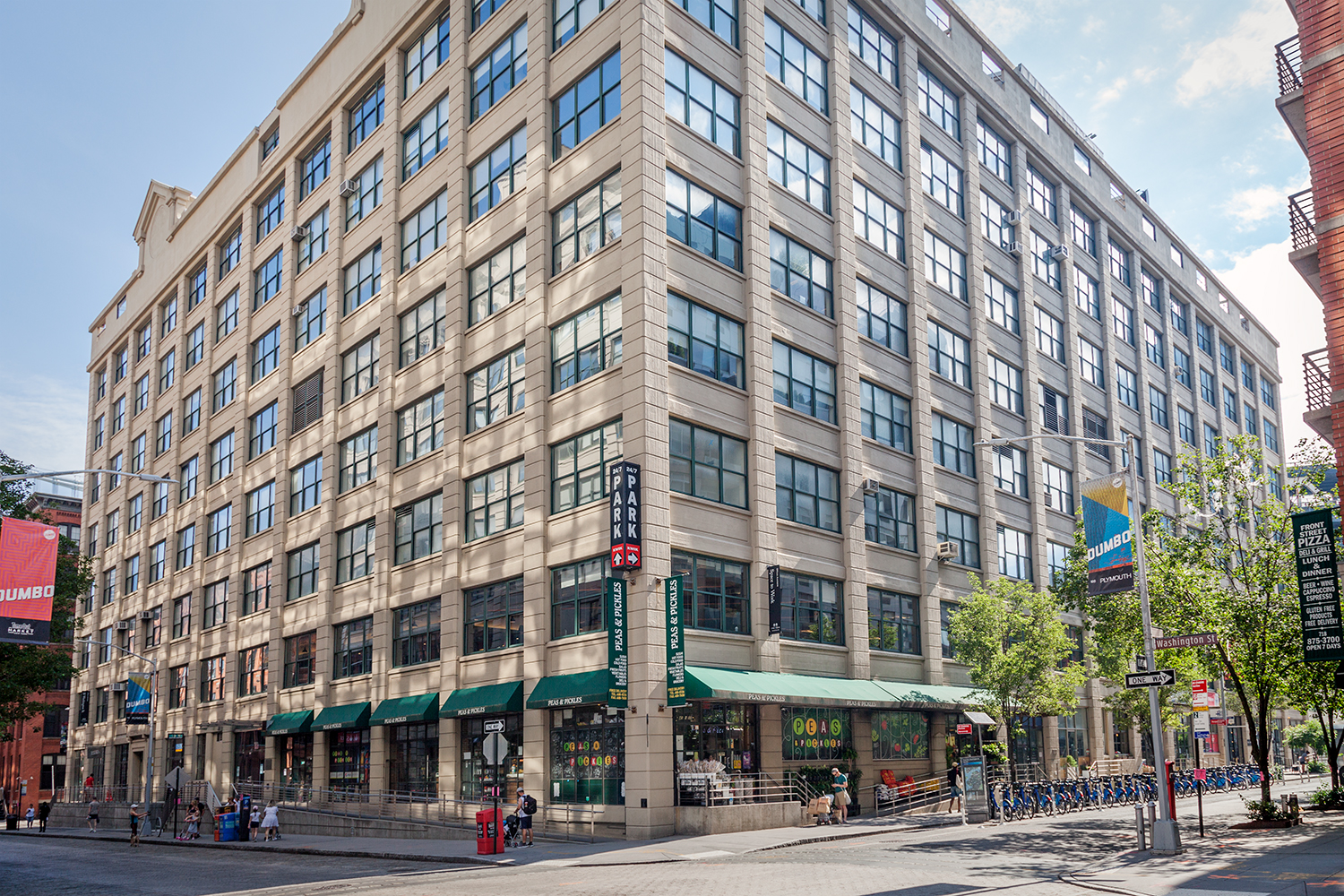
Vice Media expanded its offices to 55 Washington Street in Dumbo, Brooklyn

In July 2014, Vice Media announced it would be moving its headquarters to a new building in Williamsburg, Brooklyn, where their New York office had been since 1999. According to an article in The Wall Street Journal, the move would allow them to double their current office size and hire about 500 new employees.

Following this announcement, the two music venues occupying the building, Glasslands Gallery and Death By Audio, soon announced the news they would be closing. Following the announcement from Glasslands management in October 2014 that the arts venue would close at the end of 2014, thereby making it the third Williamsburg music space to close through Vice Media's expansion—alongside 285 Kent and Death By Audio—Big Shot Magazine claimed that the Brooklyn music community had received a "proverbial kick in the groin".

After a series of articles covering the venues' eviction, BrooklynVegan reported on the deals that led to Vice Media moving into the new office, including terms buying out tenants and covering past overdue rent, that contradicted some press around the renovation of the building and Vice Media's dealings with the current tenants. Regardless, as the article puts it, "The concept of 'Vice vs. DIY' in Williamsburg is officially a thing."

After expanding into the Glasslands Gallery and Death by Audio space in 2014, Vice further expanded its Brooklyn footprint by leasing a 74,000 square foot property at 55 Washington Street. The new property houses agency acquisitions Carrot Creative along with other Vice corporate staff.

== See also ==
- BuzzFeed, Inc.
- Mashable
- Mic (media company)
- TMZ
