= Vice (magazine) =

Magazine focused on international arts and culture

- The Syria Issue (November 2012)
- Editor-in-chief: Kevin Lee Kharas
- Categories: Lifestyle
- Frequency: Quarterly
- Circulation: 900,000 (worldwide); 80,000 (UK)
- Publisher: Vice Media
- Founder: Gavin McInnes; Shane Smith; Suroosh Alvi
- Founded: Montreal, Canada
- First issue: October 1994; 32 years ago (as Voice of Montreal)
- Based in: London, United Kingdom
- Website: vice.com
- ISSN: 1077-6788
- OCLC: 30856250

Vice is a Canadian-American-British magazine focused on lifestyle, arts, culture, and news/politics. It was founded in 1994 in Montreal as an alternative punk magazine, and its founders later launched the youth media company Vice Media, which consists of divisions including the printed magazine as well as a website, broadcast news unit, a film production company, a record label, and a publishing imprint. As of September 2024, the magazine's editor-in-chief is Kevin Lee Kharas.

On 15 May 2023, Vice Media formally filed for Chapter 11 bankruptcy, as part of a possible sale to a consortium of lenders including Fortress Investment Group, which will, alongside Soros Fund Management and Monroe Capital, invest $225 million as a credit bid for nearly all of its assets. In February 2024, CEO Bruce Dixon announced additional layoffs and that the website Vice.com will no longer publish content. The print magazine returned in September 2024.

== History ==
The precursor to Vice magazine was founded in October 1994 in Montreal under the name Voice (later Voice of Montreal), by Interimages Communications. It was a spin-off of the English-language portion of Images magazine, a multicultural publication founded in the early 1990s by Dominique Ollivier with Alix Laurent, under the name Voice of Montreal. Issue no. 1 lists Laurent and Ollivier as publishers, with Suroosh Y. Alvi as editor and Gavin McInnes as assistant editor, with Shane Smith joining the magazine's staff later. The magazine was established under a job creation program of the Quebec government to allow social welfare recipients to gain work experience. It focused on Montreal's alternative cultural scene, including music, art, trends and drug culture, to compete with the already established Montreal Mirror. During the 1990s, Montreal's Plateau Mont-Royal/Mile-End neighbourhood was home to a burgeoning subculture with the advent of collectives such as Godspeed You! Black Emperor, Dummies Theatre, Bran Van 3000 and later Arcade Fire. Alvi, McInnes and Smith bought out the publisher and changed the magazine's name to Vice in 1996.

Richard Szalwinski, a Canadian software millionaire, acquired the magazine and relocated the operation to New York City in 1999. Following the relocation, the magazine quickly developed a reputation for provocative and politically incorrect content. Under Szalwinski's ownership, a few retail stores were opened in New York City and customers could purchase fashion items that were advertised in the magazine. However, due to the end of the dot-com bubble, the three founders eventually regained ownership of the Vice brand, followed by closure of the stores.

The British edition of Vice was launched in 2002 and Andy Capper was its first editor. Capper explained in an interview shortly after the UK debut that the publication's remit was to cover "the things we're meant to be ashamed of", and articles were published on topics such as bukkake and bodily functions.

By the end of 2007, 13 foreign editions of Vice magazine were published, the Vice independent record label was functional, and the online video channel VBS.com had 184,000 unique viewers from the U.S. during the month of August. The media company was still based in New York City, but the magazine began featuring articles on topics that were considered more serious, such as armed conflict in Iraq, than previous content. Alvi explained to The New York Times in November 2007: "The world is much bigger than the Lower East Side and the East Village."

McInnes left the publication in 2008, citing "creative differences" as the primary issue. In an email communication dated 23 January, McInnes explained: "I no longer have anything to do with Vice or VBS or DOs & DON'Ts or any of that. It's a long story but we've all agreed to leave it at 'creative differences,' so please don't ask me about it."

At the commencement of 2012, an article in Forbes magazine referred to the Vice company as "Vice Media", but the precise time when this title development occurred is not public knowledge. Vice acquired the fashion magazine i-D in December 2012 and, by February 2013, Vice produced 24 global editions of the magazine, with a global circulation of 1,147,000 (100,000 in the UK). By this stage, Alex Miller had replaced Capper as the editor-in-chief of the UK edition. Furthermore, Vice consisted of 800 worldwide employees, including 100 in London, and around 3,500 freelancers also produced content for the company.

In February 2015, Vice Media named Ellis Jones editor-in-chief of Vice magazine and former UK editor-in-chief, Alex Miller, was appointed to the position of global head of content.

In 2018, the magazine switched to a quarterly publication schedule, though issues still generally explored a single theme. The publication was put on hiatus in 2019.

In 2023, Vice filed for Chapter 11 bankruptcy. The company's lenders—Fortress Investment Group, Soros Fund Management and Monroe Capital—agreed to purchase the company for $225 million. In February 2024, The New York Times highlighted that "over the past half-decade, Vice has had near annual layoffs and mounting losses, and has filed for bankruptcy, making it the poster child for the battered digital-media industry" and that while "some observers hoped its new owners [...] would reinvest" in the company, Fortress Investment Group had instead "decided to make sweeping cuts".

In September 2024, Vice Media relaunched its print magazine and would publish issues quarterly. The company has a goal of reaching 20,000 subscribers within a year.

== Staff ==
- Shane Smith – co-founder
- Suroosh Alvi – co-founder
- Kevin Lee Kharas – editor-in-chief
- Ben Ditto – Global Editorial Director

== Content ==
=== Scope ===
Vice magazine includes the work of journalists, columnists, fiction writers, graphic artists and cartoonists, and photographers. Both Vice's online and magazine content has shifted from dealing mostly with independent arts and pop cultural matters to covering more serious news topics. Due to the large array of contributors and the fact that often writers will only submit a small number of articles with the publication, Vice's content varies dramatically and its political and cultural stance is often unclear or contradictory. Articles on the site feature a range of subjects, often things not covered by mainstream media. The magazine's editors have championed the immersionist school of journalism, which has been passed to other properties of Vice Media such as the documentary television show Balls Deep on the Viceland Channel. This style of journalism is regarded as something of a DIY antithesis to the methods practiced by mainstream news outlets, and has published an entire issue of articles written in accordance with this ethos. Entire issues of the magazine have also been dedicated to the concerns of Iraqi people, Native Americans, Russian people, people with mental disorders, and people with mental disabilities. Vice also publishes an annual guide for students in the United Kingdom.

In 2007, a Vice announcement was published on the Internet:

After umpteen years of putting out what amounted to a reference book every month, we started to get bored with it. Besides, too many other magazines have ripped it and started doing their own lame take on themes. So we're going to do some issues, starting now, that have whatever we feel like putting in them.

=== Politics ===
In a March 2008 interview with The Guardian, Smith was asked about the magazine's political allegiances and he stated, "We're not trying to say anything politically in a paradigmatic left/right way… We don't do that because we don't believe in either side. Are my politics Democrat or Republican? I think both are horrific. And it doesn't matter anyway. Money runs America; money runs everywhere."

=== Website ===
Vice.com
- Owner: Vice Media
- Website: vice.com
- Launched: 2011
- Current status: Active

Vice founded its website as Viceland.com in 1996, as Vice.com was already owned. In 2007, it started VBS.tv as a domain, which prioritized videos over print, and had a number of shows for free such as The Vice Guide to Travel. In 2011, Viceland.com and VBS.tv were combined into Vice.com, also the host of the Vice Motherboard website at motherboard.vice.com.

In 2012, Vice Media was created as the parent company for Vice magazine and other properties including Vice News on HBO and the Vice.com website. The company has since expanded and diversified to include a network of online channels, including Munchies.tv, Motherboard.tv, Noisey.com, Thu.mp, and Broadly.

On 22 February 2024, Vice Media CEO Bruce Dixon announced "several hundred" additional layoffs as the company restructures, and that the website Vice.com would no longer publish content. Some of its journalists have since spun off, such as 404 Media being a spiritual successor of the tech division Motherboard founded by its key people.

=== Book ===
- In 2007, Vice published The Vice Photo Book (ISBN 1576874109), with a collection of photos of Jaimie Warren, Jerry Hsu, Michael Rababy and Patrick O’Dell. The book is divided in five parts: "Vice Photographers", "Vice's Photojournalism", "Vice Fashion", and the final two sections are a collage of previously published VICE photos. The book also contains interviews with some of the photographers.
- Jill Abramson: Merchants of Truth: The Business of News and the Fight for Facts. Simon & Schuster, New York 2019, (ISBN 978-1-5011-2320-7), S. 42–61, 147–181, 346–369 (= Chapter 2, 6 and 11).

== Reputation ==
From its beginnings as Voice of Montreal, Vice had a "reputation for provocation". In 2010, Vice was described as "gonzo journalism for the YouTube generation". As the magazine grew into a broader media brand, it struggled with "how to distance itself from its crude past, yet hold on to enough of that reputation to cement, and grow, its authority with its core audience". Nevertheless, the magazine has continued to face controversy. In 2013, the magazine retracted parts of a fashion spread entitled 'Last Words' which depicted "female writers killing themselves". Also in 2013, Vice again gained unwelcome attention when the then-editor of the magazine joined millionaire software mogul John McAfee as he evaded authorities to avoid being questioned about a murder case.

=== Sexual harassment at parent company ===
In late 2017, multiple stories were published citing allegations of sexual misconduct and a general "boys club" culture at Vice magazine's parent company, Vice Media.

== Awards ==
- Wins
  - ASME Reader's Choice Best Cover Contest for "Best Travel and Adventure" for June 2017 issue
  - ASME Reader's Choice Best Cover Contest for "Most Delicious" for March 2016 issue
  - ASME Anthology of Best American Magazine Writing for "Fixing the System" interview, 2016
  - ASME Reader's Choice Award for New and Politics Cover, 2015
  - ASME Reader's Choice Award for Business and Tech Cover, 2015
  - Ranked number 9 on Ad Age Magazine A-list (first free publication to be recognized), 2010
- Nominations
  - GLAAD Media Award, Outstanding Magazine Article for "On the Run", 2017
  - ASME Single Topic Issue for the Prison Issue, 2016
  - ASME Feature Photography for "Deep-Fried America on a Stick", 2014
  - ASME General Excellence for July, November and December issues, 2012

== See also ==
- Creative nonfiction
- The Sacrament, a 2013 film about fictional Vice journalists
- URBANIA, Canadian media created in 2000
