= Shane Smith (journalist) =

Canadian media executive (born 1969)

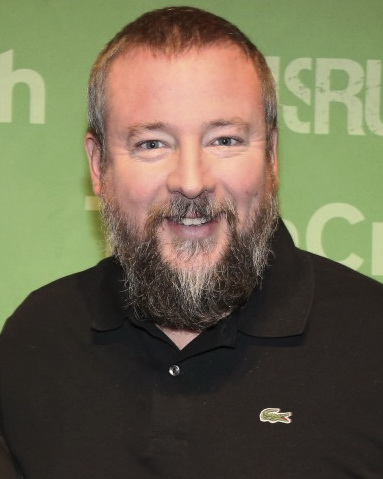
- Smith in 2014
- Born: 28 September 1969 (age 56); Ottawa, Ontario, Canada
- Education: Lisgar Collegiate Institute; Carleton University
- Occupations: Entrepreneur, media executive, journalist
- Known for: Vice Media co-founder
- Spouse: Tamyka (2009-2021)
- Children: 3

Shane Smith (born 28 September 1969) is a Canadian journalist and media executive. He is executive chairman of the international media company Vice Media, operating an international network of digital channels, a television production studio, a record label, an in-house creative services agency, a book-publishing house, and a feature film division.

Smith was the CEO of Vice from its founding until March 2018.

== Early life and education ==
Shane Smith was born in Ottawa, Ontario, on 28 September 1969. His parents were Irish immigrants; his father was a computer programmer, and his mother a paralegal. He attended the Lisgar Collegiate Institute and later graduated from Carleton University with a degree in English literature and political science.

Before Vice, Smith played in local punk bands, spent a brief time working in a bar in Dublin, and travelled around Eastern Europe before moving to Montreal.

== Career ==
=== Beginning at Voice, rebrand as VICE and Szalwinski years ===
Smith joined Montreal's Voice magazine (later Voice of Montreal) in 1994, where his childhood friend Gavin McInnes already worked as assistant editor under Suroosh Alvi. The counterculture magazine was subsidized by a Quebec government program assisting welfare recipients in developing workplace skills. The three men renamed the magazine Vice when they bought it from its publisher in 1996.

Richard Szalwinski, a Canadian software millionaire, acquired the magazine and relocated the operation to New York City in the late 1990s. Following the relocation, the magazine quickly developed a reputation for provocative and politically incorrect content. Under Szalwinski's ownership, a few retail stores were opened in New York City and customers could purchase fashion items that were advertised in the magazine. However, due to the end of the dot-com bubble, the three founders eventually regained ownership of the Vice brand, followed by closure of the stores.

=== Expansion of VICE, video content, brand deals ===
Initially publishing print articles based on offbeat alternative culture, VICE moved to creating news content and social criticism on multiple media platforms in 2006. Smith remains an owner of the company, and The New York Times has described Smith as "a cross between a punk rocker and Fortune 500 Executive". As a journalist Smith has travelled to locations including North Korea, Iran, Afghanistan, Libya, Kashmir, Liberia, Sudan, and Greenland, initially for the 2006 online TV series VICE Guide to Travel. Smith has continued as a correspondent for VICE, appearing in online content as well as the host of VICE's HBO show and VICE Special Reports.

In 2006, on the advice from the company's creative director Spike Jonze, VICE Media began expanding into digital video. This led to a massive expansion of VICE into new channels, including a partnership with Intel in 2010 for The Creators Project, as well as deals with partners like Viacom, YouTube, and HBO, led by Smith.

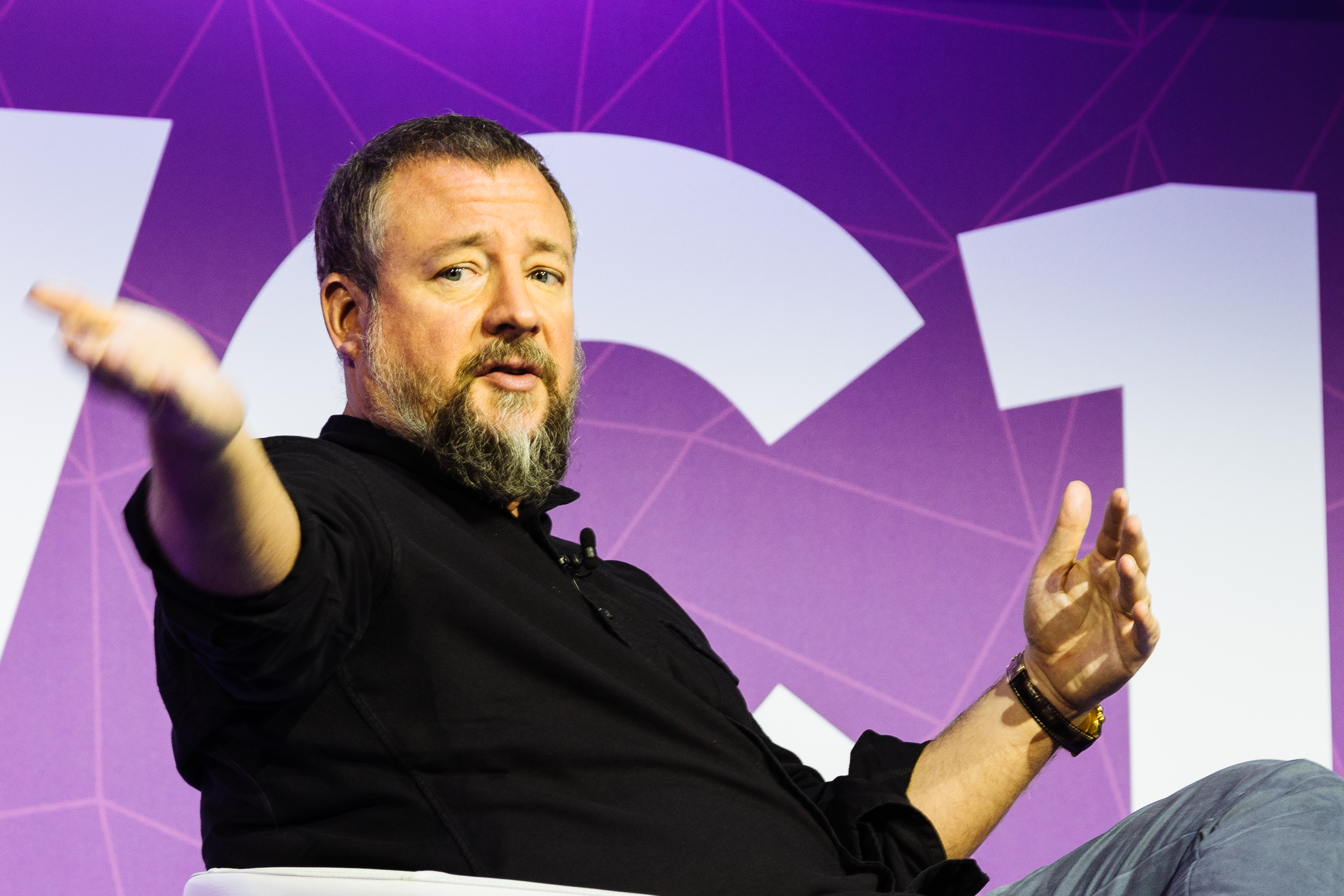
Shane Smith of Vice Media during Mobile World Congress 2017

In April 2013, VICE started a new series with HBO, "VICE", in which Smith and other VICE correspondents cover news stories from around the globe. The show's second season won an Emmy for Outstanding Informational Series or Special. The show was picked up for two more 14-episode seasons by HBO in May 2014, which aired in 2015 and 2016. Based on the success of the weekly show, in 2015 HBO and VICE announced an expanded deal including a daily news show on HBO Now premiering in 2016, 32 VICE-produced specials over four years, and an expansion of the existing show from 14 to nearly 30 episodes per year. "VICE" started its 5th season of weekly broadcasts on HBO under the expanded episode deal on Friday, 24 February 2017.

In June 2014, it was reported that Time Warner was negotiating to acquire a minority stake in VICE Media; among the company's plans were to give Vice Media control over the programming of HLN—a spin-off network of CNN which had recently struggled in its attempts to re-focus itself as a younger-skewing, social media-oriented news service. However, the deal fell through as the companies were unable to agree on a proper valuation, and VICE Media partnered with A&E Networks for a 10% minority stake in VICE Media for $250 million, keeping VICE Media independent. The following April, it was announced that A&E's channel H2 would be rebranded as VICELAND, a lifestyle channel aimed at millennials. On 29 February 2016, VICE Media officially launched VICELAND with investment support by Disney and A&E. Disney has since increased their stake in VICE Media through A&E with two $200 million investments—the first in November 2015, followed by the second a week later in December 2015—for a roughly 10% stake to assist in funding programming and growth.

In 2015, VICE partnered with several companies, including Verizon, Rogers Communications, Live Nation, Spotify and Snapchat, where VICE was a launch partner for Snapchat's "Discover" platform.

=== VICE peak years ===
Smith, in interviews, has mentioned the possibility of VICE going public, saying in a 2015 interview: "There hasn't been a media company like this to go public in 15 years… the markets would love it", and he told CNBC in 2016 that "it's the best time in history to be a content creator."

In 2015, Smith accompanied US President Barack Obama as part of the president's first historic visit to a federal prison, interviewing Obama along with five non-violent drug offenders at El Reno Prison. He also conducted the first public interview with the Eagles of Death Metal following the 2015 terrorist shooting at their show at the Bataclan in Paris that left 89 dead.

In 2015, Canadian Business placed him on "Canada's Richest People", claiming his net worth to be at $1.27 billion.

On 9 December 2016, HBO broadcast "Vice Special Report: A House Divided", which explores the political dysfunction in the United States during the Obama presidency. The 75-minute program features Smith interviewing influential US politicians including President Obama, former Speaker of the House John Boehner and former House Majority Leader Eric Cantor to understand the development of excessive polarization and gridlock, culminating in the 2016 presidential election. It was nominated for an Emmy award.

On 22 June 2016, VICE Media unveiled a number of international deals that, by the end of 2017, would make its programs available in over 50 new territories, over 80 in total.

Smith stepped down as CEO of Vice Media in 2018, and was replaced by A+E Networks CEO Nancy Dubuc, while he took on the role Executive Chairman. After years of financial struggles and layoffs, Vice Media filed for bankruptcy and was sold in August 2023.

== Personal life ==
From 2016, Smith resided in Santa Monica, California, with his wife, Tamyka, and his three daughters.

In 2021, his wife Tamyka filed for divorce.

== Filmography ==
- 2019: The Report (executive producer)
- 2017: The Bad Batch (executive producer)
- 2016: "Vice Special Report: A House Divided" (host, executive producer)
- 2016: Vice Guide to Film (executive producer)
- 2016: Terror (executive producer)
- 2016: Abandoned (executive producer)
- 2016: Cyberwar (executive producer)
- 2016: Dead Set on Life (executive producer)
- 2015: "Contamination Nation" (executive producer)
- 2015: "The Gangs of El Salvador" (executive producer)
- 2014: Shot: The Mick Rock Documentary (executive producer)
- 2014: Fishing Without Nets (executive producer)
- 2013–present: VICE News (TV Series documentary) (executive producer)
- 2013–present: VICE (writer, correspondent, executive producer)
- 2011: The VICE Guide To Everything (correspondent, executive producer)
- 2009: White Lightnin' (screenplay)
- 2007: Heavy Metal In Baghdad (executive producer)
- 2006: VICE Guide to Travel (writer, correspondent, executive producer, director, creator)

== Awards ==
Smith's work on VICE's HBO show won him an Emmy award in 2014, as well as a number of environmental awards for his work covering global warming in Greenland, Antarctica and beyond. He has also been honoured with a Frank Stanton Award for Excellence in Communication, an LA Press Club Award, and two Peabody awards for serving as executive producer of VICE News' documentaries "The Islamic State" and "Last Chance High".

- 2016: Cannes Lions Media Person of the Year
- 2015: Peabody Award - VICE News segment, "The Islamic State"
- 2015: Peabody Award - VICE News segment, "Last Chance High"
- 2015: Environmental Media Association Award for Best Reality Television Program - VICE on HBO, "Our Rising Oceans"
- 2015: Advertising Age Creativity 50 All Stars
- 2015: Frank Stanton Award for Excellence in Communication
- 2015: Los Angeles Press Club Public Service Award In Journalism
- 2014: Emmy Award for Outstanding Informational Series or Special - VICE on HBO
- 2014: VICE Media ranked Fast Company's Number 3 Most Innovative Media Company
- 2014: Environmental Media Association Award Nomination for Best Reality Television Program - VICE on HBO, "Greenland is Melting"
- 2014: Brand Genius Award
- 2014: Knight Innovation Award
- 2013: VICE Media named Ad Age's Publishing Company of the Year
- 2010: VICE Magazine named to Ad Age Magazine A-List (first free publication to be recognized)
