= Desus & Mero =

Desus & Mero is a TV presenting duo, Desus Nice and The Kid Mero and may refer to:

- Desus vs. Mero, former American podcast and web series
- Desus & Mero (2016 TV series), a former American television and web late-night talk show on Viceland
- Desus & Mero (2019 TV series), a former American television late-night talk show on Showtime
