= List of pop culture podcasts =

This is a list of podcasts that discuss popular culture. Pop culture podcasts often discuss entertainment news and celebrity gossip.

== Podcasts ==
Podcast	Country	Year	Host(s)	Produced by	Ref
Comments by Celebs		2018–present	Emma Diamond and Julie Kramer	Cadence13	
Pop My Culture		2010–present	Cole Stratton and Vanessa Ragland		
Shameless		2018–present	Zara McDonald and Michelle Andrews	Shameless Media	
Pop Culture Happy Hour		2021-present	Aisha Harris, Linda Holmes, Stephen Thompson, and Glen Weldon	NPR	
Psychobabble with Tyler Oakley and Korey Kuhl			Tyler Oakley and Korey Kuhl		
Doug Loves Movies			Doug Benson		
Pop History Podcast	USA	2017–present	Jay Jackson		
Kar Dishin' It: All Things Kardashian		2017- present	Jessica Jean Jardine and Marcy Jarreau		
Still Processing		2016–present	Jenna Wortham and Wesley Morris	The New York Times	
The Read		2013–present	Kid Fury and Crissle West	Loud Speakers Network	
Slate's Culture Gabfest		2008–present	Stephen Metcalf, Dana Stevens, and Julia Turner	Slate	
Thirst Aid Kit		2017–2020	Bim Adewunmi and Nichole Perkins	BuzzFeed, (2017–2019), Slate (2019–2020)	
Who? Weekly		2016–present	Bobby Finger and Lindsey Weber	Independent	
Just the Sip			Justin Sylvester		
Dlisted		2018	Michael Kuroiwa and site Allison Davey		
Daily Pop				E! News	
Nightly Pop				E! News	
NerdCast	Brazil	2006–present	Alexandre Ottoni and Deive Pazos	Jovem Nerd	
Não Ouvo	Brazil	2015–present	Maurício Cid	Não Salvo	
Um Milkshake Chamado Wanda	Brazil	2015–present	Phelipe Cruz & Samir Duarte	PapelPop	
Na Palma da Mari	Brazil	2020–present	Mari Palma	CNN Brasil	
Made Possible by Pop Culture	USA	2024-present	Danielle Turchiano	Danielle Turchiano	
Giggly Squad		2020-present	Hannah Berner and Paige DeSorbo		
The Social	Canada	2013-present		Bell Media	
