= The Read with Kid Fury and Crissle West =

- Genre: talk show, variety show
- Presented by: Kid Fury and Crissle West
- Theme music composer: Leikeli47
- Country of origin: United States
- Original language: English
- No. of seasons: 1
- No. of episodes: 10

Production
- Executive producers: Kid Fury; Crissle West; Chloe Pisello; Jonathan Martin; Richard Allen-Turner; Jon Thoday
- Producer: Avalon Television
- Running time: 30 minutes

Original release
- Network: Fuse
- Release: October 11 – December 20, 2019

Related
- The Read

The Read with Kid Fury and Crissle West is an American variety and talk show. It is a television adaptation of the pop culture podcast The Read and stars the podcast's hosts, Kid Fury and Crissle West. The series premiered on October 11, 2019 on Fuse.

== Production ==
On March 13, 2019, it was announced that the podcast The Read would be adapted into a television show. The television show was one of several pilots released by Fuse from 2019 to 2020 that targeted diverse, millennial, and Generation Z audiences.

The producers included Chloe Pisello, Jonathan Martin, Richard Allen-Turner, and Jon Thoday. Kid Fury and Crissle West served as the show's hosts and executive producers.

The show has a 30-minute run-time, and features two segments that appear on the podcast, The Read and Hot Tops. Special guests appeared on several episodes.

On August 14, 2019, it was announced that the show would premiere on October 11, 2019. The first season had ten episodes.

== Broadcast ==
The series premiered in the United States on Fuse on October 11, 2019. It appeared weekly for 30 minutes and also streamed on iTunes and Amazon Prime.

== Episodes ==
Ep#	Title	Airdate	Guest(s)
1	"They Done Gave Us A TV Show"	October 11, 2019	Desus & Mero
2	"The Vest Guest"	October 18, 2019	DeRay Mckesson
3	"Young R.E.A.D."	October 25, 2019	Young M.A.
4	"Missy: The Icon"	November 1, 2019	Missy Elliott
5	"Famous Ramos"	November 8, 2019	Anthony Ramos
6	"Unsolved Heterosexual Mysteries"	November 15, 2019	--
7	"Leaning on Lena"	November 22, 2019	Lena Waithe
8	"Dade County Debauchery with Ts Madison"	December 6, 2019	Ts Madison
9	"Rae in LA"	December 13, 2019	Issa Rae
10	"Checking for Chika"	December 20, 2019	Chika
