= Desus & Mero (2016 TV series) =

American television late-night talk show

- Genre: Late-night talk show
- Starring: Desus Nice; The Kid Mero
- Country of origin: United States
- Original language: English
- No. of seasons: 2
- No. of episodes: 309

Production
- Executive producer: Erik Rydholm
- Running time: 30 minutes

Original release
- Network: Viceland
- Release: October 17, 2016 – June 28, 2018

Related
- Desus & Mero (2019); Desus vs. Mero

Desus & Mero is an American television late-night talk show hosted by Desus Nice and The Kid Mero that ran from October 17, 2016, to June 28, 2018, on Viceland. In 2018, the show's hosts left Viceland and moved to Showtime and the new Desus & Mero premiered on February 21, 2019.

This is the second series co-hosted by Desus and Mero, following the 2014 Complex TV web series Desus vs. Mero.

== Episodes ==
=== Season 1 ===
Ep#	Airdate	Guest(s)	Notes
Pilot	October 14, 2016	Cord Jefferson	Test episode
1	October 17, 2016	Awkwafina	
2	October 18, 2016	Taxstone	
3	October 19, 2016	Vashtie Kola	
4	October 20, 2016	Charlamagne tha God	
5	October 24, 2016	Pia Glenn	
6	October 25, 2016	The Fat Jew	
7	October 26, 2016	Ezra Koenig	
8	October 27, 2016	Danielle Gibson	
9	October 31, 2016	Jillionaire	
10	November 1, 2016		
11	November 2, 2016	Rembert Browne	
12	November 3, 2016	Mary H.K. Choi	
13	November 7, 2016	Alyssa Mastromonaco	
14	November 8, 2016	Talib Kweli, Krishna Andavolu, Cardi B & Jim Jones	Live Election Special
15	November 9, 2016	DeRay Mckesson	
16	November 10, 2016		
17	November 14, 2016	Bomani Jones	
18	November 15, 2016	Nick Catchdubs	
19	November 16, 2016	Janice Griffith	
20	November 17, 2016	Cord Jefferson	
21	November 21, 2016	Sam Sifton	
22	November 22, 2016	Rashida Jones	
23	November 23, 2016	KFC Barstool	
24	November 24, 2016		Thanksgiving Best Of Special
25	November 28, 2016	Tony Peralta	
26	November 29, 2016	Michael Arceneaux	
27	November 30, 2016	Chris Hayes	
28	December 1, 2016	Amina Blue	
29	December 5, 2016	Jamilah Lemieux	
30	December 6, 2016	The Loopy Blogger	
31	December 7, 2016	The Lox	
32	December 8, 2016	Pablo Torre	
–	December 11, 2016		Miami Special
33	December 12, 2016	Immortal Technique	
34	December 13, 2016	Nick Cannon	
35	December 14, 2016	Willie Geist	
36	December 15, 2016	Franchesca Ramsey	
37	December 19, 2016	Katie Nolan	
38	December 20, 2016	John Hodgman	
39	December 21, 2016	Angie Martinez	
40	December 22, 2016		SantaCon Special
41	January 9, 2017	Abdullah Saeed	
42	January 10, 2017	Josh Brown	
43	January 11, 2017	Wesley Morris	
44	January 12, 2017	Jenna Wortham	
45	January 16, 2017	Jean Grae	
46	January 17, 2017	Neal Brennan	
47	January 18, 2017	Melissa Harris-Perry	
48	January 19, 2017	Amanda Nunes / Jamali Maddix	
49	January 23, 2017	Heben Nigatu & Tracy Clayton	
50	January 24, 2017	Soledad O’Brien	
51	January 25, 2017	Joe Budden	
52	January 26, 2017	Stevie J	
53	January 30, 2017	CC Sabathia	
54	January 31, 2017	Jamal Joseph	
55	February 1, 2017	Anil Dash	
56	February 2, 2017	Jemele Hill	
57	February 6, 2017	Fat Joe	
58	February 7, 2017	Nigel Sylvester	
59	February 8, 2017	Nessa	
60	February 9, 2017		
61	February 13, 2017	Yandy Smith-Harris	
62	February 14, 2017	Mr. Vegas	
63	February 15, 2017	Rachel Maddow	
64	February 16, 2017	Dave East	
65	February 27, 2017	Johnetta Elzie	
66	February 28, 2017	Damien Lemon	
67	March 1, 2017	Don Q	
68	March 2, 2017	Flatbush Zombies	
69	March 6, 2017	Eddie Huang	
70	March 7, 2017	Ebro	
71	March 8, 2017	Crissle West	
72	March 9, 2017	Joey Badass	
73	March 13, 2017	Faith Evans	
74	March 14, 2017	Michael Arceneaux	
75	March 15, 2017	Jared Odrick	
76	March 16, 2017	Jesse Williams	
77	March 20, 2017	Chris Hayes	
78	March 21, 2017	Sal Masekela	
79	March 22, 2017	Young M.A	
80	March 23, 2017	Michael Skolnik	
81	March 27, 2017	Mike Will Made It	
82	March 28, 2017	Run the Jewels	
83	March 29, 2017	Arian Foster	
84	March 30, 2017	Juelz Santana	
85	April 3, 2017		
86	April 4, 2017	Hari Kondabolu	
87	April 5, 2017	Angela Rye	
88	April 6, 2017	Mack Wilds	
89	April 17, 2017	Jerrod Carmichael	West Coast Special
90	April 18, 2017	Anthony Anderson	West Coast Special
91	April 19, 2017	Aubrey Plaza	West Coast Special
92	April 20, 2017	Shane Smith	West Coast Special
93	April 24, 2017	A$AP Ferg	
94	April 25, 2017	Jay Williams	
95	April 26, 2017	Rick Ross	
96	April 27, 2017	Chad Johnson	
97	May 1, 2017	Neil deGrasse Tyson	
98	May 2, 2017	Kenny Lucas & Keith Lucas	
99	May 3, 2017	Paul Scheer	
100	May 4, 2017	Tom Colicchio	100th Episode Special
101	May 8, 2017	Krishna Andavolu	
102	May 9, 2017	Shad Moss	
103	May 10, 2017	Timothy Simons	
104	May 11, 2017	Cipha Sounds	
105	May 15, 2017	Al Sharpton	
106	May 16, 2017	Cari Champion	
107	May 17, 2017	Whoopi Goldberg	
108	May 18, 2017	Melissa Harris-Perry	
109	May 22, 2017	Enes Kanter	
110	May 23, 2017	Hannibal Buress	
111	May 24, 2017	Rob Huebel	
112	May 25, 2017	Larry Wilmore	
113	June 5, 2017	Malcolm Gladwell	
114	June 6, 2017	Joy Reid	
115	June 7, 2017	Sasheer Zamata	
116	June 8, 2017	Ron Funches	
117	June 12, 2017	Freddie Gibbs	
118	June 13, 2017	Big Boi	
119	June 14, 2017	Lizzo	
120	June 15, 2017	French Montana	
121	June 19, 2017	Baron Ambrosia	
122	June 20, 2017	Casanova 2X	
123	June 21, 2017	James Davis	
124	June 22, 2017	Matt Walsh	
125	June 26, 2017	Bert Kreischer	
126	June 27, 2017	Janet Mock	
127	June 28, 2017	Von Miller	
128	June 29, 2017	Diddy	
129	July 17, 2017	Malcolm Jenkins	
130	July 18, 2017	Issa Rae	
131	July 19, 2017	Action Bronson	
132	July 20, 2017	Matteo Lane	
133	July 24, 2017	A-Trak	
134	July 25, 2017	Spike Jonze	
135	July 26, 2017	Vic Mensa	
136	July 27, 2017	Jessica Williams	
137	July 31, 2017	Irv Gotti	
138	August 1, 2017	DeRay Mckesson	
139	August 2, 2017	Liza Treyger	
140	August 3, 2017	Jay Ellis	
141	August 7, 2017	Jon Jones / James Van Der Beek	
142	August 8, 2017	Yvonne Orji	
143	August 9, 2017	DJ Clue	
144	August 10, 2017	Max Kellerman	
145	August 14, 2017	Joe Mande	
146	August 15, 2017	Seth Meyers	
147	August 16, 2017	Adriano Espaillat	
148	August 17, 2017	Angela Rye	
149	August 21, 2017	Rachel Nichols	
150	August 22, 2017	Zane Lowe	
151	August 23, 2017	Russell Peters	
152	August 24, 2017	Esperanza Spalding	
153	August 28, 2017	Rashad Jennings	
154	August 29, 2017	Bam Margera	
155	August 30, 2017	Aminé	
156	August 31, 2017	Jermaine Fowler	
157	September 11, 2017	Danny McBride & Walton Goggins	
158	September 12, 2017	Jerry Ferrara	
159	September 13, 2017	Iman Shumpert	
160	September 14, 2017	ASAP Twelvyy	
161	September 18, 2017	Joy Bryant	
162	September 19, 2017	Andra Day	
163	September 20, 2017	Adrian Grenier	
164	September 21, 2017	Victor Oladipo	
165	September 25, 2017	Arian Foster	
166	September 26, 2017	Bill Simmons	
167	September 27, 2017	Craig Robinson	
168	September 28, 2017	G-Eazy	
169	October 2, 2017	Terry Crews	
170	October 3, 2017	Dame Lillard	
171	October 4, 2017	Jamilah Lemieux	
172	October 5, 2017	Method Man	

=== Season 2 ===
Ep#	Airdate	Guest(s)	Notes
1	October 16, 2017	Kenya Barris	
2	October 17, 2017	A Boogie wit da Hoodie	
3	October 18, 2017	Michael Stahl-David	
4	October 19, 2017	Charlamagne tha God	
5	October 23, 2017	J.B. Smoove	
6	October 24, 2017	Al Harrington	
7	October 25, 2017	Talib Kweli	
8	October 26, 2017	Iman Shumpert / Ty Dolla $ign	
9	October 30, 2017	Rosie Perez	
10	October 31, 2017	DeRay Davis	
11	November 1, 2017	Frankie J & Baby Bash	
12	November 2, 2017	Gabrielle Union	
13	November 6, 2017	Fabolous	
14	November 7, 2017	Jeff Ross	
15	November 8, 2017	Amanda Seales	
16	November 9, 2017	Steve Stoute	
17	November 13, 2017	T-Pain	
18	November 14, 2017	Jay Pharoah	
19	November 15, 2017	Gary Owen	
20	November 16, 2017	Erykah Badu	
21	November 20, 2017	John Geiger	
22	November 21, 2017	Diplo	
23	November 22, 2017	Daniel Caesar	
24	November 23, 2017		Thanksgiving Special: The Ball Baggys
25	November 27, 2017	Black Thought	
26	November 28, 2017	Wyclef Jean	
27	November 29, 2017	Matty Matheson	
28	November 30, 2017	Nikole Hannah-Jones	
29	December 4, 2017	Ester Dean	
30	December 6, 2017	Big K.R.I.T.	
31	December 7, 2017	Carl Lentz	
32	December 12, 2017	Seth Rogen	
33	December 13, 2017	Andy Cohen	
34	December 14, 2017	DRAM	
35	December 18, 2017	Jeezy	
36	December 19, 2017	Jason Sudeikis	
37	December 20, 2017	Bomani Jones	
38	December 21, 2017	Baron Davis	
39	January 2, 2018	Hari Kondabolu	
40	January 3, 2018	Katie Nolan	
41	January 4, 2018	Angie Martinez	
42	January 8, 2018	Pete Holmes	
43	January 9, 2018	Jason Mitchell	
44	January 10, 2018	Lena Waithe	
45	January 11, 2018	Jesse Boykins III	
46	January 15, 2018	Amar'e Stoudemire	
47	January 16, 2018	Rob Riggle	
48	January 17, 2018	CC Sabathia	
49	January 18, 2018	Luis Guzmán	
50	January 22, 2018	Fetty Wap	
51	January 23, 2018	Jason Jones	
52	January 24, 2018	Andre Harrell	
53	January 25, 2018	Tee Grizzley	
54	January 29, 2018	Spike Lee	
55	January 30, 2018	Deon Cole	
56	January 31, 2018	Darrelle Revis	
57	February 1, 2018	Victor Cruz	
58	February 5, 2018	Karley Sciortino	
59	February 6, 2018	Soledad O'Brien	
60	February 7, 2018	Amara La Negra	
61	February 8, 2018	Whitney Cummings	
62	February 12, 2018	Lewis Black	
63	February 13, 2018	DJ Premier & Royce da 5'9"	
64	February 14, 2018	Michael B. Jordan	
65	February 15, 2018	Chadwick Boseman	
66	February 19, 2018	Phoebe Robinson	
67	February 20, 2018	Luis Fonsi	
68	February 21, 2018	Ali Siddiq	
69	February 22, 2018	Jesse Williams / Kirsten Gillibrand	
70	February 26, 2018	Nipsey Hussle	
71	February 27, 2018	Ari Melber	
72	February 28, 2018	David Arquette	
73	March 1, 2018	Maverick Carter	
74	March 12, 2018	Jimmy O. Yang	
75	March 13, 2018	Jimmy Fallon	
76	March 14, 2018	Louie Anderson	
77	March 15, 2018	Jamali Maddix	
78	March 19, 2018	Kid Fury	
79	March 20, 2018	John Boyega	
80	March 21, 2018	Bill Hader	
81	March 22, 2018	Jussie Smollett	
82	March 26, 2018	Michael Imperioli	
83	March 27, 2018	Mary H.K. Choi	
84	March 28, 2018	Tom Segura	
85	March 29, 2018	Eric Holder	
86	April 2, 2018	John Cena	
87	April 3, 2018	Nicky Jam	
88	April 4, 2018	Rob Haze	
89	April 5, 2018	Jean Grae & Quelle Chris	
90	April 9, 2018	Matthew Rhys	
91	April 10, 2018	Deontay Wilder	
92	April 11, 2018	Tinashe	
93	April 12, 2018	Jamie Hector	
94	April 16, 2018	A$AP Rocky	
95	April 17, 2018	Seth Rogen	
96	April 18, 2018	Paula Patton	
97	April 19, 2018	Tracy Morgan	
98	April 23, 2018	Martellus Bennett	
99	April 24, 2018	Adrian Foster	
100	April 25, 2018	Lil Yachty	
101	April 26, 2018	Penn Jillette	
102	April 30, 2018	Rae Sremmurd	
103	May 1, 2018	Andre Drummond	
104	May 2, 2018	Alexis Ohanian	
105	May 3, 2018	Tracee Ellis Ross	
106	May 7, 2018	Bill Nye the Science Guy	
107	May 8, 2018	Nessa	
108	May 9, 2018	Melissa McCarthy	
109	May 10, 2018	Karrueche Tran	
110	May 14, 2018	Cedric the Entertainer	
111	May 15, 2018	Travis Kelce	
112	May 16, 2018	Kyle O'Quinn	
113	May 17, 2018	Terry Crews	
114	May 21, 2018	Nikki Glaser	
115	May 22, 2018	Pod Save America	
116	May 23, 2018	Anderson .Paak	
117	May 24, 2018	Lee "Scratch" Perry	
118	June 4, 2018	J. Prince	
119	June 5, 2018	Rubén Díaz Jr.	
120	June 6, 2018	Director X	
121	June 7, 2018	Jim Jones	
122	June 11, 2018	Roxane Gay	
123	June 12, 2018	Taye Diggs	
124	June 13, 2018	Marlon Wayans	
125	June 14, 2018	Ray Liotta	
126	June 18, 2018	Hannibal Buress	
127	June 19, 2018	Rich Paul	
128	June 20, 2018	Wiz Khalifa	
129	June 21, 2018	Malcolm Jenkins	
130	June 25, 2018	Estelle	
131	June 26, 2018	Michael Arceneaux	
132	June 27, 2018	La La	
133	June 28, 2018	Vashtie Kola, Charlamagne tha God & Pioladitingancia / Mike Francesa	Series Finale Special
