= Taxstone =

American media personality

- Born: Daryl Campbell; August 14, 1985 (age 41); Brooklyn, New York, U.S.
- Notable work: Tax Season, Uncommon Sense, VLAD TV, The Brilliant Idiots

Comedy career
- Years active: 2006–2017
- Medium: Media personality
- Genre: Hip-hop

Daryl Campbell (born August 14, 1985), known professionally as Taxstone, is an American television and Twitter personality. He is primarily known for his Tax Season podcast on the Loud Speakers Network, as well as his Twitter presence. Campbell was a member of the Bloods gang, but later distanced himself from any involvement.

== Career ==
Taxstone was born as Daryl Campbell in East New York, Brooklyn, and he is of Afro-Honduran ancestry. He rose to prominence through Twitter, where he grew a large following for his bluntness and brazenness.

He caught the attention of The Loud Speakers Network's podcast hosts and on January 8, 2015, he appeared on an episode of Charlamagne tha God and Andrew Schulz's The Brilliant Idiots podcast. Another podcast host on the network, Kid Fury, had also recommended him to the network's bosses Combat Jack and Chris Morrow which led him to land his own podcast Tax Season. He released the first episode of Tax Season on The Loud Speakers Network on March 18, 2015, just four months after he was first recommended to the network by Kid Fury.

== Arrest ==
On 16 January 2017, Campbell was arrested in connection to the shooting death of Ronald "Banga" McPhatter. McPhatter was working at the time as the bodyguard for rapper Troy Ave at an Irving Plaza concert for fellow rapper T.I. Campbell was indicted on charges of being a felon in possession of a firearm and receiving a gun through interstate commerce. Authorities allege that Campbell's DNA was found on the trigger, hand grip and magazine of the 9-millimeter Kel-Tec semiautomatic handgun that was used in the shooting in the venue's green room.

Campbell was convicted Thursday March 22, 2023 on manslaughter, assault and weapon possession charges for the May 2016 shooting that left 33 year old Ronald “Banga” McPhatter dead. He was sentenced to 35 years.
