= Daryl Campbell =

Daryl Campbell may refer to:

- Daryl Campbell, known professionally as Taxstone, American television and Twitter personality
- Daryl Campbell (politician), member of the Florida House of Representatives

== See also ==
- Darrell Campbell, American football player
