= The Brilliant Idiots =

Pop culture and comedy podcast

- Genre: Comedy, social commentary
- Format: Popular culture podcast
- Language: English

Cast and voices
- Hosted by: Charlamagne Tha God, Andrew Schulz

Production
- Length: 60 - 180 minutes

Publication
- No. of episodes: 300+
- Original release: April 2014

Related
- Website: thebrilliantidiots.squarespace.com

The Brilliant Idiots is a weekly podcast based in New York City offered by the Loud Speakers Network on iTunes, SoundCloud and streaming service iHeart Radio. featuring media personality Charlamagne Tha God and comedian Andrew Schulz.

== History ==
The first episode was released in April 2014. The podcast was first developed through Charlamagne tha God and Schulz working together on MTV2's Guy Code. It was created as a way for the two to express comedic uncensored opinions and views that they usually cannot express working for Viacom and iHeart Radio, respectively.

== Format ==
The show features Schulz and Charlamagne discussing current events, including entertainment news, race relations in America, sex, relationships, and politics. The show is filmed in a studio by AlexxMedia and clips are uploaded to YouTube. They sometimes have a segment called "Ask An Idiot" where they answer questions provided by listeners through email. This has now mostly been left to live shows only. They were previously joined in the studio by Charlamagne's best friend and bodyguard Wax, who was a fan favorite, however, he has not made an appearance since 2021.

=== Race ===
One of the recurring topics of the podcast deals with the ideas of white privilege in race relations in America, with the two hosts discussing and analyzing it with many guests.

== Live shows ==
The show has gone around the world performing live shows from New York City to London, England where they interact with fans, and have the "Ask An Idiot" segment.

== Guests ==
The show has had a wide range of guests including Daymond John, Claudia Jordan, Tahiry Jose, Melyssa Ford, fellow Guy Code co-stars Timothy DeLaGhetto, Lil Duval, and SNL cast member, Pete Davidson along with others.
