= Crissle West =

American writer and comedian

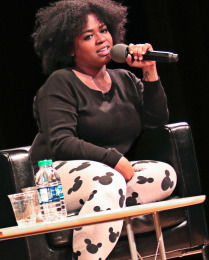
- West at a live taping of The Read
- Born: September 16, 1982 (age 44)
- Occupations: Comedian, social commentator, writer
- Years active: 2012–present
- Known for: The Read, Drunk History

Crissle West (born September 16, 1982) is an American writer and comedian. She is best known as the co-host of the pop culture podcast The Read. She has starred in episodes of Drunk History, on which she has told the story of Harriet Tubman's work as a Union spy during the Civil War, as well as Marsha P. Johnson and the Stonewall riot.

== Career ==
In Oklahoma, she met future The Read co-host Kid Fury first on Twitter, then in person during a trip to Atlanta in 2012. West moved to New York City shortly thereafter and worked first at a magazine, and then as an executive assistant.

=== The Read ===
Two months after West moved to New York, Kid Fury approached her about starting a podcast through the Loud Speakers Network; the show, named The Read, quickly gained traction. iTunes featured The Read on its Best of 2013 list and as an Editors' Choice pick in 2014. Slate named one episode to its list of "Best 25 Podcast Episodes of All Time," and The Verge named The Read to its list of podcasts "you should be listening to." The Read also won Best Podcast at the 2014 Black Weblog Awards.

Together West and Kid Fury were named to The Grio's 100, which said "the unabashedly profane duo take 'throwing shade' to a new level on a weekly basis leaving their fans in stitches and shaking their heads in disbelief."

The Read was adapted into a television show on Fuse TV that premiered in October 2019.

=== Comedy and other media ===
West has been noted for her trenchant critiques of racism. In 2015 she drew national attention for a WNYC-hosted panel "Funny or Racist" where she dismantled an argument defending blackface.

West is also a comedian, notably appearing with Octavia Spencer on Comedy Central's Drunk History series in "a surprisingly-hilarious retelling" of Harriet Tubman's work as a Union spy during the Civil War. Salon called the episode one of 2015's "best moments in political comedy." In 2016, West narrated an episode of Drunk History honoring National Coming Out Day, recounting Sylvia Rivera and Marsha P. Johnson's role in the Stonewall Riots. The A.V. Club said the episode "schools Hollywood in telling LGBT stories," as "West, who was one of last season's best narrators, returns with another memorable, powerful retelling."

West was also a host on Beats 1 Radio, part of Apple Music, and has written for Essence. Madame Noire calls her "one of the people we wish were our friends. She's just that cool, really."

West appeared on the second season of late-night show Uncommon Sense with Charlamagne Tha God on MTV2.

Alongside Francheska Medina, West co-hosted InsecuriTEA: The Insecure Aftershow, the official recap podcast for the HBO series Insecure. The fourth season was nominated for a Shorty Social Good Award in the Podcast category at the 13th Shorty Awards. The fifth season won the People's Voice award at the Webby Awards.

== Personal life ==
West is queer. As of 2023 she is enrolled in a master's degree program in Clinical Mental Health Counseling.

== Filmography ==
Year	Title	Role	Notes
2014	Watch What Happens Live	Herself	Season 11, Episode 89
2015–2018	Drunk History	Herself	3 episodes
2016	Uncommon Sense with Charlamagne	Herself	Regular panelist
2017	Andy Cohen's Then & Now	Herself	
2019	The Read with Kid Fury and Crissle West	Herself	Co-host and executive producer

== Accolades ==
Year	Award	Category	Nominee(s)	Result	Ref.
2014	Black Weblog Awards	Best Podcast	The Read	Won	
2018	BET Social Awards	Best Podcast	The Read	Nominated	
2019	iHeartRadio Podcast Awards	Best Multi-Cultural Podcast	The Read	Nominated	
2020	iHeartRadio Podcast Awards	Best Podcast of the Year	The Read	Nominated	
2020	iHeartRadio Podcast Awards	Best Comedy Podcast	The Read	Nominated	
2020	Shorty Awards	Best Podcasters	Kid Fury and Crissle	Nominated	
2021	iHeartRadio Podcast Awards	Best Comedy Podcast	The Read	Won	
2021	iHeartRadio Podcast Awards	Best Pop Culture Podcast	The Read	Nominated	
2022	Queerty Awards	Best Podcast	The Read	Nominated	
2023	NAACP Image Awards	Outstanding Arts and Entertainment Podcast	The Read	Nominated	
2023	Webby Awards	Podcasts, Entertainment (Limited-Series & Specials) (People's Voice)	Insecure S5 – InsecuriTEA Podcast	Won	
2023	Webby Awards	Podcasts, Television & Film	Insecure S5 – InsecuriTEA Podcast	Won	
2024	AAMBC Literary Awards	Podcast of the Year	The Read	Nominated	
2026	GLAAD Media Award	Outstanding Podcast	The Read	Nominated	
