= Desus vs. Mero =

American comedy podcast

''Desus vs. Mero

Presentation
- Hosted by: Desus Nice; The Kid Mero
- Genre: Comedy, entertainment, talk
- Language: English

Production
- Camera: Paul–Perez Gallan
- Production: Donnie Kwak; Keith Cecere; Rebecca Niles; Matt Maltese
- Opening theme: Desus vs. Mero theme, produced by The Letter "C" and DJ Treats
- No. of episodes: 46

Publication
- Original release: 18 December 2013 – 31 December 2014
- Provider: Complex TV

Desus vs. Mero was a weekly podcast show and web series hosted by Bronx natives Desus Nice and The Kid Mero. The podcast was first released on 18 December 2013 and after 46 episodes it ended on 31 December 2014. The duo has since gone on to appear on TV series such as MTV2's Guy Code, Uncommon Sense, Joking Off, and hosted Desus & Mero (2016)' on Viceland and Desus & Mero (2019) on Showtime.

== Episodes ==
Season 1
Ep#	Theme	Airdate (iTunes)	Airdate (YouTube)	Guests
1	THE WORLD PREMIERE	18 December 2013	28 February 2014	
2	Gotta Hear Both Sides	24 December 2013	28 February 2014	
3	The Caucacity of Cheese	9 January 2014	28 February 2014	
4	I No Black, Papi	15 January 2014	28 February 2014	
5	Bumbaclot Feud-icles	24 January 2014	28 February 2014	
6	Dyckman Chinchillas	30 January 2014	28 February 2014	
7	Box-getting in the Snow	6 February 2014	28 February 2014	
8	OCHO NO CINCO	13 February 2014	28 February 2014	
9	Vegan Quarter Waters	8 April 2014	7 April 2014	
10	Bold Braids Bloooood	15 April 2014	12 April 2014	
11	Money House Blessing	22 April 2014	18 April 2014	
12	Wake Up Never	29 April 2014	25 April 2014	
13	Gratata-touille	6 May 2014	2 May 2014	
14	Baby Mom's Brolic	13 May 2014	9 May 2014	
15	Dust Dreams	20 May 2014	16 May 2014	
16	The French Montana Riviera	27 May 2014	23 May 2014	
17	Accidental Deathing	3 June 2014	30 May 2014	
18	Mulatto Divorce Swag	10 June 2014	6 June 2014	
19	Krang Related	17 June 2014	13 June 2014	
20	Marlon Wayans Is Here	24 June 2014	20 June 2014	Marlon Wayans
21	Everything is #SUS	1 July 2014	27 June 2014	
22	NWB	7 July 2014	7 July 2014	
23	The Lost Darts	15 July 2014	11 July 2014	
24	The Bodega Mermaid	22 July 2014	18 July 2014	
25	Tu Tienes Que Comer Culo	28 July 2014	25 July 2014	
26	NO LIMBS, NO L'S	5 August 2014	1 August 2014	
27	EBOLLIN!	12 August 2014	8 August 2014	
28	Double D vs. Mero	18 August 2014	15 August 2014	Dillon Francis
29	#DvMChallenge	25 August 2014	22 August 2014	Estelle
30	The Washed Episode	30 August 2014	29 August 2014	
31	FAP RADAR	9 September 2014	5 September 2014	
32	Finessing the Plug	15 September 2014	12 September 2014	Olivia Longott
33	Pumpkin Spice TerRio	22 September 2014	19 September 2014	Lil Terrio
34	Pastrami on Deck	30 September 2014	26 September 2014	Damien Lemon
35	The Rinse Cycle	7 October 2014	3 October 2014	
36	Just Boof It	15 October 2014	10 October 2014	The Fat Jew
37	Melancholy Flows	21 October 2014	20 October 2014	Hannibal Buress
38	Papi Smear	27 October 2014	24 October 2014	
39	GET YOUR BLACKFACE ON	3 November 2014	31 October 2014	
40	Struggle Bus	11 November 2014	7 November 2014	
41	Do Your Googles	17 November 2014	14 November 2014	PeejeT
42	NOW THEY GOT TIME, CUZZ	1 December 2014	28 November 2014	
43	Shump Wit Da Pump	9 December 2014	5 December 2014	Iman Shumpert
44	Don Lemon Party	15 December 2014	12 December 2014	
45	Shea Butter Music	22 December 2014	19 December 2014	
46	The DVM-ies	6 January 2015	31 December 2014	
