= Guy Court =

- Genre: Comedy; Court show
- Country of origin: United States
- Original language: English
- No. of seasons: 1
- No. of episodes: 12

Production
- Executive producers: Andrew Stuckey; Darin Byrne; Paul Ricci; Ryan Ling
- Running time: 22 minutes

Original release
- Network: MTV2
- Release: November 6 – December 18, 2013

Related
- Guy Code

Guy Court is an American comedy court show television series and the third spin-off to Guy Code. The series premiered on November 6, 2013, and aired on MTV2. Guy Court handles a variety of cases where the "guy code" was violated. Donnell Rawlings serves as the "judge" with Melanie Iglesias as the "bailiff". Various cast members from Guy Code serve as lawyers.

== Cast ==
- Donnell Rawlings
- Melanie Iglesias
- Andrew Schulz
- Anthony "Chico" Bean
- Charlamagne Tha God
- Chris Distefano
- Dan Soder
- Damien Lemon
- Jon Gabrus
- Jermaine Fowler
- Jordan Carlos

== Episodes ==
No.	Title	Original release date
1	"Mr. D-Pic"	November 6, 2013
2	"Facebook Breakup and Striptease"	November 6, 2013
3	"Letting It Rip and Beer Bandit"	November 13, 2013
4	"Booty Thirst, Cry Me a River, and Killin' em Softly"	November 13, 2013
5	"Party Prankster and Fruity Drinks"	November 20, 2013
6	"Grenade Launcher and Calling Dibs"	November 20, 2013
7	"Mr. Porno and Blabbermouth"	November 27, 2013
8	"Gym Selfies, Mr. Mani Pedi, and Madden Madness"	November 27, 2013
9	"Cell Phone Snooper, Double Ply Dandy, Birthday Block"	December 4, 2013
10	"Ridin Dirty and Social Media Whore"	December 11, 2013
11	"Perpetual proposer, Tanning, Game Changer"	December 18, 2013
12	"Birthday Blues and Facebook Stalker"	December 18, 2013
