= Dan Soder =

American comedian (born 1983)

- Soder in 2026
- Born: Daniel Edward Richard Soder; June 24, 1983 (age 43); Hartford, Connecticut, U.S.
- Partner: Katie Nolan (2020–present)

Comedy career
- Medium: Stand-up, podcast, radio, television
- Genres: Observational comedy, blue comedy, crude humor, off-color humor, insult comedy, impersonations, sarcasm
- Subjects: Everyday life, pop culture, human behavior, self-deprecation, sex, recreational drug use, celebrities, current events
- Website: dansoder.com

Daniel Edward-Richard Soder (born June 24, 1983) is an American stand-up comedian, actor, podcaster and former radio personality. He initially rose to prominence for playing the character Mafee on the Showtime drama series Billions, then later as the former co-host of The Bonfire with fellow comedian Big Jay Oakerson on SiriusXM from 2015 to 2023. Soder is also known for his frequent appearances on Guy Code.

== Early life ==
Daniel E. Soder was born in Hartford, Connecticut, on June 24, 1983. He is of Irish and Swedish descent. He was raised in Aurora, Colorado. While Soder was in high school, his father died after a long illness; two years later, his sister died in a car crash. He became close friends with future Miami Dolphins head coach and Los Angeles Chargers offensive coordinator Mike McDaniel while the two were growing up. He attended Smoky Hill High School. He began performing stand-up comedy while a student at the University of Arizona, graduating in 2005 with degrees in journalism and political science. A year later, he moved to New York City to further pursue his career.

== Career ==
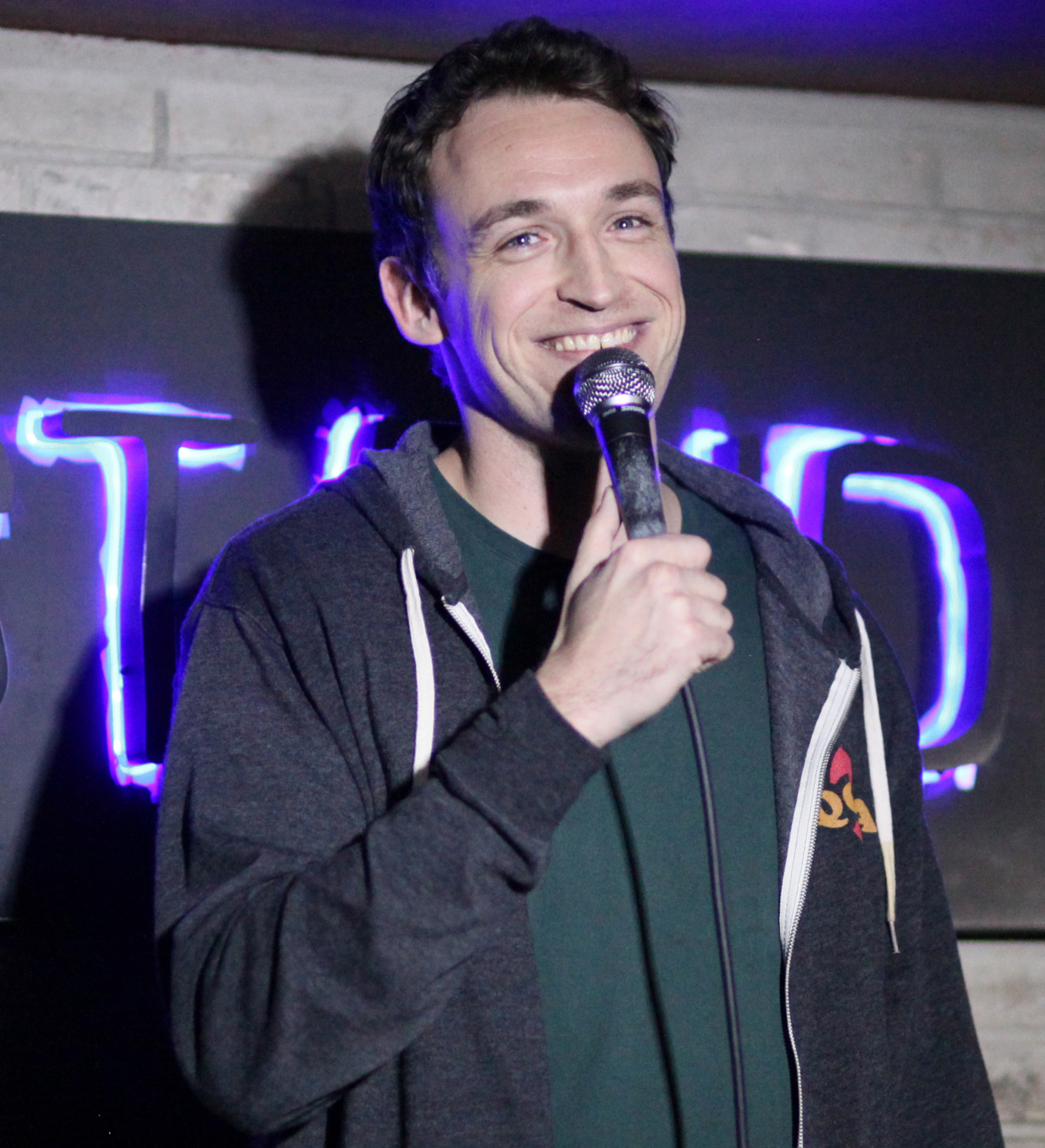
Soder performing in November 2016

Soder has appeared on Comedy Central's The Half Hour, Conan, Cum Town, Opie and Anthony, The Anthony Cumia Show, MTV2's Guy Code and Guy Court, Fox Sports 1's Garbage Time with Katie Nolan, the You Know What Dude! podcast with Robert Kelly, Legion of Skanks, and Perfect Guy Life. After the firing of Anthony Cumia from the Opie & Anthony Show, Soder was a frequent guest and "third mic" on Opie with Jim Norton, formerly on the Faction Talk channel on Sirius Satellite Radio. On July 27, 2015, Soder along with fellow stand-up comedian Big Jay Oakerson began their two-hour live radio talk show, The Bonfire, on SiriusXM's Comedy Central Radio channel airing every Monday through Thursday (previously Mondays and Wednesdays) from 6-8pm ET. In March 2021, the show began airing on Faction Talk from 5-7pm ET, after Comedy Central Radio ceased production on all of its talk shows. On February 22 2023, it was announced that Soder would be leaving The Bonfire and would be replaced by comedian Robert Kelly. In November 2023, Soder started his own podcast, Soder. In 2024, Soder launched the podcast, The Regz, with comedians Luis J. Gomez, Joe List, and Robert Kelly. He has also appeared on Stavvy's World, We Might Be Drunk, and Are You Garbage.

Soder appeared in multiple episodes as a guest star on Inside Amy Schumer beginning in 2014, and had a minor appearance in Amy Schumer's film Trainwreck (2015). On March 19, 2016, Dan Soder made a special guest appearance on the popular professional wrestling podcast Wrestling Soup. Soder is a lifelong fan of wrestling, and is particularly well known for his impression of "Macho Man" Randy Savage. Later that year, Soder began a recurring role on the Showtime drama series Billions and released his first hour long special on Comedy Central, titled Not Special. In late 2016, Soder was cast in the comedy Drunk Parents (2019), starring Alec Baldwin and Salma Hayek. In July 2017, Netflix released the first season of its new stand-up comedy series The Standups, in which Soder had a 30-minute set on the final episode.

In 2022, Soder appeared in the Showtime comedy series, Flatbush Misdemeanors. In 2026, he had a recurring role as Frank in Tires.

== Personal life ==
In December 2022, sports personality Katie Nolan announced her engagement to Soder. In 2025, Nolan said they parent a dog, have not started planning their wedding but may in the near future and do not see themselves having children.

== Filmography ==
Year	Title	Role	Notes
2013–2015	Guy Code	Himself	Seasons 3–5
2014–2016	Inside Amy Schumer	Various	4 episodes
2015	It Had to Be You	Chris	
2015	Trainwreck	Dumpster Guy	
2016	Night Train with Wyatt Cenac	Self	1 episode
2016–2023	Billions	Dudley Mafee	Recurring role
2017	The Standups	Self	1 episode
2019	Drunk Parents	Randall	
2019	Son of a Gary	Himself	HBO stand up special
2019	Robot Chicken	Plastic Army Man, Nerdy Basketball Player (voice)	Episode: "Garfield Stockman in: A Voice Like Wet Ham"
2022	Flatbush Misdemeanors	Ben	1 episode
2022	Paradise PD	"Macho Man" Randy Savage	5 episodes
2024	On the Road	Himself	YouTube stand up special
2026	Tires	Frank	3 episodes
