= Jamilah Lemieux =

American journalist

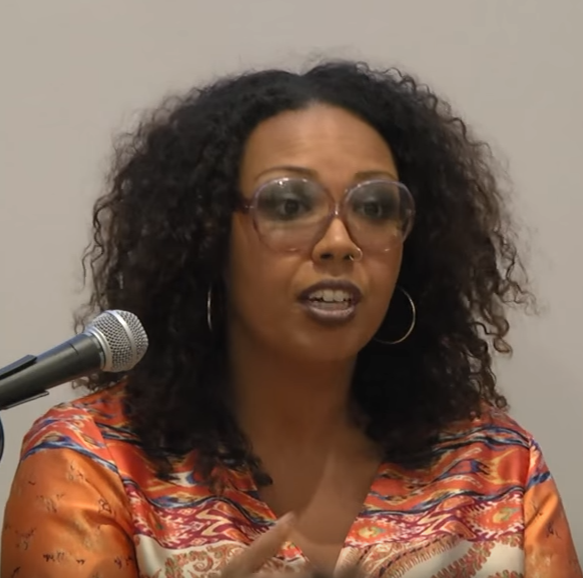
- Jamilah Lemieux at Brooklyn Museum in 2015
- Born: July 22, 1984 (age 42); Chicago, Illinois
- Education: Whitney M. Young Magnet High School; Howard University (BFA)
- Occupations: Columnist, editor, cultural critic
- Relatives: David Lemieux
- Writing career
- Language: English
- Genres: Feminism, race
- Website: www.jamilahlemieux.com

Jamilah Lemieux (born July 22, 1984) is an American writer, cultural critic, and editor. She is best known for her blog, The Beautiful Struggler. She has worked for Ebony, Cassius Magazine, and Interactive One, part of Radio One, Inc. Lemieux currently writes a parenting column for Slate, and co-hosts an accompanying podcast, Mom & Dad Are Fighting. In March 2026, Lemieux released her first book, Black. Single. Mother.: Real Tales of Longing and Belonging.

== Early life ==
Lemieux was born and raised in Chicago, Illinois. Her father is David Lemieux, a retired Chicago police officer who appeared in the 1973 film The Spook Who Sat by the Door. Her mother was active with the Student Nonviolent Coordinating Committee.

Lemieux received her Bachelor of Fine Arts in theater arts from Howard University. She is a graduate chapter member of the Alpha Kappa Alpha sorority.

== Career ==
=== Writing ===
After graduating from Howard University, she began her writing career through blogging and mainstream media. Her blog, The Beautiful Struggler, primarily centered on the topics of race and romantic relationships. She is a three-time Black Weblog Awards winner.

In 2011, Lemieux became the news and lifestyle editor for Ebony.com. She was promoted to senior editor in 2014. In late 2015, she became the senior editor for the print magazine.

Lemieux's writing has appeared in publications such as Mic, Essence, The Nation, The Washington Post, The New York Times, and The Guardian. Her writing generally centers cultural issues from a feminist perspective.

=== Other work ===
In 2009, she penned An Open Letter to Tyler Perry for NPR's All Things Considered. She also appears a TV commentator for networks such as CNN, MSNBC, NPR, and ABC, and she has been a guest on Comedy Central's The Nightly Show, MTV2's Uncommon Sense, Vice's Desus & Mero, as well as Revolt/Power 105.1's The Breakfast Club. She appeared as a commentator in the Surviving R. Kelly documentary series.

In 2016, she became the vice president of news and men's programming for Interactive One, part of Radio One, Inc. As a part of her work there she developed Cassius, a digital magazine for millennials of color.

Lemieux joined the Cynthia Nixon 2018 gubernatorial campaign as a communications advisor. In 2019, she worked as a consultant for Elizabeth Warren's presidential campaign.

== Personal life ==
Lemieux has one daughter, Naima (b. 2013).

== Accolades ==
- The Root, Root 100 (2014)
- Planned Parenthood, PPFA Media Awards, Excellence in Commentary (2015)
- BBC, 100 Women (2016)
