= The Captain (miniseries) =

2022 sports documentary miniseries

- Promotional poster
- Genre: Television documentary; Miniseries
- Directed by: Randy Wilkins
- Country of origin: United States
- Original language: English
- No. of seasons: 1
- No. of episodes: 7

Production
- Executive producers: Spike Lee; Michael Tollin; Mandalay Sports Media; Excel Media; Connor Schell
- Cinematography: Valentina Caniglia
- Camera setup: Single-camera
- Production company: ESPN Films

Original release
- Network: ESPN; ESPN+
- Release: July 18 – August 11, 2022

The Captain is a 2022 American sports documentary miniseries produced by ESPN Films. Directed by Randy Wilkins, the series focuses on the life and career of Derek Jeter, who served as captain of the New York Yankees of Major League Baseball. Debuting on ESPN and ESPN+ on July 18, the series has seven episodes, and ran until August 11. Spike Lee and Michael Tollin are executive producers on the series.

== Development and release ==
Derek Jeter, who founded The Players' Tribune in 2014 as a means of allowing athletes to tell their stories, decided that he wanted to make a miniseries that would document his life and career with the New York Yankees of Major League Baseball (MLB). He got the idea when he decided to document receiving the phone call that informed him that he had been elected to the National Baseball Hall of Fame in 2020. Jeter wanted Spike Lee to direct the series. Lee became an executive producer on the series, but was too busy to direct. He contacted Randy Wilkins, a protégé, in June 2020 to ask him to direct the series. Wilkins interviewed Jeter for over 30 hours and interviewed more than 90 people in total. The Players' Tribune and Casey Close produced the series. Michael Tollin, Mandalay Sports Media, Excel Media, and Connor Schell also served as executive producers, making the series in association with MLB.

ESPN Films announced the series in May 2021. The series premiered at the Tribeca Festival in June 2022. The first two episodes of the series had a premiere night at Yankee Stadium on July 7. It premiered on ESPN and ESPN+ on July 18 following the Home Run Derby.

== Synopsis ==
The majority of the series focuses on Jeter's tenure with the Yankees. The series documents Jeter's youth in the first episode, including a focus on his biracial identity and the racism he and his sister experienced as they grew up in Kalamazoo, Michigan, in the 1980s and 1990s. The series includes never-before-seen footage of Jeter's personal life, including his reaction to being selected by the Yankees in the 1992 MLB draft. It also covers Jeter's rift in his friendship with teammate Alex Rodriguez. The final episode serves as an epilogue, discussing Jeter's life after his retirement as a player, including his purchase of the Miami Marlins and decision to step down as chief executive officer.

The miniseries includes interviews with Jeter, his father Charles, mother Dorothy, sister Sharlee, and wife, Hannah Jeter. Also interviewed are Michael Jordan, Fat Joe, Desus Nice, The Kid Mero, Jadakiss, Eli Manning, and former Yankees players Rodriguez, Mariano Rivera, Jorge Posada, Tino Martinez, Paul O'Neill, CC Sabathia, Darryl Strawberry, Bernie Williams, Roger Clemens, and Andy Pettitte, as well as former manager Joe Torre, general manager Brian Cashman, and former coach Willie Randolph.

== Episodes ==
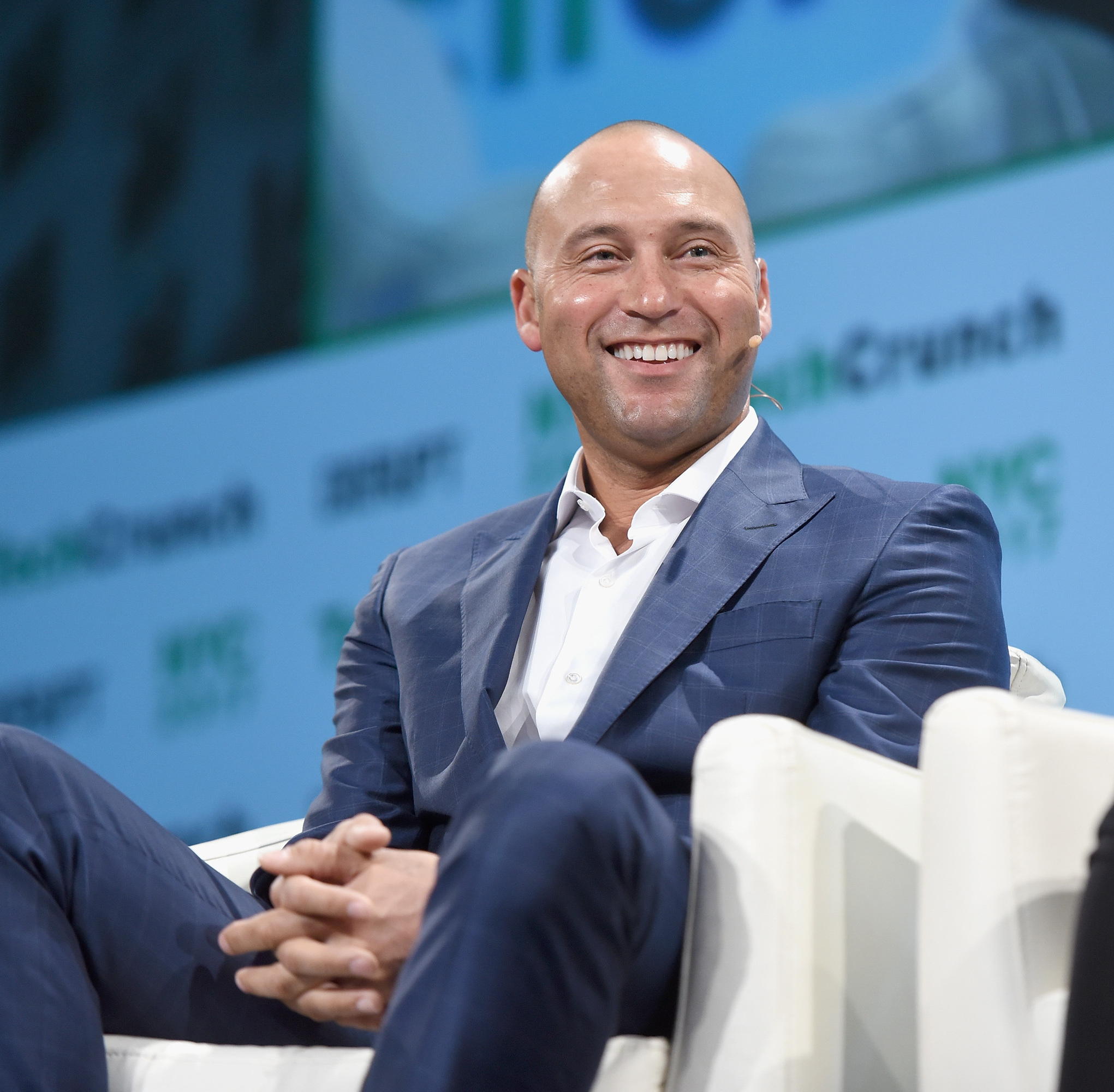
Derek Jeter in 2017

Episodes of The Captain
No.	Title	Directed by	Original release date	U.S. viewers (millions)
1	"No Blueprint for Success"	Randy Wilkins	July 18, 2022	N/A
Jeter's upbringing as a bi-racial kid in the Midwest and his journey to the major leagues. This episode features never before seen footage of Jeter getting drafted by the Yankees.
2	"Loyalty One Way"	Randy Wilkins	July 21, 2022	N/A
Jeter has an instant impact on the Yankees as he captures a title in his first season as a pro. This catapults him to superstardom but fame comes with a price. Jeter reveals the privileges and perils of fame. But through it all, Jeter becomes a leader on a team that is considered by many to be the greatest in the history of the game, the 1998 Yankees.
3	"I Don't Have to Be Your Best Friend"	Randy Wilkins	July 28, 2022	N/A
The importance of loyalty and trust to Jeter as the Yankees cap off a three peat beating the New York Mets, and his friendship with Alex Rodriguez is changed.
4	"Bigger Than Baseball"	Randy Wilkins	July 28, 2022	N/A
The Yankees Dynasty ends and we explore 9/11's impact on New York. The Yankees and Boston Red Sox's ancient blood feud is decided in an epic Game 7. Team dynamics change with the addition of new players and personalities.
5	"Hiding in Plain Sight"	Randy Wilkins	August 4, 2022	N/A
The Yankees and Jeter suffer the most historic loss in baseball history. Jeter's identity is under attack as he faces challenges in the press, on the field and in his clubhouse.
6	"Never Gave Up a Day in My Life"	Randy Wilkins	August 4, 2022	N/A
Jeter wins his 5th and final World Series and celebrates his 3000th hit, but it's not all smooth sailing for this aging superstar. As his career begins to come to an end, he goes through a very public and difficult contract negotiation that changes his relationship with the Yankees. For the first time ever, Jeter's wife Hannah gives us the backstory of their relationship and a behind the scenes look at Jeter's recovery from a career altering injury.
7	"A Star in the Fabric"	Randy Wilkins	August 11, 2022	N/A
Jeter and Hannah share intimate details of their difficult journey on the way to parenthood. Jeter achieves another dream by becoming the owner of the Miami Marlins, but his journey is fraught with criticism and unfinished business.

Episode descriptions are provided by ESPN.
