= Neo Yokio =

American animated TV series

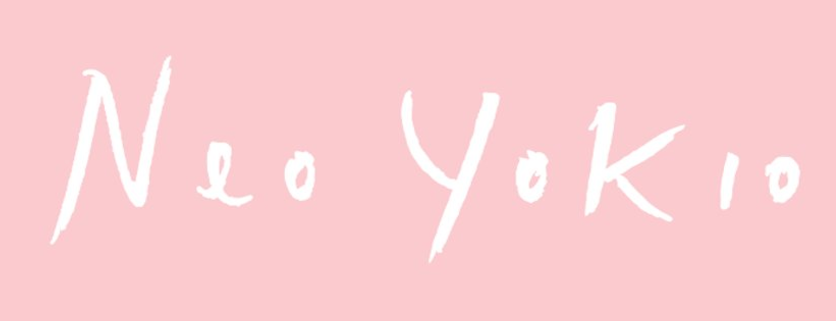
- Genre: Science fiction; Comic fantasy; Satire
- Created by: Ezra Koenig
- Screenplay by: Ezra Koenig; Nick Weidenfeld; Alexander Benaim
- Directed by: Kazuhiro Furuhashi; Junji Nishimura; Anthony Chun
- Creative director: Ben Jones (Note: Season One only)
- Voices of: Jaden Smith; Jude Law; Tavi Gevinson; Susan Sarandon; The Kid Mero; Desus Nice; Jason Schwartzman
- Composers: Jesse Novak; Will Wiesenfeld; Devonte Hynes
- Countries of origin: United States; Japan
- Original language: English
- No. of seasons: 1
- No. of episodes: 6 (+ 1 special)

Production
- Executive producers: Nick Weidenfeld; Hend Baghdady; Ezra Koenig; Chris Prynoski (Note: "Pink Christmas" special only); Ben Kalina; Angela Petrella (Note: co-executive producer, season one only)
- Producers: Matthew Chadwick; Andrew Chittenden; Kris Wood
- Running time: 22 minutes 65 minutes
- Production companies: Infinite Elegance, LLC; Friends Night; Studio Deen; Production I.G; Titmouse, Inc.; Digital eMation, Inc.

Original release
- Network: Netflix
- Release: September 22, 2017 – December 7, 2018

Neo Yokio (Japanese: ネオ・ヨキオ) is an adult animated television series created by Ezra Koenig of the indie rock band Vampire Weekend, and produced by Japanese anime studios Production I.G and Studio Deen. The first season, consisting of six episodes, premiered on Netflix on September 22, 2017. The Christmas special Neo Yokio: Pink Christmas was released on December 7, 2018 produced by Titmouse, Inc.. and animated by the South Korean studio Digital eMation.

== Plot ==
Netflix's press release describes Neo Yokio as the "greatest city in the world", a modern-day alternate timeline New York where Magicians saved the city from ruin by demons in the 19th century, gaining a place in the upper echelons of society and becoming known as "Magistocrats". The series revolves around Kaz Kaan (Jaden Smith), a vain and wealthy Magistocrat and his mecha butler Charles (Jude Law), as he balances a vapid and decadent life as a fashionista in the city with his demon-hunting duties managed by his stern Aunt Agatha (Susan Sarandon).

Kaz has taken to self-pity and "melancholy" after his recent break-up with investment banker Cathy (Alexa Chung) and only wishes to live a life of luxury with his socialite friends Lexy (The Kid Mero) and Gottlieb (Desus Nice). His rival is Arcangelo (Jason Schwartzman), an old money scion who belittles Kaz's "neo riche" status, and the two are often in competition for the top spot on the Bachelor's List, a gigantic public billboard of Neo Yokio's most eligible bachelors. Former fashion blogger Helena St. Tessero (Tavi Gevinson) becomes re-acquainted with Kaz in the first episode after he performs an exorcism on a possessed Chanel suit. However, the possession leaves Helena disillusioned with Neo Yokio and the capitalist system, eventually leading her to become a hikikomori, an anti-capitalist critic and a foil to Kaz's vapid focus on fashion and social status.

== Cast ==
Actor	Character	Appearances
Jaden Smith	Kaz Kaan	Starring
Jude Law	Charles	Starring
Tavi Gevinson	Helena St. Tessero	Starring
Susan Sarandon	Aunt Agatha	Starring
The Kid Mero	Lexy	Starring
Desus Nice	Gottlieb	Starring
Jason Schwartzman	Arcangelo Corelli	Starring
Richard Ayoade	Various	Recurring
Alexa Chung	Cathy	Recurring
Willow Smith	The Helenists	Recurring
Kiernan Shipka	The Helenists	Recurring
Amandla Stenberg	The Helenists	Recurring
John DiMaggio	Various	Recurring
Peter Serafinowicz	Various	Recurring
Steve Buscemi	The Remembrancer	Guest
Annet Mahendru	Mila Malevich	Guest
Ike Barinholtz	Jeffrey	Guest
Stephen Fry	Headmaster	Guest
Katy Mixon	Sailor Pellegrino	Guest
Nico Muhly	Professor Muhly	Guest
Frank Vincent	Uncle Albert	Guest
Ray Wise	Old Man in the Graveyard	Guest
Ben Jones	Maxwell	Guest
David Macklovitch	Dave 1	Guest
Simon Hammerstein	Himself	Guest
Kimberly Nichole	Herself	Guest

== Production ==
Neo Yokio was originally announced, without a title, at Production I.G.'s panel at Anime Expo in 2015. The series was originally intended to run as part of Fox's Animation Domination High-Def late night block, which had just transitioned from the Fox network to sister cable network FXX earlier that year. No further details about the series were announced in the months following, and Animation Domination High-Def ceased operations in 2016.

While the writing and post-production were done in the United States, the character design, pre-production and storyboards were created in Japan.

On September 7, 2017, Netflix announced they had acquired the unaired Neo Yokio series to stream on their service, labeling it as a Netflix Original Series.

== Episodes ==
Series overview
Season	Episodes	Originally released
1	6	September 22, 2017
Special	1	December 7, 2018

=== Season 1 (2017) ===
No. overall	No. in season	Title	Directed by	Written by	Original release date
1	1	The Sea Beneath 14th St. Transliteration: "Za shī binīsu 14 th sutorīto" (Japanese: ザ シー ビニース 14th ストリート)	Kazuhiro Furuhashi	Story by : Ezra Koenig; Teleplay by : Nick Weidenfeld	September 22, 2017
Between bemoaning his ex, performing an exorcism and playing field hockey, Kaz Kaan has little time to worry about his place among Neo Yokio society.
2	2	A Pop Star of Infinite Elegance; Transliteration: "Mugen no eregansu o motsu poppusutā" (Japanese: 無限のエレガンスを持つポップスター)	Kazuhiro Furuhashi	Story by : Ezra Koenig; Teleplay by : Nick Weidenfeld	September 22, 2017
The Black and White Ball is approaching and Kaz has problems galore, including a disinterested date, a scheming rival and (gasp!) the wrong color tux.
3	3	O, the Helenists... Transliteration: "Ō, herenisuto-tachi…" (Japanese: おお、ヘレニストたち…)	Junji Nishimura	Ezra Koenig	September 22, 2017
Kaz visits his old school to teach a trio of insolent students about elegance. Meanwhile, Gottlieb and Lexy ask Kaz to endorse their new cocktail.
4	4	Hamptons Water Magic; Transliteration: "Hanputonzu u~ōtā majikku" (Japanese: ハンプトンズ ウォーター マジック)	Junji Nishimura	Ezra Koenig	September 22, 2017
Distressing news sends Kaz to the Hamptons to settle some family affairs. While there, he learns there's more to Charles than he thought.
5	5	The Russians? Exactly, the Soviets; Transliteration: "Roshiahito? Masani, Soren" (Japanese: ロシア人？まさに、ソ連)	Kazuhiro Furuhashi	Story by : Ezra Koenig; Teleplay by : Alexander Benaim	September 22, 2017
Kaz finds that keeping the Soviet Union's Grand Prix driver out of trouble is surprisingly difficult. Meanwhile, Arcangelo makes a peace offering.
6	6	I'm Starting to Think Neo Yokio's Not the Greatest City in the World; Transliteration: "Neo yokio wa sekai saidai no toshide wa nai to omoi hajimete iru" (Japanese: ネオ・ヨキオは世界最大の都市ではないと思い始めている)	Kazuhiro Furuhashi	Ezra Koenig	September 22, 2017
Kaz and his friends vow to help Helena escape the Remembrancer's clutches, but the Grand Prix complicates their escape.

=== Christmas special (2018) ===
No. overall	No. in season	Title	Directed by	Written by	Original release date
7	1	Neo Yokio: Pink Christmas; Transliteration: "Neo yokio pinku kurisumasu" (Japanese: ネオ・ヨキオ ピンク・クリスマス)	Anthony Chun	Story by : Ezra Koenig; Teleplay by : Nick Weidenfeld	December 7, 2018
The holidays take a hit as Kaz juggles the Secret Santa competition, his Aunt Angelique's visit and his nemesis Arcangelo's Christmas plotting.

On October 9, 2018, Netflix announced that a Neo Yokio Christmas special would be released on December 7, 2018. Trailers were released in October 2018, in November 2018, and on December 3, 2018. It was released on December 7, 2018 as an hour-long special titled Neo Yokio: Pink Christmas.

Neo Yokio: Pink Christmas features Kaz Kaan, who must defeat a giant sentient Christmas tree threatening the city of Neo Yokio. He also has to handle a Secret Santa competition, a visit by his Aunt Angelique, and plotting from Arcangelo. The special includes Jamie Foxx as a voice actor, while recurring characters are voiced by Jaden Smith, Susan Sarandon, Jude Law, and Jason Schwartzman. Pink Christmas includes an original new song by Koenig, "Friend Like You". It appears several times in the episode, and at the time of the premiere, had not appeared as a song elsewhere or for download.

== Reception ==
The series received mixed reviews, with a common criticism being the main character Kaz Kaan. Mike Toole from Anime News Network called the show "nigh-unwatchable codswallop", expressing issues with the bad voice acting of its cast, and with its poor animation and writing. Julia Alexander of Polygon called the show a poor attempt to bring Jaden Smith's Twitter persona into a series as Jaden's character Kaz is annoying, self-centered, narcissistic and infuriating rather than likable.

IGN gave it a negative review, with reviewer Miranda Sanchez criticizing the artwork, calling it humorless, and saying that it "feigns sincerity in any serious issue it tackles". Dana Schwartz of Entertainment Weekly gave the first season a positive review, saying it was "both deeply ironic and entirely deadpan and we should be so grateful that this vanity-project-cum-genius-conceptional-art-piece somehow exists in the real world".

Among the more positive reviews was Clio Chang's in The New Republic, who described Smith's performance as "exquisitely deadpan [..] that serves to heighten his detached snobbery" and that Neo Yokio "mostly feels like an introduction to what could be a really groundbreaking show", while also calling out its "cringe-worthy moments". Mike Hale of The New York Times praised the show's satire, stating, "The show derives a lot of its humor from Kaz's earnest attempts to belong, which occasion some reasonably subtle mockery of the city's social stratification and of a certain strain of tragic millennial mopiness", while noting, "if [watchers don't stick around], it may be because they find the humor too precious." Ryan F. Mandelbaum at Gizmodo compared the show to "a six episode long dril tweet" and "Gossip Girl as told by a stoned Tim and Eric fan", praising its surreal humor and finding the show's depiction of contemporary urban life "far closer to reality—albeit a ridiculous one—than its premise may suggest".
