= Jon Gabrus =

American actor and comedian (born 1982)

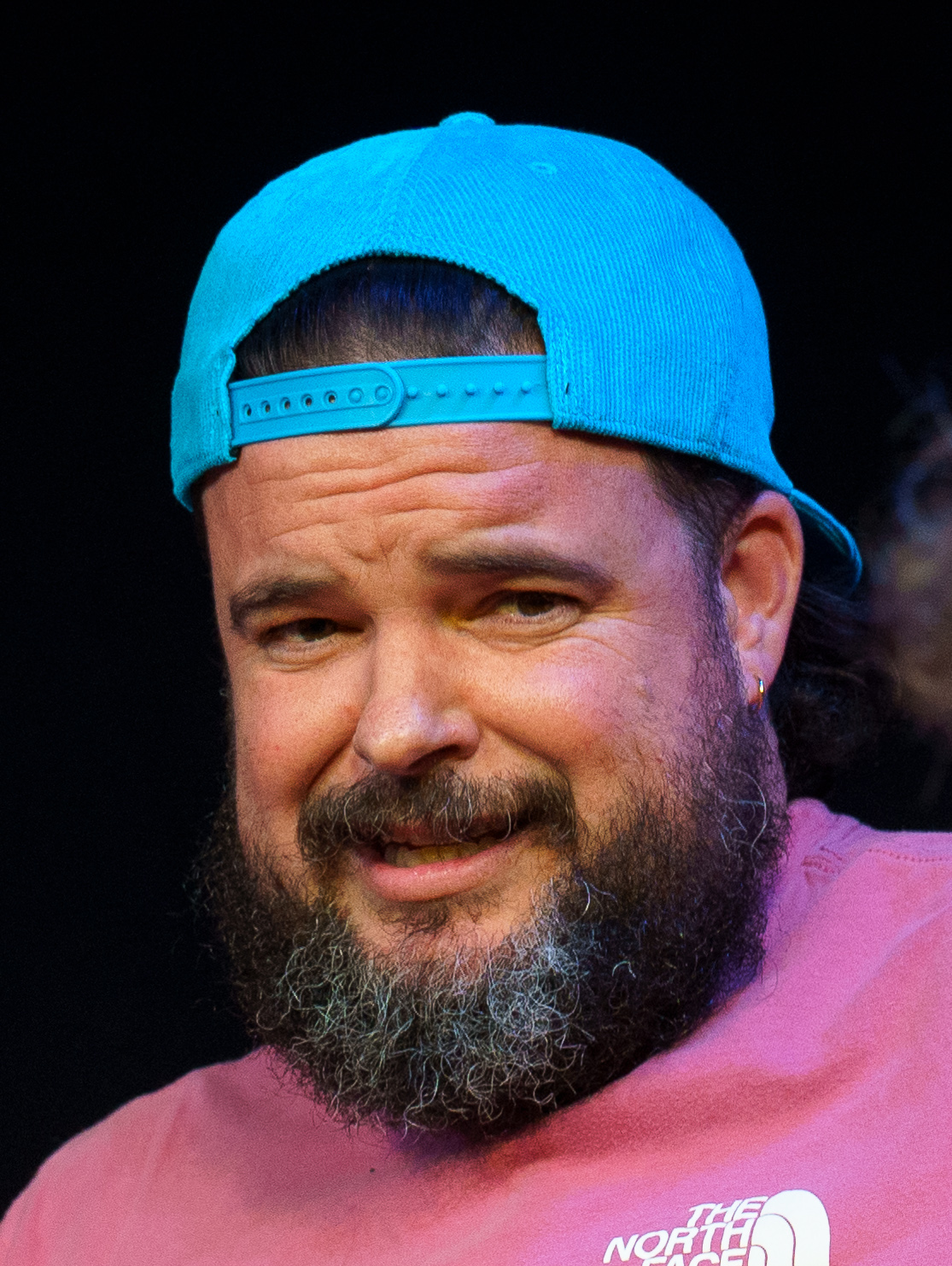
- Gabrus in 2024
- Born: January 31, 1982 (age 44); Long Island, New York, U.S.
- Occupations: Actor, comedian
- Years active: 2005–present

Jon Gabrus (born January 31, 1982) is an American actor and comedian, best known for his work on Guy Code, the podcast Comedy Bang! Bang!, and TVLand's Younger. He was a performer at the Upright Citizens Brigade Theatre and hosted the High and Mighty podcast, as well as co-hosting the Raised By TV and Action Boyz podcasts.

== Early life and education ==
Jonathan Gabrus was born and raised in Long Island in the town of Bellmore. He attended Wellington C. Mepham High School where he was a part of the football and swim teams. Gabrus was a lifeguard in the summers during school at Field 6, Jones Beach State Park. After graduation Gabrus attended Marist College where he played club rugby. Gabrus' admission essay was about Popeye.

== Career ==
Jon Gabrus began performing at the Upright Citizens Brigade Theatre in New York in 2005 and currently performs at the theater in Los Angeles. At UCB, he has been a member of the teams Mailer Daemon, fwand, The Law Firm, and Your F'd Up Family. His one-person show "Blackout Drunk" also played at the theater. He has been a regular panelist for MTV2's Guy Code for five seasons and has played recurring roles on TV shows like Younger, Comedy Bang! Bang!, and The Hotwives of Las Vegas.

In 2015, Gabrus was a contestant on the short internet game show from CollegeHumor "Um, Actually". He also began hosting the podcast High and Mighty on Amir Blumenfeld and Jake Hurwitz's HeadGum network. He appears frequently on the podcasts improv4humans and Comedy Bang! Bang! On the latter, he plays the character of Gino Lombardo, host Scott Aukerman's very thin intern. On September 25, 2015, it was reported that Gabrus would co-write a half-hour spy comedy for Fox with Paul Lieberstein and potentially star in the project.

In 2022, Gabrus and Adam Pally launched 101 Places to Party Before You Die on TruTV. 2025, Gabrus launched the Staying Alive podcast, with his co-host Adam Pally on Smartless Media.

In 2026, Gabrus joined the cast of DINKS, an improvised multi-camera sitcom from Amazon Studios starring Paul Scheer and June Diane Raphael.

== Filmography ==
=== Film ===
Year	Title	Role	Notes
2011	A Kiss for Jed	Guy 1 (Blarney Stone)	
2013	Awful Nice	Klaus	
2015	4th Man Out	Ortu	
2016	Flock of Dudes	Gabrus	
2017	The Little Hours	Guard Gregorio	
2018	Game Over, Man!	Husky Hostage	
2019	Scare Package	MISTER member	Segment "M.I.S.T.E.R."
2019	Bombshell	Sound Man	
2020	Bad Hair	Valet	
2024	Drugstore June	Shane	
2024	Micro Budget	Chris	
2025	F*** Marry Kill	Jon	
2026	Basic	Bouncer	

=== Television ===
==== Scripted ====
Year	Title	Role	Notes
2006	Late Night with Conan O'Brien	Various	Episode #13.147
2012	Big Lake	Pizza Guy	Episode: "Chris Is Mayor For 24 Minutes"
2012	Happy Endings	Cashier	Episode: "The Kerkovich Way"
2013	Muhammad Ali's Greatest Fight	Stoned Clerk	Television film
2014	The Fuzz	Officer Sanchez	5 episodes
2014	Newsreaders	Tommy Goldman	Episode: "Go Nadz; Talkin' News"
2014–2015	Comedy Bang! Bang!	Various	Recurring, 4 episodes
2015	Workaholics	Jamie	Episode: "Peyote It Forward"
2015	Playing House	Roadie	Episode: "Celebrate Me Scones"
2015–2017	Adam Ruins Everything	Various	Recurring, 4 episodes
2015	The Hotwives of Las Vegas	Junior	Recurring, 6 episodes
2015–2016	Younger	Gabe	Recurring, 8 episodes
2016	Bajillion Dollar Propertie$	Jumbo Haynes	Episode: "Make Partner Part 2"
2016	Bones	Jeff "Doc" Dockerty	Episode: "The Head in the Abutment"
2017	Big Mouth	Movie Theater Customer (voice)	Episode: "Am I Gay?"
2018–2019	Drunk History	Himself	3 episodes
2018	Another Period	Hobo	Episode: "Lucky Chang's"
2018–2022	Craig of the Creek	Paintball Benny (voice)	6 episodes
2018	Animals.	McManus (voice)	2 episodes
2019	What We Do in the Shadows	Wharfinger	2 episodes
2019	Astronomy Club: The Sketch Show	Executive	Episode: "Ice Cube Day"
2020	Brooklyn Nine-Nine	Fireman Curt	Episode: "Lights Out"
2020	American Dad!	Horse Stable Owner (voice)	Episode: "Roger Needs Dick"
2021	Pretty Smart	Sauna Gary	Episode: "I mean... just watch!"
2022	Maggie	Driver	Episode: "I See a Baby in Your Future"
2022	StoryBots: Answer Time	(voice)	Episode: "Lasers"
2025	Clean Slate		Episode: "Chrome Jesus"
2026	DINKS	Ronan	Premiering 2026

==== Unscripted ====
Year	Title	Role	Notes
2011–2012	The Substitute	Host	
2011–2015	Guy Code	Himself	
2012–2013	Money From Strangers	Himself	
2013	Guy Court	Himself	
2014–2017	Wild 'n Out	Himself	
2015	Hair Jacked	Host	
2015	Santas in the Barn	Host	
2018	Nailed It!	Himself	Episode: "High Society"
2020	The George Lucas Talk Show	Himself	Episode: "SithTrax"
2022	Is It Cake?	Judge	Episode: "Cake Crashers"
2022	101 Places To Party Before You Die	Himself	
2022	Um, Actually...	Himself	Episodes: "Um Actually Smackdown", "Spongebob, Lord of the Rings, The Twilight Zone"
2023	Dirty Laundry	Himself	Episode: "Who Had to Join a Union Because of Their Ass?"
2024	Smartypants	Himself	Episode: "Presidents, Zzyzx, Rollercoasters, Night Owls"
2025	Gastronauts	Himself	Episode: "Doggone Good"
