= Andrew Schulz =

American comedian and actor (born 1983)

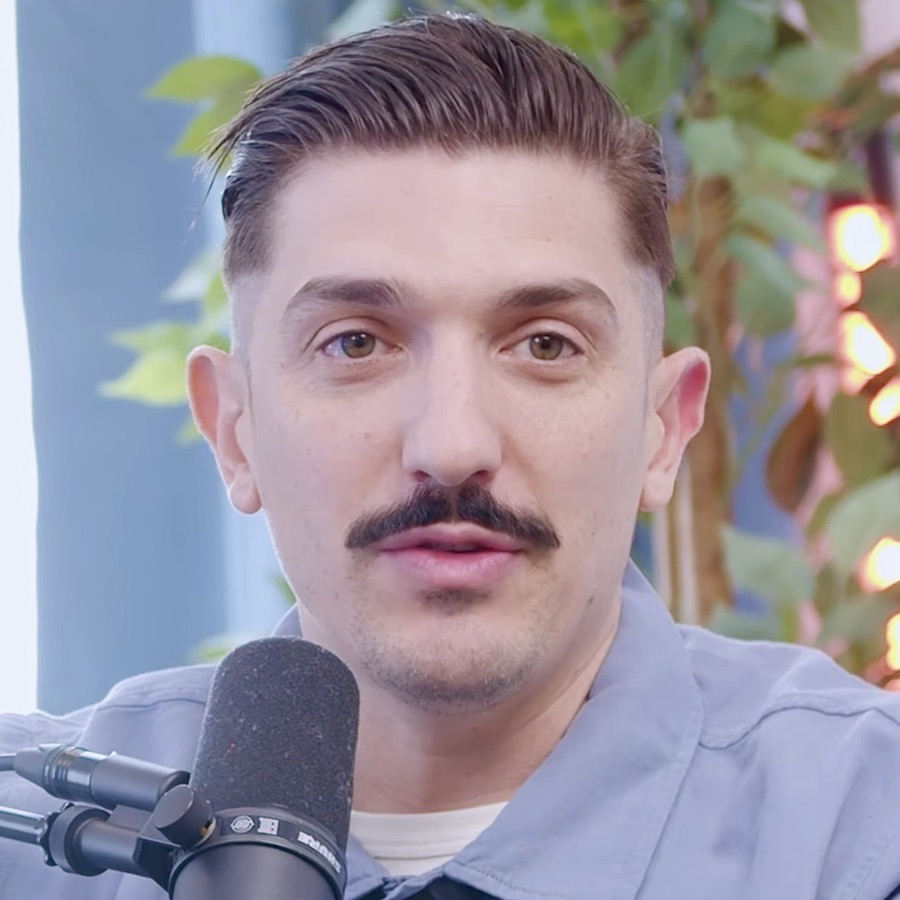
- Schulz in 2025
- Born: Andrew Cameron Schulz; October 30, 1983 (age 43); New York City, U.S.
- Education: University of California, Santa Barbara (BA)
- Spouse: Emma Turner (m. 2021)
- Children: 2

Comedy career
- Years active: 2000s–present
- Medium: Stand-up; television; film; podcast
- Genres: Observational comedy; sketch comedy; black comedy; insult comedy; surreal humor; satire
- Subjects: American culture; American politics; pop culture; recreational drug use; current events; human sexuality
- Website: theandrewschulz.com

Andrew Cameron Schulz (born October 30, 1983) is an American stand-up comedian, actor, and podcaster. In addition to his stand-up, he is known for his work on MTV2's Guy Code, the Flagrant podcast with Akaash Singh, and as co-host of The Brilliant Idiots podcast with Charlamagne Tha God. Schulz's first Netflix special, Schulz Saves America, premiered in December 2020.

== Early life and education ==
Schulz was born on October 30, 1983, in New York City to parents Larry and Sandra Schulz (née Cameron). His mother, a Scottish immigrant, was a professional ballroom dancer. His father, a native New Yorker of German and Irish descent, is a former reporter and military veteran born to a family originally from Chicago, Illinois. Schulz's parents owned the Sandra Cameron Dance Center in Lower Manhattan for three decades.

Schulz was raised in the East Village and attended New York City Public Schools, including Lillie Devereaux Blake Primary School and Robert F. Wagner Middle School on the Upper East Side. He is a graduate of Baruch College Campus High School in Kips Bay. Schulz then attended the University of California, Santa Barbara, from which he graduated with a bachelor of arts degree in psychology.

== Career ==
=== Stand-up comedy ===
Schulz began performing stand-up during college in California and continued when he returned to New York in the mid-2000s. He became a regular at the Comedy Village and went on to make his debut at the Edinburgh Comedy Festival in Scotland, in 2008.

In September 2017, Schulz self-released his first comedy special, 4:4:1, on YouTube. In June 2018, Schulz followed up with his debut comedy album, 5:5:1, which earned the top ranking on iTunes' comedy album charts. The album went on to rank number one on Apple Music, Google Play, and Amazon. The album went number one on the Billboard comedy album charts the week of June 23, 2018. In 2021, Schulz issued a pair of streaming EPs, Views from the Cis and Brilliant Idiot. On July 25, 2022, he released another special on his YouTube channel titled "Infamous".

In 2025, Schulz performed at the Riyadh Comedy Festival.

=== Television, film, and web series ===
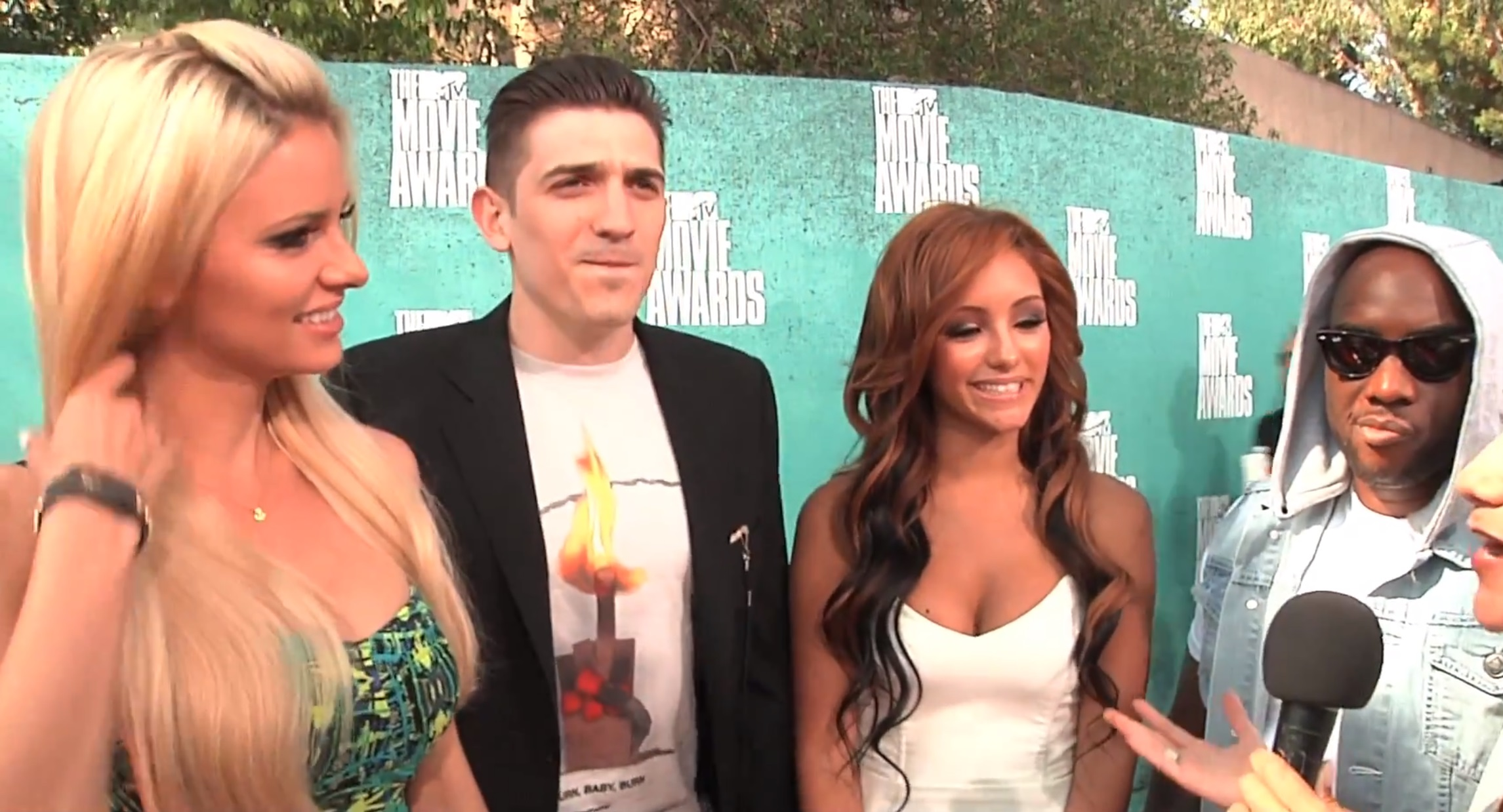
Schulz with fellow Guy Code cast members April Rose, Melanie Iglesias, and Charlamagne tha God at the MTV Movie Awards in 2012

Schulz has hosted or appeared on numerous MTV and MTV2 shows, including Jobs That Don't Suck, Guy Code, Guy Court, Girl Code and The Hook Up. In 2015, he starred in the IFC series Benders. He also acted in Amazon's Sneaky Pete (2015, 2017), Hulu's There's Johnny! (2017), and HBO's Crashing (2018). Schulz appeared in the feature films The Female Brain (2017), Write When You Get Work (2018), No Safe Spaces (2019), and the remake of White Men Can't Jump (2023). His web series credits include writing and starring in Rise of the Radio Show and The Apartmentship.

A four-part Netflix special, Schulz Saves America, premiered on December 17, 2020. The special was criticized for its anti-Asian jokes blaming Asians for the COVID-19 pandemic. In May 2024, Schulz participated in Netflix's The Roast of Tom Brady. In March of 2025, Schulz dropped his first stand-up hour for Netflix, Life.

In April 2026, it was announced that Schulz would star alongside Zarna Garg, P.J. Byrne, and Tan France in the romantic comedy Clashing Through The Snow, which will stream on Amazon Prime.

=== Podcasts ===
Schulz co-hosts The Brilliant Idiots with fellow former MTV2 personality Charlamagne tha God, which launched in 2013.

Schulz also hosts Flagrant (formerly Flagrant 2) with his best friends and fellow stand-up comedians, Akaash Singh and Mark Gagnon, and video editor AlexxMedia, which launched in 2017.

On a July 2024 episode of Flagrant with guest British podcasters Shxt N Gigs, Schulz made a number of jokes about black women. Several listeners criticized the jokes, arguing that they perpetuated the racist "angry black woman" stereotype. Following backlash, Shxt N Gigs hosts James Duncan and Fuhad Dawodu apologised, with Duncan stating, "Andrew was making a joke, frankly a racist joke, and we were laughing at it. There's literally no excuse."

In November 2024, rapper Kendrick Lamar's single GNX on the album of the same name included the lyric: "Don’t let no white comedian talk about no black woman, that's law". Fans interpreted this as a reference to comedian Schulz. Schulz responded on Flagrant with a joke about Lamar's size, implying that he could physically assault him if he wished. The joke drew widespread criticism and accusations of racism. The controversy sparked discussions across social media and podcasts about race, consent, and the limits of comedy in public commentary.

In October 2024 Schulz hosted an episode with then-presidential candidate Donald Trump. He later went on to defend his actions in the Triggernometry podcast, stating that Democrats were "not cool" and his vote being based on "who gets the most pussy". Regarding the controversial quote, Schulz later said "I shouldn’t have said it like that" in an interview with The New York Times. Since the 2024 election, Flagrant has featured a variety of politicians and political commentators, such as Bernie Sanders, Pete Buttigieg, and Ro Khanna. He has since regretted his support of Trump, stating, "Everything he campaigned on, I believe that he wanted to do. And now he's doing the exact opposite of every single campaign promise... I voted for none of this. He's doing the exact opposite of everything I voted for."

Schulz appeared on the Full Send Podcast in November 2022, however, due to "drama" and "awkwardness" with co-host Steiny, the podcast wasn't released until July 2023.

== Personal life ==
On December 18, 2021, Schulz married Emma Turner in Montecito, California. His wife gave birth to a girl, Shiloh Jean Schulz, in February 2024. Their daughter was conceived through in vitro fertilization. Schulz and Turner welcomed their son, Lincoln Lawrence Schulz, in January 2026.

== Filmography ==
=== Film ===
Year	Title	Role	Notes
2017	The Female Brain	Andi	
2018	Write When You Get Work	Mitchell Mullen Vega	
2019	Feast of the Seven Fishes	Angelo	
2023	You People	Cousin Avi	
2023	White Men Can't Jump	TJ	
2024	The Underdoggs	Chip Collins	
2024	Upgraded	Ronnie	
2024	The Thicket	Hector	
2026	Street Fighter	Dan Hibiki	
2026	How to Rob a Bank	Andrew	
2026	Clashing Through the Snow †	Walter	Post-production
2028	Miami Vice '85 †		Filming
TBA	Running †		Filming

=== Television ===
Year	Title	Role	Notes
2011–15	Guy Code	Himself	Main Cast
2012–13	Big Morning Buzz Live	Himself/Panelist	Recurring Guest
2013	The Challenge	Himself	Episode: "ChallengeMania: The Road to Rivals II"
2013	Guy Court	Himself	Recurring Guest
2013–17	Red Eye	Himself/Panelist	Recurring Guest
2014	Jobs That Don't Suck	Himself/Host	Main Host
2015	Benders	Paul Rosenberg	Main Cast
2015–17	Sneaky Pete	Nathaniel	Episode: "Pilot" & "Safe"
2015	MTV's New Year's Eve 2015	Self; Pre-taped segments	
2016	Uncommon Sense with Charlamagne	Himself	Main Guest: Season 2
2016	Guy Code vs. Girl Code	Himself	Main Cast
2016	Acting Out	Himself	Episode: "Episode #1.6"
2017	There's... Johnny!	Mitch	Recurring Cast
2018	Crashing	Andrew	Episode: "Bill Burr"
2018	Fake News at Night	Himself	Episode: "Episode #1.10"
2019	Something's Burning	Himself	Episode: "Yannis Pappas & Andrew Schulz Make Matzo Ball Soup"
2022	That Damn Michael Che	Himself	Episode: "Black Mediocrity"
2024–present	Tires	Andy	Recurring Cast

=== Comedy Specials ===
Year	Title	Distribution	Notes
2017	4:4:1	YouTube	
2018	5:5:1	YouTube	
2019	The crowd work special	Youtube	
2020	Schulz Saves America	Netflix	
2022	Infamous	Independent	
2025	Life	Netflix	

=== Comedy Albums ===
Year	Title	Distribution	Notes
2021	Views From The Cis	Pandora, Spotify, Apple Music, Amazon	
2021	Brilliant Idiot	Pandora, Spotify, Apple Music, Amazon	

=== Documentary ===
Year	Title
2017	Funny Pains
2019	No Safe Spaces
