= Desus Nice =

American comedian (born 1981)

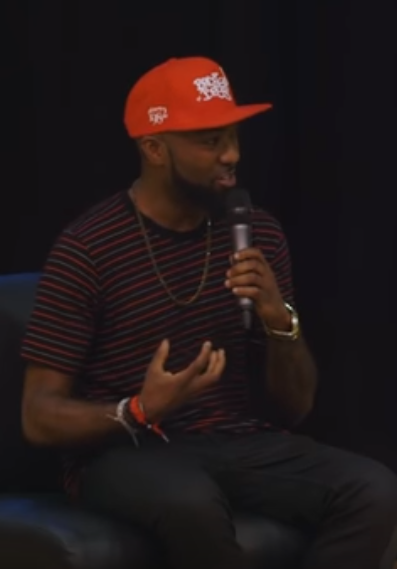
- Desus Nice in 2018
- Born: Daniel Baker; May 18, 1981 (age 45); The Bronx, New York, U.S.
- Education: College of Mount Saint Vincent
- Notable work: Desus vs. Mero; Bodega Boys; Joking Off; Guy Code; Desus & Mero (2016–18); Desus & Mero (2019–2022); Desus Pieces (2026-Present)

Comedy career
- Years active: 2013–present
- Medium: Television; Podcast; YouTube
- Genres: Observational comedy; Political satire
- Subjects: Jamaican American culture; Race relations; Pop culture; Current events

Daniel Baker (born May 18, 1981), known professionally as Desus Nice (/ˈdiːzəs ˈnaɪs/), is an American television, YouTube, and Twitter personality.

He rose to prominence alongside The Kid Mero, with whom he worked as comedy partners for over a decade; they first collaborated on Complex TV's Desus vs. Mero podcast (2013–2014) followed by their long-running Bodega Boys podcast (2015–2022). Beginning in 2016, he was the co-host of the talk shows Desus & Mero on Viceland and, subsequently, Desus & Mero on Showtime (2019–2022).

== Early life ==
Baker was born on May 18, 1981, in The Bronx, New York City, to Jamaican immigrant parents. He was raised in the Wakefield section of The Bronx with his three siblings. Growing up, his mother was the senior librarian at the New York Public Library's Soundview Library branch. His father is a landlord.

Baker attended the nearby Pablo Casals Middle School in Co-op City, where he met Chris Hayes in the gifted program, before going on to attend Herbert H. Lehman High School. He earned a degree in Literature from the College of Mount Saint Vincent.

Baker enjoyed working with computers from a young age. His ability to fix his family's computer during his childhood earned him the nickname "Jesus", which he changed to Desus to reflect his first name.

He worked several jobs before joining Black Enterprise as a small business columnist, where he remained until 2014 before leaving to pursue a career in television.

== Career ==
In December 2014, MTV announced that Desus Nice and The Kid Mero would be joining the cast of Guy Code for season 5, along with eleven other new cast members. They appeared on the first episode of season 5 which aired on January 14, 2015. After building a relationship with MTV and MTV2, Desus and Mero appeared on other shows including Uncommon Sense and Joking Off.

On September 12, 2015, Desus along with co-host The Kid Mero released the first episode of their Bodega Boys podcast. They recorded their comedic takes on all things pop culture weekly at Red Bull Studios New York for several years before making the move to the "jam room" in Milk Studios.

On August 30, 2016, Viceland announced Desus & Mero which premiered on October 17, 2016. The half-hour show ran Monday through Thursday hosted by the Bronx-reared comedic duo. Its finale aired on June 28, 2018. Desus co-hosted Desus & Mero, which premiered on February 21, 2019, on Showtime and ran until June 2022.

The week of October 23, 2023, he was a guest host of The Daily Show.

In February 2026, Nice premiered Desus Pieces, an independently released series on YouTube.

== Personal life ==
Until 2022 Baker lived in the Mott Haven section of the South Bronx, after which he moved to Los Angeles.

== Filmography ==
Year	Title	Role	Notes
2013–2014	Desus vs. Mero	Himself	With The Kid Mero
2015	Guy Code	Himself	With The Kid Mero
2015	Joking Off	Himself	With The Kid Mero
2015–2022	Bodega Boys	Himself	With The Kid Mero
2015–2016	Uncommon Sense	Himself	With The Kid Mero
2016–2018	Desus & Mero	Himself	With The Kid Mero
2017	Neo Yokio	Gottlieb (voice role)	With The Kid Mero
2019–2022	Desus & Mero	Himself	With The Kid Mero
2022	The Proud Family: Louder and Prouder	College KG Leibowitz-Jenkins (voice role)	Episode: "When You Wish Upon a Roker"
2022	The Captain	Himself	Sports documentary
2022	Jimmy Kimmel Live!	Himself (Guest host)	Episode: August 15
2023	The Daily Show	Himself (Guest host)	Week of October 23
