= Then and Now with Andy Cohen =

- Genre: Reality television
- Presented by: Andy Cohen
- Country of origin: United States
- Original language: English
- No. of seasons: 1
- No. of episodes: 3

Production
- Executive producers: Randy Barbato; Fenton Bailey; Tom Campbell; Erin Dean; Andy Cohen
- Running time: 42 minutes
- Production companies: World of Wonder; Most Talkative Productions

Original release
- Network: Bravo
- Release: December 13 – December 23, 2015

Then and Now with Andy Cohen is an American television series starring Andy Cohen that premiered on December 13, 2015, on the Bravo cable network. The three-part limited series features Cohen remembering the most important pop culture events that happened in three years – 1989, 1994, and 2000. In every episode the host, along with various guests, discuss "the most influential trends and events that shaped that year and reveal how the past has impacted the cultural nuances of today in unexpected ways."

== Episodes ==
No.	Title	Original release date
1	"1994"	December 13, 2015
The topics include: the O. J. Simpson murder case, the launch of Amazon.com, the premiere of Friends, the introduction of "Don't Ask, Don't Tell" policy, and the death of Kurt Cobain.
2	"1989"	December 16, 2015
The topics include: the beginning of Botox usage, the release of Do the Right Thing, the outbreak of AIDS and its impact, the premiere of MTV's House of Style, the emergence of fitness culture.
3	"2000"	December 23, 2015
The topics include: the dot-com bubble, the premiere of Sex and the City, the year 2000 problem, the start of reality shows such as Big Brother and Survivor.
