= Desus & Mero (2019 TV series) =

American television late-night talk show

- Genre: Late-night talk show
- Starring: Desus Nice; The Kid Mero
- Country of origin: United States
- Original language: English
- No. of seasons: 4
- No. of episodes: 174

Production
- Executive producers: Daniel "Desus Nice" Baker; Joel "The Kid Mero" Martinez; Victor Lopez; Tony Hernandez; Lilly Burns
- Running time: 30 minutes
- Production companies: Bodega Boys Original Chopped Cheese; Jax Media

Original release
- Network: Showtime
- Release: February 21, 2019 – June 23, 2022

Related
- Desus & Mero (2016); Desus vs. Mero

Desus & Mero is an American television late-night talk show hosted by comedians Desus Nice and The Kid Mero. The show aired from February 2019 to June 2022 on the premium cable and streaming service Showtime.

== History ==
Desus & Mero is the third series co-hosted by the pair, following the 2014 Complex TV web series Desus vs. Mero, and the 2016 Viceland television and web series Desus & Mero.

== Production ==
=== Development ===
In June 2018, Showtime announced they had ordered a half-hour late night series starring Desus and Mero, to be the network's first late night show ever. Desus and Mero stated that the increased budget would allow the show to have more pre-recorded sketches, a research team, and an upgraded set. They also hired a writer's room with the following writers: Mike Pielocik, Josh Gondelman, Claire Friedman, Ziwe Fumudoh, Robert Kornhauser, and Heben Nigatu.

=== Release ===
The series debuted February 21, 2019. Congresswoman Alexandria Ocasio-Cortez was their first guest. On April 21, 2019, it was announced that Desus & Mero would expand to air two nights per week, on Mondays and Thursdays. On November 21, 2019, the same day as the airing of season one's final episode, Showtime announced the renewal of the show for a second season.

Due to the COVID-19 pandemic, the show went on temporary hiatus, but returned on March 30 in a teleconferencing format from Baker and Martinez's respective homes. In September 2020, the show's Twitter announced that the show had been renewed for a third season, which set to premiere on January 31, 2021.

In August 2021, Showtime renewed the series for a fourth season.

=== Cancellation ===
On July 18, 2022, Showtime confirmed that the show had concluded with its June 23 episode, as the two co-hosts had decided to pursue "separate creative endeavors moving forward".

The move was a surprise to many fans, though some took the news as confirmation of a suspected dispute between the hosts. There were rumors of a behind-the-scenes conflict surrounding the pair's longtime manager, Victor Lopez. Sources alleged that Showtime barred Lopez from attending meetings or tapings of the show after multiple formal complaints of abusive conduct. Baker reportedly supported the decision, while Martinez felt that Lopez deserved their support.

Martinez denied that there was any conflict and described the decision as "a strategy and one that we all agreed on." However, Martinez had also liked posts attributing the split to a rift over Lopez on Twitter.

== Episodes ==
Season	Episodes	Originally released	
Season	Episodes	First released	Last released
1	45	February 21, 2019	November 21, 2019
2	62	February 3, 2020	December 13, 2020
3	58	January 31, 2021	December 16, 2021
4	15	March 10, 2022	June 23, 2022

=== Season 1 (2019) ===
No. overall	No. in season	Title	Illustrious Guest(s)	Original release date	Viewers (millions)
1	1	"Series Premiere, Ballbags"	Alexandria Ocasio-Cortez	February 21, 2019	0.151
2	2	"Talk Your Talk"	Don Cheadle	February 28, 2019	N/A
3	3	"Struggle Jeans"	Vince Staples and John Legend	March 7, 2019	0.056
4	4	"If I Woulda Did It"	Ben Stiller and 2 Chainz	March 14, 2019	0.032
5	5	"Hateful Hairline"	Lupita Nyong'o, Winston Duke and Kirsten Gillibrand	March 21, 2019	0.052
6	6	"You Thought!"	Carmelo Anthony and Jordan Peele	March 28, 2019	N/A
7	7	"Mad Buns"	Issa Rae	April 4, 2019	0.030
8	8	"News Adjacent"	Stacey Abrams and Anna Kendrick	April 11, 2019	0.078
9	9	"Grits Ratio"	Cory Booker	April 18, 2019	N/A
10	10	"Waiting For Julio"	Seth Rogen	May 2, 2019	N/A
11	11	"On Deckington"	Lil Nas X	May 6, 2019	0.041
12	12	"Open Your Third Eye"	Charlize Theron	May 9, 2019	0.029
13	13	"Look At Your Mans"	Wu-Tang Clan	May 13, 2019	0.043
14	14	"Fax"	Bill Hader	May 16, 2019	N/A
15	15	"Jamaican Hockey"	Amy Poehler	May 20, 2019	0.020
16	16	"Royal Baby Newport"	Gabrielle Union	May 23, 2019	0.038
17	17	"Hold That"	Ava DuVernay	May 30, 2019	N/A
18	18	"Lowkey, Stay Down"	Spike Lee	June 3, 2019	N/A
19	19	"Platinum Dad Joke"	Pete Buttigieg	June 6, 2019	N/A
20	20	"Pon'delocke"	Lin-Manuel Miranda	June 10, 2019	N/A
21	21	"Electric Lemonade"	Regina Hall	June 13, 2019	N/A
22	22	"It's Cultural"	ScHoolboy Q	June 17, 2019	N/A
23	23	"Pivot to Alians"	Anthony Anderson	June 20, 2019	N/A
24	24	"Y'All Not Low"	O'Shea Jackson	June 24, 2019	N/A
25	25	"Link in Bio"	Zendaya	June 27, 2019	N/A
26	26	"Bonus Illustriousness"	N/A	July 8, 2019	N/A
27	27	"The Macaroni and Cheese Sound"	Kumail Nanjiani	July 11, 2019	N/A
28	28	"Charcoonery Plate"	Kemba Walker	July 15, 2019	N/A
29	29	"Staring in Ashanti"	Megan Rapinoe	July 18, 2019	N/A
30	30	"Digital Hookah"	Dascha Polanco	July 22, 2019	N/A
31	31	"Drop A Pin"	Common	July 25, 2019	N/A
32	32	"Sightseeing Dog"	Billy Eichner	July 29, 2019	N/A
33	33	"Alien Hook Off"	Anderson Cooper & Andy Cohen	August 1, 2019	N/A
34	34	"It's A Boy"	DaBaby	October 14, 2019	N/A
35	35	"Tech Flex"	Taraji P. Henson	October 17, 2019	N/A
36	36	"Teeth On Layaway"	Ta-Nehisi Coates	October 21, 2019	N/A
37	37	"West Indian Fence"	Gayle King & CC Sabathia	October 24, 2019	N/A
38	38	"The Back Of Your Back"	Bill Burr	October 28, 2019	N/A
39	39	"Un Jokkersteppen"	Bernie Sanders	October 31, 2019	N/A
40	40	"Come Collect Uncle Daryl"	Anna Kendrick	November 4, 2019	N/A
41	41	"Take Your Time Baby"	Kenan Thompson	November 7, 2019	N/A
42	42	"From Deep"	Chris Hayes	November 11, 2019	N/A
43	43	"Grab that Boomer"	Hasan Minhaj	November 14, 2019	N/A
44	44	"That's Larping"	Shea Serrano	November 18, 2019	N/A
45	45	"Dancing Bok Choy"	Chadwick Boseman, Elizabeth Warren	November 21, 2019	N/A

=== Season 2 (2020) ===
No. overall	No. in season	Title	Illustrious Guest(s)	Original release date	Viewers (millions)
46	1	"PJ Boys (Note: Showtime released the extended interview as a standalone episode on February 17th, 2020, giving it an episode number of 90.)"	David Letterman	February 3, 2020	N/A
47	2	"2020 Vision"	Alexandria Ocasio-Cortez	February 6, 2020	N/A
48	3	"Hard To Get A Ticket"	Penn Badgley	February 10, 2020	N/A
49	4	"Su-Su-Sucio"	Lakeith Stanfield	February 13, 2020	N/A
50	5	"Full Body Roll"	Maxine Waters	February 20, 2020	N/A
51	6	"That's A Lotta Rappin'"	John Mulaney	February 24, 2020	N/A
52	7	"Woke Switcheroo"	Killer Mike	February 27, 2020	N/A
53	8	"Whopping Good Time"	Missy Elliott	March 2, 2020	N/A
54	9	"Bare Minimum Ally"	Nick Kroll	March 5, 2020	N/A
55	10	"Dominican Leprechaun"	Wale	March 9, 2020	N/A
56	11	"Big Beach Towel"	Seth Meyers	March 12, 2020	N/A
57	12	"That Rona"	Anthony Fauci	March 30, 2020	N/A
58	13	"Stay At Home Dad Jokes"	John Legend	April 2, 2020	N/A
59	14	"R.O.I. from Nana"	Malcolm Gladwell	April 6, 2020	N/A
60	15	"Van Gogh Album Cut"	Tracee Ellis Ross	April 9, 2020	N/A
61	16	"You Mad Doofy"	Mark Cuban	April 13, 2020	N/A
62	17	"Built-In Gratuity"	Joe Biden	April 16, 2020	N/A
63	18	"Three Nuts and a Possible"	Alicia Keys	April 20, 2020	N/A
64	19	"Dunk on Napoleon"	Issa Rae & Jay Ellis	April 23, 2020	N/A
65	20	"A Caravan of Karens"	José Andrés	April 27, 2020	N/A
66	21	"Bologna Goatee"	Rashida Jones, Alison Roman	April 30, 2020	N/A
67	22	"The Goat's Always For Sale"	Spike Jonze and Beastie Boys	May 4, 2020	N/A
68	23	"Terrifying and Sexy At The Same Time"	Billy Porter	May 7, 2020	N/A
69	24	"The Metaphysical Hypothetical"	Dr. Nina	May 11, 2020	N/A
70	25	"Infobars"	Katie Porter	May 14, 2020	N/A
71	26	"Baline Human"	Gabrielle Union & Dwyane Wade	May 18, 2020	N/A
72	27	"It's Been Asparamanced"	Jesse Williams	May 21, 2020	N/A
73	28	"We Was Wolves"	N/A	May 25, 2020	N/A
74	29	"One Big T-Zone"	Sara Jay, RMR	May 28, 2020	N/A
75	30	"You Are The Jake"	Freddie Gibbs, Jamaal Bowman	July 5, 2020	N/A
76	31	"It Be Your Own Mans"	Jon Stewart, Joey Chestnut	July 9, 2020	N/A
77	32	"Cream of Corona"	Noname	July 12, 2020	N/A
78	33	"Old School Glizzy"	Bubba Wallace, Judd Apatow	July 16, 2020	N/A
79	34	"Different Coastal Work"	Lady A, Don Cheadle	July 19, 2020	N/A
80	35	"Slow My Curve"	Kenny Stills, Eric Andre	July 23, 2020	N/A
81	36	"Bottle Service Cheeks"	Andy Samberg	July 26, 2020	N/A
82	37	"Six Figures In This"	Taylor Rooks	July 30, 2020	N/A
83	38	"Sound It Out"	Stephen A. Smith	August 2, 2020	N/A
84	39	"Ms. Papi"	Usain Bolt	August 6, 2020	N/A
85	40	"Love Your Work"	Cori Bush, Seth Rogen	August 9, 2020	N/A
86	41	"A Dickens of a Time"	Chloe x Halle, Jennifer McLeggan	August 13, 2020	N/A
87	42	"Fully Accredited Institution"	Sue Bird	August 16, 2020	N/A
88	43	"We Invented Sucio"	Jaime Harrison	August 20, 2020	N/A
89	44	"Victoria Cakes"	Saweetie	August 23, 2020	N/A
90	45	"Disloyal To Moisturizer"	Jaden Smith	August 27, 2020	N/A
91	46	"Respect The Eagle"	Kamala Harris	September 13, 2020	N/A
92	47	"Entanglement Eyes"	John David Washington	September 17, 2020	N/A
93	48	"Brunch Boots"	Janelle Monáe	September 20, 2020	N/A
94	49	"Coulda Been An Email"	Big Sean	September 24, 2020	N/A
95	50	"New York Miracle"	Tony Hawk	September 27, 2020	N/A
96	51	"Five Star Baby"	LL Cool J	October 1, 2020	N/A
97	52	"Pandemic Type Beat"	Timbaland & Swizz Beatz	October 4, 2020	N/A
98	53	"Between You And You"	Chika	October 8, 2020	N/A
99	54	"Twelve Months of Papi"	Jason Derulo	October 11, 2020	N/A
100	55	"These Phones Ain't Loyal"	Ethan Hawke	October 15, 2020	N/A
101	56	"Mids Bop"	Yahya Abdul-Mateen II	October 18, 2020	N/A
102	57	"Rookie Draft Day Pants"	Sarah Cooper	October 22, 2020	N/A
103	58	"I'm Butt Nilzy"	HAIM, Borat	October 25, 2020	N/A
104	59	"I Can Eyeball Bushels"	RZA	October 29, 2020	N/A
105	60	"This Is Lighthearted Fun That We Havin' Right Now"	Chris Rock	November 1, 2020	N/A
106	61	"DMFM: The Home of Boom Bap - Special"	Bobbito Garcia & DJ Stretch Armstrong, Roxanne Shante, City Girls, Bun B, Benny the Butcher, Juicy J, A$AP Ferg, Rick Ross, Sheila E, Cam'ron, Busta Rhymes	November 15, 2020	N/A
107	62	"The Obama Interview"	Barack Obama	December 13, 2020	N/A

=== Season 3 (2021) ===
No. overall	No. in season	Title	Illustrious Guest(s)	Original release date	Viewers (millions)
108	1	"Right Off The Rip"	Stacey Abrams	January 31, 2021	N/A
109	2	"Cook-‘em-All"	Freddie Gibbs	February 4, 2021	N/A
110	3	"That’s On Y’all"	Jazmine Sullivan	February 7, 2021	N/A
111	4	"I Smell Broke"	Whoopi Goldberg	February 11, 2021	N/A
112	5	"Passive-Aggressive G.O.A.T."	Zendaya & John David Washington	February 14, 2021	N/A
113	6	"We Be Here, He Be There"	Anthony Mackie	February 18, 2021	N/A
114	7	"Move To Utica"	Ludacris	February 21, 2021	N/A
115	8	"Bird Cousins"	Kelly Rowland	February 25, 2021	N/A
116	9	"The Wild Cranium"	Travis "Taco" Bennett	February 28, 2021	N/A
117	10	"East Coast Reggie"	Ramy Youssef	March 4, 2021	N/A
118	11	"Mad Moist"	Delroy Lindo	March 7, 2021	N/A
119	12	"Don't Come To My Funeral"	Eddie Huang	March 11, 2021	N/A
120	13	"Pipes O'Clock"	Phoebe Bridgers	March 14, 2021	N/A
121	14	"Puff Of Feathers"	Eddie Murphy, Jermaine Fowler	March 18, 2021	N/A
122	15	"My Little Mule"	24kGoldn, Benny the Butcher	March 21, 2021	N/A
123	16	"L Machine"	Kenan Thompson	March 25, 2021	N/A
124	17	"Future Hats"	Glenn Close	April 8, 2021	N/A
125	18	"Half A Lip"	Andra Day	April 11, 2021	N/A
126	19	"Weekend Dad"	Miguel	April 15, 2021	N/A
127	20	"Twerking For No One"	J Balvin, Travon Free	April 18, 2021	N/A
128	21	"The Cheek Detective"	Issa Rae	April 22, 2021	N/A
129	22	"The Platypus Of Salads"	Demi Lovato	April 25, 2021	N/A
130	23	"Yo Free Knowledge"	Julian Edelman	April 29, 2021	N/A
131	24	"One Wood"	Taylour Paige	May 2, 2021	N/A
132	25	"Wall Of Zeppoles"	Yo-yo Ma, Ziwe Fumudoh	May 6, 2021	N/A
133	26	"Sturdy Limbs"	Lil Nas X	June 20, 2021	N/A
134	27	"Watermarked X-Rays"	Yara Shahidi	June 24, 2021	N/A
135	28	"Mid-Nup"	Don Cheadle	June 27, 2021	N/A
136	29	"Full Body Toppy"	Lil Dicky & GaTa, Migos	July 1, 2021	N/A
137	30	"Mad Habit"	Benny Blanco	July 8, 2021	N/A
138	31	"Yearly Beret Budget"	Vince Staples	July 11, 2021	N/A
139	32	"Ketchup & Oysters"	Barry Jenkins	July 15, 2021	N/A
140	33	"Sea Of Uncles"	Cynthia Erivo, Andrew Callaghan	July 18, 2021	N/A
141	34	"Bang Your Little Hammer"	H.E.R.	July 22, 2021	N/A
142	35	"Staying In The Drafts"	Bobby Shmurda	July 25, 2021	N/A
143	36	"Space Law"	Matt Damon	July 29, 2021	N/A
144	37	"Yielding To Rebrinners"	Zazie Beetz	August 1, 2021	N/A
145	38	"AKA Harry Nugs"	Eric Andre	August 5, 2021	N/A
146	39	"Throw The Mid"	Idris Elba	August 8, 2021	N/A
147	40	"Scamming Fee"	Marlon Wayans	August 12, 2021	N/A
148	41	"Original Hairline"	Chance the Rapper	August 15, 2021	N/A
149	42	"Wild Venomous"	John Turturro	August 19, 2021	N/A
150	43	"It Might Be Reggaeton"	Nas	October 17, 2021	N/A
151	44	"Not Guilty, Your Majesty"	Lewis Hamilton	October 21, 2021	N/A
152	45	"Wild Romantical"	Baby Keem	October 24, 2021	N/A
153	46	"African American Chlorophyll"	Dave Grohl	October 28, 2021	N/A
154	47	"Prayer Warriors Assemble"	Yvonne Orji	October 31, 2021	N/A
155	48	"Toddler Level Confidence"	ASAP Rocky	November 4, 2021	N/A
156	49	"Clown-Like Actions"	Cordae	November 7, 2021	N/A
157	50	"West Indian Dad Feet"	Dwayne Johnson	November 11, 2021	N/A
158	51	"Ovary Majora"	Keke Palmer	November 14, 2021	N/A
159	52	"Just Asking Questions"	Jeff Goldblum	November 18, 2021	N/A
160	53	"Co-Potatoing"	Kevin Hart	November 21, 2021	N/A
161	54	"A Very Roastable Shirt"	Tracy Morgan	December 2, 2021	N/A
162	55	"Steamed Shirt"	French Montana	December 5, 2021	N/A
163	56	"Sushi Hot Dogs"	Sandra Bullock	December 9, 2021	N/A
164	57	"110% Polyester"	Michael B. Jordan	December 12, 2021	N/A
165	58	"Bong, Done, Finito"	Keanu Reeves & Carrie-Anne Moss	December 16, 2021	N/A

=== Season 4 (2022) ===
No. overall	No. in season	Title	Illustrious Guest(s)	Original release date	Viewers (millions)
166	1	"Plain Slice"	Denzel Washington	March 10, 2022	N/A
167	2	"It's Gonna Hit"	Tom Holland & Mark Wahlberg	March 24, 2022	N/A
168	3	"Grab Your Bags"	Samuel L. Jackson	March 31, 2022	N/A
169	4	"That's Brioche"	Pusha T	April 7, 2022	N/A
170	5	"Big Hater Energy"	Michelle Yeoh	April 14, 2022	N/A
171	6	"Lucite Situation"	Damson Idris	April 21, 2022	N/A
172	7	"Cheater Belly"	Earl Sweatshirt	April 28, 2022	N/A
173	8	"Bad Bills"	Jon Bernthal	May 5, 2022	N/A
174	9	"Rum On Their Gums"	Chris Smalls	May 12, 2022	N/A
175	10	"It's A Party Now"	Quinta Brunson	May 19, 2022	N/A
176	11	"Bottles, Bottles, Bottles"	Jerrod Carmichael	May 26, 2022	N/A
177	12	"Auto-Clapping"	Sam Jay	June 2, 2022	N/A
178	13	"Say No To The Mustache"	Wanda Sykes	June 9, 2022	N/A
179	14	"Science And Felonies"	Jeff Bridges, Seth Meyers	June 16, 2022	N/A
180	15	"Coulda Been A Hero"	Derek Jeter, Mina Kimes	June 23, 2022	N/A

== Critical reception ==
Desus & Mero received positive reviews. Daniel D'addario wrote for Variety magazine: "Their perspective, in a sea of late-night shows all modeled on John Oliver's studiousness, feels genuinely new. And Desus and Mero showed enough comic resourcefulness, and enough enthusiasm and warmth, throughout their broadcast to make clear it's worth watching no matter who guests." Writing for Entertainment Weekly, Kristen Baldwin gave the show a B+ and stated in the review: "The initial outing revealed a few weaknesses in the new format, but it retained the humor, point of view, and boisterous energy that makes Desus and Mero an essential late-night addition." Marc Silver wrote for The Washington Post, "With their own wit and the help of veterans from the Stephen Colbert and John Oliver late-night shows, they bring a fresh and funny take and add all-too-rarely heard Black and Latino perspectives."

== Accolades ==
Hosts Desus and Mero received a 2019 Webby Special Achievement Award for their talk show.

== Awards and nominations ==
Year	Award	Category	Nominee	Result	Ref.
2019	TCA Awards	Outstanding Achievement in Variety, Talk, or Sketch	Desus & Mero	Nominated	
2020	Critics' Choice Awards	Best Talk Show	Desus & Mero	Nominated	
2021	Critics' Choice Awards	Best Talk Show	Desus & Mero	Nominated	
2021	TCA Awards	Outstanding Achievement in Variety, Talk, or Sketch	Desus & Mero	Nominated	
2021	NAACP Image Awards	Outstanding News/Information (Series or Special) (for "The Obama Interview")	Desus & Mero	Nominated	
2021	Writers Guild of America Awards	Comedy/Variety Talk Series	Daniel Baker, Claire Friedman, Ziwerekoru Fumudoh, Josh Gondelman, Robert Kornhauser, Joel Martinez, Heben Nigatu, Mike Pielocik, and Julia Young; Showtime	Won	
2022	Critics' Choice Awards	Best Talk Show	Desus & Mero	Pending	
