= Kid Fury =

American YouTuber and podcaster

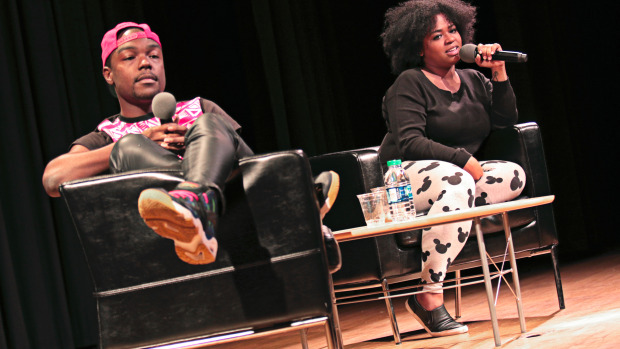
- Fury with co-host Crissle West at a live taping of The Read podcast
- Born: Gregory A. Smith; November 24, 1987 (age 38); Miami, Florida
- Occupations: YouTube vlogger; podcaster; comedian; writer
- Years active: 2009–present
- Known for: The Read

Gregory A. Smith (born November 24, 1987), known professionally as Kid Fury, is an American YouTube vlogger, comedian, and writer. He is best known as the co-host of podcast The Read, with Crissle West.

== Early life ==
Kid Fury was born and raised in Miami, Florida, where his parents emigrated from Jamaica. He has two younger brothers. He enjoyed comedy from a young age and especially liked In Living Color, Martin and Moesha.

== Career ==
=== YouTube vlogs ===
Kid Fury launched a YouTube channel in 2010 where he hosted a vlog series called Furious Thoughts. At the time of the launch he also had a comedy blog and created the YouTube account to drive traffic to his blog. His videos featured comedic, unfiltered takes on pop culture and his real life and attracted a large, diverse audience. The New York Observer called him "Black Twitter's Kingmaker", and Ebony's Jamilah Lemieux compared him to Eddie Murphy.

Kid Fury moved to New York City in 2012. As of July 2013, his videos had over 10 million views. In 2016, he told NBC: "As a person of color and gay man, it is three times as hard to get opportunities in this industry, so I am doing my best to create my own...I'm building my business instead of waiting for others to give me the keys."

=== The Read ===
In 2011, Kid Fury met future collaborator Crissle West, who later moved to New York City in 2013. Chris Morrow approached Fury about doing a podcast with Morrow's then-startup podcasting company, the Loud Speakers Network. Fury asked West to join him and they named the podcast The Read. As of January 2019, The Read was averaging 400,000 listeners per episode. In 2019, the podcast's television adaptation, The Read with Kid Fury and Crissle West, premiered on Fuse.

=== Television work ===
In 2016, Kid Fury put on a live version of his show that consisted largely of stand-up comedy, called "Furious Thoughts Live". He also appeared as a supporting character in the second season of Dear White People.

In July 2018, it was announced that Kid Fury was developing a television show for HBO with executive producer Lena Waithe. The project is described as a "surreal dark comedy" that will follow a gay Black man in his twenties, navigating life in New York City with depression. Kid Fury met producer Chloe Pisello of Avalon Television, who enjoyed the pitch and helped him shop the show around to several networks. Eventually, they signed a deal with HBO.

Kid Fury was a staff writer for the Miami-set HBO Max series Rap Sh!t. He also appeared in two episodes of the show's first season.

== Personal life ==
Fury is openly gay. In an interview with HuffPost, he stated, "I want people to understand that being black and gay is so different than just being gay...Black women get overlooked in the fight for women all of the time, so there's I think a similar thing that happens in the gay community with black gays."

He is noted for advocating for Missy Elliott to receive MTV's VMA Michael Jackson Video Vanguard Award on The Read. Elliott received the award in 2019 and thanked Kid Fury and West for drumming up support during her acceptance speech.

== Accolades ==
Year	Award	Category	Nominee(s)	Result	Ref.
2014	Shorty Awards	Best YouTube Star	Himself	Won	
2014	Black Weblog Awards	Best Podcast	The Read	Won	
2018	BET Social Awards	Best Podcast	The Read	Nominated	
2019	iHeartRadio Podcast Awards	Best Multi-Cultural Podcast	The Read	Nominated	
2020	iHeartRadio Podcast Awards	Best Podcast of the Year	The Read	Nominated	
2020	iHeartRadio Podcast Awards	Best Comedy Podcast	The Read	Nominated	
2020	Shorty Awards	Best Podcasters	Kid Fury and Crissle	Nominated	
2021	iHeartRadio Podcast Awards	Best Comedy Podcast	The Read	Won	
2021	iHeartRadio Podcast Awards	Best Pop Culture Podcast	The Read	Nominated	
2022	Queerty Awards	Best Podcast	The Read	Nominated	
2023	NAACP Image Awards	Outstanding Arts and Entertainment Podcast	The Read	Nominated	
2024	Queerty Awards	Best Comic	Himself	Nominated	
2024	AAMBC Literary Awards	Podcast of the Year	The Read	Nominated	
2026	GLAAD Media Award	Outstanding Podcast	The Read	Nominated	
