= The Read =

Pop culture podcast

- Format: Popular culture podcast
- Language: English

Creative team
- Created by: Kid Fury; Crissle West

Cast and voices
- Hosted by: Kid Fury; Crissle West

Production
- Length: 60 - 180 minutes

Publication
- No. of episodes: 500+
- Original release: March 4, 2013 - Present
- Provider: Loud Speakers Network

Related
- Website: thisistheread.com

The Read is a weekly pop culture podcast. One of several podcasts affiliated with the Loud Speakers Network, The Read is hosted by American comedians Kid Fury and Crissle West and based in New York City.

== History ==
Prior to starting The Read, Kid Fury became popular online through his YouTube stand-up series Furious Thoughts and met co-host Crissle West through Twitter, where the two bonded and Fury asked West to start a podcast together.

The first episode of The Read was released on March 4, 2013. The Read is distributed via the iTunes Store, iHeartRadio Talk, SoundCloud, Spotify, and Stitcher. On iTunes, the podcast peaked at number three in the "New and Noteworthy" section charts and at number one in the comedy section charts. As of 2019, the podcast had over 85 million listens around the world, and received over 1.5 million unique listens every month. Fury and West have hosted several live shows for The Read, including one at the Essence Festival in 2018, where they became the first podcast to be a headlining act.

In 2019, Missy Elliott was awarded the MTV Michael Jackson Video Vanguard Award, where she thanked Kid Fury and Crissle for helping to make it happen.

In 2021, it was announced that Issa Rae's audio company Raedio signed a record deal with The Read to produce a comedy album with pop culture commentary from Kid Fury and Crissle and music from up and coming recording artists.

== Format ==
During podcast episodes, Kid Fury and West discuss and analyze pop culture and current events. The podcast's format has five sections:

1. Black Excellence
2. Hot Tops, (previously known as Sick Sad World, Hot Topics, Shade in Full, and Bitch, You Guessed It) consists of the hosts discussing entertainment news from the week.
3. "Kid Fury's SPORTS SHORTS!" This segment, introduced in 2020, is not a consistent bit and features Kid Fury passionately describing sports news and culture with varying degrees of accuracy.
4. Listener Letters (the segment is changed to Listener Questions when done during a live show), where the hosts read emails sent in from listeners and offer advice.
5. Crissle's Couch, where West shares some of the wisdom she has learned from her mental health therapist. This segment was added to the show in July 2018 but does not appear every week.
6. The Read, where Kid Fury and West "read" (African American gay slang for giving one's harsh opinion which originated in the 1980s) a person or topic.

== Television show ==
On March 13, 2019, it was announced that Fuse had greenlit a variety/talk show based on The Read, titled The Read with Kid Fury and Crissle West. Kid Fury and West served as executive producers, as did Chloe Pisello, David Martin, Jon Thoday, and Richard Allen-Turner.

The show premiered on October 11, 2019, on Fuse.

== Reception ==
=== Critical reception ===
Tre'vell Anderson of Out called The Read "Black queer excellence", writing, "The pair consistently, and quite remarkably, have crafted a show that is more than just a pop culture recap, deftly melding together conversations about politics, social justice, the importance of therapy, career advice, and self-help." Writing for Ebony, Elizabeth Aguirre called the podcast "so unapologetically Black it hurts" and wrote, "Hosts Kid Fury and Crissle start off innocently enough, but by the end of the show, the duo will have you rolling in your seat."

HuffPost's Taryn Finley referred to The Read as "a fun, slightly raunchy, expletive-filled, brutally honest podcast that doubles as a safe space for black people", and stated that, with The Read, Fury and West "made a definitive mark" and "have helped usher in a wave of black podcasters after them". For The Guardian, Lilah Raptopoulos wrote in 2014 that "[Fury and West's] is a casual but energising voice in the podcast world," adding, "The podcast world is one dominated by straight white male comedians reaching middle age. Kid Fury and Crissle are black, gay, young and cool. Their perspective is more sensitive to race, sexual identity and the minority experience than any other podcast that exists right now."

=== Accolades ===
Year	Award	Category	Nominee(s)	Result	Ref.
2014	Black Weblog Awards	Best Podcast	The Read	Won	
2019	iHeartRadio Podcast Awards	Best Multi-Cultural Podcast	The Read	Nominated	
2020	iHeartRadio Podcast Awards	Best Podcast of the Year	The Read	Nominated	
2020	iHeartRadio Podcast Awards	Best Comedy Podcast	The Read	Nominated	
2020	Shorty Awards	Best Podcasters	Kid Fury and Crissle	Nominated	
2021	iHeartRadio Podcast Awards	Best Comedy Podcast	The Read	Won	
2021	iHeartRadio Podcast Awards	Best Pop Culture Podcast	The Read	Nominated	
2022	Queerty Awards	Best Podcast	The Read	Nominated	
2023	NAACP Image Awards	Outstanding Arts and Entertainment Podcast	The Read	Nominated	
2024	AAMBC Literary Awards	Podcast of the Year	The Read	Nominated	
2026	GLAAD Media Award	Outstanding Podcast	The Read	Nominated	
