= The Kid Mero =

Dominican-American writer and comedian (born 1983)

- The Kid Mero in 2025
- Born: Joel Armogasto Martinez; May 15, 1983 (age 43); New York City, U.S.
- Notable work: Desus vs. Mero; Bodega Boys; Joking Off; Guy Code; Desus & Mero (2016–18); Desus & Mero (2019); 7PM in Brooklyn with Carmelo Anthony & the Kid Mero (2024–present)
- Spouse: Heather Martinez
- Children: 4

Comedy career
- Years active: 2010–present
- Medium: Television; Podcast; YouTube
- Genres: Observational comedy; Political satire

Joel Armogasto Martinez (born May 15, 1983), professionally known as the Kid Mero, is a Dominican-American writer, comedian, television host, actor, and internet personality. He rose to prominence alongside fellow Bronx native Desus Nice with their Complex TV 46-episode podcast Desus vs. Mero, which first premiered on December 18, 2013. He was a cast member of Guy Code with Desus Nice. He was the co-host of Viceland's Desus & Mero talk show alongside Desus until June 2018, and co-hosted Desus & Mero which premiered on February 21, 2019, on Showtime.

== Early life ==
Martinez was born in Washington Heights, Manhattan to Dominican immigrant parents. The Martinez family moved to the Bronx when he was young, and lived in a number of neighborhoods there; while Martinez mostly grew up in Tremont, he also spent time in Throggs Neck, Kingsbridge, Mount Eden, and Belmont, among other neighborhoods.

Martinez realized he was talented at comedy from a young age but was not particularly interested in televised comedy or stand-up comedians growing up. He attended P.S. 072 Dr. William Dorney, I.S. 117 Joseph H. Wade Intermediate School, and Monsignor Scanlan High School, from which he was expelled in ninth grade, before graduating from DeWitt Clinton High School. He then studied at Bronx Community College before briefly attending Hunter College, studying to be a science teacher while working as a teacher's assistant.

Martinez is Afro-Latino and grew up speaking Spanish. His father and uncle wanted to name him "Ramiro," but they were overruled by his mother. Nevertheless, his dad and uncle referred to him as "Ramiro" growing up, and when Martinez got into graffiti, he adopted the tag name "Miro," which he eventually changed to "Mero" because he thought it looked better.

== Career ==
Mero previously worked as a paraprofessional at I.S. 117, his alma mater.

He began writing for Vice's music platform Noisey in 2012 with his first article published on November 14, 2012 – a review of Canadian electronic music duo Crystal Castles' album III. In total, he wrote 69 articles for Noisey between November 2012 and March 2014, most of which were album and mixtape reviews, and all written in caps lock.

In September 2014, Mero (with assistance) broke the world record for kazoo solo.

In December 2014, MTV announced that the Kid Mero and Desus Nice would be joining the cast of Guy Code for season 5, along with 11 other new cast members. They appeared on the first episode of season 5, which was originally aired on January 14, 2015.

On August 30, 2016, Viceland announced Desus & Mero which premiered on October 17, 2016. The half-hour show ran Monday-Thursday and ended on June 28, 2018. Mero most recently co-hosted Desus & Mero which premiered on February 21, 2019, on Showtime.

In 2023, Mero started two podcasts: Victory Light, and 7 PM in Brooklyn, the latter with Carmelo Anthony.

In January 2026, Mero became the new morning show host on Hot 97.

In February 2026, Mero started a podcast with Joez McFly from Jomboy Media titled Total Baseball which covered the 2026 World Baseball Classic.

== Personal life ==
Mero lives in Fair Lawn, New Jersey and is married to Heather Martinez, a teacher from New Jersey. The pair have four children: three boys and a girl. Heather is Jewish, and the pair are raising their children in the faith.

== Filmography ==
Year	Title	Role	Notes
2013–2014	Desus vs. Mero	Himself	With Desus Nice
2015	Guy Code	Himself	With Desus Nice
2015	Joking Off	Himself	With Desus Nice
2015–2022	Bodega Boys	Himself	With Desus Nice
2015	Uncommon Sense	Himself	With Desus Nice
2015	Wild 'N Out	Himself	With Desus Nice
TBD	New York Undercover: The BX Chronicles	Eddie Torres	With Desus Nice
2016–2018	Desus & Mero	Himself	With Desus Nice
2017	Neo Yokio	Lexy (voice)	With Desus Nice
2019–2022	Desus & Mero	Himself	With Desus Nice
2019	Star vs. the Forces of Evil	Needles (voice)	Episode: "Jannanigans"
2020	Vampires vs. the Bronx	Tony	Bodega Owner
2021	In the Heights	DJ	Voice cameo
2022	The Captain	Himself	Sports documentary
2024–2025	Primos	Tio Diego Perez (voice)	Recurring role
2024	Hamster & Gretel	Luis Demo (voice)	Episode: "Lair Necessities"
