= Guy Code =

Television series

- Genre: Reality
- Created by: Ryan Ling
- Directed by: Andrew Stuckey
- Country of origin: United States
- Original language: English
- No. of seasons: 5
- No. of episodes: 63

Production
- Executive producers: Darin Byrne; Paul Ricci; Ryan Ling
- Running time: 20 to 23 minutes
- Production company: Viacom Media Networks

Original release
- Network: MTV2
- Release: November 15, 2011 – March 26, 2015

Related
- Girl Code; Guy Court; Girl Code Live; Guy Code vs. Girl Code; Teen Code

Guy Code is an American reality comedy television series on MTV2. The series debuted on November 15, 2011, and features various pop culture entertainers, top comics, athletes, and specialized experts who tell the story of the special code of conduct that exists between men.

On September 26, 2012, MTV2 announced that series' second season delivered the highest-rated and most-watched original series in MTV2 history.

MTV launched the Guy Code Blog in July 2012, right before the series' second season began. Maintained by head editor, Ryan McKee, and associate editor, Marty Beckerman, the daily blog acts as a supplement to the series. They published humorous articles and original videos that follow Guy Code's topics and tone as well as cover the series and its cast members.

A spinoff series, Girl Code, debuted on MTV on April 23, 2013. It later moved to Snapchat Discover via MTV. It was announced on April 25, 2013, that two additional spin-offs were in production: The Hook-Up, a dating show that was to be hosted by Andrew Schulz from Guy Code but never made it to series; and Guy Court, a faux courtroom hearing in which personalities judged cases of "code violations". Guy Court premiered on November 6, 2013. A spinoff, Guy Code vs. Girl Code, premiered in 2016 for one season on MTV2. In 2019, Teen Code launched on Snapchat Discover via MTV. In September 2020, MTV aired a one-time special called 2020 Code about the year 2020 featuring Code alum.

On July 21, 2013, MTV and MTV2 aired an hour-long special titled Guy Code Honors that focuses on how guys love sci-fi, thrillers and fantasy action. It also includes titles from movies, shows, actors and superheroes broke or enforced the guy code. Guy Code Honors features some of the cast of Guy Code as well as celebrities such as Tyler Posey, Vin Diesel, and Rob Kazinsky. It was filmed July 18, 2013, at Comic-Con.

It was announced on September 23, 2013, that MTV2 had greenlit a fourth season of Guy Code. Season four premiered on April 16, 2014. Season five, the last season aired, began January 14, 2015.

== Cast ==
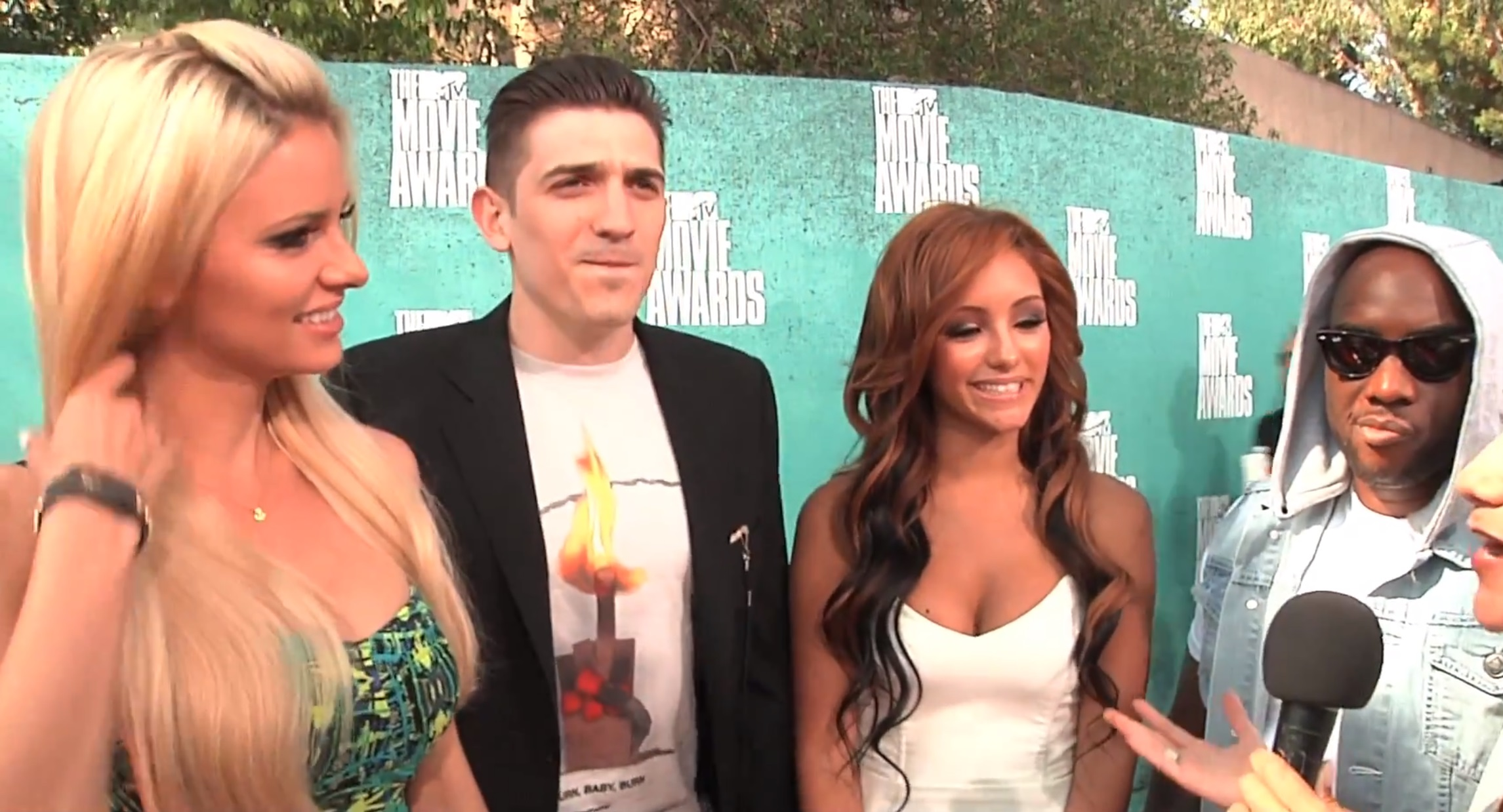
The cast of Guy Code interviewed at the MTV Movie Awards 2012. L to R: April Rose, Andrew Schulz, Melanie Iglesias, Charlamagne Tha God.

- Andrew Schulz (season 1–5)
- April Rose(season 1–4)
- Ariel Meredith (season 4–5)
- Akaash Singh (season 5)
- Big Black (seasons 1–2)
- Charlamagne Tha God (season 1–5)
- Chris Distefano (season 2–5)
- Dan Soder (season 3–5)
- Fahim Anwar (season 5)
- Damien Lemon (season 1–5)
- David Ebert (season 5)
- Donnell Rawlings (season 1–5)
- Sami El Kassmi (season 5)
- Jermaine Fowler (season 3–5)
- Jordan Carlos (season 1–5)
- Nicholas Albrecht (season 3–5)
- Lil Duval (season 1–5)
- Jon Gabrus (season 1–5)
- Lisa Ramos (season 2–4)
- Melanie Iglesias (season 1–4)
- Pete Davidson (season 3–4)
- Tiffany Luu (season 3)
- Timothy DeLaGhetto (season 5)
- Alesha Renee (seasons 1–2)
- Julian McCullough (seasons 1–2, 4–5)
- Dan St. Germain (season 1)
- Vinny Guadagnino (seasons 1–2)
- The Kid Mero (season 5)
- Desus Nice (season 5)
- Brian Loughlin (season 1)

=== Guest appearances ===
- Kevin Hart
- Young Jeezy
- 2 Chainz
- CeeLo Green
- The Game
- Mac Miller
- Pusha T
- Swizz Beatz
- Joe Budden
- Wiz Khalifa
- Nelly
- Kendrick Lamar
- Nina Agdal
- Rae Sremmurd

== Episodes ==
=== Series overview ===
Season	Episodes	Originally released	
Season	Episodes	First released	Last released
1	12	November 16, 2011	April 10, 2012
2	15	July 10, 2012	October 8, 2012
3	12	January 15, 2013	April 2, 2013
4	12	April 16, 2014	June 25, 2014
5	12	January 14, 2015	March 25, 2015

=== Season 1 (2011–12) ===
No. overall	No. in season	Title	Original release date
1	1	"Manscaping, Sexting, Bottle Service and Camping."	November 15, 2011
2	2	"Dancing, Bathroom Etiquette, Exercise and The Morning After."	November 22, 2011
3	3	"Crying, Drinking like a Man, Rules of Karaoke and Hygiene."	November 29, 2011
4	4	"Avoiding the Friend Zone, Social Networks, Cars and Contraception."	December 6, 2011
5	5	"Bachelor Pads, Strip Clubs, Long Distance Relationships and Penis Size."	December 13, 2011
6	6	"Holiday Parties, Gift-giving and New Year's Eve."	December 20, 2011
7	7	"Cheating, Ideal Wingman, Cookin 101 and Best Friend's Ex."	December 20, 2011
8	8	"Tattoos, Girlfriends, Diets and Getting Your Girlfriend into Sports."	December 27, 2011
9	9	"Drugs, Money, Ex-Girlfriends and Competitiveness."	January 3, 2012
10	10	"Masturbating, Fighting, Perfect Roommate and Break-ups."	January 10, 2012
11	11	"Getting Freaky, Perfect Pregame, Nicknames and Jobs."	January 17, 2012
12	12	"Guy Code Spring Break Survival Guide."	April 10, 2012

=== Season 2 (2012) ===
No. overall	No. in season	Title	Original release date
13	1	"Porn, being broke, jealousy and having a crush."	July 10, 2012
14	2	"Farting, foreplay, lying, and bachelor parties."	July 17, 2012
15	3	"One-night stands, racism and going abroad."	July 24, 2012
16	4	"Paying for sex, being a player, road trips and sisters."	July 31, 2012
17	5	"Pregnancy scares, the code to BBQs, astrology, and hosting a friend in town."	August 7, 2012
18	6	"STDs, video games, cops and weddings."	August 14, 2012
19	7	"Stress, how to work a rebound, friends and fantasy sports."	August 20, 2012
20	8	"Friends with benefits, rejection, shopping and freshman year."	August 21, 2012
21	9	"Piercings, gossip, brothers, and moving in with your lady."	August 27, 2012
22	10	"Online dating, going to the doctor and tailgating."	September 3, 2012
23	11	"Haters, balding, being single, and meeting your girlfriend's parents."	September 10, 2012
24	12	"Flirting, revenge, gambling, and owning a pet."	September 17, 2012
25	13	"Guy Code to Hooking Up."	September 24, 2012
26	14	"Guy Code to the Night Out."	October 1, 2012
27	15	"Guy Code to Manscaping and Everything Else."	October 8, 2012

=== Season 3 (2013) ===
No. overall	No. in season	Title	Original release date
28	1	"Boners, getting engaged, being fat, house parties."	January 15, 2013
29	2	"Virginity, gay, birthdays, being sick."	January 22, 2013
30	3	"Cock blocking, insecurity, texting, Super Bowl parties."	January 29, 2013
31	4	"Body odor, rivalry, first dates, religion. The guys compete in the Hangover Olympics."	February 5, 2013
32	5	"PMS, Valentine's Day, being stoned, apologizing."	February 12, 2013
33	6	"Puberty, Interviewing, Being Whipped, Sleeping."	February 19, 2013
34	7	"New relationships, bar etiquette, having a kid, being a nerd."	February 26, 2013
35	8	"Your boy's girlfriend, wine, kissing, maturity."	March 5, 2013
36	9	"PDA, being scared, dealing with her friends, moms."	March 12, 2013
37	10	"Flying, spicing things up, teachers, funerals."	March 19, 2013
38	11	"Prom, taking a break, going to the game, moving back in."	March 26, 2013
39	12	"Dads, falling in love, guys' night out, being embarrassed."	April 2, 2013

=== Season 4 (2014) ===
No. overall	No. in season	Title	Original release date
40	1	"Closing, pooping, and an update on the gym"	April 16, 2014
41	2	"21st birthdays, platonic girlfriends, and a manscaping update"	April 23, 2014
42	3	"Having sex, male bonding, and a roommates update"	April 30, 2014
43	4	"Heartbreak, balls, and a life online update"	May 7, 2014
44	5	"Boobs, snooping, and a dancing update"	May 14, 2014
45	6	"Puking, guilt, and a bathroom update"	May 21, 2014
46	7	"Style, girls with boyfriends, and a drinking update"	May 28, 2014
47	8	"Being faithful, favors, and a competing update"	June 4, 2014
48	9	"Hangovers, concerts, and a sexting update"	June 11, 2014
49	10	"Senior year, body image, and a fighting update"	June 18, 2014
50	11	"Peer pressure, unemployment, and an update on exes"	June 25, 2014
51	12	"Getting older, art, and a morning after update"	June 25, 2014

=== Season 5 (2015) ===
No. overall	No. in season	Title	Original release date
52	1	"Dry Spell, porn 2.0, crying"	January 14, 2015
53	2	"Setting the mood, bullsh***ing, surprises"	January 21, 2015
54	3	"Liquor, butts, listening"	January 28, 2015
55	4	"Being funny, laughing, making fun, tickling"	February 4, 2015
56	5	"Being offensive, commitment, being crazy"	February 11, 2015
57	6	"Having gas, breaking up 2.0, our first time"	February 18, 2015
58	7	"Being Dumb, being a gentleman, dtr"	February 19, 2015
59	8	"Girlfriends 2.0, getting your license, online dating"	February 28, 2015
60	9	"Settling, being busy, kissing"	March 5, 2015
61	10	"Playing the field, being tough, boobs"	March 12, 2015
62	11	"Reputation, penises 2.0, baggage"	March 19, 2015
63	12	"Hot girls - Types, meeting them, sex, foreplay"	March 26, 2015

=== Specials ===
Title	Original release date
"Guy Code Honors"	July 21, 2013
A one-hour special that gave out awards for categories such as Best Wingman, Bad Ass Chick, and Most Guy Code Moment. Also featured performances by New Politics and Dillon Francis.

== See also ==
- Bro Code
- Fratire
