= Combat Jack =

American lawyer (1969–2017)

- Born: Reginald Joseph Ossé; July 8, 1969; Brooklyn, New York, U.S.
- Died: December 20, 2017 (aged 48); Brooklyn, New York, U.S.
- Education: Cornell University; Georgetown University (JD)
- Occupations: Attorney; executive; journalist; editor; podcaster
- Years active: 1989–2017
- Children: 4, including Chi Ossé

Reginald Joseph Ossé (July 8, 1969 – December 20, 2017), known professionally as Combat Jack, was a Haitian-American hip hop music attorney, executive, journalist, editor and podcaster. He was the former managing editor of The Source. He was the host of the podcast The Combat Jack Show and founding partner of the Loud Speakers Network. He was also the host of the Complex TV show version of The Combat Jack Show podcast.

== Career ==
A first-generation Haitian-American, Ossé was born in Brooklyn, New York on July 8, 1969, and graduated from Cornell University. There at the university, he became a member of Kappa Xi chapter of Phi Beta Sigma fraternity. He later received his law degree from Georgetown University Law Center. He represented hip-hop producers and entertainers, such as Jay-Z, Damon Dash, Roc-a-fella Records, DJ Clark Kent, Nice & Smooth, Capone-N-Noreaga, Deric "D. Dot" Angelettie, Ski Beatz, and others, starting from an internship in legal affairs for Def Jam Recordings in 1989. After 12 years of practicing law in the music industry, he retired and wrote Bling, a book documenting hip-hop's history and fascination with jewelry. He also served as the Vice President of Audio/Music DVD at MTV Networks and later managing editor of The Source. Then with Gimlet Media, a podcast network, he hosted a show called Mogul about the life and death of hip hop executive Chris Lighty.

=== The Combat Jack Show ===
Ossé chose the name Combat Jack from the book Generation Kill, initially using it as a pseudonym for commenting on Missouri-based blogger Byron Crawford's site. In August 2010, he launched a podcast by the same name, first aired on PNC Radio. The internet radio show was dedicated to hip hop discussions and interviews. Combat Jack's co-hosts include Dallas Penn, Premium Pete, DJ Benhameen, AKing and Just Blaze.

In 2013, The Combat Jack Show became the flagship of a network of podcasts founded by Ossé known as the Loud Speakers Network, which also includes The Read, hosted by Kid Fury and Crissle, The Brilliant Idiots, and FanBros, hosted by DJ Benhameen.

Over his life, Ossé also blogged for XXL magazine, as well as his own website.

== Death ==
Combat Jack died at a hospital from colon cancer in Brooklyn on the morning of December 20, 2017, two months after announcing he had been diagnosed with the cancer.
