= Uncommon Sense with Charlamagne =

TV talk show

Uncommon Sense with Charlamagne is a talk show that aired weekly on MTV2 hosted by on-air personality Charlamagne Tha God. Uncommon Sense with Charlamagne featured a panel of guests who discussed current events in politics and the media. The show ran for three years for a total of 41 episodes starting in 2015.
