= Lights Out with David Spade =

American late-night talk show

- Genre: Late-night talk show
- Presented by: David Spade
- Country of origin: United States
- Original language: English
- No. of seasons: 1
- No. of episodes: 107

Production
- Executive producers: Tom Brunelle; Marc Gurvitz; Alex Murray; David Spade; Brad Wollack; Sean O'Connor
- Running time: 22 minutes
- Production companies: Desert Rat; Brillstein Entertainment Partners; Free 90 Media

Original release
- Network: Comedy Central
- Release: July 29, 2019 – March 12, 2020

Lights Out with David Spade is an American late-night talk show that was hosted by David Spade. Premiering on Comedy Central on July 29, 2019, the series featured discussions on popular culture topics between Spade and a rotating panel of guest comedians, as well as other filmed segments. It ended on March 12, 2020.

== History ==
The series was scheduled as a lead-out for The Daily Show; since the conclusion of The Colbert Report, the timeslot had seen several short-lived attempts at Daily Show spin-offs focusing on other cast members, such as The Nightly Show with Larry Wilmore and The Opposition with Jordan Klepper, which both faced low viewership.

Lights Out marked the first Comedy Central program in the 11:30 timeslot to not be a news comedy program or be hosted by an alumnus of The Daily Show. Network president Kent Alterman argued that viewers were being fatigued by the extensive focus on politics and the Trump administration on other late night shows, with Spade saying that his show would focus more on "cultural events and some Hollywood stuff, [and] weird stories in the news" rather than primarily focus on political humor.

On August 14, 2019, Spade brought in comedian Lara Beitz to do the first stand-up spot on the show after watching her perform in Los Angeles, which took the place of his closing monologue. He later had her on as a guest, and as a correspondent. Other deviations from the regular format of the show included full show interviews with Adam Sandler and Jim Carrey.

In March 2020, production was halted due to the COVID-19 pandemic. On April 3, 2020, Comedy Central announced that they would not renew Lights Out, but that it was open to selling the show to another network; the program had only been able to retain roughly half of its audience from The Daily Show (which, as a partial replacement, began producing expanded 45-minute episodes beginning April 27).

== Episodes ==
=== 2019 ===
==== July/August ====
No.	Original air date	Guest(s)
1	July 29, 2019	Neal Brennan, Erik Griffin, Whitney Cummings
2	July 30, 2019	Theo Von, Jen Kirkman, Candice Thompson
3	July 31, 2019	Jim Jefferies, Steve Byrne, Kaley Cuoco
4	August 1, 2019	Dana Carvey, Al Madrigal, Sarah Tiana
5	August 5, 2019	Moshe Kasher, Natasha Leggero, Chelsea Peretti
6	August 6, 2019	Nick Kroll, Ian Edwards, Fortune Feimster
7	August 7, 2019	Kevin Nealon, Christina Pazsitzky, Guy Branum
8	August 8, 2019	Pete Holmes, Tony Rock, Chelsea Davison
9	August 12, 2019	Wayne Brady, Tim Dillon, Lauren Lapkus
10	August 13, 2019	Dennis Miller, Jo Koy, Punkie Johnson
11	August 14, 2019	Chris Franjola, Ron Funches, Megan Gailey
12	August 15, 2019	Todd Glass, Robin Thede, Josh Wolf
13	August 19, 2019	D'Arcy Carden, Henry Winkler, Bill Hader
14	August 20, 2019	Isla Fisher, Dave Attell, Greg Fitzsimmons
15	August 21, 2019	Todd Barry, Bert Kreischer, Nikki Glaser
16	August 22, 2019	Arturo Castro, Sarah Tiana, Thomas Lennon

==== September ====
No.	Original air date	Guest(s)
17	September 3, 2019	Jon Lovitz, Lauren Sivan, Pete Holmes
18	September 4, 2019	Margaret Cho, Stephen Rannazzisi, Kyle Dunnigan
19	September 5, 2019	Anthony Jeselnik, J. B. Smoove, Annie Lederman
20	September 9, 2019	Judd Apatow, Brett Gelman, Chance the Rapper
21	September 10, 2019	Bhad Bhabie, Donnell Rawlings, Guy Branum
22	September 11, 2019	Jay Leno, Natasha Leggero, Norm Macdonald
23	September 12, 2019	Sklar Brothers, Mary Lynn Rajskub
24	September 16, 2019	Bill Burr, Jim Jefferies
25	September 17, 2019	Brad Williams, Jen Kirkman, Rob Schneider
26	September 18, 2019	Jim Gaffigan, Sarah Tiana, Fred Armisen
27	September 19, 2019	Drew Carey, Fortune Feimster, Nikki Glaser
28	September 23, 2019	Joel McHale, Maria Bamford, Erik Griffin
29	September 24, 2019	Michael Rapaport, Christina Pazsitzky, Dulcé Sloan
30	September 25, 2019	Greg Fitzsimmons, Annie Lederman, Bill Engvall
31	September 26, 2019	Matt Walsh, Ian Edwards, Tim Dillon
32	September 30, 2019	Erin Foster, Sara Foster, Kevin Nealon

==== October ====
No.	Original air date	Guest(s)
33	October 1, 2019	Tony Rock, Patton Oswalt, Lauren Sivan
34	October 2, 2019	Martin Short, Maya Rudolph
35	October 3, 2019	Deon Cole, Todd Glass, Cristela Alonzo
36	October 7, 2019	Rob Corddry, Candice Thompson, Chris Franjola
37	October 8, 2019	Brett Gelman, Chris Jericho, Megan Gailey
38	October 9, 2019	Brad Garrett, Taran Killam, Leighton Meester
39	October 10, 2019	Ron Funches, Adam DeVine, Alexandra Shipp
40	October 14, 2019	Brad Williams, Eleanor Kerrigan, Adam Ray
41	October 15, 2019	Moshe Kasher, Lara Beitz, Bella Thorne
42	October 16, 2019	Thomas Lennon, Diplo, Whitney Cummings
43	October 17, 2019	Dusty Slay, Vanessa Bayer, Guy Branum
44	October 28, 2019	Dean Delray, Kevin Nealon, Liza Treyger
45	October 29, 2019	Jon Lovitz, Christina Pazsitzky, Benji Aflalo
46	October 30, 2019	Louie Anderson, Joey Diaz, Sarah Tiana
47	October 31, 2019	Tony Hale, Fortune Feimster, Josh Wolf

==== November ====
No.	Original air date	Guest(s)
48	November 4, 2019	Sklar Brothers, Celeste Barber
49	November 5, 2019	Amanda Cerny, Brendan Schaub, Whitney Cummings
50	November 6, 2019	Jen Kirkman, Jessica Kirson, Greg Fitzsimmons
51	November 7, 2019	Pete Holmes, Jim Jefferies, Hannah Hart
52	November 11, 2019	Erik Griffin, Chris D'Elia, Andrew Santino
53	November 12, 2019	Rob Schneider, Esther Povitsky, Matteo Lane
54	November 13, 2019	Chris Hardwick, Brian Posehn, Sarah Tiana
55	November 14, 2019	Jeff Ross, Brad Williams, Annie Lederman
56	November 18, 2019	Jeff Garlin, Guy Branum, Anna Faris
57	November 19, 2019	Ray Romano, Ron Funches, Nikki Glaser
58	November 20, 2019	Michael Rapaport, Liza Treyger, Tony Rock
59	November 21, 2019	Tom Papa, Fortune Feimster, Reggie Watts

==== December ====
No.	Original air date	Guest(s)
60	December 2, 2019	Kevin Nealon, Dennis Miller, Norm Macdonald
61	December 3, 2019	Rob Lowe, Dusty Slay, Annie Lederman
62	December 4, 2019	Adam Ray, Andrea Savage, Brent Morin
63	December 5, 2019	Casey Wilson, Nico Santos, Chris Hardwick
64	December 9, 2019	Rick Ingraham, Brendan Schaub, Megan Gailey
65	December 10, 2019	Bert Kreischer, Stephen Rannazzisi, Candice Thompson
66	December 11, 2019	Stassi Schroeder, Chris Franjola, Brad Williams
67	December 12, 2019	Sarah Tiana, Tim Dillon, Nate Bargatze
68	December 16, 2019	Moshe Kasher, Pete Holmes, Lauren Sivan
69	December 17, 2019	Erik Griffin, Cristela Alonzo, King Bach
70	December 18, 2019	Adam Sandler
71	December 19, 2019	Nicole Byer, Greg Fitzsimmons, Ron Funches

=== 2020 ===
==== January ====
No.	Original air date	Guest(s)
72	January 6, 2020	Jen Kirkman, Josh Wolf, Zainab Johnson
73	January 7, 2020	Benji Aflalo, Marcella Arguello, Rick Ingraham
74	January 8, 2020	Justin Martindale, Erik Griffin, Morgan Stewart
75	January 9, 2020	Sarah Tiana, Nikki Glaser, Tony Rock
76	January 13, 2020	Jeremiah Watkins, Kevin Nealon, Lara Beitz
77	January 14, 2020	Jim Gaffigan, Chris Hardwick, Whitney Cummings
78	January 15, 2020	Greg Fitzsimmons, Jameela Jamil, Fortune Feimster
79	January 16, 2020	Lizzy Cooperman, Guy Branum, Joel McHale
80	January 20, 2020	Punkie Johnson, Brad Garrett, Erik Griffin
81	January 21, 2020	Doug Benson, Annie Lederman, Stephen Rannazzisi
82	January 22, 2020	Jessimae Peluso, Josh Wolf, Arielle Vandenberg
83	January 23, 2020	Yamaneika Saunders, Tim Dillon, Andrew Santino
84	January 27, 2020	Kira Soltanovich, Chris Franjola, Brendan Schaub
85	January 28, 2020	Nicole Aimee Schreiber, Adam Ray, Tony Rock
86	January 29, 2020	Christina Pazsitzky, Preacher Lawson, Moshe Kasher
87	January 30, 2020	Megan Gailey, Brent Morin, Benji Aflalo

==== February ====
No.	Original air date	Guest(s)
88	February 3, 2020	Dana Gould, Cristela Alonzo, Pete Holmes
89	February 4, 2020	Rachel Mac, Sklar Brothers
90	February 5, 2020	Ron Funches, Jo Koy, Morgan Stewart
91	February 6, 2020	Mark Ellis, Annie Lederman, Justin Martindale
92	February 10, 2020	Sam Morril, Fortune Feimster, Sarah Tiana
93	February 11, 2020	Ian Edwards, Tim Dillon, Beth Stelling
94	February 12, 2020	Sara Weinshenk, Josh Wolf, Erik Griffin
95	February 13, 2020	Jim Carrey
96	February 24, 2020	Guilia Rozzi, Tony Rock, Chris Franjola
97	February 25, 2020	Jeff Ross, Dave Attell
98	February 26, 2020	Guy Branum, Moshe Kasher, Megan Gailey
99	February 27, 2020	Liza Treyger, Russell Peters, Andrew Santino

==== March ====
No.	Original air date	Guest(s)
100	March 2, 2020	Josh Wolf, Erik Griffin, Arielle Vandenberg
101	March 3, 2020	Candice Thompson, Sklar Brothers
102	March 4, 2020	Greg Fitzsimmons, Beth Stelling, Moshe Kasher
103	March 5, 2020	Brian Kiley, Zainab Johnson, Preacher Lawson
104	March 9, 2020	Jo Koy, Chris Hardwick, Yamaneika Saunders
105	March 10, 2020	Gabriel Iglesias, Megan Gailey, Chris Franjola
106	March 11, 2020	Tony Rock, Cristela Alonzo, Jim Jefferies
107	March 12, 2020	Zainab Johnson, Nikki Glaser, Fortune Feimster

== See also ==
- The Opposition with Jordan Klepper, predecessor in timeslot
- The Nightly Show with Larry Wilmore, predecessor in timeslot
- The Colbert Report, predecessor in timeslot
