= The Female Brain =

The Female Brain may refer to:

- The Female Brain (book), a 2006 book by Louann Brizendine
- The Female Brain (film), a 2017 comedy film
