= Female brain =

Female brain can refer to

- The female brain. See sexual differentiation#Brain differentiation.
- The 2006 book The Female Brain (book) by Louann Brizendine, M.D. about the subject.
