= Sherri Shepherd filmography =

This is the filmography for American television personality Sherri Shepherd.

== Film ==
Year	Title	Role	Notes
2000	King of the Open Mics	Marci	
2003	Pauly Shore Is Dead	Woman at Golf Course	
2004	Cellular	Jaded Cashier	
2005	Beauty Shop	Ida	
2005	Guess Who	Sydney	
2007	Who's Your Caddy?	Lady G	
2007	Transformers	Rhonda	IMAX re-release version only
2008	Madagascar: Escape 2 Africa	Florrie (voice)	
2009	Precious	Cornrows	
2009	Madea Goes to Jail	Herself	
2011	Big Mommas: Like Father, Like Son	Beverly Townsend	
2012	One for the Money	Lula	
2012	Think Like a Man	Vicki	
2012	Abducted: The Carlina White Story	Joy White	TV movie
2014	Top Five	Vanessa	
2015	Woodlawn	Momma Nathan	
2015	High Hoops	-	Short
2016	Ride Along 2	Cori	
2016	Jean of the Joneses	Maureen Jones	
2017	Hats	Tracy Lewis	Short
2018	Brian Banks	Leomia	
2019	Walk. Ride. Rodeo.	Felice	
2019	Twas the Chaos before Christmas	Valerie Russell	TV movie
2020	Regardless: The Freddy Soto Story	Herself	Documentary
2020	Half Husband	Jeanette	Short
2021	Hysterical	Herself	Documentary
2021	A Week Away	Kristin Alway	
2021	Imperfect High	Deborah Brooks	TV movie
2021	Back Home Again	Mrs. Tortoise (voice)	Short
2021	Hysterical	Herself	Documentary
2022	The Way Out	Veronica	Also executive producer
2025	Straw	Nicole	Released June 6, 2025

== Television ==
Year	Title	Role	Notes
1995	Cleghorne!	Victoria Carlson	Main cast (15 episodes)
1997	Claude's Crib	Lorene	Episode: "Clothes Encounter"
1997	Living Single	The Comedienne	Episode: "Swing Out Sisters"
1997	Suddenly Susan	Roni	Episode: "It's a Mad, Mad, Mad, Maddy World"
1998	Friends	Rhonda, The Tour Guide	Episode: "The One with Phoebe's Uterus"
1998–99	Holding the Baby	Miss Boggs	Main cast (8 episodes)
1998–03	Everybody Loves Raymond	Judy Potter	8 episodes
1999–00	Suddenly Susan	Miranda Charles	Main cast (23 episodes)
1999–01	The Jamie Foxx Show	Sheila Yarborough	14 episodes
2000	The Trouble with Normal	Nina	Episode: "Psychologists Without Borders"
2001	Rendez View	Herself	Episode: "Teacher's Pet!"
2001	Emeril	Melva LeBlanc	Main cast (11 episodes)
2002	Men, Women & Dogs	Dr. Michaels	Episode: "Cheese Dog"
2002	My Adventures in Television	Joanna Walker	Main cast (8 episodes)
2002–04	Pyramid	Herself/Celebrity Contestant	Recurring Guest
2002–06	Less than Perfect	Ramona Platt	Main cast (80 episodes)
2003	Laffapalooza	Herself	Episode: "Laffapalooza Volume 4"
2003	Joan of Arcadia	MVA Clerk God	Episode: "Drive, He Said"
2003–04	Hollywood Squares	Herself	Recurring Guest
2004	My Coolest Years	Herself	Episode: "My First Time, Summer Vacation"
2004–06	Brandy & Mr. Whiskers	Cheryl/Meryl (voice)	27 episodes
2004–07	Kim Possible	M.C Honey (voice)	3 episodes
2005	Steve Harvey's Big Time Challenge	Herself	Episode: "Episode #2.20"
2006	BET's Top 25	Herself	Episode: "Moments in Black History"
2007	The Wedding Bells	Debbie Quill	4 episodes
2007	Wheel of Fortune	Herself	Episode: "People Celebrity Week 2"
2007–12	30 Rock	Angie Jordan	11 episodes
2007–14	The View	Herself	Guest-Host: season 11-17
2008	Daytime Emmy Awards	Herself	TV special
2008	Entourage	Herself	Episode: "Fire Sale"
2009	Annual Trumpet Awards	Herself	TV special
2009	Sherri	Sherri Robinson	Main cast (13 episodes)
2009	Who Wants to Be a Millionaire	Herself	Episode: "John/Brian/Anthony°"
2010	The Jacksons: A Family Dynasty	Herself	Episode: "Come Together"
2010	The Electric Company	Herself	Episode: "Wicked Itch"
2010	Nickelodeon MegaMusic Fest	Herself	TV special
2010	Sesame Street	Herself	Episode: "Twins Day on Sesame Street"
2010–13	The Newlywed Game	Herself	TV series
2011	GMA Dove Award	Herself	TV special
2011	The Jerry Lewis MDA Labor Day Telethon	Herself	Episode: "MDA Labor Day Telethon 2011"
2011	Hot in Cleveland	Judge Lesser	Episode: "Hot for the Lawyer" & "Law & Elka"
2012	Dancing With The Stars	Herself	Contestant: Season 14
2012–15	The Soul Man	Nikki	11 episodes
2013	Dance Moms	Herself	Episode: "The View from the Top"
2013	Spontaneous Construction	Herself	Episode: "Super Storm Sandy Flash Mob Renovation"
2013	How I Met Your Mother	Daphne	8 episodes
2013–14	NickMom Night Out	Herself	TV series
2014	The Mommy Show	Herself	Episode: "Sherri Shepherd"
2014	Nashville	Herself	Episode: "Crazy"
2014	Extreme Weight Loss	Herself	Episode: "Kathie and Josh"
2014–15	Celebrity Name Game	Herself	Recurring Guest
2015	Consumed: The Real Restaurant Business	Herself	Episode: "Eat or Get Eaten"
2015	Tanked	Herself	Episode: "Sherri Shepherd on the Rocks"
2015	Holy & Hungry	Herself	TV series
2015	World's Funniest	Herself	Episode: "Internet Yearbook"
2015–16	Guilty Pleasures	Herself	Episode: "Holiday Decadence" & "Chocolate Obsessions"
2015–18	K.C. Undercover	Agent Beverly	7 episodes
2016	31st Annual Stellar Gospel Music Awards	Herself	TV special
2016	Match Made in Heaven	Herself	Season 2
2016	The $100,000 Pyramid	Herself	Episode: "Sherri Shepherd vs. Anthony Anderson and Rosie O'Donnell vs. Kathy Najimy"
2016	Rosewood	Dr. Anita Eubanks	3 episodes
2016–20	Match Game	Herself	Recurring Guest
2017	Gotham Comedy Live	Herself	Episode: "Sherri Shepherd"
2017	Face Value	Herself	Episode: "Ta'Rhonda Jones Vs. Sherri Shepherd"
2017	Who Wants to Be a Millionaire	Herself	2 episodes
2017–18	Man with a Plan	Joy	4 episodes
2017–18	Trial & Error	Anne Flatch	Main cast (23 episodes)
2017–19	Hollywood Game Night	Herself	Recurring guest
2017–19	Funny You Should Ask	Herself	Recurring guest
2017–21	To Tell the Truth	Herself	Recurring guest
2018	Celebrity Family Feud	Herself	Episode: "Sherri Shepherd vs Ian Ziering and Tommy Chong vs Derek Fisher & Gloria Govan"
2018	Marlon	Lenora	Episode: "Sisters"
2019	Best Ever Trivia Show	Herself	TV series
2019	The $100,000 Pyramid	Herself	Episode: "Rachel Dratch vs. Kevin Nealon and Sherri Shepard vs. Adam Pally"
2019	The Masked Singer	Penguin/Herself	Contestant: Season 2
2019	Rick and Morty	Judge/Tony's Wife (voice)	2 episodes
2019–20	Mr. Iglesias	Principal Paula Madison	Main cast (22 episodes)
2019–23	Dish Nation	Herself	TV series
2020	Celebrity Game Face	Herself	Episode: "Pointing Fingers and Toilet Paper Takedown"
2020	Iyanla, Fix My Life	Herself	Episode: "The Masks We Wear"
2020	Game On: A Comedy Crossover Event	Principal Paula Madison	Episode: "Mr. Iglesias: Olympic Effort"
2021	Celebrity Game Face	Herself	Episode: "Balloon Twerks and Googly Eyes"
2021	25 Words or Less	Herself	Recurring Guest
2021	Celebrity Wheel of Fortune	Herself	Episode: "Rachel Leigh Cook, Sherri Shepherd and Kevin Nealon"
2021	The Hollywood Moment	Herself	Episode: "BJ Korros with All Star 99th Birthday Salute to Norman Lear"
2021	You Bet Your Life	Herself	Episode: "Sherri Shepherd is Here"
2021	No Activity	Carol (voice)	Episode: "Brother Eduardo"
2021	Call Your Mother	Sharon	9 episodes
2021–22	The Wendy Williams Show	Herself	TV series
2021–24	The Sex Lives of College Girls	Senator Evette Chase	7 episodes
2022	Blaze and the Monster Machines	Queen Fastine (voice)	Episode: "The Fastest of Them All"
2022	The Real Housewives of Beverly Hills	Herself	Episode: "It Takes a Villain"
2022–2026	Sherri	Herself	TV series; also executive producer
2023	Celebrity Jeopardy!	Herself	Contestant

== Comedy specials ==
Year	Title	Notes
2013	Sherri Shepherd: It's My Time to Talk	Comedy Special

== Theatre ==
Year	Title	Role	Notes
2014	Rodgers and Hammerstein's Cinderella	Madame	Broadway musical
2023	Gutenberg! The Musical!	The Producer (One night only)	Broadway musical
