= Deon Cole's Black Box =

American comedy television series

- Genre: Comedy; Improv; Sketch
- Starring: Deon Cole
- Country of origin: United States
- Original language: English
- No. of seasons: 1
- No. of episodes: 6

Production
- Executive producers: David Kissinger; Deon Cole; Doug Karo; Jeff Ross
- Running time: 20–23 minutes
- Production companies: Conaco; Warner Horizon Television

Original release
- Network: TBS
- Release: June 10 – July 15, 2013

Deon Cole's Black Box is an American comedy television series that premiered on June 10, 2013, on TBS. The series features Deon Cole (stand-up comic and comedy writer) as he provides his commentary on videos found via the internet and television. On October 25, 2013, Deon Cole announced via Twitter that Black Box would not be returning to TBS.

== Episodes ==
No.	Title	Original release date	Prod. code	U.S. viewers (millions)
1	"Deon Tries to Reach Out to White People"	June 10, 2013	101	0.78
2	"Deon vs. Doogie"	June 17, 2013	102	0.87
3	"Deon Takes on Paula Deen, and Watermelon Oreos"	June 24, 2013	103	1.05
4	"Deon Discovers the Wettest in the Building"	July 1, 2013	104	0.91
5	"Bert and Ernie and the N Word"	July 8, 2013	105	0.78
6	"Sweet Home Chicago"	July 15, 2013	106	0.75
