= The Standups =

- Genre: Comedy
- Directed by: Troy Miller
- Starring: Nate Bargatze; Fortune Feimster; Deon Cole; Nikki Glaser; Beth Stelling; Dan Soder; Joe List; Gina Yashere; Kyle Kinane; Rachel Feinstein; Brent Morin; Aparna Nancherla; Brian Simpson; Naomi Ekperigin; Mark Normand; Janelle James; Dusty Slay; Melissa Villasenor
- Country of origin: United States
- Original language: English
- No. of seasons: 3
- No. of episodes: 18

Production
- Running time: 30 minutes

Original release
- Network: Netflix
- Release: July 4, 2017 – December 29, 2021

The Standups is an American comedy streaming television series. The series is a collection of 30-minute recordings of stand-up comedians, compiled and released by Netflix. The comedians featured in the series are generally less well-known than comics who have stand-alone specials. The first season premiered on July 4, 2017 and was followed up by a second season on March 20, 2018. In July 2021, Netflix renewed the series for a third season which premiered on December 29, 2021.

== Episodes ==
=== Series overview ===
Season	Episodes	Originally released
1	6	July 4, 2017
2	6	March 20, 2018
3	6	December 29, 2021

=== Season 1 (2017) ===
No. overall	No. in season	Comedian	Original release date
1	1	Nate Bargatze	July 4, 2017
2	2	Fortune Feimster	July 4, 2017
3	3	Deon Cole	July 4, 2017
4	4	Nikki Glaser	July 4, 2017
5	5	Beth Stelling	July 4, 2017
6	6	Dan Soder	July 4, 2017

=== Season 2 (2018) ===
No. overall	No. in season	Comedian	Original release date
7	1	Joe List	March 20, 2018
8	2	Gina Yashere	March 20, 2018
9	3	Kyle Kinane	March 20, 2018
10	4	Rachel Feinstein	March 20, 2018
11	5	Brent Morin	March 20, 2018
12	6	Aparna Nancherla	March 20, 2018

=== Season 3 (2021) ===
No. overall	No. in season	Comedian	Original release date
13	1	Brian Simpson	December 29, 2021
14	2	Naomi Ekperigin	December 29, 2021
15	3	Mark Normand	December 29, 2021
16	4	Janelle James	December 29, 2021
17	5	Dusty Slay	December 29, 2021
18	6	Melissa Villasenor	December 29, 2021
