= Reality Bites Back =

- Written by: Ethan T. Berlin; Tom Johnson
- Directed by: Brian Smith
- Starring: Michael Ian Black
- Country of origin: United States
- Original language: English
- No. of seasons: 1
- No. of episodes: 8

Production
- Executive producer: Adam Greener
- Producer: Scott Zabielski
- Running time: approx. 30 minutes
- Production company: 3 Ball Productions

Original release
- Network: Comedy Central
- Release: July 17 – September 4, 2008

Reality Bites Back is a reality show hosted by Michael Ian Black that parodies various reality show formats. It premiered July 17, 2008, on Comedy Central. The name is derived from the 1994 film Reality Bites.

== Premise ==
Ten comedians compete in a variety of contests that spoof popular reality shows. Each week one contestant is eliminated. The winner is then declared the "Lord of All Reality" and receives a $50,000 prize. The show is stated to be about 50% sketch comedy and 50% actual reality.

== Contestants ==
- Kyle Cease
- Chris Fairbanks
- Jeffrey Garcia
- Red Grant
- Tiffany Haddish
- Bert Kreischer
- Mo Mandel
- Donnell Rawlings
- Amy Schumer
- Theo Von

=== Standings ===
Elimination Chart
Contestant	Eliminated							
Contestant	Ep 1	Ep 2	Ep 3	Ep 4	Ep 5	Ep 6	Ep 7	Ep 8
Theo Von	WIN	IN	IN	IN	WIN	LOW	WIN	WINNER
Amy Schumer	IN	LOW	IN	IN	IN	IN	LOW	RUNNER-UP
Mo Mandel	IN	WIN	WIN	LOW	IN	WIN	OUT	
Chris Fairbanks	IN	LOW	IN	IN	WIN	OUT		
Bert Kreischer	IN	IN	LOW	IN	OUT			
Red Grant	IN	IN	IN	OUT				
Tiffany Haddish	IN	WIN	OUT					
Donnell Rawlings	LOW	OUT						
Kyle Cease	OUT							
Jeffrey "Jeff" Garcia	LEFT							

WINNER means the contestant won the competition.
RUNNER-UP means the contestant came in second over all in the competition.
WIN means the contestant won the immunity challenge, and was safe from being eliminated.
LOW means the contestant was eligible for elimination, but survived.
OUT means the contestant was eliminated
LEFT means the contestant voluntarily left the show.

== Episodes ==
No.	Title	Original release date
1	"Extreme Manipulation: House Edition"	July 17, 2008
The contestants' parents live with them for four days. Parodies: Extreme Makeover and Big Brother
2	"Shock of Love"	July 24, 2008
Competitors must seduce foul-mouthed comedian Luenell Campbell. Parodies: Rock of Love and Surreal Life
3	"The Biggest Chubby"	July 31, 2008
The comedians compete to gain the most weight. Parodies: The Biggest Loser
4	"Almost-American Gladiators"	August 7, 2008
A series of immigration-themed physical challenges are presented to the contestants. Co-host: A. D. Miles as Jack Gordon; Border guards: Gunter Schlierkamp as USA Hole, Brookelyn Freed as Teetz, Paul Vinson as 2nd Amendment Mike Parodies: American Gladiators, Are You Smarter Than A Fifth Grader?
5	"So You Think You Can Dive?"	August 14, 2008
The contestants participate in a diving competition. Celebrity judge: Greg Louganis Parodies: So You Think You Can Dance, The Bachelor, The Apprentice
6	"Hunting With the Stars"	August 21, 2008
Contestants are paired with D-list celebrities. Celebrity partners: Kato Kaelin, Chyna, Leif Garrett, Susan Olsen Parodies: Dancing with the Stars
7	"The Amazing Disgrace"	August 28, 2008
The bickering escalates in a number of shame and humiliation-based challenges. Parodies: The Amazing Race, Deadliest Catch, Deal or No Deal
8	"American Surv-idoler's Kitchen"	September 4, 2008
The contestants navigate a mash-up of challenges. Parodies: American Idol, Survivor, Hell's Kitchen
