= Language Log =

Linguistics blog

- Editor: Mark Liberman
- Editor: Geoffrey Pullum
- Format: Blog
- First issue: July 28, 2003
- Country: United States
- Based in: Institute for Research in Cognitive Science at the University of Pennsylvania
- Language: English
- Website: languagelog.ldc.upenn.edu

Language Log is a collaborative language blog maintained by Mark Liberman, a phonetician at the University of Pennsylvania.

Most of the posts focus on language use in the media and in popular culture. Text available through Google Search frequently serves as a corpus to test hypotheses about language. Other popular topics include the descriptivism/prescriptivism debate, and linguistics-related news items. The site has occasionally held contests in which visitors attempt to identify an obscure language.

As of 2012, Kristin Denham and Anne Lobeck characterized Language Log as "one of the most popular language sites on the Internet". As of June 2011 it received an average of almost 21,000 visits per day. In May 2006 Liberman and Geoffrey Pullum published a compilation of some of their blog posts in book form under the title Far from the Madding Gerund and Other Dispatches from Language Log.

== Specialties ==
Language Log was started on July 28, 2003, by Liberman and Pullum, a linguist then at the University of California, Santa Cruz (now at the University of Edinburgh). One early post about a woman who wrote egg corns instead of acorns led to the coinage of the word eggcorn to refer to a type of sporadic or idiosyncratic re-analysis. Another post about commonly recycled phrases in newspaper articles, e.g. "If Eskimos have N words for snow, X surely have Y words for Z", resulted in the coinage of the word snowclone. Both phenomena are common topics at the blog, as is linguification, or the use of metaphors that turn factual observations into claims about language in general (many of which are false).

The blog has a number of recurring themes, including the difficulty of transcribing spoken utterances accurately, misuse or misunderstanding of linguistic science in the media, criticism of the popular style guide The Elements of Style by E. B. White and William Strunk Jr., and complaints about what the contributors see as the pedantry of ill-informed prescriptivists, including that of some copyeditors (one of the blog's tags is "prescriptivist poppycock"). In addition, the site has critically addressed opinions and theories related to the Sapir–Whorf hypothesis concerning the relationship between culture, thought and language. Another common topic on the blog is the handling of taboo language in the media. Regular contributor Arnold Zwicky wrote a series of posts describing which words are considered obscene in various publications, paying particularly close attention to the way these words are "asterisked" in the different media forms.

== Becky Award ==
The Becky Award is a tongue-in-cheek award given out by the site. It is named after the sixteenth-century humanist Johannes Goropius Becanus, who claimed to have proved that the language of Eden was Dutch (his mother tongue).

The award for 2006 went to Louann Brizendine for her bestselling book, The Female Brain, which makes two principal claims: that women use language very differently from men, and that the causes of these differences are hormonal. Language Log's contributors quoted Nature ("riddled with scientific errors"), tracked down references in little-known journals, and presented counterarguments using the same referenced sources that Brizendine's claims drew from to demonstrate their lack of scientific reliability.

== Contributors ==
In addition to Liberman and Pullum, a number of other linguists contribute to Language Log:

- Adam Albright, a morphologist, phonologist, and assistant professor of linguistics at MIT
- Eric Baković, a phonologist and associate professor of linguistics at the University of California, San Diego.
- David Beaver, a semanticist and professor of linguistics at University of Texas at Austin
- Steven Bird, a computational linguist and associate professor of computer science at the University of Melbourne
- Lila Gleitman, a professor of linguistics at the University of Pennsylvania who specializes in psycholinguistics
- Daniel Jurafsky, an associate professor of linguistics at Stanford University who specializes in statistical models of human and machine language processing
- Victor H. Mair, an Indo-Europeanist, Sinologist and professor of Chinese language and Chinese literature at the University of Pennsylvania
- Norma Mendoza-Denton, a sociolinguist and assistant professor of anthropology at the University of Arizona
- John McWhorter, a fellow at the Manhattan Institute and former associate professor of linguistics at the University of California, Berkeley, specializing in creole languages
- Geoffrey Nunberg, chair of the American Heritage Dictionary usage panel and a professor at the UC Berkeley School of Information
- Barbara Partee, a semanticist and Professor Emerita at University of Massachusetts Amherst
- Bill Poser, a phonologist and adjunct professor of linguistics at the University of British Columbia
- Chris Potts, an associate professor of linguistics at Stanford University who specializes in semantics, pragmatics, and syntax
- Philip Resnik, a computational linguist and professor of linguistics at the University of Maryland, College Park
- Roger Shuy, Distinguished Research Professor of Linguistics, Emeritus of Georgetown University and a specialist in language and law.
- Sally Thomason, a professor of linguistics at the University of Michigan who specializes in contact-induced language change and Salishan linguistics
- Benjamin Zimmer, research associate at the Institute for Research in Cognitive Science at the University of Pennsylvania and consultant to the Oxford English Dictionary
- Arnold Zwicky, visiting professor of linguistics at Stanford University and emeritus professor of linguistics at Ohio State University

== Coinages ==
- eggcorn
- nerdview
- recency illusion
- snowclone
