= Eric Baković =

American linguist

Eric Baković is an American linguist who is a professor in the Department of Linguistics at the University of California, San Diego with a specialization in phonology. He is also affiliated with the Center for Research on Language (CRL), the Interdisciplinary Program in Cognitive Science, Computational Social Science, and Latin American Studies. He earned his BA in 1993 in linguistics from the University of California, Santa Cruz and completed his PhD under the supervision of Alan Prince at Rutgers in 2000 (with the dissertation Harmony, Dominance and Control).

Baković has made contributions to the study of phonology and phonological theory, with a focus on the predictions of Optimality Theory (OT) and the theory of sequentially ordered rules.

He was an occasional contributor to the Language Log from 2004 to 2017 and was the recipient of a UCSD Distinguished Teaching Award in 2006. He also managed the Rutgers Optimality Archive from 1996 to 2014.

== See also ==
- Vowel harmony
