= The Female Brain (film) =

- Theatrical release poster
- Directed by: Whitney Cummings
- Screenplay by: Neal Brennan; Whitney Cummings
- Based on: The Female Brain by Louann Brizendine
- Produced by: Erika Olde; Michael Roiff; Whitney Cummings
- Starring: Whitney Cummings; Sofía Vergara; Toby Kebbell; James Marsden; Lucy Punch; Beanie Feldstein; Cecily Strong; Deon Cole; Blake Griffin
- Cinematography: Bradford Lipson
- Edited by: Peggy Eghbalian
- Music by: Jeff Cardoni
- Production companies: Black Bicycle Entertainment; Night and Day Pictures
- Distributed by: IFC Films
- Release dates: June 17, 2017 (Los Angeles Film Festival); February 9, 2018 (United States)
- Running time: 99 minutes
- Country: United States
- Language: English
- Box office: $19,225

The Female Brain is a 2017 American comedy film directed by Whitney Cummings and written by Neal Brennan and Cummings. It is based on the 2006 book The Female Brain by Louann Brizendine. The film stars Cummings, Sofía Vergara, Toby Kebbell, James Marsden, Deon Cole, Lucy Punch, Beanie Feldstein, and Cecily Strong.

It had its world premiere at the Los Angeles Film Festival on June 17, 2017. It was released on February 9, 2018, by IFC Films.

== Plot ==
Stoic and uptight, university neurologist Julia Brizendine compares the female and male brain. She thinks she can outsmart her emotions, much to her assistant Abby's exasperation. She is divorced and living with her parents and Abby self-medicates.

Realtor Lisa Hampton and her husband of 12 years, Steven have a son Tyler. Fearing their relationship has grown dull, Lisa tries to spice things up by going on a date and getting high. Nothing works so they consider separation.

Perfectionist Lexi Mercer, fusses over her boyfriend of 2–3 years, Adam Simmons. Friends with Steven, he is fine with how he looks and won't straighten his hair as she wants. They break up when Lexi insists examining a tumor on his back, which turns out to be benign.

Zoe Green-Basker, a sales manager at an advertising company, resents gender stereotyping. She is close to starting her own firm with higher ideals. She and her pro basketball athlete husband Greg have been married for one year. At home from an injury, Greg commits to renovating the bathroom himself. It does not go well.

As part of her study, Brizendine scans the brains of test subjects. One day, a patient named Kevin Avery flirts with her before entering the MRI machine. Brizendine is flustered, despite what she’s been telling herself. The scan registers no empathy in his brain, so she dismisses him in her mind. He asks her on a date the next day, and he talks her into it. After, she swiftly initiates sex thinking that this is what he wants, but Kevin turns her down, saying he wants something deeper.

Brizendine moves into a new house and Kevin offers to fix an electrical wire. Again convinced her studies tell her what he wants, she makes it transactional, offering to pay him. Then when Kevin stops by her campus office because she won't return his texts, Brizendine tells him off and says she is fine without him. He says her testing is flawed because of her bias.

Lexi visits her parents one weekend and realizes her mother fusses over her the same as she has done to Adam. She goes back to Adam’s, who is surprised to see her with no makeup. She apologizes for trying to change him and wants to start over.

Greg is surprised to find a contractor working on the bathroom renovation and they get into a physical fight. Zoe, at home midday, stops the fight and says it was supposed to be a surprise. Then, Zoe states she has quit her job and she wants Greg to invest in her new company.

Brizendine herself goes in for a brain scan. Her brain reacts to the stimuli, and she realizes she can’t control it. She admits that female and male brains are different, and that showing emotions is not a sign of weakness, giving a TED talk about it. Realizing she does love Kevin, she finds him at work and says that even if her heart broke, it would be worth it to love him.

== Cast ==
- Whitney Cummings as Julia Brizendine
- Sofía Vergara as Lisa
- Toby Kebbell as Kevin
- James Marsden as Adam Simmons
- Lucy Punch as Lexi Mercer
- Beanie Feldstein as Abby Brooks
- Cecily Strong as Zoe
- Blake Griffin as Greg
- Deon Cole as Steven
- Marlo Thomas as Lynne Brizendine
- Jane Seymour as Cheryl Mercer
- Will Sasso as Dennis
- Ben Platt as Joel
- Adam Shapiro as Hank
- Adam Korson as Jimmy
- Phil Hendrie as Bill
- Neal Brennan as Marco
- Alysia Reiner as Erin
- Angel Parker as Jennifer
- Xosha Roquemore as Maggie
- Gwen Hollander as Rebecca
- Rebeka Montoya as Lola
- Andrew Schulz as Andi
- Lisa Linke as Emily
- Jaylin Fletcher as Ty
- Vinoj Zacharia as Bashir
- Rachel LaForce as Lindsay
- Beejay Hunter as Zachary

== Production ==
On May 23, 2016, it was announced Whitney Cummings would direct the film, with filming set to begin in July 2016.

== Release ==
The film premiered at the Los Angeles Film Festival on June 17, 2017. In November 2017, IFC Films acquired U.S. distribution rights to the film and set it for a February 9, 2018, release.

=== Critical reception ===
As of June 2020, the film holds a 35% approval rating on review aggregator website Rotten Tomatoes, based on 20 reviews with an average rating of 4.19/10. On Metacritic, the film has a weighted average score of 41 out of 100, based on 9 critics, indicating "mixed or average reviews".
