= The Tony Rock Project =

- Genre: Comedy
- Created by: Tony Rock; John Langley; Morgan Langley; Claude Brooks
- Starring: Tony Rock; Whitney Cummings; John Heffron
- Country of origin: United States
- Original language: English
- No. of seasons: 1
- No. of episodes: 8

Production
- Executive producers: Tony Rock and John Langley and Gelila Asres
- Production locations: Los Angeles, California
- Running time: 30 minutes
- Production companies: C to the B Productions; Langley Productions

Original release
- Network: MyNetworkTV
- Release: October 2008 – 2009

The Tony Rock Project is a sketch comedy television series that premiered on October 8, 2008 on MyNetworkTV and aired for one season. It starred Tony Rock, John Heffron and Whitney Cummings. It served as the lead-in for Flavor Flav's sitcom, Under One Roof.

== Plot ==
The Tony Rock Project follows comedian Tony Rock, younger brother of Chris Rock, as he observes the often humorous everyday habits of regular people. Through "man on the street" style interviews and hidden camera segments, Rock uses comedy to expose some of society's stereotypes, hang-ups, and prejudices.

== Episodes ==
Episode	Date
1	October 8, 2008
2	October 15, 2008
3	October 22, 2008
4	October 29, 2008
5	November 5, 2008
6	November 12, 2008
7	March 4, 2009
8	March 11, 2009
