= The Cabin with Bert Kreischer =

American television series

- Genre: Reality show
- Country of origin: United States
- Original language: English
- No. of episodes: 5

Production
- Running time: 22–27 minutes

Original release
- Network: Netflix
- Release: October 13, 2020

The Cabin with Bert Kreischer is a 2020 reality television series starring Bert Kreischer, where he is sent to the woods to detox but he brings friends.

== Cast ==
- Bert Kreischer
- LeeAnn Kreischer

== Guests ==
- Tom Segura
- Joey Diaz
- Nikki Glaser
- Caitlyn Jenner
- Fortune Feimster
- Donnell Rawlings
- Bobby Lee
- Kaley Cuoco
- Ms. Pat
- Joel McHale
- Gabriel Iglesias
- Big Jay Oakerson
- Anthony Anderson
- Deon Cole

== Episodes ==
No.	Title	Original release date
1	"Mind, Body and Soul"	October 13, 2020
with Tom Segura and Joey Diaz
2	"Tough Love"	October 13, 2020
with Nikki Glaser, Caitlyn Jenner, and Fortune Feimster
3	"Release"	October 13, 2020
with Donnell Rawlings, and Bobby Lee
4	"Fresh Perspectives"	October 13, 2020
with Ms. Pat, Kaley Cuoco, Joel McHale, and Gabriel Iglesias
5	"No Pain, No Gain"	October 13, 2020
with Big Jay Oakerson, Anthony Anderson, and Deon Cole

== Release ==
The Cabin with Bert Kreischer was released on October 13, 2020, on Netflix.
