= Tony Rock =

American actor and comedian (born 1974)

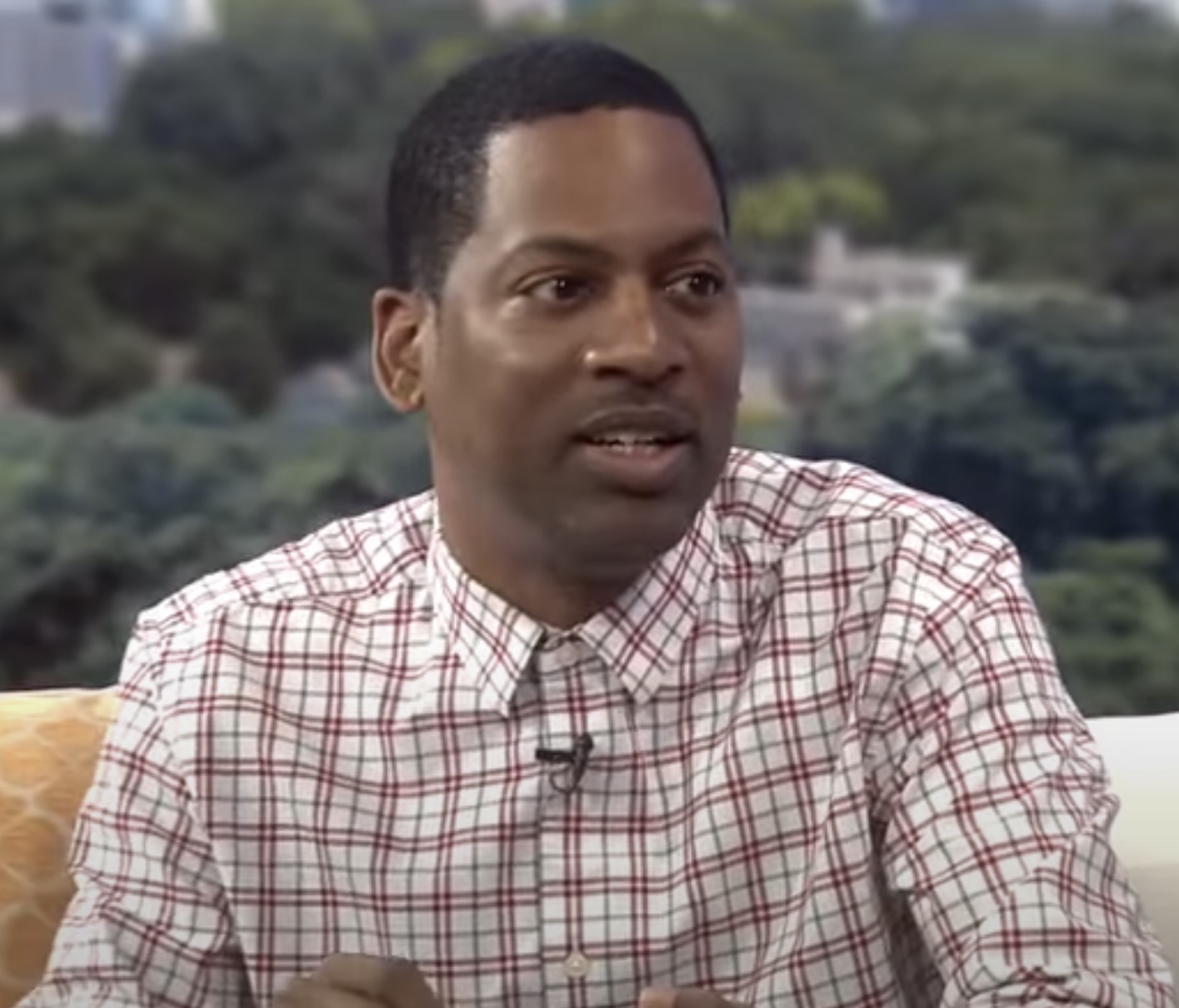
- Rock in 2018
- Born: Anthony Rock; June 30, 1974 (age 52); Brooklyn, New York, U.S.
- Occupations: Actor, stand-up comedian
- Years active: 1997–present
- Relatives: Chris Rock (brother)

Anthony Rock (born June 30, 1974) is an American actor and stand-up comedian, the younger brother of comedian Chris Rock. He is best known for playing Uncle Ryan on Everybody Hates Chris (2008–2009), and television producer Dirk Black on the UPN/The CW series All of Us (2003–2007). Rock also appeared in many films including What Goes Around Comes Around (2012) and Redemption of a Dog (2012).

Rock was a co-star on CBS's comedy Living Biblically, co-starring with Jay Ferguson, Lindsey Kraft, Camryn Manheim, and Sara Gilbert.

== Early life ==
Anthony Rock was born on June 30, 1974 in Brooklyn, New York. The son of Rosalie (née Tingman) and Julius Rock (d. 1988), he grew up on Decatur Street in the Bedford-Stuyvesant neighborhood of New York City. He has six brothers and one sister.

== Career ==
In the early 2000s, Rock hosted a short-lived game show titled Can You Tell? for the Oxygen network. He was also a correspondent for BattleBots on Comedy Central for the show's fifth season. Rock has appeared on radio and television shows including The Howard Stern Show and The D'Angelo Show. He performed in New York with Mark Curry and John Henton to highlight the Apollo Theater. He co-starred as Dirk Black on the UPN/The CW sitcom All of Us. Rock has often worked as a back-up to his brother Chris, and appeared on the latter's sitcom Everybody Hates Chris in the recurring role of the title character's uncle Ryan. Chris's fictitious brother Drew from the show is loosely based on Tony.

Rock has hosted The Funny Spot on TV One. He also starred in his own sketch comedy TV series, The Tony Rock Project, which was broadcast on MyNetworkTV from 2008 to 2009. On February 19, 2010, Comedy Central aired Tony Rock's feature on season 14 of Comedy Central Presents. His episode was the first original of the 2010 season. In 2012, Rock appeared in Think Like a Man, a feature film based on Steve Harvey's 2009 book Act Like a Lady, Think Like a Man. In the same year, Rock appeared in David E. Talbert's What Goes Around Comes Around and began hosting Apollo Live on BET.

In 2022, he appeared on the Netflix baking competition Is It Cake? as a judge. In April 2022, a video surfaced online of Rock performing a stand-up show while reacting to the Oscars incident where his brother Chris Rock was physically assaulted on stage by Will Smith after he had made comments on Smith's wife's bald appearance.

== Filmography ==
=== Film ===
Year	Title	Role	Notes
2006	Homie Spumoni	Dana	
2007	Life Support	Ness	TV movie
2007	Three Can Play That Game	Gizzard	
2012	Think Like a Man	Xavier	
2012	What Goes Around Comes Around	Ricky	Video
2012	C'mon Man	Jeff Woods	
2012	Redemption of a Dog	Chris	
2017	The Cheaters Club	Terrence	
2017	Killing Hasselhoff	Himself	
2018	Couples' Night	Rob	

=== Television ===
Year	Title	Role	Notes
2001	The Test	Himself/Panelist	Episode: "The Vanity Test"
2002	Kings of Black Comedy	Himself	Episode: "Keeping It Real... Funny"
2002	USO Comedy Tour	Himself	Episode: "Episode #1.105"
2002	BattleBots	Himself/Correspondent	Main Correspondent: Season 5
2003	Showtime at the Apollo	Himself	Episode: "Nivea/Tony Rock/Jamie Simone Nash"
2003–04	Can You Tell?	Himself/Host	Main Host
2003–07	All of Us	Dirk Black	Main Cast
2006	BET's Top 25 Countdown	Himself	Episode: "Moments in Black History"
2008	The Funny Spot	Himself/Host	Main Host
2008–09	Everybody Hates Chris	Uncle Ryan	Recurring Cast: Season 3–4
2008–09	The Tony Rock Project	Himself	Main Cast
2009–19	Laugh Factory	Himself	Recurring Guest
2010	Comedy Central Presents	Himself	Episode: "Tony Rock"
2010	Supreme Court of Comedy	Himself	Episode: "Tony Rock vs. Harland Williams"
2011	The Celibate Nympho Chronicles: The Web Series	Jason	Episode: "100 Days with No D"
2012	Russell Simmons Presents: The Ruckus	Himself	Episode: "Dov Davidoff/Damn Fool/Tony Rock"
2012	Don't Sleep! Hosted by T. J. Holmes	Himself/Panelist	Episode: "Affirmative Action"
2012	Big Morning Buzz Live	Himself/Panelist	Episode: "Flo Rida/Drew Lachey/Rick Springfield"
2012	Apollo Live	Himself/Host	Main Host
2012	Let's Stay Together	Larry	Episode: "An Even More Indecent Proposal"
2012	Single Ladies	Bobby Mornay	Episode: "Deuces"
2013	Gotham Comedy Live	Himself	Episode: "Tony Rock"
2013	Walk This Way	Himself	Episode: "No Laughing Matter"
2014	Mind of a Man	Himself/Panelist	Recurring Panelist
2015	Red Eye	Himself/Panelist	Episode: "August 20, 2015"
2015	Reed Between the Lines	Julius Darren	Recurring Cast: Season 2
2015–16	Real Husbands of Hollywood	Himself	Guest Cast: Season 4–5
2015–17	Mann & Wife	Michael Hobbs	Main Cast
2016	Love & Hip Hop: Atlanta	Himself	Episode: "Funny Business"
2017	The Game of Dating	Himself/Host	Main Host
2017	Apollo Night LA	Himself/Host	Episode: "ANLA 184"
2017	All Def Comedy	Himself/Host	Main Host
2018	The Real	Himself/Guest Co-Host	Episode: "Episode #4.116"
2018	Black Card Revoked	Himself/Host	Main Host
2018	Hip Hop Squares	Himself/Panelist	Episode: "Episode #5.7" & "#5.10"
2018	This Week at the Comedy Cellar	Himself	Episode: "November 25–30, 2018"
2018	Living Biblically	Vince	Main Cast
2019	Beat Bobby Flay	Himself/Celebrity Judge	Episode: "Pump It Up"
2019	Match Game	Himself/Celebrity Panelist	Episode: "Episode #4.8"
2019	The Cool Kids	Tony	Episode: "Vegas, Baby!"
2019–20	Lights Out with David Spade	Himself/Panelist	Recurring Panelist
2020	The Comedy Store	Himself	Recurring Guest
2022	Phat Tuesdays: The Era Of Hip Hop Comedy	Himself	Main Guest
2022	Is It Cake?	Himself/Judge	Episode: "Garage Mirage"
