= Average Joe (2023 TV series) =

American dark comedy television series

- Genre: Dark comedy; Crime drama; Drama; Thriller
- Created by: Robb Cullen
- Starring: Deon Cole; Tammy Townsend; Malcolm Barrett; Cynthia McWilliams; Michael Trucco; Ashley Olivia Fisher; Kathrine Barnes; Ashani Roberts; Pasha D. Lychnikoff
- Country of origin: United States
- Original language: English
- No. of seasons: 2
- No. of episodes: 18

Production
- Executive producers: Robb Cullen; McG; Mary Viola; Corey Marsh; Eric Dean Seaton; Deb Evans
- Camera setup: Single
- Production companies: DAE Light Media; Wonderland Sound and Vision

Original release
- Network: BET+
- Release: June 26 – August 17, 2023
- Network: Paramount+
- Release: August 19, 2026 – present

Average Joe is an American dark comedy-drama television series created by Robb Cullen. It premiered on BET+ on June 26, 2023 and later added to Netflix on August 15, 2024.

In June 2024, the series was renewed for a second season, which premiered on August 19, 2026 on Paramount+, after BET+ shut down in June.

== Plot ==
An everyday plumber named Joe learns that his recently deceased father was working for the Russian mafia and stole $10 million and a car from them. The mafia is now looking for Joe and the money.

== Cast and characters ==
- Deon Cole as Joe Washington
- Tammy Townsend as Angela Washington
- Malcolm Barrett as Leon Montgomery
- Cynthia McWilliams as Cathy Montgomery
- Michael Trucco as Benjamin "Touch" Tuchawuski
- Ashani Roberts as Sgt. Pam Talford
- Kathrine Barnes as Arina
- Ashley Olivia Fisher as Jennifer Washington
- Pasha D. Lychnikoff as Nicolai Dzhugashvili

== Episodes ==
Season	Episodes	Originally released		
Season	Episodes	First released	Last released	Network
1	10	June 26, 2023	August 17, 2023	BET+
2	8	August 19, 2026	September 30, 2026	Paramount+

=== Season 1 (2023) ===
No. overall	No. in season	Title	Directed by	Written by	Original release date
1	1	"Pilot"	Eric Dean Seaton	Robb Cullen	June 26, 2023
2	2	"Bachelor in Paradise"	Eric Dean Seaton	Scott Boden Hodges	June 26, 2023
3	3	"Donuts & Whiskey?"	Christoph Schrewe	Tyrone Finch	June 29, 2023
4	4	"The Above Average School Teacher"	Christoph Schrewe	Arthur Harris	July 6, 2023
5	5	"A Cautionary Tale of Frontier Justice"	Marshall Tyler	Bryce Ahart & Stephanie McFarlane	July 13, 2023
6	6	"Green and Blue"	Marshall Tyler	Jerron Horton	July 20, 2023
7	7	"Prisoners"	David Katzenberg	Kevin O'Hare	July 27, 2023
8	8	"Ride Or Die"	David Katzenberg	Hawa Macalou	August 3, 2023
9	9	"Sounds Like Mail Man"	Joy T. Lane	Robb Cullen	August 10, 2023
10	10	"You Must Be Joe"	Joy T. Lane	Paul McLalin & D.J. Ryan	August 17, 2023

=== Season 2 (2026) ===
No. overall	No. in season	Title	Directed by	Written by	Original release date
11	1	"67 Days Later"	Eric Dean Seaton	Robb Cullen	August 19, 2026
12	2	"The Sea Gave Up the Dead"	Eric Dean Seaton	Tyrone Finch	August 19, 2026
13	3	"Choose the Lion"	Joy T. Lane	Ruth Ferrera	August 26, 2026
14	4	"Dead Moms and Hitmen"	Joy T. Lane	Amanda Idoko	September 2, 2026
15	5	"Keep it Together"	Marshall Tyler	Scott Boden Hodges	September 9, 2026
16	6	"Blindspot"	Marshall Tyler	Kevin O'Hare	September 16, 2026
17	7	"Family Reunion"	David Katzenberg	D.J. Ryan	September 23, 2026
18	8	"Teddy's Dead - That's What I Said"	David Katzenberg	Robb Cullen	September 30, 2026

== Production ==
=== Development ===
The series was picked up by BET+ on February 7, 2022. In September 2022, it was announced that Eric Dean Seaton would direct the first episode. The series premiered on June 26, 2023.

On June 6, 2024, BET+ renewed the series for a second season. Season 2 started filming on February 7, 2025 and wrapped on May 13, 2025.

=== Casting ===
In April 2022, Deon Cole was cast in the leading role. The rest of the main cast was revealed on October 20, 2022.

== Critical response ==
On the review aggregator website Rotten Tomatoes, the first season of the show garnered a 86% score from critics, a "positive" score. Metacritic, which uses a weighted average, assigned a score of 73 out of 100 based on 5 critics, indicating "generally favorable" reviews. Daniel Fienberg from The Hollywood Reporter praised the tone and performances, especially from Deon Cole, Malcolm Barrett and Cynthia McWilliams.
