= Donnell Rawlings =

American actor and comedian (born 1968)

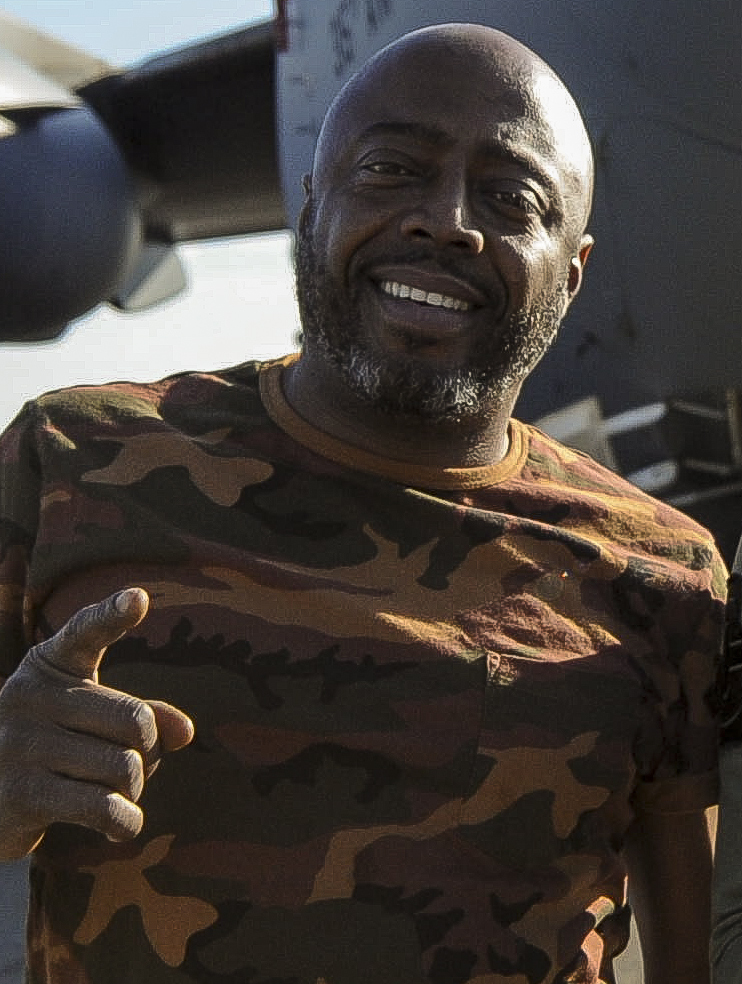
- Rawlings in 2017
- Born: Donnell M. Rawlings; December 6, 1968 (age 57); Washington, D.C., U.S.
- Notable work: Chappelle's Show; Guy Code; Guy Court; The Wire
- Children: Austen Rawlings

Comedy career
- Years active: 1991–present
- Medium: Comedy, film, television personality
- Genre: Comedy
- Website: donnellrawlings.com

Donnell Maurice Rawlings (born December 6, 1968) is an American comedian, actor, and radio host. He is best known as a cast member on the Comedy Central sketch comedy TV series Chappelle's Show and the HBO drama The Wire.

== Early life ==
Donnell Rawlings was born in Washington, D.C., and grew up in Alexandria, Virginia, with his mother. He attended T.C. Williams High School in Alexandria.

Rawlings served in the United States Air Force. He was stationed in South Korea and at Bolling Air Force Base in Washington, D.C., in the late 1980s and early 1990s.

== Career ==
=== Chappelle's Show ===
Rawlings is most notable for frequently appearing in sketches on Chappelle's Show and hosting the third season along with Charlie Murphy. His catchphrase on the show was "I'm rich, biaaaaatch!" (which is played at the end of every episode as part of Dave Chappelle's vanity card) as well as frequently adding "Son!" at the end of each sentence.

He demonstrated his rudimentary knowledge of Korean, which he learned in the Air Force, in the sketches "Player Hater's Ball" and "The Time Haters", the latter of which was featured in the "Failures" episode. Rawlings reprised his role as the hater "Beautiful", known for wearing a Jheri curl and a suit similar to ones that Little Richard wore. In the sketches, he responded to the comments of Korean hater "Mr. Roboto" with insults in Korean. He reprised the role of Beautiful on Chappelle's episode of Saturday Night Live.

On Heavy.com, Rawlings starred in a series of sketch comedy clips portraying his character Ashy Larry, from Chappelle's Show, called "From Ashy to Classy". Ashy Larry dreamed of how his life would be if he were classy and dreams up a character who he calls Ashford Lawrence, a supposed reporter for heavy.com. Ashy Larry would go to different high-class establishments posing as a reporter, where eventually his girl would appear and pull him out at the end of each clip.

=== Other work ===
Rawlings also made appearances on HBO drama series The Corner, playing Bread the dope fiend next to Fat Curt and The Wire, playing Damien Lavelle 'Day-Day' Price, an ex-convict who is hired as a legislative aide and driver for corrupt state senator Clay Davis. Price's character appears unrefined on several occasions, contemplating heists in public and stating things in court such as "Y'all tryin' to 'criminate me" while on the stand. Davis is played by fellow Chappelle's Show co-star Isiah Whitlock, Jr.

Rawlings appears in Sam Raimi's Spider-Man 2 and in a cameo appearance in the music video for Jim Jones' "We Fly High" (Ballin' Remix). He was a regular on The Ricki Lake Show mostly as a judge on various challenge episodes.

In the summer of 2007, Rawlings was featured on the cover of the one-year anniversary issue of Beyond Race magazine. Rawlings was removed from his morning show post at Power 105's Ed Lover Show with Egypt and Ashy for a controversial comment he made during the aftermath of the Don Imus controversy, responding to Ed Lover's comment "That's a cheap black man, Nickel-Black" with "that's a Jewish black guy."

Rawlings was also a contestant in the Comedy Central show Reality Bites Back. He appeared in sketches on D.L. Hughley Breaks the News and in Howard Stern's Howard TV On Demand original series, Show in the Hallway.

In July 2009, Rawlings recorded a clip imitating Stephon Marbury crying on his live webcast. Rawlings was a co-host on the Big Tigger Morning Show on Washington, D.C.'s radio station WPGC 95.5 from April 2010 to January 2011.

In 2011, Rawlings appeared on the MTV2 show Guy Code which he has done two seasons, as well as the show Hip Hop Squares. He is also the judge for a Guy Code spin-off, Guy Court.

Rawlings provided the voice of A Cat Named Rollo's brother in the Adult Swim show based on the 2009 R-rated movie Black Dynamite.

He also appeared on the April 23, 2014 episode of the Dr. Zoe Today show discussing his recent appearances with MTV and his comedy work.

In 2015, he guest starred as an angel that took Jesus' divinity during his time of doubt in the "A Very Special Christmas in Compton" episode of Black Jesus.

Rawlings voices the barber Dez in the 2020 Pixar movie Soul.

== Filmography ==
=== Film ===
| Year | Title | Role | Notes |
|---|---|---|---|
| 1999 | Fever | Cop | |
| 2000 | Knights of the Heights | Oscar Thorpe | Short |
| 2003 | Kings County | Winston | |
| 2003 | Brotherly Love | Emmitt Diallo | Video |
| 2004 | ¡Capicu! | Comedian Narrator | Short |
| 2004 | Spider-Man 2 | Pizza 'Heist' Witness | |
| 2005 | Blood of a Champion | Decaf | Video |
| 2006 | Fifty Pills | C-Low | |
| 2006 | Car Babes | Julius Jefferson | |
| 2007 | Goodbye Baby | Comic #4 | |
| 2007 | Twisted Fortune | Costello | |
| 2007 | Why Not Wysean | Himself | Short |
| 2008 | Legacy | Det. Sams | Video |
| 2009 | Last Day of Summer | Cop #1 | |
| 2010 | The Rise and Fall of John Tesoro | Travis Smildon | Short |
| 2010 | Something Like a Business | Avery | |
| 2011 | Laughing to the Bank with Brian Hooks | Various | |
| 2011 | Black Jack | Malcolm T Jerome | TV movie |
| 2013 | TubbyMan | TubbyMan's Dad | Short |
| 2014 | Percentage | Petey | |
| 2014 | The 30 Year Old Bris | Jamesy Jones | |
| 2015 | American Dirtbags | Smalls' Dad | |
| 2015 | T-Robe: Based on a True Story | Himself | |
| 2016 | The Last Film Festival | Jermaine Johnson | |
| 2016 | All Def Digital's Roast of America | Himself | TV movie |
| 2017 | Kuso | Mazu (voice) | |
| 2018 | Hollyweed | Nips | TV movie |
| 2019 | Inside the Rain | Sammy | |
| 2019 | Jay and Silent Bob Reboot | Captain | |
| 2020 | Mo'Nique & Friends: Live from Atlanta | Himself | |
| 2020 | Soul | Dez (voice) | |
| 2022 | Clerks III | Auditioner 8 | |
| 2024 | Switch Up | Marcel | |
| 2024 | He Looked like a Postcard | Al | |
| 2025 | Paradise Records | Mitch Callahan | |

=== Television ===
| Year | Title | Role | Notes |
|---|---|---|---|
| 1996 | Def Comedy Jam | Himself | Episode: "Episode #4.3" |
| 1998 | Law & Order | Etienne | Episode: "True North" |
| 2000 | The Corner | Bread | Recurring Cast |
| 2000 | It's Showtime at the Apollo | Himself | Episode: "Jagged Edge/RZA/Donnell Rawlings" |
| 2001 | ComicView | Himself | Episode: "Episode #9.37" |
| 2002–2008 | The Wire | Damien 'Day-Day' Price | Recurring Cast: Season 1 & 5 |
| 2003 | Third Watch | Tony | Episode: "10-13" |
| 2003 | Law & Order: Criminal Intent | Don | Episode: "Cold Comfort" |
| 2003 | I Love the '80s Strikes Back | Himself | TV series |
| 2003–2004 | Chappelle's Show | Various Characters | Main Cast |
| 2004 | Super Secret Movie Rules | Himself | Episode: "Sports Underdogs" |
| 2004 | Premium Blend | Himself | Episode: "Comedy Central's Premium Blend" |
| 2006 | BET's Top 25 Countdown | Himself | Episode: "Moments in Black History" |
| 2006 | It's Showtime at the Apollo | Himself | Episode: "Shareefa" |
| 2007 | 1st Amendment Stand Up | Himself | Episode: "Donnell Rawlings/Ian Edwards/Sheryl Underwood" |
| 2007 | The Bad Boys of Comedy | Himself | Episode: "Episode #2.3" |
| 2008 | I Love the New Millennium | Himself | Episode: "2007" |
| 2008 | Reality Bites Back | Himself/Contestant | Main Cast |
| 2008 | ComicView | Himself | Episode: "ComicView: One Mic Stand" |
| 2008 | The World Stands Up | Himself | Episode: "Episode #5.8" & "#5.20" |
| 2009 | Black to the Future | Himself | Episode: "Hour 3: The 90s" & "Hour 4: The 00s" |
| 2010–2012 | Laugh Factory | Himself | Recurring Guest |
| 2011 | In the Flow with Affion Crockett | Ashy Larry | Episode: "Pass the Torch" |
| 2011–2012 | Guy Code | Himself | Main Cast: Season 1-2 |
| 2012 | Hip Hop Squares | Himself | Episode: "Episode #1.2" |
| 2012–2014 | Black Dynamite | A Cat Named Rallo (voice) | Guest Cast: Season 1-2 |
| 2013 | Guy Court | Judge Donnell Rawlings | Main Cast |
| 2013–2014 | StaannDUP! | Himself/Host | Main Host |
| 2014 | Step 9 | Donnell | Main Cast |
| 2014 | Comics Unleashed | Himself | Episode: "July 1, 2014" |
| 2015 | Black Jesus | Himself | Episode: "A Very Special Christmas in Compton" |
| 2016 | Unsung Hollywood | Himself | Episode: "Charlie Murphy" |
| 2016 | The 5th Quarter | Brian Adele | Episode: "The Processor" |
| 2016 | Saturday Night Live | Beautiful | Episode: "Dave Chappelle/A Tribe Called Quest" |
| 2016–2017 | Project Dad | Himself | Main Cast |
| 2017 | Jeff & Some Aliens | Comedian (voice) | Episode: "Jeff & Some Laughs" |
| 2017 | Face Value | Himself/Team Captain | Episode: "Kym Whitley vs Donnell Rawlings" |
| 2018 | Rich Africans | GioVanni | Main Cast |
| 2018 | Black Card Revoked | Himself | Episode: "Big Boy, Donnell Rawlings, Rotimi" |
| 2019 | The New Negroes | Himself | Episode: "Criminality" |
| 2019 | Beyond the Arc | Himself | Episode: "Montreal" |
| 2019 | Laff Mobb's Laff Tracks | Himself | Recurring Guest |
| 2019 | The Degenerates | Himself | Episode: "Donnell Rawlings" |
| 2019 | The Last O.G. | Duke | Episode: "Keep Their Heads Ringing" |
| 2019 | It's Bruno! | Crackhead Carl | Main Cast |
| 2019 | Historical Roasts | Aspy Larry | Episode: "Cleopatra" |
| 2020 | The Cabin with Bert Kreischer | Himself | Episode: "Release" |
| 2020 | All the Way Black | Himself | Episode: "It's My House!" |
| 2021 | Dark Humor | Himself | Main Guest |
| 2021 | Sex Sells | Himself | Episode: "BDSM" |
| 2021 | Twenties | Dwayne | Recurring Cast: Season 2 |
| 2021–2025 | BMF | Alvin | Guest: Season 1 & 4, Recurring Cast: Season 2 |
| 2022 | Phat Tuesdays: The Era Of Hip Hop Comedy | Himself | Main Guest |
| 2022 | Celebrity Game Face | Himself | Episode: "A Bunch of Ask Holes" |
| 2022 | Saturday Night Live | Himself | Episode: "Dave Chappelle/Black Star" |
| 2022 | Winning Time: The Rise of the Lakers Dynasty | Mr. Earl | Recurring Cast: Season 1 |
| 2025 | Equal Justice with Judge Eboni K. Williams | Himself | Episode: "Koi Story" |

=== Music video ===
| Year | Song | Artist | Role |
|---|---|---|---|
| 2007 | "Put It Down" | Redman | Cop |

=== Documentary ===
| Year | Title |
|---|---|
| 2005 | The Funniest Man Dead or Alive |
| 2009 | The Tragic Side of Comedy |
| 2010 | I Am Comic |
| 2021 | Patrice O'Neal: Killing Is Easy |
| 2021 | Bitchin': The Sound and Fury of Rick James |

=== Comedy releases ===
| Year | Title | Notes |
|---|---|---|
| 2010 | From Ashy to Classy | special |
| 2017 | Ain't Worried About... | album |
| 2021 | Ya'll Need to Chill | album |
| 2024 | Chappelle's Home Team: Donnell Rawlings - A New Day | special |

=== Stand-up appearances ===
| Year | Show | Episode |
|---|---|---|
| 2019 | The Degenerates | "Donnell Rawlings" |

=== Podcasts ===
| Year(s) | Title |
|---|---|
| 2019–2020 | The Donnell Rawlings Show |
