= Dusty Slay =

American comedian (born 1982)

- Slay in 2022
- Born: Dustin Richard Slay; May 18, 1982 (age 44); Opelika, Alabama, U.S.
- Occupation: Comedian
- Years active: 2008–present
- Children: 3

Dustin "Dusty" Slay (born May 18, 1982) is an American stand-up comedian. He is known for his blue-collar storytelling style centering on his personal history and observations.

== Early life ==
Dusty Slay grew up in a trailer park in Opelika, Alabama. His parents divorced when he was two, and he mostly lived with his mother and older sisters in their trailer. He attended Opelika High School and graduated in 2000.

== Career ==
Slay started his career working as a pesticide salesman but moved to Charleston, South Carolina, in 2004 and joined the improv comedy scene, then began stand-up comedy. After several unsuccessful attempts, he finally broke out in 2008, and has been doing stand-up comedy ever since.

He then went to New York City to try stand-up comedy there before moving to Nashville in 2014. Slay has listed Jeff Foxworthy as one of his inspirations. In 2019, Variety listed Slay as one of “10 Comics To Watch.”

Slay has released a stand-up comedy special on Comedy Central, and has appeared on The Tonight Show Starring Jimmy Fallon and Jimmy Kimmel Live!. In 2021, Slay appeared in season three of the Netflix The Standups comedy special series. His special Workin' Man premiered on Netflix in January 2024. His special Wet Heat premiered on Netflix on July 29, 2025. Slay also made a cameo as a horse trainer in the 2026 film The Breadwinner, starring Nate Bargatze with cameo appearances from Dusty's Public Figures co-hosts, Brian Bates and Aaron Weber, who played trash collectors.

Slay hosts the "We're Having A Good Time" podcast with his wife Hannah, where they tell stories, give comedy advice, and talk about the Bible. Slay was a co-host of The Nateland Podcast, along with Nate Bargatze, Brian "Breakfast" Bates, and Aaron Weber. The show was later re-vamped as The Public Figures Podcast, where Slay now co-hosts with Brian Bates and Aaron Weber.

== Personal life ==
Slay has been sober since 2012. He lives in Nashville, Tennessee along with his wife Hannah and three children.
