= Brent Morin =

American actor (born 1986)

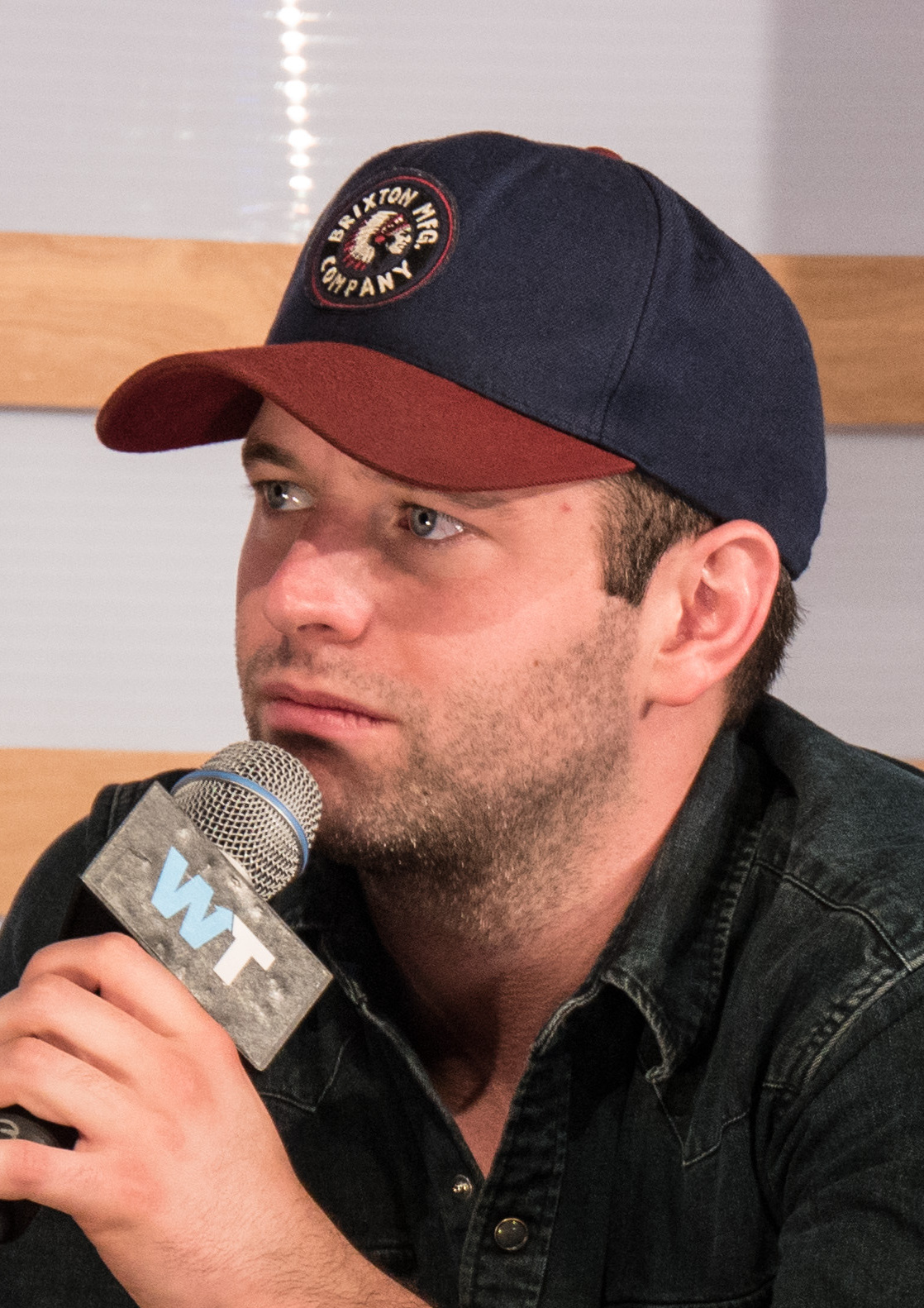
- Morin in 2014
- Born: August 31, 1986 (age 40)
- Education: Columbia College Hollywood

Comedy career
- Years active: 2011–present
- Medium: Stand-up; film; television
- Website: brentmor.in

Brent Morin (born August 31, 1986) is an American stand-up comedian and actor. He was a panelist in the sixth season of Chelsea Lately and played Justin Kearney on the NBC sitcom Undateable, Matt on the Netflix series Merry Happy Whatever, and agent Hobbs on the sci-fi web-series Crunch Time, on Rooster Teeth. In 2015, Morin released his stand-up comedy show, I'm Brent Morin, exclusively on Netflix.

== Early life ==
Morin is the son of two inner city high school English teacher parents. Morin has an older brother, who was a concert pianist. He also had a younger brother, who was a professional figure skater turned OBGYN doctor, who died in 2024. He graduated from South Windsor High School. He is of Irish and Italian background.

== Career ==
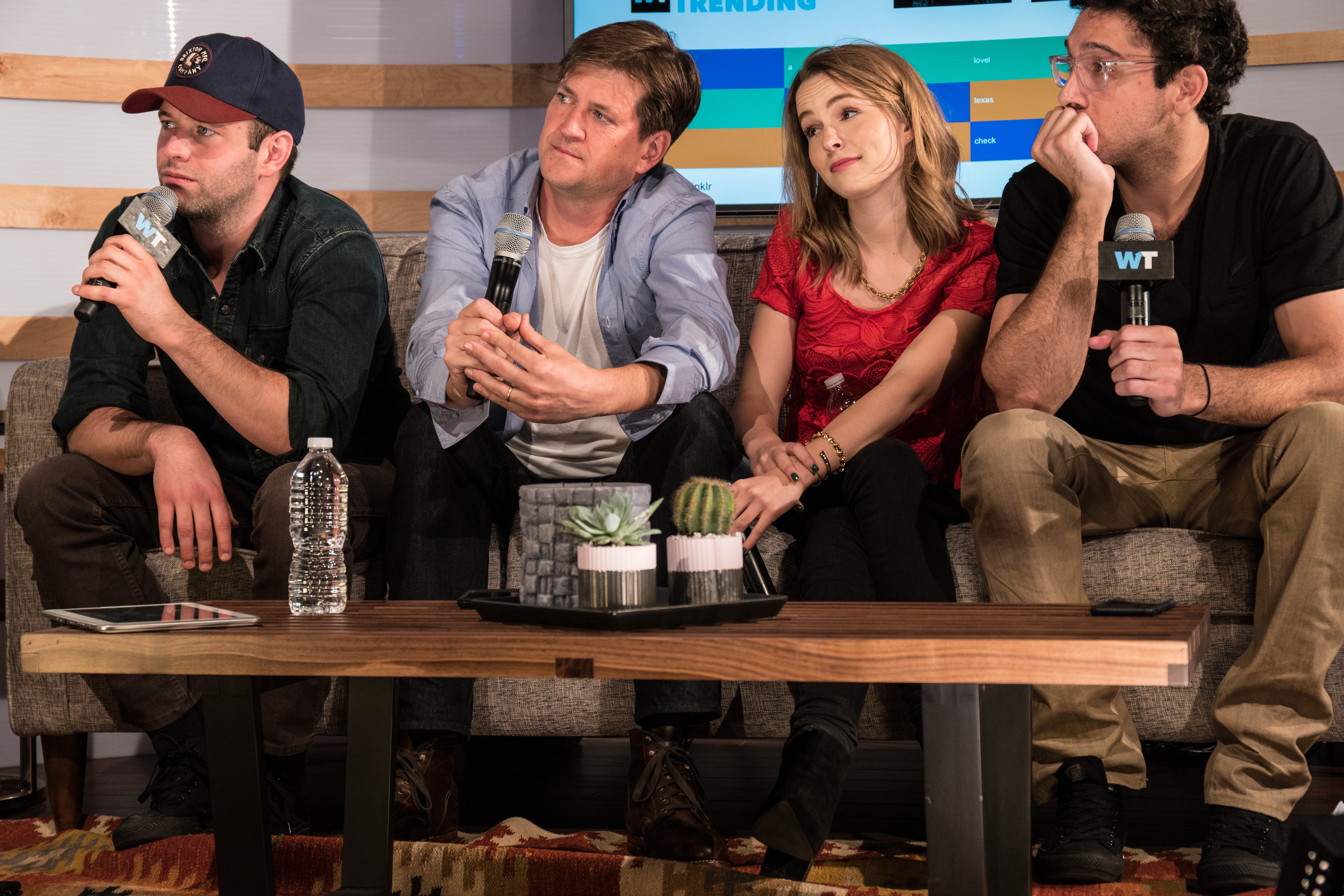
Morin (left) with the cast of Undateable, in 2015.

Morin moved to Los Angeles at 18 to study at a film school at Columbia College Hollywood. Although he graduated with a film degree, Morin started doing stand-up and eventually decided that was what he wanted to do. Morin has said that he was inspired by his idols, Albert Brooks and Woody Allen. After graduation, he worked as a production assistant with Conan O'Brien on The Tonight Show with Conan O'Brien on NBC and continued with Conan on TBS. He went from being a general office production assistant to becoming the set production assistant/Andy Richter's stand-in. Morin has appeared regularly as a stand-up comic on shows with The Comedy Store, The Improv and Laugh Factory, as well as on tours throughout the United States. In his network TV debut, Morin co-starred in the Bill Lawrence NBC series Undateable, a multi-camera sitcom with a live audience, which was based on the book Undateable: 311 Things Guys Do That Guarantee They Won't Be Dating or Having Sex by Ellen Rakieten and Anne Coyle.

Morin portrayed Justin Kearney, the owner of Black Eyes Bar and hopeless romantic roommate of Danny (played by Chris D'Elia). The show often incorporates improv, with Morin playing Felix to D'Elia's grouch Oscar à la The Odd Couple. Lawrence and the cast (Chris D'Elia, Morin, Ron Funches, and Rick Glassman) went on a series of stand-up tour dates, with an appearance on @midnight to promote the show. In 2016, Morin was cast for the Rooster Teeth web series, Crunch Time. In 2018, he appeared on the second season of Netflix's The Standups, performing a half-hour special.

== Personal life ==
Morin previously dated actress Angie Simms, confirming their relationship in 2016, and breakup in 2017.

== Filmography ==
Film
Year	Title	Role	Notes
2016	How to Be Single	Lucy's Date	
2017	The Outdoorsman	Jason	
2021	Yes Day	Bob	

Television
Year	Title	Role	Notes
2012	Chelsea Lately	Himself	Guest
2013	Adam DeVine's House Party	Himself	Episode: "Foam Party"
2014	Brooklyn Nine-Nine	Gregory Phillips	Episode: "Chocolate Milk"
2014	The McCarthys	Tommy O'Gara	Episode: "Why Guys Shouldn't Date Their Sister's Ex"
2014	Ground Floor	Jasper McCabe	Episodes: "The Break-Ups" and "Mano-a-Mansifled"
2015	I'm Brent Morin	Himself	Television special
2014–16	Undateable	Justin Kearney	Main role
2016	Lip Sync Battle	Himself	Episode: "Brent Morin vs. Chris D'Elia"
2018	The Standups	Himself	Episode: "Brent Morin"
2019	Merry Happy Whatever	Matt	Main role
2021–23	Alpha Betas	Stephen (voice)	7 episodes; recurring role

Web
Year	Title	Role	Notes
2015	The Sixth Lead	Himself	Episode: "The Perfect Joke"
2016	On The Spot	Himself	Episode: "Brent Morin"
2016	Crunch Time	Special agent Hobbs	6 episodes
2016	Above Average Presents	White Anchor	Episode: "The Kicker: For Fans. For Fun."

== Stage ==
Year	Title	Role	Notes
2011	Comedy Juice	Himself	Stand-up comedy show
2016	I'm Brent Morin	Himself	Stand-up comedy show
