= Beth Stelling =

American comedian and comedy writer

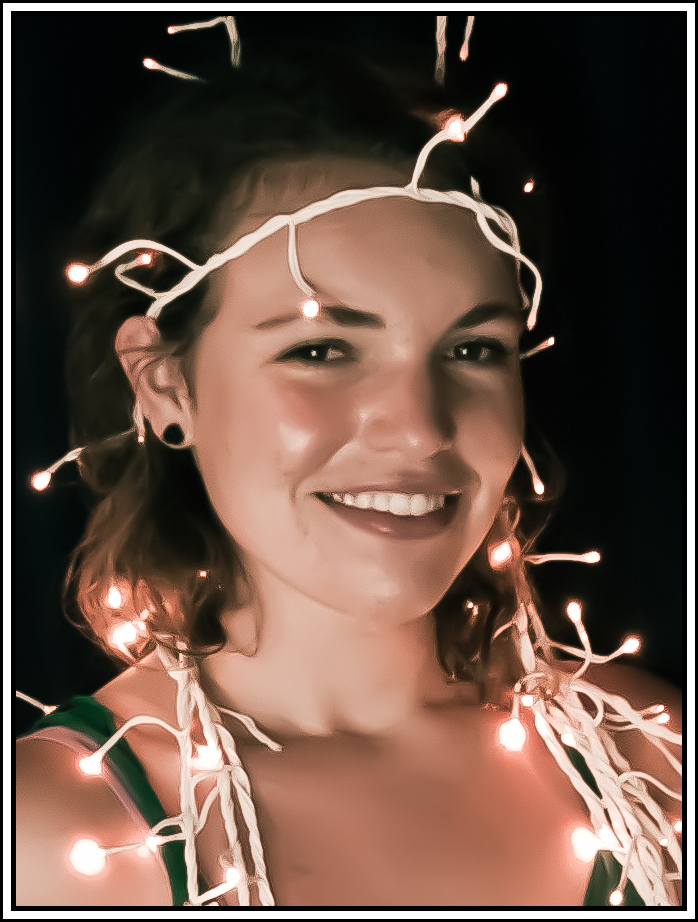
Stelling at Just For Laughs Chicago in July 2010

Beth Stelling (born April 9, 1986) is an American stand-up comedian and writer. She has performed in the Netflix series The Standups and served as a writer for Crashing, an HBO series. Stelling has released two comedy albums, Sweet Beth and Simply the Beth, and two comedy specials, Girl Daddy and If You Didn't Want Me Then.

== Background ==
Stelling grew up in Oakwood, Ohio, a Dayton suburb in an all-female household with two older sisters. Her father was bipolar and she has spoken about how it had an impact on her. She told Dan Le Batard on his South Beach Sessions podcast on June 12, 2026 that she imitated Robin Williams and Jim Carrey as a child for laughs. She enjoyed watching comedy movies including those starring Mike Myers, Chris Rock, and Whoopi Goldberg, but she was unaware of their careers in stand-up comedy. While in high school, she won the 2003 Ohio Speech and Debate Association championship in Humorous Interpretation. In 2007, she graduated from nearby Miami University in Oxford, Ohio with a BA degree in theater.

== Career ==
Stelling lived and worked in Chicago for five years until 2012, when she moved to Los Angeles after releasing her first comedy album, Sweet Beth. In 2014, she made her television debut on Conan, and in 2016, was named a "Comedian to Watch" by Out magazine. Also in 2016, she was featured in an episode of Outside Comedy, which premiered at the LA Film Festival.

Stelling has performed on Jimmy Kimmel Live!, The Meltdown with Jonah and Kumail, @midnight, Last Call with Carson Daly, The UCB Show, The Pete Holmes Show, and We Can Fix You. In 2015, she had a special released as part of the Comedy Central series The Half Hour. Her comedy album, Simply the Beth, was named one of the best comedy specials of 2015 by Vulture. She also starred in Showtime's special Comedy of SXSW. Stelling tours stand-up comedy clubs, colleges and festivals; guest starred on the Amazon Prime Video series Red Oaks; and wrote for Crashing, an HBO series from Judd Apatow starring Pete Holmes. On August 20, 2020, her one-hour special Girl Daddy premiered on HBO Max, and in 2021, she had a recurring role on the new Peacock sitcom Rutherford Falls. It ran for two seasons.

Stelling's comedy is marked by her ability to transform personal, often uncomfortable, experiences into laugh-out-loud moments. A notable example is her recounting a traumatic experience working at a Greek restaurant, where she was thrown into a fountain by her manager as part of an ill-advised tradition of hazing new employees. The absurd as well as unsettling incident, which she tells with humor, contributed to her decision to leave the restaurant industry for good.

In addition to her stand-up career, Stelling is known for her role as a punch-up writer, where she has contributed to numerous projects, adding sharp, witty humor behind the scenes. Her ability to enhance material has earned her a reputation in the entertainment industry, though she often works anonymously and doesn’t take credit for her contributions. For instance, she worked on the 2019 comedy Good Boys, where her jokes made it into the worldwide trailer, despite her name not appearing in the credits.

== Personal life ==
Beth Stelling has a deep-rooted connection to sports, particularly field hockey, which she played during her youth. In 2023, she returned to the sport, making the U.S. Women's Masters Field Hockey Team. She competed in the Pan American Masters Continental Cup in Buenos Aires, where the team secured a silver medal. Later in 2023, she participated in the Masters World Cup in Cape Town, South Africa continuing to represent her team at a high level.

== Abuse ==
In 2015, Stelling revealed that she had suffered sexual and physical abuse from a former boyfriend. She said that after the two broke up, he had asked her never to speak about the abuse in order for him to maintain his reputation. Stelling posted images of her bruised limbs on Instagram, saying that they were photographs taken when the abuse happened.

== Works ==
=== Comedy ===
Year	Title	Type
2012	Sweet Beth	album
2015	Simply the Beth	album
2020	Girl Daddy	special
2023	If You Didn't Want Me Then	special

=== Podcast ===
Year(s)	Title	Co-host
2020–21	We Called Your Mom	Diane Stelling
