= Whitney Cummings =

American actress, writer (born 1982)

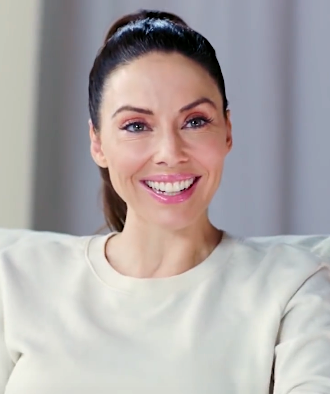
- Cummings in 2019
- Born: September 4, 1982 (age 44); Washington, D.C., U.S.
- Education: University of Pennsylvania (BA)
- Occupations: Actress; comedian; writer; producer; director; podcaster
- Years active: 2004–present
- Children: 1
- Website: whitneycummings.com

Whitney Cummings (born September 4, 1982) is an American actress, comedian, writer, producer, director, and podcaster.

After graduating from the University of Pennsylvania in 2004, Cummings moved to Los Angeles. Cummings co-created the sitcom 2 Broke Girls and starred in and produced the sitcom Whitney. She also directed the comedy film The Female Brain (2017).

She appeared in the low-budget thriller EMR and MTV's Punk'd. She has also performed stand-up comedy, being named one of "10 Comics to Watch" by Variety in 2007 and participating in Comedy Central Roasts of celebrities.

== Early life ==
Cummings was born on September 4, 1982, in Washington, D.C., to Patti Cummings (née Cumming), a native of Texas and a public relations director of Neiman Marcus at Mazza Gallerie; and Eric Lynn Cummings, a lawyer and venture capitalist from West Virginia. She has an older half-brother named Kevin and an older sister named Ashley. Cummings was raised Catholic, but has stated that her mother was Jewish. Her parents divorced when she was five years old.

She has stated that she was raised in a dysfunctional, alcoholic household. At age 12, she temporarily resided with her aunt in Virginia, and spent summers in Harpers Ferry, West Virginia, where her father worked as a manager at the Hill Top House Hotel. Cummings attended St. Andrew's Episcopal School in Potomac, Maryland, graduating in 2000. During high school, she interned at Washington's NBC-owned television station WRC-TV. She studied acting at Washington, D.C.'s Studio Theater.

After high school, Cummings enrolled at the Annenberg School for Communication at the University of Pennsylvania. During this time, she worked as a department store model at local shopping malls. She graduated magna cum laude in 2004 with a degree in communications, and initially aspired to a career as a journalist.

== Career ==
=== 2004–2010: Beginnings ===
Cummings in a 2019 interview

Cummings moved to Los Angeles after college and worked on Punk'd on MTV in 2004. That same year, she starred in the low-budget thriller EMR, which was screened at Cannes. Cummings began performing stand-up in 2004. In 2007, Variety named her one of 10 Comics to Watch in 2007. In 2008, she appeared in the San Francisco audition for Last Comic Standing, although she did not pass the showcase.

She co-starred on The Tony Rock Project and appeared in the 2008 romantic comedy Made of Honor. Beginning in 2007, Cummings appeared as a regular roundtable guest on the E! series Chelsea Lately, and continued to appear until its conclusion in 2014. In 2008, she was named one of 12 Rising Stars of Comedy by Entertainment Weekly. She subsequently appeared as a comedy roaster in the Comedy Central Roasts of Joan Rivers (2009), David Hasselhoff (2010), and Donald Trump (2011).

In August 2010, her first one-hour special, titled Whitney Cummings: Money Shot, premiered on Comedy Central. In 2010, Cummings went on tour with Denis Leary and the Rescue Me Comedy Tour to promote the show's sixth season. She also appeared with Leary on Douchebags and Donuts.

=== 2011–present: Television projects and specials, book ===
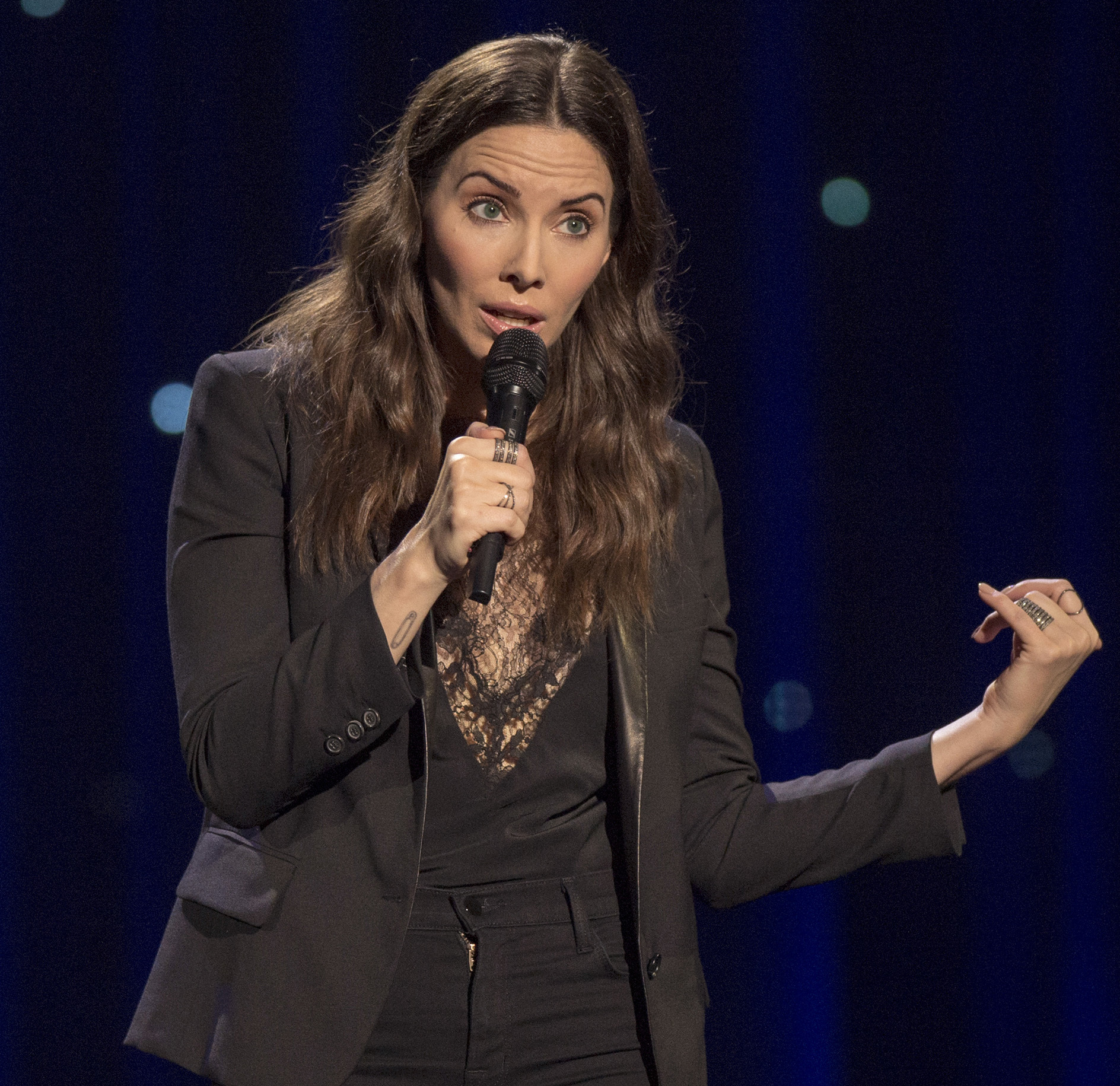
Cummings performing live in 2016

In 2011, two multi-camera, live-audience sitcoms that Cummings created were picked up by broadcast networks: 2 Broke Girls (which she co-created and executive produced with Michael Patrick King) and Whitney (which she starred in, executive produced, and created). Whitney, in which Cummings portrayed a semi-fictionalized version of herself, was not well received by critics, and Cummings acknowledges it was a learning curve for her. The series was canceled after two seasons in May 2013. While still working on the second season of Whitney, Cummings also hosted a talk show, Love You, Mean It with Whitney Cummings, on E! in 2012, which was cancelled after 11 episodes. Cummings later stated that she was overworking herself during this period, and was also in the midst of battling an eating disorder in which she would binge eat followed by compulsive exercise.

In June 2014, Cummings released her second hour-long special, I Love You, on Comedy Central.

Her third hour-long special debuted on HBO in 2016, titled "I'm Your Girlfriend". Reviews were mixed, suggesting it felt less comedic than her previous stand up performances.

Cummings had a supporting role in the thriller Unforgettable (2017), starring Katherine Heigl and Rosario Dawson. The following month, 2 Broke Girls was cancelled after having run six consecutive seasons. Cummings starred in her directorial debut with The Female Brain (2017), an independent comedy film distributed by IFC Films.

Also in 2017, Cummings published her first book, titled I'm Fine...And Other Lies, a collection of personal stories about her life.

Beginning in 2018, Cummings served as one of the head writers, as an executive producer, and overseer of day-to-day production of the revival of the comedy series Roseanne, for ABC. Cummings left the show before its cancelation.

Her fourth hour-long special, Can I Touch It?, was released on July 30, 2019, on Netflix. This special features a robot that Cummings had custom made to look exactly like her, and she brings this robot out at the end of the special.

On November 5, 2019, Cummings launched her first podcast entitled Good for You. Her first guest was actor/producer Dan Levy. Good for You is co-hosted by former assistant and fellow comedian Benton Ray, and features a wide variety of guests, ranging from politicians and comedians to actors and journalists. Fans of the show appreciate Cumming's regular guests, including Nikki Glaser who has featured in multiple episodes, creating the impression of a "highly relatable friendship."

In September 2023, Cummings claimed that she was owed over $350,000 by podcast network Kast Media, who Cummings had been working with since December 2021. Similar claims of non-payment had been made against Kast Media and its CEO Colin Thomson by Jim Cornette, followed by Theo Von, Jason Ellis, Brendan Schaub, Bryan Callen, and Alyx Weiss, who stated they were owed significant money, including several six-figure and seven-figure shortages.

Cummings has a chapter giving advice in Tim Ferriss' book Tools of Titans.

Cummings was the featured guest on the first episode of the podcast Talk Tuah, hosted by Internet personality Haliey Welch, on September 10, 2024.

In a 2024 New York Times feature about Hannah Berner, Cummings was quoted as saying that in the past, "for a woman to even be tolerated in comedy, you had to hate yourself”, and added that being "mean for the sake of a joke" is no longer required to succeed, citing Berner as an example of a sunnier comedian.

In 2025, Cummings participated in Saudi Arabia's Riyadh Comedy Festival, an event which Human Rights Watch characterized as an attempt by the Saudi government to whitewash its human rights abuses. Cummings was one of three women to accept an offer to participate in the festival.

== Personal life ==
Cummings gave birth to a son in December 2023. In November 2025, Cummings got engaged to professional skateboarder Chris Cole.

== Influences ==
Cummings has described her comedic influences beginning with Paul Reiser, who she said "made these hysterical, brilliant commentary about the most mundane things and open it up to a hysterical world". Other important influences for her were George Carlin, who she says challenged her to "question everything". Later influences were Dave Attell ("a legend now but he's very edgy"), Lenny Bruce, and Bill Hicks.

== Filmography ==
=== Film ===
Year	Title	Role	Notes	Ref.
2004	EMR	CyberBunnyLilly		
2006	Hooked	Vanessa	Short film	
2006	Life is Short	Natalie	Short film	
2007	Come to the Net	Whitney	Short film	
2007	7–10 Split	Whitney the Waitress		
2008	Grizzly Park	Tiffany Stone		
2008	Made of Honor	Stephanie		
2009	Why Men Go Gay in L.A.	Sarah		
2010	In Fidelity	Cindy	Short film	
2010	Successful Alcoholics		Short film	
2012	3,2,1... Frankie Go Boom	Claudia		
2015	The Wedding Ringer	Holly Munk		
2015	The Ridiculous 6	Susannah		
2017	Unforgettable	Ali		
2017	The Female Brain	Julia Brizendine	Also writer and director	
2020	The Opening Act	Brooke Bailey		
2021	How It Ends	Mandy		
2022	Studio 666	Samantha		
2022	Good Mourning	Maxine		
2023	At Midnight	Margot Cohen		

=== Television ===
Year	Title	Role	Notes	Ref.
2005	Half and Half	Woman	1 episode	
2006	Fire Guys	Ponytails Pi	1 episode	
2006	Trapped in TV Guide	Series regular	Unknown episodes	
2006	What About Brian	Sally	1 episode	
2007	Tell Me You Love Me	Louise	3 episodes	
2008	Turbo Dates	Sandy	1 episode	
2008–2009	The Tony Rock Project	Sketch Performer	4 episodes	
2009	House	Courtney	Episode: "Here Kitty"	
2011–2013	Whitney	Whitney	38 episodes, also creator, writer, and executive producer	
2011–2017	2 Broke Girls	—N/a	138 episodes, creator, writer, executive producer and executive consultant	
2011	Dave's Old Porn	Guest host	1 episode	
2012–2013	Love You, Mean It	Host	11 episodes, also executive producer	
2014	Comedy Bang! Bang!	Herself	1 episode	
2015	Maron	Herself	2 episodes	
2015	The Jim Gaffigan Show	Herself	1 episode	
2015–2016	Undateable	Charlotte	5 episodes	
2016	Workaholics	Juliette	1 episode	
2018	Crashing	Herself	1 episode	
2018–2019	Funny You Should Ask	Herself	13 episodes	
2021	Tacoma FD	Courtney	1 episode	
2021	The Masked Dancer	Herself (guest panelist)	1 episode	
2021	The Wendy Williams Show	Herself	Guest host	
2022	Conjuring Kesha	Herself	Episode: "Not today, Satan"	
2023	Accused	Brenda	Episode: "Brenda's Story"	
2023	Physical	Rita Bachmann	Episode: "Like a Bitch"	
2023	Cooper's Bar	Britney Lasker	2 episodes	
2024	Fast Friends	Host		
2025	RuPaul's Drag Race	Herself	Guest judge (episode 10)	
2025	Doctor Odyssey	Mona Yeager	Episode: "Double-Booked"	
2026	The View	Herself (guest panelist)	5 episodes	

=== Comedy specials ===
Year	Title	Notes	Ref.
2010	Money Shot	Premiered on Comedy Central	
2014	I Love You	Premiered on Comedy Central	
2016	I'm Your Girlfriend	Premiered on HBO	
2019	Can I Touch It?	Premiered on Netflix	
2022	Jokes	Premiered on Netflix	
2023	Roast of Whitney Cummings	Only Fans TV	
2023	Mouthy	Only Fans TV	

== Bibliography ==
- I'm Fine... And Other Lies. New York: Penguin. 2017. ISBN 978-0-735-21262-6.
