= Nate Bargatze =

American comedian and actor (born 1979)

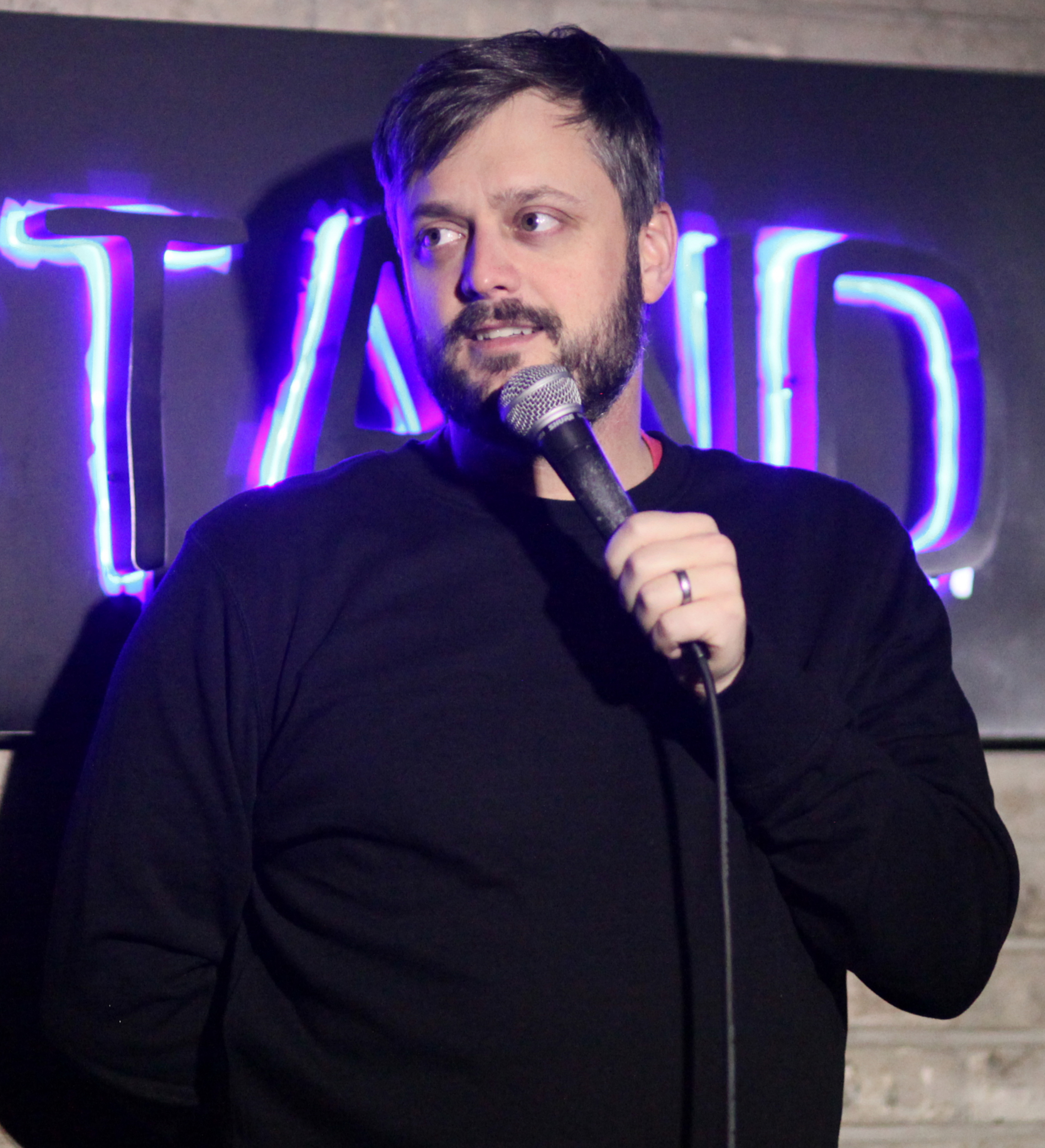
- Bargatze in 2017
- Born: March 25, 1979 (age 47); Nashville, Tennessee, U.S.
- Spouse: Laura Baines (m. 2006)
- Children: 1

Comedy career
- Years active: 2002–present
- Medium: Stand-up; television; film
- Genres: Observational comedy; clean comedy; surreal humor; deadpan; satire
- Subjects: American culture; everyday life; gender differences; human behavior; social awkwardness; pop culture; current events

Nathanael Bargatze (/bɑːrˈɡɛtsi/ bar-GET-see; born March 25, 1979) is an American stand-up comedian and actor. He has been called a clean comedian, and has been noted for his deadpan, monotone delivery. Bargatze was the highest-grossing stand-up comic in 2024, with over a million tickets sold across his shows.

== Early life ==
Bargatze was born in Nashville, Tennessee, to Carol and Stephen Bargatze, on March 25, 1979. Stephen was a clown, member of the International Brotherhood of Magicians, and motivational speaker, while Carol worked in the ticket office for the Vanderbilt Commodores. After a troubled childhood, Stephen had initially studied to become a preacher, but ultimately graduated from Trevecca Nazarene College with a bachelor's degree in education, 10 years after leaving high school.

Raised in a devoutly religious Christian household, Bargatze is one of three children. His father practiced magic tricks with him while growing up, and Bargatze stated he performed in skits with his church group, beginning when he "was around 11". He attended DuPont Elementary in Old Hickory, Tennessee until fourth grade, when he transferred to Donelson Christian Academy (DCA) in Nashville, where his father had a day job as a history teacher. He competed in track and field at DCA and tried out for the basketball and golf teams, but was cut from both. He graduated in 1997.

Bargatze then attended Volunteer State Community College in nearby Gallatin for a year. During this time, he had various jobs, such as working in construction, manning a cellphone kiosk at Walmart, and delivering furniture. He enrolled in Western Kentucky University, but flunked each of his courses and dropped out. He also had a stint working at Applebee's and later landed a job as a meter-reader for a water company in Mount Juliet, Tennessee. He was a fan of The Bob & Tom Show, a radio program which often hosted comedians, and it inspired him to become a comedian himself. One of his fellow meter-readers, Michael Clay, also had an ambition to become a comedian, and together they decided to quit their jobs and both pursue a comedy career. Bargatze's parents were supportive of his decision and attended his first open mic event.

== Career ==
=== Early years ===
Bargatze began his comedy career in 2002, and moved to Chicago to attend The Second City, an improvisational comedy troupe. He soon decided against improv and instead enrolled in Jim Rauth's Comedy College, which focused on stand-up comedy. At this time, Bargatze rented a basement apartment with his former co-worker Michael Clay and worked as a waiter at a nearby bar. He performed fill-in spots at Zanies Comedy Club in Chicago, and also performed at Zanies Nashville.

In 2004, Bargatze moved to New York City, where he became a barker for the Boston Comedy Club, handing out flyers in Greenwich Village in exchange for stage time at night in the club. Bargatze also worked as a dogwalker and a FedEx delivery driver during the day to support his comedy career. He has called the Jerry Seinfeld documentary Comedian (2002) "life-changing" and a "big reason" why he moved to New York. While at the Boston Comedy Club, he saw comedians such as Dave Chappelle, Louis C.K., Patrice O'Neal, and Bill Burr perform live. Bargatze stated that it took "about a year" before he received a paying gig in New York. He spent most of his early years performing for single-digit crowds.

Bargatze had a turning-point year in 2008, featuring on Comedy Central's stand-up show Live at Gotham, Late Night with Conan O'Brien, and the Just for Laughs comedy festival in Montreal. He toured extensively with the USO, performing for American troops stationed in countries such as the Bahamas, Greenland, Honduras, Iraq, and Kuwait. He co-hosted a podcast, It Could Be Better, with Chris Laker and Yannis Pappas from 2009 to 2013. He won both New York's Comedy Festival and the Boston Comedy Festival in 2010, and released his first 30-minute special in 2011, as part of an episode of Comedy Central Presents.

Bargatze decided to move to Los Angeles in 2012, taking inspiration from Jerry Weintraub's quote "as soon as you feel comfortable that's when it's time to start over". He released his first comedy album, Yelled At By A Clown, in 2012 on Aspecialthing Records. It was on the Billboard Top Ten Comedy Charts for two weeks, peaking at No. 2. Bargatze received effusive praise from Marc Maron, and appeared on the WTF with Marc Maron podcast in 2012. He was booked on Late Night with Jimmy Fallon in 2013. He also was part of Jimmy Fallon's Clean Cut Comedy Tour that year. Speaking of his participation in the tour and his choice to be a clean comedian, Bargatze said: "I grew up watching clean comedy. Starting out, I wanted my parents to come watch me. I still think that way, even though I'm a parent now. I'm a clean comic, but I don't really want people to notice it. ... A good compliment for me would be, 'I didn't even notice that you were clean.' That's my goal."

In 2014, Bargatze developed a deal with NBC Universal to create a sitcom based on his life, with Fallon serving as producer. NBC ultimately scrapped the project. Also in 2014, he auditioned for The Daily Show and made it to a final shortlist of two. Jordan Klepper was hired instead of Bargatze. After two years in Los Angeles, Bargatze returned home to Nashville, deeming it more suitable for his wife and daughter. He initially kept the move to Nashville quiet as he did not want people in the industry to think he had quit comedy. His first hour-long special, Full Time Magic, was released in 2015 by Comedy Central. The album version of Full Time Magic reached No. 1 on the Billboard Top Ten Comedy Charts. The special premiered on the same night as Floyd Mayweather Jr. vs. Manny Pacquiao. Bargatze said, "Nobody watched my special that night. I didn't even watch it, since I wanted to see that fight so bad."

=== Breakthrough ===
Bargatze had a breakthrough in 2017, when Netflix launched The Standups, a series with each episode containing a 30-minute set by a different stand-up comedian. Bargatze was featured in the first episode. He said it "changed everything" and that there was a significant increase in attendance at his first gig following the episode's release. In 2019, Bargatze released an hour-long special, The Tennessee Kid, on Netflix. Sarah Aswell of Forbes named it as the best comedy special of the year. Also in 2019, Bargatze filmed a pilot of a multi-cam sitcom for ABC based on his life. Katie Aselton, Debra Jo Rupp, and Kurtwood Smith were cast as Bargatze's on-screen wife, mother, and father, respectively. The pilot was not picked up. Bargatze recalled in 2024 that "I don't think there was a lot of entertainment made for people not on the coasts during that period," and said that while his subsequent success led to renewed interest from networks, "I don't know if I'd do a sitcom now."

Bargatze began hosting The Nateland Podcast in 2020 along with Brian "Breakfast" Bates and Aaron Weber; in 2022, Dusty Slay joined as a fourth host. Netflix released Bargatze's next stand-up special, The Greatest Average American, in 2021. It was filmed outdoors at Universal Studios Hollywood and was nominated for the 2022 Grammy Award for Best Comedy Album. Also in 2021, Bargatze was featured in an article in The Atlantic that called him "The Nicest Man in Stand-Up". In 2022, he voiced the character Grady in the Portal spinoff game Aperture Desk Job.

Bargatze's stand-up special Hello World, filmed at the Celebrity Theater in Phoenix, Arizona, was released in January 2023 on Amazon Prime Video. It set a record for Amazon's most-streamed original comedy special, receiving 2.9 million viewers in its first 28 days. On April 15, 2023, Bargatze drew 19,365 attendees to a performance at Nashville's Bridgestone Arena, breaking the venue's all-time attendance record. Bargatze stated that after his show he took a chair from the arena to his house to prevent anyone from breaking his record.

Bargatze hosted Saturday Night Live for the first time on October 28, 2023, and for a second time on October 5, 2024. In those appearances, he attracted attention for his portrayal of George Washington in sketches that mock the American language and system of measurements. Also in 2024, he performed at the Netflix Is a Joke Festival at the Hollywood Bowl. Bargatze said hosting SNL led to a "giant, giant leap" in his career. He was the highest-grossing comic in 2024 according to Pollstar. He topped Billboard's Boxscore ranking of the highest-grossing comedy tours, with $82.2 million gross income from 1.1 million tickets sold across his 148 shows, setting a new record for largest one-year gross by a comedy performer in Boxscore history. Bargatze returned to Netflix to release his next special, titled Your Friend, Nate Bargatze, which premiered on Christmas Eve 2024. It received the 2025 Grammy Award for Best Comedy Album.

Bargatze hosted the 77th Primetime Emmy Awards in September 2025. During the ceremony, he introduced a $100,000 donation counter to the Boys & Girls Clubs of America that would be reduced by $1,000 for every second that an award winner's speech exceeded 45 seconds. This resulted in controversy, with criticism that the money counter "overshadowed" the winners' speeches; Bargatze later personally donated $250,000 after the counter had reached $0. Bargatze had the highest-grossing comedy tour of 2025 according to Billboard's Boxscore rankings, with gross income of $56.7 million from 677,000 tickets sold across his 76 shows.

=== Expansion ===
In March 2025, Bargatze stated that he would make his first feature acting role in The Breadwinner, a film he co-wrote with Dan Lagana. It was released on May 29, 2026. David Sims of The Atlantic described the film as "essentially a modern update of the 1980s hit Mr. Mom ... The concept was already mildly stale in 1983; in 2026, jokes about Nate learning to use a toaster or a GPS come off as well past their expiration date." The Breadwinner was unprofitable during its box office run, generating $20.2 million against a $25 million production budget.

Bargatze began hosting The Greatest Average American, a game show on ABC, in February 2026. Named after his comedy special, the show was produced by Bargatze's media company, Nateland Entertainment, alongside Walt Disney Television Alternative and John Quinn's Da Da Productions.

=== Influences ===
Bargatze has named Jerry Seinfeld, Steve Martin, Brian Regan, Bob Newhart, and Bill Cosby as being some of his comedic influences.

== Personal life ==
Bargatze married Laura Baines on October 13, 2006. They met while working at an Applebee's on Thompson Lane in Nashville, Tennessee. They have a daughter and live in Nashville. Bargatze is a Christian. He avoids discussing politics.

Although he did not attend Vanderbilt University, Bargatze has been a lifelong fan of the Vanderbilt Commodores. Bargatze's second cousin, Ronnie Bargatze, was an athlete who became a basketball coach at Vanderbilt in the 1970s and was inducted into the TSSAA Hall of Fame in 2018.

Bargatze drank heavily while starting out as a comedian and has said he was close to sabotaging his career due to alcoholism. He stated in 2024 that he had stopped drinking alcohol in 2018, recalling: "I wasn't able to drink like a regular person."

An avid golfer, Bargatze participated in the pro–am of the Simmons Bank Open golf tournament in 2023. He is friends with professional golfer Brandt Snedeker. Bargatze also competed in the AT&T Pebble Beach Pro-Am in 2023, where he was listed as a 7 handicap.

In 2024, Bargatze contributed $1.15 million to the development of an indoor athletic facility at Donelson Christian Academy, his alma mater. The school subsequently named the facility in honor of him. Bargatze stated in 2025 that he wants to build a theme park in Nashville similar to Opryland USA, where he worked at as a teenager before its closure in 1997.

Bargatze attended the UFC Freedom 250 event held at the White House.

== Filmography ==
=== Film ===
Year	Title	Role	Notes	Refs.
2025	Are We Good?	Himself	Documentary film	
2025	The New Yorker at 100	Himself	Documentary film	
2026	The Breadwinner	Nate Wilcox	Also writer and producer	

=== Television ===
Year	Title	Role	Notes	Refs.
2008–2009	Late Night with Conan O'Brien	Himself	2 episodes	
2011–2013	Conan	Self / Comic guest	3 episodes	
2013	Late Night with Jimmy Fallon	Self (guest)	2 episodes	
2014–2023	The Tonight Show Starring Jimmy Fallon	Self (guest)	13 episodes	
2014	Maron	Self	Episode: "Radio Cowboy"	
2017	The Standups	Self (standup)	1 Episode: "Nate Bargatze"	
2023	Late Night with Seth Meyers	Self (guest)	2 episodes	
2023, 2024	Saturday Night Live	Self (host)	Episodes: "Nate Bargatze / Foo Fighters" "Nate Bargatze / Coldplay"	
2024	John Mulaney Presents: Everybody's in LA	Himself (guest)	Episode: "Helicopters"	
2024	Nate Bargatze's Nashville Christmas	Himself (host)	1 episode	
2025	77th Primetime Emmy Awards	Himself (host)	Television special	
2026	The Greatest Average American	Himself (host)		

=== Standup specials ===
Year	Title	Network	Refs.
2011	Comedy Central Presents	Comedy Central	
2015	Full Time Magic	Comedy Central	
2019	The Tennessee Kid	Netflix	
2021	The Greatest Average American	Netflix	
2023	Hello World	Amazon Prime Video	
2024	Your Friend, Nate Bargatze	Netflix	

== Awards and nominations ==
Year	Award	Category	Nominated work	Result	Ref.
2021	Grammy Awards	Best Comedy Album	The Greatest Average American	Nominated	
2026	Grammy Awards	Best Comedy Album	Your Friend, Nate Bargatze	Won	
2025	Primetime Emmy Awards	Outstanding Variety Special (Pre-Recorded)	Your Friend, Nate Bargatze	Nominated	
2025	Primetime Emmy Awards	Outstanding Writing for a Variety Special	Your Friend, Nate Bargatze	Nominated	

== Discography ==
- Yelled At By a Clown (Aspecialthing Records, 2012)
- Full Time Magic (Comedy Central, 2015)
- The Tennessee Kid (Netflix, 2019)
- The Greatest Average American (Netflix, 2021)
- Hello World (Amazon Prime Video, 2023)
- Your Friend, Nate Bargatze (Netflix, 2024)

== Bibliography ==
- Big Dumb Eyes: Stories from a Simpler Mind (Grand Central Publishing, 2025)
