= Deon Cole =

American comedian, actor, and screenwriter (born 1972)

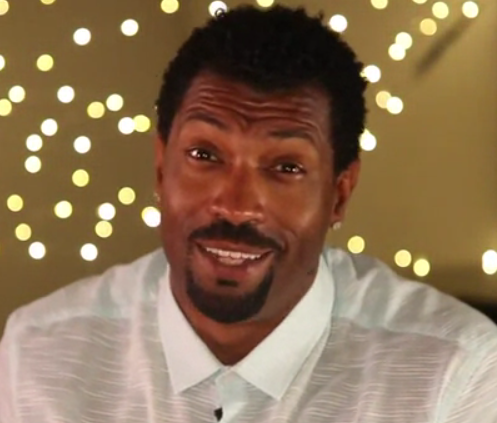
- Cole in 2016
- Born: Deon Anthony Cole; January 9, 1972 (age 54); Chicago, Illinois, U.S.
- Education: Thornridge High School; Philander Smith College
- Occupations: Actor; comedian; screenwriter
- Years active: 1997–present
- Children: 1
- Website: deoncole.com

Deon Anthony Cole (born January 9, 1972) is an American actor, comedian and screenwriter. He is best known for his role in the sitcom Black-ish (2014–2022), which earned him nominations for two NAACP Image Awards and two Screen Actors Guild Awards. On June 25, 2020, he became the second panelist to win the Doris Award on the ABC version of To Tell the Truth. He stars in Average Joe.

Cole was nominated for two Primetime Emmy Awards for co-writing the late-night talk shows The Tonight Show with Conan O'Brien and Conan; for the latter, he was also nominated for three Writers Guild of America Awards.

== Early life ==
Cole was born on January 9, 1972, in Roseland in Chicago. He was educated at Thornridge High School and earned an acting degree from Philander Smith College.

== Career ==
Cole started his career in comedy after a friend bet him $50 that he would not get up on stage one night in Chicago. Cole was on the writing staff for The Tonight Show with Conan O'Brien from 2009 to 2010, and he worked as a writer for Conan from 2010 to 2012. He has appeared frequently in comedic bits for both broadcasts, and he has, along with the rest of the staff, received two Primetime Emmy nominations. Cole also performed on Conan O'Brien's "The Legally Prohibited from Being Funny on Television Tour" in 2010.

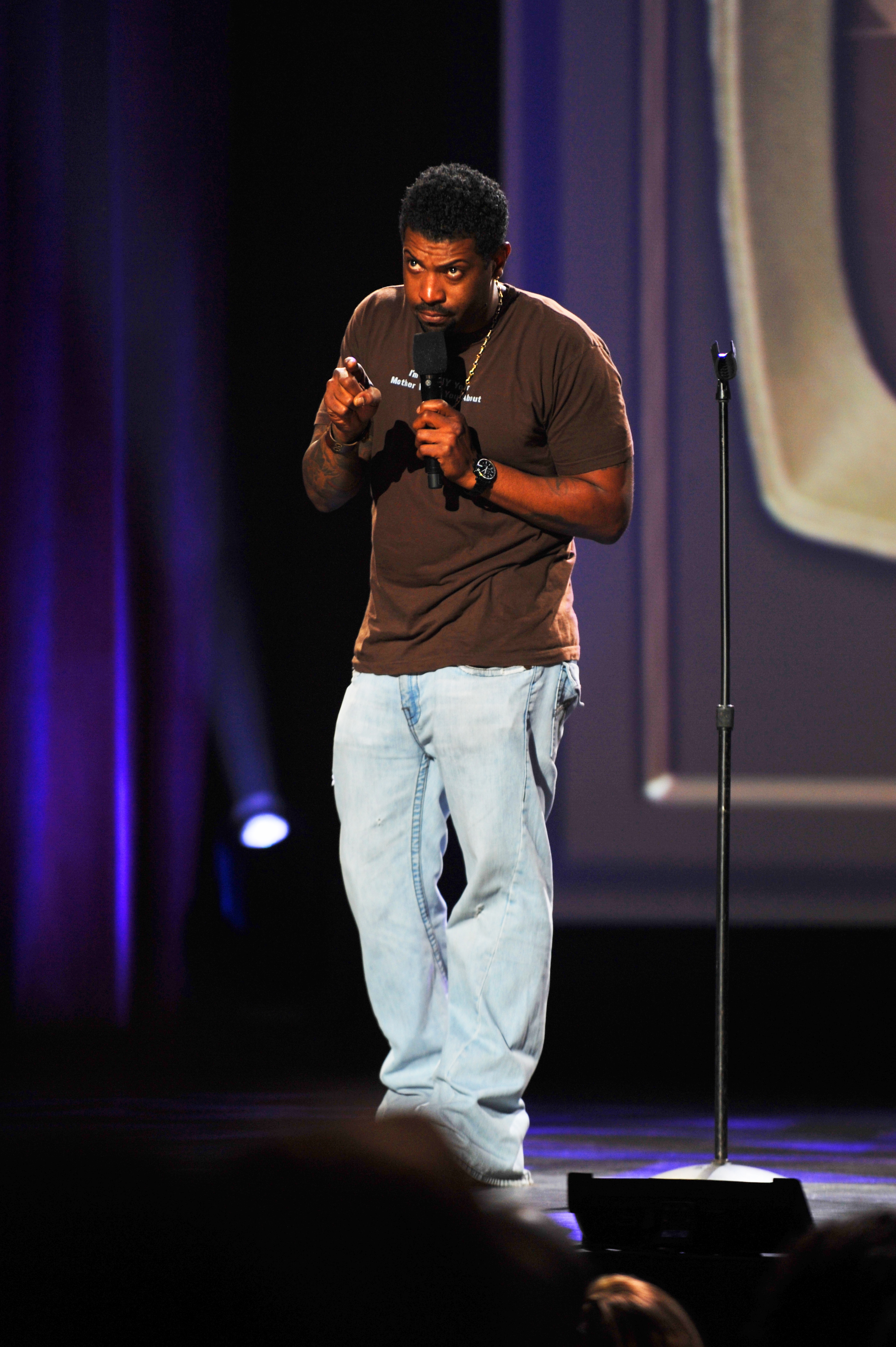
Cole performing in 2011

In February 2010, Cole performed on Comic Aid Haiti, a comedy performance that benefited victims of the 2010 Haiti earthquake. Cole has performed stand up on other programs such as John Oliver's New York Stand-Up Show, Mash Up and Lopez Tonight. Cole created his own production company, Cole Blooded, to produce the sketch comedy show Deon Cole's Black Box. It premiered on TBS, on June 10, 2013, but was canceled on October 25, 2013.

Cole had a recurring role on the ABC sitcom Black-ish as Charlie Telphy. He was promoted to a main role in season 4. He later made several appearances in Black-ish's spin-off Grown-ish. Cole was cast on Angie Tribeca from 2016 to 2018. Cole hosted the game show Face Value on BET in 2017. That year, he also performed in a half-hour set in the Netflix original series The Standups.

In October 2019, Netflix released a stand-up special called Deon Cole: Cole Hearted. Since 2019, Cole has been a part of a television ad campaign for Old Spice body wash, alongside actress/comedian Gabrielle Dennis.

On June 25, 2020, Cole appeared on To Tell the Truth and won the Doris Award, becoming the second panelist to do so.

On May 6, 2023, Cole received an Honorary Doctorate of Humane Letters from his alma mater Philander Smith College in Little Rock, Arkansas.

== Personal life ==
Cole has a son, Dylan. Cole is a single parent who keeps things private regarding his son's mother.

== Filmography ==
=== Film ===
Year	Title	Role	Notes
2002	Barbershop	Dante	
2003	A Lover for My Husband	Cab Driver	
2004	Barbershop 2: Back in Business	Dante	
2005	The Evil One	Dejuan	Video
2005	A Get2Gether	Jesse	
2016	Barbershop: The Next Cut	Dante	
2017	The Female Brain	Steven	
2019	Holiday Rush	Marshall Stone	
2020	2 Minutes of Fame	Nico	
2020	Friendsgiving	Dan	
2021	I'm Fine (Thanks for Asking)	Chad	
2021	Welcome Matt	Norman	
2021	The Harder They Fall	Wiley Escoe	
2023	You People	Demetrius	
2023	A Snowy Day in Oakland	Davis	
2023	The Color Purple	Alfonso Harris	
2026	Michael	Don King	Debut film
2026	Scary Movie	Pastor Prime	
TBA	Grown Ups 3	Bobby	Filming

=== Television ===
Year	Title	Role	Notes
2003	Laffapalooza	Himself	Episode: "Laffapalooza Volume 5"
2005	The World Stands Up	Himself	Episode: "Episode #2.1" & "#2.11"
2005–09	1st Amendment Stand Up	Himself	Recurring Guest
2006	Def Comedy Jam	Himself	Episode: "Episode #7.10"
2007	Comedy Central Presents	Himself	Episode: "Deon Cole"
2007	Wild 'n Out	Himself	Main Cast: Season 4
2007	Nick Cannon Presents: Short Circuitz	The Negotiator Sketch	Episode: "Episode #1.1"
2008	The Funny Spot	Himself	Episode: "Episode #1.1"
2010	John Oliver's New York Stand-Up Show	Himself	Episode:"Episode #2.2
2010–19	Laugh Factory	Himself	Recurring Guest
2011	Funny as Hell	Himself	Episode: "Episode #1.2"
2011	New York Stand-Up Show	Himself	Episode: "Episode #2.2" & "#2.3"
2011	The League	Mugger	Episode: "The Light of Genesis"
2012	Mash Up	Himself	Episode: "Episode #1.2"
2012	ComicView	Himself	Episode: "Kevin Hart/Deon Cole/Felipe Esparza"
2013	Deon Cole's Black Box	Himself/Host	Main Host
2013	In Bed with Joan	Himself	Episode: "Deon Cole"
2013–14	@midnight	Himself	Episode: "Episode #1.4" & "#2.79"
2014	Mind of a Man	Himself/Panelist	Recurring Panelist
2014	Benched	Diamond	Episode: "Diamond is a Girl's Worst Friend"
2014–22	Black-ish	Charlie Telphy	Recurring Cast: Season 1-3, Main Cast: Season 4-8
2015	The Nightly Show with Larry Wilmore	Himself/Panelist	Episode: "Joe Biden's Rumored Presidential Run"
2015	The Soup	Himself	Episode: "Episode #12.35"
2016–18	Angie Tribeca	Det. Daniel "DJ" Tanner	Main Cast: Season 1-3, Guest: Season 4
2017	Annual Trumpet Awards	Himself/Co-Host	Main Co-Host
2017	The Standups	Himself	Episode: "With Deon Cole"
2017	All Def Comedy	Himself	Episode: "Episode #1.6"
2017	Face Value	Himself/Host	Main Host
2017–19	Hip Hop Squares	Himself/Panelist	Recurring Guest
2018	Lip Sync Battle	Himself/Competitor	Episode: "Karrueche Tran vs. Deon Cole"
2018	Wild 'n Out	Himself/Co-Team Captain	Episode: "Trevor Jackson/Deon Cole"
2018	All About the Washingtons	Darnell Bell	Episode: "You Gots the Chills"
2018–22	Grown-ish	Charlie Telphy	Main Cast: Season 1-2, Recurring Cast: Season 3-4
2019	A Black Lady Sketch Show	Pastor Venmo Stacks	Episode: "Why Are Her Pies Wet, Lord?"
2020	The Cabin with Bert Kreischer	Himself	Episode: "No Pain, No Gain"
2020	I Can See Your Voice	Himself/Panelist	Episode: "Episode #1.7"
2020	Kipo and the Age of Wonderbeasts	Dave (voice)	Main Cast
2020–21	To Tell the Truth	Himself/Panelist	Recurring Guest
2021	Soul of a Nation	Himself	Recurring Guest: Season 1
2021	Celebrity Family Feud	Himself/Celebrity Contestant	Episode: "Episode #8.7"
2021	South Side	Malachi Washington-Carter	Episode: "Chicago's #1 Party Promoter"
2021–22	To Tell the Truth	Himself/Co-Host	Main Co-Host
2022	So Dumb It's Criminal: Hosted by Snoop Dogg	Himself	Episode: "Luce Stools" & "Less Than Decent Exposure"
2022	Urban Eats and Treats	Himself	Episode: "Deon Cole"
2022	Juneteenth: A Global Celebration for Freedom	Himself/Host	Main Host
2022	Celebrity Game Face	Himself	Episode: "Kevin's BFFs"
2022	Uncensored	Himself	Episode: "Deon Cole"
2022	Soul Train Music Awards	Himself/Host	Main Host
2023	Black Pop: Celebrating the Power of Black Culture	Himself	Recurring Guest
2023	The $100,000 Pyramid	Himself/Celebrity Player	Episode: "Episode #6.13"
2023	See It Loud: The History of Black Television	Himself	Recurring Guest
2023	Name That Tune	Himself/Contestant	Episode: "Tunes and the City"
2023	Celebrity Squares	Himself	Episode: "Your Butt, Your Choice America"
2023	Average Joe	Joe Washington	Main Cast
2024	The Madness	Kwesi	Recurring Cast
2025	Lil Kev	Uncle Richard Jr. (voice)	Recurring Cast
2025	Survival of the Thickest	Lamar	Recurring Cast: Season 2
2025	Crutch	Caleb	Episode: "Legal Crutch"

=== Comedy specials ===
Year	Title
2016	Deon Cole: Cole Blooded Seminar
2019	Deon Cole: Cole Hearted
2022	Deon Cole: Charleen's Boy
2024	Deon Cole: Ok, Mister
