= Louann Brizendine =

American neuroscientist

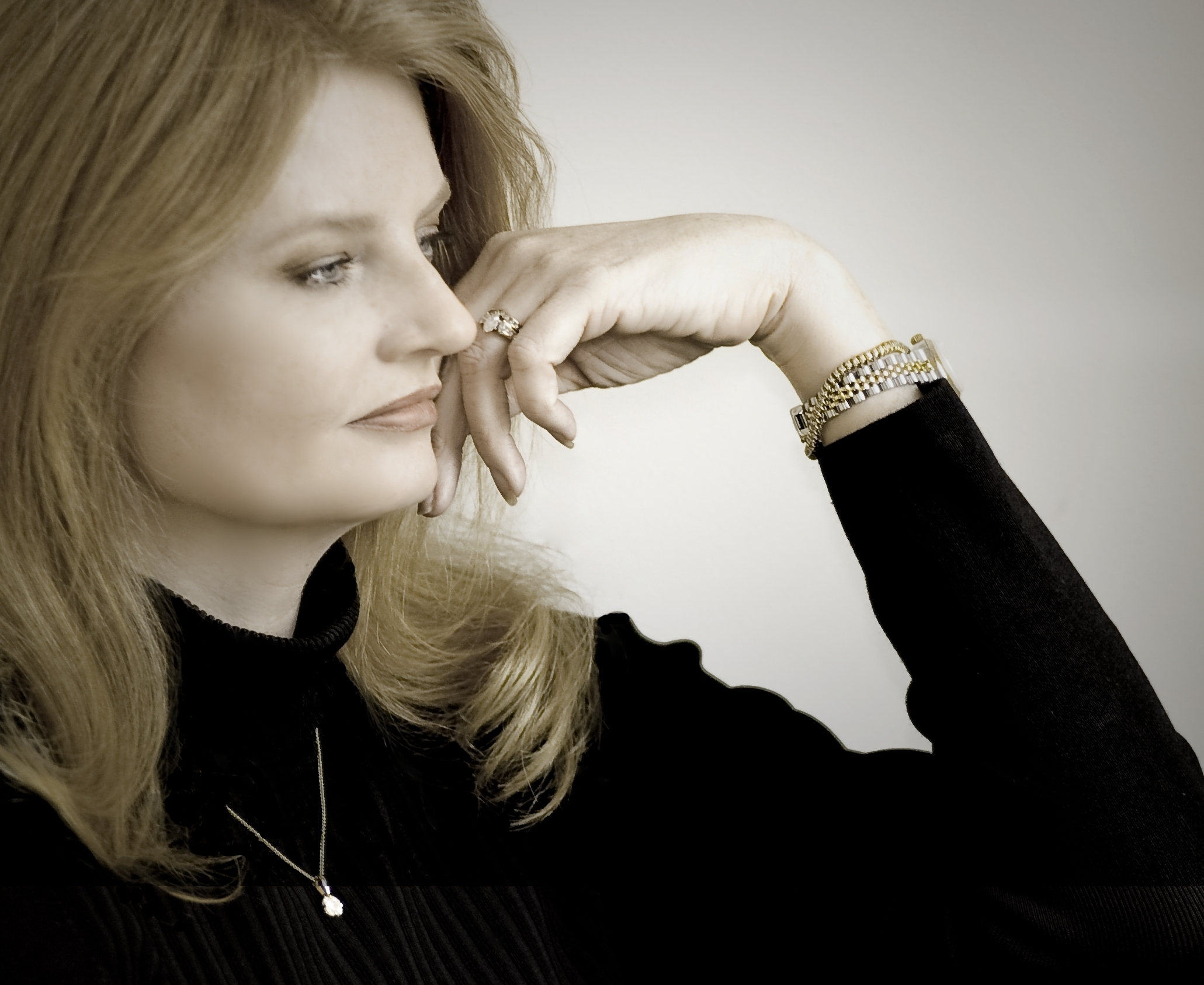
- Louann Brizendine in 2009.
- Born: December 30, 1952 (age 73); Hazard, Kentucky, United States
- Citizenship: USA
- Alma mater: UC Berkeley, Yale School of Medicine, Harvard Medical School
- Known for: Research on the effect of reproductive hormones on the brain and behavior
- Scientific career
- Fields: Medicine

Louann Brizendine (born December 30, 1952) is an American scientist, a neuropsychiatrist who is both a researcher and a clinician and professor at the University of California, San Francisco (UCSF). She is the author of three books: The Female Brain (2006), The Male Brain (2010), and The Upgrade (2022).

== Education ==
Brizendine did her undergraduate work from 1972 to 1976 at UC Berkeley, where she received a Bachelor of Arts in neurobiology. She studied for her MD from 1976 to 1981 at the Yale School of Medicine. She subsequently did a residency in psychiatry, MMHC, from 1982 to 1985 at the Harvard Medical School.

== Research and career ==
Brizendine's research concerns women's moods and hormones. She graduated in neurobiology from UC Berkeley, attended Yale School of Medicine, and completed a residency in psychiatry at Harvard Medical School. She is board-certified in psychiatry and neurology and is an endowed clinical professor. She joined the faculty of UCSF Medical Center at the Langley Porter Psychiatric Institute in 1988, and now holds the Lynne and Marc Benioff-endowed chair of psychiatry.

In 1994, Brizendine founded the UCSF Women's Mood and Hormone Clinic, and continues to serve as its director.

== Writing ==
Brizendine's book The Female Brain was reviewed both positively and negatively, especially one piece of content pertaining to linguistics and language. She later acknowledged that this book overemphasized gender-based differences, saying: "Males and females are more alike than they're different. After all, we are the same species".

The Female Brain was loosely adapted as a romantic comedy movie of the same name in 2017. Brizendine served as the inspiration for the film's main character.

She has also written The Male Brain and admitted that her books emphasize the differences between men and women, which has led to her "best-selling" success.

== Publications ==
- The Female Brain. Morgan Road/Broadway Books. 2006. ISBN 978-0-7679-2009-4.
- The Male Brain. Three Rivers Press/Crown Publishing. 2010. ISBN 978-0-7679-2754-3.
- The Upgrade: How the Female Brain Gets Stronger and Better in Midlife and Beyond. Hay House UK. 2022. ISBN 0525577173.
