= BET's Top 25 =

- Country of origin: United States

Production
- Running time: 1 hour

Original release
- Network: BET
- Release: September 22, 2001 – 2008

BET's Top 25 is a countdown show that features top 25 favorites such as top 25 men/women, dances, actors, rappers, etc., with commentary from industry insiders.

A January 2006 episode was hosted by Paul Mooney and covered the top 25 worst moments in African-American history. Mooney hosted an episode titled "Top 25 Events That (mis) Shaped Black America" in February 2007. An April 2007 episode was hosted by Chris Brown and Fatima Robinson and covered the top 25 dancers.

== BET's Top 25 Hottest Men of the Last 25 Years ==
- 25. Morris Chestnut
- 24. Terrence Howard
- 23. Ice Cube
- 22. Nick Cannon
- 21. Omarion
- 20. Nelly
- 19. Blair Underwood
- 18. Pooch Hall
- 17. Eric Benet
- 16. Pharrell
- 15. Boris Kodjoe
- 14. Biggie
- 13. Jermane Jackson, Jr.
- 12. Matthew Wu
- 11. Larenz Tate
- 10. Lil Romeo
- 9. LL Cool J
- 8. Marques Houston
- 7. T.I.
- 6. Jamie Foxx
- 5. 50 Cent
- 4. sean wing
- 3. Allen Iverson
- 2. Idris Elba
- 1 Will Smith

== BET's Top 25 Hottest Women of the Last 25 Years ==
- 25. Lauryn Hill
- 24. The cast of Girlfriends
- 23. Mo'Nique
- 22. Toni Braxton
- 21. Lil' Kim
- 20. Vivica A. Fox
- 19. Kelly Rowland
- 18. Tina Turner
- 17. LisaRaye
- 16. Stacey Dash
- 15. Vanessa L. Williams
- 14. Ashanti
- 13. Mary J. Blige
- 12. Nia Long
- 11. Jada Pinkett Smith
- 10. Pam Grier
- 9. Alicia Keys
- 8. Gabrielle Union
- 7. Ciara
- 6. Mariah Carey
- 5. Pam Grier
- 4. Aaliyah
- 3. Janet Jackson
- 2. Beyoncé
- 1. Halle Berry

== BET Top 25 Hottest Bodies Of All Time ==
- 25. Omarion
- 24. Tracee Ellis Ross
- 23. Morris Chestnut
- 22. Ciara
- 21. Usher
- 20. Serena Williams
- 19. Will Smith
- 18. Roselyn Sanchez
- 17. Henry Simmons
- 16. Tocarra
- 15. Rihanna
- 14. Gabrielle Union
- 13. Tyrese
- 12. LisaRaye
- 11. The Rock
- 10. Tyra Banks
- 09. 50 Cent
- 08. Melyssa Ford
- 07. Nelly
- 06. Halle Berry
- 05. Terrell Owens
- 04. Jennifer Lopez
- 03. Tyson Beckford
- 02. LL Cool J
- 01. Beyoncé

== BET Top 25 Couples of All Time ==
- 25. Ashanti and Nelly
- 24. Lisa Bonet and Lenny Kravitz
- 23. Biggie and Faith Evans/Lil' Kim
- 22. Duane Martin and Tisha Campbell
- 21. Left Eye and Andre Rison
- 20. Aaliyah and Damon Dash
- 19. Nicole Ari Parker and Boris Kodjoe
- 18. Usher and Chilli
- 17. 50 Cent and Vivica Fox
- 16. Mary J. Blige and K-Ci
- 15. Nick Cannon and Christina Milian
- 14. Andre 3000 and Erykah Badu
- 13. Tyra Banks and John Singleton
- 12. Oprah and Stedman Graham
- 11. Kelis and Nas
- 10. Robin Givens and Mike Tyson
- 09. Russell Simmons and Kimora
- 08. Janet Jackson and Jermaine Dupri
- 07. Halle Berry and Eric Benet
- 06. Ciara and Bow Wow
- 05. Will Smith and Jada Pinkett Smith
- 04. Diddy and Jennifer Lopez
- 03. Whitney Houston and Bobby Brown
- 02. Gabrielle Union and Dwyane Wade
- 01. Beyoncé and Jay Z

== BET's Top 25 Dancers of all time ==
- 25. Bobby Brown
- 24. Diddy
- 23. Big Daddy Kane
- 22. Rosie Perez
- 21. Gregory Hines
- 20. Missy Elliott
- 19. Tina Turner
- 18. Aaliyah
- 17. Cab Calloway
- 16. Shakira
- 15. Omarion
- 14. Bobby Brown
- 13. Jennifer Lopez
- 12. Alvin Ailey
- 11. Usher
- 10. The Temptations
- 09. Beyoncé
- 08. Savion Glover
- 07. MC Hammer
- 06. Prince
- 05. Janet Jackson
- 04. Ciara
- 03. Chris Brown
- 02. Michael Jackson
- 01. James Brown

== BET's Top 25 Under 25 ==
- 26. Cupid
- 25. T-Pain
- 24. Ciara
- 23. Vince Young
- 22. Evan Ross
- 21. Ne-Yo
- 20. Columbus Short
- 19. Jurnee Smollett
- 18. Romeo
- 17. Keke Palmer
- 16. Tyler James Williams
- 15. Brandon T. Jackson
- 14. Trey Smith, Jaden Smith, and Willow Smith
- 13. Lil' JJ
- 12. America Ferrera
- 11. Rihanna
- 10. Lauren London
- 09. Omarion
- 08. Keke Palmer
- 07. Reggie Bush
- 06. Vanessa Simmons and Angela Simmons
- 05. Bow Wow
- 04. Lil Wayne
- 03. abdirahman-nuune
- 02. LeBron James
- 01. Chris Brown and Cupid
