= The Female Brain (book) =

2006 non-fiction book by Louann Brizendine

- First edition
- Author: Louann Brizendine
- Publisher: Morgan Road Books
- Publication date: 2006
- Media type: Print (hardcover)
- Pages: 187, 210 including notes.
- ISBN: 0-7679-2009-0
- OCLC: 63660885
- Dewey Decimal: 612.8 22
- LC Class: QP376 .B755 2006

The Female Brain is a book written by the American neuropsychiatrist Louann Brizendine in 2006. The main thesis of the book is that women's behavior is different from that of men due, in large measure, to hormonal differences. The book was a commercial success but received mixed reviews due to questions about its scientific validity. The author has been criticized for unsubstantiated claims and irrelevant citations.

== Structure ==
Brizendine's main thesis is that the human female brain is affected by the following hormones: estrogen, progesterone, testosterone, oxytocin, neurotransmitters (dopamine, serotonin), and that there are differences in the architecture of the brain (prefrontal cortex, hypothalamus, amygdala) that regulate such hormones and neurotransmitters. The book has seven chapters, each one of which is dedicated to a specific part of a woman's life, such as puberty, motherhood, and menopause, or a specific dimension of a women's emotional life, such as feelings, love and trust, and sex. The book also includes three appendices on hormone therapy, postpartum depression, and sexual orientation.

== Reception ==
The book sold well but received mixed reviews because a number of journalists, popular science writers, and scientists questioned the validity of some of the content.

Some of the authors that supported the content of the book include:

- Sarah Hrdy, researcher, author of Mother Nature and PhD in anthropology.
- Daniel Goleman, journalist and author of Emotional Intelligence

Some of the authors that criticized the content of the book include:

- Deborah Tannen, of The Washington Post Tannen writes, "Throughout the book, I recognized biological accounts for social behaviors I had observed and written about." In a similar vein, she adds, "Anthropologists and linguists who have studied children at play have noted that girls form bonds by telling secrets. Here, too, Brizendine finds 'a biological reason.'" Her ultimate position is one of cautionary endorsement: "Ideally, readers will sift through the case studies, research findings and scientific conjectures gathered in this non-technical book and be intrigued by some while questioning others, bearing in mind the caution that hormones and brain structure play a role in gender differences but are not the whole story."
- Evan Balaban, professor of psychology at McGill University, and Rebecca Jordan-Young, in a review in Nature.
- Cordelia Fine, in her book Delusions of Gender.
- Benjamin Radford.
- Robin Marantz Henig in The New York Times.

Brizendine was given the tongue-in-cheek 2006 Becky Award, for "outstanding contributions to linguistic misinformation". The award cited errors in The Female Brain, including one sentence (removed from subsequent printings) which contrasted the number of words used by men and women in one day. The numbers had been taken from a book by a self-help guru and were incorrect.

== In other media ==
The Female Brain was loosely adapted as a romantic comedy movie of the same name in 2017. Brizendine served as the inspiration for the film's main character.

== See also ==
- Biology of gender
- Brain Gender
- Brain Sex
