= List of Conan episodes (2014) =

Conan
- No. of episodes: 157

Release
- Original network: TBS
- Original release: January 6 – December 18, 2014

Season chronology
- ← Previous; 2013 episodes Next → 2015 episodes

This list of episodes of Conan details information on the 2014 episodes of Conan, a television program on TBS hosted by Conan O'Brien. Between March 31–April 3, Conan taped four shows at the Majestic Theatre in Dallas, Texas.

== 2014 ==
=== January ===
No.	Title	Original release date	Guest(s)	Musical/entertainment guest(s)	Ref.
511	"2014. The Year, or the Number of Talk Shows?"	January 6, 2014	Timothy Olyphant, David Koechner	Panic! at the Disco	
512	"Superman vs. Batman vs. The Local Cape-Launderers Union"	January 7, 2014	Kat Dennings and Beth Behrs, Harland Williams	Kid Ink	
513	"In France They Call the Show a 'Conan with Cheese.'"	January 8, 2014	David Mizejewski, Patton Oswalt	The Kin	
514	"Recipe for Disaster, No Wait, Onion Soup"	January 9, 2014	Mark Wahlberg, Kathryn Hahn	Chad Daniels	
515	"Noodlepony, and Other Terrible Band Names"	January 13, 2014	Courteney Cox, John Leguizamo	Jamestown Revival	
516	"Breakfast at Tiffany's, Lunch at T. J. Maxx"	January 14, 2014	Joel McHale, Lauren Ash	N/A	
517	"The iPhone App That Was So Much Fun, Everyone Starved to Death"	January 15, 2014	Damian Lewis, Jon Bernthal	Moon Taxi	
518	"Thursday the Rabbi Ate Bac-Os"	January 16, 2014	Joseph Gordon-Levitt, Emmy Rossum	Sharon Jones & The Dap-Kings	
519	"The Desolation of That One Lonely Nerd Who Constantly Corrects People on the Proper Pronunciation of 'Smaug'"	January 20, 2014	The Cast of Workaholics, Gabrielle Union	N/A	
520	"Did Someone Order an Entendre with Extra Penis?"	January 21, 2014	Kristen Bell, Alana Nichols	Sarah Jarosz	
521	"Apocalypse Now, or Later, Whenever's Good for You"	January 22, 2014	Matt LeBlanc, The Cast of Impractical Jokers	Trombone Shorty and Orleans Avenue	
522	"The Bun Crumbs on Cumberbatch's Cummerbund"	January 23, 2014	Ice Cube, Wayne Gretzky	Chris Fairbanks	
523	"'Yo Hombre, Can I Get Another Grey Goose and Red Bull?' Asked the Insufferable Douchebag"	January 27, 2014	Bill Hader, Breckin Meyer	The Strypes	
524	"That's a Moray: Italian Eels in Love"	January 28, 2014	Greg Kinnear, Anna Kendrick	Jimmy Vivino and the Black Italians	
525		January 29, 2014	Don Cheadle, Josh Hopkins	Hard Working Americans	
526		January 30, 2014	General Ray Odierno, Bill Burr	TBA	

=== February ===
No.	Original release date	Guest(s)	Musical/entertainment guest(s)	Ref.
527	February 3, 2014	Zac Efron and Miles Teller, Ellie Kemper	Neko Case with Calexico	
528	February 4, 2014	Ted Danson, Olga Kurylenko	J Roddy Walston and the Business	
529	February 5, 2014	Nick Offerman, Michelle Monaghan	Daniel Sloss	
530	February 6, 2014	The Cast of The Walking Dead	White Denim	
531	February 10, 2014	Martin Scorsese, Vanessa Bayer	Rock Candy Funk Party	
532	February 11, 2014	Aubrey Plaza, Joel Kinnaman	Toni Braxton and Kenny "Babyface" Edmonds	
533	February 12, 2014	Larry King, Cristin Milioti	Jhené Aiko	
534	February 13, 2014	Tom Arnold, Dr. Jennifer Berman	Ron Funches	
535	February 18, 2014	Mel Brooks	Langhorne Slim and the Law	
536	February 19, 2014	Ray Romano, Tom Felton	Fortune Feimster	
537	February 20, 2014	Chris O'Donnell, Sage Kotsenburg	Needtobreathe	
538	February 24, 2014	Jonah Hill, Lupita Nyong'o	John Butler Trio	
539	February 25, 2014	Michelle Dockery, DJ Qualls	Schoolboy Q	
540	February 26, 2014	Sarah Michelle Gellar, Nick Kroll	Ted Alexandro	
541	February 27, 2014	John C. Reilly, Pete Holmes	The Haden Triplets	

=== March ===
No.	Original release date	Guest(s)	Musical/entertainment guest(s)	Ref.
542	March 3, 2014	Malin Åkerman, Jim Jefferies	James Durbin	
543	March 4, 2014	Betty White, Jason Momoa	American Authors	
544	March 5, 2014	Jeff Goldblum, Angie Harmon	Isaac Witty	
545	March 6, 2014	Kristin Chenoweth, Billy Connolly	Drive-By Truckers	
546	March 10, 2014	Kevin Nealon, Ansel Elgort	Warpaint	
547	March 11, 2014	Ricky Gervais, Gillian Jacobs	Goo Goo Dolls	
548	March 12, 2014	Aaron Paul, Maggie Q	Ian Karmel	
549	March 24, 2014	Jeff Garlin, Andy Daly	Todd Barry	
550	March 25, 2014	Fred Armisen and Carrie Brownstein, Rachael Harris	Lucius	
551	March 26, 2014	Rosario Dawson, Hannibal Buress	Frankie Ballard	
552	March 31, 2014	Adam Sandler	Tig Notaro	

=== April ===
No.	Original release date	Guest(s)	Musical/entertainment guest(s)	Ref.
553	April 1, 2014	Seth Rogen	Phillip Phillips	
554	April 2, 2014	Simon Helberg	Eli Young Band	
555	April 3, 2014	Charles Barkley	Lyle Lovett	
556	April 7, 2014	Howie Mandel, Christina Hendricks	Rob Gleeson	
557	April 8, 2014	Anthony Mackie, Kumail Nanjiani	Bad Suns	
558	April 9, 2014	Andy García, Jenna Elfman	Ingrid Michaelson	
559	April 14, 2014	Mindy Kaling, Colin Hanks	MGMT	
560	April 15, 2014	Nathan Fillion, Tatiana Maslany	Dan Soder	
561	April 16, 2014	Marlon Wayans, Nick Thune	Bastille	
562	April 17, 2014	Tracy Morgan, Judy Greer	Broken Bells	
563	April 28, 2014	Chelsea Handler, Hugh Dancy	Cristela Alonzo	
564	April 29, 2014	Kunal Nayyar, Max Brooks	Hurray for the Riff Raff	
565	April 30, 2014	Seth Green, Dave Attell	O.A.R.	

=== May ===
No.	Original release date	Guest(s)	Musical/entertainment guest(s)	Ref.
566	May 1, 2014	Martin Short, Jessica Paré	Kelis	
567	May 5, 2014	Julie Bowen, Billy Eichner	Ziggy Marley	
568	May 6, 2014	Christopher Meloni, Dave Franco	Hamilton Leithauser	
569	May 7, 2014	Sharon Osbourne, Paul F. Tompkins	Emily Heller	
570	May 8, 2014	Sharon Stone, Marc Maron	Rodrigo y Gabriela	
571	May 12, 2014	Will Arnett, Melissa Rauch	Ryan Hamilton	
572	May 13, 2014	Lisa Kudrow, George R. R. Martin	Wild Cub	
573	May 19, 2014	Eric Stonestreet, Rick Reilly	The Ghost of a Saber Tooth Tiger	
574	May 20, 2014	Steven Ho, Molly Shannon	Mike Recine	
575	May 21, 2014	Norm Macdonald, Mackenzie Davis	Veruca Salt	
576	May 22, 2014	Elliot Page, Bob Saget	Jennifer Nettles	

=== June ===
No.	Original release date	Guest(s)	Musical/entertainment guest(s)	Ref.
577	June 2, 2014	Kellan Lutz, Kate McKinnon	Gary Vider	
578	June 3, 2014	Jane Fonda, Ramón Rodríguez	Twin Shadow	
579	June 4, 2014	Emily Blunt, Brent Morin	Bob Mould	
580	June 5, 2014	Jon Favreau, Rob Riggle	Echosmith	
581	June 9, 2014	Channing Tatum and Jonah Hill	Grouplove	
582	June 10, 2014	Cobie Smulders, Jenny Slate	Ian Edwards	
583	June 11, 2014	Jack White, Amber Stevens	Jack White	
584	June 12, 2014	Eric McCormack, Michael Lewis	Roy Wood, Jr.	
585	June 16, 2014	Ice Cube, Chris D'Elia	Hari Kondabolu	
586	June 17, 2014	David Mizejewski, Max Greenfield	Bernhoft	
587	June 18, 2014	Elijah Wood, Jason Mantzoukas	The Both	
588	June 19, 2014	Kevin Hart, Rhona Mitra	Atmosphere	
589	June 23, 2014	Ice-T, Whitney Cummings	Body Count	
590	June 24, 2014	Meredith Vieira, Dean Norris	Cherub	
591	June 25, 2014	Eric Bana, Andy Serkis	Conway	
592	June 26, 2014	Joel McHale, Freddie Wong and Matt Arnold	Daniel Sloss	

=== July ===
No.	Original release date	Guest(s)	Musical/entertainment guest(s)	Ref.
593	July 14, 2014	Jason Biggs, Omar Gonzalez, Ellie Kemper	N/A	
594	July 15, 2014	Michael Sheen, Joe Manganiello	Marsha Ambrosius	
595	July 16, 2014	Michael Strahan, Famke Janssen	Mark Normand	
596	July 17, 2014	Jason Segel and Cameron Diaz, Matt Walsh	"Weird Al" Yankovic	
597	July 21, 2014	Carl Reiner, Angela Kinsey	Reggie Watts	
598	July 22, 2014	Gary Oldman, Gabriel Iglesias	The Hold Steady	
599	July 23, 2014	Stephen Moyer, Roger Corman	Boy & Bear	
600	July 24, 2014	Dwayne Johnson, Taye Diggs	Tori Amos	

=== August ===
No.	Original release date	Guest(s)	Musical/entertainment guest(s)	Ref.
601	August 4, 2014	The Cast of Orange Is the New Black	Nikki Lane	
602	August 5, 2014	Ethan Hawke, Mary Lynn Rajskub	Jamie Scott	
603	August 6, 2014	Larry King, Lizzy Caplan	Sam Morril	
604	August 7, 2014	Megan Fox, Todd Glass	N/A	
605	August 11, 2014	Will Arnett, Anna Camp	Benjamin Booker	
606	August 12, 2014	Damon Wayans, Jr., Ali Larter	Lake Street Dive	
607	August 13, 2014	Martin Lawrence, Kumail Nanjiani and Jonah Ray	Ty Segall	
608	August 14, 2014	Aubrey Plaza, Kesha	Cameron Esposito	
609	August 18, 2014	Josh Groban, Nathan Fielder	Jenny Lewis	
610	August 19, 2014	Jessica Alba, Marcus Haney	Tove Lo	
611	August 20, 2014	Pierce Brosnan, Jaime King	Hampton Yount	
612	August 21, 2014	Conan Scrapisode	N/A	

=== September ===
No.	Original release date	Guest(s)	Musical/entertainment guest(s)	Ref.
613	September 2, 2014	Allison Janney, Brett Gelman	Brooks Wheelan	
614	September 3, 2014	Justin Theroux, Tony Hale	Shovels & Rope	
615	September 4, 2014	Chris Hardwick, Keizo Shimamoto	David Gray	
616	September 8, 2014	Mel Brooks, Adam DeVine	alt-J	
617	September 9, 2014	Anna Faris, John Hodgman	Wiz Khalifa	
618	September 10, 2014	Seth Green, Leslie Bibb	Sturgill Simpson	
619	September 11, 2014	Kunal Nayyar, Ben Schwartz	Garfunkel and Oates	
620	September 15, 2014	Timothy Olyphant, Nasim Pedrad	Passenger	
621	September 16, 2014	Kevin Nealon, Dr. Jennifer Berman	Nick Griffin	
622	September 17, 2014	Marisa Tomei, Jim Jefferies	Old Crow Medicine Show	
623	September 18, 2014	Hank Azaria, Hannibal Buress	Tegan and Sara	
624	September 22, 2014	Zooey Deschanel, Breckin Meyer	Beck	
625	September 23, 2014	Kirsten Dunst, Ike Barinholtz	Paul Simon	
626	September 24, 2014	Luke Wilson	Dhani Harrison and Friends	
627	September 25, 2014	Bill Hader, Chelsea Peretti	Norah Jones	
628	September 29, 2014	Sir Ben Kingsley, Al Madrigal	Kenny Chesney	
629	September 30, 2014	Jesse Tyler Ferguson, Bill Burr	Chrissie Hynde	

=== October ===
No.	Original release date	Guest(s)	Musical/entertainment guest(s)	Ref.
630	October 1, 2014	Nick Offerman, Jerrod Carmichael	Pete Correale	
631	October 2, 2014	Martin Short, Camilla Luddington	Ryan Adams	
632	October 13, 2014	Dax Shepard, Rosemarie DeWitt	Dan St. Germain	
633	October 14, 2014	Jennifer Garner, T. J. Miller	Shakey Graves	
634	October 15, 2014	Chelsea Handler, Nicholas Hoult	Gerard Way	
635	October 16, 2014	Anthony Anderson, Jon Lovitz	The New Pornographers	
636	October 20, 2014	Alan Cumming, Casey Wilson, Joe Perry	Pentatonix	
637	October 21, 2014	Dana Carvey, Cristin Milioti	Gary Gulman	
638	October 22, 2014	Kat Dennings, Wyatt Cenac	Tenacious D	
639	October 23, 2014	Neil Patrick Harris, Damian Lillard	Kiesza	
640	October 27, 2014	Blake Griffin, Max Greenfield	Bear Hands	
641	October 28, 2014	Ashton Kutcher, Krysten Ritter	Beck, Max Weinberg	
642	October 29, 2014	Jon Cryer, Katharine McPhee	Bob Odenkirk	
643	October 30, 2014	Jake Gyllenhaal, Judy Greer	The War on Drugs	

NOTES: The October 28 episode included a joke scene where regular The Basic Cable Band drummer James Wormworth had supposedly gone missing, so Max Weinberg volunteered to fill in. This marks Weinberg's first return to Conan since the end of The Tonight Show with Conan O'Brien.

=== November ===
No.	Original release date	Guest(s)	Musical/entertainment guest(s)	Ref.
644	November 3, 2014	David Mizejewski, Hannah Simone	Matt Donaher	
645	November 4, 2014	Dr. Phil, Joshua Jackson	Phox	
646	November 5, 2014	Howie Mandel, Deepak Chopra	Bleachers	
647	November 6, 2014	Daniel Radcliffe, Andrea Martin	The Flaming Lips featuring Miley Cyrus	
648	November 10, 2014	Edward Norton, Octavia Spencer	Olivia Jean	
649	November 11, 2014	The Cast of Sons of Anarchy	First Aid Kit	
650	November 12, 2014	Jessica Chastain, Adam Pally	Allen Strickland Williams	
651	November 13, 2014	Adam Levine, Chuck Todd	Sylvan Esso	
652	November 17, 2014	Key and Peele, Natalie Dormer	Real Estate	
653	November 18, 2014	Hilary Swank, Jimmy Pardo	Hoodie Allen	
654	November 19, 2014	Charlie Day, Julianne Hough	Forrest Shaw	
655	November 20, 2014	Jason Bateman, Andy Cohen	Cold War Kids	

=== December ===
No.	Original release date	Guest(s)	Musical/entertainment guest(s)	Ref.
656	December 1, 2014	Mindy Kaling, A. J. Jacobs	D.J. Demers	
657	December 2, 2014	Kellan Lutz, Marc Maron	Gavin DeGraw	
658	December 3, 2014	Joseph Gordon-Levitt, Billy Eichner	The Decemberists	
659	December 4, 2014	Jennifer Aniston, Bill Burr	N/A	
660	December 8, 2014	Evangeline Lilly, Pete Holmes	Jackson Browne	
661	December 9, 2014	Sofía Vergara, J. B. Smoove	tUnE-yArDs	
662	December 10, 2014	Rebecca Romijn, Robert Patrick	Mo Mandel	
663	December 11, 2014	Rosario Dawson, Joel Edgerton	Bahamas	
664	December 15, 2014	Lisa Kudrow, Eric André	Interpol	
665	December 16, 2014	Dick Van Dyke, Jenny Slate	Vance Joy	
666	December 17, 2014	Jason Schwartzman, Jack O'Connell	King Tuff	
667	December 18, 2014	Orlando Bloom, John C. McGinley	Sebastian Maniscalco	
