= List of Conan episodes (2016) =

Conan
- No. of episodes: 152

Release
- Original network: TBS
- Original release: January 4 – December 21, 2016

Season chronology
- ← Previous; 2015 episodes Next → 2017 episodes

This list of episodes of Conan details information on the 2016 episodes of Conan, a television program on TBS hosted by Conan O'Brien.

== 2016 ==
=== January ===
No.	Original release date	Guest(s)	Musical/entertainment guest(s)	Ref.
823	January 4, 2016	Martin Short, Lauren Ash	5 Seconds of Summer	
824	January 5, 2016	Quentin Tarantino, Yves Rossy & Vince Reffet	Lil Dicky featuring Rich Homie Quan	
825	January 6, 2016	Ray Liotta, Amy Landecker	Grizfolk	
826	January 7, 2016	Ricky Gervais, Marsai Martin	Rory Scovel	
827	January 11, 2016	Jack McBrayer, Neil deGrasse Tyson	Joe List, David Bowie (archive footage from April 10, 1997)	
828	January 12, 2016	Steve Carell, Mike Schultz	N/A	
829	January 13, 2016	Patton Oswalt, Zack Snyder	Highly Suspect	
830	January 14, 2016	Kevin Hart, Nick Robinson	N/A	
831	January 18, 2016	Megan Mullally, Gus Kenworthy	Brantley Gilbert	
832	January 19, 2016	Ed Helms, Noel Fielding	Purity Ring	
833	January 20, 2016	Mike Tyson, Joanne Froggatt	Oh Wonder	
834	January 21, 2016	Eva Longoria, Chef José Andrés	Marques Ray	
835	January 25, 2016	Mission Conan	N/A	
836	January 26, 2016	Zach Galifianakis, Jillian Bell	Josh Ritter	
837	January 27, 2016	Carol Burnett, Eric André	Brad Wenzel	
838	January 28, 2016	Jack Black, Robert Kazinsky	Ty Dolla $ign	

=== February ===
No.	Original release date	Guest(s)	Musical/entertainment guest(s)	Ref.
839	February 1, 2016	Drew Brees, George Miller	Fahim Anwar	
840	February 2, 2016	Charlie Day, Rob Gronkowski	Daniel Sloss	
841	February 3, 2016	Josh Brolin, Tom Segura	Cage the Elephant	
842	February 4, 2016	Jane Lynch, Alden Ehrenreich	Andrew Bird	
843	February 8, 2016	Ray Romano, PewDiePie	Dulcé Sloan	
844	February 9, 2016	Bob Costas, Teresa Palmer	Adam Cayton-Holland	
845	February 10, 2016	Chelsea Handler, Jason Mantzoukas	Lianne La Havas	
846	February 11, 2016	Carl Reiner, Jacob Tremblay	Emily King	
847	February 22, 2016	Rob Lowe, Gina Rodriguez	Leonard Ouzts	
848	February 23, 2016	Judd Apatow, Wyatt Cenac	Dion	
849	February 24, 2016	The Cast of The Big Bang Theory	N/A	
850	February 25, 2016	Kate Hudson, Robert Patrick	Lake Street Dive	
851	February 29, 2016	Angela Bassett, Jay Duplass	Peter Frampton	

=== March ===
No.	Original release date	Guest(s)	Musical/entertainment guest(s)	Ref.
852	March 1, 2016	Bob Odenkirk, Dr. Jennifer Berman	Carmen Lynch	
853	March 2, 2016	Sacha Baron Cohen, Jimmy Pardo	Parquet Courts	
854	March 3, 2016	Conor McGregor, Dave Attell	BJ the Chicago Kid	
855	March 7, 2016	Snoop Dogg, Steve Wozniak	The Record Company	
856	March 8, 2016	David Mizejewski, Behati Prinsloo	Shane Torres	
857	March 9, 2016	Jason Sudeikis, Walton Goggins	Lukas Nelson & Promise of the Real	
858	March 10, 2016	Jason Bateman, Wendy Williams	Kaleo	
859	March 21, 2016	Chris Hardwick, Jurnee Smollett-Bell	Emily Galati	
860	March 22, 2016	Amanda Peet, Lamorne Morris	Ty Segall and The Muggers	
861	March 23, 2016	Tony Hale, Melissa Rauch	Josh Gondelman	
862	March 24, 2016	Rashida Jones, Sheamus	Margo Price	
863	March 28, 2016	J. B. Smoove, Jake Tapper	Disturbed	
864	March 29, 2016	Danai Gurira, Niecy Nash	Chris Janson	
865	March 30, 2016	Jon Bernthal, Richard Linklater	Omarion	
866	March 31, 2016	The Cast & Director of Batman v Superman: Dawn of Justice	N/A	

=== April ===
No.	Original release date	Guest(s)	Musical/entertainment guest(s)	Ref.
867	April 4, 2016	Anthony Anderson, Lauren Lapkus	Nick Griffin	
868	April 5, 2016	Wanda Sykes, Sharon Horgan	Aurora	
869	April 6, 2016	Adam Scott, John Cena	Larkin Poe	
870	April 7, 2016	Paul Reubens, Liam Cunningham	Michael Kiwanuka	
871	April 9, 2016	Conan Korea, with Steven Yeun	N/A	
872	April 11, 2016	Kevin Nealon, Sophie Turner	Quincy Jones	
873	April 12, 2016	Aaron Paul, John Bradley-West	Ben Rector	
874	April 14, 2016	Emilia Clarke, Jason Jones	Eagles of Death Metal	
875	April 25, 2016	Fred Savage, Jen Kirkman	Steve Gillespie	
876	April 26, 2016	Ellie Kemper, Chris Gethard	Meg Myers	
877	April 27, 2016	Timothy Olyphant, Jerrod Carmichael	Sturgill Simpson	
878	April 28, 2016	Keegan-Michael Key & Jordan Peele, Zoey Deutch	N/A	

=== May ===
No.	Original release date	Guest(s)	Musical/entertainment guest(s)	Ref.
879	May 2, 2016	Dr. Phil, Amanda Crew	Pentatonix	
880	May 3, 2016	"Weird Al" Yankovic, Kate Micucci	Myq Kaplan	
881	May 4, 2016	Rob Riggle, Moshe Kasher	The Heavy	
882	May 5, 2016	Louis C.K., Mary Elizabeth Ellis	Ben Harper & The Innocent Criminals	
883	May 9, 2016	Zooey Deschanel, Team NWTN	Kevin Gates	
884	May 10, 2016	Mindy Kaling, Dr. Lucy Jones	Charles Bradley	
885	May 11, 2016	Jodie Foster, Gad Elmaleh	Mike Posner	
886	May 12, 2016	Ewan McGregor, Tracee Ellis Ross	Matt Donaher	
887	May 23, 2016	Bill Hader, Beanie Feldstein	Mark Normand	
888	May 24, 2016	Samantha Bee, Eugene & Dan Levy	Nothing But Thieves	
889	May 25, 2016	Colin Farrell, Caitriona Balfe	Declan McKenna	
890	May 26, 2016	Adam Sandler & David Spade, Natasha Leggero	N/A	

=== June ===
No.	Original release date	Guest(s)	Musical/entertainment guest(s)	Ref.
891	June 6, 2016	Will Arnett, Jeb Corliss	The Kills	
892	June 7, 2016	Dana Carvey, Deon Cole	Unknown Mortal Orchestra	
893	June 8, 2016	Megan Fox, Marc Maron	The Temper Trap	
894	June 9, 2016	John C. Reilly, Lucy Hale	Tom Papa	
895	June 13, 2016	Thomas Middleditch, Linda Cardellini	Daniel Sloss	
896	June 14, 2016	Kate Beckinsale, Brian Sacca	Marlon Williams & The Yarra Benders	
897	June 15, 2016	Fred Armisen, Nikki Glaser	Barns Courtney	
898	June 16, 2016	Roseanne Barr, Freddie Prinze Jr.	The Lumineers	
899	June 20, 2016	Kumail Nanjiani, Miesha Tate	Doug Smith	
900	June 21, 2016	Jeff Goldblum, Jonathan Tucker	Goo Goo Dolls	
901	June 22, 2016	Norman Reedus, Al Madrigal	Joel Kim Booster	
902	June 23, 2016	Liam Hemsworth, Lea DeLaria	Twin Peaks	
903	June 27, 2016	Aubrey Plaza, Frank Grillo	Pierce the Veil	
904	June 28, 2016	Alexander Skarsgård, Bo Burnham	School of Rock	
905	June 29, 2016	Jim Gaffigan, Julian McMahon	Wild Belle	
906	June 30, 2016	Zac Efron & Adam DeVine, Tavis Smiley	River Butcher	

=== July ===
No.	Original release date	Guest(s)	Musical/entertainment guest(s)	Ref.
907	July 5, 2016	Third Annual Conan Scrapisode	N/A	
908	July 6, 2016	Larry King, Brian Watson	Dustin Lynch	
909	July 7, 2016	Megan Mullally, Flula Borg	Aparna Nancherla	
910	July 11, 2016	Liev Schreiber, Ron Funches	M. Ward	
911	July 12, 2016	Dax Shepard, Amber Rose	Margaret Glaspy	
912	July 13, 2016	Curtis "50 Cent" Jackson, Annie Mumolo	Gary Gulman	
913	July 14, 2016	Melissa McCarthy, Sam Suchmann & Mattie Zufelt	Parker Millsap	
914	July 20, 2016	The Cast of Silicon Valley	N/A	
915	July 21, 2016	Nick Kroll; Stephen Amell, Grant Gustin, & Melissa Benoist	"Weird Al" Yankovic	
916	July 23, 2016	The Cast of Suicide Squad	N/A	
917	July 24, 2016	The Cast & Creators of Game of Thrones	N/A	
918	July 25, 2016	Chris Hardwick, Jim Jefferies	Matthew Broussard	
919	July 26, 2016	Allison Janney, Nate Diaz	Autolux	
920	July 27, 2016	Mila Kunis, Will Greenberg	Local Natives	
921	July 28, 2016	Christina Applegate, Adrienne C. Moore	Lukas Graham	

=== August ===
No.	Original release date	Guest(s)	Musical/entertainment guest(s)	Ref.
922	August 22, 2016	Senator Al Franken, Danielle Brooks	Noah Gardenswartz	
923	August 23, 2016	John Krasinski, Judy Greer	Blood Orange	
924	August 24, 2016	Cobie Smulders, Werner Herzog	Lindsey Stirling	
925	August 25, 2016	Jane Lynch, Jeffrey Toobin	Wolf Parade	
926	August 29, 2016	Walton Goggins, Tig Notaro	Corinne Bailey Rae	
927	August 30, 2016	Steven Ho, David Cross	Dan Naturman	
928	August 31, 2016	Jeff Bridges, Jeff Ross	Brent Sullivan	

=== September ===
No.	Original release date	Guest(s)	Musical/entertainment guest(s)	Ref.
929	September 1, 2016	Bob Odenkirk, Flula Borg	Joseph	
930	September 12, 2016	Timothy Olyphant, Nicole Byer	NEEDTOBREATHE	
931	September 13, 2016	Billy Gardell, Draymond Green	Finish Ticket	
932	September 14, 2016	Bob Costas, Pamela Adlon	Mary Mack	
933	September 15, 2016	Danny McBride, Regina Hall	Colvin & Earle	
934	September 19, 2016	Andy Samberg, Portia Doubleday	St. Paul and The Broken Bones	
935	September 20, 2016	Marshawn Lynch, Brian Posehn	Nick Cody	
936	September 21, 2016	Ice Cube, Eric André	Catfish and the Bottlemen	
937	September 22, 2016	Jeff Garlin, Ta'Rhonda Jones	Panic! at the Disco	
938	September 26, 2016	Patton Oswalt, Joe Walsh	Tall Heights	
939	September 27, 2016	Sharon Osbourne, Bruce Campbell	Mike Recine	
940	September 28, 2016	Kunal Nayyar, Phoebe Robinson	Jamestown Revival	
941	September 29, 2016	Ozzy & Jack Osbourne, Dylan Moran	N/A	

=== October ===
No.	Original release date	Guest(s)	Musical/entertainment guest(s)	Ref.
942	October 3, 2016	Kevin Nealon, Mike Colter	Amos Lee	
943	October 4, 2016	Kristen Bell, Evan Peters	Miike Snow	
944	October 5, 2016	Norm Macdonald, Keke Palmer	ZZ Top	
945	October 6, 2016	Christian Slater, Andy Daly	Kyle Kinane	
946	October 24, 2016	Bryce Dallas Howard, Deepak Chopra	Orlando Baxter	
947	October 25, 2016	Ron Howard, Wayne Gretzky	DRAM	
948	October 26, 2016	Elijah Wood, Joy Bryant	Tove Lo	
949	October 27, 2016	Steven Yeun, Chris Martin	Chris Martin	
950	October 31, 2016	T. J. Miller	The Sugarhill Gang	

=== November ===
No.	Original release date	Guest(s)	Musical/entertainment guest(s)	Ref.
951	November 1, 2016	Louis C.K.	N/A	
952	November 2, 2016	Ryan Reynolds	Rory Scovel	
953	November 3, 2016	Tracy Morgan	N/A	
954	November 9, 2016	Bill Burr, Ben Zobrist	FIDLAR	
955	November 10, 2016	John Cleese & Eric Idle, Issa Rae	Full Spectrum featuring Grace Potter	
956	November 14, 2016	Lin-Manuel Miranda, John Early	The Head and the Heart	
957	November 15, 2016	Matt LeBlanc, Anthony Bourdain	Dana Gould	
958	November 16, 2016	Ashton Kutcher, Reggie Watts	Moby	
959	November 17, 2016	Adam Sandler, David Spade, Nick Swardson, Norm Macdonald & Rob Schneider	clipping.	
960	November 28, 2016	Joel McHale, Kate Mara	Alice Wetterlund	
961	November 29, 2016	Senator Bernie Sanders, Pete Holmes	Shovels & Rope	
962	November 30, 2016	Nick Offerman, Johnny Pemberton	DOROTHY	

=== December ===
No.	Original release date	Guest(s)	Musical/entertainment guest(s)	Ref.
963	December 1, 2016	Simon Helberg, Jai Courtney	Sebastian Maniscalco	
964	December 5, 2016	Luke Wilson, Robert Kirkman	Sam Morril	
965	December 6, 2016	Molly Shannon, Joe Buck	Dinosaur Jr.	
966	December 7, 2016	Conan in Berlin, with Flula Borg	N/A	
967	December 7, 2016	Jake Gyllenhaal, Ronda Rousey	Robert Glasper Experiment	
968	December 8, 2016	T. J. Miller, Melissa Rauch	The Lemon Twigs	
969	December 13, 2016	Chris Pratt, Tom Papa	The Naked and Famous	
970	December 14, 2016	Keegan-Michael Key, The Cast of People of Earth	N/A	
971	December 15, 2016	Diego Luna, Billy Eichner	Pretenders	
972	December 19, 2016	Edward Norton, Alan Tudyk	The Revivalists	
973	December 20, 2016	Megan Mullally, Steve Ballmer	David Gborie	
974	December 21, 2016	Bryan Cranston & James Franco, Barry Crimmins	Billie Joe Armstrong	
