= List of Conan episodes (2018) =

Conan
- No. of episodes: 97

Release
- Original network: TBS
- Original release: January 15 – November 28, 2018

Season chronology
- ← Previous; 2017 episodes Next → 2019 episodes

This list of episodes of Conan details information on the 2018 episodes of Conan, a television program on TBS hosted by Conan O'Brien.

== 2018 ==
=== January ===
No.	Original release date	Guest(s)	Musical/entertainment guest(s)	Ref.
1114	January 15, 2018	Allison Janney, Pete Holmes	Daniel Sloss	
1115	January 16, 2018	Curtis "50 Cent" Jackson, Rebecca Romijn	Dashboard Confessional	
1116	January 17, 2018	Molly Shannon, Aaron Sorkin	Mo Welch	
1117	January 18, 2018	Anderson Cooper, Selma Blair	Grizzly Bear	
1118	January 22, 2018	Sharon Stone, Luke Evans	Ismo	
1119	January 23, 2018	Kathy Bates, Louie Anderson	Tune-Yards	
1120	January 24, 2018	DJ Khaled, Natasha Leggero	The Ghost of Paul Revere	
1121	January 25, 2018	Lisa Kudrow, Tom Segura	Sam Morril	
1122	January 27, 2018	Conan Without Borders: Haiti	N/A	
1123	January 29, 2018	Aaron Paul, D'Arcy Carden	Kellen Erskine	
1124	January 30, 2018	Kevin Nealon, Martin Freeman	Jordan Temple	
1125	January 31, 2018	Wanda Sykes, Tom Papa	Mt. Joy	

=== February ===
No.	Original release date	Guest(s)	Musical/entertainment guest(s)	Ref.
1126	February 1, 2018	Dr. Phil, Fred Fugen & Vince Reffet	Albert Hammond Jr.	
1127	February 5, 2018	Bill Burr, Chelsea Peretti	Seann Walsh	
1128	February 6, 2018	Laurence Fishburne, Nicole Byer	Liza Anne	
1129	February 7, 2018	Kumail Nanjiani & Emily V. Gordon, Van Jones	Judah & the Lion	
1130	February 8, 2018	Jamie Dornan, Jenna Fischer	Jena Friedman	
1131	February 26, 2018	Nick Kroll & John Mulaney, Olan Rogers	Debra DiGiovanni	
1132	February 27, 2018	Joel McHale, Anna Paquin	Alex Edelman	
1133	February 28, 2018	Zach Galifianakis, Jamie Anderson	They Might Be Giants	

=== March ===
No.	Original release date	Guest(s)	Musical/entertainment guest(s)	Ref.
1134	March 1, 2018	Heather Graham, Gad Elmaleh	Sofi Tukker	
1135	March 5, 2018	Kevin Hart, Nash Edgerton	N/A	
1136	March 6, 2018	Martin Short, Natalie Zea	Michael Longfellow	
1137	March 7, 2018	David Oyelowo, Jimmy Pardo	Margo Price	
1138	March 8, 2018	J. B. Smoove, Walton Goggins	Morgan Saint	
1139	March 12, 2018	Minnie Driver, Ron Funches	Mary Mack	
1140	March 13, 2018	Terry Crews, Robert Reich	Mark Normand	
1141	March 14, 2018	Jeff Goldblum, Sebastian Maniscalco	Nothing But Thieves	
1142	March 19, 2018	Burt Reynolds, Dylan Moran	Rachel Feinstein	
1143	March 20, 2018	Bill Hader, Alexandra Shipp	Natalie Prass	
1144	March 21, 2018	Judd Apatow, Krysten Ritter	ROZES with Nicky Romero	
1145	March 26, 2018	Thomas Middleditch, Ta'Rhonda Jones	Erin Jackson	
1146	March 27, 2018	Armie Hammer, Nick Swardson	N/A	
1147	March 28, 2018	Ed Helms, Miles Brown	The Breeders	
1148	March 29, 2018	Sean Penn, Claudia O'Doherty	N/A	

=== April ===
No.	Original release date	Guest(s)	Musical/entertainment guest(s)	Ref.
1149	April 9, 2018	Dax Shepard, Grant Gustin	Nick Griffin	
1150	April 10, 2018	Hilary Swank, Zach Woods	The Lone Bellow	
1151	April 11, 2018	Conan Without Borders: Italy	N/A	
1152	April 11, 2018	Jeff Garlin, Hayley Atwell	Declan McKenna	
1153	April 12, 2018	Andy Cohen, Ike Barinholtz	JC Currais	
1154	April 16, 2018	Timothy Olyphant, January Jones	N/A	
1155	April 17, 2018	Jeff Daniels, Lauren Ash	N/A	
1156	April 18, 2018	Joe Manganiello, Natasha Leggero	Benjamin Gibbard	
1157	April 19, 2018	Jason Sudeikis, Malin Åkerman	Monrok	
1158	April 23, 2018	Dana Carvey, Nicolle Wallace	N/A	
1159	April 24, 2018	Zach Braff, Alia Shawkat	Andrew W.K.	
1160	April 25, 2018	Chris Gethard	Joe Machi, Odesza	
1161	April 26, 2018	The Cast of Avengers: Infinity War	N/A	
1162	April 30, 2018	Tracy Morgan, Kristen Schaal	Ocean Park Standoff	

=== May ===
No.	Original release date	Guest(s)	Musical/entertainment guest(s)	Ref.
1163	May 1, 2018	Kunal Nayyar, Adam Pally	Harrison Greenbaum	
1164	May 2, 2018	Aubrey Plaza, Jason George	Marlon Williams	
1165	May 3, 2018	Jenna Elfman, Rory Scovel	Robby Slowik	
1166	May 7, 2018	Jim Jefferies, Natasha Lyonne	Wajatta	
1167	May 8, 2018	Eva Longoria, Luke Hemsworth	Ben Harper & Charlie Musselwhite	
1168	May 9, 2018	Tony Hale, Brian Posehn	James Veitch	
1169	May 10, 2018	Tracee Ellis Ross, Rob Riggle	Bush	
1170	May 21, 2018	Carol Burnett, Kiersey Clemons	N/A	
1171	May 22, 2018	Cedric the Entertainer, Julian Dennison	Tuxedo & Zapp	
1172	May 23, 2018	Kelsey Grammer, Anthony Joshua	Lake Street Dive	
1173	May 24, 2018	James Comey, Tig Notaro	Cory Kahaney	

=== June ===
No.	Original release date	Guest(s)	Musical/entertainment guest(s)	Ref.
1174	June 4, 2018	Ashton Kutcher, Christian Navarro	Johnny Marr	
1175	June 5, 2018	Chris Hardwick, Leslie Bibb	Nore Davis	
1176	June 6, 2018	Jodie Foster, Flula Borg	Neko Case	
1177	June 7, 2018	Kate Mara, Sam Richardson	Hari Kondabolu	
1178	June 11, 2018	Amanda Peet, Daniel Cormier	Steve Cropper & Benjamin Booker	
1179	June 12, 2018	Kevin Nealon, Yvonne Strahovski	Allen Strickland Williams	
1180	June 13, 2018	Nick Offerman, Moshe Kasher	Rell Battle	
1181	June 14, 2018	Lisa Kudrow, Tom Papa	Jukebox the Ghost	

=== July ===
No.	Original release date	Guest(s)	Musical/entertainment guest(s)	Ref.
1182	July 9, 2018	Steven Yeun, Van Jones	Nick Hart	
1183	July 10, 2018	DJ Khaled, Chris Redd	Twin Shadow	
1184	July 11, 2018	Howie Mandel, Lil Rel Howery	Chris Cope	
1185	July 12, 2018	Andy Samberg, Nicole Byer	Dawes	
1186	July 18, 2018	The Cast & Creator of Breaking Bad	N/A	
1187	July 19, 2018	The Cast & Director of The Predator	N/A	
1188	July 21, 2018	The Cast & Director of Glass	N/A	
1189	July 22, 2018	The Cast & Director of Aquaman	N/A	

=== August ===
No.	Original release date	Guest(s)	Musical/entertainment guest(s)	Ref.
1190	August 20, 2018	Curtis "50 Cent" Jackson, Jimmy O. Yang	Emmy Blotnick	
1191	August 21, 2018	Bob Odenkirk, Zach Cregger	Shooter Jennings	
1192	August 22, 2018	Bill Burr, Regina Hall	Marina Franklin	
1193	August 23, 2018	Joel McHale, Giancarlo Esposito	White Denim	
1194	August 27, 2018	Marc Maron, Bert Kreischer	Dean Delray	
1195	August 28, 2018	Kristin Chenoweth, Tom Segura	The Marcus King Band	
1196	August 29, 2018	Bob Newhart, Nikki Glaser	Brad Wenzel	
1197	August 30, 2018	Patton Oswalt, Guy Branum	Punch Brothers	

=== September ===
No.	Original release date	Guest(s)	Musical/entertainment guest(s)	Ref.
1198	September 17, 2018	Ethan Hawke, Daniel Sloss	Ninja Sex Party	
1199	September 18, 2018	Javier Bardem, Elizabeth Olsen	Phoebe Bridgers	
1200	September 19, 2018	Fred Armisen, Alice Eve	Jonathan Wilson	
1201	September 20, 2018	Jeff Garlin, Boyd Holbrook	The Cooties	
1202	September 24, 2018	Bradley Cooper	Superorganism	
1203	September 25, 2018	Tim Allen, Judy Greer	Nick Nemeroff	
1204	September 26, 2018	Jeffrey Dean Morgan, Jamie Neumann	Chad Daniels	
1205	September 27, 2018	Jim Gaffigan, Seann William Scott	Gavin Turek	

=== October ===
No.	Original release date	Guest(s)	Musical/entertainment guest(s)	Ref.
1206	October 1, 2018	Anna Faris, Kyle Kinane	Nick Lowe & Los Straitjackets	
1207	October 2, 2018	Pete Holmes, Kate Micucci	Ted Alexandro	
1208	October 3, 2018	Conor McGregor, Brian Posehn	The Kills	
1209	October 4, 2018	Deon Cole	Jimmy Vivino and the Basic Cable Band (Final appearance on Conan)	

=== November ===
No.	Original release date	Guest(s)	Musical/entertainment guest(s)	Ref.
1210	November 28, 2018	Conan Without Borders: Japan	N/A	
