= List of Conan episodes (2017) =

Conan
- No. of episodes: 139

Release
- Original network: TBS
- Original release: January 9 – December 14, 2017

Season chronology
- ← Previous; 2016 episodes Next → 2018 episodes

This list of episodes of Conan details information on the 2017 episodes of Conan, a television program on TBS hosted by Conan O'Brien.

== 2017 ==
=== January ===
No.	Original release date	Guest(s)	Musical/entertainment guest(s)	Ref.
975	January 9, 2017	Viggo Mortensen, Brian Posehn	Emily Heller	
976	January 10, 2017	Anna Faris, Jamie Lee	Lewis Del Mar	
977	January 11, 2017	Jeff Goldblum, Coyote Peterson	Jimmy Eat World	
978	January 12, 2017	Mark Wahlberg, Elle Fanning	Judah & the Lion	
979	January 16, 2017	Fred Armisen, Van Jones	Drive-By Truckers	
980	January 17, 2017	Kathy Griffin, Michael Lewis	Johnnyswim	
981	January 18, 2017	Ted Danson, Gad Elmaleh	Josh Abbott Band	
982	January 19, 2017	Andrew Dice Clay, Jen Kirkman	Billy Wayne Davis	
983	January 23, 2017	Howie Mandel, Britt Lower, Triumph the Insult Comic Dog	Daniel Sloss	
984	January 24, 2017	Aaron Paul, Bert Kreischer	Colony House	
985	January 25, 2017	Leah Remini, Jeff Ross	Foxygen	
986	January 26, 2017	Chris Hardwick, Ron Funches	Cody Jinks	
987	January 30, 2017	Bill Burr, Lea DeLaria	Melissa Etheridge	
988	January 31, 2017	Timothy Olyphant, Russell Wilson	Nathan Macintosh	

=== February ===
No.	Original release date	Guest(s)	Musical/entertainment guest(s)	Ref.
989	February 1, 2017	Jamie Dornan, Blake Anderson	Orny Adams	
990	February 2, 2017	Ken Jeong, Colin Hanks	K. Flay	
991	February 6, 2017	Janelle Monáe, Sam Richardson	Bishop Briggs	
992	February 7, 2017	J. B. Smoove, Sean Giambrone, Studio C	N/A	
993	February 8, 2017	Anthony Anderson, Michelle Monaghan	Cristela Alonzo	
994	February 9, 2017	James White, Lester Holt, Kat Dennings	Aaron Lee Tasjan	
995	February 13, 2017	David Oyelowo, Louie Anderson	Angel Olsen	
996	February 14, 2017	Nick Kroll & John Mulaney, Jake Tapper	Middle Kids	
997	February 15, 2017	The Cast of Fist Fight	Katherine Ryan	
998	February 27, 2017	Adam Scott, Génesis Rodríguez	The Vamps	
999	February 28, 2017	Martin Short, Natalie Zea	The Pretty Reckless	

=== March ===
No.	Original release date	Guest(s)	Musical/entertainment guest(s)	Ref.
1000	March 1, 2017	Conan Without Borders: Made in Mexico, with Diego Luna, Vicente Fox	Sofia Niño de Rivera	
1001	March 1, 2017	Mandy Moore, Jimmy Pardo	Chris Lane	
1002	March 2, 2017	Lisa Kudrow, Justin Bartha	The Strumbellas	
1003	March 6, 2017	Jesse Tyler Ferguson, Nasim Pedrad	Sinkane	
1004	March 7, 2017	Malin Åkerman, Pete Holmes	Hippo Campus	
1005	March 8, 2017	Sir Patrick Stewart, Jerrod Carmichael	Kurt Braunohler	
1006	March 9, 2017	Zachary Levi, John Lydon	Milky Chance	
1007	March 13, 2017	Carl Reiner, Lauren Lapkus	Hurray for the Riff Raff	
1008	March 14, 2017	Aubrey Plaza, Darren Criss	Old 97's	
1009	March 15, 2017	Adam Sandler, Dana White	N/A	
1010	March 20, 2017	Jeff Garlin, Adam Pally	N/A	
1011	March 21, 2017	Reese Witherspoon, Nick Swardson	N/A	
1012	March 22, 2017	Erin Andrews, Big Show	N/A	
1013	March 27, 2017	Dax Shepard & Michael Peña, Kaitlin Olson	Gary Clark Jr.	
1014	March 28, 2017	Joe Manganiello, Judy Greer	Joe Pera	
1015	March 29, 2017	Terry Crews, Andy Daly	Strand of Oaks	
1016	March 30, 2017	Wanda Sykes, Mr. T	Dead Man Winter	

=== April ===
No.	Original release date	Guest(s)	Musical/entertainment guest(s)	Ref.
1017	April 10, 2017	Jenna Elfman, David Koechner	Ian Abramson	
1018	April 11, 2017	Chelsea Handler, Scott Eastwood	The Regrettes	
1019	April 12, 2017	Chris "Ludacris" Bridges, Ariel Winter	Future Islands	
1020	April 13, 2017	Kunal Nayyar, Harland Williams	Lillie Mae	
1021	April 17, 2017	Jack McBrayer, Chris Gethard	King Gizzard & the Lizard Wizard	
1022	April 18, 2017	Christina Applegate, Sherri Shepherd	Car Seat Headrest	
1023	April 19, 2017	Chris O'Donnell, Deon Cole	X Ambassadors	
1024	April 20, 2017	Dana Carvey, Claudia O'Doherty	Brad Wenzel	
1025	April 24, 2017	Kumail Nanjiani, Representative Adam Schiff	Real Estate	
1026	April 25, 2017	Hank Azaria, Moshe Kasher	Vir Das	
1027	April 26, 2017	Dennis Quaid, Morena Baccarin	Nikki Lane	
1028	April 27, 2017	Patton Oswalt, Freddie Highmore	Pixies	

=== May ===
No.	Original release date	Guest(s)	Musical/entertainment guest(s)	Ref.
1029	May 1, 2017	Kevin Nealon, Chuck Todd	The Zombies	
1030	May 2, 2017	Kristin Chenoweth, Jonathan Banks	Highasakite	
1031	May 3, 2017	Kurt Russell, Ron Funches	Chicano Batman	
1032	May 4, 2017	Alec Baldwin, Al Madrigal	Joe List	
1033	May 8, 2017	Amanda Peet, Todd Barry	Incubus	
1034	May 9, 2017	Thomas Middleditch, Eric Christian Olsen	LP	
1035	May 10, 2017	Rashida Jones, Neil deGrasse Tyson	Sam Cohen & Danger Mouse	
1036	May 11, 2017	Charlie Hunnam, Kristen Schaal, Narek Margaryan & Sergey Sargsyan	N/A	
1037	May 22, 2017	Justin Theroux, Don Lemon	Seaton Smith	
1038	May 23, 2017	Nick Kroll, Ben Falcone	Dawes	
1039	May 24, 2017	T. J. Miller, Lennon Parham	Missio	
1040	May 25, 2017	The Cast of Veep	N/A	

=== June ===
No.	Original release date	Guest(s)	Musical/entertainment guest(s)	Ref.
1041	June 5, 2017	Sarah Silverman, Shawn Hatosy	alt-J	
1042	June 6, 2017	Ty Burrell, Zach Woods	Brent Cobb	
1043	June 7, 2017	Nick Offerman, Annabelle Wallis	Mark Normand	
1044	June 8, 2017	Patty Jenkins, Riley Keough	Laurie Kilmartin	
1045	June 12, 2017	Will Arnett, Rory Scovel	Luis Fonsi	
1046	June 13, 2017	Holly Hunter, Natasha Lyonne	Robert Cray & Hi Rhythm	
1047	June 14, 2017	Judd Apatow, Tom Papa	Tom Papa	
1048	June 15, 2017	Armie Hammer, Jim Jefferies	Gavin DeGraw	
1049	June 19, 2017	Aubrey Plaza, Demetrius Shipp Jr.	Joe Bonamassa	
1050	June 20, 2017	Elle Fanning, Ally Maki	James Acaster	
1051	June 21, 2017	Leslie Jones, Jeffrey Toobin	Mac DeMarco	
1052	June 22, 2017	Will Ferrell	Ha Ha Tonka	

=== July ===
No.	Original release date	Guest(s)	Musical/entertainment guest(s)	Ref.
1053	July 10, 2017	Snoop Dogg, Flula Borg	Mastodon	
1054	July 11, 2017	Aidy Bryant, Dr. Jennifer Berman	Earth, Wind & Fire	
1055	July 12, 2017	Marisa Tomei, Gabrielle Union	Jackie Kashian	
1056	July 13, 2017	Steven Ho, Marc Maron	D.J. Demers	
1057	July 19, 2017	The Cast of Bright, The Stars of Supernatural	N/A	
1058	July 20, 2017	The Cast of Kingsman: The Golden Circle	N/A	
1059	July 22, 2017	The Cast of The Lego Ninjago Movie	N/A	
1060	July 23, 2017	The Cast of Game of Thrones	N/A	

=== August ===
No.	Original release date	Guest(s)	Musical/entertainment guest(s)	Ref.
1061	August 7, 2017	Bob Newhart, Tom Segura	Sheryl Crow	
1062	August 8, 2017	Jennifer Jason Leigh, Andrea Savage	Benjamin Booker	
1063	August 9, 2017	Wesley Snipes, Louie Anderson	Drew Lynch	
1064	August 10, 2017	Bryan Cranston, Sebastian Maniscalco	Aimee Mann	
1065	August 14, 2017	Senator Al Franken, Kate Micucci	Portugal. The Man	
1066	August 15, 2017	Tracee Ellis Ross, Chris Gethard	Rojo Perez	
1067	August 16, 2017	Conor McGregor, James Van Der Beek	Dan St. Germain	
1068	August 17, 2017	Carl Reiner, Nikki Glaser	Pokey Lafarge	
1069	August 21, 2017	Matt LeBlanc, Brittany Snow	Myq Kaplan	
1070	August 22, 2017	Ice Cube, Lea DeLaria	Jim Lauderdale	
1071	August 23, 2017	Kathy Bates, Seann William Scott	Jeff Caldwell	
1072	August 24, 2017	Jane Lynch, Timothy Simons	Rancid	

=== September ===
No.	Original release date	Guest(s)	Musical/entertainment guest(s)	Ref.
1073	September 11, 2017	Heather Graham, Adam Conover	Jenny Zigrino	
1074	September 12, 2017	Chris Hardwick, Bill Skarsgård	Parcels	
1075	September 13, 2017	Jackie Chan, Tig Notaro	Gov't Mule	
1076	September 14, 2017	Jim Jefferies, Katy Tur	Taylor Tomlinson	
1077	September 18, 2017	Fred Savage, Paula Patton	Shane Torres	
1078	September 19, 2017	Conan Without Borders: Israel	N/A	
1079	September 19, 2017	Frankie Muniz	Josh Johnson	
1080	September 20, 2017	Luke Wilson, Jeff Bauman	Atlas Genius	
1081	September 21, 2017	Jake Gyllenhaal, Max Brooks	Rostam	
1082	September 25, 2017	Diego Luna, Aisha Tyler	Moses Storm	
1083	September 26, 2017	Elliot Page, The Cast of Impractical Jokers	Caleb Synan	
1084	September 27, 2017	Andy Samberg, Big Jay Oakerson	J Roddy Walston and the Business	
1085	September 28, 2017	Kyle MacLachlan, Rob Schneider	Lisa Loeb	

=== October ===
No.	Original release date	Guest(s)	Musical/entertainment guest(s)	Ref.
1086	October 2, 2017	Adam Scott, Marsai Martin	Grouplove	
1087	October 3, 2017	Minnie Driver, Matt Bomer	James Veitch	
1088	October 4, 2017	Billy Eichner, Michael Bisping	Lukas Nelson & Promise of the Real	
1089	October 5, 2017	Jared Leto, Dr. Dale Stuckenbruck	Kane Brown	
1090	October 23, 2017	"Weird Al" Yankovic, Taran Killam	Solomon Georgio	
1091	October 24, 2017	Adam Sandler, Evan Peters	Jimmy Dunn	
1092	October 25, 2017	Paul Reiser, Abbi Jacobson	JD McPherson	
1093	October 26, 2017	Elijah Wood, JoAnna Garcia Swisher	Paul Weller	
1094	October 30, 2017	Anna Faris, Nathan Fielder	Dhani Harrison	
1095	October 31, 2017	J. B. Smoove, Whitney Cummings	Joel Kim Booster	

=== November ===
No.	Original release date	Guest(s)	Musical/entertainment guest(s)	Ref.
1096	November 1, 2017	Kristen Bell, Frank Grillo	Beth Stelling	
1097	November 2, 2017	Mila Kunis, Maria Bamford	King Krule	
1098	November 6, 2017	Stephen Colbert	Rod Man	
1099	November 7, 2017	Keegan-Michael Key	N/A	
1100	November 8, 2017	President Bill Clinton	Jack Whitehall	
1101	November 9, 2017	The Cast of Daddy's Home 2	Jon Dore	
1102	November 27, 2017	Rainn Wilson, Angela Kinsey	Ivan Decker	
1103	November 28, 2017	Justin Verlander, Jay Pharoah	Langhorne Slim	
1104	November 29, 2017	Eric McCormack, Rob Riggle	Tom Thakkar	
1105	November 30, 2017	Josh Hutcherson, Daveed Diggs	Talib Kweli featuring Anderson .Paak	

=== December ===
No.	Original release date	Guest(s)	Musical/entertainment guest(s)	Ref.
1106	December 4, 2017	Dan Rather, Ana Gasteyer	Ty Segall	
1107	December 5, 2017	Jean-Claude Van Damme, Barkhad Abdi	Dina Hashem	
1108	December 6, 2017	Denis Leary, Frankie Shaw	Khalid Rahmaan	
1109	December 7, 2017	Patton Oswalt, Andy Serkis	Royal Blood	
1110	December 11, 2017	Ed Helms, Fareed Zakaria	Electric Guest	
1111	December 12, 2017	James Franco & Ari Graynor, Noomi Rapace	Gary Clark Jr.	
1112	December 13, 2017	Owen Wilson, Flula Borg	Noah Gardenswartz	
1113	December 14, 2017	Jack Black, Kate Hudson	N/A	
