= List of Conan episodes (2015) =

Conan
- No. of episodes: 155

Release
- Original network: TBS
- Original release: January 5 – December 17, 2015

Season chronology
- ← Previous; 2014 episodes Next → 2016 episodes

This list of episodes of Conan details information on the 2015 episodes of Conan, a television program on TBS hosted by Conan O'Brien.

== 2015 ==
=== January ===
| No. | Original release date | Guest(s) | Musical/entertainment guest(s) | Ref. |
|---|---|---|---|---|
| 668 | January 5, 2015 | Courteney Cox, Donald Faison | Michael Palascak | |
| 669 | January 6, 2015 | Anna Faris & Allison Janney, Joe Lo Truglio | BØRNS | |
| 670 | January 7, 2015 | Elizabeth Banks, Vinnie Jones | Sir Sly | |
| 671 | January 8, 2015 | Nicole Kidman, Maggie Grace | Aloe Blacc | |
| 672 | January 12, 2015 | Fred Armisen & Carrie Brownstein, Blake Anderson | Wade Bowen | |
| 673 | January 13, 2015 | Matt LeBlanc, Felicity Jones | Mariachi El Bronx | |
| 674 | January 14, 2015 | Sir Patrick Stewart, Niecy Nash | Simon Amstell | |
| 675 | January 15, 2015 | Patton Oswalt, Sally Hawkins | Run the Jewels | |
| 676 | January 19, 2015 | Rob Lowe, Jay Baruchel | Alingon Mitra | |
| 677 | January 20, 2015 | Olivia Munn, Dean Norris | Sleater-Kinney | |
| 678 | January 21, 2015 | Evan Rachel Wood, Jason Ritter | Belle and Sebastian | |
| 679 | January 22, 2015 | Ron Howard, Regina Hall | Rae Sremmurd | |
| 680 | January 26, 2015 | Amanda Peet, Ellar Coltrane | Jukebox the Ghost | |
| 681 | January 27, 2015 | Rainn Wilson, Lucy Hale | Brian Scolaro | |
| 682 | January 28, 2015 | Katherine Heigl, Drew Brees | Milo Greene | |
| 683 | January 29, 2015 | Simon Helberg, Tanishq Abraham | George Ezra | |

=== February ===
| No. | Original release date | Guest(s) | Musical/entertainment guest(s) | Ref. |
|---|---|---|---|---|
| 684 | February 2, 2015 | Eddie Redmayne, Bob Costas | Seinabo Sey | |
| 685 | February 3, 2015 | Steven Yeun, Jay & Mark Duplass | Ari Shaffir | |
| 686 | February 4, 2015 | Mila Kunis, Josh Hopkins | Cage the Elephant | |
| 687 | February 5, 2015 | Jeff Bridges, Lily Collins | Slash featuring Myles Kennedy and The Conspirators | |
| 688 | February 9, 2015 | Timothy Olyphant, Rebecca Frankel | Punch Brothers | |
| 689 | February 10, 2015 | Terry Crews, Professor Brian Cox | Solomon Georgio | |
| 690 | February 11, 2015 | Anna Kendrick, Gabrielle Union | Lee Ann Womack | |
| 691 | February 17, 2015 | Jack McBrayer & Triumph the Insult Comic Dog, Lauren Cohan | Jackie Kashian | |
| 692 | February 18, 2015 | Jon Cryer & Ashton Kutcher, Sage Kotsenburg | Kristian Bush | |
| 693 | February 19, 2015 | The Cast of Hot Tub Time Machine 2, Ronda Rousey | Hanni El Khatib | |
| 694 | February 23, 2015 | The Cast of It's Always Sunny in Philadelphia | In The Valley Below | |
| 695 | February 24, 2015 | Artie Lange, Victoria Justice | Daniel Sloss | |
| 696 | February 25, 2015 | Edward Norton, Melissa Rauch | Andrew Santino | |

=== March ===
| No. | Original release date | Guest(s) | Musical/entertainment guest(s) | Ref. |
|---|---|---|---|---|
| 697 | March 2, 2015 | Aziz Ansari, Cristela Alonzo | N/A | |
| 698 | March 3, 2015 | Norman Reedus, H. Jon Benjamin | Brandi Carlile | |
| 699 | March 4, 2015 | Conan in Cuba | N/A | |
| 700 | March 5, 2015 | Adam Sandler, Jonathan Banks | Broods | |
| 701 | March 16, 2015 | Kevin Nealon, Maia Mitchell | Tobias Jesso Jr. | |
| 702 | March 17, 2015 | Zachary Quinto, Kristen Schaal | OK Go | |
| 703 | March 18, 2015 | Sean Penn, Sasha Alexander | Dana Gould | |
| 704 | March 19, 2015 | Mindy Kaling, Brent Morin | Purity Ring | |
| 705 | March 23, 2015 | Naomi Watts, Nick Kroll | Tweedy | |
| 706 | March 24, 2015 | Kevin Hart, Roman Reigns | Hippo Campus | |
| 707 | March 25, 2015 | James Corden, Christopher Plummer | The Mavericks | |
| 708 | March 26, 2015 | Will Ferrell, Ellie Kemper | Andy Woodhull | |
| 709 | March 30, 2015 | Will Forte, Justin Willman | Mac DeMarco | |
| 710 | March 31, 2015 | Keith Urban, Chris "Ludacris" Bridges | Mark Little | |

=== April ===
| No. | Original release date | Guest(s) | Musical/entertainment guest(s) | Ref. |
|---|---|---|---|---|
| 711 | April 1, 2015 | Ringo Starr, Rob Corddry | Waters | |
| 712 | April 2, 2015 | Aubrey Plaza, Ron Funches | Calexico | |
| 713 | April 6, 2015 | Billy Gardell, Erin & Sara Foster | Tinashe | |
| 714 | April 7, 2015 | Ricky Gervais, Senator Elizabeth Warren | Awolnation | |
| 715 | April 8, 2015 | Kristen Stewart, Tig Notaro & Jon Dore | Brian Wilson | |
| 716 | April 9, 2015 | Amy Schumer, Kenny Smith | Joe Zimmerman | |
| 717 | April 13, 2015 | David Mizejewski, Chris D'Elia | Sturgill Simpson | |
| 718 | April 14, 2015 | Timothy Olyphant, Angela Kinsey | David O'Doherty | |
| 719 | April 15, 2015 | Ice Cube, Christina Tosi | Tame Impala | |
| 720 | April 16, 2015 | Rosario Dawson, Barney Frank | Royal Blood | |
| 721 | April 27, 2015 | Cedric the Entertainer, Fareed Zakaria | Marina and the Diamonds | |
| 722 | April 28, 2015 | Nikolaj Coster-Waldau, Zach Woods | The Lone Bellow | |
| 723 | April 29, 2015 | Matthew Perry, Rose McIver | Shawn Mendes | |
| 724 | April 30, 2015 | January Jones, Dave Attell | Mike Vecchione | |

=== May ===
| No. | Original release date | Guest(s) | Musical/entertainment guest(s) | Ref. |
|---|---|---|---|---|
| 725 | May 4, 2015 | Jeremy Renner, T. J. Miller | Mikal Cronin | |
| 726 | May 5, 2015 | Chris O'Dowd, Alicia Vikander | Best Coast | |
| 727 | May 6, 2015 | Helen Hunt, Nick Swardson | They Might Be Giants | |
| 728 | May 7, 2015 | Chris Hardwick, Matthew Weiner | Andy Sandford | |
| 729 | May 11, 2015 | Jean-Claude Van Damme, Nina Dobrev | The Word | |
| 730 | May 12, 2015 | Reese Witherspoon, Adam DeVine | Jerry Rocha | |
| 731 | May 18, 2015 | Betty White, Dr. Clio Cresswell | Lord Huron | |
| 732 | May 19, 2015 | Steven Ho, Brittany Snow | Incubus | |
| 733 | May 20, 2015 | Patton Oswalt, Bill Kreutzmann | The Tallest Man on Earth | |
| 734 | May 21, 2015 | Cobie Smulders, Jay Larson | Jenny Zigrino | |

=== June ===
| No. | Original release date | Guest(s) | Musical/entertainment guest(s) | Ref. |
|---|---|---|---|---|
| 735 | June 1, 2015 | Joel McHale, Jake Tapper | Courtney Barnett | |
| 736 | June 2, 2015 | Kellan Lutz, Jeff Ross | Gary Gulman | |
| 737 | June 3, 2015 | Thomas Middleditch, Rob Riggle | Spoon | |
| 738 | June 4, 2015 | Nick Offerman, Jen Kirkman | My Morning Jacket | |
| 739 | June 8, 2015 | Tim Robbins, Marc Maron | The Milk Carton Kids | |
| 740 | June 9, 2015 | Larry King, Anna Chlumsky | Yelawolf featuring Travis Barker | |
| 741 | June 10, 2015 | Bryce Dallas Howard, Tony Hale | Zella Day | |
| 742 | June 11, 2015 | Chris Pratt, Eric Dane | Dawes | |
| 743 | June 15, 2015 | Jeff Garlin, Angie Harmon | Tim Minchin with Gabrielle Gutierrez, Mabel Tyler, and Mia Sinclair Jenness | |
| 744 | June 16, 2015 | Noah Wyle, Lea DeLaria | Wolf Alice | |
| 745 | June 17, 2015 | Steve Ballmer, Blake Anderson | Allen Stone | |
| 746 | June 18, 2015 | Josh Hutcherson, Chris Gethard | Drennon Davis and Karen Kilgariff | |
| 747 | June 22, 2015 | Judd Apatow, Ashley Tisdale | Fort Minor | |
| 748 | June 23, 2015 | Lauren Graham, Colin Quinn | Ray Wylie Hubbard | |
| 749 | June 24, 2015 | Michael Sheen, Kiersey Clemons | Houndmouth | |
| 750 | June 25, 2015 | Adam Scott & Jason Schwartzman, Natasha Lyonne | Mark Normand | |
| 751 | June 29, 2015 | Evangeline Lilly, Marshawn Lynch | Colony House | |
| 752 | June 30, 2015 | Kumail Nanjiani, Danielle Brooks | Miguel | |

=== July ===
| No. | Original release date | Guest(s) | Musical/entertainment guest(s) | Ref. |
|---|---|---|---|---|
| 753 | July 1, 2015 | Maya Rudolph, Hannibal Buress | Tove Lo | |
| 754 | July 2, 2015 | Jane Lynch, Conor McGregor | John Roy | |
| 755 | July 8, 2015 | Elijah Wood, Chris Hardwick | N/A | |
| 756 | July 9, 2015 | The Stars of The Hunger Games: Mockingjay – Part 2 | N/A | |
| 757 | July 10, 2015 | The Stars of The Walking Dead, The Stars of Game of Thrones | N/A | |
| 758 | July 11, 2015 | The Stars of X-Men: Apocalypse | N/A | |
| 759 | July 13, 2015 | Jack Black, Boy George | Death Cab for Cutie | |
| 760 | July 14, 2015 | Emma Stone, Lindsey Vonn | JD McPherson | |
| 761 | July 15, 2015 | Curtis "50 Cent" Jackson, Anders Holm | Father John Misty | |
| 762 | July 16, 2015 | Paul Rudd, Wyatt Cenac | James Smith | |

=== August ===
| No. | Original release date | Guest(s) | Musical/entertainment guest(s) | Ref. |
|---|---|---|---|---|
| 763 | August 3, 2015 | Ice-T & Coco, Jimmy Pardo | N/A | |
| 764 | August 4, 2015 | Ryan Reynolds, Judy Greer | Catfish and the Bottlemen | |
| 765 | August 5, 2015 | Armie Hammer, Niecy Nash | Leon Bridges | |
| 766 | August 6, 2015 | Christina Applegate, Nat Faxon | Tom Papa | |
| 767 | August 10, 2015 | Matt LeBlanc, Jessica St. Clair | Hot Chip | |
| 768 | August 11, 2015 | Ice Cube & O'Shea Jackson Jr., Adam Pally | Alabama Shakes | |
| 769 | August 12, 2015 | Jason Segel, Ruby Rose | Jason Isbell | |
| 770 | August 13, 2015 | Kevin Bacon, John H. Sununu | Maggie Maye | |
| 771 | August 17, 2015 | Sir Patrick Stewart, Lucy Punch | Grace Potter | |
| 772 | August 18, 2015 | Lisa Kudrow, Uzo Aduba | Bully | |
| 773 | August 19, 2015 | J. B. Smoove, Tig Notaro | Langhorne Slim, The Both | |
| 774 | August 20, 2015 | Bill Hader, Bill Burr | Sam Morril | |
| 775 | August 24, 2015 | Jeff Goldblum, Jerrod Carmichael | Marina Franklin | |
| 776 | August 25, 2015 | Kristin Chenoweth, Andy Daly | Unknown Mortal Orchestra | |
| 777 | August 26, 2015 | Jeffrey Tambor, Al Madrigal | Ashley Monroe | |
| 778 | August 27, 2015 | Conan Scrapisode II | N/A | |

=== September ===
| No. | Original release date | Guest(s) | Musical/entertainment guest(s) | Ref. |
|---|---|---|---|---|
| 779 | September 14, 2015 | Jim Gaffigan, Chelsea Peretti | Blackberry Smoke | |
| 780 | September 15, 2015 | Paul Bettany, David Drew Howe and Pam Howe | Nathaniel Rateliff & The Night Sweats | |
| 781 | September 16, 2015 | David Oyelowo, Asa Butterfield | JR JR | |
| 782 | September 17, 2015 | Thomas Middleditch, Emily Mortimer | Andrew Sleighter | |
| 783 | September 21, 2015 | Fred Armisen, Chrissie Hynde | Circa Waves | |
| 784 | September 22, 2015 | Sharon Osbourne, Donald Glover | Caleb Synan | |
| 785 | September 23, 2015 | Tim Allen, Ta'Rhonda Jones | Gary Clark, Jr. | |
| 786 | September 24, 2015 | Billy Gardell, Kristen Schaal | Kurt Vile | |
| 787 | September 28, 2015 | Terry Crews, Jenna Coleman | Tom Clark | |
| 788 | September 29, 2015 | Joseph Gordon-Levitt, Ike Barinholtz | Andrew McMahon in the Wilderness | |
| 789 | September 30, 2015 | Kunal Nayyar, Ed Burns | EL VY | |

=== October ===
| No. | Original release date | Guest(s) | Musical/entertainment guest(s) | Ref. |
|---|---|---|---|---|
| 790 | October 1, 2015 | Benicio del Toro, Starlee Kine | Watkins Family Hour | |
| 791 | October 5, 2015 | Kevin Nealon, Randall Park | Paul Weller | |
| 792 | October 6, 2015 | Elliot Page, Gustavo Dudamel | Randy Liedtke | |
| 793 | October 7, 2015 | David Mizejewski, Nasim Pedrad | Robert DeLong | |
| 794 | October 8, 2015 | Aaron Sorkin, Artie Lange | Beirut | |
| 795 | October 19, 2015 | Elijah Wood, John Fogerty | Richard Thompson | |
| 796 | October 20, 2015 | Gabrielle Union | Marian Hill | |
| 797 | October 21, 2015 | Elvis Costello, Nathan Fielder | La Santa Cecilia | |
| 798 | October 22, 2015 | Sarah Silverman, Paige | Megan Gailey | |
| 799 | October 26, 2015 | Zachary Quinto, Brent Morin | Warren Haynes | |
| 800 | October 27, 2015 | Kate Bosworth, Michael Carbonaro | Jack Garratt | |
| 801 | October 28, 2015 | The Inside the NBA Studio Team, Andy Kindler | Melanie Martinez | |
| 802 | October 29, 2015 | Dr. Phil, Aya Cash | Ahmed Bharoocha | |

=== November ===
| No. | Original release date | Guest(s) | Musical/entertainment guest(s) | Ref. |
|---|---|---|---|---|
| 803 | November 9, 2015 | Antonio Banderas, Charlyne Yi | Ed Gamble | |
| 804 | November 10, 2015 | Chiwetel Ejiofor, Phil Rosenthal | Sean Donnelly | |
| 805 | November 11, 2015 | Jesse Eisenberg, Lou Diamond Phillips | Six-String Soldiers | |
| 806 | November 12, 2015 | Daniel Radcliffe, Betsy Brandt | Saint Motel | |
| 807 | November 16, 2015 | Aziz Ansari, Lizzy Caplan | Billy Gibbons | |
| 808 | November 17, 2015 | Conan in Armenia | N/A | |
| 809 | November 18, 2015 | John Cleese, Michaela Watkins | Trey Anastasio | |
| 810 | November 19, 2015 | Jennifer Lawrence, Ron Funches | Ian Karmel | |
| 811 | November 30, 2015 | David Spade, Jenna Dewan Tatum | Dan Cummins | |

=== December ===
| No. | Original release date | Guest(s) | Musical/entertainment guest(s) | Ref. |
|---|---|---|---|---|
| 812 | December 1, 2015 | Tom Jones, Oliver Hudson | Tom Jones | |
| 813 | December 2, 2015 | Ken Jeong, Amy Brenneman | Glen Hansard | |
| 814 | December 3, 2015 | Will Forte, Kether Donohue | Weezer | |
| 815 | December 7, 2015 | Adam Scott, Morris Chestnut | Sharon Jones & The Dap-Kings | |
| 816 | December 8, 2015 | Cindy Crawford, Chris D'Elia | Nick Lowe & Los Straitjackets | |
| 817 | December 9, 2015 | Anna Faris, Deepak Chopra | Moody McCarthy | |
| 818 | December 10, 2015 | Ron Howard, Sarah Vowell | Lukas Graham | |
| 819 | December 14, 2015 | Andy Serkis, Krysten Ritter | Drennon Davis & Karen Kilgariff | |
| 820 | December 15, 2015 | Larry King, Pete Holmes | Beach House | |
| 821 | December 16, 2015 | Dick Van Dyke, Bill Burr | The Brian Setzer Orchestra | |
| 822 | December 17, 2015 | The Cast of Star Wars: The Force Awakens | N/A | |
