= List of Conan episodes (2019) =

Conan
- No. of episodes: 123

Release
- Original network: TBS
- Original release: January 22 – December 19, 2019

Season chronology
- ← Previous; 2018 episodes Next → 2020 episodes

This list of episodes of Conan details information on the 2019 episodes of Conan, a television program on TBS hosted by Conan O'Brien. The last four shows of July were recorded at San Diego Comic-Con.

== 2019 ==
=== January ===
No.	Original release date	Guest(s)	Musical/entertainment guest(s)	Ref.
1211	January 22, 2019	Tom Hanks	N/A	
1212	January 23, 2019	The Cast of The Good Place	N/A	
1213	January 24, 2019	Bill Hader	N/A	
1214	January 28, 2019	Tig Notaro	N/A	
1215	January 29, 2019	Steven Yeun	Corey Rodrigues	
1216	January 30, 2019	Pete Holmes	N/A	
1217	January 31, 2019	Matt LeBlanc	Gary Gulman	

=== February ===
No.	Original release date	Guest(s)	Musical/entertainment guest(s)	Ref.
1218	February 4, 2019	Jeff Goldblum	N/A	
1219	February 5, 2019	Jean-Claude Van Damme	Sam Morril	
1220	February 6, 2019	Taraji P. Henson & Tracy Morgan	N/A	
1221	February 7, 2019	Nick Kroll	N/A	
1222	February 11, 2019	Nikki Glaser	N/A	
1223	February 12, 2019	Daniel Radcliffe	N/A	
1224	February 13, 2019	Jay Baruchel	N/A	
1225	February 14, 2019	Aubrey Plaza	Jenny Zigrino	
1226	February 25, 2019	Ben Sinclair	Mo Welch	
1227	February 26, 2019	Javier Bardem	N/A	
1228	February 27, 2019	Cedric the Entertainer	N/A	
1229	February 28, 2019	Maya Erskine & Anna Konkle	N/A	

=== March ===
No.	Original release date	Guest(s)	Musical/entertainment guest(s)	Ref.
1230	March 4, 2019	Deon Cole	N/A	
1231	March 5, 2019	Daniel Sloss	N/A	
1232	March 6, 2019	Ron Funches	N/A	
1233	March 7, 2019	Judd Apatow	Rachel Feinstein	
1234	March 11, 2019	Bert Kreischer	N/A	
1235	March 12, 2019	Timothy Olyphant	N/A	
1236	March 13, 2019	Kathy Bates	N/A	
1237	March 14, 2019	Moses Storm	Moses Storm	
1238	March 18, 2019	Ray Romano	N/A	
1239	March 19, 2019	Isla Fisher	Mark Normand	
1240	March 20, 2019	John Mulaney	N/A	
1241	March 21, 2019	Gad Elmaleh	N/A	

=== April ===
No.	Original release date	Guest(s)	Musical/entertainment guest(s)	Ref.
1242	April 8, 2019	John Bradley	N/A	
1243	April 9, 2019	Patton Oswalt	N/A	
1244	April 10, 2019	Sean Penn	N/A	
1245	April 11, 2019	Bill Burr	N/A	
1246	April 15, 2019	Taylor Schilling	N/A	
1247	April 16, 2019	Taylor Tomlinson	Taylor Tomlinson	
1248	April 17, 2019	Conan Without Borders: Australia	N/A	
1249	April 17, 2019	Jim Jefferies	N/A	
1250	April 18, 2019	Bill Hader	N/A	
1251	April 22, 2019	Isaac Hempstead Wright	N/A	
1252	April 23, 2019	Vir Das	N/A	
1253	April 24, 2019	Howie Mandel	N/A	
1254	April 25, 2019	Jon Rudnitsky	Jon Rudnitsky	
1255	April 29, 2019	Nore Davis	Nore Davis	
1256	April 30, 2019	Dax Shepard	N/A	

=== May ===
No.	Original release date	Guest(s)	Musical/entertainment guest(s)	Ref.
1257	May 1, 2019	Tony Hale	N/A	
1258	May 2, 2019	Kevin Nealon	N/A	
1259	May 6, 2019	Martin Short	N/A	
1260	May 7, 2019	Liam Cunningham	N/A	
1261	May 8, 2019	David Cross	N/A	
1262	May 9, 2019	Sam Richardson	Rose Matafeo	
1263	May 20, 2019	Jim Gaffigan	N/A	
1264	May 21, 2019	Jake Tapper	N/A	
1265	May 22, 2019	Lisa Kudrow	N/A	
1266	May 23, 2019	Jason Mantzoukas	Nish Kumar	

=== June ===
No.	Original release date	Guest(s)	Musical/entertainment guest(s)	Ref.
1267	June 3, 2019	Thomas Middleditch	N/A	
1268	June 4, 2019	Chelsea Handler	Rhys Nicholson	
1269	June 5, 2019	Sophie Turner	N/A	
1270	June 6, 2019	Dana Carvey	N/A	
1271	June 10, 2019	Adam Sandler	N/A	
1272	June 11, 2019	Seth Green	N/A	
1273	June 12, 2019	Louie Anderson	Matt Braunger	
1274	June 13, 2019	Don Cheadle	N/A	

=== July ===
No.	Original release date	Guest(s)	Musical/entertainment guest(s)	Ref.
1275	July 8, 2019	Kevin Bacon	N/A	
1276	July 9, 2019	Tig Notaro	Becky Lucas	
1277	July 10, 2019	Adam Scott	N/A	
1278	July 11, 2019	Sona Movsesian^{[A]}	N/A	
1279	July 17, 2019	The Cast of It Chapter Two	N/A	
1280	July 18, 2019	Tom Cruise	N/A	
1281	July 19, 2019	The Cast of Veronica Mars	N/A	
1282	July 20, 2019	Orlando Bloom & Cara Delevingne	N/A	

=== August ===
No.	Original release date	Guest(s)	Musical/entertainment guest(s)	Ref.
1283	August 8, 2019	Ron Burgundy	Ron Burgundy	
1284	August 19, 2019	Gerard Butler	N/A	
1285	August 20, 2019	Marc Maron	N/A	
1286	August 21, 2019	Jane Lynch	N/A	
1287	August 22, 2019	Flula Borg	Mohanad Elshieky	
1288	August 26, 2019	Henry Winkler	N/A	
1289	August 27, 2019	Natasha Lyonne	N/A	
1290	August 28, 2019	Niecy Nash	N/A	
1291	August 29, 2019	Eva Longoria	N/A	

=== September ===
No.	Original release date	Guest(s)	Musical/entertainment guest(s)	Ref.
1292	September 3, 2019	Conan Without Borders: Greenland	N/A	
1293	September 16, 2019	Nikki Glaser	N/A	
1294	September 17, 2019	Seann William Scott	Jena Friedman	
1295	September 18, 2019	CONAN Scrapisode	N/A	
1296	September 19, 2019	D'Arcy Carden	N/A	
1297	September 23, 2019	Jeffrey Dean Morgan	N/A	
1298	September 24, 2019	Anna Faris	Gavin Matts	
1299	September 25, 2019	Gary Gulman	N/A	
1300	September 26, 2019	Al Franken	N/A	

=== October ===
No.	Original release date	Guest(s)	Musical/entertainment guest(s)	Ref.
1301	October 21, 2019	Rosario Dawson	Dulcé Sloan	
1302	October 22, 2019	Paul Rudd	N/A	
1303	October 23, 2019	Tim Robbins	N/A	
1304	October 24, 2019	Megan Mullally	N/A	
1305	October 28, 2019	Edward Norton	Alex Edelman	
1306	October 29, 2019	Aaron Paul	N/A	
1307	October 30, 2019	Deon Cole	N/A	
1308	October 31, 2019	Ewan McGregor	N/A	

=== November ===
No.	Original release date	Guest(s)	Musical/entertainment guest(s)	Ref.
1309	November 4, 2019	Matt Damon	N/A	
1310	November 5, 2019	Bert Kreischer	N/A	
1311	November 6, 2019	Willem Dafoe	Emily Catalano	
1312	November 7, 2019	Conan Without Borders: Ghana	N/A	
1313	November 7, 2019	Lil Rel Howery	N/A	
1314	November 11, 2019	Kevin Nealon	N/A	
1315	November 12, 2019	Lizzy Caplan	D.J. Demers	
1316	November 13, 2019	Jenny Slate	N/A	
1317	November 14, 2019	Zach Woods	N/A	
1318	November 18, 2019	Nicole Byer	N/A	
1319	November 19, 2019	Thomas Middleditch	Giulia Rozzi	
1320	November 20, 2019	Dax Shepard	N/A	
1321	November 21, 2019	Fred Armisen	N/A	

=== December ===
No.	Original release date	Guest(s)	Musical/entertainment guest(s)	Ref.
1322	December 2, 2019	Adam Scott	N/A	
1323	December 3, 2019	Jay Baruchel	Garrett Millerick	
1324	December 4, 2019	Kristin Chenoweth	N/A	
1325	December 5, 2019	Jameela Jamil	N/A	
1326	December 9, 2019	Laurence Fishburne	N/A	
1327	December 10, 2019	Rory Scovel	Valerie Tosi	
1328	December 11, 2019	Giancarlo Esposito	N/A	
1329	December 12, 2019	John Lithgow	N/A	
1330	December 16, 2019	Ron Funches	N/A	
1331	December 17, 2019	"Weird Al" Yankovic	Stuart Goldsmith	
1332	December 18, 2019	Whitney Cummings	N/A	
1333	December 19, 2019	Adam Sandler	N/A	

== Notes ==
^{A} Kumail Nanjiani was originally scheduled as the guest for the July 11 episode to promote the film Stuber but had to cancel at the last minute due to scheduling conflicts with production on Silicon Valley. O'Brien's assistant Sona Movsesian was interviewed in his place.
