= List of Conan episodes (2020) =

Conan
- No. of episodes: 118

Release
- Original network: TBS
- Original release: January 13 – December 17, 2020

Season chronology
- ← Previous; 2019 episodes Next → 2021 episodes

This list of episodes of Conan details information on the 2020 episodes of Conan, a television program on TBS hosted by Conan O'Brien.

== 2020 ==
=== January ===
No.	Original release date	Guest(s)	Musical/entertainment guest(s)	Ref.
1334	January 13, 2020	Jim Gaffigan	N/A	
1335	January 14, 2020	Walton Goggins	Fahim Anwar	
1336	January 15, 2020	Larry David	N/A	
1337	January 16, 2020	Ilana Glazer	N/A	
1338	January 20, 2020	Josh Gad	Kyle Ayers	
1339	January 21, 2020	Jeff Goldblum	N/A	
1340	January 22, 2020	Steve Buscemi	N/A	
1341	January 23, 2020	Pete Holmes	N/A	
1342	January 27, 2020	Keegan-Michael Key	N/A	
1343	January 28, 2020	Kumail Nanjiani	N/A	
1344	January 29, 2020	Jesse Tyler Ferguson	Ray Harrington	
1345	January 30, 2020	Drew & Jonathan Scott	N/A	

=== February ===
No.	Original release date	Guest(s)	Musical/entertainment guest(s)	Ref.
1346	February 3, 2020	Antonio Banderas	N/A	
1347	February 4, 2020	J. B. Smoove	N/A	
1348	February 5, 2020	Diego Luna	N/A	
1349	February 6, 2020	Jeff Garlin	N/A	
1350	February 10, 2020	Elijah Wood	Ty Barnett	
1351	February 11, 2020	Jim Carrey	N/A	
1352	February 12, 2020	Tom Papa	N/A	
1353	February 13, 2020	Will Arnett	N/A	
1354	February 24, 2020	Paul Reubens	N/A	
1355	February 25, 2020	Rob McElhenney	Sam Morril	
1356	February 26, 2020	Wanda Sykes	N/A	
1357	February 27, 2020	Steve Coogan	N/A	

=== March ===
No.	Original release date	Guest(s)	Musical/entertainment guest(s)	Ref.
1358	March 2, 2020	Flula Borg	Cameron Esposito	
1359	March 3, 2020	Joel McHale	N/A	
1360	March 4, 2020	America Ferrera	N/A	
1361	March 5, 2020	Timothy Olyphant	N/A	
1362	March 9, 2020	Kristen Schaal	Sklar Brothers	
1363	March 10, 2020	Nikki Glaser	N/A	
1364	March 11, 2020	Norman Reedus	N/A	
1365	March 12, 2020	Nick Offerman	N/A	
1366	March 30, 2020	Adam Sandler	N/A	
1367	March 31, 2020	Sophie Turner	N/A	

=== April ===
No.	Original release date	Guest(s)	Musical/entertainment guest(s)	Ref.
1368	April 1, 2020	Jesse Eisenberg	N/A	
1369	April 2, 2020	Sean Hayes	N/A	
1370	April 6, 2020	Tracy Morgan	N/A	
1371	April 7, 2020	Stephen Colbert	N/A	
1372	April 8, 2020	Kevin Bacon	N/A	
1373	April 9, 2020	Tig Notaro	N/A	
1374	April 13, 2020	Nick Kroll	N/A	
1375	April 14, 2020	Keegan-Michael Key	N/A	
1376	April 15, 2020	Russell Brand	N/A	
1377	April 16, 2020	Julia Louis-Dreyfus	N/A	
1378	April 20, 2020	Bob Odenkirk	N/A	
1379	April 21, 2020	Lin-Manuel Miranda	N/A	
1380	April 22, 2020	Shaquille O'Neal	N/A	
1381	April 23, 2020	Kaley Cuoco	N/A	
1382	April 27, 2020	Martin Short	N/A	
1383	April 28, 2020	Joel McHale	N/A	
1384	April 29, 2020	D'Arcy Carden	N/A	
1385	April 30, 2020	Chris O'Dowd	Jon Dore	

=== May ===
No.	Original release date	Guest(s)	Musical/entertainment guest(s)	Ref.
1386	May 4, 2020	Shailene Woodley	N/A	
1387	May 5, 2020	Hank Azaria	N/A	
1388	May 6, 2020	Kristin Chenoweth	N/A	
1389	May 7, 2020	Lizzy Caplan	N/A	
1390	May 11, 2020	Ed Helms	N/A	
1391	May 12, 2020	Chris Gethard	N/A	
1392	May 13, 2020	Luke Wilson	N/A	
1393	May 14, 2020	Nikki Glaser	N/A	

=== June ===
No.	Original release date	Guest(s)	Musical/entertainment guest(s)	Ref.
1394	June 1, 2020	Van Jones	N/A	
1395	June 3, 2020	W. Kamau Bell	N/A	
1396	June 4, 2020	Sam Richardson	N/A	
1397	June 8, 2020	Melvin Carter	N/A	
1398	June 9, 2020	Ron Funches	N/A	
1399	June 10, 2020	Cory Booker	N/A	
1400	June 11, 2020	Nicole Byer	N/A	

=== July ===
No.	Original release date	Guest(s)	Musical/entertainment guest(s)	Ref.
1401	July 6, 2020	Will Ferrell	N/A	
1402	July 7, 2020	Rob Lowe	N/A	
1403	July 8, 2020	Lisa Kudrow	N/A	
1404	July 9, 2020	Jameela Jamil	N/A	
1405	July 13, 2020	Lauren Lapkus	N/A	
1406	July 14, 2020	John Lithgow	N/A	
1407	July 15, 2020	Chris Redd	N/A	
1408	July 16, 2020	Emily Mortimer	N/A	
1409	July 20, 2020	Don Cheadle	N/A	
1410	July 21, 2020	Patton Oswalt	N/A	
1411	July 22, 2020	Jim Gaffigan	N/A	
1412	July 23, 2020	Andy Samberg	N/A	

=== August ===
No.	Original release date	Guest(s)	Musical/entertainment guest(s)	Ref.
1413	August 31, 2020	Jason Sudeikis	N/A	

=== September ===
No.	Original release date	Guest(s)	Musical/entertainment guest(s)	Ref.
1414	September 1, 2020	J. B. Smoove	N/A	
1415	September 2, 2020	Rory Scovel	N/A	
1416	September 3, 2020	Method Man	N/A	
1417	September 8, 2020	Judd Apatow	N/A	
1418	September 9, 2020	Beth Stelling	N/A	
1419	September 10, 2020	Kevin Nealon	N/A	
1420	September 14, 2020	Ralph Macchio	N/A	
1421	September 15, 2020	Melissa Villaseñor	N/A	
1422	September 16, 2020	Kiersey Clemons	N/A	
1423	September 17, 2020	Alec Baldwin	N/A	
1424	September 21, 2020	DIY Conan	N/A	
1425	September 22, 2020	Evan Rachel Wood	N/A	
1426	September 23, 2020	Michelle Obama	N/A	
1427	September 24, 2020	Jane Lynch	N/A	

=== October ===
No.	Original release date	Guest(s)	Musical/entertainment guest(s)	Ref.
1428	October 26, 2020	Heidi Gardner	N/A	
1429	October 27, 2020	Bert Kreischer	N/A	
1430	October 28, 2020	Natasha Lyonne	N/A	
1431	October 29, 2020	Simon Pegg	N/A	

=== November ===
No.	Original release date	Guest(s)	Musical/entertainment guest(s)	Ref.
1432	November 2, 2020	Andy Daly	N/A	
1433	November 3, 2020	Conan Repeat Election Night Special	N/A	
1434	November 4, 2020	Al Franken	N/A	
1435	November 5, 2020	Nicolle Wallace	N/A	
1436	November 9, 2020	John C. Reilly	N/A	
1437	November 10, 2020	Zach Braff	N/A	
1438	November 11, 2020	Laci Mosley	N/A	
1439	November 12, 2020	David Oyelowo	N/A	
1440	November 16, 2020	Ricky Gervais	N/A	
1441	November 17, 2020	Tracee Ellis Ross	N/A	
1442	November 18, 2020	Thomas Middleditch	N/A	
1443	November 19, 2020	Sarah Silverman	N/A	

=== December ===
No.	Original release date	Guest(s)	Musical/entertainment guest(s)	Ref.
1444	December 7, 2020	Heather Graham	N/A	
1445	December 8, 2020	Marshawn Lynch	N/A	
1446	December 9, 2020	Andrew Rannells	N/A	
1447	December 10, 2020	Joe Manganiello	N/A	
1448	December 14, 2020	Jay Pharoah	N/A	
1449	December 15, 2020	Diego Luna	N/A	
1450	December 16, 2020	Christopher Walken	N/A	
1451	December 17, 2020	Sienna Miller	Calvin Evans	
