= Race to Escape =

American television series

- Genre: Game show Reality
- Starring: Jimmy Pardo
- Country of origin: United States
- No. of seasons: 1
- No. of episodes: 6

Production
- Executive producers: John Morayniss; Kevin Healey; Riaz Patel; Rocky Collins; Tara Long
- Running time: 60 minutes (includes adverts)
- Production companies: Axial Entertainment; Entertainment One Television

Original release
- Network: Science Channel
- Release: July 25 – August 29, 2015

Race to Escape is an American reality competition television series, produced by Axial Entertainment and Entertainment One Television for the Science Channel. It was originally announced in April 2015.

The escape room themed series, hosted by comedian Jimmy Pardo, sees two teams of three competitors compete against each other, attempting to solve a series of psychological clues or puzzles in an attempt to escape a themed room. The teams compete for a prize worth US$25,000 each episode.

== Format ==
Two teams of three players are placed in two identical escape rooms, differently only by color (red and blue) to be able to tell the rooms apart. They are generally locked or handcuffed in place prior to the start of the game. Once the game starts, each team has an hour to try to figure out five four-digit codes in a sequence of puzzles to escape the room, and to beat the other team to do so. Each team starts with the chance to win $25,000, but after 20 minutes, each minute they remain in the room costs them $500.

Once the puzzle starts, the players in teams work together to figure out the puzzles. The first puzzle requires the players to figure out how to free themselves from their locks and then to find the solution code associated with that escape. Subsequent puzzles start by teams receiving one or more items from a clue drawer, as well as possibly a cryptic clue on the screen near the drawer. Each of these puzzles lead to another four-digit code. The puzzles are designed to be logical, and not require random guesses or leaps of logic.

Once they have a code or a guess for a code, the players enter that on a panel near the escape door. If it is right, they move onto the next puzzle (or escape), while the other team is made aware of this by their room's lights going out briefly. A team can enter up to 3 guesses for any puzzle without penalty, but after the 3rd entry, wrong answers will lock out this panel for two minutes. Except on the first and fifth puzzles, if teams are stumped by a puzzle after 5 minutes since the puzzle start, they can opt as a group to use the "Code Breaker" for that puzzle, which explains the steps to solve the puzzle. This costs the team $5,000 of their potential winnings. As such, it is possible to win the game but have no money left in their pot.

In any points of the episodes, Jimmy would explain the psychological terms that were used by the players during the game.

== Broadcast ==
The series premiered in the U.S. on July 25, 2015 on the Science Channel.

Internationally, the series premiered in Australia on September 9, 2015 on Discovery Science.

== Episodes ==
No.	Title	Original release date	U.S. viewers
1	"The Explorer's Study"	July 25, 2015	242,000
2	"The Chinese Restaurant"	August 1, 2015	305,000
3	"Bar Fight"	August 8, 2015	227,000
4	"Schoolhouse Lock"	August 15, 2015	244,000
5	"The Auto Shop"	August 22, 2015	331,000
6	"Barbershop Breakout"	August 29, 2015	310,000

== Reception ==
=== Ratings ===
The series averaged 397,000 total viewers, an increase of 19% on the Science Channel's primetime average in the year-to-date.

=== Review ===
Daily News journalist David Hinckley gave the program three out of five stars, describing it as "not the best competition game show ever, [but] it's decent summer fun."
