= List of Conan episodes (2021) =

Conan
- No. of episodes: 59

Release
- Original network: TBS
- Original release: January 18 – June 24, 2021

Season chronology
- ← Previous; 2020 episodes Next →

This list of episodes of Conan details information on the 2021 episodes of Conan, a television program on TBS hosted by Conan O'Brien.

== 2021 ==
=== January ===
No.	Original release date	Guest(s)	Musical/entertainment guest(s)	Ref.
1452	January 18, 2021	Bob Newhart	N/A	
1453	January 19, 2021	Aubrey Plaza	N/A	
1454	January 20, 2021	Max Greenfield	N/A	
1455	January 21, 2021	Rachel Brosnahan	N/A	
1456	January 25, 2021	Nicole Byer	N/A	
1457	January 26, 2021	Jason Segel	N/A	
1458	January 27, 2021	George Wallace	N/A	
1459	January 28, 2021	Phoebe Dynevor	N/A	

=== February ===
No.	Original release date	Guest(s)	Musical/entertainment guest(s)	Ref.
1460	February 1, 2021	Jay Baruchel	N/A	
1461	February 2, 2021	Mike Birbiglia	N/A	
1462	February 3, 2021	Kyra Sedgwick	N/A	
1463	February 4, 2021	Bryan Cranston	N/A	
1464	February 22, 2021	Wanda Sykes	N/A	
1465	February 23, 2021	Colin Quinn	N/A	
1466	February 24, 2021	Ted Danson	N/A	
1467	February 25, 2021	Kevin James	N/A	

=== March ===
No.	Original release date	Guest(s)	Musical/entertainment guest(s)	Ref.
1468	March 1, 2021	Chris Gethard	N/A	
1469	March 2, 2021	Randall Park	N/A	
1470	March 3, 2021	Lauren Cohan	N/A	
1471	March 4, 2021	Paul Bettany	N/A	
1472	March 8, 2021	Fortune Feimster	N/A	
1473	March 9, 2021	Ron Funches	N/A	
1474	March 10, 2021	Chris "Ludacris" Bridges	N/A	
1475	March 11, 2021	Anthony Anderson	N/A	
1476	March 15, 2021	Kenan Thompson	N/A	
1477	March 16, 2021	Louie Anderson	N/A	
1478	March 17, 2021	Joel McHale	N/A	

=== April ===
No.	Original release date	Guest(s)	Musical/entertainment guest(s)	Ref.
1479	April 5, 2021	Will Forte	N/A	
1480	April 6, 2021	Nikki Glaser	N/A	
1481	April 7, 2021	Lil Rel Howery	N/A	
1482	April 8, 2021	Baratunde Thurston	N/A	
1483	April 12, 2021	Steven Yeun	N/A	
1484	April 13, 2021	Jeffrey Dean Morgan	N/A	
1485	April 14, 2021	Howie Mandel	N/A	
1486	April 15, 2021	Russell Brand	N/A	

=== May ===
No.	Original release date	Guest(s)	Musical/entertainment guest(s)	Ref.
1487	May 3, 2021	Nasim Pedrad	N/A	
1488	May 4, 2021	Gal Gadot	N/A	
1489	May 5, 2021	Flula Borg	N/A	
1490	May 6, 2021	W. Kamau Bell	N/A	
1491	May 10, 2021	Sean Hayes	N/A	
1492	May 11, 2021	Michelle Buteau	N/A	
1493	May 12, 2021	Lisa Kudrow	N/A	
1494	May 13, 2021	Andy Cohen	N/A	
1495	May 17, 2021	Timothy Olyphant	N/A	
1496	May 18, 2021	Deon Cole	N/A	
1497	May 19, 2021	Charles Barkley	N/A	
1498	May 20, 2021	Bill Burr	N/A	

=== June ===
No.	Original release date	Guest(s)	Musical/entertainment guest(s)	Ref.
1499	June 7, 2021	Don Cheadle	N/A	
1500	June 8, 2021	Sarah Silverman	N/A	
1501	June 9, 2021	Kevin Nealon	N/A	
1502	June 10, 2021	Tig Notaro	N/A	
1503	June 14, 2021	Patton Oswalt	N/A	
1504	June 15, 2021	Martin Short	N/A	
1505	June 16, 2021	J. B. Smoove	N/A	
1506	June 17, 2021	Mila Kunis	N/A	
1507	June 21, 2021	Bill Hader	N/A	
1508	June 22, 2021	Seth Rogen	N/A	
1509	June 23, 2021	Dana Carvey	N/A	
1510	June 24, 2021	Jack Black	N/A	
