= Riyadh Comedy Festival =

2025 event in Saudi Arabia

Riyadh Comedy Festival مهرجان الرياض للكوميديا
- Official poster
- Genre: Comedy festival
- Dates: 26 September – 9 October 2025
- Venue: Boulevard City
- Locations: Riyadh, Saudi Arabia
- Founder: General Entertainment Authority

The Riyadh Comedy Festival (Arabic: مهرجان الرياض للكوميديا) was a Saudi Arabian government–sponsored comedy festival held from 26 September to 9 October 2025, at Boulevard City in Riyadh, Saudi Arabia. The festival featured many high-profile comedians and a variety of comedy styles, such as stand-up, satire, sketch and improv. The event was announced on 23 July 2025, by Turki Al-Sheikh, chairman of the General Entertainment Authority. It was part of Saudi Arabia's Vision 2030 strategy to position the country as a destination for international cultural and artistic events.

The event drew criticism due to Saudi Arabia's poor human rights record, as well as the censorship rules contractually imposed on the performers. Several comedians who were invited to perform declined and spoke out against it. Human rights organizations urged performers to speak out against any human rights abuses and not be complicit in any whitewashing of such abuses.

== Background ==
The Riyadh Comedy Festival was the first event of its kind to be hosted in Saudi Arabia. It aimed to position Riyadh as a hub for international cultural and artistic events, and to improve Saudi Arabia's global image.

== Participating acts ==
The comedians who appeared at the festival include:

- Mo Amer
- Aziz Ansari
- Wayne Brady
- Hannibal Buress
- Bill Burr
- Jimmy Carr
- Dave Chappelle
- Louis C.K.
- Whitney Cummings
- Pete Davidson
- Chris Distefano
- Omid Djalili
- Zarna Garg
- Ben Hart
- Kevin Hart
- Gabriel Iglesias
- Jimeoin
- Maz Jobrani
- Jessica Kirson
- Jo Koy
- Bobby Lee
- Sebastian Maniscalco
- Sam Morril
- Mark Normand
- Russell Peters
- Jeff Ross
- Sugar Sammy
- Andrew Santino
- Andrew Schulz
- Tom Segura
- Ali Siddiq
- Cipha Sounds
- Aries Spears
- Chris Tucker
- Jack Whitehall

Tim Dillon was removed from the list of performers due to jokes he made on his podcast about slavery in Saudi Arabia in which he nevertheless defended his decision to appear on the Festival. Nimesh Patel announced that he was dropping out of the festival on ethical grounds. After comments on Theo Von's podcast, Jim Jefferies was removed from the lineup.

== Reception ==
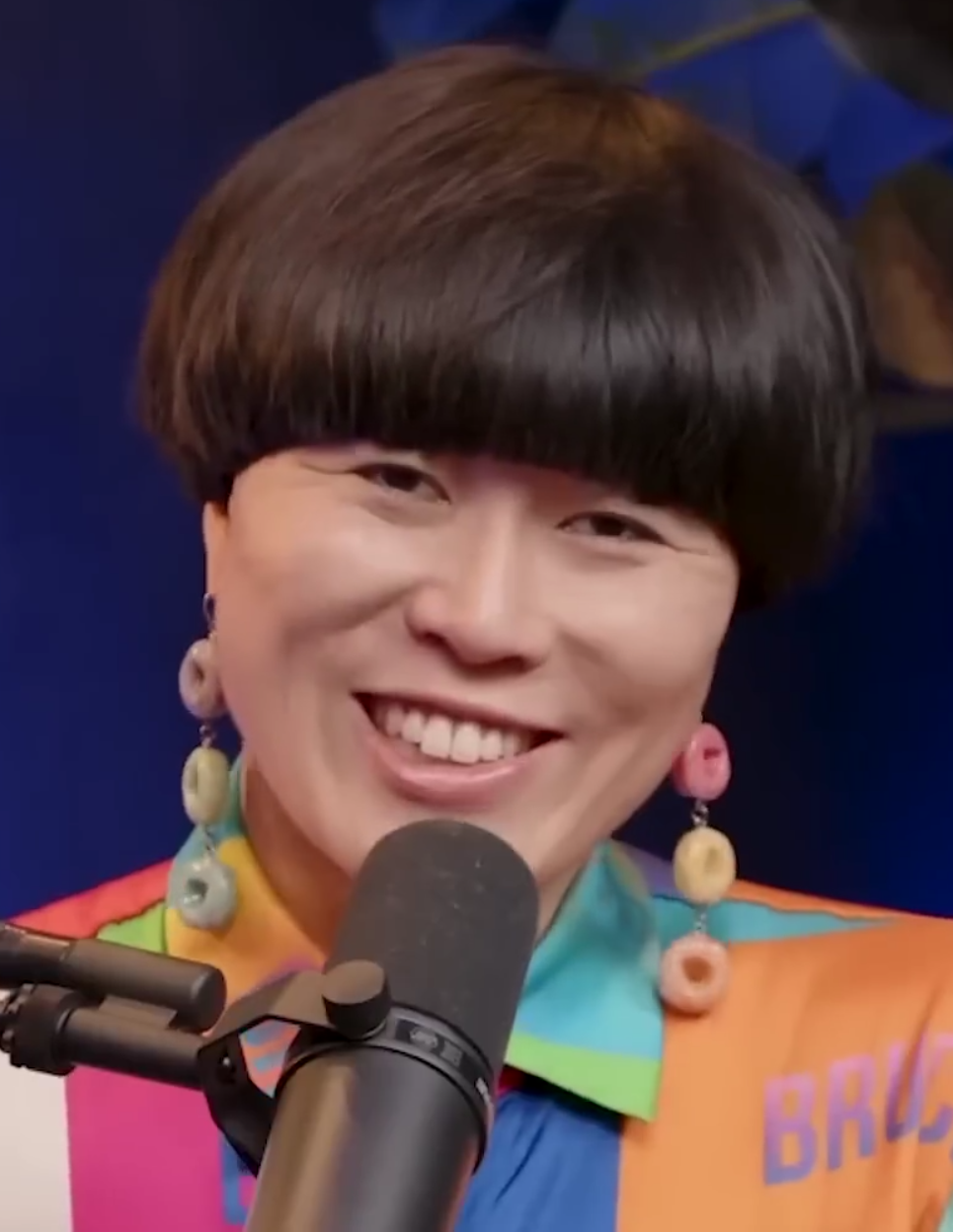
After declining an offer to perform at the Riyadh Comedy Festival, comedian Atsuko Okatsuka publicly shared details of content restrictions at the festival, prompting further media discourse around censorship and Saudi Arabia's human rights record.

The Riyadh Comedy Festival received criticism from several comedians and human rights organisations. Human Rights Watch accused the Saudi government of purportedly using the event to whitewash its image, and urged any performers at the event to call for the release of journalists and activists imprisoned in the Middle Eastern country.

Comedians Mike Birbiglia, Shane Gillis, Stavros Halkias, Leslie Liao, Atsuko Okatsuka and "Weird Al" Yankovic were invited to perform, but they ultimately declined and spoke out against the event. Some comedians who did not attend criticised their colleagues for putting "a fun face on [Saudi Arabia's] crimes against humanity." Some critics also noted the hypocrisy, stating that some comedians at the festival previously voiced complaints about the lack of free speech in stand-up comedy in the U.S. Okatsuka posted images of the offer she received, which she said included stipulations that the comedians could not perform material that violated certain Saudi censorship rules. Restricted topics included the country itself, its legal system, the Saudi royal family, and religion.

Other comedians, including Marc Maron and Zach Woods, criticised the event and the comedians performing there. Maron derided the prince and festival performers in a stand-up routine. Comedian Gianmarco Soresi stated in an interview on CNN that "these comedians are allowing their images and their reputations and, frankly, the brand of American stand-up comedy, to be exploited for propaganda" and that "it's embarrassing to go on stage and tell jokes that if some of the audience members tweeted from their own personal accounts, could lead to them being executed". David Cross wrote an open letter condemning the comedians who agreed to perform, writing that he was "disgusted, and deeply disappointed" that comedians he admired "would condone this totalitarian fiefdom for ... what, a fourth house? A boat? More sneakers?" and said they were "performing for blood money". He stated the comedians who performed who in their acts complain about lack of free speech and cancel culture were hypocritical. Cross concluded the open letter by encouraging people to donate to the Human Rights Foundation.

Some performing comedians defended accepting the offer. Prior to his firing, Tim Dillon stated he was offered US$375,000 to perform at the festival and that others were offered as much as US$1.6 million; he said: "You know, we comedians, we're looking the other way. They pay us enough to look the other way." Jim Jefferies argued that Saudi Arabia's human rights record was comparable to that of the United States, saying: "There's been a reporter who they killed. You don't think our government has fucking bumped people? I think Jeffrey Epstein was fucking bumped off". Jefferies later commented on criticism of the festival during an appearance on Theo Von's podcast in August, saying in reference to the 14 June execution of Turki al-Jasser in Saudi Arabia: "One reporter was killed by the government ... unfortunate, but not a fucking hill that I'm gonna die on," and argued it was for the greater good that "freedom-of-speech machines" like himself bring their "edgy" material to Saudi audiences. After making these remarks, Jefferies was removed from the festival's lineup, and his representatives did not respond to inquiries about the change.

Pete Davidson said he was offered enough money to overcome his reservations, saying: "I just, you know, get the routing and then I see the number and I go, 'I'll go'." Dave Chappelle joked during his routine at the festival that "It's easier to talk here than it is in America." Louis C.K. called his involvement in the festival positive and was surprised at the fact that the only restrictions on material were about the Saudi government and Islam. Bill Burr defended his appearance in the festival, calling it a "mind-blowing experience" and one of his "top three experiences". He stated that the Saudis were "just like" Americans, though he did note that jokes about the Saudi royals and religion were banned. Ben Schwartz of The Nation asked, "How can Burr ever get mad about billionaires here after insisting that the Saudi royal family over there is 'just like us'?", and noted that Burr had previously criticized singer Beyoncé for performing for Libyan leader Muammar Gaddafi.

Jessica Kirson, who is gay, apologized for participating in the festival despite Saudi Arabia's death penalty for same-sex relations, and said she is "committed" to donating her earnings from the performance to an unnamed human rights organization. Aziz Ansari defended his decision to perform and said he planned to donate a portion of his performance fees to Reporters Without Borders and Human Rights Watch. In response, a spokesperson for the Human Rights Watch said that they have been "critical of the comedians, including Mr. Ansari, who are performing in Saudi Arabia [because of] the government's human rights record", and will not accept donations from Ansari and other comedians who offered to donate as doing so could create the impression that Human Rights Watch had compromised their own independence.

== See also ==
- Sun City, South Africa § Music performances and boycotts – during apartheid
