= James Veitch (comedian) =

British comedian

- Education: Sarah Lawrence College; University of Aberdeen
- Occupation: Comedian
- Years active: 2006–present
- Website: veitch.me

James Veitch (/viːtʃ/) is an English comedian, mostly known for his comedy performances using slideshows and video effects that show interactions with authors of scam emails (known as scam baiting).

In 2020, several women accused Veitch of sexual assault and rape, leading to him being dropped by his agency.

== Early life ==
Veitch attended Sarah Lawrence College.

== Career ==
Veitch worked as a film editor on the 2006 film Papa Joe and as a digital intermediate conform artist on the 2008 movie Middle of Nowhere. In 2009, Veitch adapted John Keats's writings into a play for Keats House.

Veitch's first solo comedy show, The Fundamental Interconnectedness of Everyone with an Internet Connection, was launched at Brighton Fringe in May 2014 as part of the arts industry showcase WINDOW. The show ran in August at the Edinburgh Festival Fringe. It concerned scam emails, Veitch's humorous responses to them, and the nature of the Internet. The show was described by the Sunday Herald as "Topically brilliant comedy. Tears-down-the-face funny". His next Edinburgh Fringe show was Genius Bar in 2015, about his time in this role at Apple. Alice Jones of The Independent praised the "neat premise" used to explore the end of Veitch's relationship and the show's conclusion, but said that "the constituent parts still feel a little disjointed". Veitch authored Dot Con: The Art of Scamming a Scammer in 2015. A Kirkus Reviews article said that Veitch's "absurdist approach and enthusiasm for his work make for unpredictably funny reading".

He made two appearances on the talk show Conan. Veitch recorded three TED talks in 2015 and 2016. One chronicles Veitch's encounter with a supermarket chain's marketing emails, and the other two are about scam emails. Veitch also presented the Mashable video series "Scamalot" on YouTube. A Pleasance Courtyard performance in 2015 received praise from The Independent's Alice Jones, who stated that "Veitch has found a nerdy niche with his comic lectures about modern technology". In 2018, he starred in the Melbourne International Comedy Festival (Allstars Supershow). Veitch was a guest presenter on the live trivia gameshow HQ Trivia. In 2019, Veitch was the host of that year's Britannia Awards. He hosted a humorous investigative journalism series on BBC Radio 4 called James Veitch's Contractual Obligation. In August 2020, his comedy special, James Veitch: Straight to VHS, was released on HBO Max.

== Sexual misconduct allegations ==
On 1 September 2020 several women who attended Sarah Lawrence College with Veitch made rape allegations against him, with others accusing him of inappropriate behaviour. Veitch declined to comment on the allegations which were reported by Hollywood Reporter, "but a source close to him says he denies all allegations". HBO subsequently removed his comedy special from its streaming platform. Veitch was dropped by his agent and edited out of a Quibi show he was set to host. Though the BBC initially decided to retain Contractual Obligation on BBC Sounds, it was removed in early September 2020.
