= Nick Griffin (comedian) =

American comedian and writer

Nick Griffin (born December 23, 1966) is an American comedian and writer. He co-hosted the podcast Scary Monsters with Lori Palminteri where they discussed their weekly and scary encounters with other humans. He is a regular at the Comedy Cellar in New York City.

== Stand-Up Comedy ==
Griffin began his stand up career at the age of 20 in 1987 in Kansas City, before moving to New York in 1990, performing in midnight shows at Greenwich Village. He then moved to Los Angeles, becoming a staff writer for The Keenen Ivory Wayans Show in 1997 and later became the head writer for Bobby Slayton and Sue Murphy's morning radio show.

Griffin made his first major TV appearance on The Late Late Show with Craig Kilborn, and went on to become a regular on Premium Blend. He moved back to New York in 2006 and has performed on the Late Show with David Letterman (he did stand-up eleven times on Letterman), Conan, The Late Late Show with Craig Ferguson, The Late Show with Stephen Colbert and The Tonight Show with Jimmy Fallon.

Griffin 2019 special "Cheer Up" is streaming on Prime. Griffin released his 2023 special "Absolutely Wonderful" via 800 Pound Gorilla.
