= Jennifer Berman =

American urologist and television host

- Education: University of Maryland; Boston University; Hollins College (now known as Hollins University)
- Occupation: Urologist

Jennifer Ruth Berman is an American sexual health expert, urologist and female sexual medicine specialist. She is also a former co-host on the television show The Doctors.

== Media ==
Berman and her sister Laura Berman hosted a US national television program titled Berman and Berman on Discovery Health in 2002 and 2003. She has also appeared on Good Morning America, The Oprah Winfrey Show, The Today Show, CNN, CNBC, Conan, Below Deck Mediterranean and HLN.

== Education and training ==
Berman graduated from Hollins College (now Hollins University) in 1986 and the University of Maryland Medical Center where she received her Master of Science degree in 1989. She went on to receive her medical degree from Boston University School of Medicine. After obtaining her medical degree, she returned to the University of Maryland to complete her post-graduate urology residency and then completed her fellowship training at UCLA Medical Center for Female Urology and Female Pelvic Floor Reconstructive Surgery. In 2001, she was hired as the first director of the Female Sexual Medicine Center at UCLA, and was also an assistant professor of urology, which closed in 2005.
