= David Mizejewski =

American naturalist (born 1975)

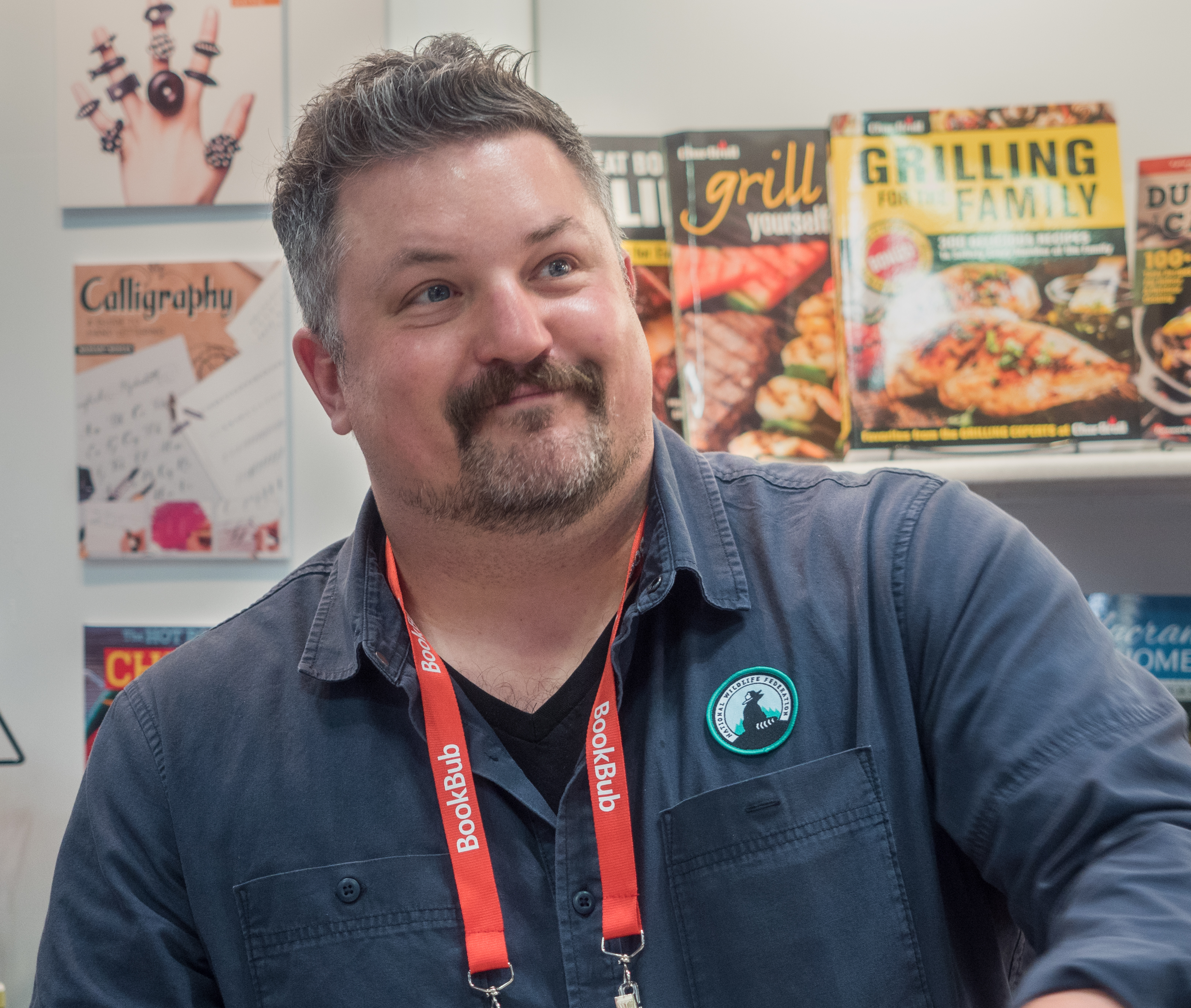
- David Mizejewski at BookExpo 2019
- Born: September 15, 1975 (age 51); Middletown, New Jersey, United States
- Presenting career
- Show: Backyard Habitat
- Network: Animal Planet
- Show: Today
- Network: NBC
- Country: United States
- Website: www.nwf.org/David-Mizejewski.aspx

David Mizejewski (born September 15, 1975) is a naturalist, television personality and a spokesperson for the National Wildlife Federation. He frequently appears as a wild life expert on talk shows such as Good Morning America, Conan,Today and The Wendy Williams Show.

== Early life ==
David Mizejewski graduated from Emory University in 1997 with a degree in Human and Natural Ecology.

== Career ==
Mizejewski is a graduate and board member of Emerging Wildlife Conservation Leaders (EWCL), an exclusive, two-year leadership training, networking, and mentoring program. He was one of twenty young conservationists to be nominated and selected for the inaugural class of this competitive program in 2005. He joined the board in 2008. Mizejewski has also sat on advisory groups for the North American Pollinator Protection Campaign, Biodiversity Council, Alliance for Workplace Excellence, OurEarth.org, and Mother Earth News magazine."

Mizejewski is the host of the Nat Geo WILD series Pet Talk, in which he helps people connect people to wildlife by helping them understand their pets and their wild ancestors. He also hosted and produced Animal Planet's Backyard Habitat, is a regular guest on NBC's Today Show, Conan, and ABC's Good Morning America. In addition to his television appearances, Mizejewski has worked as a wildlife consultant on motion picture productions such as Where the Wild Things Are and Legend of the Guardians.

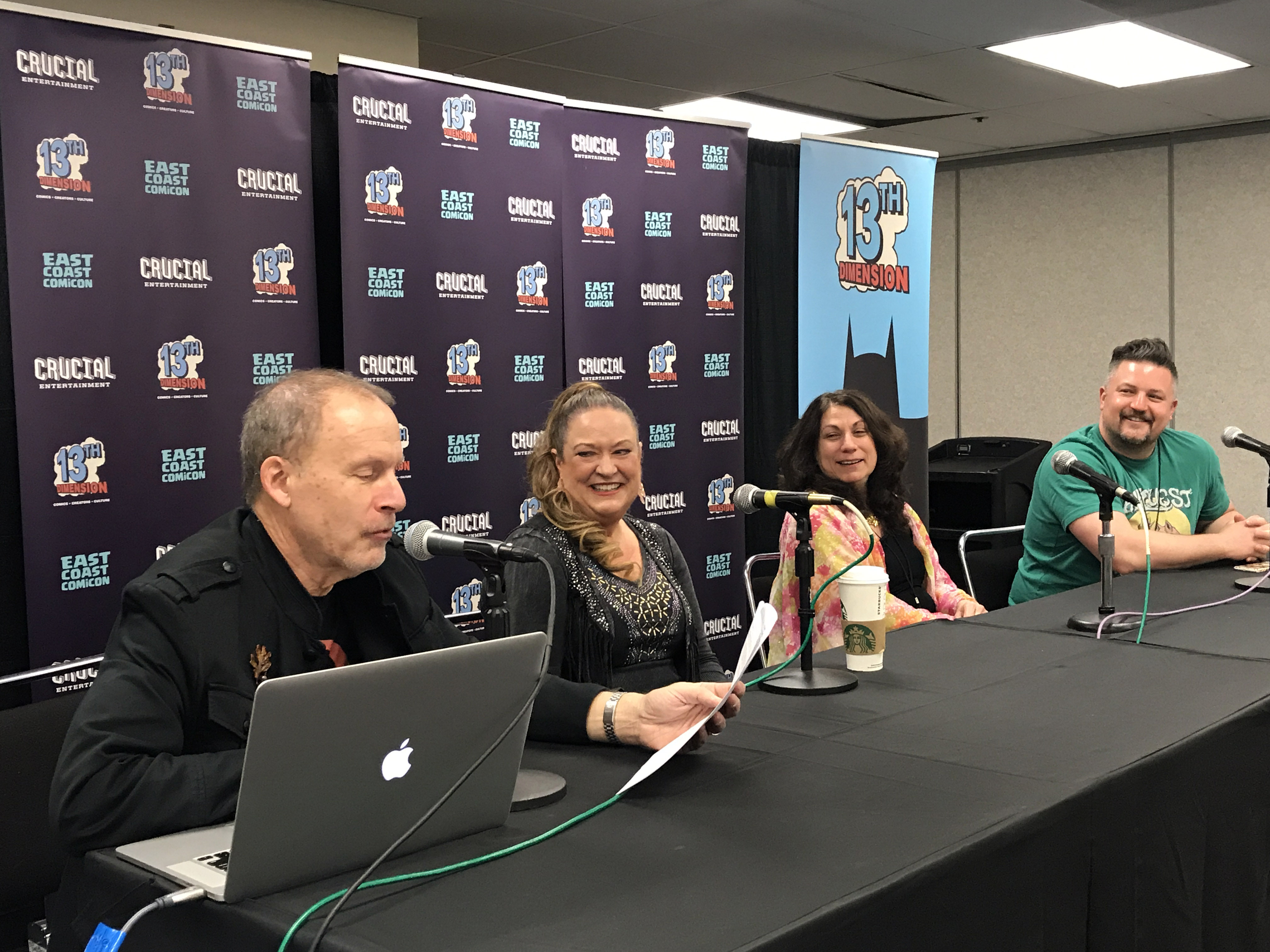
Mizejewski, at right, sitting on an Elfquest panel discussion at the 2018 East Coast Comicon in New Jersey

Mizejewski is the author of Attracting Birds, Butterflies and Other Backyard Wildlife, which won the 2005 Independent Book Publishers Association Benjamin Franklin Award for Gardening/Architecture. He is a contributor to Gardening How-To magazine and a contributing editor at Birds and Blooms magazine. Mizejewski has written several articles for The Huffington Post. Mizejewski also contributed an essay to the 2006 book Paws and Reflect: A Special Bond Between Man and Dog.

Mizejewski is the co-host of The Elfquest Show podcast.

== Personal life ==
Mizejewski lives in Maplewood, New Jersey, with his husband Justin. Their wedding was held in a rustic barn in Poolesville, Maryland on 7 November 2015.
