= Jimmy Pardo =

American comedian

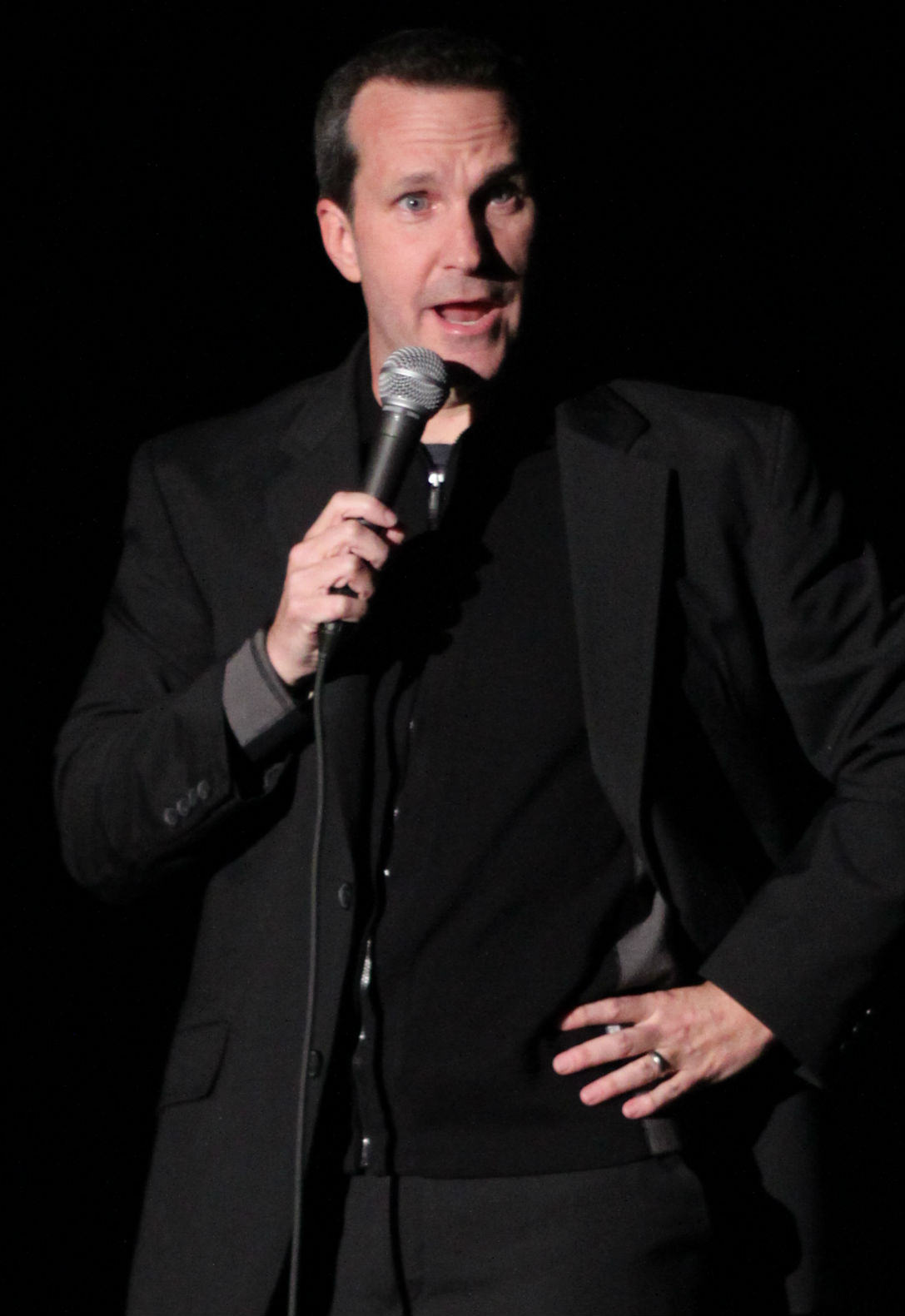
- Pardo performing at MaxFunCon 2009 in Lake Arrowhead, California
- Born: James Ronald Pardo, Jr. Chicago, Illinois, U.S.
- Notable work: Never Not Funny; The Tonight Show with Conan O'Brien; Conan
- Spouse: Danielle Koenig
- Children: 1
- Relatives: Walter Koenig (father-in-law); Andrew Koenig (brother-in-law)

Comedy career
- Years active: 1988–present
- Medium: Stand-up comedy, television, film, podcast
- Genres: Observational comedy, crowd work, insult comedy
- Subjects: Popular culture, American culture
- Website: JimmyPardo.com

James Ronald Pardo, Jr. is an American stand-up comedian, actor, and host of the comedy podcast Never Not Funny. From the show's inception until mid-2015, he performed as the Conan O'Brien program Conan's warm-up comedian and cast member, after which he received a general development deal with O'Brien's production company. He last hosted the game show Race to Escape on the Science Channel.

== Early life ==
Pardo was born in Chicago, Illinois, and spent his first 8 years living on the South Side, eventually moving to the south suburbs of Chicago. He spent his grade school years living in Hometown, Illinois. In 1980, his family moved to Oak Forest, Illinois, where he attended Oak Forest High School. In 1986, he moved to Pasadena, California, to attend the American Academy of Dramatic Arts (‘87). He attended for one year, then returned to Chicago to pursue a career in stand-up comedy.

== Career ==
In late 1988, Pardo started performing at open mics at various venues around Chicago, including The Roxy, The Last Laugh and The Comedy Cottage. The plethora of successful comedy clubs in the area at that time meant Pardo started earning money almost immediately, allowing him to quit his day job as a sales rep for MCA Records.

In the mid-90s, Pardo performed the role of "Lloyd" in a series of TV commercials for Portland's Lloyd Center mall.

He has hosted such TV shows as Science Channel’s critically acclaimed Race To Escape, National Lampoon’s Funny Money for Game Show Network, five seasons of AMC’s Movies at Our House, with co-host Rachel Quaintance, and episodes of NBC’s Late Friday, VH1’s The Surreal Life, and The Playboy Morning Show.

Pardo was the warm-up comedian for The Tonight Show with Conan O'Brien after being suggested by Andy Richter. He returned as the opening act for Conan, and appeared in a recurring on-air sketch throughout the week of April 11, 2011. In May 2011, he began conducting backstage interviews with celebrity guests for a web series called "The Pardo Patrol."

After doing live talk and game shows at such alternative comedy venues as the Upright Citizens Brigade Theater, Jimmy Pardo began the podcast Never Not Funny in 2006 at the urging of now-producer Matt Belknap. The show is in its thirty-first season and places Pardo among the earliest founders of podcasting. An acknowledged podcasting "pioneer," he has been honored as a "Podfather" by fellow comedian and podcaster Greg Proops. Pardo's show, Never Not Funny, primarily features fellow comedians in improvised conversations. Many of his guests have gone on to host their own podcasts, including Conan O'Brien, Marc Maron, Scott Aukerman, and Sarah Silverman.

In 2012, Pardo hosted a six episode run of the Nerdist web show Write Now! with Jimmy Pardo. Nathan Rabin of The A.V. Club called it "a next-level online roast and a fantastic showcase for its host’s quick wit."

From 2009 to 2024, Pardo hosted an annual 12-hour live telethon charity fundraiser, the Pardcast-A Thon, for Smile Train, an international children's charity to help children with cleft lip and palate. Over fifteen years, the annual telethon event raised almost $2 million.

In 2017, Pardo and Matt Belknap launched an additional podcast, Playing Games with Jimmy Pardo.

In 2019, Pardo, Matt Belknap, and videographer Eliot Hochberg began releasing the web series Jimmy's Records and Tapes on YouTube. Episodes feature Pardo talking about what went on in his life during a particular year while highlighting music and trivia regarding said year.

Pardo has released three comedy albums: Uno (2001), Pompous Clown (2007), and Sprezzatura (2013). He performs with Scott Aukerman on 2008's Never Not Christmas – A Holiday E.P.

== Personal life ==
Pardo is married to comedy writer Danielle Koenig, daughter of the late actor Walter Koenig. They have one son named Oliver.
