= Mark Normand =

American stand-up comedian and actor (born 1983)

- Normand in 2023
- Born: September 18, 1983 (age 43); New Orleans, Louisiana, U.S.
- Education: Louisiana State University; Baton Rouge Community College; Southeastern Louisiana University
- Spouse: Mae Planert (m. 2022)

Comedy career
- Years active: 2006–present
- Medium: Stand-up
- Website: marknormandcomedy.com

Mark Normand (born September 18, 1983) is an American stand-up comedian and actor. He began performing stand-up in his hometown New Orleans in 2006. Normand has performed across the United States and abroad and has appeared on Conan, The Tonight Show Starring Jimmy Fallon and The Late Show with Stephen Colbert.

Normand has been a co-host of a weekly podcast called Tuesdays with Stories with fellow comedian Joe List since 2013. He also co-hosts the weekly podcast We Might be Drunk with friend and fellow comedian Sam Morril.

In March 2026, Normand released his fifth comedy special None Too Pleased on Netflix.

== Early life and education ==
Normand was born in New Orleans, Louisiana, where he attended De La Salle High School. He attended the University of New Orleans before taking a year off to study at the New York Film Academy, though he eventually dropped out.

During a 2023 interview on Neal Brennan's podcast, Normand stated that, before graduating from Southeastern Louisiana University, he attended Louisiana State University and Baton Rouge Community College.

== Career ==
Normand began performing stand-up at Lucy's Retired Surfer Bar in New Orleans in 2006.

Normand regularly performs at comedy clubs and colleges across the country and has performed at numerous festivals, including the Bridgetown Comedy Festival, Seattle International Comedy Competition, Boston Comedy Festival, Melbourne International Comedy Festival and in 2013 was featured as a New Face at Just for Laughs in Montreal.

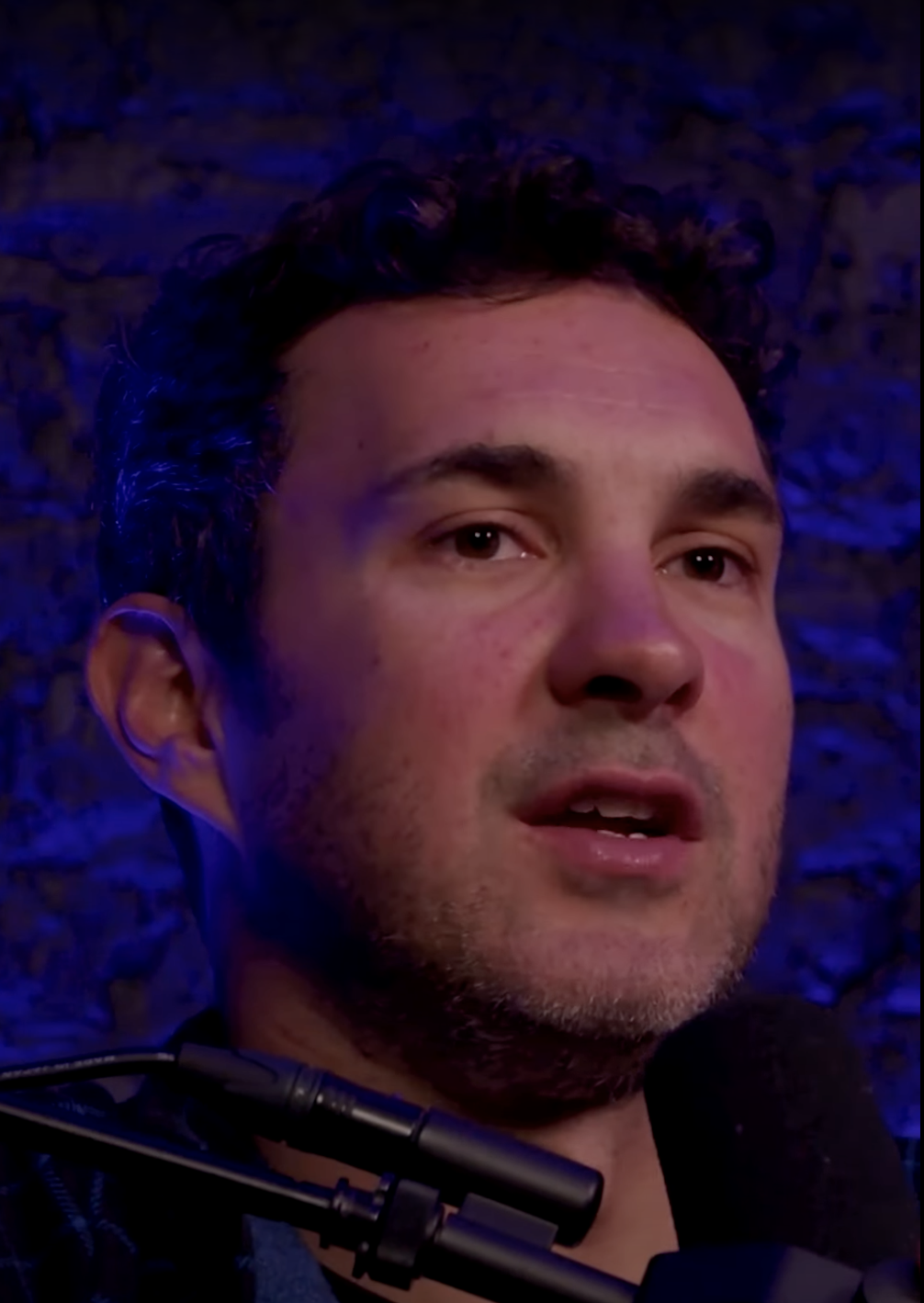
Normand in 2023

His half-hour special on Comedy Central's The Half Hour was released in 2014. He also released an album with Comedy Central Records in 2014 titled Still Got It, which was recorded at Comedy on State in Madison, Wisconsin. Normand's hour-long Comedy Central special Don't Be Yourself was released in 2017. He has appeared on the talk show Conan six times, The Tonight Show Starring Jimmy Fallon, The Late Show with Stephen Colbert, The Late Late Show with James Corden, TruTv, Best Week Ever, MTV, Last Comic Standing and @midnight. He has had acting roles in Inside Amy Schumer and Horace and Pete.

=== Recognition ===
In 2013, Normand won Carolines on Broadway's March Madness competition, beating out 63 other comedians. He was named The Village Voice's "Best Comedian of 2013." In 2012, he appeared on John Oliver's New York Stand-Up Show on Comedy Central, and in 2011 was picked as one of Comedy Central's "Comics to Watch" for the 2011 New York Comedy Festival. Mark was also named Esquire's "Best New Comedians 2012," and Time Out New York's "21 New York Comedy Scene Linchpins."

=== Riyadh Comedy Festival ===
In 2025, Normand participated in the Riyadh Comedy Festival. Joey Shea, Saudi Arabia researcher at Human Rights Watch, said in a statement that the Saudi government is using the comedy festival to whitewash its human rights abuses.

== Personal life ==
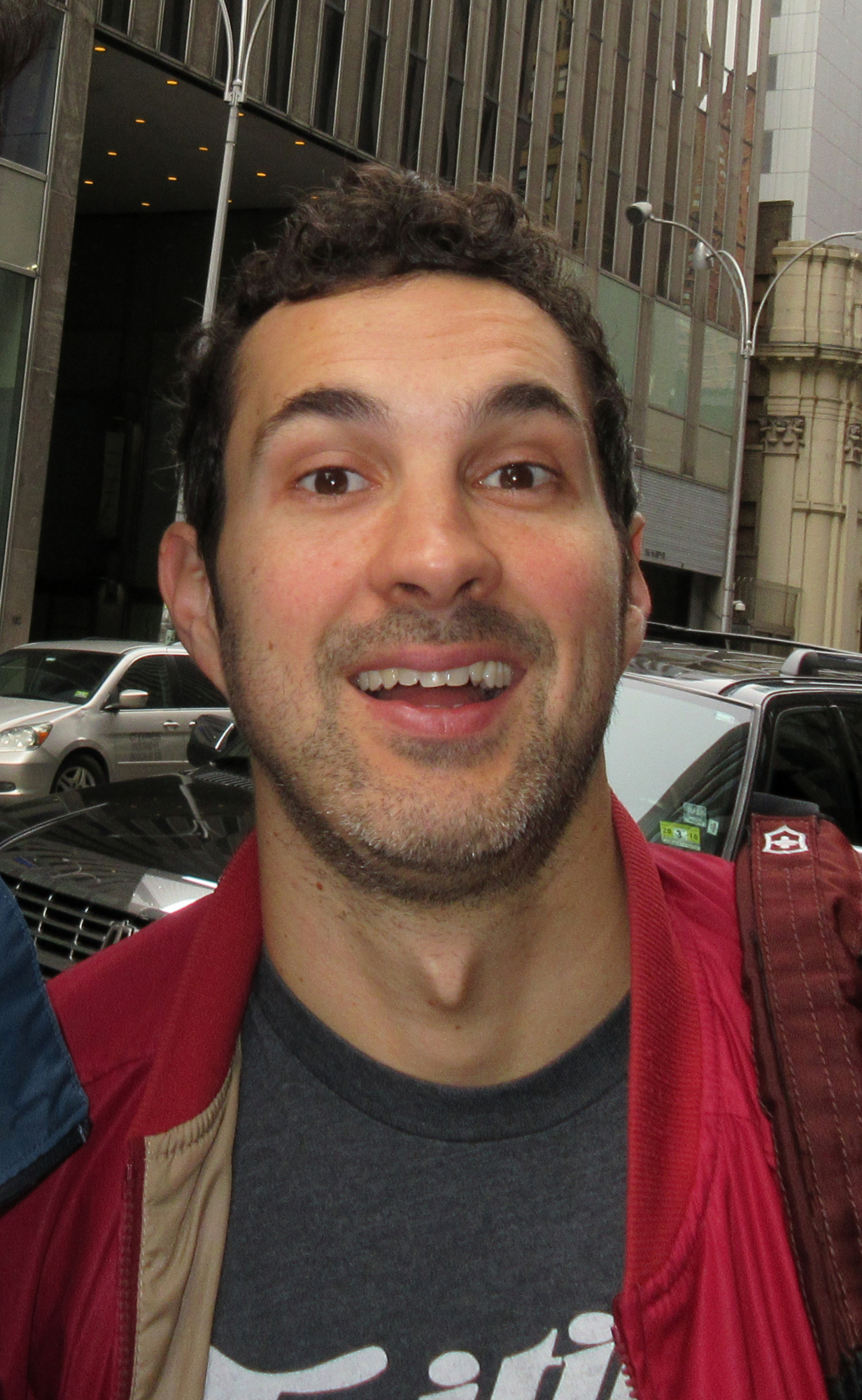
Normand in 2018

Normand lives in the West Village neighborhood of New York City, and has said he is an atheist. He married Mae Planert in November 2022. In January 2025 Normand announced that the couple had welcomed their first child, a baby boy.

== Discography ==
- Still Got It (2014)
- Don't Be Yourself (2017)
- Out to Lunch (2020)
- Soup to Nuts (2023)
- None Too Pleased (2026)

== Filmography ==
Year	Title	Role	Notes
2013, 2015	Inside Amy Schumer	Co-worker, Simon, Dave	3 episodes
2016	Horace and Pete	Mark	2 episodes
