= Sam Morril =

American stand-up comedian and actor (born 1986)

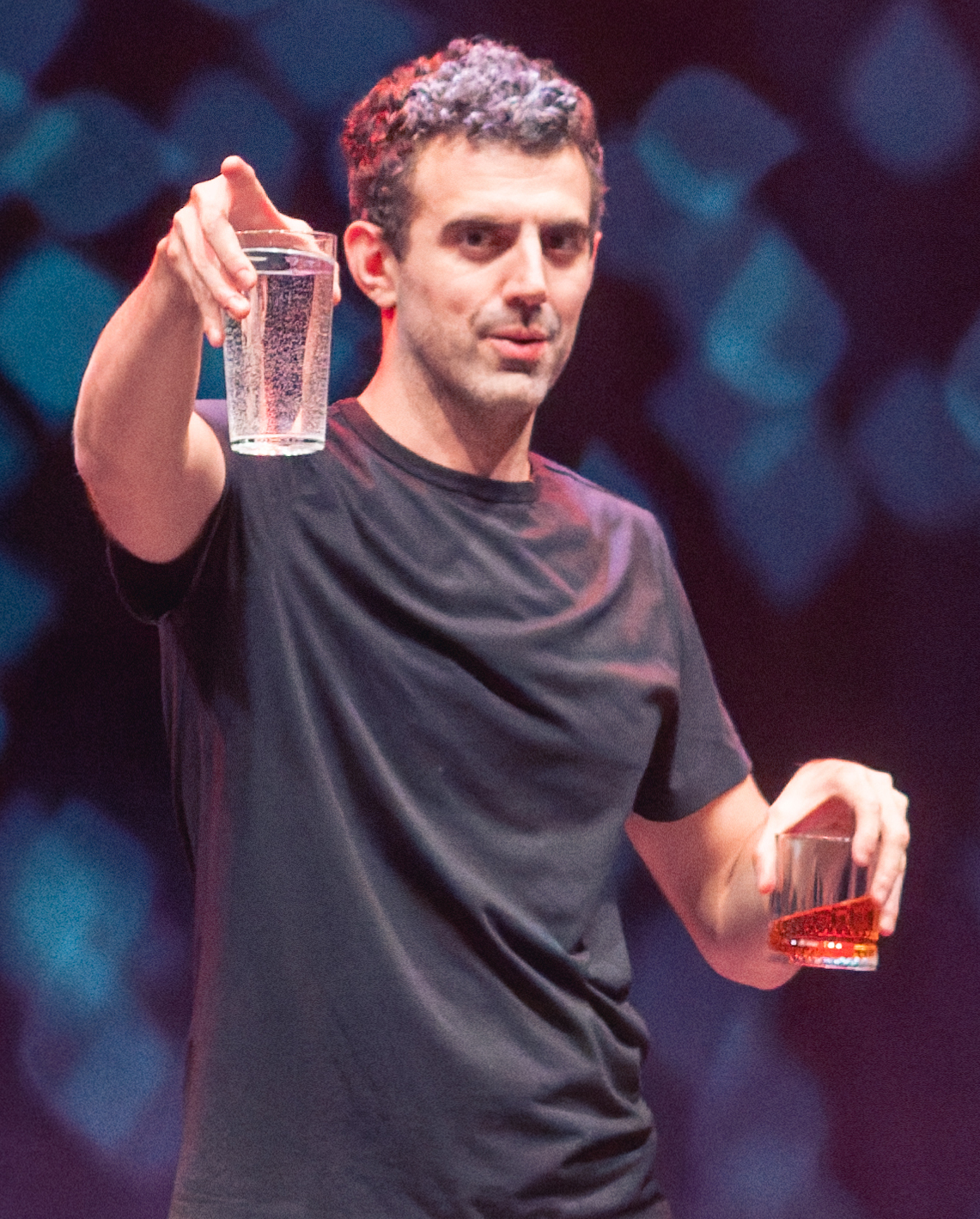
- Morril in 2025
- Born: August 29, 1986 (age 40); New York City, U.S.
- Education: New York University
- Occupation: Stand-up comedian
- Years active: 2005–present
- Relatives: Arthur Elgort (uncle); Ansel Elgort (cousin)
- Website: sammorril.com

Sam Morril (/moʊˈrɪl/ moh-RIL; born August 29, 1986) is an American stand-up comedian. He was named in Comedy Central's "Comics to Watch" in 2011, and went on to feature in numerous specials and sitcoms, namely The Late Show with Stephen Colbert, Conan, and That's My Time with David Letterman. Morril also co-hosts the weekly podcast We Might Be Drunk with fellow comedian Mark Normand.

== Early life ==
Morril was born in Chelsea, Manhattan, New York City. Morril said that according to his 23andMe test, his ancestry is "a lot of Ashkenazi Jew" and "twelve percent" Turkish. Morril was known as Sam Greenberg before his mother married his stepfather, and Morril took his surname. He has two step-siblings. Through his biological father, whose surname is Elgort, Morril is the nephew of fashion photographer Arthur Elgort and the cousin of actor and singer Ansel Elgort. He attended Tulane University in New Orleans before graduating from New York University.

== Career ==
Morril was named one of Comedy Central's "Comics to Watch" in 2011 and has worked with comedians including Dave Attell, Marc Maron, Conan O'Brien, and Amy Schumer. He worked as an intern on The Colbert Report and later appeared on The Late Show with Stephen Colbert in April 2016. He has also made multiple appearances on Conan since 2014. He performed his stand-up routine on America's Got Talent in 2016, but did not win. His first one-hour special, Positive Influence, was released by Comedy Central in September 2018. His second one-hour special, I Got This, was released via Comedy Central's YouTube channel in February 2020. He is a regular on Comedy Central's This Week at the Comedy Cellar, performing frequently when not on tour. He had a cameo appearance as a comedian at an open mic night in the DC thriller film Joker (2019). He appeared on the Netflix series, That's My Time with David Letterman.

In 2025, Morril performed at the Riyadh Comedy Festival, an event which Human Rights Watch characterized as an attempt by the Saudi government to whitewash its human rights abuses.

== Personal life ==
Morril was in a relationship with fellow comedian Taylor Tomlinson from fall 2019 to February 2022, and they started a podcast called This Is Important to Me.

== Filmography ==
=== Comedy specials ===
Year	Title	Platform
2015	Class Act	Comedy Central
2018	Positive Influence	Comedy Central
2020	I Got This	Comedy Central
2020	Up On the Roof	YouTube
2022	Same Time Tomorrow	Netflix
2024	You've Changed	Amazon Prime Video
2026	Incorrect	Netflix

=== Film ===
Year	Title	Role	Notes
2019	Joker	Open Mic Comic	
2021	Full Capacity	Himself	Documentary

=== Television ===
Year	Title	Role	Notes
2014	Stuck on A	Performer	1 episode
2014	Adam DeVine's House Party	Himself	1 episode
2014–2015	Inside Amy Schumer	Beaver / Employee #3	2 episodes
2014–2020	Conan	Himself	6 episodes
2015–2016	Red Eye	Himself	32 episodes
2015	Last Comic Standing		Writer; 1 episode
2015	Adventures in Comedy	Himself	Documentary
2016	America's Got Talent	Himself	1 episode
2016	@midnight with Chris Hardwick	Himself	1 episode
2016	The Late Show with Stephen Colbert	Himself	1 episode
2016	Jeff Ross Presents Roast Battle	Himself	3 episodes
2017	People Talking Sports: And Other Stuff		Writer; 12 episodes
2018	The Tonight Show Starring Jimmy Fallon	Himself	1 episode
2018	Last Call with Carson Daly	Himself	1 episode
2018	This Week at the Comedy Cellar	Himself	3 episodes
2018	The Late Late Show with James Corden	Himself	1 episode
2019	Billions	Sam	Episode: "Fight Night"
2022	Life & Beth	Carny	Season 1, Episode 5

=== Web ===
Year	Title	Role	Notes
2020	Laugh Aid	Himself	Benefit livestream

== Sources ==
- Maron, Marc (April 16, 2020). "Episode 1115 - Sam Morril". WTF with Marc Maron Podcast (Podcast).
