= Nessa =

American television host

- Born: Nessa Diab; Los Angeles, California, U.S.
- Education: University of California, Berkeley (BA)
- Occupations: Television and radio host
- Partner: Colin Kaepernick (2015–present)
- Children: 1

Nessa Diab, known mononymously as Nessa, is an American radio and TV personality and television host.

== Early life and education ==
Nessa was born to Egyptian parents. She has two brothers. She grew up in Southern California but her dad's job frequently moved her family between California and Saudi Arabia. She graduated with a degree in mass communications from the University of California, Berkeley.

== Career ==
While in college, Nessa interned at San Francisco Bay Area Top 40 station Wild 94.9. Eventually, she got her own show, "The Baydestrian Report," which covered news in the Bay Area.

She first rose to prominence for her artist and celebrity interviews on Wild 94.9 and YouTube, which led to MTV seeking her out to be on Girl Code. She has also hosted various MTV and MTV2 shows and currently hosts preshows for the network's MTV Video Music Awards. She currently hosts "Nessa on Air," a successful hip-hop show during the drive time shift on New York City's top rated Hot 97. Her show is the #1 hip hop show in the afternoons with 18–34 year olds and is syndicated nationally in over 15 markets. In 2018, Nessa became the host of NBCUniversal's show, Talk Stoop for one season

== Activism ==
Nessa and Colin Kaepernick founded Know Your Rights Camp, a multi-city traveling youth empowerment initiative for disadvantaged youth. In 2020, the organization expanded its reach with funds for COVID-19 and in June the creation of a legal defense initiative "for victims of excessive force by police terrorism and civil rights violations."

In 2016, she led Plan B One Step's Perfectly Imperfect national campaign with her Girl Code co-host Carly Aquilino, encouraging young women to take charge of their reproductive health.

=== New York City youth organizations ===
She hosts a yearly prom pamper party for underprivileged high school girls from New York City centered around female empowerment. She mentors students from various organizations in New York City, including the Dream Charter School in Harlem and the Bronx, and she created a scholarship and mentorship program in March 2018 at the Lower East Side Girls Club.

== Personal life ==
Diab started dating American civil rights activist and former professional football quarterback Colin Kaepernick in 2015. Their relationship officially went public in February 2016.

She gave birth to their first child, a daughter, in August 2022.

== Hosting credits ==
Year	Title	Notes
2013	Girl Code	Season 1 - Season 4
2013	2013 MTV Woodie Awards	Co-host
2013	Ain't That America	
2013	MTV2 Charlamagne & Friends	
2014	VH1 Big Morning Buzz	
2014	MTVU Woodie Awards	
2014	iHeartRadio Ultimate Pool Party	Guest Appearance
2014	The Real World Aftershow	
2014	Real World: Ex-Plosion Reunion	
2014	MTV2 Jobs That Don't Suck	
2014	Snooki & Jwoww Aftershow	
2014	Teen Mom Aftershow	
2015	Girl Code Live	
2016	The Challenge: Battle of the Bloodlines Reunion	
2016	Real Talk (Aftershow series for Real World: Go Big or Go Home)	
2016	Mucho Mas (Aftershow series for The Challenge: Rivals III)	
2016	The Challenge: Rivals III Reunion	
2016	Real Talk (Aftershow series for Real World Seattle: Bad Blood)	
2017	2017 MTVU Woodie Awards	
2017	Race in America: An MTV Discussion	
2018–2019	Talk Stoop	
2019	Lindsay Lohan's Beach Club	
