= Ain't That America =

- Also known as: Ain't That America with Lil Duval
- Starring: Lil Duval; Chris Distefano (season 1); Carly Aquilino (season 2)
- Country of origin: United States
- No. of seasons: 2
- No. of episodes: 20

Production
- Running time: 22 minutes
- Production companies: Cheri Sundae Productions, MTV

Original release
- Network: MTV2
- Release: July 9, 2013 – April 2, 2014

Ain't That America is an MTV2 video clip show which began airing on July 9, 2013, hosted by Lil Duval. It was co-hosted by Chris Distefano for season one and Carly Aquilino for season two. Ain't That America has been compared to shows like Ridiculousness. The series premiere had 794,000 viewers, making it the second highest rated program in MTV2 history. The series was renewed for a second season, which premiered January 15, 2014.

== Episodes ==
Season One:

- 1 Food & Fitness in America

(Starring Alesha Renee & Jon Gabrus) Aired July 9, 2013

- 2 Parents & Hidden Talents in America

(Starring Draya Michele & James Davis) Aired July 16, 2013

- 3 Working & Vacations in America

(Starring Carly Aquilino & Donnell Rawlings) Aired July 23, 2013

- 4 Drinking & Rides in America

(Starring Carly Aquilino & James Davis) Aired July 30, 2013

- 5 Weddings & Bromance in America

(Starring Damien Lemon & Kelsey Darragh) Aired August 7, 2013

- 6 BBQs & Animals in America

(Starring Nessa & Jordan Carlos) Aired August 13, 2013

- 7 Justice & Style in America

(Starring Nessa & Donnell Rawlings) Aired August 20, 2013

- 8 Sports & Almost Famous in America

(Starring Draya Michele & Jon Gabrus) Aired August 27, 2013

Season Two:

- 9 Vacations & Celebrations in America

(Starring Charlamagne Tha God) Aired January 15, 2014

- 10 Drinking & Rides in America

(Starring Jon Gabrus) Aired January 22, 2014

- 11 College & Dating in America

(Starring Charlemagne tha God & Andrew Schulz) Special Guest: Judah Friedlander Aired January 29, 2014

- 12 Animals & Talent in America

(Starring James Davis) Special Guest: J.R. SmithAired February 5, 2014

- 13 Food & Sports in America

(Starring Jon Gabrus) Aired February 12, 2014

- 14 Bad Ideas & Fandemonium in America

(Starring Andrew Schulz) Special Guest: Waka Flocka Flame Aired February 20, 2014

- 15 Camping & Technology in America

(Starring Jon Gabrus) Aired February 27, 2014

- 16 Fitness & Weddings in America

(Starring Charlemagne tha God) Special Guest: Rosa Acosta Aired March 5, 2014

- 17 Christmas & Pranks in America

(Starring Jon Gabrus) Aired March 12, 2014

- 18 Beauty & Working in America

(Starring James Davis) Aired March 19, 2014

- 19 Dancing & Pets in America

(Starring Andrew Schulz) Aired March 26, 2014

- 20 Parenting & School in America

(Starring James Davis) Aired April 2, 2014

== Guests ==
- Jon Gabrus (Guy Code)
- Donnell Rawlings (Guy Code)
- Damian Lemon (Guy Code)
- Jordan Carlos (Guy Code)
- Kelsey Darragh
- Alesha Renee (Girl Code)
- Nessa (Girl Code)
- James Davis (Wild 'n Out)
- Draya Michele (Basketball Wives LA)
- Charlamagne Tha God (Guy Code)
