= Bupkis =

Bupkis may refer to:

- The word bupkis, a euphemism for "emphatically nothing"
- Bupkis (TV series), 2023 American sitcom
