= Dave Sirus =

American writer and stand-up comedian

Dave Sirus is an American writer and stand-up comedian. He produces and writes sketch comedy, is known for interviewing members of the Westboro Baptist Church, and appeared as a guest and recurring comedic correspondent on RT's The Alyona Show and HuffPost Live. He has been a writer for Saturday Night Live since 2015.

== Career ==
=== Brick Stone ===
Sirus's most well-known character is faux reporter Brick Stone, who became famous for his interviews with members of the Westboro Baptist Church where he ambushes and harasses them with absurd or explicit questions. He interviewed the Westboro Baptist Church in-character as they were protesting the Golden Globes January 12, 2014. A number of former Westboro Baptist Church members who first encountered Stone while he was counter-protesting them would later reach out to Sirus to discuss the church, including Zach Phelps-Roper. He has produced other interview videos as his Brick Stone character with Occupy Wall Street residents, conspiracy theorists, street preachers, gay pride marchers, and the general public.

Sirus ceased performing the Brick Stone character in 2015 largely due to his schedule: he hoped to bring the character back to cover election cycles, but found the material was too similar to his work on Triumph the Insult Comic Dog. He seriously considered reprising Stone for the 2020 United States presidential election but due to the COVID-19 pandemic decided that it was too risky for him to interview Trump supporters.

=== Other activities ===
Sirus is a featured comedian in an episode of nuvoTV's Stand Up and Deliver. In an appearance on the Opie & Anthony show discussing the WBC, Sirus also mentioned his upcoming mockumentary Archie Black: The Worst starring O&A's Jim Norton, Jay Mohr, Artie Lange, Dee Snider, Otto & George, and Rick Overton. The film is premiering at the LA Comedy Fest.

On September 21, 2015, he was hired as a writer for the forty-first season of Saturday Night Live for which he was nominated for an Emmy for Writing in a Variety Series, and won a WGA award for writing in a comedy/variety series. He is also a writer for Triumph the Insult Comic Dog and was a writer and co-producer of The King of Staten Island.

== Personal life ==
Sirus is a long-time friend of comedian Pete Davidson, with whom he worked with on Saturday Night Live. Sirus and Davidson co-wrote the film The King of Staten Island with Judd Apatow. Sirus has occasionally made social media posts on Davidson's behalf, such as in response to the death of Bob Saget, and Kanye West's antagonization over his dating Kim Kardashian.

== Filmography ==
=== Writing ===
| Year | Title | Notes |
|---|---|---|
| 2014 | Archie Black: The Worst | Documentary |
| 2015-2022 | Saturday Night Live | 30 episodes |
| 2016 | Triumph's Election Watch 2016 | 5 episodes |
| 2020 | The King of Staten Island | Co-writer; also co-producer |
| 2020-2021 | Let's Be Real | 5 episodes |
| 2023 | Bupkis | 8 episodes |
