= The King of Staten Island =

2020 film by Judd Apatow

- Release poster
- Directed by: Judd Apatow
- Written by: Judd Apatow; Pete Davidson; Dave Sirus
- Produced by: Judd Apatow; Barry Mendel
- Starring: Pete Davidson; Marisa Tomei; Bill Burr; Bel Powley; Maude Apatow; Steve Buscemi
- Cinematography: Robert Elswit
- Edited by: Jay Cassidy; William Kerr; Brian Scott Olds
- Music by: Michael Andrews
- Production companies: Universal Pictures; Apatow Productions; Perfect World Pictures
- Distributed by: Universal Pictures Home Entertainment
- Release date: June 12, 2020
- Running time: 137 minutes
- Country: United States
- Language: English
- Budget: $35 million
- Box office: $2.2 million

The King of Staten Island is a 2020 American black comedy-drama film produced and directed by Judd Apatow, from a screenplay he wrote with Pete Davidson and Dave Sirus. It stars Davidson, Marisa Tomei, Bill Burr, Bel Powley, Maude Apatow, and Steve Buscemi, and follows a young man who must get his life together after his mother starts dating a new man who, like his deceased father, is a firefighter.

The film was announced as Apatow's next project in early 2019, with the cast joining that April. Filming took place around New York City in June and July. The film has been called a "semi-biographical" take on the life of Davidson, whose father was a New York City firefighter who died in service during the September 11 attacks and who has had his own battles with mental illness.

Originally intended to be released theatrically in the United States, the film was released on premium video on demand (PVOD) on June 12, 2020, by Universal Pictures. It received generally positive reviews from critics.

== Plot ==
Twenty-four-year-old high school dropout Scott Carlin lives with his mother Margie and his sister Claire in Staten Island. His firefighter father Stan died fighting a fire when he was seven, a loss that continues to affect him; he also deals with numerous medical problems, including Crohn's disease and ADD, and smokes marijuana often.

Unemployed, Scott spends his days hanging out with his friends, including Kelsey, whom he is sleeping with. She wants the relationship to be more serious, but he fears commitment and that he is not good enough for her. Claire, who is leaving for college, is concerned Scott's neuroses may grow out of control with her gone.

Scott dreams of being a tattoo artist and practices regularly on his friends, although his work is extremely inconsistent. One day, while hanging out with them at the beach, he is approached by 9-year-old Harold. Harold asks Scott to give him a tattoo, but runs off after getting a single line. Later, Harold's father, Ray, shows up at Scott's house.

Initially furious, Ray finds himself attracted to Margie and he eventually asks her out. Though she has not dated since Stan's death, she agrees. As things get more serious, Margie reveals their relationship to Scott, who is disturbed that he, like Stan, is a firefighter. Ray takes Scott to a Staten Island Yankees game with his co-workers but finds it difficult to talk to Scott, who argues that firefighters should not have families because of the pain that is caused by their deaths.

Margie and Ray give Scott an ultimatum to move out, which upsets him. While visiting Claire, he tells her he plans to break up their mom and Ray, as the relationship is 'unhealthy'. Scott gets a job as a busboy, and begins walking Harold and his sister Kelly to school each day, growing close with them.

Meanwhile, Scott's friends plan to rob a pharmacy for oxycodone pills to sell. He is uncomfortable with the plan but agrees to be the lookout. The robbery goes awry when the pharmacist and his wife confront them. Oscar is shot and all three are arrested, but Scott flees.

Scott talks with Ray's ex-wife Gina, who tells him several negative things about Ray, painting him as a homeless gambling addict. He relays this to Margie, only to end up in a physical confrontation with Ray when he hears what Scott told her. A furious Margie kicks both men out.

With his friends in jail, Scott struggles to find a place to stay. He hopes that Kelsey will let him stay with her after they sleep together, but she is indignant when she recognizes his ulterior motives and refuses. Desperate, Scott goes to Ray's firehouse, where he is told he may stay in return for doing chores.

Scott gradually bonds with Ray and the other firefighters, who tell him stories about his father, which humanizes him and helps Scott accept his death. Ray learns from Harold that Scott is a talented artist, and agrees to let him tattoo his back as practice, but within certain limits.

One day, a man shows up at the firehouse with an abdominal wound while Scott is there alone. He takes him to the hospital, where Ray arrives, using his firefighter connections to get the man the help he needs. Margie, who works as an emergency room nurse, sees Scott and Ray and reconciles with them both.

Ray shows Margie his tattoos; a number of them are offensive or violate his criteria, but the most prominent is one of Margie, Ray, Scott, and Claire together (plus their dad as the sun). Scott surprises Kelsey at the Staten Island Ferry, where she is heading into Manhattan to take a civil service exam. He rides on the ferry with her, where he confesses his love for her, and they kiss. Kelsey heads into the exam, asking him to wait for her.

== Cast ==
- Pete Davidson as Scott Carlin, an aspiring tattoo artist
- Marisa Tomei as Marjorie "Margie" Carlin, an ER nurse and Scott's mother
- Bill Burr as Ray Bishop, a firefighter
- Bel Powley as Kelsey, Scott's on and off girlfriend
- Maude Apatow as Claire Carlin, a college student and Scott's sister
- Steve Buscemi as Papa, a firefighter
- Ricky Velez as Oscar, friend of Scott
- Pamela Adlon as Gina, Ray's ex-wife
- Jimmy Tatro as Firefighter Savage
- Kevin Corrigan as Joe, Scott's boss at the restaurant
- Domenick Lombardozzi as Firefighter Lockwood
- Mike Vecchione as Firefighter Thompson
- Moisés Arias as Igor, friend of Scott
- Carly Aquilino as Tara
- Lou Wilson as Richie, friend of Scott
- Derek Gaines as Zoots
- Pauline Chalamet as Joanne, Claire's best friend
- Colson Baker as Tattoo Shop Owner
- Mario Polit as Rivera
- Luke David Blumm as Harold Bishop, Ray's son
- Colton Morrow-Merrill as Scooter
- Robert Smigel as Alan Moskowitz
- Action Bronson as Shot or Stabbed Victim
- Keith Robinson as Security Guard
- Rich Vos as Restaurant Husband
- Anthony Lee Medina as Kelsey's Tinder Date
- Bonnie McFarlane as Restaurant Wife

== Production ==
On January 29, 2019, it was announced that Universal Pictures was producing a new film directed by Judd Apatow and starring Pete Davidson. The film was set to be written by Apatow, Davidson, and Dave Sirus with Apatow and Sirus also producing the film. Davidson first came to Apatow's attention while working on Trainwreck after he was recommended by Amy Schumer, and he was cast in a cameo role in that film. The story is based in part on Davidson's life, depicting what it might have been like if he had not become a comedian.

In April 2019, Bel Powley, Bill Burr and Marisa Tomei were added to the cast. Maude Apatow and Pamela Adlon joined in May. In June 2019, Colson Baker, Jimmy Tatro, Ricky Velez, Steve Buscemi, Kevin Corrigan, Domenick Lombardozzi, Mike Vecchione, Moisés Arias, Lou Wilson and Derek Gaines joined the cast of the film.

Principal photography began June 3, 2019, in Staten Island and concluded on August 9.

== Release ==
The King of Staten Island was set to have its world premiere at South by Southwest on March 13, 2020. However, due to the COVID-19 pandemic, the festival was cancelled. It was later rescheduled to premiere at the Tribeca Film Festival on April 20, 2020, which was also cancelled due to the pandemic. Originally scheduled for a theatrical release on June 19, 2020, but due to movie theaters closures that started in mid-March because of the pandemic restrictions, the film was instead released digitally in the United States and Canada on premium video on demand (PVOD) on June 12, 2020. It was initially set to play in about 100 theaters, mostly drive-ins, beginning the same day as its VOD release, but Universal Pictures changed course after consulting the film's producers.

The film was released in cinemas in the Netherlands on June 25, 2020, France on July 22, Germany on July 30, and Spain on October 9. The film made $253,000 from 160 theaters in its Australian debut and $59,000 in New Zealand.

As of March 27, 2022, the film had earned an estimated $4.5 million in theatrical and home markets, as well as an estimated $40 million in video-on-demand sales across various platforms.

== Reception ==
=== VOD sales ===
In its debut weekend, The King of Staten Island was the most rented film on FandangoNow, Amazon Prime, the iTunes Store, Comcast Xfinity, Apple TV, Vudu, Google Play, YouTube, Spectrum, and DirecTV. It remained the top rented film across all platforms in second weekend, then on all but FandangoNow in its third. After a month of release, the film remained the number-one rented title on Prime, and in the top-five on all other platforms. In late-August, the price was lowered to $5.99 and it returned to the second-most rented movie on Fandango and third on Apple TV. In October 2020, The Hollywood Reporter said the film had generated $40 million in revenue for Universal up to that point. They also reported the film was the seventh-most popular PVOD title amid the COVID-19 pandemic.

=== Critical response ===
On review aggregator website Rotten Tomatoes, the film holds an approval rating of 75% based on 287 reviews, with an average rating of 6.9/10. The site's critics consensus reads: "The King of Staten Island's uncertain tone and indulgent length blunt this coming-of-age dramedy's ability to find itself, but Pete Davidson's soulful performance holds it together." On Metacritic, the film has a weighted average score of 67 out of 100, based on 50 critics, indicating "generally favorable" reviews.

Writing for the Chicago Sun-Times, Richard Roeper called the film "sharp and funny" and gave it three-and-a-half stars out of four, saying that "Davidson delivers a fully realized, nuanced performance, tackling dark comedy and raw drama with equal aplomb." David Ehrlich of IndieWire gave the film a "B+" and called it "a sweet and tender dramedy", writing: "Teetering between self-parody and something truly beautiful, Apatow's latest offers yet another shaggy portrait of permanent adolescence but this one — his best film since 2009's Funny People — helps make sense of why he always keeps going back to the same archetype."
