= New Year's Eve Live (disambiguation) =

New Year's Eve Live refers to the annual New Year's Eve television special broadcast by CNN since 2001.

New Year's Eve Live may refer to the following:

- New Year's Eve Live (Fox TV program), the New Year's Eve specials broadcast by Fox TV network from 1991 to 1992, and again from 2004 to 2013
- MTV New Year's Eve Live, an alternate name for MTV's New Year's Eve specials broadcast between 1981 and 2014
