= MTV New Year's Eve specials =

- Starring: Various hosts and performers
- Country of origin: United States

Production
- Running time: Late night: Typically 60 minutes (11:00 p.m. – 12:00 a.m) or more

Original release
- Network: MTV
- Release: December 31, 1981 – December 31, 2014

From 1981 through 2014, MTV aired New Year's Eve specials. The special was first held in 1981 as MTV's New Year's Eve Rock N' Roll Ball, which featured a concert from the Hotel Diplomat in mid-Manhattan featuring Bow Wow Wow, Karla DeVito, and David Johansen (a photo of which was used as the cover art for his subsequent live album Live It Up). For its early editions, the Rock N' Roll Ball was hosted by MTV VJs; the 1986–87 edition would instead be hosted by Joe Piscopo and carry an Ancient Rome theme.

Later specials were typically broadcast from MTV's One Astor Plaza studios in Times Square, covering the nearby ball drop. They would initially be hosted by Carson Daly of Total Request Live until his departure to NBC (where he would go on to host New Year's Eve with Carson Daly).

During the late 1990s, 2000s, and part of the early 2010s, the special was heavily promoted and featured top musical acts and celebrities. By its final years, the specials had been downsized in comparison. The network decided not to carry a special at the end of 2015 leading into 2016, choosing to carry a marathon of the viral clip series Ridiculousness instead, and the cold opening of the winter premiere of Teen Wolf at midnight; the network and parent company Viacom in general went through a number of staff and budget cutbacks in 2015 due to declining ratings.

== Editions ==
- 1981–82: MTV's New Year's Eve Rock N' Roll Ball
- 1982–83: MTV's Second Annual New Year's Eve Rock N' Roll Ball
- 1983–84: MTV's 3rd Annual New Year's Eve Rock N' Roll Ball
- 1984–85: MTV's 4th Annual New Year's Eve Rock N' Roll Ball
- 1985–86: MTV's 5th Annual New Year's Eve Rock N' Roll Ball
- 1986–87: Nero's Eve Rock N' Roll Ball, with performers Andy Taylor, Beastie Boys, Dave Edmunds, Lone Justice, and The Georgia Satellites. The network also announced the winner of a contest awarding a nearly $400,000 prize package during the special, which notably included 100 acres of unincorporated land near Wheeler, Texas (dubbed "MTV Town", with a "general store" including a supply of products from sponsor Nabisco).
- 1987-88: MTV's Subway to L.A.
- 1988–89: MTV's Big Bang '89
- 1989–90: MTV's Dawn of the Decade House Party
- 1990–91: MTV's New Year's Eve World Party: with performers Bon Jovi and Skid Row from the Tokyo Dome, Scorpions from Deutschlandhalle in Berlin, and The Black Crows, Cinderella, and Vanilla Ice from The Ritz in New York City.
- 1991–92: MTV '92
- 1992–93: MTV Drops the Ball '93
- 1993–94: Janet's Live New Year Jam: a half-hour special featuring live performances by Janet Jackson from her concert at Madison Square Garden, followed by coverage of the ball drop in Times Square. The special was preceded by MTV's Live and Loud, a Nirvana concert special filmed at Pier 48 in Seattle. In 2013, Nirvana would release an uncut recording of the full performance on DVD to mark the 20th anniversary of their final album In Utero.
- 1997-98: MTV Live From Times Square
- 1998–99: MTV New Year's Eve Live. Hosts: Carson Daly and Jennifer Love Hewitt. Performers: Green Day, Method Man, Limp Bizkit (With Everlast during "Jump Around"). House DJ: Kid Rock. Guests: Aaliyah, Katie Holmes, 98°. Correspondents: Ananda Lewis, Jesse Camp, Dave Holmes.
- 1999–2000: MTV 2|Large Millennium Countdown. Hosts: Carson Daly, Christina Aguilera, Kathy Griffin. Correspondents: DJ Skribble, Tyrese, Chris Connelly, Kurt Loder, Dave Holmes. Performers: Blink-182, No Doubt, Bush, 98°, Goo Goo Dolls, Christina Aguilera. DJ: Mark Ronson.
- 2000–01: New Year's Eve 2001
- 2001–02: NYE 02
- 2002–03: New Year Pajama Party
- 2003–04: MTV's New Year's Eve 2004
- 2004–05: Iced Out – New Year's Eve 2005
- 2005–06: New Year of Music
- 2006–07: MTV Goes Gold – New Year's Eve 2007
- 2007–08: Tila Tequila's MTV New Year's Eve Masquerade 2008. Co-hosts: Damien Fahey, Lyndsey Rodrigues. Performers: Mary J. Blige, Kid Rock, Fabolous, Paramore, Good Charlotte, Wyclef Jean, Boys Like Girls, Flo Rida. House DJ: Travie McCoy. Guests: Cast members of A Shot at Love with Tila Tequila, Perez Hilton.
- 2008–09: FNMTV Presents: A Miley-Sized Surprise
  - Host Miley Cyrus and Metro Station performed from Arnold O. Beckman High School in Irvine, California; Cyrus surprised a Beckman student nominated for her work to "better the lives of others" in 2008 via contributions to the school's breast cancer awareness campaign. The Veronicas, Adrienne Bailon, and Lil Mama hosted from Times Square, with performers All Time Low, The Academy Is... and Kevin Rudolf.
- 2009–10: MTV News Presents: Top 9 of '09 – Host Adrienne Bailon and the cast of Jersey Shore. Guests: Cast of The Buried Life, Shailene Woodley, and Josie Loren. Produced by MTV News from the small Downtown studio portion of MTV Studios and outside in Times Square covering the nine biggest stories of 2009.
- 2010–11: MTV New Year's Bash 2011. Host: Whitney Cummings. Guests: Cast of Jersey Shore. Pre-taped ball drop with Snooki inside from Seaside Heights. Correspondents: Kevin Manno and Julie Alexandria. Performers: Flo Rida. Guests: Ashley Benson, Shay Mitchell. Pre-taped segments from Bobby Moynihan, Nick Kroll, and Keenan Cahill.
- 2011–12: MTV NYE In NYC 2012 – Hosts: Demi Lovato and Tyler Posey. Performers: Demi Lovato, Selena Gomez & the Scene, Jason Derulo, Mac Miller and J. Cole.
- 2012–13: MTV's Club NYE 2013 – Hosts Snooki, JWoww, Jeff Dye. Performers: Ke$ha, Ne-Yo, Sean Kingston, Rita Ora and Conor Maynard. Guests: Tyler Blackburn, Keegan Allen, choreographer Binkie, Nikki Glaser and Sara Schaefer. House DJ: The Knocks
- 2013–14 Girl Code Presents: New Year's Code—Special episode of Girl Code at 10pm ET. Hosts: live hosting in Times Square from Carly Aquilino and Charlamagne Tha God during the episode and for the hour after. Guests: Cast of Vampire Acacdemy (Zoey Deutch, Cameron Monaghan, and Dominic Sherwood).
- 2014–15: MTV's New Year's Eve 2015 – Hosts Victoria Justice and Charlamagne. New filmed segments with Girl Code and Guy Code comedians, including Carly Aquilino, Andrew Schulz and Damien Lemon.
