= Chris Distefano =

American comedian

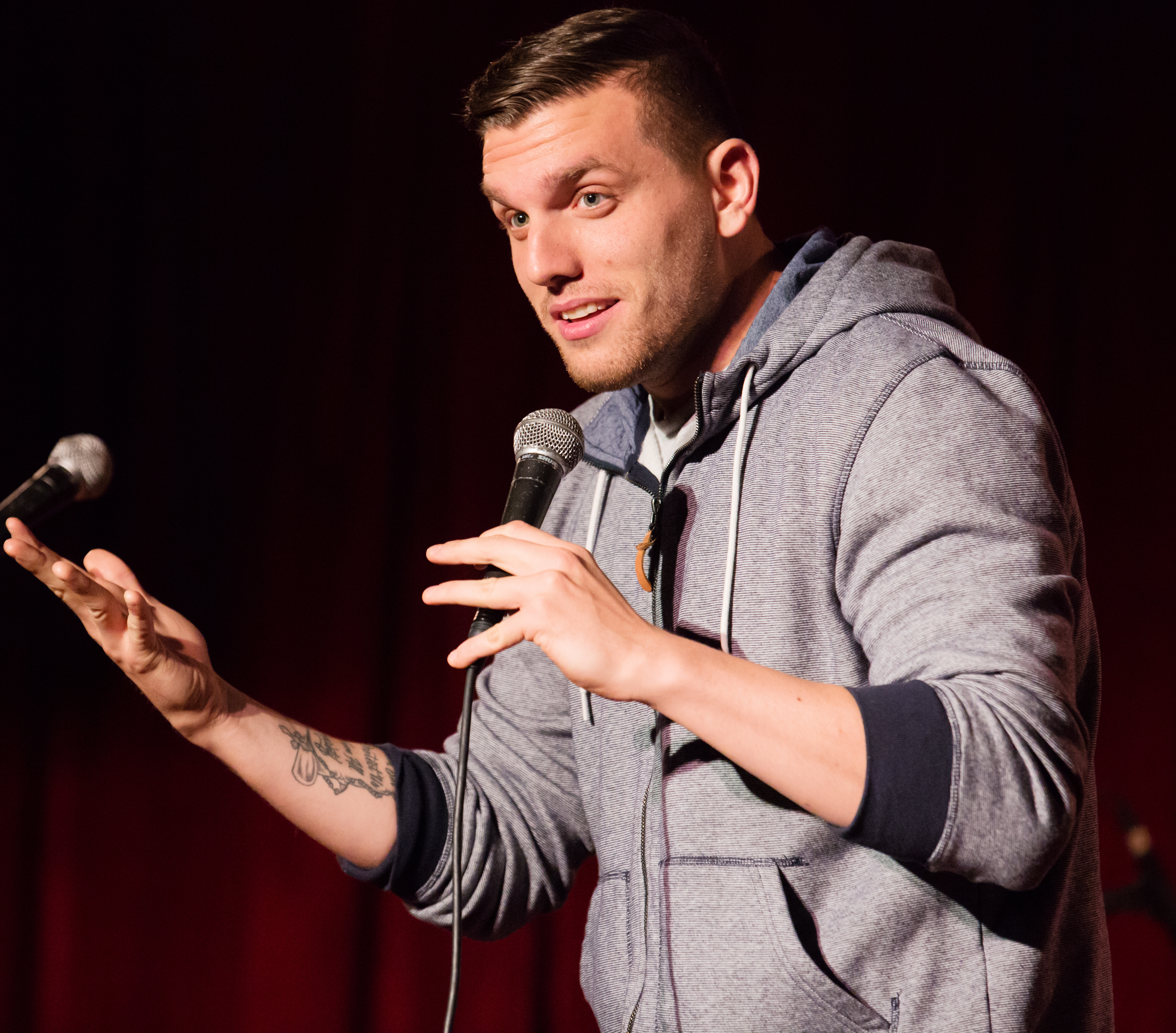
- Distefano in 2014
- Born: Christopher Paul Anthony Distefano; August 26, 1984 (age 42); Brooklyn, New York, U.S.
- Other name: Chrissy D
- Education: St. Joseph's College (BA); New York Institute of Technology (DPT)
- Notable work: Guy Code; Girl Code; Hey Babe! History Hyenas; Chris Distefano Presents: Chrissy Chaos
- Partner: Jasmine Canuelas (2015–present)
- Children: 3

Comedy career
- Years active: 2009–present
- Medium: Stand-up; podcast; television
- Genre: Observational comedy
- Website: Official website

Christopher Paul Anthony Distefano (born August 26, 1984) is an American comedian. Primarily a stand-up comedian, he began his career in entertainment on MTV and MTV2's shows Guy Code and Girl Code. His first hour-long standup special, Chris Distefano: Size 38 Waist, was released in 2019 by Comedy Central. His second special, Speshy Weshy, premiered on Netflix in May 2022. Distefano co-hosts Hey Babe! podcast with Sal Vulcano from Impractical Jokers and hosts several podcasts, Chrissy Chaos and co-hosts ‘History Hyenas’ with comedian Yannis Pappas.

== Early life ==
Distefano, who is of mostly German descent (he has some Italian and Irish ancestry), grew up in the Ridgewood neighborhood of Queens and attended Archbishop Molloy High School in the Briarwood area of Queens . He went to St. Joseph's College where he played basketball and studied psychology; he graduated in 2006. Distefano was recruited to play for St. Joseph's College Brooklyn's D-III basketball team in 2002. He was the team's lead scorer, and was inducted into the college's Hall of Fame in 2018.

Distefano earned a doctorate in physical therapy from New York Institute of Technology in Manhattan, New York in 2010. He was a pediatric physical therapist until 2013 when he began pursuing his career in comedy full-time.

== Career ==
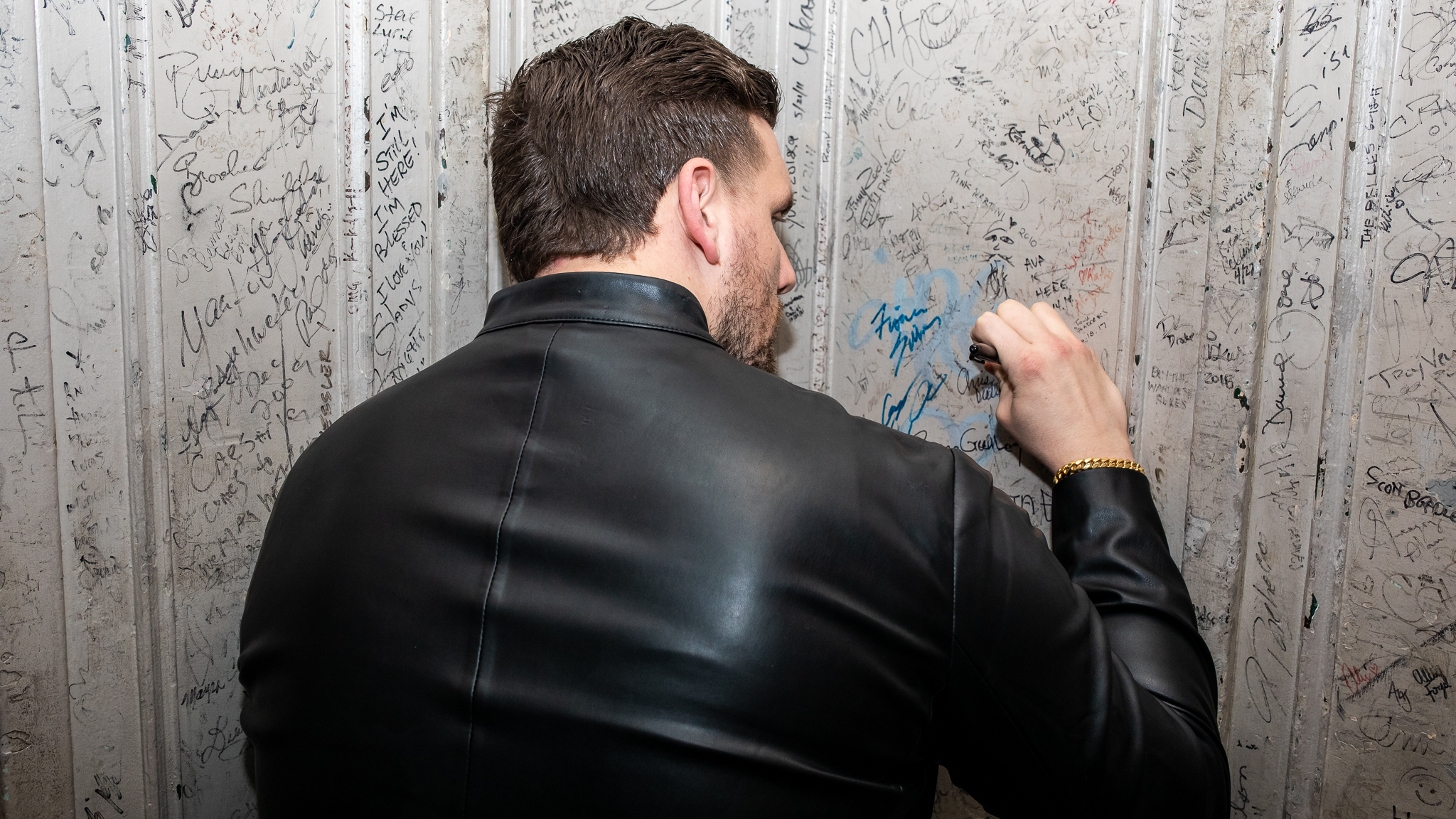
Distefano signs the Beacon Theatre's famous elevator before performing a sold-out show on February 5, 2022

Distefano began performing stand-up in August 2009. He hosted the 2010 Fencing Masters on the SNY network and Elite 8 of the 2011 and 2012 March Madness comedy competitions at the comedy club Carolines on Broadway. He headlined Carolines Breakout Artist Series and was selected as a finalist in the 2011 NY Comedy Festival. He also performed standup at venues including New York Comedy Club, Comedy Cellar, Gotham Comedy Club, Broadway Comedy Club, and the Laugh Lounge.

In 2012, Distefano joined the cast MTV's Guy Code, which was in its second season. In 2013, he joined the cast of Girl Code. He appeared in episodes of other MTV shows including Guy Court, Guy Code vs. Girl Code, Off the Bat, and The Challenge. He was a frequent guest on the Opie with Jim Norton show during that time. Distefano performed on the Late Show with David Letterman in June 2013. In 2014, his first half-hour special was released as part of Comedy Central's The Half Hour.

After appearing on Late Night with Seth Meyers, Distefano began his first national U.S. tour in September 2015 with Monster Energy Outbreak Presents. He co-starred in the 2015 IFC series Benders with Andrew Schulz. He was one of two announcers on Season 2 of Netflix's Ultimate Beastmaster, which debuted on the streaming service on December 15, 2017.

Distefano was in seven television pilots which did not get picked up, including a CBS-produced show based on his own life called Distefano. He co-starred in the web series Bay Ridge Boys alongside fellow comic Yannis Pappas, with whom he co-hosted the weekly history podcast History Hyenas, which was launched in February 2018. Distefano regularly performs and tours globally. In January 2019, his first hour standup special Chris Distefano: Size 38 Waist premiered on Comedy Central, which included a personal welcome on stage by Chazz Palminteri. The special was part of a deal he made with Comedy Central in December 2018, which included the series Stupid Questions with Chris Distefano, and at least two series in development. That also included his weekly podcast Stand-Up with Chris Distefano, launched in April 2019.

In February 2022, Distefano sold out his first performance at Beacon Theatre in Manhattan. He then sold out his first two shows at the Gramercy Theatre a month later, during the shows he recorded his second special, Speshy Weshy.

Distefano, an avid sports fan, has hosted episodes of shows including MLB's Off The Bat and MSG's The Brackets. He was invited by the New York Mets to throw the first game pitch in 2021, and he set off the Vegas Golden Knights' pre-game siren alongside friend and fellow comedian Andrew Santino in March 2022. In early April, Distefano was featured on The Pat McAfee Show, hosted by Pat McAfee.

In 2025, Distefano participated in Saudi Arabia's Riyadh Comedy Festival, an event which Human Rights Watch characterized as an attempt by the Saudi government to whitewash its human rights abuses. He expressed hesitation in his decision in two podcast appearances released in the summer of 2025, but ultimately chose to go, indicating that his recent purchase of a house was a deciding factor.

== Personal life ==
Distefano dated comedian Carly Aquilino from 2010 to 2014. Distefano has two children and a stepson with Jasmin Canuelas, whom he has been dating since 2015. They were married on June 21, 2026.Instagram live on Staten Island. On a 2026 podcast Distefano stated that he had become a fan of Sunderland AFC.

== Filmography ==
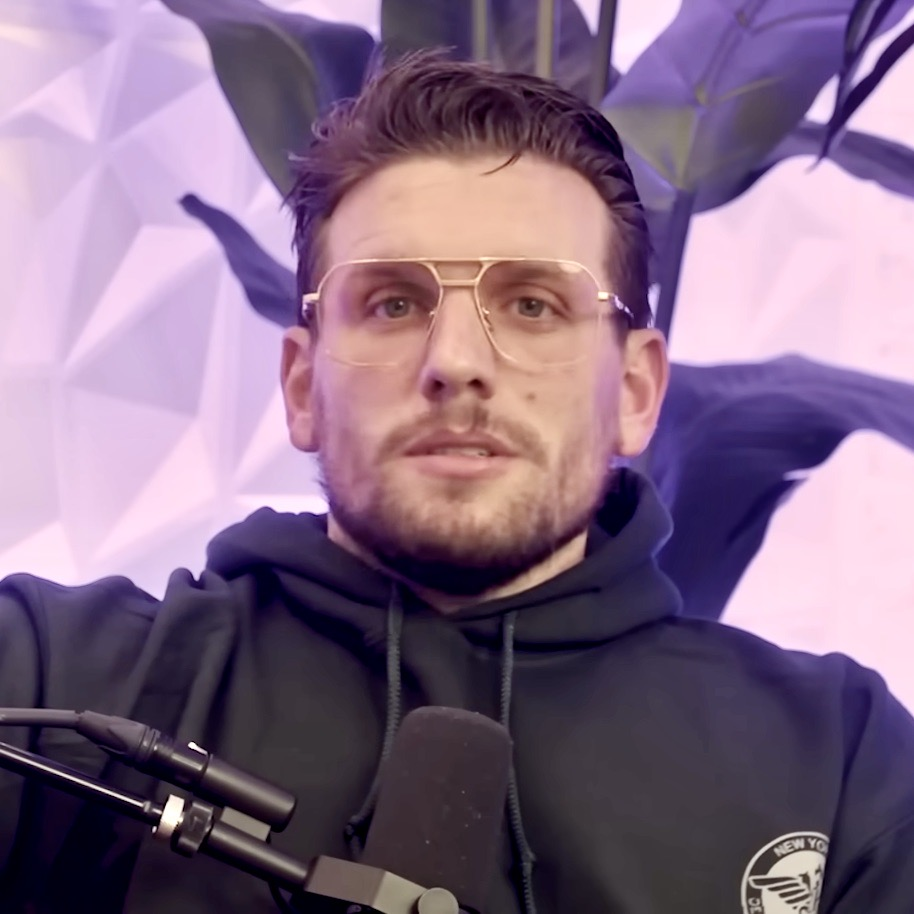
Distefano on The Blocks w/ Neal Brennan in 2023

=== Television ===
Year	Title	Role	Notes
2012–15	Guy Code	Himself	From season 2 on
2012–15	Girl Code	Himself	
2013	Guy Code Honors	Himself	TV special from 2013 Comic-Con
2013	Ain't That America	Himself	Co-host alongside Lil Duval.
2013	Charlemagne & Friends	Himself	VMA pre-party on MTV
2013	Guy Court	Himself	
2013	The Bracket	Himself	Co-host alongside Yannis Pappas
2014	Off The Bat From The MLB Fan Cave	Himself	Co-host alongside Melanie Iglesias
2015	Benders	Anthony Pucello	8 episodes
2017	Ultimate Beastmaster	Himself	Co-host alongside Tiki Barber (season 2)
2017	Distefano	Chris	Unaired CBS pilot
2021	Backyard Bar Wars	Himself	Host
2023	Super Maximum Retro Show	Himself	Host

=== Film ===
Year	Title	Role
2019	Ode to Joy	Staten Island Meathead

== Discography ==
Comedy specials

- Size 38 Waist (2019)
- Speshy Weshy (2022)
- It's Just Unfortunate (2025)

Podcasts

- History Hyenas with Yannis Pappas (2018–2021, 2024-present)
- Stand-Up with Chris Distefano (2019)
- Hey Babe! with Sal Vulcano (2020–2024)
- Chrissy Chaos (2021–present)
- Teach Me Daddy with Matteo Lane (2024)
