= Super Maximum Retro Show =

- Presented by: Chris Distefano
- Country of origin: United States
- Original language: English
- No. of seasons: 1

Production
- Executive producer: Jimmy Kimmel

Original release
- Network: Vice TV

Super Maximum Retro Show is a 2023 Vice Media series.

Jimmy Kimmel is the series executive producer.
