= Bupkis (TV series) =

American television series

- Genre: Comedy drama
- Written by: Pete Davidson; Judah Miller; Dave Sirus
- Starring: Pete Davidson; Edie Falco; Joe Pesci
- Country of origin: United States
- Original language: English
- No. of seasons: 1
- No. of episodes: 8

Production
- Executive producers: Pete Davidson; Judah Miller; Dave Sirus; Lorne Michaels; Andrew Singer; Erin David
- Production companies: Broadway Video; Untitled Judah Miller; King for a Night Productions; Universal Television

Original release
- Network: Peacock
- Release: May 4, 2023

Bupkis is an American comedy drama television series created by and starring Pete Davidson. It premiered on Peacock on May 4, 2023.

In June 2023, the series was renewed for a second season. However, Davidson announced in March 2024 that he had chosen to not move forward with the second season.

== Premise ==
The show is described as a "heightened fictionalized version of Pete Davidson's life", and has been compared to Louis C.K.'s Louie and Larry David's Curb Your Enthusiasm.

== Cast ==
=== Main ===
- Pete Davidson as himself
- Edie Falco as Amy Davidson
- Joe Pesci as Joe LaRocca

=== Recurring ===
- Philip Ettinger as Evan, Pete's friend and manager
- Derek Gaines as Derek
- James Crillz DeSimone as Crillz
- Bobby Cannavale as Uncle Tommy
- Brad Garrett as "Uncle" Roy
- Shane Gillis as Gilly
- Dave Sirus as Dave
- Marissa Jaret Winokur as Lori
- Oona Roche as Casey Davidson, Pete's sister
- Chase Sui Wonders as Nikki, Pete's girlfriend

=== Guest ===
- Charlie Day as Dr. Rossi
- Kenan Thompson as Referee/Barista
- Sebastian Stan as himself
- Rob O’Malley as Devon Leech
- Steve Buscemi as Father Mac
- Method Man as a man pretending to be a carny
- Jon Stewart as himself
- Al Gore as himself
- Cam'ron as himself
- J. J. Abrams as himself
- Paul Walter Hauser as Hauser
- Jane Curtin as Marie LaRocca
- Machine Gun Kelly as himself
- Delaney Quinn as Anna
- Jordan Rock as a rehab orderly
- Chris O'Donnell as Pete's Agent
- La La Anthony as Lisa
- John Mulaney as himself
- Simon Rex as Crispy
- John Pollono as Michael
- Ricky Velez as a rehab orderly
- Carly Aquilino as herself
- Dave Attell as Park Guest
- Nathan Fillion as Gunslinger
- Kevin Corrigan as Bartender
- Giulio Gallarotti as Giulio
- Lynne Koplitz as Donna
- Stacy Keach as legal disclaimer narrator
- Jadakiss as himself
- Eli Manning as himself
- Charlamagne tha God as Priest
- Sunita Mani as Monica
- Ray Romano as Himself
- David Howard Thornton as Art the Clown

== Episodes ==
No.	Title	Directed by	Written by	Original release date
1	"Magic Moment"	Jason Orley	Judah Miller & Pete Davidson & Dave Sirus	May 4, 2023 (Peacock); June 4, 2023 (NBC)
Pete moves back in with his mom on Staten Island but is sent spiraling when he learns that the family has been dealing with tragic news without him; Pete uses his friends, connections and creativity to make the best of a sad situation.
2	"Do as I Say, Not as I do"	Jason Orley	Pete Davidson & Judah Miller	May 4, 2023 (Peacock); June 11, 2023 (NBC)
Seven-year-old Pete, his mom and his sister attend his aunt's wedding just weeks after the death of his father; his uncle Tommy steps in to be there for Pete when he needs him most; in present day, Pete makes sure to be there for Uncle Tommy.
3	"Picture"	Oz Rodriguez	Dan Bulla & Pete Davidson	May 4, 2023
Pete obsesses over an online photograph of himself that an internet troll has been posting, ending up on a dark path as he tries to hunt down the anonymous troll; Pete's mother, Amy, tries to protect Pete from himself.
4	"Crispytown"	Jason Orley	Judah Miller & Pete Davidson & Dave Sirus	May 4, 2023
Pete introduces his crew as they drive to Florida to hopefully perform a gig without any mishaps; the sudden appearance of an eccentric jeweler named "Crispy" kicks off a surreal and possibly hallucinated series of events.
5	"For Your Amusement"	Oz Rodriguez	Judah Miller & Pete Davidson & Dave Sirus	May 4, 2023
Pete wants to be a father, but only his mother supports the idea; Pete spends the day with a child at an amusement park to see what being a dad is like, while Amy pursues multiple angles to help make Pete a dad as soon as possible.
6	"ISO"	Jason Orley	Pete Davidson & Judah Miller & Jason Orley	May 4, 2023
Pete is miserable after getting stuck in Canada on Christmas to film a war movie; he wanders the strange, small town searching for a way to improve his mood until receiving a bizarre and probably hallucinated visit from a beloved celebrity.
7	"Borgnine"	Jason Orley	Pete Davidson & Judah Miller	May 4, 2023
The Canadian drugs take their toll on Pete, who manages to offend his entire family on a solemn occasion; his only choice is to go to rehab, but first he must meet with several people in his life to tell them that he's going away.
8	"Show Me the Way"	Jason Orley	Pete Davidson & Judah Miller	May 4, 2023
Pete goes to rehab and finds himself unable to avoid misadventures as his old friend Machine Gun Kelly shows up intent on getting him high; Pete's sister, Casey, is set to graduate without him there.

== Production ==
The series was first announced in March 2022, with Pete Davidson developing the series alongside Judah Miller and Dave Sirus, and Jason Orley set to direct. Davidson was also set to star. The series was given a greenlight by Peacock in April. The following month, Edie Falco was announced to play Davidson's mother in the series. In August, Joe Pesci was added to the cast as Davidson's grandfather. It was Pesci's second starring role in a television series, his first being the 1985 series Half Nelson.

Filming for the series began by October 2022, with a first look image of Davidson and Pesci released by Peacock. Most of the filming was done in New York. In April 2023, it was revealed that David Howard Thornton would appear in the series as Art the Clown. On June 23, 2023, Peacock renewed the series for a second season, but Davidson ultimately announced that he would not move forward with it.

== Release ==
All eight episodes of the first season were released on May 4, 2023, exclusively on Peacock. The series made its linear premiere on NBC in the United States on the early morning hours of June 4, 2023. In Canada, the series premiered May 25, 2023 on Showcase.

== Reception ==
Review aggregator Rotten Tomatoes reported an approval rating of 78% based on 51 reviews, with an average rating of 6.7/10. The website's critics consensus reads, "Pete Davidson's second crack at playing a fictionalized version of himself may feel faintly recycled, but a terrific supporting cast and some surprising depth ensure this series adds up to more than just Bupkis." Metacritic gave the first season a weighted average score of 67 out of 100 based on 25 reviews, indicating "generally favorable reviews".
