= Comedy Central Stand-Up Presents =

American stand-up comedy television series

- Original title card
- Genre: Stand-up comedy
- Created by: Paul Miller
- Directed by: Joe DeMaio; Ryan Polito
- Country of origin: United States
- Original language: English
- No. of seasons: 8
- No. of episodes: 108

Production
- Executive producers: John Bravakis; Stephen Kroopnick; Stu Schreiberg
- Producer: Neil A. Sheridan
- Production locations: Royale Theatre; Boston, Massachusetts (2012–15); Civic Theatre; New Orleans, Louisiana (2016–19)
- Running time: 22 minutes
- Production companies: Triage Entertainment; Comedy Partners

Original release
- Network: Comedy Central
- Release: May 11, 2012 – November 22, 2019

Related
- Comedy Central Presents

Comedy Central Stand-Up Presents, formerly known as The Half Hour, is an American stand-up comedy television series that airs on Comedy Central in the United States. The program features various stand-up comedians in each episode. It replaced the similar program Comedy Central Presents in 2012.

== Premise ==
The Half Hour shines a spotlight on some of the funniest and most unusual voices in stand-up comedy.

== Overview ==
Every episode features an up-and-coming comedian or sometimes a group performing an original set of stand-up. The first four seasons of the show were filmed at the Royale theatre in Boston, Massachusetts. Beginning with the fifth season, the comedians now perform their sets at the Civic Theatre in New Orleans, Louisiana. It was announced that a sixth season was picked up with 14 new stand-up comedians given their own set. It was also announced that the show will be retitled Comedy Central Stand-Up Presents.

== Episodes ==
Season	Episodes	Originally aired	
Season	Episodes	First aired	Last aired
1	12	May 11, 2012	June 15, 2012
2	17	May 4, 2013	January 5, 2014
3	14	June 6, 2014	July 25, 2014
4	14	August 23, 2015	November 28, 2015
5	17	August 26, 2016	October 21, 2016
6	13	September 15, 2017	October 27, 2017
7	9	September 28, 2018	October 26, 2018
8	12	October 18, 2019	November 22, 2019

=== Season 1 (2012) ===
No. overall	No. in season	Performer	Original release date
1	1	Rory Scovel	May 11, 2012
2	2	Michael Palascak	May 11, 2012
3	3	Na'im Lynn	May 18, 2012
4	4	Neal Brennan	May 18, 2012
5	5	Brendon Walsh	May 25, 2012
6	6	Nick Vatterott	May 25, 2012
7	7	Theo Von	June 1, 2012
8	8	Maronzio Vance	June 1, 2012
9	9	Joe Mande	June 8, 2012
10	10	Garfunkel and Oates	June 8, 2012
11	11	David O'Doherty	June 15, 2012
12	12	Jesse Popp	June 15, 2012

=== Season 2 (2013–14) ===
No. overall	No. in season	Performer	Original release date
13	1	Dan Soder	May 4, 2013
14	2	Nikki Glaser	May 4, 2013
15	3	Erik Griffin	May 11, 2013
16	4	Joe DeRosa	May 11, 2013
17	5	Dan St. Germain	May 18, 2013
18	6	Sean O'Connor	May 18, 2013
19	7	Jonah Ray	May 25, 2013
20	8	Gabe Liedman	May 25, 2013
21	9	Jared Logan	June 1, 2013
22	10	Mike Lawrence	June 1, 2013
23	11	Lil Rel Howery	June 8, 2013
24	12	Cristela Alonzo	June 8, 2013
25	13	Andy Haynes	June 15, 2013
26	14	Ben Kronberg	June 15, 2013
27	15	Baron Vaughn	June 22, 2013
28	16	Sean Patton	June 22, 2013
29	17	Brody Stevens	January 5, 2014

=== Season 3 (2014) ===
No. overall	No. in season	Performer	Original release date
30	1	Chris Distefano	June 6, 2014
31	2	Michael Che	June 6, 2014
32	3	Tommy Johnagin	June 13, 2014
33	4	Adam Newman	June 13, 2014
34	5	Chris Gethard	June 20, 2014
35	6	Yannis Pappas	June 20, 2014
36	7	Fortune Feimster	June 27, 2014
37	8	Ron Funches	June 27, 2014
38	9	Damien Lemon	July 11, 2014
39	10	Rachel Feinstein	July 11, 2014
40	11	Mark Normand	July 18, 2014
41	12	Joe Wengert	July 18, 2014
42	13	Kurt Braunohler	July 25, 2014
43	14	Joe Zimmerman	July 25, 2014

=== Season 4 (2015) ===
No. overall	No. in season	Performer	Original release date
44	1	Liza Treyger	August 23, 2015
45	2	Hampton Yount	August 23, 2015
46	3	Michelle Buteau	September 6, 2015
47	4	Barry Rothbart	September 6, 2015
48	5	Brooks Wheelan	September 20, 2015
49	6	Andy Woodhull	September 20, 2015
50	7	Randy Liedtke	October 11, 2015
51	8	Beth Stelling	October 11, 2015
52	9	Sam Morril	October 25, 2015
53	10	Joe List	October 25, 2015
54	11	Sean Donnelly	November 15, 2015
55	12	Phil Hanley	November 15, 2015
56	13	Tone Bell	November 28, 2015
57	14	Andrew Santino	November 28, 2015

=== Season 5 (2016) ===
No. overall	No. in season	Performer	Original release date
58	1	Noah Gardenswartz	August 26, 2016
59	2	Ramon Rivas II	August 26, 2016
60	3	Joe Machi	September 2, 2016
61	4	Drew Michael	September 2, 2016
62	5	Aparna Nancherla	September 9, 2016
63	6	Nate Fernald	September 9, 2016
64	7	Ali Siddiq	September 16, 2016
65	8	Cy Amundson	September 16, 2016
66	9	Emily Heller	September 23, 2016
67	10	Erik Bergstrom	September 23, 2016
68	11	Martha Kelly	September 30, 2016
69	12	Nick Turner	September 30, 2016
70	13	Mike Recine	October 7, 2016
71	14	Jacqueline Novak	October 7, 2016
72	15	Naomi Ekperigin	October 14, 2016
73	16	Ahmed Bharoocha	October 14, 2016
74	17	Matthew Broussard	October 21, 2016

=== Season 6 (2017) ===
No. overall	No. in season	Performer	Original release date
75	1	Chris Redd	September 15, 2017
76	2	Yamaneika Saunders	September 15, 2017
77	3	Shane Torres	September 22, 2017
78	4	Jenny Zigrino	September 22, 2017
79	5	Casey James Salengo	September 29, 2017
80	6	Jo Firestone	September 29, 2017
81	7	Anthony DeVito	October 6, 2017
82	8	Julio Torres	October 6, 2017
83	9	Josh Johnson	October 13, 2017
84	10	Sam Jay	October 13, 2017
85	11	Joel Kim Booster	October 20, 2017
86	12	Solomon Georgio	October 20, 2017
87	13	Adam Cayton-Holland	October 27, 2017

=== Season 7 (2018) ===
No. overall	No. in season	Performer	Original release date
88	1	Langston Kerman	September 28, 2018
89	2	Megan Gailey	September 28, 2018
90	3	Devin Field	October 5, 2018
91	4	Emmy Blotnick	October 5, 2018
92	5	Ryan O’Flanagan	October 12, 2018
93	6	Chris Garcia	October 12, 2018
94	7	Tim Dillon	October 19, 2018
95	8	Sarah Tiana	October 19, 2018
96	9	Mike Lawrence	October 26, 2018

=== Season 8 (2019) ===
No. overall	No. in season	Performer	Original release date
97	1	Jaboukie Young-White	October 18, 2019
98	2	Vanessa Gonzalez	October 18, 2019
99	3	Dulcé Sloan	October 25, 2019
100	4	Will Miles	October 25, 2019
101	5	Tom Thakkar	November 1, 2019
102	6	Mia Jackson	November 1, 2019
103	7	Joe Kwaczala	November 8, 2019
104	8	Nore Davis	November 8, 2019
105	9	David Gborie	November 15, 2019
106	10	Allen Strickland Williams	November 15, 2019
107	11	Charles Gould	November 22, 2019
108	12	Sara Schaefer	November 22, 2019
