= Pete Davidson =

American comedian and actor (born 1993)

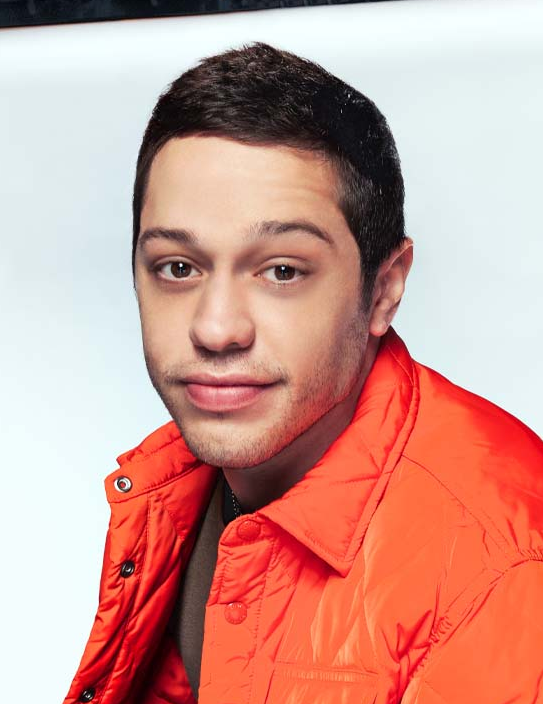
- Davidson in 2015
- Born: Peter Michael Davidson; November 16, 1993 (age 32); New York City, U.S.
- Children: 1

Comedy career
- Years active: 2010–present
- Medium: Stand-up; television; film
- Genres: Observational comedy; sketch comedy; black comedy; insult comedy; surreal humor; satire
- Subjects: American culture; everyday life; social awkwardness; recreational drug use; mental health; human sexuality; self-deprecation; pop culture

Peter Michael Davidson (born November 16, 1993) is an American comedian, actor, and writer. He began his career in the early 2010s with sporadic guest roles on Brooklyn Nine-Nine, Friends of the People, Guy Code, and Wild 'n Out before being hired as a cast member on the NBC late-night sketch comedy series Saturday Night Live (SNL), which he starred in for eight seasons from 2014 to 2022.

Following his rise to prominence on SNL, Davidson starred in and executive produced the comedy film Big Time Adolescence (2019), and co-wrote and starred in the semi-autobiographical comedy-drama film The King of Staten Island (2020), and the Peacock series Bupkis (2023). He continued acting in films such as The Suicide Squad (2021), Bodies Bodies Bodies, and Meet Cute (both 2022). Davidson has also released three comedy specials: Pete Davidson: SMD (2016), Pete Davidson: Alive from New York (2020), and Pete Davidson: Turbo Fonzarelli (2024).

== Early life ==
Peter Michael Davidson was born on November 16, 1993, in the Staten Island borough of New York City to parents Amy (née Waters) and Scott Matthew Davidson. Scott was a New York City firefighter for Ladder 118 who died in service during the September 11th attacks, along with the rest of his unit. He was last seen running up the stairs of the Marriott World Trade Center in Downtown Manhattan just before the building was destroyed when the Twin Towers collapsed. His Requiem Mass was held at St. Clare's Catholic Church in Great Kills, Staten Island. Davidson, then aged seven, later told The New York Times that it was "overwhelming" and that he later acted out in school as a result of the trauma, at one point ripping his hair out until he was bald. In October 2016, he revealed on The Breakfast Club morning radio show that he struggled with suicidal thoughts when he was younger and that the music of Kid Cudi saved his life.

Davidson's father was predominantly of Jewish ancestry, with some distant German, Irish and Italian roots. His mother is of mostly Irish ancestry, with some distant German roots. He has a younger sister named Casey, and was raised Catholic. Davidson attended St. Joseph by-the-Sea High School, and then Tottenville High School in Huguenot, before transferring to Xaverian High School in Bay Ridge, Brooklyn, and graduating from there in 2011. After high school, Davidson enrolled at St. Francis College in Brooklyn Heights, which he attended for one semester upon which he decided to drop out to pursue a full-time career in comedy. He first tried stand-up comedy at age sixteen in a Staten Island bowling alley, where a group of friends that included future professional baseball player Matt Festa, knowing of his comedy aspirations, dared him to take to the stage.

== Career ==
=== Early career (2013–2014) ===
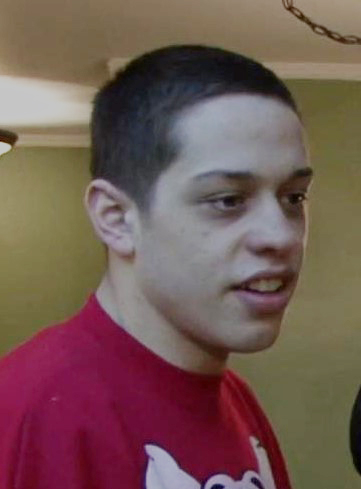
Davidson in 2013

Davidson's earliest onscreen appearance was in the third episode of the MTV comedy series Failosophy, which premiered February 28, 2013. The following month, he appeared in "PDA and Moms", a third-season episode of the MTV2 reality TV comedy series Guy Code, the first of four episodes in which he was featured. That June, his first televised standup aired as part of a second-season episode of the Comedy Central program Gotham Comedy Live, which showcases standup comedians at the Gotham Comedy Club in New York City. The following month, he returned to MTV2 with an appearance on Nick Cannon Presents: Wild 'N Out, his first of six appearances on that show. He subsequently made standup appearances on television and appeared in Brooklyn Nine-Nine. In 2014, he acquired a role in a Fox comedy pilot, Sober Companion, but it ultimately did not make it to series.

=== Saturday Night Live and breakthrough (2014–2022) ===
Davidson joined the cast of Saturday Night Live with the show's 40th-season premiere, which aired on September 27, 2014. At age 20, he was the first SNL cast member to be born in the 1990s and one of the youngest cast members ever. The first new addition to the cast that season, Davidson was given a chance to audition for the show through regular Bill Hader, whom he had met while filming a small part in the 2015 Judd Apatow feature film comedy Trainwreck. Hader subsequently told producer Lorne Michaels about him. His debut garnered positive critical notice, with his most noted skits during the season including an Indiana Jones-style sketch in which he and Dwayne "The Rock" Johnson, after being pelted with poison darts, were forced to mutually suck poison out of each other's various body parts, an endeavor that eventually found them entangled in the "69" position. Another involved Davidson being shot in the chest with an arrow by Norman Reedus. Over the years, Davidson played a number of characters, the most famous being Chad, an easily distracted apathetic man who first appeared in the season 41 episode hosted by Julia Louis-Dreyfus, as a pool boy who becomes entangled with a lonely housewife.

In March 2015, Davidson was a roaster on the Comedy Central Roast of Justin Bieber, and his set was praised as one of the best of the show. Among his bolder jokes was one at the expense of fellow roaster Snoop Dogg, host Kevin Hart, and their 2004 film Soul Plane. Davidson, whose firefighter father died responding to the September 11 attacks, called the film "the worst experience of [his] life involving a plane". In 2016, he was placed on the Forbes 30 under 30 list. In April of that year, Comedy Central filmed Davidson's first stand-up special, Pete Davidson: SMD, in New York City.

Davidson was criticized for mocking Republican congressional candidate Dan Crenshaw, who wears an eyepatch as a result of a wound incurred while serving in Afghanistan. He compared Crenshaw to "a hitman in a porno movie" and added, "I'm sorry, I know he lost his eye in war or whatever." In response to backlash over the comments, Davidson apologized and appeared beside Crenshaw the next Saturday on an SNL Weekend Update segment. Crenshaw accepted Davidson's apology and called on Americans to "never forget" the service and sacrifices of veterans.

The Roman Catholic Diocese of Brooklyn demanded an apology from Davidson in March 2019 after an SNL sketch in which he compared the Catholic Church to R. Kelly, an entertainer who had recently been charged with sexual abuse of minors. In the sketch, Davidson said, "[Kelly] is a monster and he should go to jail forever. But if you support the Catholic Church, isn't that like the same thing as being an R. Kelly fan? I don't really see the difference, except for one's music is significantly better." In a statement on its website, the diocese criticized the "disgraceful and offensive skit" and added, "The faithful of our Church are disgusted by the harassment by those in news and entertainment, and this sketch offends millions. The mockery of this difficult time in the Church's history serves no purpose." Davidson's comments came after the Diocese of Brooklyn and Queens agreed to a record $27.5 million settlement for sex abuse allegations in September 2018.

In January 2019, it was announced that Davidson would be touring with John Mulaney in New York, New Jersey, Pennsylvania, and Massachusetts for a limited series of comedy shows titled "Sundays with Pete & John". Mulaney and Davidson became close after appearing together on The Tonight Show Starring Jimmy Fallon and Saturday Night Live. That May, after the 44th-season finale of SNL, Travis M. Andrews of The Washington Post credited Davidson with being the most memorable performer that season and its breakout star, which Andrews attributed to Davidson's mining of his personal struggles and his admission of his comedic missteps, which Andrews felt gave the season a mixture of comedy and pathos.

Davidson collaborated with Machine Gun Kelly to write the sketch "A Message from the Count" for Kelly's album Hotel Diablo. In 2019 he starred in Jason Orley's Big Time Adolescence, and had supporting roles in Adam Shankman's What Men Want, Jeff Tremaine's The Dirt, Thurop Van Orman's The Angry Birds Movie 2, and John Turturro's The Big Lebowski spin-off The Jesus Rolls. In February 2020, Davidson released his stand up special Alive from New York on Netflix. In May 2020, The King of Staten Island was released, which Davidson both starred in and co-wrote with Judd Apatow, who also directed. Davidson was nominated for The Comedy Movie Star of 2020 for his work in The King of Staten Island and The Comedy Act of 2020 Pete Davidson: Alive from New York at the 46th People's Choice Awards. In April 2021, Davidson was cast as Joey Ramone in a Netflix biopic I Slept With Joey Ramone, based on the late singer's brother's memoir of the same name. Davidson will also serve as co-writer and executive producer. In August 2021, he appeared as Blackguard in The Suicide Squad directed by James Gunn. He voiced Marmaduke in an animated film released on Netflix on May 6, 2022. Following lengthy absences in season 47, it was announced shortly before its finale that it would be Davidson's last on Saturday Night Live.

=== Stardom and Bupkis (2023–present) ===
In 2023, Davidson starred in the Peacock original series Bupkis, which he also co-wrote. The series debuted to mixed reviews with The Guardian describing it as "messy" and compared it unfavorably to other shows, writing, "Though every piece seems to come from somewhere else, a derivative streak that undercuts the touches of personal specificity. Pete’s existential ambling suggests a dumber Louie, his travails in the surreal demimonde of celebrity suggest a dumber Atlanta, and his dealings with his coterie of hangers-on suggest a slightly less-dumb Entourage." Despite Peacock renewing the series for a second season, Davidson chose to not move forward with one.

In 2023 Davidson acted in three high-profile action franchise films. He appeared as Phlektik in Guardians of the Galaxy Vol. 3, Bowie in Fast X, and voiced Mirage in Transformers: Rise of the Beasts.

Davidson was among the comedians signed up to perform at the Riyadh Comedy Festival, which Joey Shea, Saudi Arabia researcher at Human Rights Watch, said the Saudi government used to whitewash its human rights abuses. Davidson's participation in particular drew widespread condemnation due to his father dying in the September 11 attacks and the alleged Saudi role in said attacks; a BBC report identified Saudi Arabia as the primary funding source for al-Qaeda, and 15 of the 19 hijackers were Saudi citizens. The festival was criticized by other comedians, including Marc Maron, Shane Gillis, and Zach Woods, who slammed the event and the comedians performing there. In an appearance on This Past Weekend with Theo Von, Davidson said, "I've heard there's subreddits of 'I think all these people are in bed with' being influenced by the Saudi Royal Family. I just—you know, I get the routing and then I see the number and I go, 'I'll go.'"

In January 2026, Davidson began a weekly program on Netflix, called The Pete Davidson Show.

== Comedy style ==
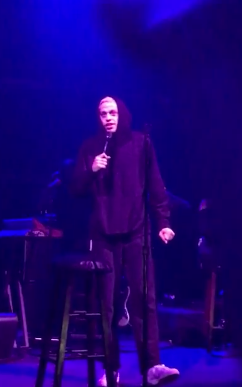
Davidson performing in 2018

Davidson has been praised for basing his comedy on his own life and employing aspects of his life that have been likened to "a series of brutal truths and vulgar confessions" which make him relatable to audiences. He discusses topics such as marijuana, sex, and relationships. He also speaks about incidents from his awkward high school experiences to living in a dormitory during his brief stint at St. Francis College. He jokes about highly sensitive subjects, including the loss of his father during the September 11 attacks. He says he finds that it encourages him to address the feeling of powerlessness that experiencing such an event at a young age inflicted upon him.

== Personal life ==
In October 2015, Davidson lived in Brooklyn Heights, New York. In 2019, he lived in Staten Island with his mother in a home they purchased together. In April 2021, he moved into his own residence in Staten Island. In February 2022, Davidson announced plans to move from Staten Island to Brooklyn to be closer to work. Davidson is the godfather of Leo, the son of fellow comedian and friend Ricky Velez. He is close friends with Cleveland Guardians pitcher Matthew Festa; the two were classmates at St. Joseph by the Sea High School.

Davidson once had many tattoos, but had had about 200 removed by 2025, "trying to clean slate it, trying to be an adult", though he said he intended to keep two or three.

Davidson supported Hillary Clinton in the 2016 U.S. presidential election, and on December 5, 2017, he wrote on his Instagram account that he got a tattoo on his leg of Clinton, whom he called his "hero", a "badass", and "one of the strongest people in the universe". Clinton thanked Davidson, joking: "This makes it significantly less awkward that I've had a Pete Davidson tattoo for years." He supported Joe Biden in the 2020 U.S. presidential election.

In 2023, Davidson and fellow SNL comedian Colin Jost purchased a decommissioned Staten Island Ferry boat. The ferry was used in the film Screamboat.

=== Health ===
Davidson was diagnosed with Crohn's disease at age 17 or 18, for which he receives intravenous biologic therapy, and has used medical marijuana for pain management and recreationally. On March 6, 2017, Davidson announced on his Instagram account that he had quit drugs and was sober for the first time in eight years. During an interview on comedian Marc Maron's podcast, Davidson clarified that the only drug he used was cannabis and, while he has since cut back on its use considerably, the personal and emotional problems he initially assumed were the result of his daily use were actually caused by his newly diagnosed borderline personality disorder, for which he has since been undergoing treatment.

On December 3, 2018, Davidson shared a candid Instagram post in which he expressed thoughts of suicide before deleting his account. The New York Police Department conducted a wellness check on Davidson in response to social media posts from followers and former fiancée Ariana Grande. Davidson had been at the Saturday Night Live studio at the time preparing for the last episode of the year before its holiday hiatus. Davidson and John Mulaney, comedian and former SNL writer, made humorous references to the Instagram post during the Weekend Update segment of the first episode following the holiday hiatus on January 19, 2019.

=== Relationships ===
Davidson dated comedian Carly Aquilino from 2014 until 2015 and actress Cazzie David from 2016 to 2018.

In May 2018, he began dating singer Ariana Grande after she broke up with Mac Miller. In June 2018, Davidson confirmed he was engaged to Grande, but the engagement was called off in October 2018 after Miller's death. Grande's song about Davidson, "Pete Davidson", is on her 2018 album Sweetener. She also referenced him in her song "Thank U, Next" with the lyric, "Even almost got married / And for Pete I'm so thankful". The relationship is also notable for popularizing the term "big dick energy".

In January 2019, Davidson was reported to be in a relationship with actress Kate Beckinsale, but by April they had "called time on their romance". In response to media comments about their age difference, he said that such an age gap was new to him and that the media should ask older men in longer relationships with younger women such as Leonardo DiCaprio, Alec Baldwin, Larry King, and Donald Trump about it.

Later in 2019, Davidson dated actress Margaret Qualley. Their relationship ended in October. He was involved with model Kaia Gerber from October 2019 to January 2020. In August 2021, he dated Bridgerton actress Phoebe Dynevor for five months.

Davidson and Kim Kardashian were first spotted out together in October 2021 after Kardashian appeared on Saturday Night Live. During her time hosting an episode of SNL, the two shared an on-screen kiss in a Disney-themed sketch where they played Jasmine and Aladdin. They began dating in November 2021. Kardashian filed for divorce from Kanye West in February 2021. She was legally declared single by a judge in March 2022. West referenced the relationship in his 2022 track "Eazy", in which he threatens to "beat Pete Davidson's ass". The video for "Eazy" depicts a claymation figure of Davidson being kidnapped, buried, and shown his severed head. West further attacked Davidson on Instagram in February 2022, calling him a "dickhead" and "Hillary Clinton's ex boyfriend". In August 2022, Davidson and Kardashian ended their relationship after nine months.

Between December 2022 and August 2023, Davidson dated actress Chase Sui Wonders. They met on the set of Bodies Bodies Bodies and she later co-starred in Davidson's streaming series Bupkis. He dated actress Madelyn Cline from September 2023 to July 2024.

In March 2025, Davidson began a relationship with model and actress Elsie Hewitt. The couple made their red carpet debut at the Blossom Ball in May and later moved in together, dividing their time between residences in Brooklyn and upstate New York. In December 2025, they had a daughter. In May 2026, it was reported that Davidson and Hewitt had separated.

=== Space flight ===
In March 2022, spaceflight company Blue Origin announced that Davidson would be an "honorary guest" alongside five paying customers onboard NS-20, a suborbital flight of its New Shepard craft planned for later that month, but the flight was rescheduled, and Blue Origin announced that Davidson was "no longer able" to join the crew of the craft.

=== Car crash incident ===
On March 4, 2023, Davidson crashed his car into a house while driving late at night. No one was injured in the crash. He was later charged with a misdemeanor for "reckless driving", and agreed to complete 50 hours of community service and attend 12 hours of traffic school as part of a diversion program.

== Filmography ==
=== Film ===
Film credits
Year	Title	Role	Notes
2014	School Dance	Stinkfinger	
2015	Trainwreck	Dr. Conner's Patient	
2018	Set It Up	Duncan	
2019	What Men Want	Danny	Uncredited
2019	Big Time Adolescence	Zeke	Also executive producer
2019	The Dirt	Tom Zutaut	
2019	The Angry Birds Movie 2	Jerry (voice)	
2019	The Jesus Rolls	Jack Bersome	
2020	The King of Staten Island	Scott Carlin	Also writer and executive producer
2021	The Suicide Squad	Richard Hertz / Blackguard	
2022	I Want You Back	Jase	Cameo
2022	Bodies Bodies Bodies	David	
2022	Marmaduke	Marmaduke (voice)	
2022	Good Mourning	Barry	
2022	Meet Cute	Gary	Also executive producer
2023	Guardians of the Galaxy Vol. 3	Phlektik	Cameo
2023	Fast X	Bowie	Cameo
2023	Transformers: Rise of the Beasts	Mirage (voice)	
2023	Dumb Money	Kevin Gill	
2023	Good Burger 2	Angry customer	Cameo
2024	Riff Raff	Lonnie	
2025	Dog Man	Petey (voice)	
2025	The Home	Max	
2025	The Pickup	Travis Stolly	
2026	One Night Only	Detective Jeterson	
2026	How to Rob a Bank	Vince	
TBA	Wizards!		Post-production
TBA	Bitcoin	Calvin Ayre	Post-production

=== Television ===
Television credits
Year	Title	Role	Notes
2013–2014	Wild 'N Out	Himself	7 episodes
2013–2014	Guy Code	Himself	Recurring
2013	Brooklyn Nine-Nine	Steven	Episode: "The Slump"
2014	Friends of the People	White supremacist	Episode: "The Horror"
2014–2022	Saturday Night Live	Various	159 episodes
2016	The Jim Gaffigan Show	Jeffy	Episode: "The List"
2016	Pete Davidson: SMD	Himself	Stand-up special
2017	Eighty-Sixed	Waiter	Episode: "The Birthday Monster"
2017	Click, Clack, Moo: Christmas at the Farm	Duck (voice)	Television film
2018	The Guest Book	Clem	Episode: "Invisible Son"
2020	Pete Davidson: Alive from New York	Himself	Stand-up special
2020	The Real Bros of Simi Valley	Grady	2 episodes
2020–2022	The Rookie	Pete Nolan	3 episodes
2020–present	The Freak Brothers	Phineas T. Phreakers (voice)	Main role
2021	The Now	Hardware Employee	Episode: "Call From... Mother"
2022	The Kids in the Hall	Donovan	Episode 1
2022	Pete Davidson Presents: The Best Friends	Himself (host)	Stand-up special
2022	Murderville	Himself	Episode: "Who Killed Santa? A Murderville Murder Mystery"
2022	The Kardashians	Himself	
2023	American Dad!	Toad Button (voice)	Episode: "Viced Principal"
2023	Bupkis	Himself	Main role; also creator, writer, and executive producer
2023	Saturday Night Live	Himself (host)	Episode: "Pete Davidson/Ice Spice"
2024	Tales of the Teenage Mutant Ninja Turtles	Rod (voice)	
2025	Family Guy	Himself	Episode: "Dog Is My Co-Pilot"
2025	Saturday Night Live	Himself	Episode: "Nikki Glaser/Sombr"
2026	Saturday Night Live	Tom Homan	Episode: "Alexander Skarsgård/Cardi B"

== Discography ==
Pete Davidson discography
Title	Year	Other artist(s)	Album	Notes
"A Message from the Count"	2019	Machine Gun Kelly	Hotel Diablo	Guest appearance
"Kevin and Barracuda (Interlude)"	2020	Machine Gun Kelly	Tickets to My Downfall	Guest appearance
"Wall of Fame (Interlude)"	2022	Machine Gun Kelly	Mainstream Sellout	Guest appearance
"Who Am I"	2023	Chris Webby	28 Wednesdays	
"Houdini"	2024	Eminem	The Death of Slim Shady (Coup de Grâce)	

== Awards and nominations ==
Awards and nominations for Pete Davidson
Award ceremony	Year	Category	Nominee(s) / Work(s)	Result
Golden Raspberry Awards	2023	Worst Actor	Marmaduke	Nominated
Golden Raspberry Awards	2023	Worst Supporting Actor	Good Mourning	Nominated
People's Choice Awards	2020	Comedy Movie of 2020	The King of Staten Island	Nominated
People's Choice Awards	2020	Comedy Movie Star of 2020	The King of Staten Island	Nominated
People's Choice Awards	2020	Comedy Act of 2020	Pete Davidson: Alive from New York	Nominated

== See also ==
- List of people diagnosed with Crohn's disease [[Category:Comedians from New York (state)]]
