= Molly McNearney =

American television writer and producer

- Born: March 5, 1978 (age 48)
- Education: University of Kansas
- Occupations: Television writer and producer
- Known for: Jimmy Kimmel Live!
- Spouse: Jimmy Kimmel (m. 2013)
- Children: 2

Molly McNearney (born March 5, 1978) is an American television writer and producer. She is the co-head writer and an executive producer of the late-night talk show Jimmy Kimmel Live! and the wife of host Jimmy Kimmel.

== Early life and education ==
McNearney grew up in Missouri. She was raised Catholic. She attended the St. Clare of Assisi elementary school in Ellisville near Chesterfield. She later attended St. Joseph's Academy for high school. She attended the University of Kansas. After graduating, she moved to Chicago and joined The Second City.

== Career and personal life ==
In 2004, McNearney started working on Jimmy Kimmel Live! as a writer's assistant. In 2008, she became the show's co-head writer.

McNearney and Kimmel married on July 13, 2013, in Ojai, California. They have a son and a daughter.

Their second child was born on April 21, 2017. He was born with a rare congenital heart defect, tetralogy of Fallot (TOF) with pulmonary atresia, which was first detected when he had a purplish appearance at three hours after birth. He underwent successful surgery at three days of age. The first guests Kimmel had when his show returned following their son's birth were cardiac surgeon Mehmet Oz, who explained the condition, and snowboarder Shaun White, who was born with TOF.

In November 2022, before the 2022 United States midterm elections, McNearney spoke during the show's monologue "urging people to vote for candidates that support abortion rights."

In 2025, McNearney won a Gracie Award for her work on Jimmy Kimmel Live!

In 2025, she revealed that she cut ties with family members that chose to support Donald Trump
