= Yannis Pappas =

American comedian

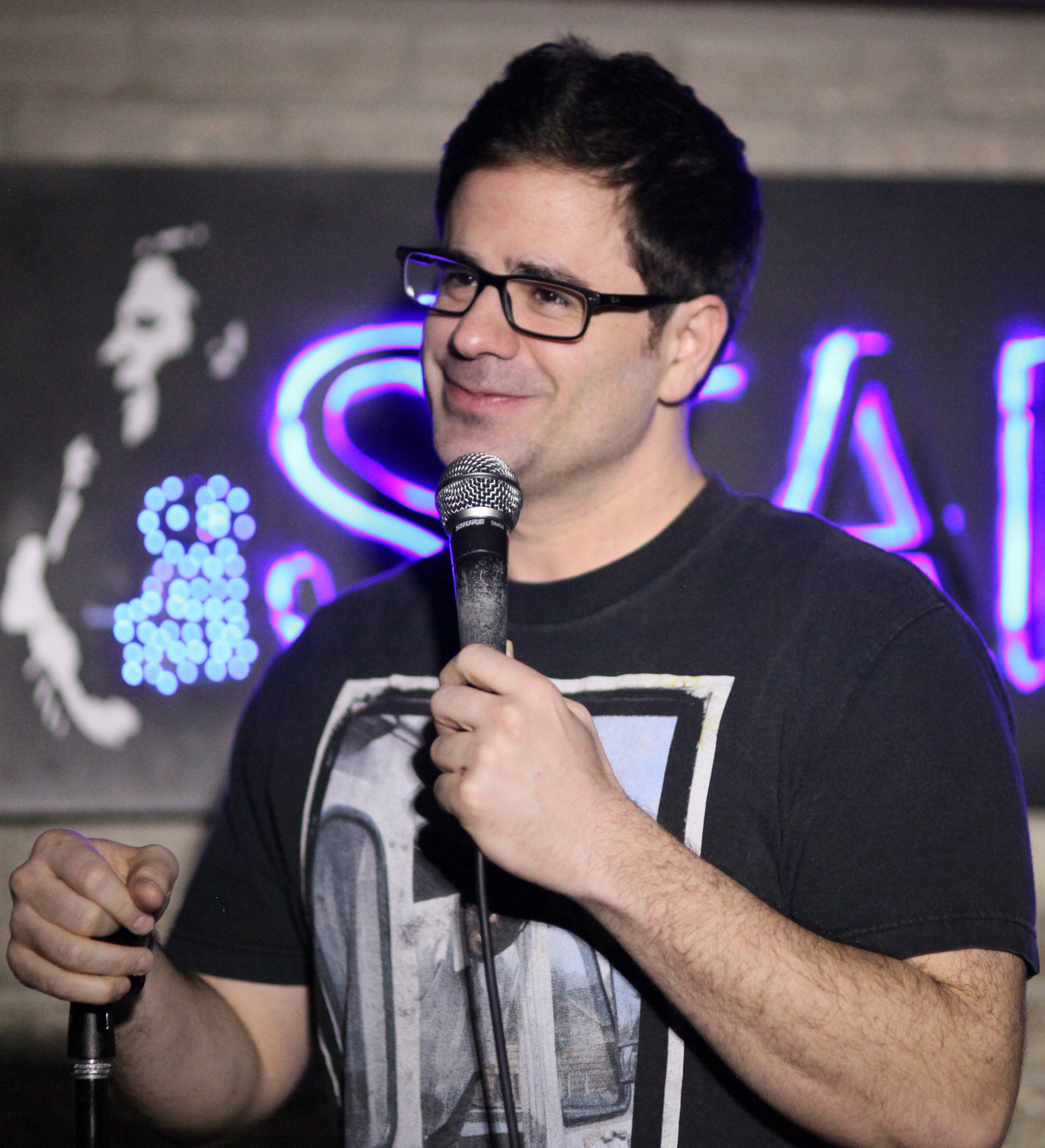
- Yannis Pappas in March 2017
- Born: Brooklyn, New York, U.S.
- Education: American University
- Spouse: Brittany Pappas (m. 2019)
- Children: 2

Comedy career
- Years active: 2000–present
- Medium: Stand-up, television
- Genres: Observational comedy, blue comedy, surreal humor, satire
- Subjects: American culture, human interaction, human behavior, self-deprecation
- Website: yannispappascomedy.com

Yannis Frederikos Christos Pappas (Greek: Γιάννης Φρειδερίκος Χρήστος Παππάς) is an American comedian from Park Slope, Brooklyn, New York.

== Early life ==
Pappas was born in Brooklyn, New York to Greek parents Chris Pappas, an Army officer, and Anna Pappas née Mamalakis, a lawyer originally from Rethymno, Crete. He was raised in the Brooklyn neighborhood of Park Slope with his two older brothers, Peter and Nikos. The former is a lawyer who worked for the Clinton and Obama administrations.

Pappas attended college at the American University in Washington, D.C. where he studied American Studies and History.

== Career ==
Pappas began his comedy career in 2000. After two years, he stopped performing, in large part, due to the effects of being shot during a robbery attempt. He returned to stand-up at the end of 2004. Pappas began pursuing comedy full-time in 2008.

Pappas has been featured doing stand up on AXS TV, TruTV's How To Be a Grown Up, VH1's Best Week Ever, Fox Business, and Good Morning America. He was the first comedian to ever do stand-up comedy on The Tonight Show Starring Jimmy Fallon; it was a test show and did not air.

Alongside his stand-up comedy, Pappas had previously partnered up with lifelong friend and director Jesse Scaturro to create the production company Ditch Films in the mid-2000s. The comedy production team produced live and filmed comedy. With Ditch Film, Pappas created his popular internet characters Maurica and Mr. Panos, which premiered online in 2010 and 2009, respectively.

Beginning in June 2013, Pappas co-hosted the MSG Network show The Bracket with Chris Distefano. Later in 2013, he began co-anchoring the live primetime news show Fusion Live alongside journalists, Marianna Antonio and Pedro Andrade. Focusing on current events, pop culture and satire, the show was one of the first for the then-new Fusion network. The show was canceled in December 2014. Beginning in Spring 2015, Pappas hosted the AOL Original Series, 2 Point Lead, a sports comedy show.

Pappas' first special, part of Comedy Central's The Half Hour series, aired in June 2014. In 2016, he released his comedy album Let Me Be Yannis, which was recorded live in Madison, Wisconsin. The album was awarded Album of the Year for 2016 by SiriusXM Comedy.

Starting in February 2018, Pappas co-hosted the weekly podcast History Hyenas via the Riotcast network with frequent collaborator Chris Distefano. The podcast entered a hiatus on March 24, 2021 and was brought back on November 7, 2024.

In 2019, Yannis released his first hour-long special Blowing the Light on YouTube. It was produced by comedian Andrew Schulz.

== Personal life ==
Earlier in his career, Pappas worked in the social work field; his work included participating in 9/11 disaster relief for two and a half years and working with people dealing with mental illness and homelessness for three years with Lutheran Social Services. When he was 21, he was shot in the right thigh outside of a New York nightclub during an armed robbery.

Pappas has lived in Park Slope on-and-off for much of his life. He moved to Miami in 2013 for the show Fusion Live. More recently, he lived in Bay Ridge.

== Discography ==
Comedy Specials

- Let Me Be Yannis (2016)
- Blowing the Light (2019)
- Mom Love (2022)
- Property Owner (2025)

Podcasts

- History Hyenas (with Chris Distefano) (February 2018 – March 2021)
- The Yannis Pappas Hour (January 2021 – present)
