= Girl Code =

American comedy television series

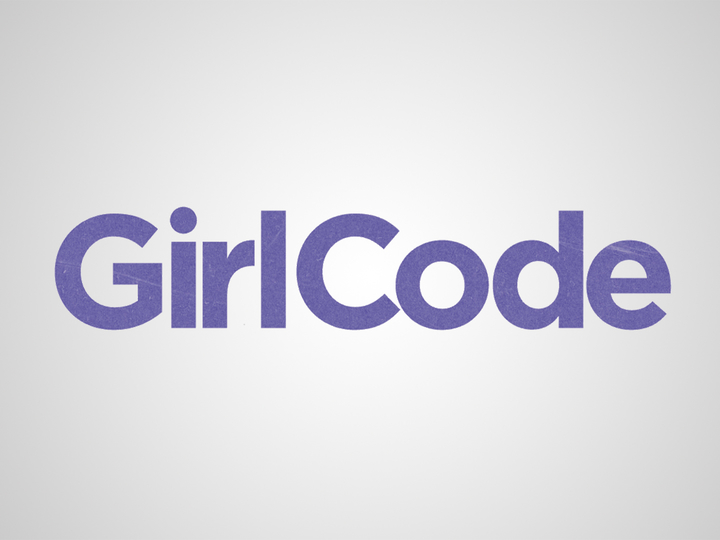
- Genre: Comedy
- Directed by: Laura Murphy
- Theme music composer: Flavorlab; Brian Quill
- Country of origin: United States
- Original language: English
- No. of seasons: 4 (television); 2 (Snapchat)
- No. of episodes: 75 (television)

Production
- Executive producers: Darin Byrne; Paul Ricci; Ryan Ling
- Running time: 22 minutes
- Production company: MTV Production Development

Original release
- Network: MTV (via Snapchat as of 2017)
- Release: April 23, 2013 – 2018

Related
- Guy Code

Girl Code is an American comedy television series that premiered on MTV on April 23, 2013. It is a spin-off series to Guy Code. The series features actresses, musicians, stand-up comics—plus a few men—who discuss the sisterhood that women share. It was announced on June 13, 2013, that the series had been renewed for a twenty-episode second season, which premiered on October 30, 2013. In April 2014, MTV announced the third season renewal of Girl Code, which premiered on October 1, 2014. In August 2015, MTV premiered a spin-off talk show called Girl Code Live hosted by Awkwafina, Nessa, and Carly Aquilino.

Girl Code was revived for Snapchat Discover by MTV on July 27, 2017, and a second Snap season premiered in March 2018.

== Cast ==
- Alesha Renee
- Alice Wetterlund
- Andrew Schulz
- Annie Lederman (Season 3–4)
- April Rose (Season 1–2)
- Awkwafina (Season 3–4)
- Carly Aquilino
- Charlamagne tha God
- Chris Distefano
- Clare Glomb
- Emmah Bowers
- Michelle Smith
- Esther Ku (Season 1–3)
- Ilana Becker
- Jade Catta-Preta (Season 3–4)
- Jamie Lee
- Jeff Dye (Season 1–2)
- Jessimae Peluso (Season 1–2)
- Jordan Carlos (Season 1–3)
- Matteo Lane (Season 4 + Snap seasons)
- Melanie Iglesias (Season 1–3)
- Nessa
- Nicole Byer
- Quinn Marcus
- Shalyah Evans
- Shannon Coffey (Season 4)
- Tanisha Long
- Tiara Thomas (Season 4)

== Episodes ==
=== Series overview ===
Season	Episodes	Originally released	
Season	Episodes	First released	Last released
1	21	April 23, 2013	July 7, 2013
2	20	October 30, 2013	April 20, 2014
3	18	September 7, 2014	December 29, 2014
4	16	June 3, 2015	September 30, 2015

=== Season 1 (2013) ===
No.	Title	Original release date	US viewers (millions)
1	"Crushes, Boobs, Roommates & Drinking"	April 23, 2013	1.39
2	"Dancing, Snooping, Waxing & Going to the Bathroom"	April 30, 2013	1.02
3	"Makeup, Being Gassy, Driving & Being Slutty"	May 7, 2013	1.12
4	"Girls' Night Out, Sexting, Breaking Up, Gynecologist"	May 14, 2013	0.48
5	"Social Networking, Friends With Benefits, Lying & Masturbation"	May 14, 2013	0.93
6	"Frenemies, Bad Boys, Dreams, Working Out"	May 19, 2013	0.67
7	"First Dates, Time of the Month, Girl Fights, Friend Zone"	May 19, 2013	0.67
8	"Dieting, Vacations, Neediness, Watching Sports"	May 19, 2013	0.77
9	"Foreplay, Shopping, Feeling Ugly, Guy Friends"	May 19, 2013	0.75
10	"Ex-boyfriends, Gossip, Sexually Transmitted Diseases, Hosting A Party, Dealing With An Old Hook-up At A Bar"	May 21, 2013	0.78
11	"Hair, Cheating, Compliments, Penises"	May 21, 2013	1.13
12	"Experimenting, Playing Sports, Dads"	May 28, 2013	0.79
13	"Getting Dumped, Being Classy, Working, Jealousy"	May 28, 2013	1.10
14	"Contraception, Whipped, Canceling, Plastic Surgery"	June 4, 2013	0.58
15	"Pregnancy Scares, Mean Girls, Sleepovers, Online Dating"	June 4, 2013	0.90
16	"Compliments, Shopping, Set-Ups, Hair"	June 18, 2013	0.44
17	"PDA, Style, Smoking, Calling Dibs"	June 18, 2013	0.55
18	"Taking a Break, Strip Clubs, Moms, Sororities"	July 7, 2013	0.52
19	"Porn, Set-Ups, Underwear, Social Climbing"	July 7, 2013	0.61
20	"Morning After, Boyfriends Friends, Flirting, Decorating"	July 7, 2013	0.68
21	"Rebounding, Cooking, Meeting the Parents, Bridesmaids"	July 7, 2013	0.79

=== Season 2 (2013–14) ===
No.	Title	Original release date	US viewers (millions)
1	"Halloween, Picking & Popping and Virginity"	October 30, 2013	0.64
2	"Vaginas, Texting, Apologizing"	November 6, 2013	0.71
3	"T-Blocking, Wine, Sweating"	November 13, 2013	N/A
4	"Getting Engaged, Pets, Insecurity"	November 20, 2013	N/A
5	"Guys That Are Taken, Gaining Weight, Karaoke"	November 27, 2013	N/A
6	"Boners, Puberty, Religion"	December 4, 2013	0.61
7	"Boyfriends' exes, astrology, babies, wet hair, inability to move on from a bad relationship."	December 10, 2013	0.63
8	"What a purse says about you, having a boyfriend, worrying about missing out."	December 17, 2013	0.72
9	"Lesbians, Crying, Telling a Story"	January 1, 2014	N/A
10	"Kissing, Being Scared, Snacking"	January 1, 2014	N/A
11	"One Night Stands; Sisters; Being Nerdy"	January 14, 2014	N/A
12	"Falling in Love; Nails; Being Creepy"	January 14, 2014	N/A
13	"Picking Up Guys, Getting Old, Sleeping"	February 2, 2014	N/A
14	"Long Distance Relationship, DIY, Shoes"	February 17, 2014	N/A
15	"Turning 21; Your Friends' Boyfriends; Clothing"	March 23, 2014	N/A
16	"DTR Talk; Being Sick; Hating"	March 23, 2014	N/A
17	"Anniversaries, Walking, Being Embarrassed"	April 6, 2014	N/A
18	"Birthdays, Bad Habits, Getting Back Out There"	April 6, 2014	N/A
19	"New Relationships; Getting Dressed; Brothers"	April 20, 2014	N/A
20	"Wingwomen; Friends; Being Alone"	April 20, 2014	N/A

=== Season 3 (2014) ===
No.	Title	Original release date	US viewers (millions)
1	"Back to School"	September 7, 2014	N/A
2	"Your Sexuality"	October 1, 2014	N/A
3	"Divorce"	October 8, 2014	N/A
4	"Strength"	October 8, 2014	N/A
5	"Race"	October 15, 2014	N/A
6	"Being Healthy"	October 15, 2014	N/A
7	"Girl Power"	October 22, 2014	N/A
8	"Money"	October 22, 2014	N/A
9	"Humor"	October 29, 2014	N/A
10	"Vacation"	October 29, 2014	N/A
11	"Bad Relationships"	November 5, 2014	N/A
12	"Self Expression"	November 12, 2014	N/A
13	"Holidays"	November 19, 2014	N/A
14	"Awkward And Faking It Special"	November 26, 2014	N/A
15	"Freshman Year"	December 10, 2014	N/A
16	"Bad Girls"	December 23, 2014	N/A
17	"Music"	December 29, 2014	N/A
18	"Sadness"	December 29, 2014	N/A

=== Season 4 (2015) ===
No.	Title	Original release date	US viewers (millions)
1	"Dry Spells, Slang, Quitting"	June 3, 2015	N/A
2	"Vomiting, The One, Pictures"	June 10, 2015	N/A
3	"Curing Boredom, Hobbies, Sexual Pressure"	June 17, 2015	N/A
4	"Being Naked, Listening, Guilt"	June 24, 2015	N/A
5	"Birth Control, Showing Off, Over Thinking"	July 13, 2015	N/A
6	"Vaginal Health, Smarts, Spoiling"	July 13, 2015	N/A
7	"Your Phone, Having a Baby, Anger"	July 27, 2015	N/A
8	"Butts, Attending Weddings, Therapy"	July 27, 2015	N/A
9	"Playing It Cool, Injuries/Getting Hurt, Parents and Technology"	August 3, 2015	N/A
10	"Moving Back In, Manners, Penis/Balls"	August 10, 2015	N/A
11	"Picking Up Guys 2.0, The Weekend, Your Voice"	August 10, 2015	N/A
12	"Watching TV, Hugging, Being Insecure"	August 17, 2015	N/A
13	"Eating Habits, Bad Sex, Grandparents"	August 17, 2015	N/A
14	"Pooping, Playing the Field, Interviewing"	September 14, 2015	N/A
15	"Hot Friend, Beards, Pampering Yourself"	September 21, 2015	N/A
16	"P-Power and Gay Besties"	September 30, 2015	N/A
