= Carly Aquilino =

American stand-up comedian and television personality

- Born: November 18, 1990 (age 35); Long Island, New York, U.S.
- Notable work: Girl Code; Secret Keepers Club Podcast

Comedy career
- Years active: 2012–present
- Medium: Stand-up, television, television personality

Carly Aquilino (born November 18, 1990) is an American stand-up comedian, actress, television host and television personality. Aquilino was a regular cast member of the Girl Code comedy series on MTV and was a host of Girl Code Live.

== Biography ==
Aquilino was born on Long Island, New York and worked as a hairdresser. She needed spinal surgery and recuperated for a year during which time she realized she couldn't work on her feet as a hairdresser. She started doing standup and was discovered at the Carolines comedy club by Ryan Ling. She got a job with Girl Code from this encounter. As of 2019, she was hosting a podcast with Emma Willman called Secret Keepers Club. She has made appearances on Uncommon Sense with Charlamagne, The Jim Gaffigan Show, The Playboy Morning Show and Hot Ones. She was one of the regular rotating co-hosts on Ridiculousness after Chanel West Coast's exit from the show. She has been a commentator on MTV Presents on MTV's Snapchat content.
