= List of The Nightly Show with Larry Wilmore episodes (2015) =

- No. of episodes: 152

Release
- Original network: Comedy Central

Season chronology
- ← Previous; Season 2014 Next → 2016 episodes

This is a list of episodes of The Nightly Show with Larry Wilmore hosted by Larry Wilmore from 2015.

== 2015 ==
=== January ===
No.	Title	Panelists	Original release date	US viewers (millions)
1	"State of the Black Protest"	Cory Booker, Talib Kweli, Bill Burr, Shenaz Treasury	January 19, 2015	0.963
Larry discusses the backlash over the Oscar nominations' lack of diversity and the success of recent protests. During the closing he pays tribute to Stephen Colbert for making the time slot special.
2	"Allegations Against Bill Cosby"	Jamilah Lemieux, Kathleen Madigan, Baratunde Thurston, Keith Robinson	January 20, 2015	0.828
Larry takes an unflinching look at the sexual assault allegations against Bill Cosby.
3	"Obama's State of the Union"	David Remnick, Jon Lovett, Amy Holmes, Godfrey	January 21, 2015	0.974
Larry discusses the 2015 State of the Union Address as well as the image and legacy of President Obama.
4	"U.S.-Cuba Relations"	John Leguizamo, Soledad O'Brien, Mauricio Claver-Carone, Mike Yard	January 22, 2015	0.782
Larry discusses the changing state of Cuba–United States relations.
5	"American Sniper"	Matt Taibbi, Paul Rieckhoff, Sabrina Jalees, Sgt. Nicholas Irving	January 26, 2015	1.114
Larry examines the controversy swirling around the movie American Sniper.
6	"Vaccines"	Holly Phillips, Judy Gold, Zoey O'Toole, Mike Yard	January 27, 2015	0.871
Larry talks about the Disneyland measles epidemic and the debate over vaccines.
7	"Money in Politics"	Zephyr Teachout, David Webb, Hari Kondabolu, Ted Alexandro	January 28, 2015	0.752
Larry discusses the Koch brothers and the flood of private money in political campaigns.
8	"The Culture of Lying in Sports"	Jake Tapper, Katie Nolan, Sherrod Small, Seaton Smith	January 29, 2015	0.795
Larry tackles the Deflategate scandal and dishonesty in professional sports.

=== February ===
No.	Title	Panelists	Original release date	US viewers (millions)
9	"Obesity in America"	Morgan Spurlock, Lavell Crawford, Shannon DeVido, Marianne Kirby	February 2, 2015	0.872
Larry addresses America's growing obesity rate.
10	"The State of Gay Marriage"	Sally Kohn, Lance Bass, Jessica Kirson, Michel Faulkner	February 3, 2015	0.723
Larry compares the struggles of black people with the struggles of the LGBT community; and gay marriage in the United States.
11	"Black Fatherhood"	Common, Mike Yard, Charles M. Blow, Joseph Jones	February 4, 2015	0.859
Larry discusses the presence of black fathers in their kid's lives. The opening segment is omitted in favor of an extended panel discussion and additional "Keep it 100" questions.
12	"Designer Babies"	Penn Jillette, Gabrielle Union, Rachel Feinstein, Dr. Holly Phillips	February 5, 2015	0.792
Larry discusses the pros and cons of "designer babies".
13	"War"	Michael McKean, Kimberly Dozier, Negin Farsad, Wes Moore	February 9, 2015	0.928
Larry discusses war.
14	"Parenting"	Retta, Pete Dominick, Deborah Tillman, Anne-Marie Johnson	February 10, 2015	1.071
Larry discusses parenting.
15	"Anti-vaxxers & Fat Acceptance"	Anthony Anderson, S. E. Cupp, Michaela Pereira, Rory Albanese	February 11, 2015	0.919
The show is composed of questions asked by viewers for Larry and the panel regarding topics discussed in previous episodes. The opening segment is omitted in favor of an extended panel discussion.
16	"He's Just Not That Into U.S.?"	Martin Short, Frank Rich, Big Sean, Tara Setmayer	February 23, 2015	0.920
Larry discusses Rudy Giuliani's claim that President Obama doesn't love America.
17	"Islamophobia in America"	Ahmed Shihab-Eldin, Dean Obeidallah, Reggie Love, Shenaz Treasury	February 24, 2015	0.786
Larry examines Islamophobia and Muslim extremism.
18	"Mars 2024"	Sonia Van Meter, Don Cheadle, Ricky Velez, Lee Daniels	February 25, 2015	0.751
Larry discusses the Mars One project, a one-way trip to Mars. Larry plays a game where he is a Martian asking the panel to describe earth things to him. Panelist Sonia Van Meter is a contender in actually participating in Mars One.
19	"Black Womanhood"	Issa Rae, Christina Greer, Jacque Reid, Marina Franklin	February 26, 2015	0.717
Larry discusses woman in the black community. The opening segment is omitted in favor of an extended panel discussion and additional "Keep it 100" questions.

=== March ===
No.	Title	Panelists	Original release date	US viewers (millions)
20	"Bill de Blasio"	Bill de Blasio	March 2, 2015	0.651
Larry has a one-on-one discussion with New York Mayor Bill de Blasio.
21	"Guns on Campus"	Joy Reid, Bonnie McFarlane, Megan Powers, Emma Iannini	March 3, 2015	0.673
Larry discusses allowing college students to carry guns on campus.
22	"Yes We Cannabis"	Adam Carolla, Carl Hart, Roland Martin, Michelle Buteau	March 4, 2015	0.745
Larry discusses the legalization of marijuana.
23	"Ferguson Police Report"	Sunny Hostin, Phillip Agnew, Michael Skolnik, Godfrey	March 5, 2015	0.746
Larry discusses the racial profiling in the Ferguson Police Department.
24	"High-Tech Moral Dilemma"	Cedric the Entertainer, Daymond John, Ted Alexandro, Maria Hinojosa	March 9, 2015	0.785
Larry ponders the moral ramifications of using technology made under hash working conditions.
25	"Oklahoma Frat Scandal & Women In Power"	Alicia Menendez, Egypt Sherrod, Chloe Hilliard, Jim Norton	March 10, 2015	0.843
Larry discusses the University of Oklahoma Sigma Alpha Epsilon racism incident, Larry and the panel discuss women's rights and leadership
26	"Banning Words"	Lizz Winstead, Maz Jobrani, John Avlon, Nick DiPaolo	March 11, 2015	0.786
Larry and the panel discuss political correctness and use of racist and sexist terms
27	"Robin Thicke's Legal Woes & Boxing"	Mike Tyson, Jackie Kallen, Keith Robinson, LZ Granderson	March 12, 2015	0.679
Larry discusses the "Blurred Lines" plagiarism lawsuit, Larry and the panel discuss boxing and its effect on athletes
28	"Unaccountable Rich People & March Madness"	Rob Corddry, Wale, Rachel Nichols, Barney Frank	March 16, 2015	0.704
29	"LGBT Groups & The St. Patrick's Day Parade"	Sherrod Small, Brendan Fay, Kathleen Madigan, Colin Quinn	March 17, 2015	0.687
Larry discusses the discrimination of the LGBT community in New York City's annual Saint Patrick's Day parade.
30	"Starbucks vs. Racism & Greedy Preachers"	Kurt Metzger, Shenaz Treasury, David Bullock, Bradley Whitford	March 18, 2015	0.794
31	"Race, Gender & Superheroes"	Jean Grae, Mike Lawrence, Phil Jimenez, Sana Amanat	March 19, 2015	0.605
32	"Starbucks's "Race Together" Campaign"	Kenneth Cole, Phoebe Robinson, Rosie Perez, 2 Chainz	March 23, 2015	0.707
Larry examines the race-based Starbucks campaign "Race Together".
33	"Ted Cruz's Presidential Run"	Lewis Black, Kristen Soltis Anderson, Amy Holmes, Kal Penn	March 24, 2015	0.807
Larry discusses Ted Cruz running in the 2016 presidential election.
34	"Slut-Shaming"	Jordan Carlos, Sabrina Jalees, Regina King, Shenaz Treasury	March 25, 2015	0.720
Larry defines the word "slut", and discusses slut-shaming.
35	"ISIS on Tatooine & McDonald's Bacon Rage"	Egypt Sherrod, Rory Albanese, Robert Reich, JB Smoove	March 26, 2015	0.680
Before going on a break Larry dedicates the entire episode to several small stories, that alone wouldn't warrant an entire episode.

=== April ===
No.	Title	Panelists	Original release date	US viewers (millions)
36	"Indiana's Religious Freedom Law"	James Adomian, Joy Reid, Mario Batali	April 6, 2015	0.581
Larry discusses the Religious Freedom Restoration Act in Indiana, and debuts his new desk.
37	"Welfare Restrictions & Fast-Food Wages"	Ricky Velez, Dorian Warren, Yvette Nicole Brown	April 7, 2015	0.603
Larry discusses the treatment of food stamp recipients.
38	"Walter Scott Shooting & Rand Paul 2016"	Bernie Sanders, Baratunde Thurston, Kat Timpf	April 8, 2015	0.638
Larry discusses the shooting of Walter Scott and Rand Paul running in the 2016 presidential election.
39	"The Cost of a College Education"	Fareed Zakaria, Kurt Metzger, Anya Kamenetz	April 9, 2015	0.619
Larry hosts the entire episode in a full spandex suit, as he promised as a result of the outcome of the "Dare-y Wilmore's March Badness Bracketsball Dare-O-Mania 2015 – It's Boner Time!" game. Larry also discusses the price of a college and ponders if college is even worth it in particular cases.
40	"Hillary Clinton's Presidential Bid"	Ricky Velez, Nia-Malika Henderson, Debi Mazar	April 13, 2015	0.660
Larry discusses the 2016 presidential campaign for Hillary Clinton.
41	"Boston Marathon Bomber & the Death Penalty"	Dan Soder, Keith Robinson, Alex Wagner, Linda Pacotti	April 14, 2015	0.705
Larry discusses the fate of Dzhokhar Tsarnaev, who has been found guilty perpetrating the Boston Marathon bombings in 2013. Larry also discuses the usage of capital punishment in the United States. Panelist Alex Wagner had to leave early, and was replaced by audience member Linda Pacotti to participate in the game "Cool & Unusual".
42	"Snitching in America & Mike Yard's Tax Tips"	Chris Distefano, Ras Baraka, Cam'ron	April 15, 2015	0.597
Larry discusses the pros and cons of snitching on people. Mike Yard offers tax tips during his segment "Savin' Hard with Yard".
43	"Aaron Hernandez Verdict & Conspiracy Talk"	Neil deGrasse Tyson, Mike Cannon, Robin Thede	April 16, 2015	0.803
Larry examines various conspiracy theories.
44	"Britt McHenry & Ben Affleck's Ancestry"	Chrissy Teigen, Mike Yard, Philip Galanes	April 20, 2015	0.531
Larry discusses Britt McHenry's publicly taped verbal abuse controversy, and Ben Affleck having references to his slave owning ancestors removed from his appearance on Finding Your Roots.
45	"Walmart Closures & A Cop's Non-Lethal Force"	Ricky Velez, Cristela Alonzo, Scarface	April 21, 2015	0.780
Larry discusses abrupt layoffs from Walmart, water being shut off for low income people in Baltimore, and a policeman who did not commit police brutality.
46	"Biking While Black & California's Drought"	Guy Branum, Judy Gold, Kevin Johnson	April 22, 2015	0.503
Larry discusses the water drought in California.
47	"Preaching on Mars & Teacher-Student Sex"	Kevin Pollak, Mo'Nique, Shenaz Treasury	April 23, 2015	0.558
Larry discusses pastor Creflo Dollar trying to fund missionary trips to Mars and relationships between students and teachers.
48	"Bruce Jenner's Gender Transition"	Jordan Carlos, Ian Harvie, Geena Rocero	April 27, 2015	0.750
Larry discusses Caitlyn Jenner's gender transition, (Note: Jenner changed her name due to gender transition in 2015.) and has Ian Harvie explain different gender identities to him.
49	"Baltimore Riots"	Kerry Coddett, Seaton Smith, Phillip Agnew	April 28, 2015	0.676
Larry discuses the unfolding riots in Baltimore, and the media's coverage of them.
50	"Baltimore Unrest & The "Thug" Debate"	Chloe Hilliard, Charlamagne Tha God, Bob Costas	April 29, 2015	0.652
Larry discuses the new developments in the Baltimore riots and their media coverage, and Felonious Munk debuts to question the use of the word "thug".
51	"Baltimore Gang Truce & Gay Marriage Fears"	Brad Garrett, Dana Perino, Lewis Black	April 30, 2015	0.489
Larry travels to a diner in Baltimore for a pre-taped out-of-studio interview with members of the Bloods and members of the Crips, who have called a truce with each other. Larry (back in the studio) then discusses a claim linking gay marriage to abortion. Later, with the panel, Larry hosts various short discussions about random topics chosen by the panelists from the "Bag of Grabs".

=== May ===
No.	Title	Panelists	Original release date	US viewers (millions)
52	"Baltimore Unrest & The Origins of Racism"	Bill Nye, Ricky Velez, Mike Yard	May 4, 2015	0.665
Larry discusses the developments in Baltimore and asks various science questions Bill Nye.
53	"Cinco de Mayo & Muhammad Art Show Shooting"	Shenaz Treasury, Dean Obeidallah, Lavell Crawford	May 5, 2015	0.757
Larry discusses the holiday Cinco de Mayo, and the shootings at the Curtis Culwell Center, as backlash from an exhibition featuring works depicting Muhammad.
54	"Hillary Clinton in Brooklyn & Menopause Debate"	Susie Essman, Nicolle Wallace, Holly Walker	May 6, 2015	0.532
55	"Thursday Cray Day & Mother's Day Tribute"	Jacque Reid, Ricky Velez, Kenny Lucas, Keith Lucas	May 7, 2015	0.604
56	"Bigoted Educators & Racist San Francisco Cops"	Rachel Feinstein, Will Packer, Mike Yard	May 11, 2015	0.574
57	"Morgan Freeman on Soul Daddy & FLOTUS Critics"	Ali Wentworth, Dan Savage, Kerry Coddett	May 12, 2015	0.640
58	"Cuban Test for Ted Cruz and Filming the Police"	Joel McHale, Ahmed Ahmed, Lola Ogunnaike	May 13, 2015	0.560
59	"Student vs Jeb Bush and Mad Men Finale"	Vincent Kartheiser, Rory Albanese, Robin Thede	May 14, 2015	0.546
60	"Cannes Controversy & Pornified Society"	Rashida Jones, Mike Yard, Holly Walker	May 26, 2015	0.646
61	"Drinkable Sewage & Josh Duggar Abuse Scandal"	Constance Zimmer, Sabrina Jalees, Jermaine Fowler	May 27, 2015	0.625
62	"FIFA Scandal & "The Briefcase""	Abbi Jacobson, Ilana Glazer, Ricky Velez	May 28, 2015	0.611

=== June ===
No.	Title	Panelists	Original release date	US viewers (millions)
63	"Jefferson Davis Day & Dennis Hastert Scandal"	Christiane Amanpour, Jordan Carlos, Christian Finnegan	June 1, 2015	0.645
64	"Supreme Court Rulings & Police Slowdown"	Godfrey, Jamilah Lemieux, Marc Lamont Hill	June 2, 2015	0.620
65	"Racist Dr. Seuss & Nebraska Death Penalty"	Kristina Wong, Jo Koy, Dan St. Germain	June 3, 2015	0.796
66	"Evan Young's Graduation Speech & TSA Failures"	Dave Rubin, Angie Martinez, Tom Papa	June 4, 2015	0.636
67	"Texas Pool Party Incident & Candidate Roundup"	Seaton Smith, Bonnie McFarlane, Frank Luntz	June 8, 2015	0.669
68	"Manhunt in New York & Donald Rumsfeld on Iraq"	Jeff Ross, Lola Ogunnaike, Ricky Velez	June 9, 2015	0.681
69	"Viagra for Women & Fox News's Victim-Blaming"	Kerry Coddett, Roshini Raj, Earthquake	June 10, 2015	0.617
70	"Soul Food Sit-Down with Lincoln Chafee"	Lincoln Chafee, Mike Yard, Gina Yashere, Vince Staples	June 11, 2015	0.566
71	"Rachel Dolezal Race Controversy"	Robin Thede, Natasha Leggero, Killer Mike	June 15, 2015	0.700
72	"Donald Trump 2016 & Soul Daddy on Mexico"	Lewis Black, Ricky Velez, June Sarpong	June 16, 2015	0.695
73	"Crisis in Haiti & Women's Sports"	Holly Walker, Ali Wentworth, Jamil Smith, Boris Kodjoe	June 17, 2015	0.738
74	"Church Shooting in South Carolina"	Joaquin Castro, Christina Greer, Joshua DuBois, Mike Yard	June 18, 2015	0.754
75	"Confederate Flag Battle in South Carolina"	Jordan Carlos, Riki Lindhome, Gayle King	June 22, 2015	0.771
76	"California's Drought & Don Lemon's Race Card"	Naomi Ekperigin, Joe Morton, Rory Albanese	June 23, 2015	0.722
77	"Fox News Ax Gaffe & Confederate Flag History"	Bonnie McFarlane, David Alan Grier, Talib Kweli	June 24, 2015	0.792
78	"Obamacare Victory & Boston Bomber Apology"	Reza Aslan, Horatio Sanz, Mike Yard	June 25, 2015	0.732
79	"Marriage Equality in the U.S."	Guy Branum, Janet Mock, Jordan Carlos	June 29, 2015	0.757
80	"Chris Christie's Presidential Bid"	Chris Distefano, Boy George, Alyona Minkovski	June 30, 2015	0.848

=== July ===
No.	Title	Panelists	Original release date	US viewers (millions)
81	"Black Church Fires & The Pope's Liberal Views"	Jim Gaffigan, Kerry Coddett, Cenk Uygur	July 1, 2015	0.749
82	"Bree Newsome Interview & Dumping Donald Trump"	Bree Newsome, Rory Albanese, Ricky Velez, Holly Walker, Mike Yard	July 2, 2015	0.811
83	"Donald Trump vs. Pows & Bill Cosby Backlash"	Mike Yard, Kerry Coddett, Sunny Hostin	July 20, 2015	0.789
84	"Ashley Madison Hack & Confederate Flag Rally"	Judd Apatow, 50 Cent, Rachel Feinstein	July 21, 2015	0.898
85	"Gangsta Donald Trump & "All Lives Matter""	Uzo Aduba, Gary Owen, Lavell Crawford	July 22, 2015	0.769
86	"Racial Weather & Sandra Bland's Arrest"	Jordan Carlos, Mark DeMayo, Christina Greer	July 23, 2015	0.820
87	"Bill Cosby Fights Back & Controversial Humor"	Sally Kohn, Colin Quinn, Gina Yashere	July 27, 2015	0.707
88	"Carefree Jon Stewart & Gun Control Debate"	Penn Jillette, Brina Milikowsky, Ricky Velez	July 28, 2015	0.699
89	"Cecil the Lion & Tom Brady's Cell Phone"	Rory Albanese, Bobcat Goldthwait, Baratunde Thurston	July 29, 2015	0.756
90	"Samuel DuBose Shooting & Plantation Weddings"	Ed Helms, Big K.R.I.T., Robin Thede	July 30, 2015	0.728

=== August ===
No.	Title	Panelists	Original release date	US viewers (millions)
91	"Joe Biden's Rumored Presidential Run"	Rory Albanese, Deon Cole, Julie Klausner	August 3, 2015	0.954
92	"Senate Blocks Planned Parenthood Defunding"	Lennon Parham, Jessica St. Clair, Mike Yard	August 4, 2015	0.792
93	"GOP Candidates & AP American History Debate"	Jerrod Carmichael, Craig Robinson, Ricky Velez	August 5, 2015	1.007
94	"GOP Presidential Debate"	Chris Gethard, Yamaneika Saunders, Mike Yard	August 10, 2015	0.589
95	"Ferguson Anniversary & Paid Parental Leave"	Jordan Carlos, Regina Hall, Carey Reilly	August 11, 2015	0.561
96	"Bernie Sanders & Gender-Neutral Toy Aisles"	Rory Albanese, Alonzo Bodden, Andrea Savage	August 12, 2015	0.481
97	"Jeb Bush, Bernie Sanders & Hillary Clinton"	Ophira Eisenberg, Michael Rapaport, Mike Yard	August 13, 2015	0.469
98	"Donald Trump's Chopper & Amazon Work Woes"	Paul Scheer, Robin Thede, Mike Yard	August 17, 2015	0.476
99	"Hillary Clinton and Black Lives Matter"	Lil Duval, Christina Greer, Mike Yard	August 18, 2015	0.427
100	"Birthright Citizenship & Gay Adoption Ban"	Brett Gelman, Calise Hawkins, Lil Rel Howery	August 19, 2015	0.509
101	"Deez Nuts 2016 & Painted Ladies in NYC"	Rory Albanese, Chris D'Elia, Hadiyah Robinson, Mike Yard	August 20, 2015	0.394

=== September ===
No.	Title	Panelists	Original release date	US viewers (millions)
102	"Hillary Clinton's Emails & Kim Davis"	Kerry Coddett, Matteo Lane, Mike Yard	September 8, 2015	0.367
103	"Billy Gardell & Buzz Aldrin"	Buzz Aldrin, Jordan Carlos, Billy Gardell, Natasha Rothwell	September 9, 2015	0.396
104	"Dick Cheney on Iran Deal & NFL Scandals"	Rory Albanese, Tony Richardson, Mike Yard	September 10, 2015	0.223
105	"Oath Keepers & Donald Trump's Tweets"	Mac Miller, Brooke van Poppelen, Mike Yard	September 14, 2015	0.286
106	"Fake War on Cops & Religion in America"	Jordan Carlos, Chloé Hilliard, Salman Rushdie	September 15, 2015	0.345
107	"Ben Carson's Rise & #IStandWithAhmed"	Calise Hawkins, Ice-T, Ricky Velez	September 16, 2015	0.441
108	"GOP Primary Debates: Round Two"	Rory Albanese, Tom Papa, Joy-Ann Reid	September 17, 2015	0.330
109	"Bernie Sanders Interview"	The Game, Bernie Sanders, Cipha Sounds, Robin Thede	September 21, 2015	0.394
110	"Gay Army Secretary & Women in Combat"	Elena Duffy, Benari Poulten, Egypt Sherrod, Sal Vulcano	September 22, 2015	0.408
111	"Ahmed Mohamed Interview & Popular Pope"	Naomi Klein, Ahmed Mohamed, Derek Waters, Mike Yard	September 23, 2015	0.410
112	"Pope Francis in NYC & Deadly Selfies"	Kerry Coddett, Will Forte, Andrew Rannells	September 24, 2015	0.311
113	"Penis Shootings & Jeb Bush on Race"	DeRay Mckesson, Rory Albanese, Mike Yard	September 28, 2015	0.511
114	"Awkward U.N. Summit & Water on Mars"	Michelle Buteau, Bill Nye, Ricky Velez	September 29, 2015	0.660
115	"House Republicans vs. Cecile Richards"	Marina Franklin, Robert Reich, Mike Yard	September 30, 2015	0.582

=== October ===
No.	Title	Panelists	Original release date	US viewers (millions)
116	"Russia in Syria and Trump University Scandal"	Jordan Carlos, Eddie Huang, Lisa Ling	October 1, 2015	0.546
117	"Mass Shooting in Oregon"	Rory Albanese, Ashleigh Banfield, Mike Yard	October 5, 2015	0.523
118	"The Publics Perception of Hillary Clinton"	John Avlon, Joey Bada$$, Jessica Kirson	October 6, 2015	0.479
119	"Ben Carson's Gun Policy & The Right to Die"	Michelle Collins, Bobby Gaylor, Jay Leno	October 7, 2015	0.462
120	"Rupert Murdoch Backs Ben Carson"	Jordan Carlos, Shannon DeVido, Bobcat Goldthwait	October 8, 2015	0.505
121	"Ice Cream Sit-Down with Nancy Pelosi"	James Davis IV, Jeezy, Nancy Pelosi, Mike Yard	October 12, 2015	0.480
122	"Racist Pirate Toy & Outsider Candidates"	Kathleen Madigan, Seaton Smith, Jesse Ventura	October 13, 2015	0.475
123	"Democratic Presidential Debate"	Rory Albanese, Steve Kornacki, Gabrielle Union	October 14, 2015	0.527
124	"Cops vs Cameras and Assertive Women"	Raul de Molina, Grace Parra, Holly Walker	October 15, 2015	0.426
125	"Donald Trump on 9-11 and Operation GroupMe"	Raury, Natasha Rothwell, Mike Yard	October 19, 2015	0.377
126	"Toddlers with Guns & Wealth Therapy"	Joe Budden, Jeff Daniels, Rachel Feinstein	October 20, 2015	0.535
127	"CIA Email Hack & Joe Biden's 2016 Plans"	Terry Crews, Ryan Duffy, Holly Walker	October 21, 2015	0.484
128	"Ferguson Fires & Paul Ryan's Demands"	Judah Friedlander, Lucy Lawless, Bonnie McFarlane	October 22, 2015	0.535

=== November ===
No.	Title	Panelists	Original release date	US viewers (millions)
129	"Soul Food with Rand Paul & Inmate Release"	Rand Paul, Ana Kasparian, Bob Saget	November 2, 2015	0.342
130	"GOP Debate Gripes & Ben Carson's Rise"	Jordan Carlos, Ron Perlman, Crystal Wright	November 3, 2015	0.391
131	"No Legal Weed in Ohio & Science vs Faith"	Carl Lentz, Tom Papa, Grace Parra, Neil deGrasse Tyson, Ricky Velez, Mike Yard	November 4, 2015	0.599
132	"Ben Carson's Rap Song & Celeb Activism"	Bobby Gaylor, Niecy Nash, Lola Ogunnaike	November 5, 2015	0.495
133	"Racist Wrestling & Female Sexuality Study"	Alex Berg, Grace Parra, Mike Yard	November 9, 2015	0.420
134	"Ricky Velez vs Virgil & Climate Action"	Rory Albanese, Bridget Everett, Bill Nye	November 10, 2015	0.536
135	"Shonda Rhimes & GOP Candidates"	Shonda Rhimes, Jordan Carlos, Steve Kornacki, Franchesca Ramsey	November 11, 2015	0.564
136	"Starbucks Holiday Cup & Norman Lear"	Norman Lear, Bill Engvall, Rick Ross	November 12, 2015	0.620
137	"Democratic Debate & Paris Attacks"	John Avlon, John Green, Dean Obeidallah	November 16, 2015	0.466
138	"Refugee Rejection & Campus Protests"	Jonathan Butler, Jadakiss, Grace Parra	November 17, 2015	0.437
139	"Ben Carson's Map & Emojis"	Ty Dolla Sign, Rory Albanese, Robin Thede	November 18, 2015	0.472
140	"Mike Yard's NHL Adventure & Thanksgiving"	Sway, Holly Walker, Mike Yard	November 19, 2015	0.530
141	"Planned Parenthood Attack"	Busta Rhymes, Jordan Carlos, Grace Parra	November 30, 2015	0.488

=== December ===
No.	Title	Panelists	Original release date	US viewers (millions)
142	"Texas Textbook Controversy & Donald Trump"	Pete Wentz, Holly Walker, Ricky Velez	December 1, 2015	0.491
143	"Laquan McDonald Shooting & Spike Lee"	Rory Albanese, Mike Yard, Spike Lee	December 2, 2015	0.618
144	"Mass Shootings & Violent Baby Names"	Bobby Gaylor, Robin Thede, Brian Posehn	December 3, 2015	0.534
145	"Obama's Isis Speech & Political Panderers"	Rory Albanese, Mike Yard, Jon Glaser	December 7, 2015	0.532
146	"Donald Trump's Muslim Immigration Ban"	Jordan Carlos, Grace Parra, Mark Cuban	December 8, 2015	0.500
147	"China's Smog Alert & The Social Media Age"	Robin Thede, Rory Albanese, Lee O'Denat (Q)	December 9, 2015	0.734
148	"Affirmative Action Suit & Donald Trump"	Kevin Nealon, Grace Parra, Mike Yard	December 10, 2015	0.475
149	"Confederate Christmas Card & Ted Cruz"	Mike Yard, Aida Rodriguez, Jordan Carlos	December 14, 2015	0.489
150	"Bill Cosby's Countersuit & Face of Jesus"	Taye Diggs, Rory Albanese, Robin Thede	December 15, 2015	0.330
151	"The Fifth GOP Debate & Serena Williams"	Grace Parra, Holly Walker, T-Pain	December 16, 2015	0.481
152	"Martin Shkreli's Arrest & 2015 Roundup"	Mike Yard, Rory Albanese, Pusha T	December 17, 2015	0.494
