= List of The Nightly Show with Larry Wilmore episodes (2016) =

- No. of episodes: 107

Release
- Original network: Comedy Central

Season chronology
- ← Previous; 2015 episodes Next → Season 2017

The following is a list of episodes of The Nightly Show with Larry Wilmore hosted by Larry Wilmore from 2016.

== 2016 ==
=== January ===
No.	Title	Panelists	Original release date	US viewers (millions)
153	"Bill Cosby's Arrest & Oregon Militia Group"	Franchesca Ramsey, Mike Yard, Holly Walker	January 4, 2016	0.587
154	"Sexist Donald Trump & Bernie Sanders Chat"	Jordan Carlos, Grace Parra, Bernie Sanders	January 5, 2016	0.525
155	"Barack Obama's Tears & Violence in America"	Wesley Morris, Robin Thede, Ricky Velez	January 6, 2016	0.616
156	"Kim Jong-un's H-Bomb Test and Robotic Cops"	Hank Azaria, Mike Yard, Rory Albanese	January 7, 2016	0.479
157	"Sean Penn's El Chapo Interview"	Mike Yard, Grace Parra, Tavi Gevinson	January 11, 2016	0.343
158	"Syrian Refugees in Texas & Lottery Debate"	Kathleen Madigan, Rory Albanese, Ricky Velez	January 12, 2016	0.489
159	"Barack Obama's Final State of the Union"	Mario Batali, Mike Yard, Holly Walker	January 13, 2016	0.56
160	"Militia Dildos & Bernie Sanders's Surge"	John Fetterman, Rory Albanese, Robin Thede	January 14, 2016	0.503
161	"Rebranding the KKK & Ted Cruz vs. NYC"	Mike Yard, Ricky Velez, Rembert Browne	January 18, 2016	0.442
162	"Donald Trump's Bible Gaffe & Oscar Debate"	Romany Malco, Robin Thede, Holly Walker	January 19, 2016	0.528
163	"Sarah Palin's Trump Speech & Smart Sex"	Dan Savage, Bobby Gaylor, Grace Parra	January 20, 2016	0.565
164	"Track Palin's Arrest & Black Awards Shows"	Jemele Hill, Jordan Carlos, Robin Thede	January 21, 2016	0.528
165	"Rand Paul Talks Donald Trump's Candidacy"	Holly Walker, Rory Albanese, Marlon Wayans	January 25, 2016	0.489
166	"Planned Parenthood Wins & Hillary Clinton"	Jena Friedman, Mike Yard, Robin Thede	January 26, 2016	0.509
167	"Neil deGrasse Tyson's B.o.B Smackdown"	Brandon Marshall, Jordan Carlos, Ricky Velez	January 27, 2016	0.549
168	"Militant Cops & Michael Jackson Portrayal"	Chris Distefano, Robin Thede, Grace Parra	January 28, 2016	0.467

=== February ===
No.	Title	Panelists	Original release date	US viewers (millions)
169	"Timbaland Flint Controversy & Iowa Caucus"	Gad Elmaleh, Mike Yard, Jordan Carlos	February 1, 2016	0.541
170	"NAACP Controversy & Iowa Caucus Results"	Lewis Black, Franchesca Ramsey, Rory Albanese	February 2, 2016	0.497
171	"North Korean Satellite & Realistic Barbie"	Wendy Williams, Rory Albanese, Grace Parra	February 3, 2016	0.712
172	"Political Correctness & GOP Candidates"	Paul F. Tompkins, Franchesca Ramsey, Ricky Velez	February 4, 2016	0.554
173	"Eighth GOP Debate & Beyonce Halftime Show"	Keke Palmer, Franchesca Ramsey, Robin Thede	February 8, 2016	0.591
174	"Bill Cosby Drama & 2016 Presidential Race"	Rory Albanese, Mike Yard, Triumph the Insult Comic Dog	February 9, 2016	0.547
175	"New Hampshire Primary & Marley Dias"	T.J. Miller, Grace Parra, Jordan Carlos	February 10, 2016	0.603
Blacklash 2016: the Unblackening – New Hampshire Primary. Keep It 100 – Black History Edition: Paul R. Williams. Marley Dias talks about her #1000BlackGirlBooks campaign. The panelists talk about Donald Trump and Bernie Sanders.
176	"Internet Dating & Online Trolls"	Alexis Ohanian, Grace Parra, Ricky Velez	February 11, 2016	0.442
The Larry People Vs. Flint – Rick Snyder's Image Problem. Keep It 100 – Black History Edition: Lewis and Clark Expedition with Clark's black slave, York. Grace Parra examines online dating preferences with social psychologist Tessa West. The panelists discuss Internet trolling.
177	"Antonin Scalia's Death & Latino Voters"	Jose Antonio Vargas, Grace Parra, Jordan Carlos	February 22, 2016	0.624
Blacklast 2016: The Unblackening – Hispandering at the Nevada Caucus. Jeb's campaign failure and Trump's victory in South Carolina. Keep It 100 – Black History Edition: Onesimus and smallpox inoculation. Mike Yard's The Y Files: Conspiracy about the death of Antonin Scalia. The panelists talk about America's Hispanic voters.
178	"The Pope vs. Zika Virus & Black Voters"	Al Sharpton, Robin Thede, Mike Yard	February 23, 2016	0.548
Blaxploitation: A Democratic Party joint. Keep It 100 – Black History Edition: Willie Thrower, NFL's 1st black quarterback. Pope Francis suggests using contraceptives because of the Zika virus. The panelists talk about issues facing African-American voters.
179	"Bill Nye on Haters & Apple vs. The FBI"	Eddie George, Rory Albanese, Franchesca Ramsey	February 24, 2016	0.572
Apple's refusal to create a backdoor access to an iPhone. Keep It 100 – Black History Edition: Brazil's 5 million slaves. Bill Nye and Larry put the anti-science controversy to rest. The Martian if Mark Watney was black. The panelists talk about Apple's refusal to help the FBI hack a terrorist's phone.
180	"#FlatLarry & Yelp Employee Controversy"	Tom Papa, Mike Yard, Jordan Carlos	February 25, 2016	0.552
A cardboard cutout of Larry is stolen. Mitch McConnell refuses to consider Supreme Court nominees. Keep It 100 – Black History Edition: Carter G. Woodson. The Rosa Parks Awards: Teen posed as a doctor. The panelists talk about an employee's complaint about her low salary and Yelp's harsh response to it.
181	"Plantation Wedding & Hollywood Diversity"	Daveed Diggs, Robin Thede, Holly Walker	February 29, 2016	0.554
FlatLarry's adventures continue. Whoopi is mistaken for Oprah at the Oscars. Donald Trump is ignorant of David Duke and quotes Mussolini. Mike Yard and Robin Thede plan their wedding at Richwood plantation. The panelists examine the effects of the #OscarsSoWhite protests.

=== March ===
No.	Title	Panelists	Original release date	US viewers (millions)
182	"Frat Boy in North Korea & Football Hazards"	Malcolm Gladwell, Mike Yard, Rory Albanese	March 1, 2016	0.498
An American college student detained by North Korea. Larry talks to the student's fraternity brothers. Poll Musicians rhyme to the tune of Ted Cruz. The panelists discuss the health risks of playing football.
183	"Super Tuesday & "Fresh Water for Flint""	Jon Connor, Franchesca Ramsey, Jordan Carlos	March 2, 2016	0.574
Blacklash 2016: Hangover Wednesday – Donald Trump and Hillary Clinton victorious on Super Tuesday. Larry talks to Clinton's aide, Carlos Jordanson. The panelists talk about the Flint water crisis. Rapper Jon Connor and Keke Palmer perform "Fresh Water for Flint".
184	"Mitt Romney vs. Donald Trump & "Nina" Debate"	Michael K. Williams, Franchesca Ramsey, Robin Thede	March 3, 2016	0.566
Blacklash 2016: The Unblackening – Donald Trump and Mitt Romney feuding, Ricky Velez explains. Texas abortion case in Supreme Court, Nightly! Nightly!'s Grace Parra reports. Pardon the Integration: Mike Yard and Rory Albanese debate reparations. The panelists talk about the controversy surrounding Zoe Saldaña's role in Nina.
185	"Confederate Flag Day & #DickJokesMatter"	Dave Attell, Mike Yard, Ricky Velez	March 7, 2016	0.569
Blacklash 2016: The Unblackening – Racism at the Democratic debate. Larry, Dave Attell, Rachel Feinstein and Gilbert Gottfried tell why #DickJokesMatter. Organizers in Gettysburg, PA, celebrate Confederate Flag Day, Mike Yard visits Gettysburg. The panelists discuss civility and authenticity in politics.
186	"2 Chainz Explainz & "Ghostbusters" Blockback"	Cedric the Entertainer, Robin Thede, Rory Albanese	March 8, 2016	0.612
Ben Carson suspends his campaign: 2 Chainz explainz. Critique of Hillary Clinton speaking into a microphone; Walker, Thede, Ramsey and Parra tell why interrupting is bad. Donald Trump (Bob DiBuono) trash talks. The panelists discuss the controversy about Leslie Jones' role in Ghostbusters.
187	"Donald Trump's Protesters & Pander Politics"	Mac Miller, Ricky Velez, Franchesca Ramsey	March 9, 2016	0.548
Blacklash 2016: The Unblackening – Protesters receive rough treatment by Donald Trump supporters. Mac Miller calls Donald Trump a "racist f*ckwad". and an "egomaniacal, attention-thirsty, psychopathic, power-hungry, delusional waste of skin and bones" Mike Yard's The Y Files: Rumor about Ted Cruz being the Zodiac Killer. The panelists examine the art of political pandering.
188	"Harriet Tubman & Kim Kardashian's Selfie"	Peaches, Holly Walker, Grace Parra	March 10, 2016	0.504
Robin Thede finds out that most people don't know anything about Harriet Tubman. Missouri bill lets businesses deny service to gay people: Jesus (Rory Albanese) weighs in. #Hash it Out with Franchesca Ramsey: Involuntary vs. voluntary nudity. The panelists discuss women in the nude and reaction to it.
189	"Violence at Donald Trump Rallies"	Jurnee Smollett-Bell, Mike Yard, Ricky Velez	March 14, 2016	0.597
Blacklash 2016: The Unblackening – Donald Trump accused of inciting violence, Donald Trump (Bob DiBuono) denies. Nightly! Nightly!'s Grace Parra reports on Nancy Reagan's AIDS response. The panelists discuss Donald Trump's violent rallies.
190	"Tampon Tuesday & Donald Trump's Media Savvy"	Jussie Smollett, Franchesca Ramsey, Rory Albanese	March 15, 2016	0.559
Tampon Tuesday: Grace Parra sings and Holly Walker is undercover in a public school with Mike Yard. Robin Thede educates Larry on Black Lady Sign language. The panelists discuss media's relationship with Donald Trump.
191	"A Plus-Size Debate & Candidate Likeability"	Charlamagne Tha God, Jordan Carlos, Grace Parra	March 16, 2016	0.545
Backlash 2016: The Unblackening – Ricky Velez's dolphin watch. Pardon the Integration: Rory Albanese, Mike Yard and Holly Walker debate plus-sized women in lingerie ads. The panelists discuss Donald Trump and Hillary Clinton's likeability.
192	"Food Deserts & Hillary Clinton Faces Sexism"	Joanna Coles, Robin Thede, Mike Yard	March 17, 2016	0.519
2 Chainz explainz what the GOP could face with a brokered convention. GOP refusing to consider Obama's Supreme Court nominee. Jordan Carlos investigates food deserts. The panelists discuss sexism that women in power face.
193	"Obama's Cuba Visit & Hulk Hogan's Legal Win"	Scott Aukerman, Bobby Gaylor, Grace Parra	March 21, 2016	0.582
President Obama's historic visit to Cuba: Nightly! Nightly!'s Grace Parra reports. Larry talks to Trump's black supporters. The panelists discuss Hulk Hogan's $140 million victory against Gawker.
194	"Donald Trump's AIPAC Speech & Social Media"	Jenn McAllister, Franchesca Ramsey, Ricky Velez	March 22, 2016	0.492
Blacklash 2016: Unblackening – Pundits marvel at Donald Trump's teleprompter use in his AIPAC speech: Donald Trump (Bob DiBuono) returns. Tampon Tuesday: Holly Walker warns of the bloodthirsty bears. The panelists weigh in on the effects of the social media.
195	"Brussels Attack & Donald Trump vs. Ted Cruz"	Anthony Hamilton, Mike Yard, Robin Thede	March 23, 2016	0.570
The Brussels terrorist attack sparks a debate about Muslims in the U.S.: Holly Thede explains "black folk co-signing" and "black adjacent". A different kind of radical Muslim Masir Ali (Nemr Abou Nassar) responds to Ted Cruz's comments. The Larry People vs. Flint: A public service announcement by the women of The Nightly Show. The panelists compare Ted Cruz and Donald Trump.
196	"Racist Drug War & Donald Trump Graffiti"	Neal Brennan, Mike Yard, Jordan Carlos	March 24, 2016	0.491
Joe Morton compares Nixon's racist drug policy to what the Trump presidency might look like. Emory University students explain why seeing "Trump" name is assault. The panelists discuss over sensitivity at colleges.

=== April ===
No.	Title	Panelists	Original release date	US viewers (millions)
197	"Mike Epps"	Mike Epps, Rory Albanese, Robin Thede	April 4, 2016	0.562
Mississippi celebrates Confederate Heritage Month. The panelists discuss the race-based casting controversy surrounding "Hamilton".
198	"Bill Nye"	Bill Nye, Jordan Carlos, Grace Parra	April 5, 2016	0.507
The Smithsonian takes heat for including Bill Cosby in an exhibit. Mike Yard's Seven is assembled. White House gets a new phone system: "Obama" calls in to tell about the "amazing" new features. The panelists talk climate change and the 2016 presidential race.
199	"Wendell Pierce"	Wendell Pierce, Mike Yard, Franchesca Ramsey	April 6, 2016	0.534
Antonin Scalia is honored by rebranding a law school as ASSoL. Louisiana man accused of stealing candy and faces 20 years in prison. William Wonka (Jordan Carlos) compares for profit prisons to candy factories. Blacklash 2016: The Unblackening – GOP Wisconsin Primary. 2 Chainz explainz Super PACs. The panelists talk about outsider appeal and Hillary Clinton's unfavourability with women.
200	"Jake Tapper"	Jake Tapper, Holly Walker, Ricky Velez	April 7, 2016	0.527
70s-era Soul Daddy comments on the news in 2016 America. Pardon the Integration: Mike Yard and Rory Albanese debate whether America is ready for a female president. The panelists with Soul Daddy talk about Hillary Clinton, Tinder and minimum wage.
201	"Waka Flocka Flame"	Waka Flocka Flame, Mike Yard, Robin Thede	April 11, 2016	0.538
Blacklash 2016: Hill Bill Edition. Tell the Truth with Mike Yard. Nightly! Nightly!'s Grace Parra's in-depth look at the Panama Papers. The panelists discuss Bill Clinton's controversial defense of his 1994 crime bill.
202	"Quinta Brunson"	Quinta Brunson, Rory Albanese, Franchesca Ramsey	April 12, 2016	0.530
Blacklash 2016: The Unblackening – Donald Trump's Campaign Manager's "Gestapo tactics" accusation. "Donald Trump" (Bob Dibuono) returns. #Hash it Out with Franchesca Ramsey: False equivalences. The panelists talk about Hillary Clinton's "CP time" joke and who is an underdog.
203	"Bernie Sanders"	Bernie Sanders	April 13, 2016	0.488
Stephen Hawking's plan with a Russian billionaire to send tiny spacecrafts to Alpha Centauri. Bernie Sanders tells Ted Cruz about "New York values". He also joins Larry to discuss his primary election prospects, the Flint water crisis and his proposal to break up the banks.
204	"Bassem Youssef"	Bassem Youssef, Ricky Velez, Jordan Carlos	April 14, 2016	0.552
Ted Cruz's proposed ban on dildos. Bono's suggestion to send comedians to battle ISIS: Gilbert Gottfried takes his call to action literally. Ice Cube and Common talk with Larry about racism, the police and snitching. The panelists discuss whether satire can help battle extremism.
205	"Terry Crews"	Terry Crews, Holly Walker, Grace Parra	April 18, 2016	0.534
Sarah Palin discredits Bill Nye and the consensus on climate change. Difficulties in getting a woman on a bill; Harriet Tubman (Holly Walker) is not happy. Black people undertreated for pain; Mike Yard's The Y Files: Denzel Washington's to blame. The panelists discuss honoring women and the men that are currently on the bills.
206	"Tony Hale"	Tony Hale, Ricky Velez, Franchesca Ramsey	April 19, 2016	0.533
Blacklash 2016: Pandering Edition – New York Primaries. Bill O'Reilly upset by the reaction to his racist comments. The panelists examine political pandering.
207	"Susan Sarandon"	Susan Sarandon, Mike Yard, Rory Albanese	April 20, 2016	0.521
Blacklash 2016: The Unblackening. Lady Time with Holly Walker – New Jersey considers treating menstrual cramps with marijuana. The panelists discuss the appeal of Hillary Clinton with Bernie Sanders' supporters and the interest in getting the best people outside the system into politics.
208	"Russell Simmons"	Russell Simmons, Robin Thede, Jordan Carlos	April 21, 2016	0.517
Cleaning Up Dirty States – Justice in Flint; Utah fights pornography but ignores a rise in STDs; Two Utah residents (Rory Albanese & Mike Yard) are on a mission to confiscate porn. Racist Promposals: An interracial couple explains. The panelists discuss Prince.
209	"Grace Helbig"	Grace Helbig, Mike Yard, Grace Parra	April 25, 2016	0.541
The Larry People vs. Flint – Rick Snyder Taps out. Blacklash 2016: The Unblackening – Donald Trump (Bob Dibuono) talks being presidential. Dr. Mona Hanna-Attisha talks about her efforts during the Flint water crisis. The panelists discuss an all-woman presidential ticket.
210	"Matt McGorry"	Matt McGorry, Jordan Carlos, Robin Thede	April 26, 2016	0.471
The U.S. deploys 250 troops to Syria: A Pentagon official (Jordan Carlos) explains. Nightly! Nightly!'s Grace Parra reports from London. The panelists discuss President Obama's criticism of Black Lives Matter activists.
211	"Chris Jackson"	Chris Jackson, Ricky Velez, Franchesca Ramsey	April 27, 2016	0.554
Blacklash 2016: The Unblackening – Ted Cruz picks a running mate; CNN News Consultant (Rory Albanese) is excited about CNN's gimmicks. #Hash it Out with Franchesca Ramsey: Piers Morgan's critique of Beyoncé being political. The panelists discuss Beyoncé being black, artists being political and having an influence.
212	"Bakari Sellers"	Bakari Sellers	April 28, 2016	0.519
Dennis Hastert's lenient prison sentence. Larry is given advice for the White House Correspondents' Dinner by some famous people. The panelists talk about the bar being set low for Donald Trump and Hillary Clinton debating with Trump.

=== May ===
No.	Title	Panelists	Original release date	US viewers (millions)
213	"Riki Lindhome"	Riki Lindhome, Rory Albanese, Grace Parra	May 2, 2016	0.640
Response to Larry's White House Correspondents' Dinner speech. Blacklash 2016: The Unblackening – Donald Trump's offensive remarks; Donald Trump (Bob Dibuono) is proud of Larry and thinks they are alike. #Hash it Out with Franchesca Ramsey: Ghostbusters' sexist backlash. The panelists talk about playing the women's card.
214	"Quinta Brunson"	Quinta Brunson, Mike Yard, Robin Thede	May 3, 2016	0.651
Kenneth Bae gives Dennis Rodman credit for his release from North Korea: "Rodman" (Jordan Carlos) explains his methods. Pardon the Integration – Mike Yard and Rory Albanese debate whether voter ID laws are racist. The panelists talk about President Obama's perception problem.
215	"Meghan Markle"	Meghan Markle, Ricky Velez, Franchesca Ramsey	May 4, 2016	0.599
Blacklash 2016: The Unblackening – Ted Cruz drops out; Cruz-Fiorina strategist tells about their campaign. Black Magic – Eric Jones explains Donald Trump. The panelists discuss how to stop Donald Trump, who is going to support Trump and whether Bernie supporters would vote for Hillary.
216	"Ken Burns"	Ken Burns, Holly Walker, Mike Yard	May 5, 2016	0.454
Larry and Donald Trump celebrate Cinco de Mayo, and President Obama visits Flint, MI. America's failing schools. Georgetown University's legacy of slavery: Felonious Munk weighs in. The panelists discuss why there are now less black Major League Baseball players, baseball being expensive for kids and why people enjoy baseball.
217	"Aida Rodriguez"	Aida Rodriguez, Franchesca Ramsey, Mike Yard	May 9, 2016	0.478
President Obama's speech at Howard University. Blacklash 2016: The Unblackening – Donald Trump blames Hillary Clinton for enabling her husband's affairs, Donald Trump (Bob Dibuono) explains. Resistant Strain (Robin Thede) and Antibiotic (Jordan Carlos) argue. The panelists examine racial progress in America.
218	"Lecrae"	Lecrae, Holly Walker, Ricky Velez	May 10, 2016	0.499
Controversy with black women's raised fists at West Point: Two graduates (Holly Walker & Franchesca Ramsey) explain. China's sexist policy: Grace Parra tries to make a point by non-sexually eating a banana, but Nightly Show resident pervert (Rory Albanese) shows up. The panelists discuss the West Point photo: were the cadents making a political statement and who is to blame for the controversy.
219	"Angie Martinez"	Angie Martinez, Rory Albanese, Grace Parra	May 11, 2016	0.528
Heidi Cruz's slavery comparison. Suppression of conservative speech. Lady Time with Holly Walker: Congress investigates the underreporting of sex abuse in the military. The panelists talk about Facebook's alleged liberal bias, jews getting blamed, getting news from social media and trusting Facebook.
220	"Audra McDonald"	Audra McDonald, Robin Thede, Jordan Carlos	May 12, 2016	0.513
Salute to losing the word "Oriental". George Zimmerman's gun auction: Satan (Rory Albanese), Idi Amin (Mike Yard) and Adolf Hitler (Tom Ruprecht) explain the reaction from hell. Blacklash 2016: The Unblackening – Bernie Sanders refuses to drop out: Carlos Jordanson (Jordan Carlos) sells Hillary Clinton as an underdog. The panelists discuss Zimmerman vs. potential buyers, why is he allowed to have a gun, strange fetishes, Trayvon Martin's parents' suffering, double standards when the victim is black and Florida.
221	"Paul F. Tompkins"	Paul F. Tompkins, Mike Yard, Robin Thede	May 16, 2016	0.572
Blacklash 2016: The Unblackening – Women speak out against Donald Trump; Trump impersonating a fictional publicist; Donald Trump (Bob Dibuono) and Larry have an impression-off. The Richardsons (Rory Albanese, Grace Parra & Ricky Velez) camping at New York City's Stonewall Inn, a landmark for gay rights. The panelists talk why Trump's treatment of women or his lying might not make a difference in the election, values of his supporters and Trump getting away with things because he's rich.
222	"Lewis Black"	Lewis Black, Jordan Carlos, Grace Parra	May 17, 2016	0.547
America's first penis transplant: Rory peer pressured into getting a new dick. CIA's lost torture report. Super Depressing Deep Dive: Lead poisoning crisis. The panelists discuss our relationship with the Clintons, Bill Clinton's role in the White House and in Hillary's campaign.
223	"Anthony Anderson"	Anthony Anderson, Holly Walker, Ricky Velez	May 18, 2016	0.513
Blacklash 2016: The Unblackening – Megyn Kelly's softball questions at Donald Trump. Mike Yard's Racial Sensitivity Class. The panelists discuss a controversy surrounding NBA's Steven Adams' "Little Monkeys" comment.
224	"Paul Scheer"	Paul Scheer, Ricky Velez, Mike Yard	May 19, 2016	0.488
Larry's Dank News Stash – Marijuana in America; Pueblo County Comptroller (Ricky Velez) explains how weed tax money is used. Desegregation in Mississippi. The panelists discuss America's relationship with marijuana.
225	"Jen Bartels"	Jen Bartels, Rory Albanese, Grace Parra	May 23, 2016	0.503
Rory's Local News Screw-Ups ends quickly. Blacklash 2016: The Unblackening – Donald Trump (Bob Dibuono) addresses his ever-changing stance on guns and introduces Trump guns. Robin & Holly's That's What She Said Award to Rep. Julie Stokes. The panelists discuss whether to legalize or decriminalize prostitution, is it becoming more acceptable and how they feel about it if their family member decides to do it.
226	"Esperanza Spalding"	Esperanza Spalding, Robin Thede, Mike Yard	May 24, 2016	0.539
No beards at Louisiana high school's graduation. Bill Cosby update. Pardon the Integration: Mike Yard and Rory Albanese debate whether Washington Redskins name should be changed. The panelists discuss who decides whether a word is ok, Phoenix Suns' mascot, and who names the teams.
227	"Arianna Huffington"	Arianna Huffington, Ricky Velez, Franchesca Ramsey	May 25, 2016	0.551
Reply tweet to Donald Trump appearing on CNN. Larry Does Lines: TSA Agent/Producer Thursday (Mike Yard) explains their long lines, why they are not good with security and shows his all-star lineup; Larry talks to two Army veterans (Jonathan Ginter & Benari Poulten) about their experience seeking health care from the VA. The panelists discuss a decline of conservative speakers at colleges.
228	"LeVar Burton"	LeVar Burton, Holly Walker, Jordan Carlos	May 26, 2016	0.440
Blacklash 2016: The Unblackening – Larry drinks Trump vodka; Trump's press conference; Clinton's email practices, explained by a Clinton campaign aide (Jordan Carlos). Mike Yard's The Y Files – Angry Birds is secretly about black people. The panelists examine the legacy of Roots (1977 miniseries) and the value of the reboot. Lewis Black asks Larry a Keep It 100 question.

=== June ===
No.	Title	Panelists	Original release date	US viewers (millions)
229	"Mychal Denzel Smith"	Mychal Denzel Smith, Mike Yard, Robin Thede	June 13, 2016	0.500
Donald Trump's comments about Orlando nightclub shooting; Larry calls the president (Jordan Carlos). Nightly! Nightly!'s Grace Parra addresses Beyoncé's sweatshop scandal. The panelists examine guns, religion and homophobia in light of the recent mass shooting in Orlando, FL.
230	"Malcolm Gladwell"	Malcolm Gladwell, Rory Albanese, Franchesca Ramsey	June 14, 2016	0.502
Draymond Green's suspension. Brock Turner's lenient sentence for sexual assault. Larry talks to two cookie debt collectors (Mike Yard & Holly Walker). The panelists talk about the O.J. Simpson trial, and American perspectives on race, fame and domestic violence during the trial and now.
231	"Timothy Simons"	Timothy Simons, Ricky Velez, Grace Parra	June 15, 2016	0.552
President Obama critiques GOP's and Donald Trump's Islamophobic rhetoric; Trump (Bob Dibuono) responds. Anderson Cooper's questioning of Florida Attorney General's past LGBT support. The panelists discuss whether Congress would ever do anything about guns and enabling gun violence.
232	"Anika Noni Rose"	Anika Noni Rose, Franchesca Ramsey, Holly Walker	June 16, 2016	0.489
Gretchen Carlson, Clinton and Trump all agreeing on guns; Dirk McDermond (Rory Albanese) talks about lists. Felonious Munk examines the term "radical Islamic terrorism". The panelists talk about feminism for women of color, angry woman label, and having a woman as president.
233	"Tom Papa"	Tom Papa, Jordan Carlos, Grace Parra	June 20, 2016	0.553
Blacklash 2016: The Unblackening – Republican insider, Mr. X (Rick Crom), talks about a replacement RNC candidate. Larry talks to a Tennessee congressman's event organizer (Rory Albanese) during his AR-15 raffle. The panelists examine Donald Trump's struggling presidential campaign.
234	"Adrienne C. Moore"	Adrienne C. Moore, Rory Albanese, Robin Thede	June 21, 2016	0.503
Do-Nothing Congress Doing Nothing Watch 2016: Gun control gridlock; Mike Yard talks about the intensity gap. Oakland's police scandal and their changing chiefs (Albanese, Carlos & Thede). The panelists talk about a bill that would require women to register for the draft and whether military service should be obligatory. Paul Scheer asks Larry a Keep It 100 question.
235	"M1"	M1, Mike Yard, Holly Walker	June 22, 2016	0.520
Blacklash 2016: The Unblackening – Donald Trump (Bob Dibuono) explains his presidential campaign finances. Mike Yard's The Y Files: NBA finals is a GOP conspiracy. The panelists talk about what could help in preventing gun violence in poor black communities and our fascination with guns.
236	"Arsenio Hall"	Arsenio Hall, Mike Yard, Robin Thede	June 23, 2016	0.552
House Democrats' sit-in protest; The History of Sitting with Holly Walker and two cavemen (Rory Albanese & Jordan Carlos). Robin Thede asks Who Dis? about Rep. Steve King. The panelists question the sincerity of Donald Trump's presidential run.
237	"Joanna Coles"	Joanna Coles, Rory Albanese, Mike Yard	June 27, 2016	0.635
British chimney sweep (Jordan Carlos) explains the Brexit. Pardon the Integration – Mike Yard & Rory Albanese debate the fairness of the no-fly list. The panelists examine the reasons for the Brexit vote, its consequences, and Mike Yard tells what happened when he was in Britain.
238	"Jaime Camil"	Jaime Camil, Jordan Carlos, Franchesca Ramsey	June 28, 2016	0.544
Elizabeth Warren campaigns for Hillary Clinton: In Robin's Moment about upstaging she's getting upstaged (by Holly); Larry trusts Ricky to check the Benghazi report; Red Cross's seemingly racist poster: The artist (Rory Albanese) shows his other paintings. The panelists examine Elizabeth Warren's backing of Hillary Clinton and the potential running mates of the candidates.
239	"Vic Mensa"	Vic Mensa, Rory Albanese, Robin Thede	June 29, 2016	0.597
Trending hashtags. Popelash 2016: The UnPopening – Changing Catholic tone vs. Bill Donohue; Larry talks to a Vatican P.R. Liaison (Jordan Carlos), and Pope's in-flight announcements are shown. #Hash It Out with Franchesca Ramsey: stunned take on Kanye West's "Famous" video. The panelists discuss cultural appropriation and the harsh reaction to the Justin Timberlake's tweet.
240	"Diane Guerrero"	Diane Guerrero, Ricky Velez, Holly Walker	June 30, 2016	0.619
Mike Yard on the secret meaning of the North American leaders' awkward handshake. Blacklash 2016: The Unblackening – Nate Silver's Donald Trump predictions; Donald Trump (Bob Dibuono) explains ways he tortures. Soul Daddy's 1976 4th of July celebration with "Ted Lange" (Jordan Carlos). The panelists discuss national security's importance in the election.

=== July ===
No.	Title	Panelists	Original release date	US viewers (millions)
241	"Michael Ian Black"	Michael Ian Black, Grace Parra, Ricky Velez	July 5, 2016	0.568
Blacklash 2016: The Unblackening – FBI's email probe concludes. Larry talks to Clippy, a retired Microsoft office assistant (Rory Albanese) about Donald Trump. Nightly! Nightly!'s Grace Parra reports about Jack Daniel's slavery roots. The panelists discuss Bill Clinton's meeting with Loretta Lynch.
242	"Bassem Youssef"	Bassem Youssef, Rory Albanese, Mike Yard	July 6, 2016	0.582
Morning Joe compares Hillary's version of her email scandal to FBI's conclusions. Barack Obama campaigns for Hillary Clinton. Larry calls the President (Jordan Carlos). The panelists discuss Clinton's email scandal's impact to her presidential bid. Larry talks about the reaction to the death of Alton Sterling.
243	"Xiuhtezcatl Martinez"	Xiuhtezcatl Martinez, Franchesca Ramsey, Jordan Carlos	July 7, 2016	0.550
Gretchen Carlson suing Fox News's CEO for harassment. Rio's health concerns and violent crime: Dennis Rodman (Jordan Carlos) reports. #Hash It Out with Franchesca Ramsey: Petition to fire Jesse Williams. The panelists discuss an empathy gap, tragedy porn in the social media, intersectionality in the movements, and being solution orientated. Anthony Anderson asks Larry a Keep It 100 question.
244	"John Fetterman"	John Fetterman, Rory Albanese, Robin Thede	July 19, 2016	0.733
Blacklash 2016: The Unblackening – America's Last Election; Trump Campaign Spokesperson (Rory Albanese) blames Melania's speech on "looping"; Call for a brief open-carry gun ban in Cleveland. Grace Parra and Jordan Carlos in conventions. The panelists discuss Melania Trump's plagiarism controversy.
245	"DeRay Mckesson"	DeRay Mckesson, Holly Walker, Mike Yard	July 20, 2016	0.578
Roger Ailes and sexual harassment; Robin & Holly's That's What She Said Award to women of Fox News. Blacklash 2016: The Unblackening – America's Last Election – Sheriff David Clarke saying "blue lives matter". Mike Yard's The Y Files – Pokémon Go conspiracy. The panelists examine criticism of the Black Lives Matter movement.
246	"Salman Rushdie"	Salman Rushdie, Jordan Carlos, Grace Parra	July 21, 2016	0.603
Blacklash 2016: The Unblackening – America's Last Election; Contributors explain what Mike Pence thought when Trump tried to kiss him; Response to Ted Cruz's speech. A restaurant owner (Rory Albanese) changes their "Black Olives Matter" sign. Charles Kinsey shooting. The panelists discuss Cruz's refusal to endorse Trump, the Trump family, and Trump being stupid.
247	"Nina Turner"	Nina Turner, Ricky Velez, Franchesca Ramsey	July 22, 2016	0.437
Blacklash 2016: The Unblackening – America's Last Election; The Nightly Show Presents: Backstage with Donald (Bob Dibuono). The panelists discuss Trump's speech and why people liked it. Rapper YG featuring Nipsey Hussle perform "F**k Donald Trump".
248	"Wyclef Jean"	Wyclef Jean, Jordan Carlos, Franchesca Ramsey	July 26, 2016	0.590
249	"Eliana Johnson"	Eliana Johnson, Robin Thede, Mike Yard	July 27, 2016	0.540
250	"Cass Sunstein"	Cass Sunstein, Grace Parra, Ricky Velez	July 28, 2016	0.366
251	"Gary Johnson"	Gary Johnson	July 29, 2016	0.409

=== August ===
No.	Title	Panelists	Original release date	US viewers (millions)
252	"DJ Drama"	DJ Drama, Mike Yard, Robin Thede	August 8, 2016	0.506
253	"Abdullah Saeed"	Abdullah Saeed, Holly Walker, Franchesca Ramsey	August 9, 2016	0.422
254	"Deshauna Barber"	Deshauna Barber, Jordan Carlos, Grace Parra	August 10, 2016	0.508
255	"Ana Marie Cox"	Ana Marie Cox, Ricky Velez, Rory Albanese	August 11, 2016	0.436
256	"Julie Klausner"	Julie Klausner, Robin Thede, Mike Yard	August 15, 2016	0.665
Larry talks about the show's cancellation. Blacklash 2016: The Unblackening - America's Last Election. Pardon the Integration - Mike Yard and Rory Albanese argue about the N-word. The panelists examine Donald Trump's electoral battle against Hillary Clinton.
257	"Quinta Brunson"	Quinta Brunson, Holly Walker, Franchesca Ramsey	August 16, 2016	0.625
258	"Lewis Black"	Lewis Black, Rory Albanese, Ricky Velez	August 17, 2016	0.600
259	"Jon Stewart"	Robin Thede, Rory Albanese, Holly Walker, Jordan Carlos, Grace Parra, Franchesca Ramsey	August 18, 2016	0.625
Larry talks about the gifts he received from other talk show teams. Jon Stewart appears to congratulate Larry for his work. The contributors gather together and share memories of working on the show. Larry thanks his fans and everyone responsible for the series and Keeps it 100 by assuring people that his career will continue. Note: Alison Stewart was originally slated to appear.
