= Marina Franklin =

American comedian and actress

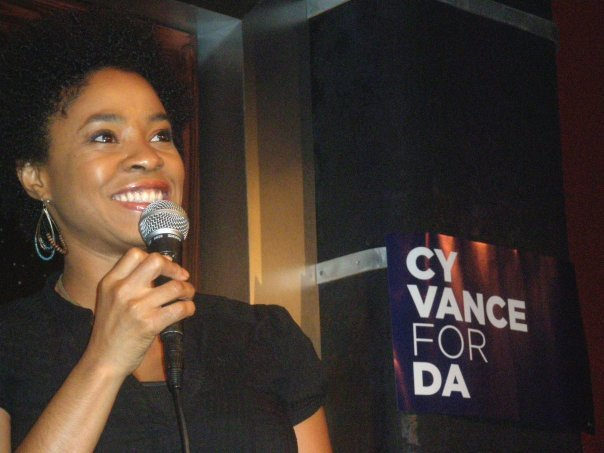
- Born: Circa December 25, 1970; Chicago, Illinois, U.S.
- Occupations: Comedian; actress; podcast host; writer

Marina Franklin is an American stand-up comedian, actress and podcast host, based in New York City. She is best known for her work on, Single Black Female (comedy special) and Hysterical on FX on Hulu. She also hosts her own podcast Friends Like Us.

== Life and career ==
Franklin was born in Chicago, Illinois. She graduated from the University of Illinois at Urbana–Champaign and Syracuse University. Her film and television credits include Crashing, Trainwreck, The Late Show with Stephen Colbert, The Nightly Show with Larry Wilmore and appeared on Conan O'Brien's tour and worked with him on his shows for Comic-Con in San Diego. She was a staff writer for the HBO comedy series Divorce.

== Filmography ==
=== Film ===
Year	Title	Role	Notes
2010	Sexcut	Mikaela	Short film
2013	Spirit Cabinet	Marina	
2013	Gaffigan	Janelle	TV movie
2015	Trainwreck	Woman in Back of Theater	

=== Television ===
Year	Title	Role	Notes
2004	Best Week Ever	Herself	
2004	Chappelle's Show	Girl Insulting Calvin	
2004	Last Comic Standing	Herself	
2004	Tough Crowd with Colin Quinn	Herself	
2005	Premium Blend	Herself	
2009	Black to the Future	Herself	
2009	The Jay Leno Show	Herself	2 episodes
2009-13	Comics Unleashed	Herself	3 episodes
2010	The Awkward Comedy Show	Herself	
2011	John Oliver's New York Stand-Up Show	Herself	2 episodes
2011	The Late Late Show with Craig Ferguson	Herself	Episode: "7.215"
2013	Women Who Kill	Herself	TV special
2013	Why Do Guys	Herself	
2013	Wanda Sykes Presents Herlarious	Herself	
2014	Inside Amy Schumer - The Nurses	Phone operator	3 episodes
2014	Women Aren't Funny	Herself	
2014	@midnight	Herself	Episode: "2.117"
2015	The Jim Gaffigan Show	Janelle	3 episodes
2015	The Nightly Show with Larry Wilmore	Herself	3 episodes
2015	Louie	Comedy Cellar MC	
2015	Conan's Comic-Con	Herself	
2016	Horace and Pete	Marina	Episode: "1.10"
2016	Just for Laughs Starring Howie Mandel	Herself	
2016	Windy City Live	Herself	
2016	The Late Show with Stephen Colbert	Herself	
2017	Crashing	Comedian	
2018	Night Train with Wyatt Cenac	Herself	
2018	The Break with Michelle Wolf	Herself	
2019	Marina Franklin: Single Black Female	Herself	
2019	Wanda Sykes: Bustin' Loose	Herself	
2020	Tournament of Laughs	Herself	
2020	Jonathan Van Ness: Kicks	Herself	
2020	Colin Quinn & Friends: A Parking Lot Comedy Show	Herself	TV special
2020	Expecting Amy	Herself	3 episodes
2021	Patrice O'Neal: Killing Is Easy	Herself	
2021	Hysterical	Herself	

Podcasts and radio

- WTF with Marc Maron
- You Made It Weird with Pete Holmes
- A Prairie Home Companion
- Wait Wait... Don't Tell Me!
- The JTrain Podcast
- Friends Like Us
