= List of The Nightly Show with Larry Wilmore episodes =

The Nightly Show with Larry Wilmore is an American late-night panel talk show hosted by Larry Wilmore. It premiered on January 19, 2015 on Comedy Central. It aired Mondays through Thursdays at 11:30 PM (EST) following The Daily Show. The show featured Wilmore's scripted take on the news, followed by a panel discussion and later a game with his guests. The series ended on August 18, 2016, with a total of 259 episodes.
