= Panel discussion =

Group of people gathered to discuss a topic in front of an audience

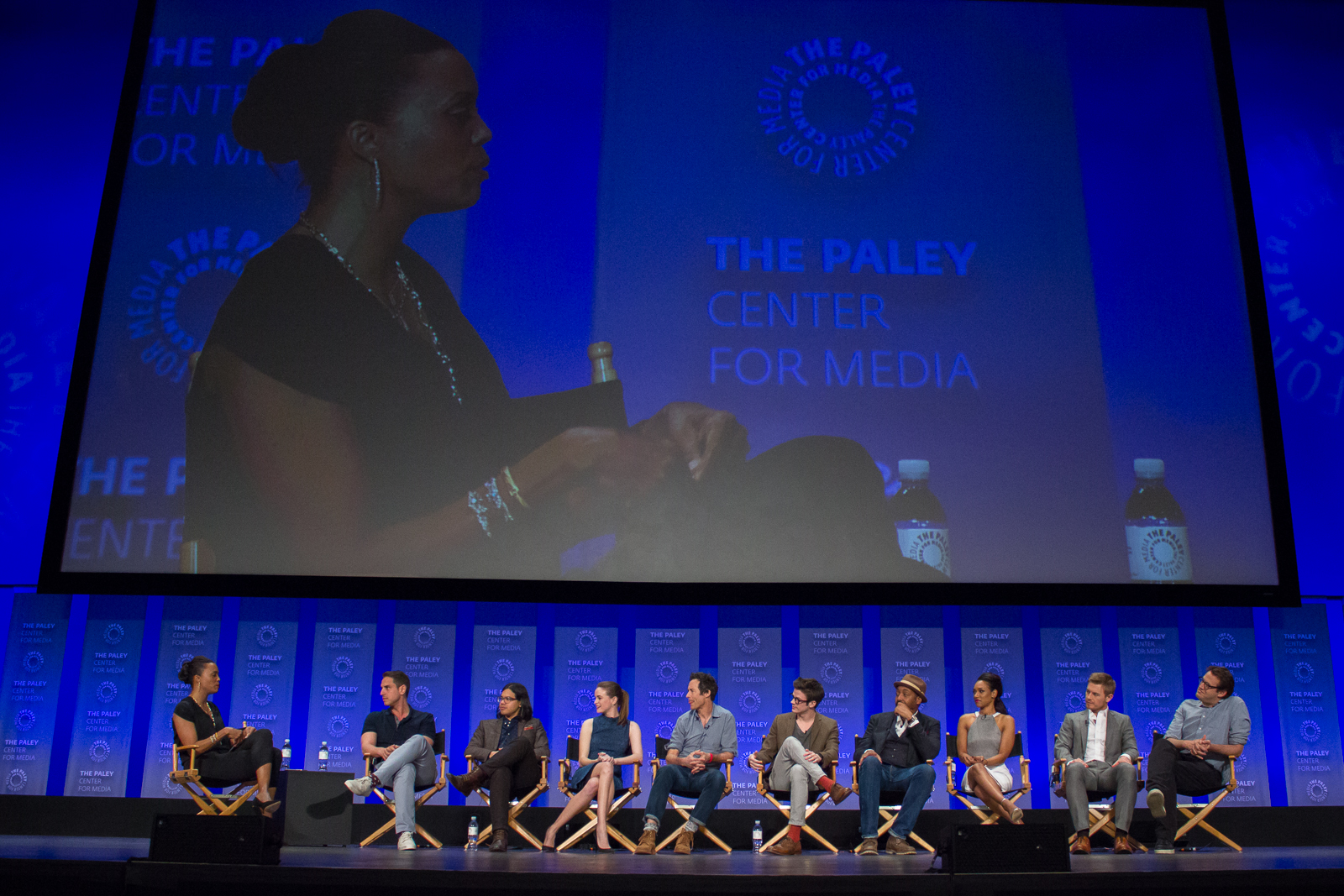
Panel with the cast of The Flash at 2015 PaleyFest

A panel discussion, or simply a panel, involves a group of people gathered to discuss a topic in front of an audience, typically at scientific, business, or academic conferences, fan conventions, and on television shows. Panels usually include a moderator who guides the discussion and sometimes elicits audience questions, with the goal of being informative and entertaining.

Harry A. Overstreet, an American educator, coined the term "panel discussion" in a short article "On the Panel" published in the October, 1934 issue of The Trained Nurse and Hospital Review. In essence, Overstreet envisioned the panel as a "glorified conversation [with] all the delight of generous give-and-take. And if it is a genuinely good conversation, it sends people away with a warm feeling not only that their own ideas have been clarified but that their understanding of other points of view has been broadened." In that article, he emphasized "that no one, under any circumstances, is to rise and make a speech. To do so, he indicates, will be the one unforgivable offense."

A panel discussion is a specific format used in a meeting, conference, or convention. It is a live (or recorded), in-person, virtual, or "hybrid" discussion about a specific topic amongst a selected group of experts who share differing perspectives in front of an in-person, virtual, or geographically dispersed audience.

== Serving as a Panelist ==
The main purpose of a panel discussion is for the panelists to share their wisdom and provide insights to create real value and takeaways for the audience. It's an "up close and personal" discussion among the panelists and with the audience. It's the part of the story that you can't find on Google, YouTube, or TED. Serving as an expert panelist is an honor and a method for showcasing an individual's expertise beyond their traditional network. A successful panelist should concisely communicate key points to the proposed questions or discussion topics in a manner that amplifies others and contributes to a collaborative session.

Film panels at fan conventions have been credited with boosting box office returns by generating advance buzz.

While you may be asked to prepare some initial remarks, there is more to being a strong, engaging panelist than just showing up and presenting your wisdom. You may or may not know your fellow panelists, the questions in advance, or the direction of the conversation. Knowing that your reputation or your company's is on the line, it is worth taking the time to prepare to be a powerful panelist.

== Format ==
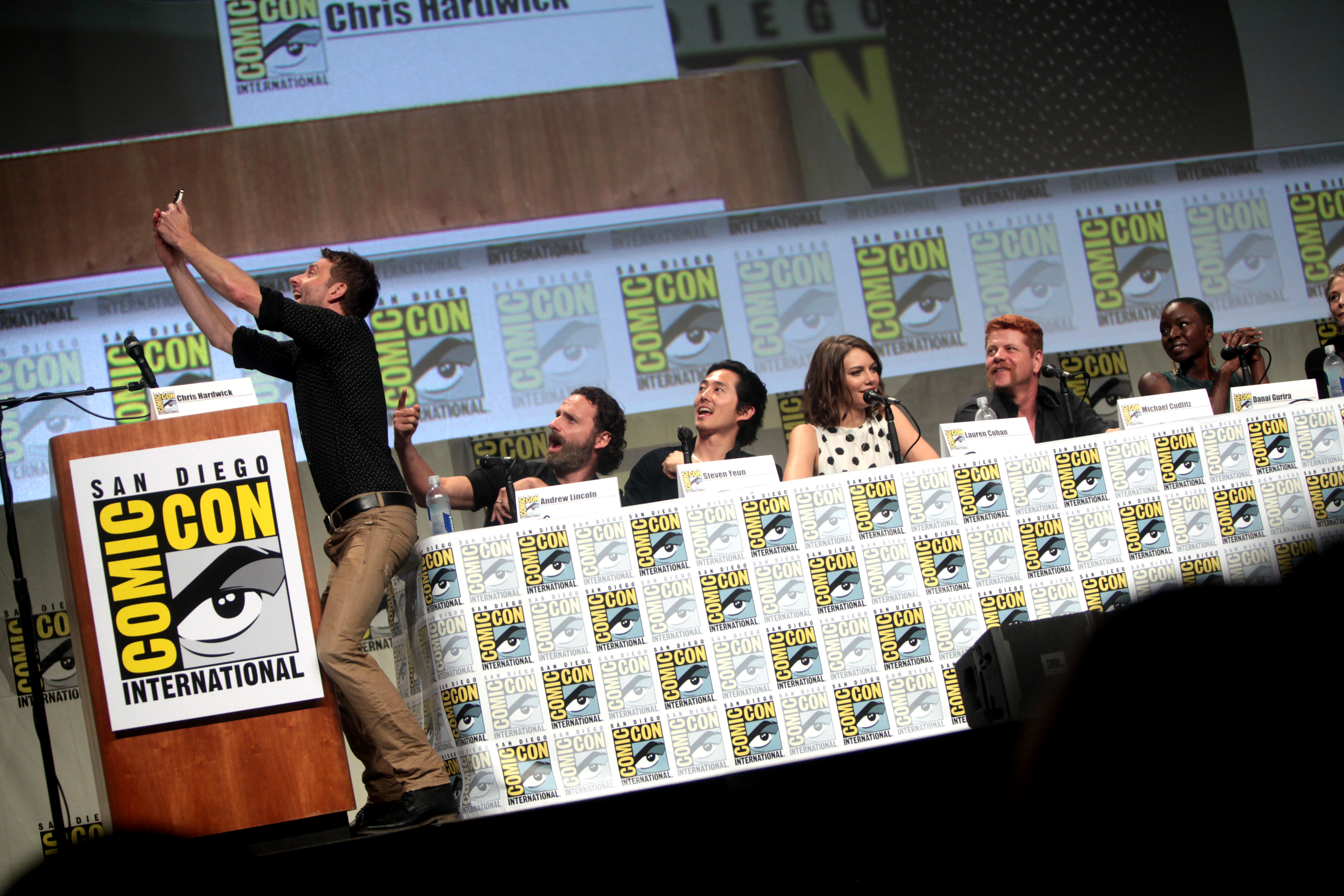
The Walking Dead panel host Chris Hardwick takes a photo with actors Andrew Lincoln, Steven Yeun, Lauren Cohan, Michael Cudlitz, and Danai Gurira at the 2014 Comic-Con.

The typical format for a discussion panel includes a moderator in front of an audience. Kristin Arnold, MBA, CPF, CSP thinks panels should be more inspired. She offers the following 10 Tips to Improve Panel Discussions.

Television shows in the English-speaking world that feature a discussion panel format include Real Time with Bill Maher, Loose Women, The Nightly Show with Larry Wilmore, as well as segments of the long-running Meet the Press. Quiz shows featuring this format, such as QI and Never Mind the Buzzcocks, are called panel games.

== Fan conventions ==
Panels at sci-fi fan conventions, such as San Diego Comic-Con and New York Comic Con, have become increasingly popular; there are typically long lines to get access to the panels. The panels often feature advance looks at upcoming films and video games. Panels and the early screenings at conventions have been credited as increasing the popularity of blockbuster films in recent years.

One of the earliest film panels was at the 1976 San Diego Comic-Con, when publicist Charles Lippincott hosted a slideshow—in front of a "somewhat skeptical" audience—for an upcoming film called Star Wars. Five years later, the Blade Runner panel at the 1981 San Diego Comic-Con featured a film featurette, before featurettes were popular. At the 2000 event, The Lord of the Rings: The Fellowship of the Ring preview panel ushered in today's era of hugely popular panels.

== Manels ==
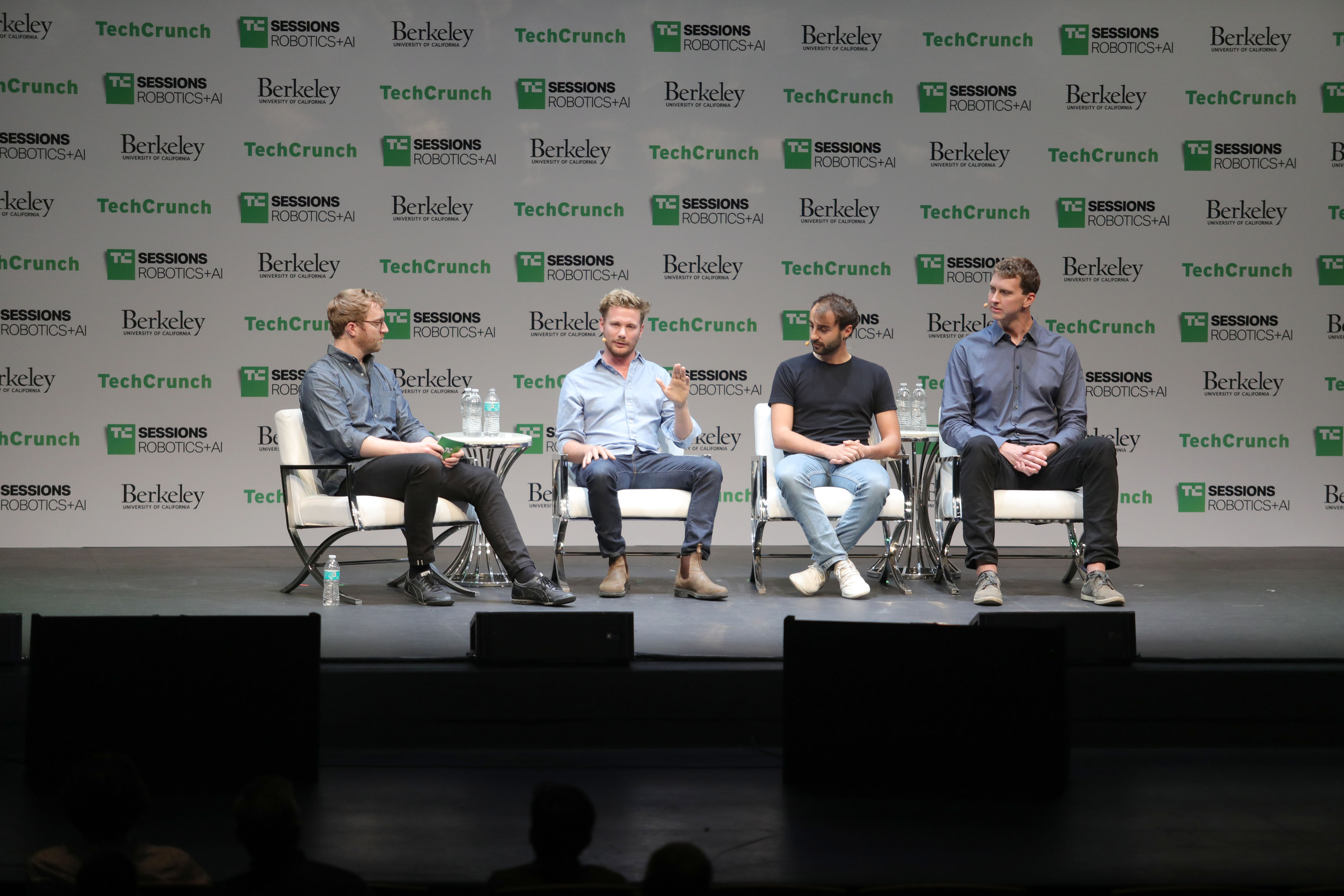
An all-male technology panel in 2020

A manel is a panel whose participants are all men. The term is a portmanteau word deriving from the man and panel. The Oxford Dictionaries and Cambridge Dictionaries teams both published blog posts on the word in 2017, suggesting the term was new at that time. In the second decade of the twenty-first century, such panels, in academia, the private sector, the media, government, and beyond, became the object of feminist critique and of extensive media discussion, as well as academic research. Commentators challenged conference organizers and speakers to refuse to present manels. Organisations responding included The Financial Times, whose board decided in August 2017 to end men-only conference panels, and encouraged its journalists not to participate in these elsewhere.

== See also ==
- News conference
