= Grace Parra =

American screenwriter and presenter

- Born: June 27, 1984 (age 42); Houston, Texas, U.S.
- Education: Columbia University
- Occupations: screenwriter; presenter; actress
- Political party: Democratic
- Spouse: Niall Janney (m. 2020)
- Children: 1

Grace Parra Janney (born June 27, 1984) is an American screenwriter, presenter, and actress who was a contributor on The Nightly Show with Larry Wilmore.

== Career ==
Born in Houston, Texas, she moved to New York City to attend Columbia University, and graduated in 2006. She was a member of the Varsity Show, where her castmates included Kate McKinnon and Jenny Slate. She began her writing career as part of NBC's Writers on the Verge Program, and has contributed to McSweeney's Internet Tendency. She is the creator, writer, and co-host of The Really Late Morning Show, a live comedy talk show in Hollywood featuring celebrity interviews, sketches, and musical guests. Parra is the writer and host of Grace Parra 360, a web series focused on political satire, and Parra of Your World, in which she humorously covers expos, conventions, and other events across the country.

She co-hosted Fuse TV's late-night talk show, White Guy* Talk Show, alongside Saurin Choksi before joining The Nightly Show with Larry Wilmore as a contributor in November 2015. In 2017, she was part of creating a pilot pitched to TBS for a political satire called Beyond the Wall with Grace Parra; the show was not picked up.

She is also a writer and producer of Hulu's Solar Opposites. In July 2021, it is reported that Parra, Josh Bycel, and Eva Longoria have teamed up to develop a half-hour Mexican American family comedy series for ABC Network. The show is inspired by Parra's own upbringing in a large Mexican American family.

== Personal life ==
She is of Mexican American descent.

Parra married her husband Niall Janney in October 2020.

== Filmography ==
Writer

- Broke
- Glory Daze
- Jonas
- Solar Opposites
- Star Trek: Lower Decks

Performer

- Late Night with Conan O'Brien
- The Bonnie Hunt Show

Actress

- BoJack Horseman
- Broken
- How I Met Your Mother
- Master of None
- Superstore
- The Nightly Show with Larry Wilmore
- Zeke and Luther
