= Franchesca Ramsey =

American comedian, activist, and television and YouTube personality

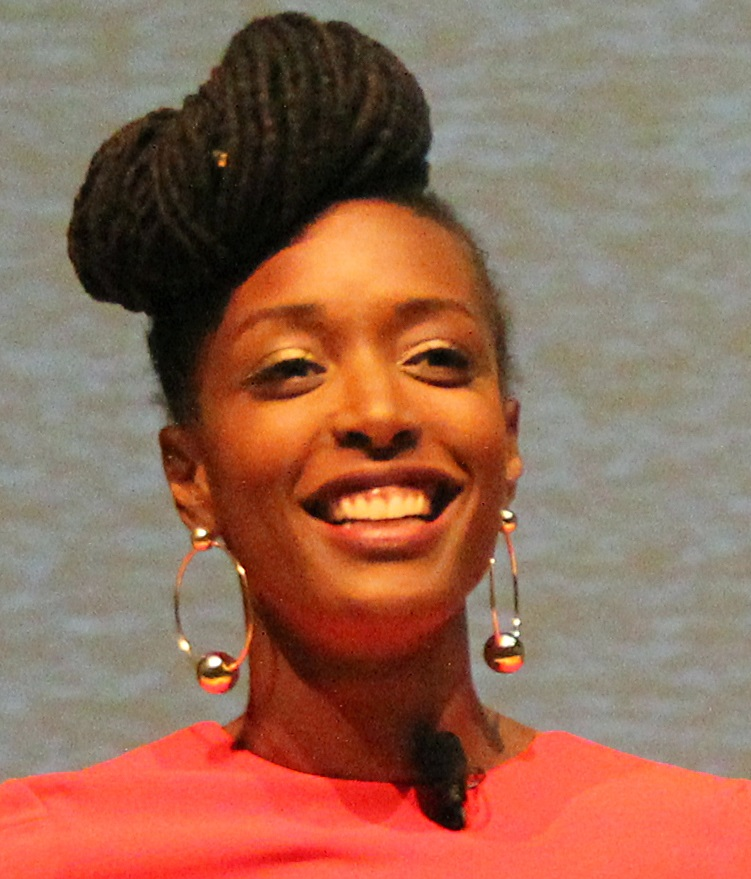
- Ramsey in January 2017
- Born: Franchesca Leigh Ramsey; November 29, 1983 (age 42); West Palm Beach, Florida, U.S.
- Other name: Chescaleigh
- Education: Miami International University of Art & Design
- Occupations: Graphic designer; actress; writer; comedian
- Years active: 2010–present
- Spouse: Patrick Kondas (m. 2013; div. 2019)
- Website: franchesca.net

Franchesca Leigh Ramsey (born November 29, 1983), also known as Chescaleigh, is an American comedian, activist, television and YouTube personality, and actress, who has appeared on MTV and MSNBC. She gained media fame quickly after her YouTube commentary on racial issues went viral, and she built a career as a writer, producer, and performer based on her unintended activism, being thrust into a role as an advisor or coach on social issues.

== Early life and education ==
Ramsey was born November 29, 1983. She is an only child who grew up in West Palm Beach, Florida. She was using computers early, having a website in high school during the 1990s. She attended a performing arts high school, and studied graphic design in college, after trying acting but finding it emotionally painful, and even "abusive". She moved to New York City in 2009 with her future husband when he got a scholarship to study law at St. John's University.

== Career ==
=== YouTube ===
Ramsey had been working in graphic design at Ann Taylor when her 2012 YouTube video "Shit White Girls Say...to Black Girls" went viral and led to interviews on the BBC, Anderson Cooper and NPR. Ramsey's YouTube channel contains topical and socially conscious comedy sketches and song parodies among other videos. Her chescalocs channel is about natural hair. In 2008, Ramsey won the People/YouTube Red Carpet Reporter contest, which greatly increased her channel's popularity. In 2015, Ramsey became the host of the web series Decoded by MTV News, where she discusses racism and cultural issues. Several of Ramsey's videos have appeared on MTV, The Huffington Post, CollegeHumor, Jezebel, and Glamour. In 2017, the show won a Webby Award in the Public Service and Activism category.

==== Online harassment ====
Ramsey has been a target of online harassment, trolling and doxing. According to writer Ijeoma Oluo, Ramsey is one of a group of African-American women who "face regular, coordinated campaigns of abuse aimed at forcing them off of the internet".

After winning the People/YouTube Red Carpet Reporter contest in 2008, Ramsey became the target of racist harassment, beginning with a comment thread stalker posting racial epithets. That person started sending harassing emails to Ramsey's work email address, and then making malware attacks on her employer's email server. The stalker then began posting personal details meant to imply that he was physically tracking and watching her.

Ramsey said she had a good relationship with YouTube personnel in attempting to prevent the harassment, and was selected to participate in a survey of YouTube creators about changes they would like. She said she wanted the ability to block users by IP address, and limit comments to channel subscribers. YouTube did not respond, and the harassment continued. Ramsey discussed minorities being targets of harassment in a 2013 SXSW panel, in which she said she tries to ignore trolls, or hold them up for ridicule, to laugh them off.

Ramsey was one of five YouTubers to receive a US$25,000 grant from John Green's Creators for Change project, to "amplify the voices of people who are not traditionally heard". Green's goal is to help those in a position to speak out and build online communities opposed to hate speech, xenophobia and harassment.

Ramsey says her long experience online has helped her ignore online harassment. She said that she has not hesitated to speak on issues, but has learned to avoid mention of YouTubers by name, speaking in "generalities" instead, knowing that angering a fan base will bring "100,000 twitter messages from children" calling her racial epithets or targeting her then-husband, or harassing her at work. She advises women to choose their battles when confronted with harassment or open prejudice, and to find ways to educate individuals in a work environment, and that it gets easier with practice.

=== Television ===
In early 2016, Ramsey joined Comedy Central's The Nightly Show with Larry Wilmore as a contributor and writer.

Ramsey has also appeared in television series such as Totally Biased with W. Kamau Bell, Broad City, and Superstore.

In April 2017, Comedy Central announced that they were developing a late-night comedy pilot to star and be executive produced by Ramsey.

=== Podcast ===
Ramsey hosted a podcast with her then-husband Patrick called Last Name Basis where the couple talked about their lives and the world around them. The podcast began in January 2015 and ended as a result of their divorce in March 2019 with a total of 112 episodes.

=== Book ===
Ramsey's 2018 book Well, That Escalated Quickly: Memoirs and Mistakes of an Accidental Activist is a collection of essays that describes her unintended role as an activist on racism and online harassment after the sudden media attention to her YouTube commentary. She says the book is intended to help others navigate the online world, including her own mistakes. She admits falling into 'troll behavior' herself, and writes about why she and others have sometimes used destructive behavior online to deal with offline personal pressures and disappointments. She offers strategies for surviving online abuse, encouraging logging off for a time, and regrets engaging rather than ignoring online harassers.

== Personal life ==
Ramsey married Patrick Kondas in 2013. The two divorced in 2019.

On October 11, 2020, Ramsey came out as bisexual on the occasion of National Coming Out Day.

== Works ==
- Ramsey, Franchesca (May 22, 2018), Well, That Escalated Quickly: Memoirs and Mistakes of an Accidental Activist, Grand Central Publishing, ISBN 978-1538761038

== Filmography ==
Year	Title	Role	Notes
2011	The One	Restaurant Patron	
2013	Jared Posts a Personal	Eve	Episode: "Pilot"
2014	Broad City	Darcy	Episode: "Destination Wedding"
2019	Helpsters	Amazing Alie	Episode: "Amazing Alie/Robbie & Rhonda Runner"
2020	Helpsters Help You	Amazing Alie	Episode: "Scavenger Hunt"
2020–2021	Superstore	Nia	Recurring; 9 episodes
2024	After Midnight	Herself	Episode 64
2025	Survival of the Thickest	Jen	Episode: "A Change Gon' Come, Bitch?"

=== Music videos ===
Year	Title	Artist(s)	Role	Ref.
2018	"Girls Like You" (Original, Volume 2 and Vertical Video versions)	Maroon 5 featuring Cardi B	Herself	
