= Ricky Velez =

American comedian and actor

- Born: 1988 or 1989 (age 37–38); Queens, New York, U.S.
- Children: 1

Comedy career
- Years active: 2007–present
- Medium: Stand-up; film; television

Ricky Velez is an American stand-up comedian, writer, and actor. He co-starred with Pete Davidson, in The King of Staten Island (2021), which he also helped write and produce. His first stand-up special, Ricky Velez: Here's Everything, was released on HBO in October 2021.

== Early life and education ==
Ricky Velez was born and raised in Queens, New York in a blue-collar family with two brothers. Velez is half Puerto Rican and half Irish. One of his brothers introduced him to stand-up comedy through half-hour specials on Comedy Central and watching The Daily Show. He studied drama at the Frank Sinatra School of the Arts in Astoria, Queens.

After graduating, Velez attended college for less than a year before he returned to Queens and tried to join the military. He was denied to the military and started working various odd jobs, including for his friend's carpet company, where he would lay carpet for red carpet events.

== Career ==
After returning to Queens at age 19, Velez started working for the Broadway Comedy Club, where he would take tickets while performing stand-up each night. He was dealing with depression at the time and felt he needed "the instant gratification that stand-up gives". During this time, he met Pete Davidson and would later become roommates with him.

In 2014, Velez won the New York's Funniest Stand-Up competition at the New York Comedy Festival. As a result, he was able to land a role as one of the contributors for The Nightly Show with Larry Wilmore (2015–2016). He has said that the experience on the show taught him that he did not like making daily television. Velez has played guest roles in several television shows, including one episode in Crashing in 2018.

Velez collaborated with his long-time best friend Pete Davidson on The King of Staten Island, a semi-biographical film about Davidson by Judd Apatow that was released in 2021. Velez co-starred with Davidson and was also a writer and producer on the film. Velez was cast in June 2019 after Davidson asked him to audition for the part of one of his close friends who is a bad influence on Davidson's character. Velez was excited to be able to deal with topics such as mental health in the film. Velez was also signed by William Morris Endeavor in 2021.

Judd Apatow helped Velez release his first stand-up special later that year on HBO, Ricky Velez: Here's Everything, which was executive produced by Apatow and Pete Davidson. The special deals with topics such as mental health and his family. Velez described the special as "me introducing myself to the world". He had attempted to film the special at his high school alma mater, the Frank Sinatra School of the Arts, but the board of education did not allow it. It was eventually filmed over two shows at Brooklyn Steel on August 28, 2021, with most of the footage used in the special from the second show. Velez had toured for five months prior to filming to work on the material during the COVID-19 pandemic. The special received positive reviews, with Jason Zinoman in The New York Times describing it as a "solid introduction to his spiky, propulsive comedy".

In 2023, Velez portrayed Alex in the television comedy show Single Drunk Female, where he is the former boss and eventual boyfriend of Sam.

== Personal life ==
Velez's mother died in 2016. Velez has a son, born in 2018.

== Filmography ==
=== Films ===
Year	Title	Role	Notes
2020	The King of Staten Island	Oscar	co-writer, co-producer
2022	I Love My Dad	Derek	
2022	The Listener	Ellis	
2023	Good Burger 2	Scrawny goon	

=== Television ===
Year	Title	Role	Notes
2015	Master of None	Ricky	1 episode
2015–2016	The Nightly Show with Larry Wilmore		contributor
2018	Crashing	Himself	1 episode
2021	Pause with Sam Jay	Party guest	1 episode
2023	Single Drunk Female	Alex	6 episodes
2023	Bupkis	Ricky	1 episode
2023	Ten Year Old Tom	voice role	2 episodes
2026	Hell's Kitchen	Himself	Chef's table guest diner for the blue team; Episode: "Revolutionary Revenge"

=== Stand-up ===
Year	Title	Notes
2021	Ricky Velez: Here's Everything	HBO Special
