= Rory Albanese =

American comedian and writer (born 1977)

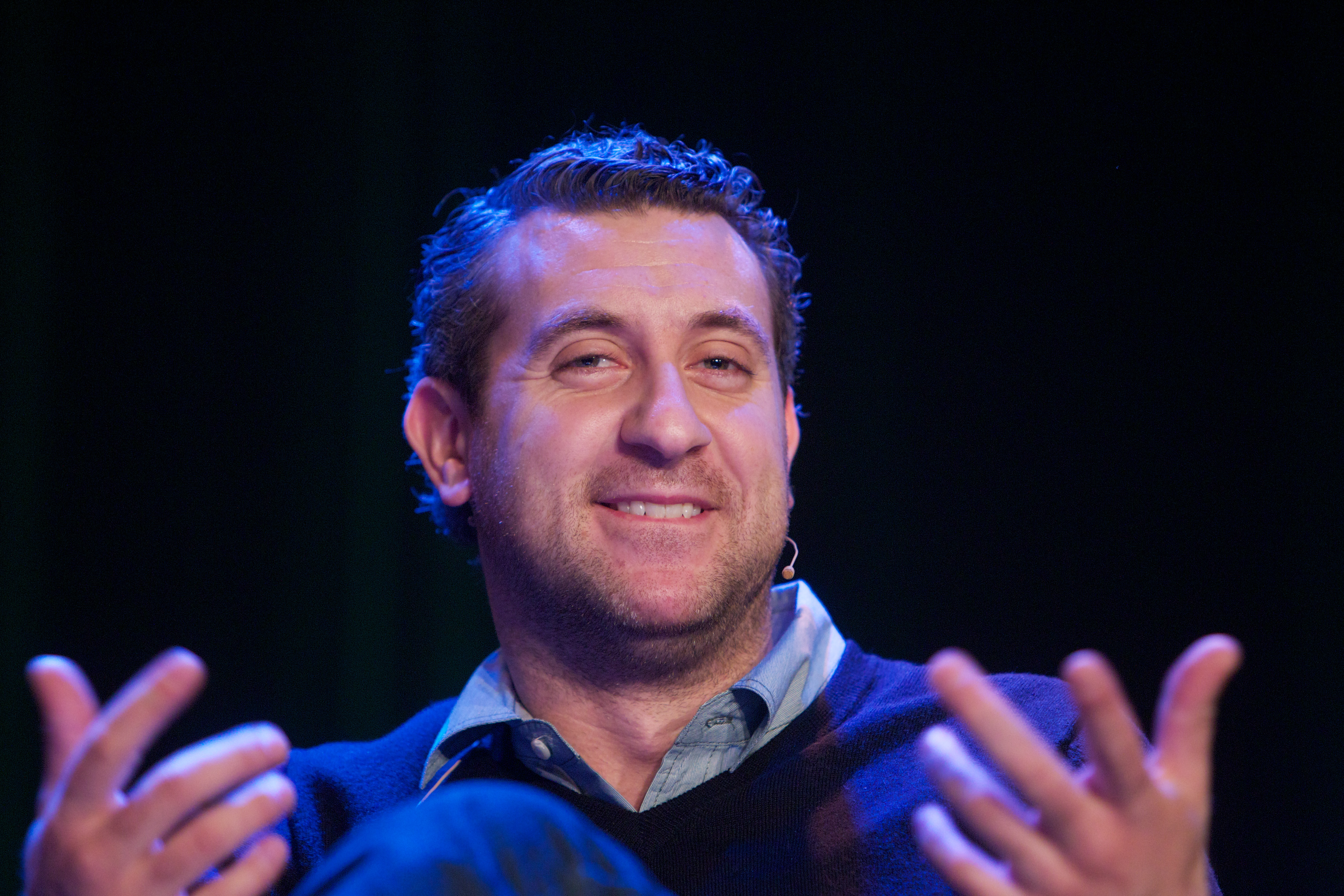
- Albanese in 2011
- Born: Rory Scot Albanese; May 29, 1977 (age 49); Rockville Centre, New York, U.S.
- Education: Boston University (BA)
- Partner: Sarah Silverman (2020–present)

Rory Scot Albanese (born May 29, 1977) is an American comedian, comedy writer and television producer. He was a showrunner, executive producer and writer for The Daily Show with Jon Stewart, which he joined in 1999 and was with until October 2013. He was also an executive producer and showrunner of The Nightly Show with Larry Wilmore.

== Early life and education ==
Albanese was born and raised in Rockville Centre, New York, to a Jewish-Italian family. He earned a Bachelor of Arts degree in communications from Boston University in 1999.

== Career ==
=== Stand-up comedy ===
In the summer of 2006, he joined Lewis Black's Red, White, and Screwed tour, performing with Black all over the country. Albanese has performed with former Daily Show correspondents John Oliver and Wyatt Cenac. He headlines his own shows at clubs and colleges throughout the country. In 2019, he became the executive producer of the ABC talk show Strahan, Sara & Keke.

=== Other work ===
He is the voice of "The American" on the podcast The Bugle.

=== TV and film work ===
Albanese's first half-hour comedy special premiered on April 2, 2010, on Comedy Central.

== Personal life ==
Albanese was married to Jen Flanz, whom he met while both were working for The Daily Show.

In 2010, Albanese was arrested for assault after punching a 9/11 truther who was heckling him outside a book signing.

In late 2020, Albanese began dating Sarah Silverman after spending time remotely playing video games together during the COVID-19 pandemic.
