= Holly Walker (comedian) =

American comedian (born 1967)

- Born: August 15, 1967 (age 59); United States
- Notable work: The Nightly Show with Larry Wilmore

Comedy career
- Genre: Comedy

Holly Walker is an American comedian, actress, and writer known for her role as a correspondent and staff writer on The Nightly Show with Larry Wilmore. Prior to working on The Nightly Show, she toured with The Second City comedy group, performing in Los Angeles, Chicago, and Las Vegas.

Walker got her first taste of performing when she was eight years old and was cast in a production called "For Spring is the Season of Happiness," playing Mother Nature. As an adult, she performed with Boom Chicago in Amsterdam and The Second City across the United States.

== Filmography ==
List of appearances, with year, title, and role shown
Year	Title	Role	Notes
2003	Perfect Proposal	Improv actor	1 episode
2005	Guilty or Innocent?		1 episode
2005	Happily After Forever	Mary	short
2005–06	All of Us	Holly Eliz (Walker)	3 episodes
2010	The Wanda Sykes Show	Angry Black Woman	1 episode
2010	Hitting the Nuts	Jill Fields	
2011	Brothers & Sisters	Judge's Assistant	1 episode
2011	Fenced Off	Tia	
2012	Go On	Clerk	1 episode
2013	The Neighbors	Dealer	1 episode
2013	A Strange Brand of Happy	Angie	
2014	Michele	Siobhan	short
2015–16	The Nightly Show with Larry Wilmore	various	31 episodes
2017	Urban Press	Amber	short
2018	Spider-Man: Into the Spider-Verse		voice
2019	A Black Lady Sketch Show		2 episodes
