= Jordan Carlos =

American stand-up comedian

- Born: February 2, 1978 (age 48); Dallas, Texas, U.S.
- Notable work: The Nightly Show with Larry Wilmore; Guy Code; The Colbert Report
- Children: 2

Comedy career
- Years active: 2001 - present
- Medium: Stand-up, television, television personality
- Website: Official Website

Jordan Carlos (born February 2, 1978) is an American stand-up comedian who played a recurring character on The Colbert Report and was a co-host on the Nickelodeon kids' show Me TV. He also appeared as a panelist and reporter on The Nightly Show with Larry Wilmore.

== Career ==
=== Early career ===
Jordan Carlos graduated Brown University in 2001 and began work as a copywriter in a New York ad firm. At night and on weekends Carlos performed stand-up comedy. Eventually Carlos abandoned advertising altogether in favor of stand-up although he feels he had trouble finding a niche audience because he "wasn't a stereotypical black man". He learned to use that characteristic as the basis for many of his jokes.

=== Role on The Colbert Report ===
On The Colbert Report Carlos played Alan, host Stephen Colbert's "black friend". Whenever Colbert discussed racial issues, he often asked that a picture of him with his African-American co-worker Alan be shown on screen. Colbert sometimes referred to him as "Alan, my black friend Alan". Alan first appeared on a Martin Luther King Day program when Colbert, complaining about having to work on the holiday, brought Alan into the argument, hoping that Alan was angry because he had to work, too. To Colbert's surprise, Alan was not.

=== On The Nightly Show ===
Carlos was a writer on The Nightly Show with Larry Wilmore and also appeared in sketches and, often, on the panel. His characters include Carlos Jordanson (a Hillary Clinton campaign aide) and Dennis Rodman.

=== Other appearances ===
In 2008, Carlos did voice work for the animated comedy webseries Amazing the Lion hosted by the Independent Comedy Network. Carlos has appeared as a special guest in "Episode 253: Chuuch" of the Keith and the Girl podcast. He also made an appearance in Nickelback's "Rockstar" music video and has been a commentator on the E! Network's Worst Dating Show Moments. He made a brief appearance in the buddy cop film Cop Out. Also, he played the math teacher in the short film The Old Man and the Seymour and he was cast in a main role on the MTV series I Just Want My Pants Back.

Carlos has also made appearances in CollegeHumor.com's original videos. Most recently, he portrayed President Barack Obama hosting a barbecue in the video entitled, "Barack Obama's BBQ".

Jordan Carlos was a cast member on Guy Code, Guy Court and Girl Code. He also appeared on two episodes in the first season of MTV's "Joking Off". Carlos also provided the voice of Gene on the animated series Super 4, but quit after the second-season premiere to focus more on his comedy-career.

== Filmography ==
=== Film ===
Film
Year	Title	Role	Notes
2006	Hysterical	Lenny	Short film
2008	Ghost Town	Young Husband	
2008	Tricks of Love	Oliver Fippen	
2009	The Old Man and the Seymour	Mr. Horsey	Short film
2009	The Rebound	Twentysomething #4	
2010	Cop Out	Eric	
2010	My Own Love Song	Presenter	
2011	They're Out of the Business	Network Executive	
2011	Aids Test	Brad	Video short
2011	You're Nobody 'til Somebody Kills You	Fritz	
2012	The Normals	Cafeteria Worker	
2013	Obama Sets High Score in 'Drone Strike'		Short film
2015	Sleeping with Other People	R.A.	
2015	3rd Street Blackout	Ari	
2015	Pop Meets the Void	Recording Engineer	
2015	3 Generation	Jake	Also known as About Ray
2015	Adventures in Comedy	Himself	Documentary
2016	Catfight	Howie the Deaf Guy	
2017	Landline	Ravi	
2017	The Meyerowitz Stories	Waiter	
2017	Super 4: Gunpowder Island Adventures	Various	Voice
2018	Boy Band	Henry	
2018	Alpha Squadron	Alpha 2 / Burp	Short film
2018	We Only Know So Much	Reality Producer #1	
2018	Tasteless	Himself	Documentary
2019	Paper Friends	Guy at Bar	
2020	The Outside Story	Delivery Guy	
2021	Pooling to Paradise	Marc	
2021	Home Sweet Home Alone	Clem Breckin	
2022	I Want You Back	Mark	
2025	After This Death	Carlos	

=== Television ===
Television
Year	Title	Role	Notes
2004	Jump Cuts	Maxwell Percavel	1 episode
2005	Jonny Zero	Sound Engineer	Episode 4: "I Did It All for the Nooky"
2005	Stella	Hipster Guy	Episode 4: "Coffee Shop"
2006	CHTV	Himself; co-host	Episode 3: Crossing Jordan
2006	Exposing the Order of the Serpentine	William	TV movie
2006	3 lbs.	Intern	2 episodes - 1 uncredited
2006	The Colbert Report	Alan	2 episodes - 1 uncredited
2006	Live at Gotham	Himself	Season 1, episode 5
2008–2009	Mayne Street	Jordan Henry	8 episodes
2009	Michael & Michael Have Issues	Male Sketch Player	
2009	Ugly Betty	Speech Writer	Season 4, episode 5: "Plus None"
2010	Mercy	Alex	Episode 18: "Of Course I'm Not"
2010–2013	CollegeHumor Originals	Barack Obama / Obama / CMYKilla / LeBron James / Dennis Haysbert / Additional characters	13 episodes
2011–2012	I Just Want My Pants Back	Eric	Main role; 12 episodes
2011–2012	Jest Originals	Obama	TV shorts 2 episodes
2012	I Love the 1880s		
2013	The Shorts Show	Obama	Season 4, episode 3: "NSA Blurred Lines"
2013	The Eric Andre Show	Black Scientologist	Season 2, episode 9: "Chance the Rapper; Mel B"
2014	Step 9	Josh	Episode 4: "We 'Bout to Be Rich"
2014	Broad City	Doug	Season 1, episode 10: "The Last Supper"
2014	Above Average Presents	Lawyer	Episode: "Approach the Bench Trailer"
2014	Approach the Bench	Lawyer	Episode 3: "Spoilers"
2014	Off the Chain	—N/a	Writer
2014–2015	Super 4	Various	Voice; 19 episodes
2015	Girls	Decker Heyman-Schultz	Season 4, episode 3: "Female Author"
2015	The Affair	Ernest Schiffbaum	Episode: "208"
2015–2016	The Nightly Show with Larry Wilmore	Himself / Carlos Jordanson / Willy Wonka / Dennis Rodman / Various characters	82 episodes Writer - 243 episodes
2016	Viralocity		
2016	Hollywood Horror Stories	Himself	
2016	Join or Die with Craig Ferguson	Himself	Panelist; Episode 2: "History's Worst Medical Advice"
2016	Debate Wars	Himself	Episode 6: "Cats Vs. Dogs"
2016	2016 White House Correspondents' Association Dinner	—N/a	TV special Writer
2017	Friends from College	Chef	Season 1, episode 4: "Mission Impossible"
2017	Reality Disorder	Digital Media Exec 1	TV movie
2017	Uncommon Sense with Charlamagne	—N/a	Writer - 10 episodes
2017	Full Frontal with Samantha Bee	Himself	Season 2, episode 7: "Not the White House Correspondents’ Dinner"
2019	Black Mirror	Simon	Season 5, episode 1: "Striking Vipers"
2019	Helpsters	Heart's Brother	Season 1, episode 3: "Singing Starlett / Heart's Family Photo"
2019	Divorce	—N/a	Story editor - 6 episodes
2019	Gander	Jordan	
2020	The Drew Barrymore Show	—N/a	Writer - 14 episodes
2021	First Wives Club	Curtis	10 episodes Writer - 9 episodes
2021	Teenage Euthanasia	Lester Cuddlefish / Postman / California Raisin / RoboCop / Luke Perry / Additional voices	Voice; 5 episodes
2021	Tha God's Honest Truth with Lenard 'Charlamagne' McKelvey	—N/a	Writer - 7 episodes
2022	Would I Lie to You?	Himself	Panelist; Episode 4: "Boy in a Barrel"
2022	Everything's Trash	—N/a	Writer - Episode: "Family Is Trash"
2023	Awkwafina Is Nora from Queens	Xavier	Episode: "Bad Grandma"

=== Music videos ===
Music videos
Year	Title	Artist
2013	If You're F*cking, You're F*cking	Reggie Watts

=== Podcasts ===
Podcasts
Year	Title	Role	Notes
2019	64th Man	Spanish Announcer / Bouncer / Jose Villanueva / Cornerback	10 episodes
2022	Adulting with Michelle Buteau and Jordan Carlos	Himself/host	
