= Mike Yard =

American stand-up comedian

Mike Yard is an American stand-up comedian. Yard was a contributor for The Nightly Show with Larry Wilmore. Yard was previously the winner of Comedy Central's Get Up, Stand Up comedy competition. He has also appeared on Inside Amy Schumer and The Break with Michelle Wolf.

== Career ==
Yard was born on Saint Croix in the United States Virgin Islands and raised in Frederiksted. When he was 13 he moved with his family to Brooklyn's East New York neighborhood. He was incarcerated for armed robbery, and discusses this in his comedy routines.

He studied computer programming at Hunter College, and later worked briefly as a union representative, involved in organizing a strike at the Museum of Modern Art, before first trying standup comedy when he was 24. He became a well-known presence in the New York comedy circuit, touring actively and appearing on ComicView, Def Comedy Jam and Comedy at the Apollo.

On The Nightly Show, he became known as one of the show's leading contributors, serving as a comic "foil" to host Larry Wilmore, and for his role in political skits such as his portrayal of a talking gun named "Hand Gun" and his recurring "Y Files" segments parodying conspiracy theories. He also has his own podcast called Yard Talk.

In 2018, Yard joined the cast of American Public Media's radio program Live From Here.

== Personal life ==
In 2008 he married plus-size model and actress Mia Amber Davis, who died of a blood clot after knee surgery in 2011.
