= The Nightly Show with Larry Wilmore =

American late-night panel talk show

- Genre: Comedy; News satire; Talk show
- Created by: Jon Stewart
- Directed by: Andre Allen
- Presented by: Larry Wilmore
- Starring: Holly Walker; Ricky Velez; Mike Yard; Rory Albanese; Grace Parra; Jordan Carlos; Franchesca Ramsey; Robin Thede
- Theme music composer: Marc Bonilla
- Country of origin: United States
- Original language: English
- No. of seasons: 2
- No. of episodes: 259 (list of episodes)

Production
- Executive producers: Larry Wilmore; Jon Stewart; Rory Albanese
- Production locations: Hell's Kitchen, New York City, New York
- Editors: Aurora De Lucia; Nick Mougis; Duncan Pettigrew; Amanda Sprecher
- Running time: 22 minutes
- Production company: Busboy Productions

Original release
- Network: Comedy Central
- Release: January 19, 2015 – August 18, 2016

Related
- The Daily Show

The Nightly Show with Larry Wilmore is an American late-night panel talk show hosted by Larry Wilmore that aired on Comedy Central from January 19, 2015, to August 18, 2016. The show was a spin-off of The Daily Show, which featured Wilmore as a recurring contributor. It aired Monday through Thursday at 11:30 PM (ET) following The Daily Show. It served as a replacement for The Colbert Report, which aired at the same time-slot from October 2005 to December 2014.

The show has been described as a combination of The Daily Show and Politically Incorrect. It featured Wilmore's scripted take on the news, followed by a panel discussion and later in most episodes a game with his guests. The Nightly Show with Larry Wilmore received a generally positive reception from critics, but ratings fell after Jon Stewart left The Daily Show. The show was canceled on August 15, 2016, due to poor ratings performance.

== History ==
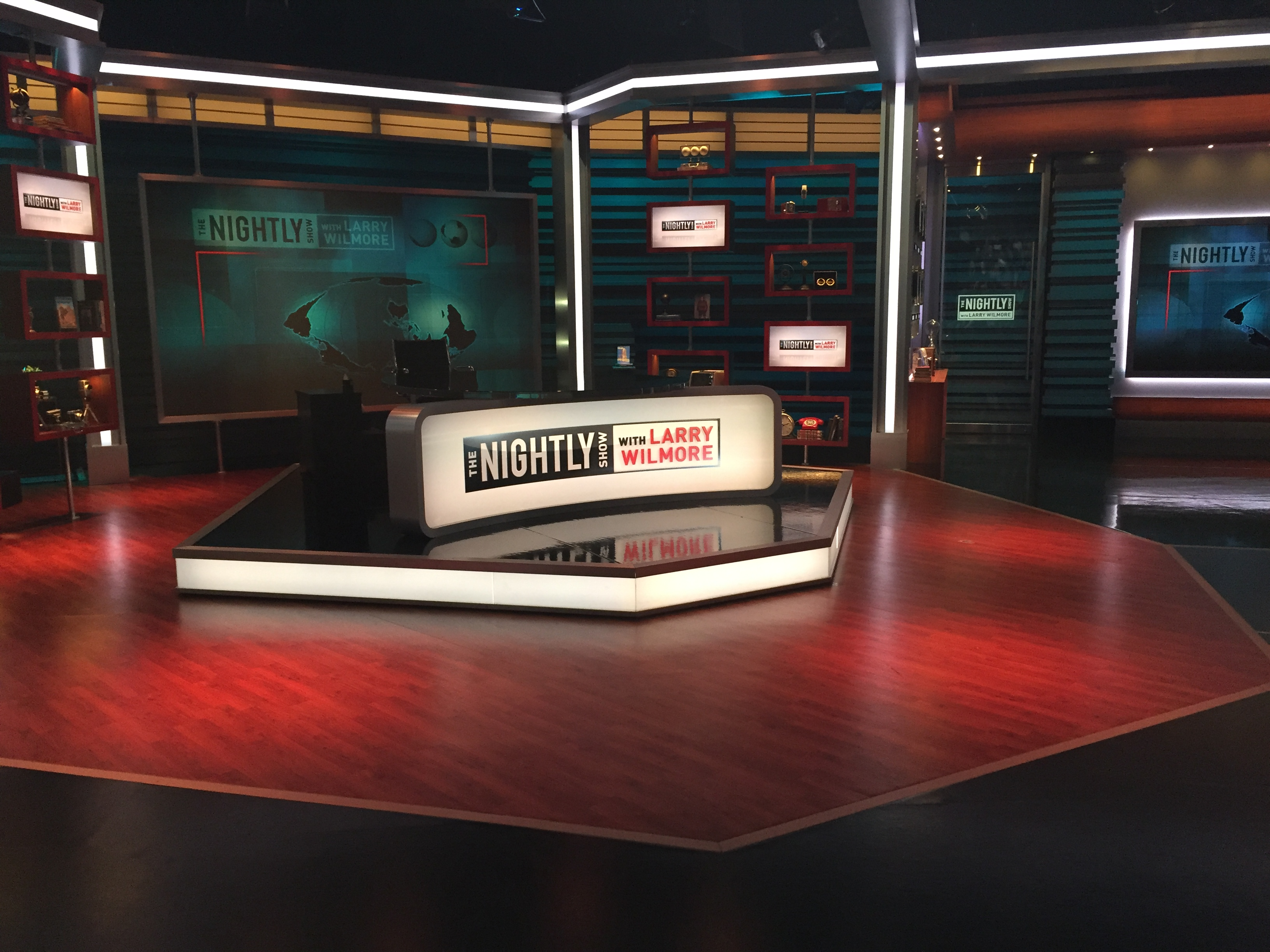
The set of The Nightly Show

The 11:30 PM (ET) time-slot for Mondays to Thursdays on Comedy Central had previously been occupied by The Colbert Report, hosted by Stephen Colbert as another spin-off of The Daily Show, and premiered on October 17, 2005. In 2012, Comedy Central renewed Jon Stewart's contract to host The Daily Show through the end of 2015 and Colbert's contract to host The Colbert Report through the end of 2014.

Colbert intentionally had his contract synced up with David Letterman's contract to host Late Show with David Letterman for CBS, so they would both expire at the same time; in the event Letterman chose to retire, Colbert would be available to take over the show. On April 3, 2014, Letterman announced on his show that he would retire in 2015. On April 10, 2014, it was announced that Colbert would leave Comedy Central at the end of 2014 and replace Letterman as the host of Late Show on CBS beginning in 2015.

The final episode of The Colbert Report aired on December 18, 2014. Jon Stewart pitched the idea to Comedy Central of giving Wilmore a show to air during the 11:30 PM time-slot after his show. According to the network president, Stewart said it would be the ideal time-slot for a show with a different format that would "provide an opportunity for the underrepresented voices out there".

The Nightly Show with Larry Wilmore was produced by Stewart's production company, Busboy Productions. Stewart, Wilmore, and former The Daily Show showrunner Rory Albanese served as executive producers. Wilmore had been slated to be showrunner on the ABC sitcom Black-ish (on which he is now billed as a consulting producer), but had to decline so he would be available to host The Nightly Show.

On May 9, 2014, it was officially announced that Wilmore had been selected to host a show to air in the 11:30 PM time-slot for Mondays through Thursdays on Comedy Central beginning in 2015. Wilmore, like Colbert, had been a long-running cast member on The Daily Show prior to getting a spin-off. He had worked as a contributor on the show since August 2006; he served as the "Senior Black Correspondent" and also ran "Wilmore-Oliver Investigates" alongside John Oliver. The original title of the show was going to be The Minority Report with Larry Wilmore, which was suggested by Jon Stewart. It was later changed as a result of receiving backlash from Fox as they intend to use the same title for an upcoming series based on the 2002 film of the same name, Wilmore later stated he was happy with the title change.

The show was taped at NEP Studio 54, NEP Broadcasting's West 54th Street studio that was also used for The Daily Show until June 2005 and for The Colbert Report throughout its entire run.

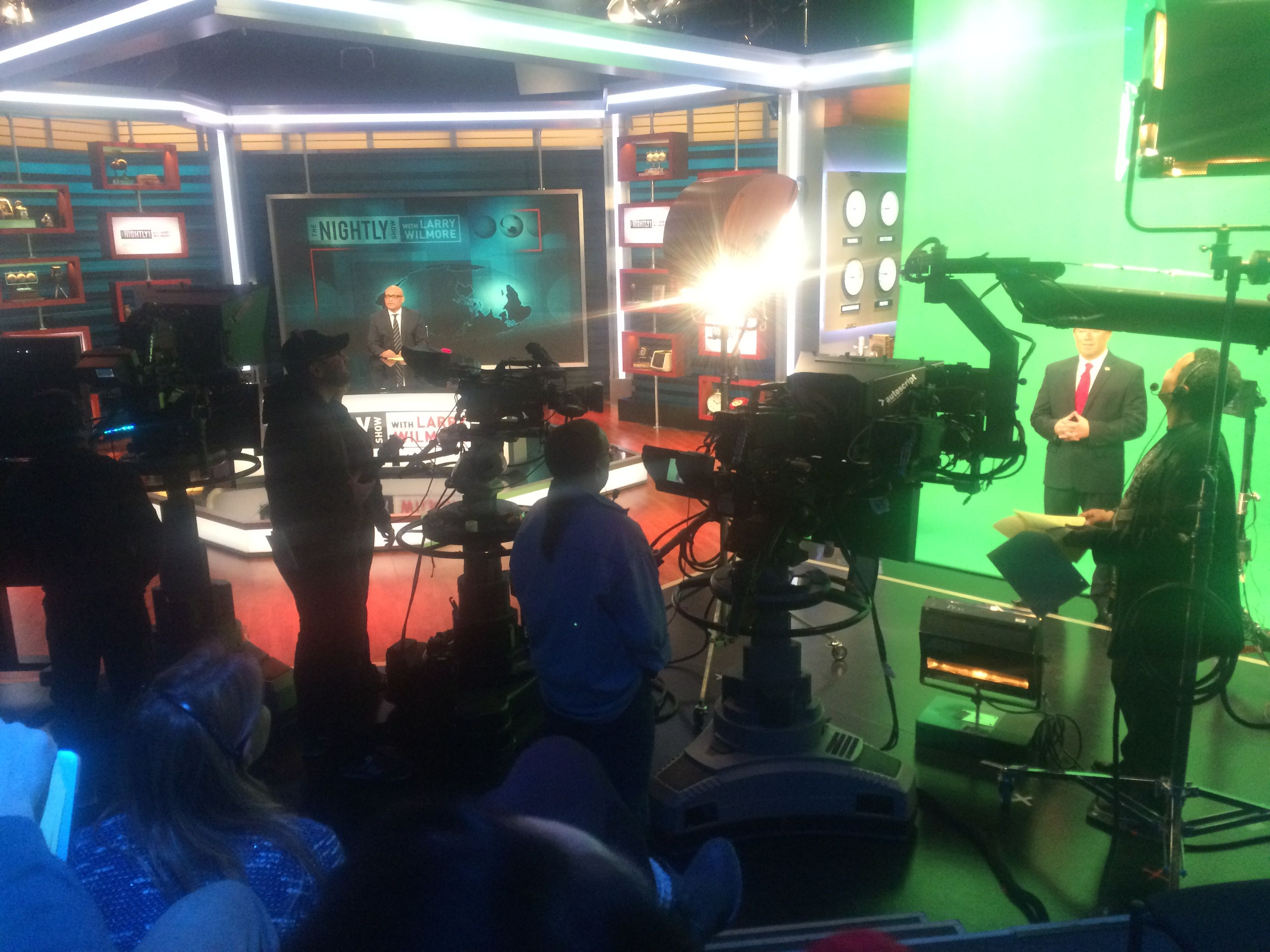
A rehearsal of an episode of The Nightly Show

The Nightly Show with Larry Wilmore was the third late-night show to be hosted by a cast member from The Daily Show, behind The Colbert Report and Last Week Tonight with John Oliver, which is hosted by John Oliver for HBO. Samantha Bee followed Wilmore as the fourth Daily Show alum to host a show with the debut of Full Frontal with Samantha Bee in February 2016 (although her show airs in prime-time, not late-night).

On August 15, 2016, it was announced that The Nightly Show with Larry Wilmore had been cancelled and would temporarily run episodes of @midnight in its spot. Comedy Central's president Kent Alterman said of the cancellation, “it hasn’t connected with our audience in ways that we need it to... in terms of multiplatform outlets and with shareable content and on social platforms as well.”

Wilmore responded “It’s not designed to have the type of things that [Jimmy] Fallon and [James] Corden do, like the [carpool] karaoke type of thing or lip sync battle and those types of things because those are such pure comic things... Ours is so much more specific and has different structure to it, so it does get shared, but it’s just a different tone.” He also expressed his disappointment about the cancellation, saying he was "saddened and surprised we won’t be covering this crazy election or ‘The Unblackening‘ as we’ve coined it. And keeping it 100, I guess I hadn’t counted on ‘The Unblackening‘ happening to my time slot as well.”

Ultimately, Wilmore expressed pride in the work, saying “One of our goals was to have people and voices on the show that have been underrepresented and don’t always get a voice and a say and gave them a voice and a say... I’m very proud of the fact that we did that.” In one of the final shows, he quipped, "our show going off the air has to mean one thing: Racism is solved. We did it.”

== Writers and contributors ==
=== Writers ===
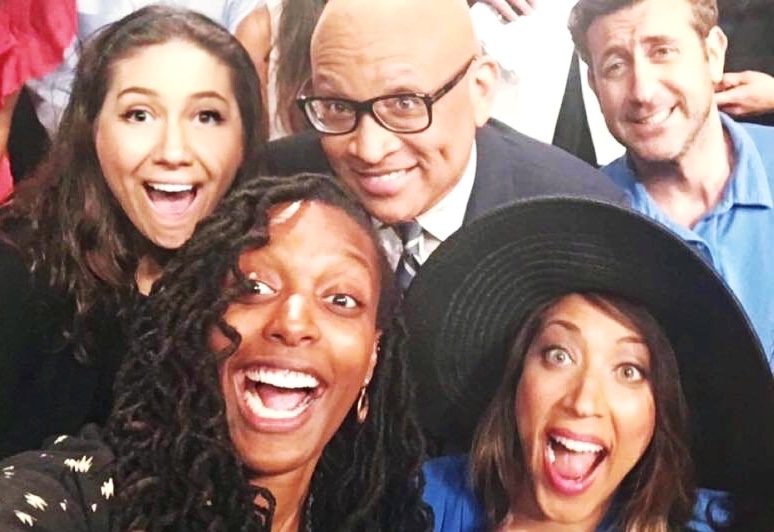
Clockwise from center top: Host & Executive Producer Larry Wilmore, Executive Producer Rory Albanese, Head Writer & Contributor Robin Thede, Contributor Franchesca Ramsey, and Editor Aurora De Lucia in a group photo on set

Jon Stewart was the creator and served as executive producer with Larry Wilmore. Robin Thede served as head writer for the first season and a half of the show, the first black woman to hold that position on a late-night talk show. Beginning with episode 233, Michael Pielocik served as the head writer. He was one of the writers before that.

The other 14 writers of the show were:

- Rory Albanese (also Executive Producer)
- Jordan Carlos
- Lee H. Ellenberg (episodes 213–259)
- Bobby Gaylor
- Jack Helmuth
- Franchesca Ramsey (episodes 169–259)
- Tim Siedell
- Owen Smith (episodes 244–259)
- Wayne Stamps (episodes 225–259)
- Sasha Stewart
- Robin Thede (also former head writer: episodes 1–159)
- Jeremy Weiner (episodes 213–259)
- Colleen Werthmann
- Matt Whitaker (episodes 117–259)
- Larry Wilmore (also Executive Producer)

Former writers:

- Cord Jefferson (episodes 1–196)
- Amy Ozols (episodes 1–236; also former co-executive producer)
- Holly Walker (episodes 1–218)
- Tom Ruprecht is a former writer (episodes 1–159) and head writer (episodes 160–232).

=== Contributors ===
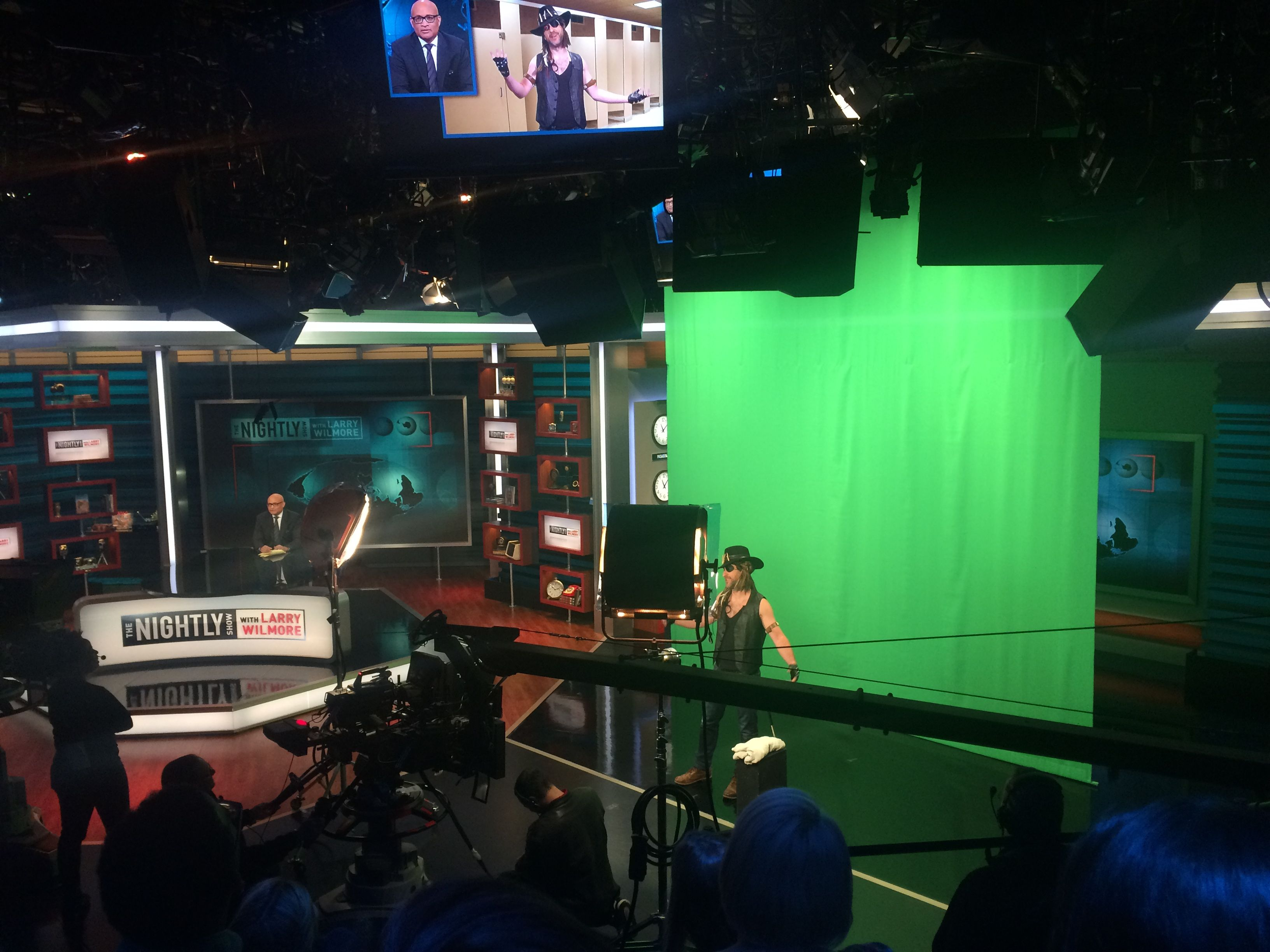
Contributor and Executive Producer Rory Albanese rehearsing with Larry Wilmore

The contributors included:

- Robin Thede
- Rory Albanese
- Holly Walker
- Felonious Munk
- Jordan Carlos
- Ricky Velez
- Mike Yard
- Grace Parra
- Franchesca Ramsey
- Shenaz Treasury (between January and May 2015)

== Format ==
The show's format has been described as a combination of The Daily Show and Politically Incorrect. Episodes would begin with a scripted take on the news by Wilmore, followed by a panel discussion led by him, in which he discussed a particular predetermined topic with his guests. In the first three months, there were four panelists. In April 2015, the number of people on the panel changed to three and writers/contributors began appearing more on the panel.

Beginning in November 2015, the panel would include two writers/contributors and one outside panelist. The roster changes with each show, but often featured comedians, journalists, politicians, and authors. Sometimes the opening news segment would be omitted in favor of a longer panel discussion. The end of Monday episodes of The Daily Show used to feature Jon Stewart talking to Wilmore leading into The Nightly Show, a practice also used during the early years of The Colbert Report.

On the format, Wilmore said "I'm not interested in doing a show where I give my opinion and people react to my opinion. Our show is more about the discovery of things. I want people who will teach me something." He also predicted that some people might change their minds on certain issues after hearing the different arguments in depth.

=== Recurring segments ===
- Keep it 100 – Wilmore challenges each guest to answer a controversial question completely honestly on the spot. Guests whom Wilmore and the audience believe to be answering honestly receive "I Kept It 100" stickers, even if the panel or audience may not necessarily agree with what was said, while those whom the audience suspects of overthinking their answer, waffling, or being less than honest are presented with a bag of "weak tea", displaying the show's logo. Occasionally Wilmore asks the audience to submit their own "Keep it 100" questions to him via social media, one of which is selected by staff of the show and presented to Wilmore in the following episode, who does not get to see the question in advance before answering on the spot during the taping. During February 2016, the show had a special Keep It 100 – Black History Edition, which highlighted the history of discrimination that black people faced.

The Nightly Show with Larry Wilmore featured a cast of contributors to help add different perspectives to the show and aid in comedy bits.

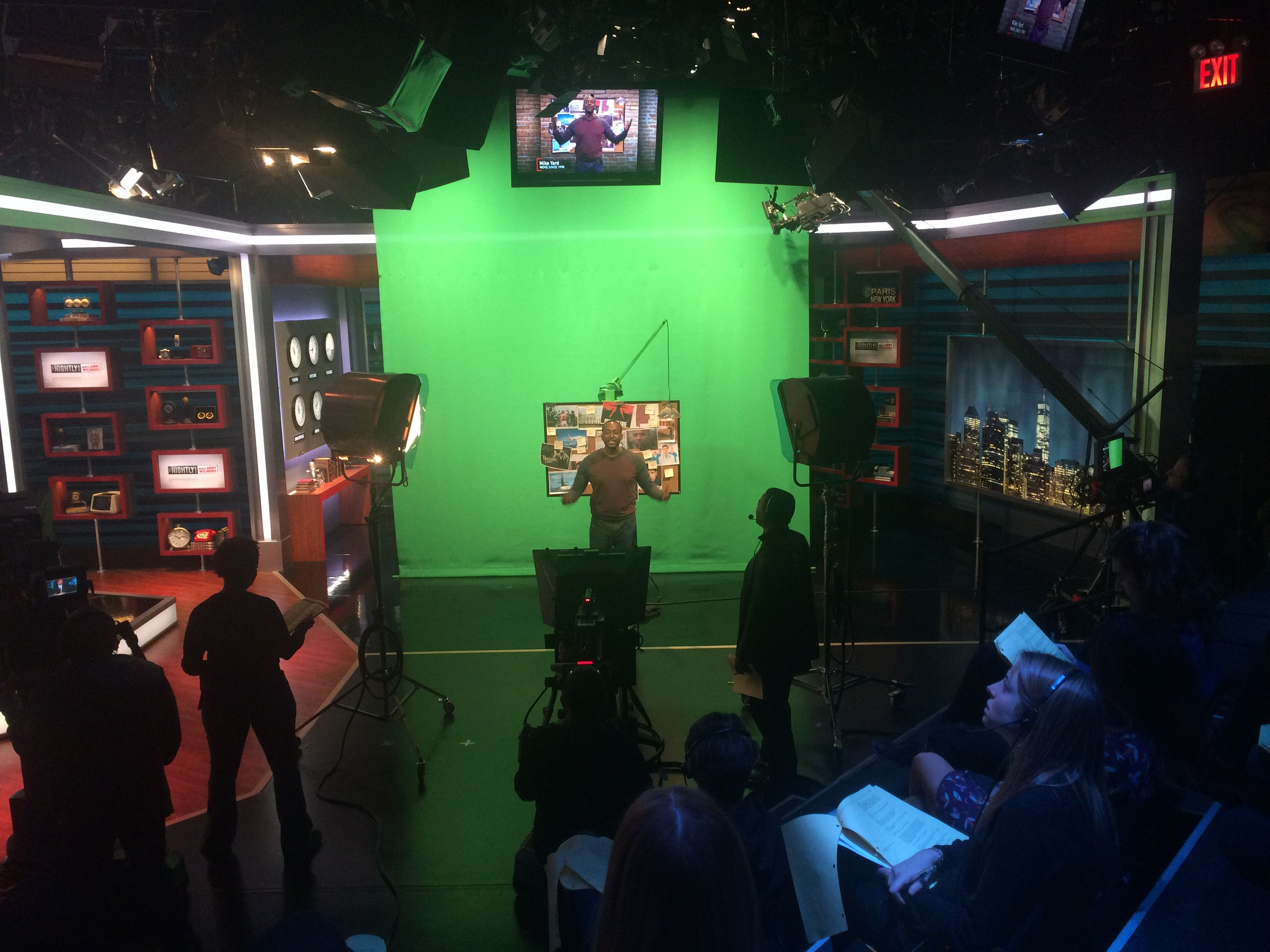
Contributor Mike Yard rehearsing for his recurring segment "Mike Yard's Y Files"

- Nightly! Nightly! – Grace Parra reports like an entertainment reporter on serious topics.
- Blacklash 2016: Unblackening – News about the 2016 presidential election.
- Pardon the Integration – Mike Yard (who is black) and Rory Albanese (who is white) debate controversial subjects (for example reparations) and are required to switch sides midway through and advocate the other side's position. At the end, because of the changed viewpoints, Albanese and Wilmore are convinced that Yard is a racist.
- Carlos Jordanson – Hillary Clinton aide
- #Hash it Out with Franchesca Ramsey
- Resident Blegghead with Felonious Munk – Felonious Munk poses as a sesquipedalian academic, confusing both Larry and the audience by using unnecessarily large words to make simple points.
- Mike Yard's The Y Files – Mike Yard's conspiracy theories
- 2 Chainz Explains - Rapper 2 Chainz tries to clarify a seemingly complicated issue.

=== Field pieces ===
The Nightly Show made several field pieces (pieces filmed outside the studio, in the field), as ways to bring light to certain issues such as:

- Planning a Plantation Wedding - Robin Thede and Mike Yard go undercover in Kentucky to investigate the phenomenon of plantation weddings
- Stranded in a Food Dessert - Jordan Carlos "struggles to survive" a food dessert in Camden, New Jersey
- Politics and Pole Dancing in Philadelphia - The show traveled to "the darker side" of the 2016 DNC with Grace Parra
- Meet Donald Trump's Black Supporters
- Laying Pipe - a "sexy PSA" for improving Flint, Michigan's infrastructure

== Topics and themes ==
The Nightly Show with Larry Wilmore had a "commitment to covering race, gender and class issues — particularly as the [2016] presidential election draws closer."

Multiple times, the show covered the killing of Black people, often by police. After the Killing of Alton Sterling, Wilmore stated, “What really gets me is that whenever this happens, there’s always an immediate takedown of the dead man’s character... So he had a criminal record. Martha Stewart has a criminal record. I don’t remember her being executed in a convenience store parking lot.” After the Killing of Freddie Gray, Wilmore did a segment with members from rival gangs - both the Bloods and Crips at the same table, talking about unrest in Baltimore.

Wilmore was "relentless" in this coverage about Bill Cosby. He opened his second show with “We’re talking Cosby... We’ll answer the question ‘Did he do it?’ The answer will be yes.” Later, in the panel segment of that same episode, he said, “I understand that people are innocent until proven guilty in the court of law. However this is the court of public opinion and this is my show. And that [expletive] did it.” Wilmore also stated Cosby "was never a hero of mine," and was an "a**hole." Throughout the series, whenever there was new Cosby news, Wilmore would repeat the refrain, "We didn't forget about you motherf**ker!" (or sometimes "We still didn't forget about you motherf**ker!"). After Cosby's arrest, Wilmore said, "Yes! We didn't forget about you motherf**ker -- and neither did the justice system!

In June of 2016, when a Colorado high school valedictorian, Evan Young, was barred from giving a graduation speech in which he planned to come out as gay, Wilmore invited him on the show to give his [abridged] speech. Wilmore said, “Congratulations on being so brave and taking a stand. We’re all so proud.”

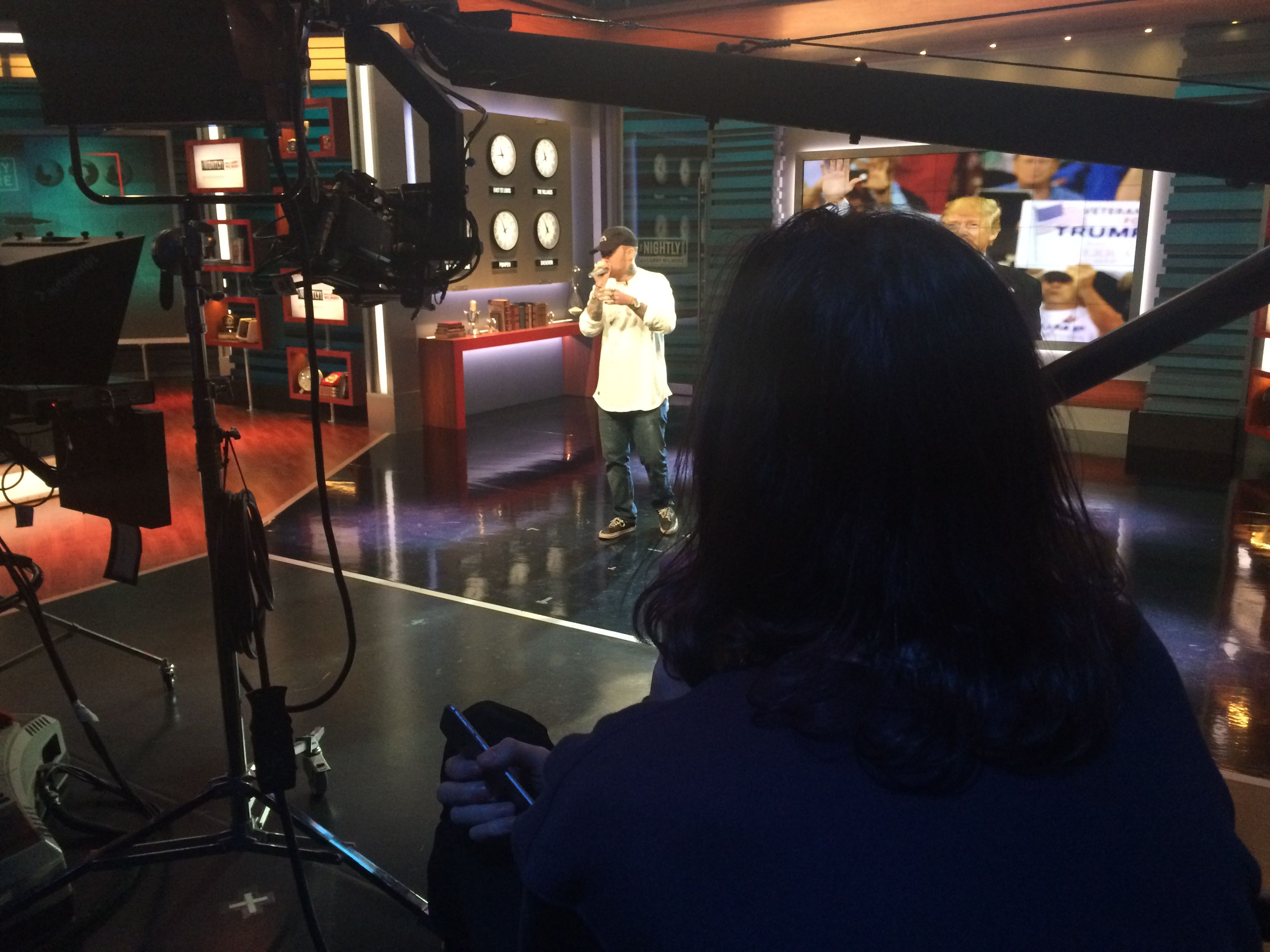
Mac Miller on the set of The Nightly Show with Larry Wilmore

The Nightly Show with Larry Wilmore consistently spoke against Donald Trump. In March 2016, Wilmore had Mac Miller on the show who said Trump was "lowering the bar for our nation’s intelligence" He said, "I f*cking hate you Donald Trump" and said he was “an egomaniacal attention-thirsty psycopathic power hungry delusional waste of skin and bones” and a "racist f*ckwad." Miller did say if Trump won, he wouldn't leave the country, saying he's "staying right the f*ck here... I'm gonna be here every day telling the world how much I hate you, how much of a clown you are and how we as a nation are better than you will ever be as a racist f*ck-wad of a human, because I love America, and I'm never giving it up to a troll like you, you b*tch!"

Wilmore himself, not just his guests and contributors, consistently spoke out against Trump. He started one segment with "old tiny hands is at it again." And when asked various hypothetical "Keep it 100" questions, he always chose the non-Trump option - even saying he'd rather watch reruns of the Cosby show than caucus for Trump and that he'd even hire Megyn Kelly as a Contributor if it would prevent a President Trump.

Wilmore also had a panel on to discuss how Trump dangerous with Charlamagne tha God saying "Charlamagne saying Trump is genuinely terrifying and “not making America great again. He’s making America hate again... I’m from South Carolina, so I’m used to seeing the Confederate flag around. When I see Trump paraphernalia, that’s what it looks like to me. Trump paraphernalia is the new Confederate flag. You know? It’s a hate symbol. To me, it’s a hate symbol. The bumper stickers, Trump bumper stickers, the Trump T-shirts, they look like hate symbols to me. Period.” Grace Parra agreed saying she would "rather not be deported." Contributor Holly Walker did a segment lambasting Trump's views on abortion. Rand Paul said Trump is "A Delusional Narcissist And An Orange Faced Windbag" while on the show. On July 22, 2016, YG (rapper) and Nipsey Hussle performed "F*ck Donald Trump (FDT)" on the show.

== Controversial segments ==
=== Bill Nye incident ===
During a panel on September 29, 2015, about NASA's discovery of water on Mars featuring Bill Nye, comedians Ricky Velez and Michelle Buteau continually interrupted Nye and denied interest in the discovery. Nick Venable of CinemaBlend called the telecast "insipid", adding "if anybody out there is watching The Nightly Show for science information – and that's a long shot since the show's ratings aren't that strong anyway – then you're doing it wrong."

Vox's Alex Abad-Santos described the incident as "the segment that made me stop watching The Nightly Show" and "one of the most unpleasant viewing experiences in recent memory." "Nye's genuine, earnest explanation is met by Velez yelling," Abad-Santos noted. "I'm not worried about Mars. Why would I be excited about Mars? I'm barely excited about Earth," Velez yelled. "Trump is first in polls right now!"

When Wilmore did a Reddit AMA in February 2016, outrage over the Nye segment dominated most of the discussion, with more than 1,000 comments specifically criticizing the show's treatment of Nye, characterized by Adweek's David Griner as the moment that many thought the show "turned away from Stephen Colbert's legacy of intellectualism." In response, Wilmore was surprised by the outcry, "It was just a conversation," he wrote on Reddit. "People are allowed to have a point of view. Bill Nye had a great time on that panel. He's been on the show a couple of times. People are allowed to have opinions. For the life of me, I really don't understand why people are so upset that someone would disagree with Bill Nye. I was on Bill's side of that, but still, who cares? It's just a conversation." Bill Nye has since appeared on the show, making light of the incident.

=== Otto Warmbier ===
In June 2017, Wilmore came under fire for comments he had made in an episode of The Nightly Show originally broadcast on March 1, 2016. When reporting on the case of Otto Warmbier, an American college student arrested in North Korea for allegedly attempting to steal a propaganda sign, Wilmore had repeatedly ridiculed Warmbier. While showing footage of a tearful Warmbier giving his testimony, Wilmore referred to Warmbier as "Otto Von Crybaby" and suggested Warmbier thought he had "Frat Bro Privilege." Warmbier was subsequently sentenced to 15 years of hard labor. He died on June 19, 2017, after being medically evacuated from North Korea to the U.S. in a comatose state, after 15 months in prison. In a podcast on June 22, 2017, Wilmore offered an apology for his earlier remarks.

== Reception ==
=== Initial reviews ===
Upon its debut, The Nightly Show with Larry Wilmore received generally positive reviews. On Metacritic the first season currently holds a 69 out 100 rating, indicating "generally favorable reviews". Brian Lowry of Variety wrote that the show's premiere "showed promise," commenting, "Wilmore exhibited a quickness and light touch about sensitive topics, yet struggled to bring much coherence or flow to the overpopulated discussion that took up most of the premiere."

David Kallison of The A.V. Club concurred with this sentiment, remarking, "He is more traffic cop than travel guide in this first episode, but his inherent wit and quickness shines through regardless," deeming the debut a "triumph." USA Today's Robert Bianco opined that "Wilmore already seemed completely comfortable as the show's host, as well he should be," calling it a "solid start."

Don Kaplan of the Daily News said the program was a "welcome addition" to late-night television, summarizing, "While the program as a whole has room to grow, Wilmore's comedy is sharp, solid and filled with keen observations and strong enough to have earned him the distinction of being the only high-profile black voice in late night television."

The Hollywood Reporter's Tim Goodman wrote that the show's premiere was "predictably strong" and that "the slight nitpicking should not obscure the fact that overall Wilmore was funny; his show was smart and thoughtful, has a bright future and seems an excellent fit with Stewart and the Comedy Central brand."

Wilmore paid a special tribute to Colbert during the closing of the first episode by thanking him for "making 11:30 special." Following the debut of the first episode Stephen Colbert praised The Nightly Show on Twitter, saying he was impressed, and using the hashtag "keepingit100."

=== Ratings ===
The debut episode was watched by 963,000 viewers in its original broadcast in the United States. The show averaged 417,000 viewers a night in the key demographic of viewers ages 18 to 49 within its first three months. In March, the show's total viewings were down 38% from the average total of 1.24 million viewers received by The Colbert Report.

By June 2015, the show's total 676,000 viewers average was down 45% from the average total of 1.24 million viewers received by The Colbert Report. The show's average 230,000 viewers in the key demographic of ages 18 to 49 a night was down 45% from the 417,000 viewers its first 3 months averaged.

In August, International Business Times reported that Nightly's ratings were in a "freefall" due to losing its Daily Show lead-in audience (Daily had gone on a seven-week hiatus before Trevor Noah's debut as host) and lacking online viral hits. Nielsen showed Wilmore's ratings down 40% since Stewart's departure as Daily Show host.

Average live viewers:

- January 2015: 885,000
- February 2015: 849,000
- March 2015: 726,000
- April 2015: 634,000
- May 2015: 615,000
- June 2015: 708,000
- July 2015: 773,000
- August 2015: 605,000
- September 2015: 405,000
- October 2015: 489,000
- November 2015: 489,000
- December 2015: 516,000
- January 2016: 511,000
- February 2016: 564,000
- March 2016: 548,000
- April 2016: 527,000
- May 2016: 532,000
- June 2016: 547,000
- July 2016: 541,000
- August 2016: 548,000

== See also ==
- List of late-night American network TV programs
- The Rundown with Robin Thede, a late-night talk and variety show hosted by a Nightly Show head writer/co-star.
- The Opposition with Jordan Klepper, which took The Nightly Show's timeslot after its cancellation.
- Lights Out with David Spade, which took The Opposition's timeslot after its cancellation.
