= Mel Mitchell (comedian) =

Melanie Mitchell (born 1994) is an American actress and comedian. She is known for her social media videos such as the Hoes Not Humans podcast satire series and as the co-host of the comedy podcast Jokes on You.

== Life and career ==
Mitchell was born and raised in Atlanta, Georgia, in addition to spending a few years of her adolescence in Miami, Florida. She grew up enjoying comedy series and stand-up shows like ComicView, but never considered a comedy career. Mitchell received her bachelor's degree from FAMU as a third generation alumna.

Mitchell began performing stand-up comedy in 2017. That year she also created and launched the podcast Jokes on You. She regularly tours with KevOnStage and has opened for Roy Wood Jr. and Zainab Johnson. In 2024 she headlined shows in Atlanta and New York.

Mitchell has been noted for her comedic social media videos, such as Thick Girl, the Black Girl Avenger; a depiction of a Black teacher at Hogwarts; and a parody video of director Ryan Coogler. She gained wider prominence in 2023 for her video series Misogynistic Podcasts Be Like, for which Mitchell plays the co-hosts of the fictional podcast Hoes Not Humans, a satire of misogynistic podcasts.

She has acted in Churchy, The Hospital, and The Airport, web series created by Kevin Fredericks.

Mitchell resides in Atlanta. She married her husband, Dwayne, in 2026.

== Accolades ==
- 2023 – Forbes 30 under 30, Local Atlanta
- 2026 – Mashable 101, Rising Stars
