= The Truth (podcast) =

Fiction podcast

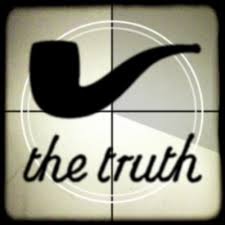
- Genre: Fiction
- Language: English

Production
- Production: Jonathan Mitchell (Executive Producer); Davy Gardner (Associate Producer)

Publication
- No. of episodes: 125
- Original release: 2012 – 2023
- Provider: Radiotopia

Related
- Website: thetruthpodcast.com

The Truth was an anthology fiction podcast and founding member of Radiotopia by PRX. Episodes were released about once every two weeks. Several nationally syndicated public radio programs, including This American Life, Studio 360, Snap Judgment, and The Story, featured work by The Truth.

Voice actors who appeared on the show included Jesse Eisenberg, Lauren Adams, Scott Adsit, Craig muMs Grant, Tami Sagher, James Urbaniak, Tom Ligon, Jo Firestone, Tallie Medel, Jackie Hoffman, and F. Murray Abraham.

== History ==
In 2009, Jonathan Mitchell and Hillary Frank received funding from American Public Media to produce pilot stories together. One of those stories was "Moon Graffiti", which was later featured on The Guardian podcast and won the 2010 Gold Mark Time Award. This story later became the first episode of The Truth.

In December 2011, Ed Herbstman and Mitchell hired a group of improvisors (many from the Magnet Theater, which Herbtsman co-founded) to write stories together, with the goal of producing a story in one month. The first piece was "Interruptible". The group continued working together and eventually reached the podcast's current output of two stories a month.

The Truth was named by iTunes to be the Best New Arts podcast of 2012 and the #1 new podcast of 2012 by The Daily Dot.

The show's title comes from a quote by Ralph Waldo Emerson: "Fiction reveals truth that reality obscures."

The Truth stopped production in 2023 after the episode Pariah.

== Episodes ==
=== 2012 ===
Date	Episode	Voices
November 2, 2012	Moon Graffiti	Matt Evans, Ed Herbsman, and John Ottavino
February 14, 2012	Eat Cake	Eliza Skinner, Birch Harms, and Curtis Gwinn
February 22, 2012	Movie Mash-Up	
June 3, 2012	Interruptible	Christian Paluck, Chet Siegel, Louis Kornfeld, Amy Warren, Ed Herbstman, Melanie Hoopes, Charlotte Rabbe, and Jamie Rivera
March 20, 2012	They're Made Out of Meat	Russ Armstrong and Miriam Tolan
November 4, 2012	Everybody SCREAM!!!!	Chet Siegel, Emily Tarver, and Ed Herbstman
April 25, 2012	Tape Delay	Ed Herbstman and Tami Sagher, with Libby George and Christian Paluck
September 5, 2012	People Beat	India Kotis, Matt Evans, Melanie Hoopes, Carmen Berkeley, Matt J. Weir, Bryn Magnus, Christian Paluck, Ed Herbstman, and Amy Warren. With Tim Dadabo, Louis Kornfeld, Chet Siegel, Leanne Linsky, Jon Bander, and Kelly Moylan
May 23, 2012	Total Transparency and Eye Contact	Chet Siegel, Ed Herbstman, and Louis Kornfeld
June 6, 2012	In Good Hands (part 1)	Emily Tarver, Alex Marino, Louis Kornfeld, Ed Herbstman, Christian Paluck, and Amy Warren.
June 20, 2012	Human Intelligence	Ed Herbstman, John Ottavino, and Melanie Hoopes
December 7, 2012	In Good Hands (part 2)	Emily Tarver, Alex Marino, Louis Kornfeld, Christian Paluck, Ed Herbstman, Amy Warren, and Ben Jones
July 25, 2012	Lucy and the Bike Girl	
September 8, 2012	Third Party	Ed Herbstman, Chet Siegel, Rick Andrews, Nick Kanellis, Louis Kornfeld, Amy Warren, and Bryn Magnus
August 22, 2012	Machine Men	
May 9, 2012	That's Democracy	Peter McNerney, Russ Armstrong, Alexis Lambright, with Fiona Bradford, Teddy Shivers, Oscar Montoya, and Ben Jones
September 19, 2012	Domestic Violins	Amie McKenna, Michele Durman, Michael Whalley, and Martin Dingle Wall. Produced at the Australian Broadcasting Corporation's Radio Beyond Radio conference.
April 10, 2012	Do You Have a Minute for Equality?	Chet Siegel and Tom Ligon, with Matt J. Weir, Quentin Loder, and Melanie Hoopes
October 18, 2012	The Death of Poe	Christian Paluck, Ed Herbstman, Chet Siegel, and Louis Kornfeld
November 2, 2012	The Modern Prometheus	Louis Kornfeld, Rachel Hamilton, Tom Ligon, Chet Siegel, Amy Warren, Ed Herbstman, Christian Paluck, and Rupert Degas
November 14, 2012	In Good Hands (rerelease)	
November 28, 2012	Interruptible (rerelease)	Christian Paluck, Chet Siegel, Louis Kornfeld, and Amy Warren. With Ed Herbstman, Melanie Hoopes, Charlotte Rabbe, and Jamie Rivera
December 14, 2012	Mirror Lake	Ed Herbstman, Lauren Ashley Smith, and Louis Kornfeld

=== 2013 ===
Date	Episode	Voices
October 1, 2013	Happy New Year	Ben Jones and Tom Ligon
February 21, 2013	It's Going to Change Your Life	Kelly Buttermore, Amy Warren, Melanie Hoopes, Louis Kornfeld, Ed Herbstman, and Christian Paluck
March 22, 2013	Where Have You Been?	Ed Herbstman, Ben Jones, Christian Paluck, Chet Siegel, Louis Kornfeld, Amy Warren, and Asher Herbstman
April 11, 2013	Falling	Chet Siegel and Peter McNerney, with Willy Appleman, Louis Kornfeld, Lauren Ashley Smith, Sebastian Conelli, Quinton Loder, Jon Bander, and Kim Ferguson
May 10, 2013	You're Not Alone	Christian Paluck, Carly Monardo, Tom Stephens, Louis Kornfeld, Jon Keller, Kerry Kastin, Nick Mykins, Aina Rapoza, and Ashley Wilson, with musical guest Elizabeth Ziman, singing a song by Daniel Johnston.
August 15, 2013	Fine Dining	Louis Kornfeld, Elana Fishbein, Nick Jaramillo, Tom Ligon, Kevin Cragg, Kerry Kastin, Brian Frange, Bob Kern, and Matt Evans. With improv groups Featherweight and Nurse Practitioner.
August 29, 2013	Sweets for the Cheat	Jon Bander, Alessandro King, Bianca Casusol, Brian Frange, and Elana Fishbein.
September 15, 2013	The Mutiny	Melanie Hoopes. Asher Herbstman, Bea Herbstman, Blanche Ames, Ed Herbstman, Shacottha Fields, and Noel Dinneen
September 29, 2013	Keep Running	Peter McNernery, with Elana Fishbein, Louis Kornfeld, Julia Hynes, and Teddy Shivers
October 13, 2013	The Talk	Christian Paluck, Dmitry Shein, Willy Appelman, and Elana Fishbein
October 24, 2013	The Devil You know	
November 11, 2013	The Memoirist	Elana Fishbein, Matt Antonucci, Kevin Kiernan, Lauren Olson, Alessandro King, Sebastian Connelli, Blanche Ames, Kevin Cragg, and Michael Kroll
November 25, 2013	Tough Crowd	Alejandro Kolleeny, Annemarie Cullen, Devin O'Neill, Megan Gray, Noel Dinneen, Maddy Mako, Matt Shafeek, Shacottha Fields, Louis Kornfeld, and Elana Fishbein
December 10, 2013	Naomi's World	Isabel Frohnhofer, Tom Ligon, Elana Fishbein, Imran Chowdhury, Laura Parker, Philipp Goedicke, Dennis Pacheco, Blanche Ames, Ron Palais, Willy Appelman, Andrew Yurman-Glaser, and Phoebe Tyers
December 20, 2013	Biological Clock	Tami Sagher, Ed Herbstman, Louis Kornfeld, and Kerry Kastin

=== 2014 ===
Date	Episode	Voices
January 25, 2014	It's Your Funeral	Andy Moskowitz, Jackie Hoffman, Ben Jones, Damon Ketron, Phoebe Tyres, Shacottha Fields, Blanche Ames, Amy Warren, and Rebecca Robles
March 10, 2014	The Extractor	Ed Herbstman, Kevin Cragg, Annemarie Cullen, Dennis Pacheco, and Rebecca Robles. With Melanie Hoopes, Bea Herbstman, Alex Marino, and Kerry Kastin.
March 30, 2014	Jeff Gets Towed	Andrew Yurman-Glaser, Sebastian Conelli, and Phoebe Tyers
April 15, 2014	Interns	Maggie Morris as Melanie, and Emily Shapiro as Annalyse. With Willy Appelman, Dennis Pacheco, Elana Fishbein, and Louis Kornfeld
May 14, 2014	Voyager Found	Chet Siegel and Peter McNerney
May 28, 2014	The Penis Museum	Phoebe Tyers and Damon Ketron. With Elana Fishbein, Alejandro Kolleeny, Kerry Kastin, and Ira Gamerman.
June 18, 2014	Chaotic Neutral	Elana Fishbein, Jon Bander, Justin Moran, and Matt Shafeek
September 17, 2014	Cold Read	Alex Marino, Christina Dabney, Blanche Ames, and T.J. Mannix
October 15, 2014	Silvia's Blood	Andy Moskowitz, Rebecca Robles, Diana McCorry, Ben Jones, and Al King
November 12, 2014	Return of the Extractor	Ed Herbstman and Elana Fishbein. With Louis Kornfeld and Alejandro Kolleeny
November 26, 2014	Sketchballs	Rosie Whalen and Chris Dwane, with Louis Kornfeld
December 18, 2014	Naughty or Nice	Seth Lind, Elana Fishbein, Louis Kornfeld, Eli Itzkowitz, Ed Herbstman, Shaina Feinberg, Tom Ligon, Kevin Cragg, Willy Appelman, Kerry Kastin, Katie Corr, Phoebe Tyers, Pat May, Olivia Simonson, Asher Herbstman, Bee Herbstman, Melanie Hoopes, and Gregory C. Jones

=== 2015 ===
Date	Episode	Voices
January 15, 2015	The One about the Dead Dog	Phoebe Tyers and Dennis Pacheco, with Nick Mykins, T.J. Mannix, and Chris Dwane
February 11, 2015	Don't Touch a Thing	Amy Warren, Armando Diaz, Jackie Hoffman, Louis Kornfeld, and Noel Dinneen
March 12, 2015	Living the Dream	Adam Wade, Chrissie Gruebel, Dan Fairall, and Blanche Ames
March 26, 2015	Joe Frank	Mark Hammer, Barbara Sohmers, Carolyn Swift Hammer, Arthur Miller, F. Murray Abraham, Annalee Jefferies, Eric Seers, and Paul Mantell
April 8, 2015	Can You Help Me Find My Mom?	Bee Herbstman, Melanie Hoopes, Ed Herbstman, Evan Sudarsky Abadi, Gregory C. Jones and Blanche Ames
May 20, 2015	The Last Job	Peter McNerney, Louis Kornfeld, Rebecca Robles, India Kotis, Dave Hill, Alex Marino, Phoebe Tyers, Rupert Degas, and T.J. Mannix
June 4, 2015	Remember the Baby	Ann Carr, Louis Kornfeld, and Amy Warren
July 16, 2015	Dark Matter	Kevin Corrigan, Chet Siegel, Ed Herbstman, Dennis Pacheco, Alexis Lambright, Anna Sale, and Rob Webber
September 10, 2015	Enjoy the Suffering	Bianca Casusol, Kate Emswiler, Louis Kornfield, Jake Hart, Blance Ames, Jimmy O'Connell, and Kerry Kastin
September 24, 2015	Tuesday	Anni Ginsterer, Belinda Jombwe, Rupert Reid, and Rahel Romahn
October 23, 2015	Starburst	Matt Antonucci, Angela DeManti, Kerry Kastin, Alejandro Kolleeny, and Louis Kornfeld
December 16, 2015	Santa for President	Tom Ligon, Rachel Dratch, Russell G. Jones, Connie Ray, Shaina Feinberg, Willy Appelman, Jo Firestone, Phoebe Tyers, Mo Rocca, Helen Coxe, T.J. Mannix, Lauren Ashley Smith, Bill Rohlfing, Mario Correa, Kerry kastin, Louis Kornfeld, and Benjamin Correa

=== 2016 ===
Date	Episode	Voices
January 15, 2016	Call of Dating & The Big Prawn	"Call of Dating" is performed by Clair Galea and Dennis John Cahill. "The Big Prawn" is performed by Katia Pase.
February 12, 2016	Visible & Drive Straight Ahead	"Visible" is performed by Russell G. Jones, Rachel Hamilton, Ann Carr, and Kerry Kastin.
March 9, 2016	Man V. Nature	David Pasquesi, Ed Herbstman, and Mark Gessner.
April 14, 2016	Songonauts (Episode One)	Jonathan Mann, Elena Skopetos, Bianca Casusol, Tom Ligon, Louis Kornfeld, Jimmy O'Connell, Amy Warren, and Dan Fairall
May 12, 2016	The Man in the Barn	Sarah Reynolds, Joe Mullins, Maeve McGrath, Diarmuid McIntyre, and Louis Kornfeld
June 9, 2016	Songonauts (Episode Two)	Jonathan Mann, Elena Skopetos, Bianca Casusol, Tom Ligon, Louis Kornfeld, Jimmy O'Connell, Amy Warren, and Dan Fairall
July 13, 2016	The Making of That's Democracy	
September 7, 2016	Sleep Some More	Brian Miskell, Mark Gessner, Lusia Strus, and Hannah Chase
October 12, 2016	Cor-wrong-ct!	Peter McNerney, Lane Kwederis, Alessandro King, Scott Adsit, Laura Grey, Ed Herbstman, Tami Sagher, April Matthis, Becca Schall, Willy Appelman, Louis Kornfield, Tom Ligon, and Blanche Ames
November 10, 2016	Commentary Track	Birgit Huppuch, Libby Woodbridge, and Maurice Jones
December 7, 2016	Naughty or Nice	Seth Lind, Elana Fishbein, Louis Kornfeld, Eli Itzkowitz, Ed Herbstman, Shaina Feinberg, Tom Ligon, Kevin Cragg, Willy Appelman, Kerry Kastin, Katie Corr, Phoebe Tyers, Pat May, Olivia Simonson, Asher Herbstman, Bee Herbstman, Melanie Hoopes, and Gregory Jones
December 22, 2016	The Sweet Music of Friction	Khalil Kain, Craig muMs Grant, Keith Randolph Smith, Shamika Cotton, Chris McKinney, Louis Kornfeld, Jaymes Jorsling

=== 2017 ===
Date	Episode	Voices
January 11, 2017	The Dark End of the Mall	Lauren Adams and Peter Grosz
January 25, 2017	Ice Music (re-release) & Mirror Lake	Gregory Whithead; Ed Herbstman and Lauren Ashley Smith with Louis Kornfeld
February 9, 2017	A Drop in the Ocean	Gregory Jones, Chris McKinney, Russell G. Jones, Billy Griffin Jr., Reynaldo Piniella, and Michael Cullen, with the Magnet Theater improv team Eagelfox.
February 22, 2017	Bloodless	James Urbaniak
March 8, 2017	Miracle on the L Train	Joanna Hausmann, T.J. Mannix, Christina Dabney, Philip Godicke, Rachel Rauch, Shacottha Fields, Suni Reyes, Lou Gonzalez, Louis Kornfeld, Adam Twitchell, Will Quinn, Leonard Lyzner, Joe Lepore, Dennis Pacheco, and Andrew Vuilleumier
March 23, 2017	Scavenger Hunt	Rebecca Robles and Louis Kornfeld
April 13, 2017	Hey Bumblebee	Alexis Pereira, Elana Fishbein, Michael Delisle, Kelsey Bailey, Anna Neu, Angela DeManti, Matt Shafeek, Becca Schall, Ed Herbstman, Hannah Chase, Dennis Pacheco, and Bill Rohlfing
April 26, 2017	Intimacy Challenge	Leonard Lyzner, Florencia de la Lorca, Russell G. Jones, Gillian Glasco, Lipica Shah, and Jordan Mahome
May 10, 2017	Do the Voice	Erica Schroeder, Brian Dykstra, Marc Thompson, Justin Morgan, Rosie Whalen, Susan J. Jacks, Chris Kipiniak, Lorena Russi, Eric Molinsky, Kerry Kastin, Asher Herbstman, and Rob Webber
June 29, 2017	Influencers (Part I of II)	Michael Delisle, Ann Carr, T.J. Mannix, Michael Cullen, Chris McKinney, Will Quinn, Becca Schall, Louis Kornfeld, Chris Kipiniak, and Kerry Kastin
September 13, 2017	Possible Side Effects	Adam Wade, Hannah Chase, Mariette Strauss, Elana Fishbein, Dennis Pacheco, Anne Antonucci, Jeremy Bent, Noel Dinneen, and Seth Lind
September 27, 2017	Brain Chemistry	Scott Adsit, Amy Warren, Ed Herbstman, Anna Neu, Billy Griffin Jr., Alexis Lambright, Louis Kornfeld, Elana Fishbein, Joanna Hausmann, and Kerry Kastin
October 11, 2017	Magic Hugs	Austin Pendleton, April Matthis, Jenny Lee Mitchell, Becca Schall, Kevin Cobbs, Louis Kornfeld, Chris Kipiniak, Kerry Kastin, Kate Chapman, T.J. Mannix, and Phoebe Tyers
October 25, 2017	The Decider	Tallie Medel, Tim Platt, and Kelsey Bailey
November 11, 2017	Game Night	Bill Rohlfing, Adelaide Kipiniak, Max Kipiniak, Brandi Varnel, Margaret Burrus, Kelsey Bailey, Jack Frederick, Jimmy O'Connell, Leonard Lyzner, Willy Appelman, Ariel Gitlin, Richie Moriarty, Lila Newman, Elana Fishbein, Suni Reyes, Dennis Pacheco, Andy Moskowitz
November 23, 2017	Troll	Abby Royle, Kyle Gordon, Ashlie Atkinson, Jennete Cronk, Jaymes Jorsling, Kerry Kastin, Chris Kipiniak, Becca Schall, Lila Newman, Louis Kornfeld, and Matt Shafeek
December 13, 2017	Mall Santa	Tom Ligon, Chris Dwane, Anna Neu, Bianca Casusol, Jimmy O'Connell, Kevin Cobbs, Louis Kornfeld, Kerry Kastin, Becca Schall

=== 2018 ===
Date	Episode	Voices
January 31, 2018	The Co-op	Hannah Chase, Dennis Pacheco, Amy Warren, Susan Owen, Betty Hudson, Joel Bernstein, Michael Cullen, and Sam Tsoutsouvas
February 14, 2018	Nuclear Winter	Woody Fu, Danielle Delgado, and Billy Griffin, Jr.
February 28, 2018	Rideshare	Dana Kaplan-Angle, Amir Darvish, and Boris Khaykin
March 21, 2018	The Hilly Earth Society	Michael Cullen
April 5, 2018	The Runaways	Jenny Mudge and Chris Henry-Coffey
April 19, 2018	Justice Battalion	Jake Hart, Marc Thompson, Erica Schroeder, Billy Bob Thompson, and Graham Rowat
May 10, 2018	The Matter of Tyco	Lila Newman, Erica Hernandez, Fred Newman, Joel Bernstein, Jack Frederick, Jeff Wucher, Kyle Gordon, Davy Gardner, and Margaret Burrus
June 7, 2018	The Jesse Eisenberg Effect	Jesse Eisenberg, Keith Rubin, Jaymes Jorsling, Jeremy Bent, Lenny Thomas, Jeff Wucher, and Jonathan Mitchell
June 20, 2018	Fish Girl	Bee Herbstman, Alison Cimmet, Scott Richardson, and Ed Herbstman
July 12, 2018	Wonderworld, U.S.A.	Taylor Dalton Curtis, Federico Rodriguez, Sam Tsoutsouvas, Lila Newman, Chris Kipiniak, Peter McNerney, Molly Kiernan, Davy Gardner, John Ross, Kyle Gordon, Anthony Sneed, Dennis Pacheko, Phoebe Tyers, Becca Schall, Matt Whitfield, Amy Warren, Marisa Brau, Mike Cabellon, Rick Andrews, and Louis Kornfeld

== Awards ==
Year	Award	Episode
2010	Mark Time Gold Award	"Moon Graffiti"
2010	PRX Zeitfunk Award 2010 for Most Listened-to Piece	"Moon Graffiti"
2013	Mark Time Gold Award	"The Modern Prometheus"
2013	Ogle Silver Award	"In Good Hands"
2013	Ogle Silver Award	"That's Democracy"
