= Reminiscin =

Single by Saison featuring CeCe Peniston
- B-side: "Remix"
- Released: July 17, 2001
- Genre: House
- Length: 5:57 (LP version)
- Label: Holyfield's Real Deal; Orpheus
- Songwriters: CeCe Peniston; Ella Mae Saison
- Producer: Matthias Heilbronn

Ella May Saison singles chronology
"I Believe" (1999)	"Reminiscin" (2001)	"Now That Your Gone" (2005)

CeCe Peniston singles chronology
"My Boo" (2001)	"Reminiscin" (2001)	"For My Baby" (2003)

"Reminiscin" is a 2001 song by the musician Ella Mae Saison, featuring CeCe Peniston. The song partially mixed in the France as well New York City, was sponsored by a multiple world champion boxer, Evander Holyfield, and released in April on his own record label named after his nickname "Real Deal". After being classified as the Billboard Hot Dance Breakout number one for the category of Maxi-Singles Sales (on August 4), the song hit number thirty in the Billboard Hot Dance Music/Club Play chart on August 11, 2001.

== Track listings and formats ==
12", US, #757667063410; 12", US, #7576670634-10

1. "Reminiscin" (RPO Vocal Mix) - 6:32
2. "Reminiscin" (Matty's Soulflower Mix) - 8:47
3. "Reminiscin" (Matty's Deep Dub) - 9:02
4. "Reminiscin" (RPO Dub) - 6:42

MCD, US, #757667063427; MCD, US, Promo, #757667063427

1. "Reminiscin" (LP Version) - 5:57
2. "Reminiscin" (RPO Vocal Mix) - 6:32
3. "Reminiscin" (RPO Dub) - 6:42
4. "Reminiscin" (Matty's Soulflower Mix) - 8:47
5. "Reminiscin" (Matty's Deep Dub) - 9:02
6. "Reminiscin" (Matty's II Deep Club Mix) - 8:47
7. "Reminiscin" (Matty's II Deep Beats) - 5:13
8. "Reminiscin" (RPO Instrumental Dub) - 6:41

== Credits and personnel ==
- Ella Mae Saison – lead vocal, writer
- CeCe Peniston – lead vocal, writer
- Matthias "Matty" Heilbronn – mix, arranger, producer
- Rick Pierre O'Neil – mix, producer
- NCP Studios, New York City – studio, mix
- RPO Traxx Studio, France – studio, mix

== Charts ==
Chart (2001)	Peak position
US Dance Club Songs (Billboard)	30
