= Ella May Saison =

Filipino singer

- Born: Ella May Jan T. Saison; Bacolod, Philippines
- Genres: Soul; pop
- Occupations: Singer; songwriter
- Years active: 1992–present

Ella May Saison (also credited as Ella Mae Saison) is a Filipino singer referred as the original Philippine Queen of Soul.

== Career ==
Saison began her recording career at age 19. Prior to landing a recording contract, she was a soloist for the Artstart Band, specializing in jazz, gospel, and blues. In the Philippines, she is best known for her hits "Till My Heartaches End" written by Vehnee Saturno and "If the Feeling Is Gone", subsequently covered by Passage and Kyla, respectively. Saison won the Katha Award for Best Female Performer for the song "If the Feeling Is Gone" written by Jimmy Borja, and she was also recognized in the Philippines for one Gold and one Platinum album.

A year after her second album release, she signed a recording deal with Evander Holyfield's independent record label, Kats Eye, and released So In Love in 1997. The songs "So In Love" and "Never Had A Chance" were released as singles. Andrew Rollins and Don Williams were producers, songwriters and musicians on the album except for "Never Had A Chance" which was co-written by Judith Jordan, Ronnie Hammon and Rollins. Jerry Brown was the engineer. The album was recorded at A&M Studios. Humberto Gatica was also an engineer.

In addition to working with Humberto Gatica (producer of Celine Dion), she has worked with Gerry Brown (producer of Vanessa Williams) and artists such as The Eagles and IV Xample. Timothy B. Schmit of The Eagles contributed background vocals to the So In Love album, as did Eagles contemporary John David Souther.

There has been a degree of controversy associated with the credits to So In Love. It is contended that Saison specifically worked with Bryant Woodert (PKA Lucius) of IV Xample, who produced her vocals for the title song to the album. This song, written by Don H. Williams and Andrew Rollins, went on to win an award in the Philippines for best vocal production. Bryant Woodert never received any credit for doing vocal production, though he is listed as a background singer on the album credits (under Lucius of IV Xample). Though Gerry Brown was the engineer for this session, it is contended that he did not participate in any vocal direction, even though he and Andrew Rollins were given the credit for this. Andrew Rollins, who was said to be in New York at the time of the recording, later received the Philippine award for best vocal production.

Saison released a single with CeCe Peniston entitled "Reminiscin", which made the Billboard Charts under the "Powerpick Club Play" category, hitting number 30. Peniston's opinion of Saison is as follows: "(In) January 2001, we collaborated on a duet titled "Reminiscin" that charted on 'Billboard's Club Playlist'. I was fortunate to witness the warmth of a beautiful personality and the great talent of a rising star. I hope the world will be allowed to share in this experience too." Saison also performed at the Awards Dinner of the Republic of South Africa and the African Times in honor of President Nelson Mandela. She recently sung "The Star-Spangled Banner" at the Countrywide Classic/ATP US Open Series at UCLA since July 17, 2007.

In the early 2000s, her focus became more regional than national, when she joined Los Angeles-based covers band Dark Sunday, as lead singer, where she was well received.

She returned to the Philippines in 2005, to great acclaim, but then left again for California in the United States where she continues her career.

In July 2011, Saison performed "Till My Heartaches End" on Party Pilipinas.

== Discography ==
=== Albums ===
- 1992: Language of Soul
- 1994: Full of Love, Full of Soul
- 1996: Best of Ella May Saison (Viva)
- 1997: So In Love (Kats Eye)
- 2005: Ella May Saison Soulful (Star Records)
- 2006: Ella May (Silver Series, Viva)

=== Compilation albums ===
- 1998: The Best of Love Duets (Viva Collection Forever)

=== Singles ===
- 1992: "'Til My Heartaches End"
- 1992: "'One Body One Soul"
- 1992: "'Hiram Na Sandali"
- 1993: "If the Feeling Is Gone"
- 1993: "Goodbye's not Forever"
- 1994: "Full of Love"
- 1997: "So in Love" (Kats Eye)
- 1997: "Never Had A Chance" (Kats Eye)
- 1999: "I Believe"
- 2001: "Reminiscin" featuring CeCe Peniston (Real Deal)
- 2005: "Now That Your Gone" (Star Records)
- 2005: "Ikaw ang Lahat sa Akin" (theme song to the ABS-CBN teleserye, Ikaw ang Lahat sa Akin)
- 2014: "Fate Isn't So Kind" (Independent release on iTunes, Cd Baby and Amazon.com)
