= DaMya Gurley =

American writer, actress and comedian

- Born: Pittsburgh, Pennsylvania
- Education: University of North Carolina School of the Arts (BA)
- Notable work: A Black Lady Sketch Show

Comedy career
- Medium: TikTok, Sketch comedy

DaMya Gurley is an American writer, actress, and comedian. She is known for her comedic TikTok videos and as a cast member on season four of A Black Lady Sketch Show.

== Life and career ==
Gurley was born and raised in Pittsburgh's Hill District. She attended high school at Pittsburgh CAPA and after graduation she moved to New York, where she completed a two year acting certificate at American Musical and Dramatic Academy. In 2016, Gurley got 3rd place in the National August Wilson Monologue Competition. She received her bachelor's degree in acting at the University of North Carolina School of the Arts.

She built a fan base by posting comedic videos on TikTok, in part due to spending more time on the platform after the COVID-19 pandemic began in spring 2020. She was invited to join the cast for the in-development comedy variety sketch show Stapleview for which she took a semester off from school. Based in Los Angeles, the show launched in 2022 with fellow comedians Sarah Coffey, Dylan Adler, Gray Fagan, Grace Reiter, Sydney Battle, and Jane Wickline. Each show was written by the cast and performed weekly in front of a live audience while being streamed on TikTok.

Gurley's first television role was as a featured player on A Black Lady Sketch Show's fourth and final season. In January 2024 she starred in the play The Messengers at the Broadwater Main Stage. She had a recurring role on season one of the comedy series Churchy.

Gurley is queer. She resides in Los Angeles.
