= Lauren Ashley Smith =

American writer, comedian, and producer

- Born: St. Louis, Missouri, U.S.
- Education: Dickinson College
- Occupations: Writer, comedian, producer
- Notable work: A Black Lady Sketch Show
- Spouse: Brooke Helburn (m. 2015)

Lauren Ashley Smith is an American writer, comedian, and producer. She is the head writer of HBO's A Black Lady Sketch Show (2019–present), for which she has received three Emmy Award nominations. Smith previously worked for The Rundown with Robin Thede, Best Week Ever, Watch What Happens Live, and Fashion Queens.

== Early life and education ==
Smith was born and raised in St. Louis, Missouri. She has two sisters, Mariah and Rachel. Her parents, Rochelle and Jonathan, are administrators at Saint Louis University and Washington University in St. Louis. Smith received her bachelor's degree from Dickinson College.

== Career ==
Smith's writing career started as a freelancer for Best Week Ever, Watch What Happens Live, and Fashion Queens. In 2017, Smith was hired as the head writer for The Rundown with Robin Thede, which ran for one season. Thede later hired Smith again as the head writer and co-executive producer of A Black Lady Sketch Show. Smith is the first Black woman to be a head writer on a TV sketch show. The series debuted in 2019, and Smith received Emmy nominations for Outstanding Variety Sketch Series (2020, 2021) and Outstanding Writing for a Variety Series (2021).

In 2021, it was announced that Smith will create and produce an American reboot of Timewasters, a British time-travel comedy series. The ABC reboot will center four present-day Black New Yorkers who find themselves in the Harlem Renaissance. In August 2021, she signed an overall deal with CBS Studios to create comedy content for the network's broadcast and streaming platforms.

== Personal life ==
Smith is a lesbian and uses she/her pronouns. She married her wife, Brooke Helburn, in 2015.

== Filmography ==
Year	Title	Role	Executive producer	Writer	Notes
2016	The Characters	Lady on the Bus	No	No	Episode: "Lauren Lapkus"
2016	Billy Eichner and 'Potato the Potato'		No	No	Short film
2016	My Famous Dead Boyfriend	Therapist	No	No	
2017	The Rundown with Robin Thede	—N/a	No	Yes	Head writer
2019	Between Two Ferns: The Movie	The Mysterious Donna	No	No	
2019– present	A Black Lady Sketch Show	—N/a	Yes	Yes	Head writer
2020	Dicktown	Croquet Player	No	No	

== Awards and nominations ==
=== For A Black Lady Sketch Show: ===
- 2020 – Nominee, Primetime Emmy Awards, Outstanding Variety Sketch Series
- 2021 – Nominee, Primetime Emmy Awards, Outstanding Writing for a Variety Series
- 2021 – Nominee, Primetime Emmy Awards, Outstanding Variety Sketch Series
