= Angel Laketa Moore =

- Born: 1980 (age 45–46)
- Other name: That Chick Angel
- Education: University of Kentucky; University of California, Irvine
- Occupations: Comedian; actress; rapper; writer
- Years active: 2000–present
- Children: 4
- Awards: NAACP Image Award for Outstanding Social Media Personality (2024)

Angel Laketa Moore (born 1980), also known as That Chick Angel, is an American comedian, actress, rapper, and writer. She has acted in the series Atypical, Bel-Air, A Black Lady Sketch Show, Paradise, and Churchy. Moore co-hosts the podcast Here's the Thing with KevOnStage. In 2023 her rap single "One Margarita" went viral. She won the 2024 NAACP Image Award for Outstanding Social Media Personality.

== Career ==
Moore began acting professionally in 2000 by doing regional theater. She received her MFA from University of California, Irvine and relocated to Los Angeles shortly after. Her first televised acting role was as a recurring character on ER. Pregnant with first child in 2009, she began to create online content under the name "That Chick Angel" that centered motherhood and comedy. She created the web series Mommy Confessions and Maternity Leave. She also started the podcast Is This Going To Cause An Argument with her husband. In June 2020 Moore joined the podcast Here's the Thing with KevOnStage as a co-host.

She has acted in series including Black-ish, Atypical, Churchy, and Paradise. She was initially cast in a main role for the sitcom Rel but the role was recast. In 2022 she joined the cast of A Black Lady Sketch Show's fourth and final season.

Moore's rap song "One Margarita" went viral in 2023. The song spawned two remixes, one with Saucy Santana and the other with Flo Milli, Sexyy Red, and FendiDa Rappa. Cindy Crawford appeared in the music video.

Moore starred in Felicia Pride's short film Look Back At It (2024) as a single mom re-entering the dating scene.

== Personal life ==
Moore was raised in Lexington, Kentucky. She received her bachelor's degree from University of Kentucky.

She and her husband have four children.

== Accolades ==
- 2023 – Lyman T. Johnson Award Recipient, University of Kentucky
- 2023 – Nominee, Outstanding Comedic Actress (Short Form), Micheaux Film Festival (for Look Back At It)
- 2024 – Winner, NAACP Image Award for Outstanding Social Media Personality
