= Dicktown =

Dicktown may refer to:

- Dicktown, New York, a ghost town
- Dicktown (TV series), an American adult animated sitcom
