= Black Reel Award for Outstanding Actress, Comedy Series =

Annual US television award

- Awarded for: Outstanding Actress, Comedy Series
- Country: United States
- Presented by: Black Reel Awards for Television
- First award: 2017
- Currently held by: Robin Thede, A Black Lady Sketch Show (2021)
- Website: blackreelawards.com

This article lists the winners and nominees for the Black Reel Award for Television for Outstanding Actress, Comedy Series. This category was first introduced in 2017 and won by Issa Rae for Insecure. Rae leads the pack with most wins with 4 (consecutively). Tracee Ellis Ross is currently the most nominated actor with 5 nominations. In 2023, the Outstanding Actor and Outstanding Actress categories were combined into one Outstanding Performance category.

== Winners and nominees ==
Winners are listed first and highlighted in bold.

=== 2010s ===
Year	Actress	Series	Network	Ref
2017
2017	**Issa Rae**	**Insecure**	**HBO**	
2017	Michaela Coel	Chewing Gum	E4/ Netflix	
2017	Tracee Ellis Ross	Black-ish	ABC	
2017	Logan Browning	Dear White People	Netflix	
2017	Gina Rodriguez	Jane the Virgin	The CW	
2018
2018	**Issa Rae**	**Insecure**	**HBO**	
2018	Tracee Ellis Ross	Black-ish	ABC	
2018	Tiffany Haddish	The Last O.G.	TBS	
2018	Logan Browning	Dear White People	Netflix	
2018	Yara Shahidi	Grown-ish	Freeform	
2019
2019	**Issa Rae**	**Insecure**	**HBO**	
2019	Tracee Ellis Ross	Black-ish	ABC	
2019	Regina Hall	Black Monday	Showtime	
2019	Tiffany Haddish	The Last O.G.	TBS	
2019	DeWanda Wise	She's Gotta Have It	Netflix	

=== 2020s ===
Year	Actress	Series	Network	Ref
2020
2020	**Issa Rae**	**Insecure**	**HBO**	
2020	Tracee Ellis Ross	Black-ish	ABC	
2020	Zoe Kravitz	High Fidelity	HULU	
2020	Rashida Jones	blackAF	Netflix	
2020	Logan Browning	Dear White People	Netflix	
2021
2021	**Robin Thede**	**A Black Lady Sketch Show**	**HBO**	
2021	Tracee Ellis Ross	Black-ish	ABC	
2021	Renée Elise Goldsberry	Girls5eva	Peacock	
2021	Yara Shahidi	grown-ish	Freeform	
2021	Bresha Webb	Run the World	Starz	
2022
2022	**Quinta Brunson**	**Abbott Elementary**	**ABC**	
2022	Regina Hall	Black Monday	Showtime	
2022	Issa Rae	Insecure	HBO	
2022	Tracee Ellis Ross	Black-ish	ABC	
2022	Robin Thede	A Black Lady Sketch Show	HBO	

== Superlatives ==
Superlative	Outstanding Actress, Comedy Series
Actress with most awards	Issa Rae (4)
Actress with most nominations	Tracee Ellis Ross (6)
Actress with most nominations without ever winning	Tracee Ellis Ross (6)

== Programs with multiple awards ==
4 awards

- Insecure

== Performers with multiple awards ==
4 awards

- Issa Rae (4 consecutive)

== Programs with multiple nominations ==
6 nominations

- Black-ish

5 nominations

- Insecure

3 nominations

- Dear White People

2 nominations

- Grown-ish
- The Last O.G.

== Performers with multiple nominations ==
6 nominations

- Tracee Ellis Ross

5 nominations

- Issa Rae

3 nominations

- Logan Browning

2 nominations

- Tiffany Haddish
- Yara Shahidi

== Total awards by network ==
- HBO - 5
