= Alicia Sable =

American actress

- Born: Alicia Sable; Giles County, Virginia, U.S.
- Occupations: Actress, singer
- Years active: 2005–present

Alicia Sable is an American actress. She is known for playing Tammy Stackhouse in the Amazon television series Alpha House (2013–14), and Goldie Page in the film The Notorious Bettie Page (2005).

== Biography ==
Sable was born in Giles County, Virginia, the daughter of Gail Sable, a kindergarten teacher, and David Sable, director of Special Education and Testing for the Radford City Schools; she is married to Dr. Peter Ehren Sterbutzel. She has a music degree from Radford University.

== Filmography ==
=== Film ===
Year	Title	Role	Notes
2016	Love on the Run	Salesgirl	
2005	The Notorious Bettie Page	Goldie Page	

=== Television ===
Year	Title	Role	Notes
2016	Brooklynification (web series)	Lisa Ackerman	2 episodes
2014	It Could Be Worse (TV miniseries)	Herself	
2013-2014	Alpha House	Tammy Stackhouse	19 episodes
2010	Louie	College Girl #2	
