= Magnet Theater =

Improv theater in New York City

Coordinates: 40°44′55.6″N 73°59′43″W

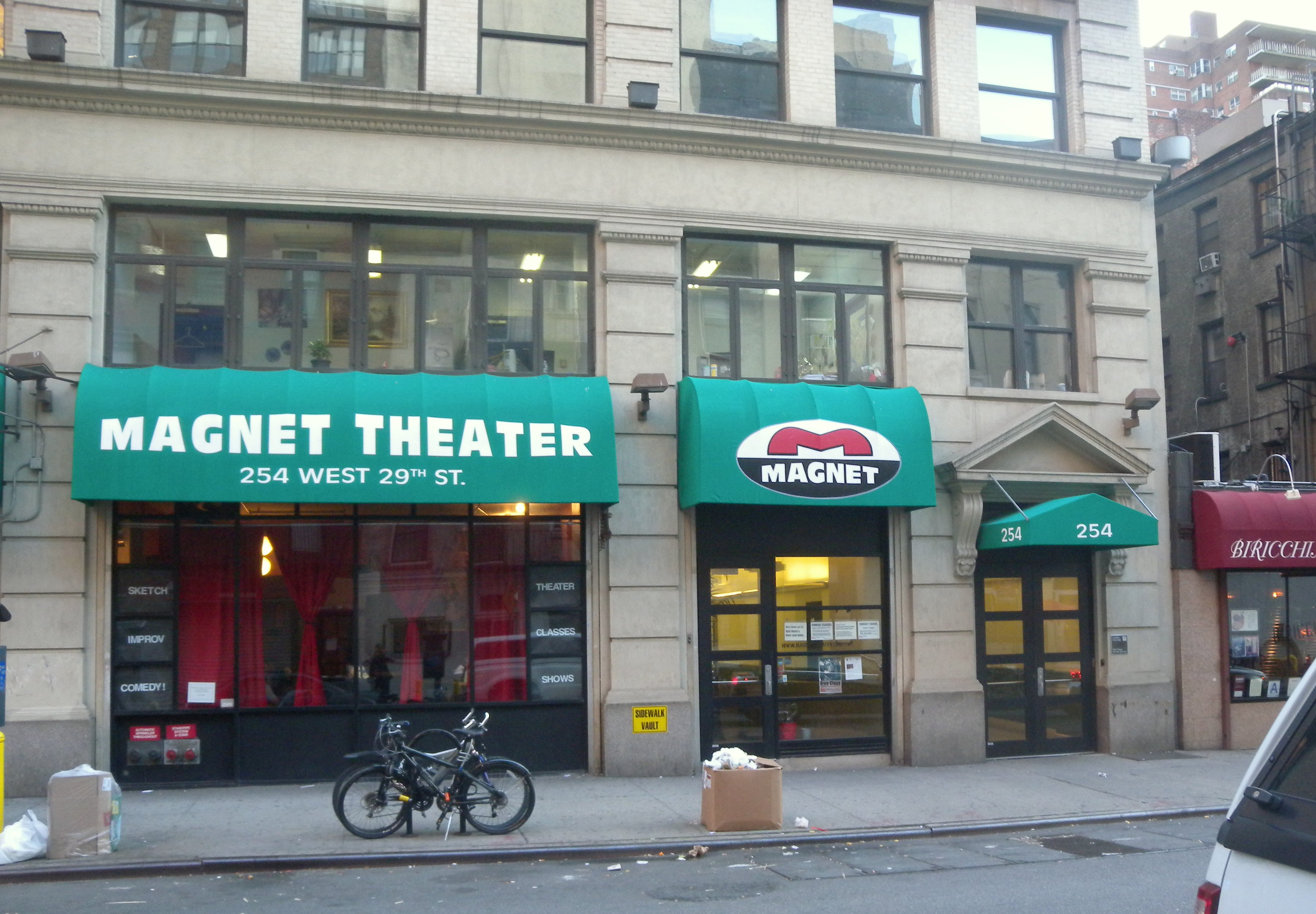
- Interactive map of Magnet Theater
- Address: 254 West 29th Street; New York City; United States
- Owner: Armando Diaz and Ed Herbstman

Construction
- Opened: March 2005

Website
- www.magnettheater.com

The Magnet Theater is an improvisational comedy theatre and improv school in New York City.

The Magnet Theater was founded in March 2005 by Armando Diaz, Ed Herbstman, Shannon Manning, and Alex Marino. Diaz, Manning and Herbstman were friends from Chicago, where they studied under improv guru Del Close at Improv Olympic. Diaz also co-founded the Peoples Improv Theater, where Herbstman taught. Armando Diaz and Sean Taylor currently own and operate Magnet Theater.

The Magnet offers performance and writing classes to people of all experience levels.

The Magnet, considered to be the world epicenter of musical improvisation, is also home to the New York Musical Improv Festival founded by T.J. Mannix and Co-Produced by Robin Rothman. Celebrating its 11th annual event virtually in July 2020, NYMIF brings together hundreds of musical improvisors and musicians from Austin to Boston, Chicago to L.A., Toronto to Vancouver and beyond. Performers have included Baby Wants Candy, Broadway's Bloody Bloody Andrew Jackson, The Improvised Sondheim Project, members of Freestyle Love Supreme and North Coast.

Many Magnet instructors and performers write and lend their voices to The Truth.

== See also ==
- Peoples Improv Theater
- Upright Citizens Brigade Theatre
