= All Def Digital =

American digital media company

- Trade name: All Def
- Industry: Digital media
- Founded: 2013; 13 years ago
- Founder: Russell Simmons
- Headquarters: Los Angeles, California, United States
- Key people: Sanjay Sharma (president and CEO, until 2017); Chris Blackwell (president and CEO, until 2019); Cedric J. Rogers (CEO, Culture Genesis)
- Products: Online video, television, live events
- Owner: Russell Simmons (2013–2019); Culture Genesis (2019–present)

All Def Digital, also known as All Def, is an American digital media company focused on hip-hop, comedy, social justice, spoken word, and Black and urban culture. It was founded in 2013 by Russell Simmons, the co-founder of Def Jam Recordings, and grew from a YouTube network into a multi-platform studio that produced programming for HBO, Spotify, and Facebook. Amid sexual assault allegations from multiple women, Simmons left the company in 2017; he has denied the allegations. All Def Digital eliminated its entire workforce with no warning in July 2019, then entered an insolvency process by year's end. Culture Genesis, a Santa Monica digital studio, purchased the company's assets in December 2019 and relaunched the brand.

== History ==
=== Founding and growth (2013–2016) ===
Simmons and producer Brian Robbins introduced All Def Digital at the Consumer Electronics Show in January 2013, after YouTube agreed in October 2012 to fund the channel as part of its investment in original programming. The company launched that year as a YouTube network in collaboration with AwesomenessTV, the online network founded by Robbins that was then owned by DreamWorks Animation, and expanded into original programming across multiple platforms.

All Def Digital raised a $5 million Series A round led by Greycroft in August 2014. The company also formed ADHD, a branded-content studio, in April 2016. That June, the company closed a $10 million Series B round led by Allen DeBevoise's Third Wave Digital Partners, with participation from WPP Ventures, Andreessen Horowitz, Greycroft, e.ventures, and Shari Redstone's Advancit Capital, bringing its total funding to approximately $18 million. At the time, the company said its content reached more than 100 million fans per month across YouTube and Facebook.

=== All Def Movie Awards ===
In February 2016, amid the #OscarsSoWhite controversy over the lack of diversity among Academy Award acting nominees, All Def Digital staged the first All Def Movie Awards, a ceremony recognizing Black talent in films that the Oscars had overlooked. The event was hosted by Tony Rock, whose brother Chris Rock hosted that year's Oscars, and its Best Picture nominees included Straight Outta Compton, Creed, Beasts of No Nation, Chi-Raq, Concussion, and Dope. Straight Outta Compton won Best Picture, Michael B. Jordan won Best Actor for Creed, and Will Smith received a lifetime achievement award. A highlights special aired on the cable channel Fusion opposite the Academy Awards telecast. Simmons discussed the ceremony on NPR, describing it as a celebration of overlooked talent rather than a protest.

=== Programming ===
All Def Digital developed content for a range of distributors beyond its own channels. Its projects included All Def Comedy, a stand-up series for HBO; Traffic Jams, a 2017 Spotify series that brought together producers and performers for unscripted recording sessions inside a moving SUV; World Star TV for linear television; and the digitally released feature film Major Deal. In 2016, the company expanded its HBO relationship into a first-look deal and reached programming agreements with Spotify and Seeso, NBCUniversal's online comedy service. Its recurring online series included Dad Jokes, Great Taste, Arts & Raps, and the music game show Bar Exam. Comedians who worked with All Def included Kevin Fredericks (professionally known as KevOnStage) and Anthony "DoBoy" Belcher Jr. The company's daily series The Drop was hosted by comedians Tahir Moore and Megan "MegScoop" Thomas. Teddy Ray acted in several of All Def's YouTube shows and performed on HBO's All Def Comedy.

=== Decline and shutdown (2017–2019) ===
President and CEO Sanjay Sharma left the company in September 2017 to start his own venture, and day-to-day management passed to Osman Eralp, a longtime Simmons associate. Simmons announced in November 2017 that he would step back from All Def Digital and his other businesses after several women accused him of sexual assault. He denied wrongdoing, saying he did not want his involvement to become a distraction. Chris Blackwell later led the company as president and CEO, and said that Simmons had held no ownership interest in the company since early 2018.

On July 2, 2019, All Def Digital laid off nearly its entire staff without warning. Rolling Stone reported that six former employees blamed the company's collapse on mismanagement and described a toxic work culture that they said persisted after Simmons's departure; according to the former employees, the staff had shrunk from about 60 people to 15 before the shutdown. Blackwell told Variety that the company was not folding but was reorganizing ahead of a strategic deal. The company subsequently entered an assignment for the benefit of creditors, an insolvency process, with the accounting firm Armanino managing the sale of its assets; some contractors and freelancers were reportedly left unpaid.

=== Acquisition by Culture Genesis (2019–present) ===
Culture Genesis bought All Def Digital's assets in December 2019 for an undisclosed price, gaining its brand rights, video library, and social accounts. None of the company's former staff were part of the deal. Cedric J. Rogers, a former Apple executive, and Shaun Newsum, a former Vevo executive, started Culture Genesis in February 2018; its investors include rapper T.I., Grand Hustle Records founder Jason Geter, basketball player Baron Davis, Betaworks, and Mucker Capital. Culture Genesis said it would revive shows including Dad Jokes, Great Taste, and Arts & Raps, while also developing original projects, among them a video adaptation of T.I.'s podcast ExpediTIously. Rogers said that Culture Genesis was already working with former All Def performers, including Fredericks and Belcher.

In January 2020, Culture Genesis secured the rights to sell advertising directly on YouTube for its own channels, which include the All Def network. Through All Def, the company operates more than ten YouTube channels spanning categories such as women's content, comedy, and cannabis. Rogers said the arrangement made Culture Genesis the only Black-owned network and publisher with that capability, and the company reported $5 million in revenue following the change.

In June 2023, Culture Genesis and the creator company Jellysmack launched a $25 million initiative aimed at BIPOC creators, extending Jellysmack's catalog licensing arrangements and direct financing to the more than 120 creators and publishers working with Culture Genesis, a list that included Patrick Cloud and Steve Harvey. The companies pointed to research by Group Black and Nielsen showing that Black creators were paid as much as 35 percent less than their non-Black counterparts even though their audiences were bigger and interacted more with their content.

In January 2024, BuzzFeed made Culture Genesis its advertising sales partner for multicultural content, letting the network package BuzzFeed brands such as Cocoa Butter and HuffPost's Voices for sale in combination with its own ad inventory. Some Black media executives questioned whether such arrangements rerouted advertising money that agencies had set aside for Black-owned publishers to larger companies that are not minority-owned.
