= A Black Lady Sketch Show =

American sketch comedy series

- Genre: Sketch comedy
- Created by: Robin Thede
- Starring: Robin Thede; Ashley Nicole Black; Gabrielle Dennis; Quinta Brunson; Skye Townsend; Laci Mosley; DaMya Gurley; Tamara Jade; Angel Laketa Moore
- Opening theme: "Hot Girl" by Megan Thee Stallion (season 1) "Fine Azz" by KaMillion (season 2) "Fortune" by Tia P (season 3) "I Told Em" by Doechii (season 4)
- Composers: Amanda Delores; Patricia Jones
- Country of origin: United States
- Original language: English
- No. of seasons: 4
- No. of episodes: 24

Production
- Executive producers: Issa Rae; Robin Thede; Dave Becky; Jonathan Barry; Tony Hernandez; Brooke Posch
- Running time: 25–29 minutes
- Production companies: HBO Entertainment; For Better or Words Inc.; Issa Rae Productions (season 1); Hoorae Media (season 2–4); Jax Media; 3 Arts Entertainment

Original release
- Network: HBO
- Release: August 2, 2019 – May 19, 2023

A Black Lady Sketch Show is an American sketch comedy television series created by Robin Thede for HBO. The show consists of comedy sketches performed by a main cast of Black women, consisting of producer and creator Thede, Gabrielle Dennis, and Skye Townsend. Alumni cast members include Quinta Brunson, Laci Mosley, and Ashley Nicole Black. The show has featured guest stars such as Issa Rae, Vanessa Williams, Angela Bassett, Laverne Cox, Nicole Byer, Amber Riley, Miguel, Omarion, Raven-Symoné, Kelly Rowland, Tia Mowry, Tahj Mowry, Gabrielle Union, Kyla Pratt, Wanda Sykes, Yvette Nicole Brown and Patti LaBelle.

A Black Lady Sketch Show premiered with a season of six episodes on August 2, 2019, to "universal acclaim" according to review aggregator Metacritic. The first season received a 2020 TCA Award for Outstanding Achievement in Sketch/Variety Shows and season two won three Black Reel Awards. Seasons one and two hold a 100% rating on Rotten Tomatoes.

The second season premiered April 23, 2021 after being delayed due to the COVID-19 pandemic. In May 2021, the series was renewed for a third season, which debuted on April 8, 2022. In June 2022, the series was renewed for a fourth season, which premiered on April 14, 2023. In July 2023, the series was cancelled after four seasons.

== Cast ==
=== Main cast ===
Actor	Season			
Actor	1	2	3	4
Robin Thede	Main	Main	Main	Main
Ashley Nicole Black	Main	Main	Main	
Gabrielle Dennis	Main	Main	Main	Main
Quinta Brunson	Main		Guest	
Skye Townsend		Featured	Main	Main
Laci Mosley		Featured		
DaMya Gurley				Featured
Tamara Jade				Featured
Angel Laketa Moore				Featured

=== Recurring guest stars ===
Guest stars that have appeared in multiple episodes.

- Essence Atkins
- Bob the Drag Queen
- Yvette Nicole Brown
- Nicole Byer
- David Alan Grier
- Jackée Harry
- Broderick Hunter
- Phil LaMarr
- Kel Mitchell
- Omarion
- Yvonne Orji
- Kyla Pratt
- Natasha Rothwell
- Issa Rae
- Amber Riley
- Holly Walker
- Tyler James Williams

== Episodes ==
Season	Episodes	Originally released	
Season	Episodes	First released	Last released
1	6	August 2, 2019	September 6, 2019
2	6	April 23, 2021	May 28, 2021
3	6	April 8, 2022	May 13, 2022
4	6	April 14, 2023	May 19, 2023

=== Season 1 (2019) ===
No. overall	No. in season	Title	Directed by	Written by	Original release date	U.S. viewers (millions)
1	1	"Angela Bassett Is the Baddest Bitch"	Dime Davis	Lauren Ashley Smith, Robin Thede, Ashley Nicole Black, Akilah Green, Brittani Nichols, Amber Ruffin, Rae Sanni and Holly Walker	August 2, 2019	0.334
Series premiere. Two women seek an escape from an ominous fog. 1960s soul group Claude and The Boppers perform their hit song "Ice Cream Shop". A world-renowned author and "philosophizer" promotes her latest masterclass. Maya's confession in a support group gets a less-than-supportive response. Trinity, the Invisible Spy, meets a formidable adversary. Drea confronts a mysterious woman stealing her dance moves at a club. Fun and games lead to tension, as Robin, Ashley, Quinta and Gabrielle are stuck in a house after an end-of-the-world event. Guest Starring: Angela Bassett, Nicole Byer, Laverne Cox, Phil LaMarr, Yvonne Orji, Kelly Rowland, Gina Torres, Amara La Negra
2	2	"Your Boss Knows You Don't Have Eyebrows"	Dime Davis	Lauren Ashley Smith, Robin Thede, Ashley Nicole Black, Akilah Green, Brittani Nichols, Amber Ruffin, Rae Sanni and Holly Walker	August 9, 2019	0.308
A perpetually late-to-work Shayla decides to forgo her morning makeup routine, to her coworker Toni's dismay. Trinity the Invisible Spy hunts down The Recluse, an elusive villain with a surprising identity. An array of average, awkward contestants perform before a panel of judges at the Basic Ball. Security guard Fatimah helps an office worker investigate who stole her missing mug. Robin, Quinta and Gabrielle uncover a shocking truth about Ashley's nighttime ritual. Guest Starring: Nicole Byer, Loretta Devine, Aja Naomi King, Caldwell Tidicue, Lena Waithe
3	3	"3rd & Bonaparte Is Always in the Shade"	Dime Davis	Lauren Ashley Smith, Robin Thede, Ashley Nicole Black, Akilah Green, Brittani Nichols, Amber Ruffin, Rae Sanni and Holly Walker	August 16, 2019	0.351
Asia is shocked by a very public, very unexpected marriage proposal from her new boyfriend DeWayne. New recruits talk about their goals and expectations at a gang orientation. A church service devolves when congregants take to the mic with self-centered motivations. Dr. Haddassah Olayinka Ali-Youngman turns a toast at her sister's wedding into a teachable moment. Gabrielle, Ashley, Quinta and Robin bond while discussing their ideal men and some of their worst dates. Guest Starring: Essence Atkins, Vanessa Bell Calloway, Jermaine Fowler, Marla Gibbs, David Alan Grier, Jackée Harry, Issa Rae, Sheryl Lee Ralph, Hal Williams, Larry Wilmore, Preacher Lawson, Daniele Gaither
4	4	"Where Are My Background Singers?"	Dime Davis	Lauren Ashley Smith, Robin Thede, Ashley Nicole Black, Akilah Green, Brittani Nichols, Amber Ruffin, Rae Sanni and Holly Walker	August 23, 2019	0.332
A divorce party spirals out of control following Eboni's bad mushroom trip. The tragic tale of star-crossed lovers, Rome & Julissa. A 1930's groupie, Feather Atwood, sets her sights on Negro league baseball player Satchel Paige. A frustrated airline passenger seeks a like-minded customer service representative. Denise tries to prevent yet another breakup and its typical, unusual side effect. "Taskmaster," "Insecurity" and "Turnt" help Crystal navigate a possible cat-calling situation. Quinta, Gabrielle, Robin and Ashley lay down odd rules while playing cards to pass the time. Guest Starring: Patti LaBelle, Phil LaMarr, Tia Mowry, Issa Rae, Natasha Rothwell, Tyler James Williams
5	5	"Why Are Her Pies Wet, Lord?"	Dime Davis	Lauren Ashley Smith, Robin Thede, Ashley Nicole Black, Akilah Green, Brittani Nichols, Amber Ruffin, Rae Sanni and Holly Walker	August 30, 2019	0.278
Four friends on a camping trip unknowingly disprove a stereotype. A pastor tries to take back control of his church potluck. A flight attendant struggles to get compliance from newlyweds Chris and Lachel in the exit row. Elementary school students notice a change in their teacher Ms. Miller. Jackie receives a less-than-warm welcome when she returns to her hometown high school. Robin, Quinta, Ashley and Gabrielle discuss their weird turn-ons and stage an intervention. Guest Starring: Khandi Alexander, Deon Cole, David Alan Grier, Garrett Morris, Yvonne Orji, Issa Rae, Amber Riley
6	6	"Born at Night, But Not Last Night"	Dime Davis	Lauren Ashley Smith, Robin Thede, Ashley Nicole Black, Akilah Green, Brittani Nichols, Amber Ruffin, Rae Sanni and Holly Walker	September 6, 2019	0.255
Season One Finale. Two friends come to regret their decision to visit a new black-owned restaurant. A mother and daughter go toe-to-toe in the latest episode of "Get the Belt". "Taskmaster," "Turnt" and "Insecurity" help Krystal through a surprise hot-air balloon ride. Carl and Lori's "special guest" has very specific boundaries. A judge, bailiff, court reporter and attorneys celebrate their first ever all-black lady courtroom. Tensions rise between Ashley, Gabrielle, Quinta and Robin as the reality of their situation sinks in. Guest Starring: Yvette Nicole Brown, Lil Rel Howery, Phil LaMarr, Marsai Martin, Issa Rae, Amber Riley, Natasha Rothwell, Arjay Smith, Bresha Webb

=== Season 2 (2021) ===
No. overall	No. in season	Title	Directed by	Written by	Original release date	U.S. viewers (millions)
7	1	"But the Tilapias Are Fine Though, Right?"	Lacey Duke & Brittany Scott Smith	Lauren Ashley Smith, Robin Thede, Ashley Nicole Black, Akilah Green, Shenovia Large, Rae Sanni, Kristin Layne Tucker, Holly Walker, Kindsey Young, Charla Lauriston	April 23, 2021	0.215
Season 2 premiere. Dr. Haddassah Olayinka Ali-Youngman, Pre-PhD opines on the COVID-19 pandemic, national racial reckoning, and other social issues. Robin wakes up and realizes she is in a different apocalyptic scenario but this time with Ashley, Gabrielle, Skye, and Laci. Salina, informed by psychic Sabrina, goes to confront her old friend Ladonna, who ruined her life due to a 1996 game of MASH. An accidental joint bank robbery goes wrong. A woman's husband surprises her by taking her to her favorite restaurant, a male strip club. The all-Black lady courtroom is disrupted by a Black male lawyer. Guest starring: Omarion, Kim Coles, Laz Alonso, Tone Bell, Issa Rae, Yvette Nicole Brown
8	2	"So You Just Out Here Chloroforming Anybody?"	Lacey Duke & Brittany Scott Smith	Lauren Ashley Smith, Robin Thede, Ashley Nicole Black, Akilah Green, Shenovia Large, Rae Sanni, Kristin Layne Tucker, Holly Walker, Kindsey Young, Charla Lauriston	April 30, 2021	0.205
The Invisible Spy goes on a blind date. Robin, Skye, Gabrielle, Laci, and Ashley explore the warehouse where they've taken cover during the apocalypse. A group of women on a girls' trip are approached by a woman who claims to know them. A market research meeting with a Black women focus group proves difficult. A historian traces the origins of CP Time to a pair of 19th century Black ladies' encounter with zombies. An enthusiastic cycling instructor leads a class for recently single women. Bryanni steps up her twerk game to impress Deshawn at the club. Guest starring: Lance Gross, Ryan Michelle Bathe, Ayesha Curry, Wunmi Mosaku, Erica Ash, Amber Riley, Miguel
9	3	"Sister, May I Call You Oshun?"	Lacey Duke & Brittany Scott Smith	Lauren Ashley Smith, Robin Thede, Ashley Nicole Black, Akilah Green, Shenovia Large, Rae Sanni, Kristin Layne Tucker, Holly Walker, Kindsey Young, Charla Lauriston	May 7, 2021	0.247
Dr. Haddassah Olayinka Ali-Youngman hosts Gabrielle Union on her show Black Table Talk to discuss women in the workplace. Robin becomes suspicious of Skye and the amenities in the warehouse. Chris mourns his divorce at his sister's gender reveal party. Three women complain about their seats at the Last Supper of Jesus and his apostles. The ladies discover a cache of money and passports in the warehouse. LeeLee tries to hide the state of her hair for an impromptu booty call. Portia Coché takes offense when the take-out cashier only includes a single set of plasticware with her order. Guest starring: Gabrielle Union, Richard T. Jones, Broderick Hunter, Jesse Williams
10	4	"My Booty Look Juicy, Don't It?"	Lacey Duke & Brittany Scott Smith	Lauren Ashley Smith, Robin Thede, Ashley Nicole Black, Akilah Green, Shenovia Large, Rae Sanni, Kristin Layne Tucker, Holly Walker, Kindsey Young, Charla Lauriston	May 14, 2021	N/A
A woman lays down to sleep but realizes she has an intruder. The Coral Reefs gang goes on a meditation retreat. Reesa's 35th birthday celebration is interrupted by the Fairy Aunt Mother. Skye confesses that there is a communication system in the warehouse. Ally's friends hold an intervention for her overly supportive behavior. Concert-goers enjoy singer Nona Love's performance.
11	5	"If I'm Paying These Chili's Prices, You Cannot Taste My Steak!"	Lacey Duke & Brittany Scott Smith	Lauren Ashley Smith, Robin Thede, Ashley Nicole Black, Akilah Green, Shenovia Large, Rae Sanni, Kristin Layne Tucker, Holly Walker, Kindsey Young, Charla Lauriston	May 21, 2021	N/A
Using the phrase "I wish a nigga would" has unexpected consequences. The TV competition Sit Down Somewhere Classic (1982) follows high school freshman Ceecee trying to find a place to sit in the lunchroom. A manicurist tries to up-sell her client. Upon the realization that everyone on Earth has died in the apocalypse, the ladies hold a Presidential debate. Inspirationalist Karlie Chanel holds a motivational speaking seminar. The subject of a meme gets revenge on the person who made the Tweet go viral. The Wigzard of Oz salon offers a high-quality experience to its clients. Guest starring: Affion Crockett, Skai Jackson, Elise Neal
12	6	"Way to Ruin the Party, Soya!"	Lacey Duke & Brittany Scott Smith	Lauren Ashley Smith, Robin Thede, Ashley Nicole Black, Akilah Green, Shenovia Large, Rae Sanni, Kristin Layne Tucker, Holly Walker, Kindsey Young, Charla Lauriston	May 28, 2021	N/A
Workplace compliments end in a fire. Skye tries to convince the other ladies not to leave the warehouse after a heated argument. Olivia attends a post-date press conference. Two thick women at a party deal with wearing the same outfit. A genie appears to mark the occasion of a group of Black people perfectly splitting the check. Two teams debate which role should have won Denzel Washington's first Best Actor Academy Award. The 2021 Brown Family Reunion includes judgmental aunties and classic line dances. Guest starring: Tony Baker, Kevin Fredericks, Phil Morris, Amber Riley, Danielle Pinnock, Reagan Gomez, Tyler James Williams, Kim Wayans, Algee Smith

=== Season 3 (2022) ===
No. overall	No. in season	Title	Directed by	Written by	Original release date	U.S. viewers (millions)
13	1	"Save My Edges, I'm a Donor!"	Bridget Stokes	Tracey Ashley, Robin Thede, Alrinthea Carter, Sonia Denis, Michelle Davis, Jonterri Gadson, Chloé Hilliard, Shenovia Large, Natalie McGill	April 8, 2022	N/A
Crowds of Black women attend a hair product purge at the local beauty supply. Robin, Skye, Ashley, and Gabrielle awaken in a penthouse to find that an unknown kidnapper manipulated their perception of the end of the world. Dr. Hadassah Olayinka Ali-Youngman, pre-PhD visits Luther Vandross Diversity Academy for Career Day. A TV repairwoman pitches her show Trey's Anatomy to Ava DuVernay. Three scientists in 1968 manipulate the space time continuum by slapping each other into the past and future. The coach of the Mississippi Central track team shares the secret behind the team's success. Keisha bombs at a local comedy club's open mic night. Guest starring: Kyla Pratt, Holly Robinson Peete, Michaela Jaé Rodriguez, Jemele Hill, Michael Ealy, Kel Mitchell, Ava DuVernay, Cari Champion, Wanda Sykes, David Alan Grier
14	2	"Anybody Have Something I Can Flog Myself With?"	Bridget Stokes	Tracey Ashley, Robin Thede, Alrinthea Carter, Sonia Denis, Michelle Davis, Jonterri Gadson, Chloé Hilliard, Shenovia Large, Natalie McGill	April 15, 2022	N/A
A school teacher discusses her boyfriend with her students, who think she may be a victim of catfishing. In Biblical times, Mary Magdalene and her friends await the resurrection of Jesus. A woman takes very seriously the spiritual quotes she has on wall art throughout her house. A security officer calls the bomb squad to help her defuse a bomb that is ready to explode. A funeral transforms into a ball with guests voguing.
15	3	"Y'all Want Some Blood Juice?"	Bridget Stokes	Tracey Ashley, Robin Thede, Alrinthea Carter, Sonia Denis, Michelle Davis, Jonterri Gadson, Chloé Hilliard, Shenovia Large, Natalie McGill	April 22, 2022	N/A
The weather forecast on "Turn Up Tulsa" focuses on how the weather will affect hair. At Toni's Bachelorette Party, the owner of a pomade product is the surprise male entertainer. Two mothers get into an argument during their daughters' Spelling Bee. At a Housewarming Party, the homeowners try to defend the decision to choose their house. At a painting class, a teacher is desperately looking for friendship. Guest starring: Tommy Davidson, Trevor Jackson
16	4	"Bounce Them Coochies, Y'all!"	Bridget Stokes	Tracey Ashley, Robin Thede, Alrinthea Carter, Sonia Denis, Michelle Davis, Jonterri Gadson, Chloé Hilliard, Shenovia Large, Natalie McGill	April 29, 2022	N/A
A jewel heist is complicated by an especially chatty and distracted thief. The host at a Singles Mixer likes talking in double negatives. A woman looking for lotion to help her ashy feet meets up with the Devil. Chefs compete on a game show to see who can come up with best excuse to miss their friend's birthday party. A woman will turn into a werewolf unless her friend helps her break the curse. Guest starring: Essence Atkins, Daphne Maxwell Reid, Jay Pharoah, Kimrie Lewis
17	5	"Peaches and Eggplants for Errbody!"	Bridget Stokes	Tracey Ashley, Robin Thede, Alrinthea Carter, Sonia Denis, Michelle Davis, Jonterri Gadson, Chloé Hilliard, Shenovia Large, Natalie McGill	May 6, 2022	N/A
Two astronauts crash land, but think they are on another planet. A lesbian couple adopts an adult, who one partner insists is really a three year old child. A tag-team wrestling match takes place among texting cliches. A woman appears in a political ad for an office in prison. Two women seem to be breaking up over what turns out to be an unusual reason. A lounge act duo are unable to finish a song because they are always arguing with each other. Guest starring: Raven-Symoné, Wayne Brady, Lala Milan, Lanisa Frederick
18	6	"It's a New Day, Africa America!"	Bridget Stokes	Tracey Ashley, Robin Thede, Alrinthea Carter, Sonia Denis, Michelle Davis, Jonterri Gadson, Chloé Hilliard, Shenovia Large, Natalie McGill	May 13, 2022	N/A
In a dark alley, a woman fights against a series of "hair villains." Dr. Haddassah Olayinka Ali-Youngman Pre-Phd becomes President of the United States, and explains that she used mind-control on the four black women who thought they were the last survivors of the end of the world. A college student coming out as gay to her parents mistakenly thinks that her parents are upset with her, when in fact they are upset with the tarantulas on the wall behind her. At a bonfire on the beach, friends argue over how one of them always celebrates her birthday in a dramatic way. An uncle and his nephew get into an argument playing Scrabble using racist words. A chipper camp guide can't get her students to enjoy camping. Trinity, the CIA's top agent foils a gang of gun thieves with the help of another woman distracting the men to exercise. Guest starring: Vanessa Williams, Lance Reddick, Quinta Brunson, John Marshall Jones, Tahj Mowry, Loni Love, Phil LaMarr, D.J. "Shangela" Pierce, Kalen Allen, Durand Bernarr

=== Season 4 (2023) ===
No. overall	No. in season	Title	Directed by	Written by	Original release date	U.S. viewers (millions)
19	1	"I'm Clapping From My Puss"	Bridget Stokes	Vannessa Jackson, Naima Pearce, Amber Singletary, Jonterri Gadson, Natalie McGill, Jazz Pitcairn, Corin Wells, Chloé Hilliard, and Monique Moses	April 14, 2023	N/A
Congresswomen debate banning using Instagram Live during bachelorette weekends. The music video premiere of Flewed Out's "Girls Trippin". Priscilla, Hannah, and the Good Samaritan run into the Three Wise Men on their way to see the birth of Christ. Sloane Nawford, noted for playing Mary Magdalene, is interviewed for Actors Behind the Lens Speaking Seriously. Loudmouth Gretchen threatens to ruin a casino heist. Salina Duplass finally tracks down LaDonna for a redo of MASH. Guest starring: Jay Ellis, Kel Mitchell, Tank, Omarion, Phil LaMarr
20	2	"What Kind of Medicine Does Dr. King Practice?"	Bridget Stokes	Vannessa Jackson, Naima Pearce, Amber Singletary, Jonterri Gadson, Natalie McGill, Jazz Pitcairn, Corin Wells, Chloé Hilliard, and Monique Moses	April 21, 2023	N/A
Kimber Zak and Skip Appeal host the Baptismal Dunk-A-Thon. Roxy Mentions and Anna return for a murder mystery party. For her work as Roxy Mentions, Lucinda Singletary is interviewed for Actors Behind the Lens Speaking Seriously. Coworkers vent in the bathroom talk show, "Shit Talk". A woman irritates others at the movies using speech to text. Two girls compete for a spot in a gifted pre-K program, one of whom insists she is three. Guest starring: Derek Fisher, Tahir Moore, Joshua Neal, Kyla Pratt, Leonard Robinson, Chloé Hilliard, Catherine Glandon, Nnamdi Ngwe
21	3	"Pre-Ph.D, Based on a Novel by Sapphire"	Bridget Stokes	Robin Thede, Vannessa Jackson, Naima Pearce, Amber Singletary, Jonterri Gadson, Natalie McGill, Jazz Pitcairn, Corin Wells, Chloé Hilliard, and Monique Moses	April 28, 2023	N/A
Two sorceresses face off on Curzuz. Black Table Talk returns with Colman Domingo as a guest. Inspirationalist Karlie Chanel pitches to TV executives. Known for her work as The Devil, Cookie Carusso is spotlighted for Actors Behind the Lens Speaking Seriously. Self-proclaimed "champion speedwalker" Deena Daleedah faces off against an old rival. As a daughter prepares for marriage, her mother hands down the family heirlooms. Guest starring: Colman Domingo, D-Nice, Kym Whitley, Debra Wilson, Monique Moses
22	4	"My Love Language Is Words of Defamation"	Unknown	Vannessa Jackson, Naima Pearce, Amber Singletary, Jonterri Gadson, Natalie McGill, Jazz Pitcairn, Corin Wells, Chloé Hilliard, and Monique Moses	May 5, 2023	N/A
Host Dilly Bird records an episode of Fresh to Def: The Black Culture Murder Podcast. Former defendant Trina brings a case to the Black Lady Courtroom as a newly-barred attorney. Actors Behind the Lens Speaking Seriously highlights Jazzterri Jackalterri, known for her work as Shantira the Bailiff. Queen Gladys Knight leads a meeting of the Knights of the Roundtable. A pair of friends attending Mary J. Brunch are negged by their waitress. Engineers at the Fashion Nova Space Center attempt to guide a space rover back from space with new intern Chris. Guest Starring: Issa Rae, Yvette Nicole Brown, Jackée Harry, Kevin "KevOnStage" Fredericks
23	5	"Peek-a-Boob, Your Titty's Out"	Unknown	Vannessa Jackson, Naima Pearce, Amber Singletary, Jonterri Gadson, Natalie McGill, Jazz Pitcairn, Corin Wells, Chloé Hilliard, and Monique Moses	May 12, 2023	N/A
Characters on the sitcom Why You Ain't Say Nothing? wonder why they haven't intervened in a friend's bad relationship. Ladies in 1800s London look to intriguing fast fashion to solve their beauty dilemma for the royal feast. Cousin Curtis turns guests checking in at a hotel off, while concierge Keema trades escalating room charges (and tea) with hotel guest Simone with super-fast dialogue. Actors Behind the Lens Speaking Seriously highlights Tony Barnum&Bailey, known for his work as Cousin Curtis. A woman visiting home tries to masturbate without judgement. An auction house auctions off luxury lifestyle goals, for the price of your dreams, time, and friendships. Prehistoric drama abounds on The Real Housewives of B.C. Guest Starring: Bobby Brown, Gina Torres, Quincy Isaiah, Sam Richardson
24	6	"Check Yo' Slack Every 5 to Stay Alive"	Unknown	Vannessa Jackson, Naima Pearce, Amber Singletary, Jonterri Gadson, Natalie McGill, Jazz Pitcairn, Corin Wells, Chloé Hilliard, and Monique Moses	May 19, 2023	N/A
A PSA warns viewers against the dangers of corporate capitalization on Juneteenth. Gang members get in hot water for not keeping up with their Slack channel and encounter a rival gang intruding on their coworking space. Actors Behind the Lens Speaking Seriously highlights Noémie Marceau, known for her work as gang leader Elisa, but technical difficulties loom. The soap opera drama ramps up when a new hire comes between two work wives on The Bold and the Cubicle. A woman on a treasure hunt finds her shady friends trying to make off with their finds. A classically trained ballet dancer auditions for a rapper's latest video. Dr. Hadassah Olayinka Ali-Youngman reveals a nefarious plot to take over the world. Guest Starring: Issa Rae, Tracee Ellis Ross, James III, Phil LaMarr

== Production ==
=== Development ===
Official season 2 promotional poster.

In the summer of 2018, Robin Thede invited her close friends and fellow comedians Quinta Brunson, Ashley Nicole Black, and Gabrielle Dennis to help her develop a comedy series. Thede then pitched the series to HBO as a way to address the dearth of Black women's representation in the American comedic landscape. Thede was encouraged by HBO executives to push boundaries and take risks with the show.

The show was originally titled The Black Lady Sketch Show but the name was changed to communicate to audiences that the series is a single representation of Black women in comedy. The show is thought to be the first sketch comedy series written, produced by, and starring Black women.

On January 28, 2019, it was announced that HBO had ordered a half-hour sketch show, A Black Lady Sketch Show, written and created by Robin Thede. Issa Rae is the co-executive producer with Thede through Issa Rae Productions, known as Hoorae as of 2021. The season one director is Dime Davis. Season two was directed by Lacey Duke and Brittany Scott Smith. Bridget Murphy Stokes is the third season's director.

On August 27, 2019, HBO announced that A Black Lady Sketch Show had been renewed for a second season. Filming of the second season was put on hold due to the COVID-19 pandemic, but on March 23, 2021 it was announced that the six-episode season would premiere on April 23, 2021.

On May 24, 2021, HBO renewed the series for a third season.

On June 2, 2022, HBO renewed the series for a fourth season.

On July 6, 2023, it was announced that HBO cancelled the series after four seasons.

=== Casting ===
Official season 4 promotional poster.

On May 24, 2019, it was announced that the show would star Thede along with comediennes Ashley Nicole Black, Gabrielle Dennis, and Quinta Brunson. Angela Bassett, Gina Torres, and Marsai Martin were announced as three guest stars.

On March 23, 2021, it was announced that Brunson would not appear in season 2 due to scheduling conflicts. Additional changes for season 2 included the casting of Laci Mosley and Skye Townsend as main cast members. Confirmed guest stars include Gabrielle Union, Jesse Williams, Miguel, Skai Jackson, Laz Alonso, Omarion, Kim Wayans, Ayesha Curry, Lance Gross, and Wunmi Mosaku.

On March 2, 2022, it was announced that Mosley would not appear in season 3 due to scheduling conflicts. Guest appearances include Ava DuVernay, Michaela Jaé Rodriguez, Raven-Symoné, Wanda Sykes, David Alan Grier, Kyla Pratt, Jemele Hill, and Holly Robinson Peete.

New cast members Angel Laketa Moore, DaMya Gurley and Tamara Jade were announced for season 4 on March 21, 2023.

=== Writers ===
Lauren Ashley Smith was the show's head writer for the first two seasons. Additional writers for season one are Brittani Nichols, Rae Sanni, Holly Walker, Amber Ruffin and Akilah Green. Cast member Ashley Nicole Black also wrote for the show. It is the first television series to have a writer's room entirely composed of Black women. For the second season, Ruffin, and Nichols left the writer's room, and Kindsey Young, Shenovia Large, and Kristin Layne Tucker joined as additional writers. The season three writer's room retained Large and brought on new writers.

=== Release ===
The series premiered on August 2, 2019. The second season premiered on April 23, 2021 on HBO and HBO Max. Season three premiered on April 8, 2022. Season four premiered on April 14, 2023.

== Reception ==
=== Season 1 ===
The first season of A Black Lady Sketch Show received critical acclaim. On review aggregator website Rotten Tomatoes, the first season of A Black Lady Sketch Show holds an approval rating of 100%, with an average rating of 8.88/10 based on 20 reviews. The website's consensus reads, "Singular, subversive, and simply hilarious, A Black Lady Sketch Show finds universal humor in specific spaces to craft quick-witted sketches that perfectly showcase Robin Thede and her talented cast." According to review aggregator Metacritic, which uses a weighted average, the first season received an assigned score of 89 out of 100 based on reviews from 7 critics, indicating "universal acclaim". In a review by Ali Barthwell for The A.V. Club, she wrote, "A Black Lady Sketch Show possesses a confidence in its first season that suggests the show is not interested in being chopped up into easily consumable chunks. A Black Lady Sketch Show seems more interested in creating a whimsical, loving world for its leads." Writing for Vulture, Jen Chaney stated: "A Black Lady Sketch Show isn't just funny. Its sketches are consistently clever and surprising, often concluding with twist endings that add a whole other layer to the jokes that had us rolling a couple of minutes ago."

In 2020, the show became the first Black women-led sketch show to receive a Primetime Emmy Award nomination for Outstanding Variety Sketch Series.

=== Season 2 ===
The second season also received positive reception. It holds a score of 100% on Rotten Tomatoes based on eight critics' reviews. IndieWire journalist Kristen Lopez said that the season "once again delivers hilarity and absurdity in equal measure." Margaret Lyons of the New York Times wrote that the show "has such a fun ear for specifics and lyricism, and the new season grows seamlessly into itself; the show's recurring characters are back, and Robin Thede, its star and creator, is as dynamic as ever." Danette Chavez of The A.V. Club noted the show "has an air of reinvention" and "retains the cohesion, rapid-fire energy, and mix of culturally specific and universal humor that made the first season uproarious and a joy to watch."

The second season received five Emmy nominations, including Outstanding Variety Sketch Series and Outstanding Writing for a Variety Sketch Series. Daysha Broadway, Stephanie Filo, and Jessica Hernández received the Primetime Emmy Award for Outstanding Picture Editing for Variety Programming, the first all-women of color ensemble to receive the award in Emmy history. Season two was named to "best" year-end lists published by Paste, The A.V. Club, The Root, and NPR.

=== Season 3 ===
The season holds a 100% on Rotten Tomatoes based on six critics' reviews. Kristen Baldwin of EW rated the season an A− and hailed it as "consistently, ridiculously funny." Similarly, The A.V. Club's Jenna Scherer described the show: "In its third season, A Black Lady Sketch Show continues to blaze a trail as a show both by and for its titular demographic, unafraid to make cultural references that will gleefully whizz over the heads of white viewers." Scherer also complimented the chemistry of the cast members: "they share such an easy rapport, riffing off each other seemingly effortlessly whether the moment is scripted or improvised."

== Awards and nominations ==
Award	Year (Note: The listed year refers to the date of the ceremony.)	Category	Nominee	Result	Ref.
American Cinema Editors Awards	2022	Best Edited Variety Talk/Sketch Show or Special	Daysha Broadway, Stephanie Filo, and Jessica Hernández (for "Sister, May I Call You Oshun?")	Nominated	
American Cinema Editors Awards	2024	Best Edited Variety Talk/Sketch Show or Special	Stephanie Filo, Malinda Zehner Guerra, and Taylor Joy Mason (for "My Love Language Is Words of Defamation")	Nominated	
Art Directors Guild Awards	2022	Excellence in Production Design for a Variety, Reality or Competition Series	Cindy Chao and Michele Yu (for "If I'm Paying These Chili's Prices, You Cannot Taste My Steak!")	Nominated	
Art Directors Guild Awards	2023	Excellence in Production Design for a Variety, Reality or Competition Series	Cindy Chao, Michele Yu (for "Anybody Have Something I Can Flog Myself With?"; "Bounce Them Coochies, Y'All!"; "Peaches and Eggplants for Errbody!")	Nominated	
Art Directors Guild Awards	2024	Excellence in Production Design for a Variety, Reality or Competition Series	Cindy Chao, Michele Yu (for "I'm Clapping From My Puss", "What Kind of Medicine Does Dr. King Practice?", "Peek-A-Boob, Your Titty's Out")	Nominated	
Artios Awards	2021	Live Television Performance, Variety or Sketch Comedy	Victoria Thomas	Won	
Artios Awards	2024	Live Television Performance, Variety, or Sketch – Comedy, Drama, or Musical	Erica A. Hart	Won	
Black Reel Awards for Television	2021	Outstanding Comedy Series	A Black Lady Sketch Show	Won	
Black Reel Awards for Television	2021	Outstanding Actress, Comedy Series	Robin Thede	Won	
Black Reel Awards for Television	2021	Outstanding Supporting Actress, Comedy Series	Gabrielle Dennis	Won	
Black Reel Awards for Television	2022	Outstanding Variety, Talk or Sketch - Series or Special	Robin Thede	Won	
Black Reel Awards for Television	2022	Outstanding Actress, Comedy Series	Robin Thede	Nominated	
Black Reel Awards for Television	2022	Outstanding Guest Actress, Comedy Series	Quinta Brunson	Won	
Black Reel Awards for Television	2023	Outstanding Variety, Talk or Sketch - Series or Special	A Black Lady Sketch Show	Won	
Black Reel Awards for Television	2023	Outstanding Lead Performance, Comedy Series	Robin Thede	Nominated	
Black Reel Awards for Television	2023	Outstanding Guest Performance, Comedy Series	Issa Rae	Nominated	
Black Reel Awards for Television	2023	Outstanding Cinematography	Kevin Atkinson	Nominated	
Black Reel Awards for Television	2023	Outstanding Costume Design	Michelle Page Collins	Nominated	
Black Reel Awards for Television	2023	Outstanding Make Up and Hairstyling	Jacqueline Knowlton, Shavonne Brown	Nominated	
Celebration of Black Cinema and Television	2021	Showrunner	Robin Thede	Won	
Costume Designers Guild Awards	2023	Excellence in Variety, Reality-Competition, Live Television	Michelle Page (for "Peek-A-Boob, Your Titty's Out")	Won	
Hollywood Creative Alliance Creative Arts TV Awards	2023	Best Variety Series or Special	A Black Lady Sketch Show	Won	
Hollywood Critics Association TV Awards	2021	Best Broadcast Network or Cable Sketch Series, Variety Series, Talk Show, or Comedy/Variety Special	A Black Lady Sketch Show	Nominated	
Hollywood Critics Association TV Awards	2021	Best Actress in a Broadcast Network or Cable Series, Comedy	Robin Thede	Nominated	
Hollywood Critics Association TV Awards	2022	Best Broadcast Network or Cable Variety Sketch Series, Talk Series, or Special	A Black Lady Sketch Show	Won	
Hollywood Critics Association TV Awards	2023	Best Actress in a Broadcast Network or Cable Series, Comedy	Robin Thede	Nominated	
Primetime Emmy Awards	2021	Outstanding Variety Sketch Series	Robin Thede, Issa Rae, Tony Hernandez, Brooke Posch, Dave Becky, Jonathan Berry, Lauren Ashley Smith, Dime Davis, Deniese Davis, Montrel McKay, John Skidmore, and Linda Morel	Nominated	
Primetime Emmy Awards	2021	Outstanding Writing for a Variety Series	Lauren Ashley Smith, Robin Thede, Ashley Nicole Black, Akilah Green, Shenovia Large, Rae Sanni, Kristin Layne Tucker, Holly Walker, and Kindsey Young	Nominated	
Primetime Emmy Awards	2022	Outstanding Variety Sketch Series	Robin Thede, Issa Rae, Tony Hernandez, Brooke Posch, Dave Becky, Jonathan Berry, Tracey Ashley, Bridget Stokes, Chloé Hilliard, Deniese Davis, Montrel McKay, John Skidmore, and Linda Morel	Nominated	
Primetime Emmy Awards	2023	Outstanding Scripted Variety Series	A Black Lady Sketch Show	Nominated	
Primetime Creative Arts Emmy Awards	2020	Outstanding Variety Sketch Series	Robin Thede, Issa Rae, Tony Hernandez, Brooke Posch, Dave Becky, Jonathan Berry, Lauren Ashley Smith, Dime Davis, Deniese Davis, Montrel McKay, John Skidmore, and Erin Owens	Nominated	
Primetime Creative Arts Emmy Awards	2020	Outstanding Directing for a Variety Series	Dime Davis (for "Born at Night, But Not Last Night")	Nominated	
Primetime Creative Arts Emmy Awards	2020	Outstanding Guest Actress in a Comedy Series	Angela Bassett (for "Angela Bassett is the Baddest Bitch")	Nominated	
Primetime Creative Arts Emmy Awards	2021	Outstanding Guest Actress in a Comedy Series	Yvette Nicole Brown (for "But the Tilapias Are Fine Though, Right?")	Nominated	
Primetime Creative Arts Emmy Awards	2021	Outstanding Guest Actress in a Comedy Series	Issa Rae (for "My Booty Look Juicy, Don't It?")	Nominated	
Primetime Creative Arts Emmy Awards	2021	Outstanding Picture Editing for Variety Programming	Daysha Broadway, Stephanie Filo, and Jessica Hernández (for "Sister, May I Call You Oshun?")	Won	
Primetime Creative Arts Emmy Awards	2022	Outstanding Directing for a Variety Series	Bridget Stokes (for "Save My Edges, I'm A Donor!")	Won	
Primetime Creative Arts Emmy Awards	2022	Outstanding Writing for a Variety Series	Tracey Ashley, Robin Thede, Alrinthea Carter, Michelle Davis, Sonia Denis, Jonterri Gipson, Chloé Hilliard, Shenovia Large, and Natalie McGill	Nominated	
Primetime Creative Arts Emmy Awards	2022	Outstanding Picture Editing for Variety Programming	Stephanie Filo, Bradinn French, Taylor Joy Mason, and S. Robyn Wilson (for "Save My Edges, I'm A Donor!")	Won	
Primetime Creative Arts Emmy Awards	2022	Outstanding Production Design for a Variety, Reality or Competition Series	Cindy Chao, Michele Yu, and Lizzie Boyle (for "Anybody Have Something I Can Flog Myself With?")	Nominated	
Primetime Creative Arts Emmy Awards	2023	Outstanding Production Design for a Variety, Reality or Competition Series	Cindy Chao, Michele Yu, and Lizzie Boyle (for "Peek-A-Boob, Your Titty's Out")	Nominated	
Primetime Creative Arts Emmy Awards	2023	Outstanding Picture Editing for Variety Programming	Stephanie Filo, Malinda Zehner Guerra, Joy Mason (for "My Love Language is Words of Defamation")	Won	
Television Critics Association Awards	2020	Outstanding Achievement in Sketch/Variety Shows	A Black Lady Sketch Show	Won	
Television Critics Association Awards	2021	Outstanding Achievement in Variety, Talk or Sketch	A Black Lady Sketch Show	Nominated	
Television Critics Association Awards	2022	Outstanding Achievement in Variety, Talk or Sketch	A Black Lady Sketch Show	Nominated	
Television Critics Association Awards	2023	Outstanding Achievement in Variety, Talk or Sketch	A Black Lady Sketch Show	Nominated	
