= New York Musical Improv Festival =

American annual music improvisation festival

The New York Musical Improv Festival (NYMIF) is a four-day festival held every year at the Magnet Theater in New York City. Founded in 2009 by T.J. Mannix and producers Robin Rothman, Melanie Girton, and Mary Archbold, NYMIF celebrates a form of musical improvisation that developed at comedy theaters across the U.S. and Canada in the 2010s.

== Overview ==
The first NYMIF was created in 2009 to promote the art musical improv to wider audiences and bring together performers from all over the world. Musical improv has become more popular at improv theaters across the country with new programs starting every year. In New York City, musical house teams have become common at all of the major comedy theaters.

Past festivals have included teams and performers from cities across the US, (NYC, Chicago, Los Angeles, San Francisco, Denver, Boston, Minneapolis, Philadelphia, Austin TX, Washington DC, Baltimore, Raleigh, Pittsburgh, Miami, Providence and Seattle), Canada (Montreal and Vancouver), Frankfurt, Germany and Paris France! NYMIF has featured everything from an improvised rock concert to a fully costumed Dickensian musical, improvised hip-hop, college teams, duo and solo shows, improvised Sondheim and even the cast and band from Broadway’s Bloody Bloody Andrew Jackson and Jeff Hiller.

NYMIF teamed with Gildas Club raising money and awareness for women and families living with cancer. Previous Gilda Club benefits have featured people such as Cady Huffman, Orfeh, and Donna Vivino.
