= Lexi Allen =

American gospel singer (born 1967)

- Also known as: Lexi
- Born: Alexis Marie Nucklos; October 2, 1967 (age 58); Columbus, Ohio, U.S.
- Genres: Gospel · R&B
- Occupations: Singer-songwriter, producer, actress, comedian, television personality, screenwriter
- Instrument: Vocals
- Years active: 1989–present
- Labels: Malaco Music Group, Universal Music Group
- Spouse: Michael Dwayne Allen

YouTube information
- Channel: lexitelevision
- Years active: 2009–present
- Genres: Comedy; parody
- Subscribers: 342 thousand
- Views: 47.8 million
- Last updated: September 11, 2025

Alexis Marie Nucklos-Allen (born October 2, 1967), known professionally as Lexi Allen, is an American gospel singer, producer, actress, comedian, television personality, and screenwriter.

== Early life and education ==
Alexis Marie Nucklos was born in Columbus, Ohio, where she grew up singing in her grandfather's church. Nucklos is the daughter of physician Dr. Ruby Nucklos. She attended and graduated from Bowsher High School in Toledo. Nucklos later attended Bowling Green State University, where she majored in communications. During her freshman year in college, she was awarded the Ms. Bronze Pageant. In 1989, she became a member of Zeta Phi Beta.

== Career ==
For a time she sang background vocals for, among others, Gerald LeVert, Vanessa Bell Armstrong, and Fred Hammond. After the release of her debut album Call Her Lexi (1990) she stepped away from music, instead studying and working as a teacher, before renewing her singing career a decade later. Nucklos also married a music producer Michael Allen, who helped manage her musical career. During their marriage, Allen captured the attention of former boxing champion Evander Holyfield, who had set up the record label Real Deal Records. While signed onto Holyfield's label, Lexi released Lexi & That's the Way It Is (2002), A Praise in the Valley (2004) and What Heaven Hears (2005).

The 2004 album earned her a Stellar Gospel Music Award nomination. In 2006, Allen became the public face of The Word Network, where she presents the regular program "The Word Network Church with Lexi". She also hosted The Lexi Show, aired by The Word Network, on which she has interviewed such guests as B.Slade (then known as Tonex), Carlton Pearson, Shirley Caesar, DeWayne Woods and many others.

In 2010, The Lexi Show was suspended for nearly a year, soon after an interview in which Tonex spoke candidly about his same-sex attraction and his views on sexuality in general. The show returned in 2011, and later after a three-year hiatus, in 2015.

Her 2012 album Phenomenal was produced after she signed with Malaco Music Group. The singles "Burn It All Down" and "Abide" from this album hit the Billboard Hot Gospel Songs charts, peaking at #20 and #14 respectively.

Allen appears regularly on The Yolanda Adams Morning Show with the segment "Inside Inspiration with Lexi". On her YouTube channel, she has created comedy videos dealing with subjects such as church culture, African-American culture, and parodies of well-known TV shows. She also runs ALX Hair, a business selling hair extensions.

== Personal life ==
Allen was married to Michael Dwayne Allen; the couple have one child together, son Michael Alexander Osaze. Michael Dwayne Allen was diagnosed with cancer and ultimately succumbed to the disease on October 5, 2004.

== Discography ==
=== Albums ===
- Call Her Lexi (1990)
- Lexi & That's the Way It Is (2001)
- Somewhere Different (2002)
- A Praise in the Valley (2004)
- What Heaven Hears (2005)
- Phenomenal (2012)
- Just Listen (2018)

== Filmography ==
Television

- The Word Network Church With Lexi (2006)
- The Lexi Show (2010–2011; 2015)
- Churchy (2024–present)

YouTube Shows

- Holy Ghost Enforcers (2012–present)
- Ghetto Bewitched (2015–present)
