= Fred Newman (actor) =

American actor (b. 1952)

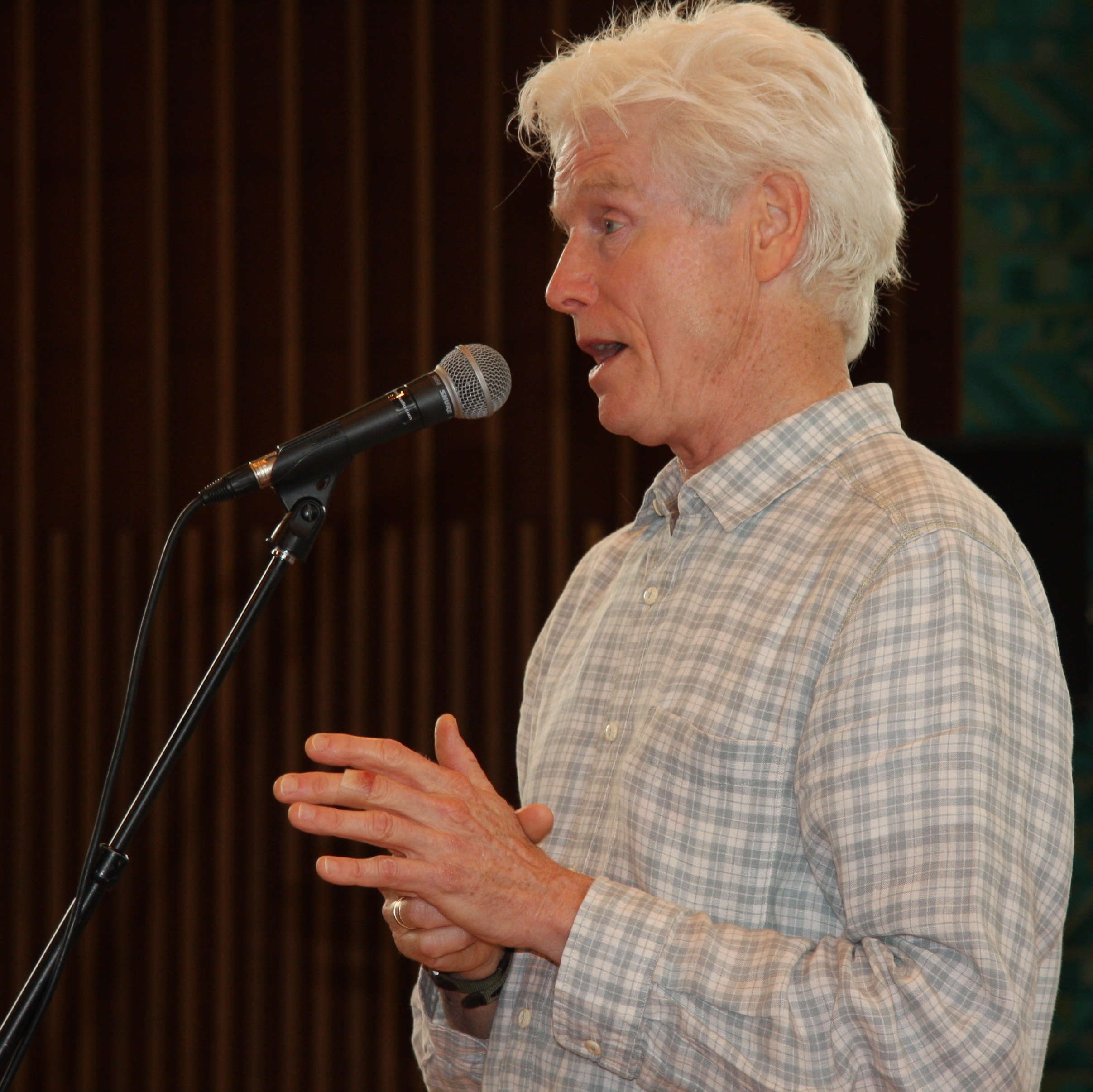
- Fred Newman in 2014
- Born: Frederick R. Newman; May 6, 1952 (age 74); LaGrange, Georgia, U.S.
- Occupations: Performer; sound effect artist; comedian; composer; singer; talk show host
- Years active: 1980–present
- Spouse: Katy Dobbs (m. 1985)
- Children: 2, including Lila Newman

Frederick R. Newman (born May 6, 1952) is an American actor, comedian, composer, sound effects artist both in person and for film, singer and former talk show host. Newman is known for his ability to make mouth sounds and is not a traditional Foley artist.

== Early life and education ==
Newman was born and raised in LaGrange, Georgia on a farm outside of the city. As a "snaggletooth, freckled" boy in rural Georgia, he spent a lot of time outside mimicking sounds, including honk sounds, drips, bubbles typewriters clicks, animal sounds, and helicopters.

He first learned a water drop when he was six by a 90 year old man named Snipes. A lot of the sounds he learned was inspired by different storytellers in Georgia, mainly African-American. One storyteller in particular was a man named Jack Fling. He also developed a talent for whistling as a boy, learning a double-whistle and often showing off to his family. He was a judge in 1982 for the International Whistlers Convention along with being Entertainer Of The Year.

He is a 1974 graduate of the University of Georgia, and received an MBA at Harvard Business School in 1978.

== Career ==
Newman's first job in New York City was at Newsweek. After doing comedy, Newman soon capitalized on his unique vocalizations, and Peter Workman (Workman Publishing) signed Fred to write the best-selling book MouthSounds (first published in 1980 with a vinyl record insert, and updated with a CD in 2004). Newman was an actor and sound-effects artist on Garrison Keillor's live radio variety show A Prairie Home Companion. In an audience favorite feature of the program, Keillor tells an apparently impromptu story that is funny because it requires Newman to strain to supply rapid-fire sound effects for unusual occurrences and obscure animals.

Newman was featured in an interview with Jane Pauley on CBS Sunday Morning and the segment was nominated for an Emmy.

He has also done character voices and sound effects in numerous film, television and video game credits, including Who Framed Roger Rabbit, Doug (as Skeeter Valentine, Porkchop, Mr. Dink, Stinky, and other characters), Grand Theft Auto 2, Harry and the Hendersons, Gremlins, Munchies, Storybook World, Elmo's World as a special guest on the episode "Mouths", Wolf and Men in Black.

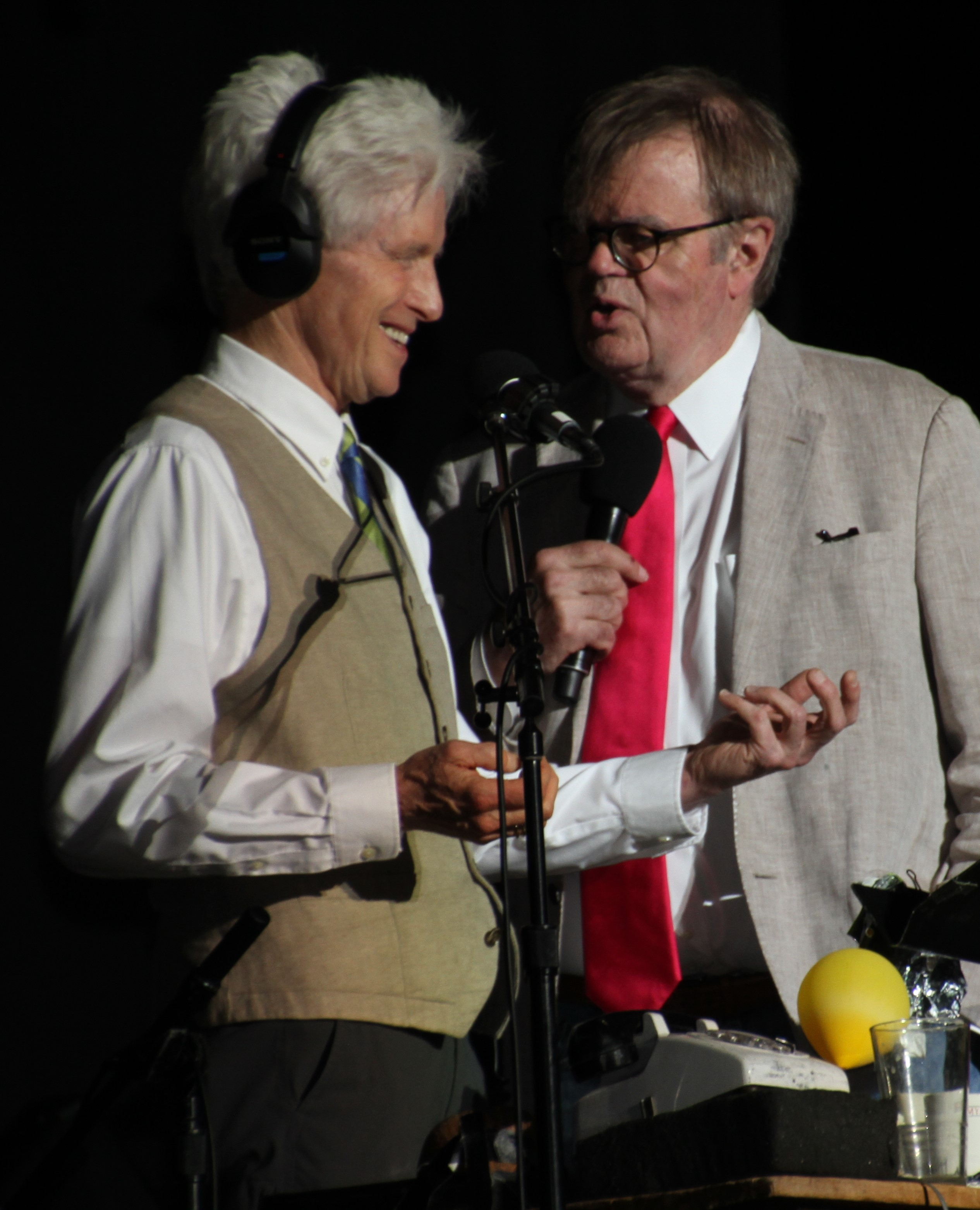
Newman performing with Garrison Keillor at the 2017 Minnesota State Fair

Newman hosted Livewire, a children's talk show on Nickelodeon in the early 1980s. Livewire was known for giving bands their first television appearance, including R.E.M. and Split Enz. He was also a host for Nickelodeon's Halloween TV special game, Nick or Treat!

Newman worked with Jim Henson and the Muppets in the 1980s, first as a contributor to Muppet Magazine, then as the writer of the Muppet Show On Tour live show. In 1987, Newman played the lead role in Henson's CBS sitcom pilot Puppetman. Newman also appeared in a 1988 Henson direct-to-video special called Neat Stuff to Know & to Do.

Prior to the 2000 Presidential Election, Newman was cast as the voice of Garry Trudeau's comic strip character Duke who ran for president. He provided both voice and motion capture for Duke 2000, a series of online animated shorts, and can still be heard in the "Ask Duke" interactive game. He also provided the voice of Trudeau's Jimmy Thudpucker character for a NetAid concert.

As an on-camera performer, he was the co-host (1989–1993) of The All New Mickey Mouse Club (1989–1994) (with Mowava Pryor or Terri Eoff Misner as the other co-host) that launched the careers of Britney Spears, Keri Russell, Justin Timberlake, Christina Aguilera, JC Chasez, and Ryan Gosling, among others. Newman can be seen on the PBS reading series Between the Lions, for which he also wrote and provided animated voices, and as the conductor on PBS' Lomax, the Hound of Music. Newman won two writing Emmys for Between the Lions. As a musician, he has composed music for the animated series Doug, PB&J Otter, and Stanley and wrote songs for Doug's 1st Movie. In 2015, he made a guest appearance on Randy Cunningham: 9th Grade Ninja.

Chrysopylae, a symphony commissioned by the Marin Symphony Orchestra to mark the 75th anniversary of the Golden Gate Bridge, was written by composer Rob Kapilow with Newman, who was also the sound effects designer for the Golden Gate Opus. The world premiere was on May 6, 2012, at the Main Veterans' Memorial Auditorium in Marin County, California.

== Personal life ==
Newman married Katy Dobbs in 1985, and the couple has two children: Gil John Newman (son) and Lila Claire Newman (daughter). Lila appeared on A Prairie Home Companion (APHC) as an actor and singer at Ravinia in Chicago and at Town Hall in New York City. Lila began contributing sketches and writing to APHC on a weekly basis in November 2013 and received on-air credits for her work. Lila also writes radio dramas for The Truth. Both of Newman's children are pursuing acting careers. Lila starred as Charlotte 'Cee' Biggs, the daughter of John Goodman's character, on Season 2 of Alpha House on Amazon Prime Video.

== Awards ==
Fred Newman has won four awards:

- Daytime Emmy Awards, 2009
- Daytime Emmy Awards, 2008
- Daytime Emmy Awards, 2004
- CableACE Awards, 1983
