= Lila Newman =

American singer and musician

Lila Newman (born in New York City, New York) is an American actress, writer, comedian, humorist, singer and musician. She is the daughter of actor Fred Newman.

== Education ==
Lila Newman holds a B.A. from the University of Chicago, where she was a member of Off Off Campus. She also has an MFA from Drama Centre London.

== Career ==
Lila Newman is known for her work on Alpha House (2014) written by Garry Trudeau, playing opposite John Goodman and Julie White. From 2013 - 2017, Lila regularly contributed comedy writing to A Prairie Home Companion—often receiving on-air credits for work—and has appeared on the show twice as part of the Royal Academy of Radio Actors. Lila contributed comedy sketches to Live From Here on American Public Media, hosted by Chris Thile. Since Summer 2017, Lila has also been collaborating as a writer and voice actor with Radiotopia's The Truth (podcast).

She was recently awarded the Edes Prize from the Edes Foundation for the creation of a new play on the life and work of Radio Sound Effects Pioneer Ora Nichols.
