= Alpha House =

American television series

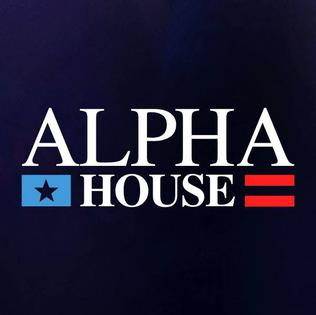
- Genre: Comedy; Political satire
- Created by: Garry Trudeau
- Starring: John Goodman; Clark Johnson; Matt Malloy; Mark Consuelos
- Theme music composer: Anton Sanko
- Composer: Anton Sanko
- Country of origin: United States
- Original language: English
- No. of seasons: 2
- No. of episodes: 21

Production
- Executive producers: Garry Trudeau; Elliot Webb; Jonathan Alter
- Producer: Antoine L. Douaihy
- Cinematography: Patrick Capone
- Running time: 26 minutes
- Production company: Amazon Studios

Original release
- Network: Amazon Prime Video
- Release: April 19, 2013 – October 24, 2014

Alpha House is an American political satire television series produced by Amazon Studios. The show stars John Goodman, Clark Johnson, Matt Malloy, and Mark Consuelos as four Republican U.S. Senators who share a house in Washington, D.C. It was created by Doonesbury creator Garry Trudeau. The show premiered on Amazon Prime Video on April 19, 2013.

The series was inspired by several real Democratic Senators who shared a row house in Washington D.C. The series has a number of cameos from celebrities such as Bill Murray (as Senator Vernon Smits) and politicians such as Chuck Schumer as himself. Amazon Studios offered the first three episodes of Alpha House for free, with each subsequent episode released weekly thereafter for Amazon Prime members on Amazon Prime Video.

On February 11, 2014, the series was renewed for a second season and the production for the second season began filming in July 2014. The entire second season became available on Amazon.com on October 24, 2014. The series was canceled after the second season.

== Cast ==
=== Starring ===
- John Goodman as Gil John Biggs, a Republican U.S. Senator from North Carolina and former basketball coach of the North Carolina Tar Heels.
- Clark Johnson as Robert Bettencourt, a Republican U.S. Senator from Pennsylvania who is currently eighth in seniority.
- Matt Malloy as Louis Laffer, a Republican U.S. Senator from Nevada who owns the house where the four Senators live.
- Mark Consuelos as Andy Guzman, a Republican U.S. Senator from Florida and candidate for President.
- Yara Martinez as Adriana de Portago, Andy's girlfriend and Cuban-American heiress who runs a super PAC that assists Republican campaigns.
- Alicia Sable as Tammy Stackhouse, a legislative assistant to Senator Biggs.
- Julie White as Maddie Biggs, Gil John's demanding wife.

=== Recurring ===
- Bill Murray as Senator Vernon Smits, the Senators' fifth roommate who is arrested in the pilot episode for multiple scandals (3 episodes, 2013–14)
- Haley Joel Osment as Shelby Mellman, a reporter from Reno, Nevada (12 episodes, 2013–14)
- Amy Sedaris as Louise Laffer, Louis's wife (14 episodes, 2013–14)
- Wanda Sykes as Senator Rosalyn DuPeche, the Senators' next-door neighbor from Illinois and the Democratic Chair of the Senate Armed Services Committee (14 episodes, 2013–14)
- Brooke Bloom as Julie Carrell, Louis's Chief of Staff (18 episodes, 2013–14)
- Kobi Libii as Aaron Stimson, Robert's legislative aide (7 episodes, 2013–14)
- Ben Rameaka as James Whippy, Louis's social media aide (17 episodes, 2013–14)
- Bjorn Dupaty as Hakeem Agabi, body man to Gil John and one of his former players (5 episodes, 2013)
- Willa Fitzgerald as Lola Laffer, Louis's daughter (12 episodes, 2013–14)
- Lila Newman as Charlotte "Cee" Biggs, Gil John's daughter (6 episodes, 2014)
- Natalie Gold as Katherine Sims, Andy's Chief of Staff (15 episodes, 2013–14)
- Sofiya Akilova as Marta Stjepanovi-Majdandzic, the Senators' Croatian housekeeper and Andy's mistress (7 episodes, 2013–14)
- Tony Plana as Benito "Benny" López, Adriana's aide (6 episodes, 2013–14)
- Richard Cox as Graydon Talbot, a spin doctor counseling Andy (9 episodes, 2013–14)
- Owen Campbell as Dilly DeSantis, loosely based on the young data scientists that worked on the Barack Obama presidential campaign in 2012 (3 episodes, 2013–14)
- Molly Kate Bernard as Angie Sullivan, a videographer working for the Republican Party Chair (4 episodes, 2013–14)
- Lee Tergesen as Col. Eugene Drake, a gay army commander who intrigues Louis (3 episodes, 2014)
- William Thomas Evans as Senator Lamar Farkus, a Republican from Delaware (9 episodes, 2013–14)
- Cynthia Nixon as Senator Carly Armiston, a New York Democrat and the chair of the Senate Ethics Committee (6 episodes, 2013)
- Kenneth Tigar as Senator Paul Mower, an Idaho Republican (5 episodes, 2013–14)
- Marylouise Burke as Senator Betty Mower, Paul's widow, who takes his position following his death. (4 episodes, 2013–14)
- Janel Moloney as Senator Peg Stanchion, a North Dakota Libertarian activist and member of the Tea Party (4 episodes, 2014)
- Bianca Amato as Senator Alice Graves, a Republican from Maine (2 episodes, 2014)
- Bob Balaban as Senator Elliot Robeson, a Democrat from California (2 episodes, 2014)
- Lucy DeVito as Charity Robeson, Elliot's daughter (4 episodes, 2014)
- Anita Petry as Camila Perez, a Spanish Professor visiting from Barcelona (3 episodes, 2013)
- Chance Kelly as Bo Carthage, the CEO of a private military contractor (2 episodes, 2013)
- Matty Blake as Captain Brandon Carshaw, Ret. (2 episodes, 2013)
- Wendy Makkena as Molly P. Andresun (2 episodes, 2014)
- Tracy Howe as Colonel Wozniak (2 episodes, 2013)
- Ted King as Al Hickok, a Tea Party activist running for Senator Laffer's seat during the primaries (2 episodes, 2013)
- Penn Jillette as a fictionalized version of himself, running as the Democratic candidate for Louis's Senate seat (5 episodes, 2014)
- Ed Rendell as a fictionalized version of himself, running as the Democratic candidate for Robert's Senate seat (2 episodes, 2014)
- Matthew Humphreys as Colonel Leland Grimmel, a war hero and former basketball player running as the Democratic candidate for Gil John's Seat (4 episodes, 2014)
- Todd Susman and Lee Wilkof as the Watt Brothers, wealthy casino owners and businessmen from Nevada funding Louis and Gil John (4 episodes, 2013–14)
- Tamara Tunie as Eve Bettencourt, Robert's divorced wife (2 episodes, 2014)

=== Cameos ===
- Stephen Colbert
- Chris Matthews
- Joe Scarborough
- Mika Brzezinski
- Michael Steele
- Chuck Schumer
- Dick Morris
- Anthony Weiner
- Grover Norquist
- Tom Brokaw
- Chris Jansing
- Matt Lauer
- Jane Pauley
- Kelly Ripa
- Michael Strahan
- Rachel Maddow
- Jon Ralston
- Elizabeth Warren
- John McCain
- David Axelrod
- Bradley Whitford
- Jake Tapper
- Andy Cohen

== Episodes ==
Season	Episodes	Originally released	
Season	Episodes	First released	Last released
1	11	September 8, 2013	January 10, 2014
2	10	October 24, 2014	

=== Season 1 (2013–14) ===
No. overall	No. in season	Title	Directed by	Written by	Original release date
1	1	"Pilot"	Adam Bernstein	Garry Trudeau	April 19, 2013
Re-election battles, looming indictments, parties, their Party... these senators need a drink. And a new housemate.
2	2	"No Shame"	Adam Bernstein	Garry Trudeau	November 15, 2013
The senators adjust to their new roommate, and his girlfriend, as preparations for the Congressional Delegation to Afghanistan continue. Meanwhile, Louis' appearance on The Colbert Report takes a wrong turn, leaving him to search for an alternate way to win over voters.
3	3	"All Weapons Red"	Adam Bernstein	Garry Trudeau	November 15, 2013
As the re-election battles heat up the four senators travel to Afghanistan as part of a Congressional Delegation and encounter a surprise.
4	4	"Triggers"	Jake Schreier	Garry Trudeau	November 22, 2013
After a surprise explosion in Afghanistan leaves Louis recovering from an injury, Adriana makes controversial private arrangements for the group to return home.
5	5	"Hippo Issues"	Michael Mayer	Garry Trudeau	November 29, 2013
Tempers heat up as Gil John's wife Maddie (Julie White) arrives to help him prepare for his upcoming debate with Digger Mancusi. Meanwhile, Louis continues to recover in the hospital and Senator Armiston (Cynthia Nixon) leads an ethics committee investigation against Robert.
6	6	"Zingers"	Bob Balaban	Garry Trudeau	December 6, 2013
Louis continues to gain constituent support as Shelby (Haley Joel Osment) chronicles his recovery. Gil John faces Digger Mancusi in a town hall where he struggles to keep up with his polished and well-liked opponent, despite much help and coaching from Robert and Andy.
7	7	"Prayer Brunch"	Bob Balaban	Garry Trudeau	December 13, 2013
Rosalyn (Wanda Sykes) organizes a prayer brunch to celebrate Louis' homecoming from the hospital, but the Senators and their fellow Democrats find it difficult to set aside their differences. Aaron and Tammy's relationship continues to grow and Lola has a surprise in store for James.
8	8	"Ruby Shoals"	Michael Mayer	Peter Gwinn & Alison McDonald and Garry Trudeau	December 20, 2013
While on the campaign trail through North Carolina, Gil John blows off a meeting with the governor to visit Ruby Shoals where he becomes re-inspired about his campaign. Robert's pro-fracking visit to a constituent's home in Pennsylvania does not go as planned.
9	9	"The Rebuttal"	Jann Turner	Will Graham & Jared Gruszecki and Garry Trudeau	December 27, 2013
Robert proves to the ethics committee that he would never take a mohair suit while Andy prepares to deliver a rebuttal after the State of the Union. Louis is put in the spotlight on his first day back when James mistakenly tweets a photo intended for Lola from the wrong account.
10	10	"Showgirls"	Andrew McCarthy	Garry Trudeau	January 3, 2014
Louis decides to help showgirls organize, but the Watt brothers stand in his way. A video of Gil John hitting a soldier with a chair in Afghanistan goes viral so Maddie looks for a way to humanize him and Andy's Vanity Fair cover shoot takes an unexpected direction.
11	11	"In the Saddle"	Clark Johnson	Garry Trudeau	January 10, 2014
When another senator dies unexpectedly, Gil John is asked to organize the funeral arrangements. Louis wins the Nevada primary, but Robert has to face off in a Pennsylvania debate to cool the competition.

=== Season 2 (2014) ===
On February 11, 2014, the series was renewed for a second season. Production for the second season began filming in July 2014, and the entire season premiered on Amazon.com on October 24, 2014.

No. overall	No. in season	Title	Directed by	Written by	Original release date
12	1	"The Love Doctor"	Michael Mayer	Garry Trudeau	October 24, 2014
Gil John helps a former player become a war hero, and quickly regrets it. Robert hosts an engagement party for his latest matchmaking success, but isn't prepared for the surprise guest.
13	2	"Gaffergate"	Andrew McCarthy	Garry Trudeau	October 24, 2014
Gil John pays a visit to the Watt brothers, Louis worries when an old college friend threatens to share stories, and Andy tries to talk his way out of "Gaffergate," only to learn he's got bigger image problems.
14	3	"The Contest"	Michael Mayer	Garry Trudeau	October 24, 2014
Andy and Adriana start planning for a future worthy of a first family. Louis preps for the "Funniest Celebrity in Washington" contest, while his opponent, Penn Jillette, preps for their senate race. Back at the house, the Watt brothers find a new way to taunt Gil John.
15	4	"Shelter In Place"	Andrew McCarthy	Will Graham and Garry Trudeau	October 24, 2014
Cee Biggs brings her reality show cameras to her father's office - just in time for gunshots that trigger a lockdown on Capitol Hill. Rosalyn (Wanda Sykes) forces Robert to face the truth about his marriage, and Louis is forced to let go of a fantasy.
16	5	"The Apparition"	Michael Mayer	Garry Trudeau	October 24, 2014
Gil John tries to right things after the Watts brothers "Swift Boat" his former player. Julie shocks Louis and Louise (Amy Sedaris) by announcing she's pregnant from an anonymous donor, while Adriana confronts Marta the housekeeper about Andy. Louis tries to debate Penn Jillette, but he's no match for what the magician has up his sleeves.
17	6	"The Retreat"	Andrew McCarthy	Garry Trudeau	October 24, 2014
The senators head to a Republican retreat at a Virginia plantation, where they're haunted by the ghosts of slavery, Ronald Reagan and their exes. After a soul-cleansing bonfire with the housemates, Gil John awakes with a new fire in his belly.
18	7	"The Civility Zone"	Jann Turner	Garry Trudeau	October 24, 2014
Gil John finally breaks through to daughter Cee, then gets a lesson in civility from the women's caucus. Andy heads to Miami to try and win back Adriana, and gets some insights into his "condition" from a therapist. Meanwhile, Robert ignores his advisors and helps register black voters.
19	8	"Bugged"	Bob Balaban	Will Graham and Garry Trudeau	October 24, 2014
After a break-in at the Alpha House, the NSA does a sweep, and gets suspicious – which lands Robert a new covert mission. Meanwhile, Gil John goes to bat for the women's caucus bill, earning him a whole new following. And Louis's aides inspire him to publicly "evolve" on gay marriage, much to their chagrin.
20	9	"There Will Be Water"	Antoine Douaihy	Garry Trudeau	October 24, 2014
Gil John gets attacked by Sarah Palin and embraced by the media. Pressured by the party chair, Louis nudges Julie to consider a big wedding. Robert is forced to kiss up to his ex-wife's new beau, but gets some help from Rosalyn (Wanda Sykes).
21	10	"The Nuptials"	Adam Bernstein	Will Graham and Garry Trudeau	October 24, 2014
As the election returns come in, Gil John meets with a presidential campaign advisor, while Robert wonders if he still has a job. Katherine and Julie discover their wedding has been turned into a major political event – after they arrive.

== Production ==
Filming took place on stages at Kaufman Astoria Studios in Queens. ADR recording was done at Cherry Beach Sound in Toronto.

== Broadcast ==
In Australia, where Prime Video was not yet available, the series premiered on SoHo on July 14, 2014, and returned for season two on February 26, 2015.

== Reception ==
Reaction to Alpha House has been generally positive. Metacritic gives season 1 an average rating of 68/100 based on reviews from 21 critics. Rotten Tomatoes gives season 1 a score of 76% based on reviews from 38 critics. Rotten Tomatoes gives season 2 a score of 83% based on reviews from 6 critics.

== Awards and nominations ==
Year	Award	Category	Recipients	Result
2014	Satellite Awards	Best Television Series, Comedy or Musical	Amazon Studios	Nominated
2014	Satellite Awards	Best Actor in a Series, Comedy or Musical	John Goodman	Won
2015	Imagen Awards	Best Actor - Television	Mark Consuelos	Nominated
2015	Satellite Awards	Best Television Series, Comedy or Musical	Amazon Studios	Nominated
2015	Satellite Awards	Best Actor in a Series, Comedy or Musical	John Goodman	Nominated
