= The Rundown with Robin Thede =

- Genre: Talk show; News satire
- Created by: Robin Thede
- Directed by: André Allen
- Presented by: Robin Thede
- Composers: The Roots; Ray Angry
- Country of origin: United States
- Original language: English
- No. of seasons: 1
- No. of episodes: 24

Production
- Executive producers: Robin Thede; Chris Rock; Tony Hernandez; Lilly Burns
- Producers: John Skidmore; Genevieve Aniello
- Production locations: CBS Broadcast Center, New York City, New York
- Running time: 20 minutes
- Production companies: For Better or Words Inc.; CR Enterprises Inc.; Jax Media

Original release
- Network: BET
- Release: October 12, 2017 – April 19, 2018

The Rundown with Robin Thede is an American late-night talk show and variety television program that aired on BET from October 12, 2017, to April 19, 2018. The show was hosted by comedian and writer Robin Thede, the former head writer and correspondent on The Nightly Show with Larry Wilmore. On July 25, 2018, it was announced that BET had canceled the series.

== Premise ==
The Rundown with Robin Thede sees comedian Robin Thede's "take on the week's headlines in politics and pop culture with a fast-paced, no-holds-barred show that [features] social commentary, sketch comedy and pop culture parodies."

== Production ==
=== Background ===
Thede was a head writer and performer on The Nightly Show with Larry Wilmore. From 2015–16, she was the head writer for the first season and a half of The Nightly Show, the first African-American woman to hold that position on any late-night talk show.

=== Development ===
Two weeks after The Nightly Show was canceled in August 2016, Thede partnered with production company Jax Media to produce an independently financed pilot for a weekly show that would integrate her comedic takes on headlines with sketches, musical performances, and documentary-style segments. Soon thereafter, Chris Rock became involved in the production, the pilot was produced, and it was quickly sold to BET.

On April 26, 2017, it was announced that BET had given the production a series order for a first season consisting of 24 episodes. Executive producers were reported to include Robin Thede, Chris Rock, and Tony Hernandez. On July 25, 2018, it was announced that BET had declined to renew the series for a second season, effectively canceling it.

=== Podcast ===
The show had a podcast aftershow, entitled The Ran-down, that was released every Thursday after an episode airs on television. Each episode of the podcast featured a surprise celebrity guest, something the television show didn't feature often due to time constraints.

== Episodes ==
| No. | Original release date | Guest(s) | Musical/entertainment guest(s) |
|---|---|---|---|
| 1 | October 12, 2017 | N/A | Duckwrth |
In a cold open sketch, Robin attempts to pick-up a black Trump supporter. The night's rundown topics Eminem's freestyle rap The Storm, Chris Foerster's resignation from the Miami Dolphins following the release of a video of him snorting cocaine, the failed arrest of Yaroub Assad, the firing of a newly-hired firefighter after he brought a watermelon with him to his first day at work at a primarily black fire station, and Jemele Hill's suspension at ESPN. Robin also takes a look at CTE's effect on football players.
| 2 | October 19, 2017 | N/A | Jhene Aiko |
| 3 | October 26, 2017 | N/A | N/A |
| 4 | November 2, 2017 | N/A | N/A |
| 5 | November 9, 2017 | N/A | N/A |
| 6 | November 16, 2017 | N/A | N/A |
| 7 | November 30, 2017 | N/A | Rapsody |
| 8 | December 7, 2017 | N/A | N/A |
| 9 | December 14, 2017 | N/A | N/A |
| 10 | December 21, 2017 | N/A | Lecrae |
| 11 | January 11, 2018 | N/A | N/A |
| 12 | January 18, 2018 | N/A | N/A |
| 13 | January 25, 2018 | N/A | N/A |
| 14 | February 1, 2018 | N/A | St. Beauty |
| 15 | February 8, 2018 | N/A | N/A |
| 16 | February 15, 2018 | N/A | N/A |
| 17 | March 1, 2018 | N/A | Ravyn Lenae |
| 18 | March 8, 2018 | N/A | N/A |
| 19 | March 15, 2018 | N/A | N/A |
| 20 | March 22, 2018 | N/A | Leikeli47 |
| 21 | March 29, 2018 | Jussie Smollett | N/A |
| 22 | April 5, 2018 | N/A | Lion Babe |
The night's rundown topics include Michael Rapaport's comments to Kenya Moore on Watch What Happens Live with Andy Cohen, protests by teachers in regards to education funding across the United States, Donald Trump's attack on Amazon in relation to the United States Postal Service, and an Arizona mother's tazing of her son when he refused to go to church. Robin also takes a look at Black home ownership and Trump's decision to place the National Guard on the US-Mexican border.
| 23 | April 12, 2018 | Mablean Ephriam | N/A |
The night's rundown topics include Mark Zuckerberg's testimony in front of Congress, Paul Ryan's announcement of his retirement, and Nicolle Rochelle's protest outside of Bill Cosby's trial. Robin also takes a look at the federal judge nominations Donald Trump has made and submits judge Mablean Ephriam to a mock confirmation hearing. She also takes an in-depth look at the undertreatment of pain for black patients by doctors.
| 24 | April 19, 2018 | Erika Alexander | Lecrae, Rapsody, and Leikeli47 |
The night's rundown topics include the arrest of two black men at a Starbucks in Philadelphia and Kendrick Lamar's receipt of the Pulitzer Prize for Music. Robin also takes a look at the Black women running for elected office in the United States in 2018.

== Reception ==
The Rundown with Robin Thede met with a positive response from critics. On the review aggregation website Rotten Tomatoes, its sole season holds a 100% approval rating with an average rating of 9 out of 10 based on 5 reviews. Metacritic, which uses a weighted average, assigned the season a score of 78 out of 100 based on 4 critics, indicating "generally favorable reviews".
