= Robin Thede =

American comedian and writer (born 1979)

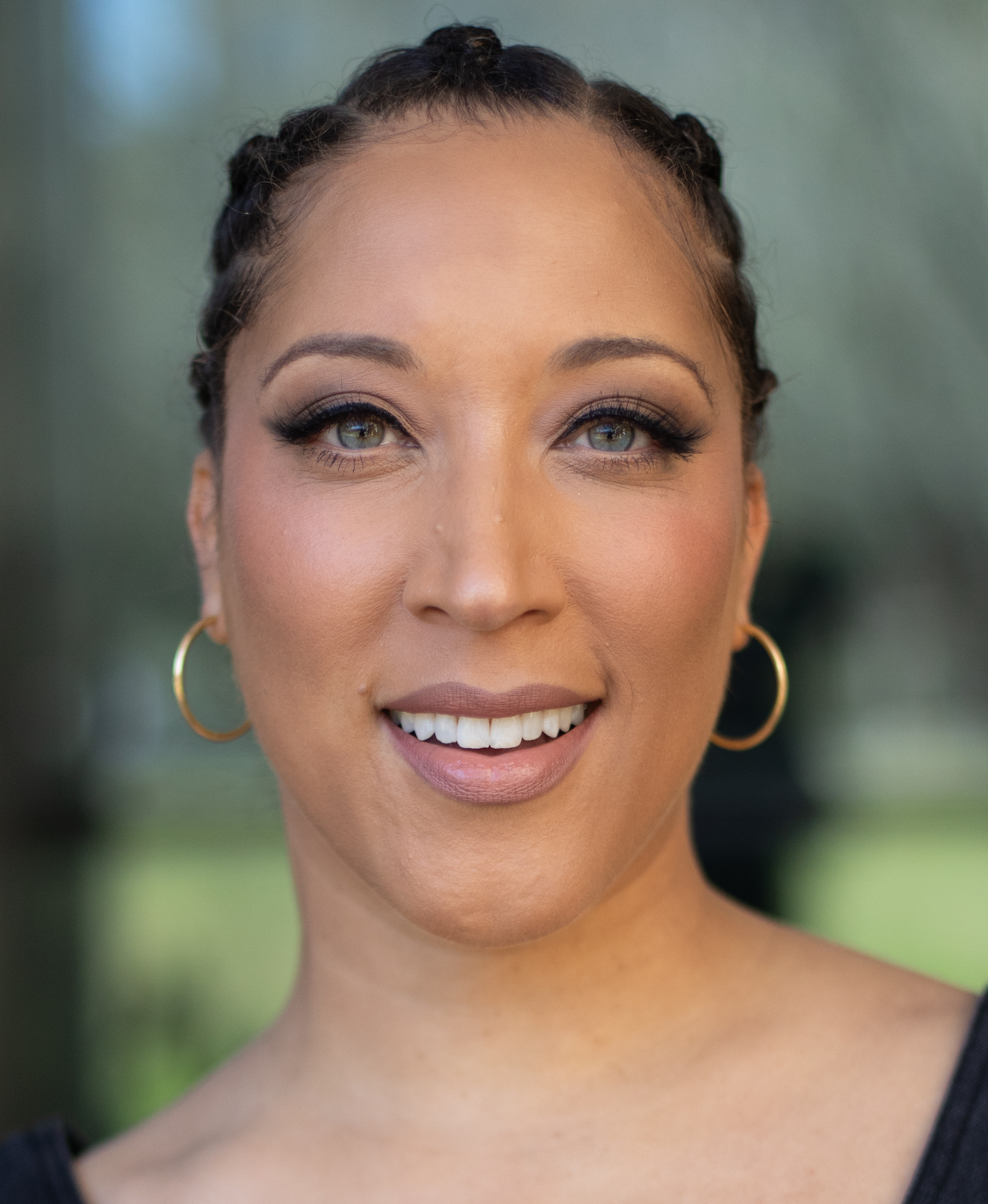
- Thede in 2023
- Born: July 27, 1979 (age 47); Spencer, Iowa, U.S.
- Education: Northwestern University (BA)
- Occupations: Comedian; actress; writer
- Years active: 2006–present
- Parents: Dave Thede (father); Phyllis Thede (mother)

Robin Thede (/ˈθiːdi/ THEE-dee; born July 27, 1979), is an American comedian, actress and writer. Raised in Iowa, she has also worked as an entertainment correspondent, host, and radio personality. In 2015, she became the first African-American woman to be head writer for a late-night talk show (The Nightly Show with Larry Wilmore). From 2017 to 2018, Thede hosted The Rundown with Robin Thede on BET. She created and co-starred in the Emmy-nominated HBO series A Black Lady Sketch Show.

== Early life and education ==
Robin Thede was born in Spencer, Iowa. Her parents are Phyllis Thede, who is African American, and Dave Thede, who is German American. Robin Thede was named after stand-up comedian and actor Robin Williams. She stated on Late Night with Seth Meyers this was most likely due to her father's love of Williams' work. She grew up in Davenport, Iowa, where her father was an educator and her mother also worked in community schools and served with the union for school staff. Thede's two sisters were born there. Thede and her sisters attended local schools in Davenport, with Robin attending Davenport North High School. Later her parents moved to Bettendorf, Iowa.

Her mother was elected in 2009 as Iowa State Representative for House District 93 and served until 2021.

Thede graduated from Northwestern University in Evanston, Illinois, earning a degree in Broadcast Journalism and African-American Studies. After college, Thede studied at The Second City theatre group in Chicago.

== Career ==
Robin first started with a sketch comedy group called Cleos Apartment with writers Diallo Riddle and Bashir Salahuddin. Members included Thomas Fraser, Wyatt Cenac, Nika Williams and Nefetari Spencer. That stage show was picked up online by AOL and HBO for a new show called The Message which ran for a full year, 2007.

Thede was also head writer and a performer on The Nightly Show with Larry Wilmore. From 2015 to 2016, she was the head writer for the first season and a half of The Nightly Show, the first biracial woman to hold that position on any late-night talk show. Thede is also the second biracial woman to write for a late-night talk show, as Amber Ruffin was first to join the writing staff for Late Night with Seth Meyers.

Prior to that, she was head writer on The Queen Latifah Show and staff writer on the first two seasons of Real Husbands of Hollywood on BET. In January 2013, she appeared in the Marlon Wayans' comedy A Haunted House opposite comedian JB Smoove. She also had recurring appearances as "Gail" on Second Generation Wayans on BET in March 2013.

Thede has often worked on TV shows as both a writer and actress, including on the short-lived Fox series In the Flow with Affion Crockett, the Mike Epps sketch comedy series Funny Bidness, and on the comedy series Clunkers (starring Carl Payne, David Faustino and Sherman Hemsley).

Thede's recent television appearances include roles on Key & Peele (Comedy Central), Hot In Cleveland (TV Land), Chocolate News (Comedy Central), Kath & Kim (NBC), Worst Week (CBS) and All of Us (UPN). She was a series regular on the BET original web series Buppies with Tatyana Ali.

Thede's other writing credits include BET Awards (2014), BET Honors (2013), UNCF: An Evening of Stars (2013), BET Awards (2007, 2008, 2009, 2010, 2011, 2012), NAACP Image Awards (2011), the BET Hip Hop Awards (2010, 2011, 2012) and more.

Additionally, Thede has created several successful videos, including "Shit Black Guys Say" (which went viral with 2.5 million views on YouTube), "Every Little Step" with Wayne Brady, Bobby Brown and Mike Tyson (Funny or Die.com), and "For Stuffed Colored Girls" (Funny or Die.com). She can also be seen with Elite Delta Force 3 in "The Real Housewives of Civil Rights" (Funny or Die.com/EDF3 YouTube Channel).

Thede's comedy work extends from years of professional live sketch comedy (Second City Chicago and LA, Improv Olympic, Acme) to comedic commentary on shows such as 10 Things I Hate About Me for the Style Network. She is also a performer and writer for the all-female sketch group "Elite Delta Force 3", which won the 2009 Audience Award Winner of the Los Angeles Comedy Improv Festival.

Other notable work includes co-hosting on The Voice of Reason on Jamie Foxx's Foxxhole Sirius/XM radio channel. She worked as a regular entertainment correspondent for E! News with Ryan Seacrest and Giuliana Rancic.

In October 2017, Thede began hosting her own late-night TV talk show, The Rundown with Robin Thede on BET. She is one of a few African-American women to host their own late-night show.

In June 2019, Thede was named one of Variety's 10 Comics to Watch for 2019. Most recently Thede created, writes, and performs in A Black Lady Sketch Show, which premiered on HBO on August 2, 2019. In April 2021, the second season of A Black Lady Sketch Show premiered.

In 2020, she signed a development deal with Warner Bros. Television.

== Filmography ==
=== As writer ===
Year	Title	Credited as	Notes
2015–2016	The Nightly Show with Larry Wilmore	Head writer	162 episodes
2016	White House Correspondents' Dinner	Head writer	
2017–2018	The Rundown with Robin Thede	Creator, executive producer, writer	Host, 17 episodes
2019–2023	A Black Lady Sketch Show	Creator, executive producer, writer	Various acting roles

=== As actress ===
Year	Title	Role	Notes
2004	Plant One on Me	Roses Moses	
2004	All of Us	Robin	2 episodes
2005	Office Court	Kenitra	Short
2005	County General	Simone	
2006	Guy Walks Into a Bar	Various	
2006	Kwameworld	Lisa	
2007	S.O.B.: Socially Offensive Behavior	Various	3 episodes
2007	Frank TV	News reporter	
2008	Chocolate News	Victoria Billows	1 episode
2008	Kath & Kim	Karen	1 episode
2008	Worst Week	News anchor	1 episode
2009–2010	Buppies	Priscilla	10 episodes
2010	All Access	Vanessa	Short
2010	For (Stuffed) Colored Girls		Short
2010	Every Little Step		Short
2010	Hot in Cleveland	Janet	1 episode
2011	In the Flow with Affion Crockett	Various	6 episodes
2011	Sometimes Pretty Girls	Marilyn	Short
2011	Clunkers	Cheryl	8 episodes
2012	Key & Peele	Girlfriend	1 episode
2012	Second Generation Wayans	Gail	3 episodes
2012	Finding My Obama	Robin	
2013	The Goodwin Games	Marta	1 episode
2013	Second Generation Wayans	Gail	3 episodes
2013	A Haunted House	Kisha's mother	
2017	Urban Press	Tina	Short
2017	Difficult People	Melissa	1 episode
2020	Bad Hair	Denise	1 episode
2020	Central Park	Anita	1 episode – voice role
2020	Insecure	Nicki	1 episode
2021	The Great North	Diondra Tundra	2 episodes – voice role
2023	Candy Cane Lane	Cordelia	Voice
2024	Moon Girl and Devil Dinosaur	Quickwhip	Voice, episode: "Ride and Die"
2026	Relationship Goals	Brenda Phelps	Direct to video
2026	I Love Boosters	Light-Skinned Mariah	

=== Other appearances ===
Year	Title	Role	Notes
2020	Haute Dog	Herself, judge	7 episodes
2023	The Daily Show	Herself (Guest)	Episode: April 4
2023	RuPaul's Drag Race All Stars	Herself, judge	1 episode
2025	Celebrity Jeopardy! (American game show)	Herself (Contestant)	Episode 6, 11

== Awards and nominations ==
=== Emmy Awards ===
The Emmy Awards are presented by the Academy of Television Arts & Sciences.

Year	Nominated work	Award	Result
2020	A Black Lady Sketch Show	Outstanding Variety Sketch Series	Nominated
2021	A Black Lady Sketch Show	Outstanding Variety Sketch Series	Nominated
2021	A Black Lady Sketch Show	Outstanding Writing in a Variety Sketch Series	Nominated
2022	A Black Lady Sketch Show	Outstanding Variety Sketch Series	Nominated
2023	A Black Lady Sketch Show	Outstanding Variety Sketch Series	Nominated

=== Mipcom Awards ===
Mipcom's Diversify TV Excellence Awards are presented annually in order to recognize, champion and celebrate diversity, equality and inclusion in television programming across the international television industry. Thede has been honored with 1 award.

Year	Nominated work	Award	Result
2020	Herself	Variety Creative Change Award	Honored

=== TCA Awards ===
The TCA Awards are awards presented by the Television Critics Association in recognition of excellence in television. Thede has won 1 award.

Year	Nominated work	Award	Result
2020	A Black Lady Sketch Show	Outstanding Achievement in Sketch/Variety Shows	Won
