= Kevin Fredericks =

American comedian, actor, and content creator

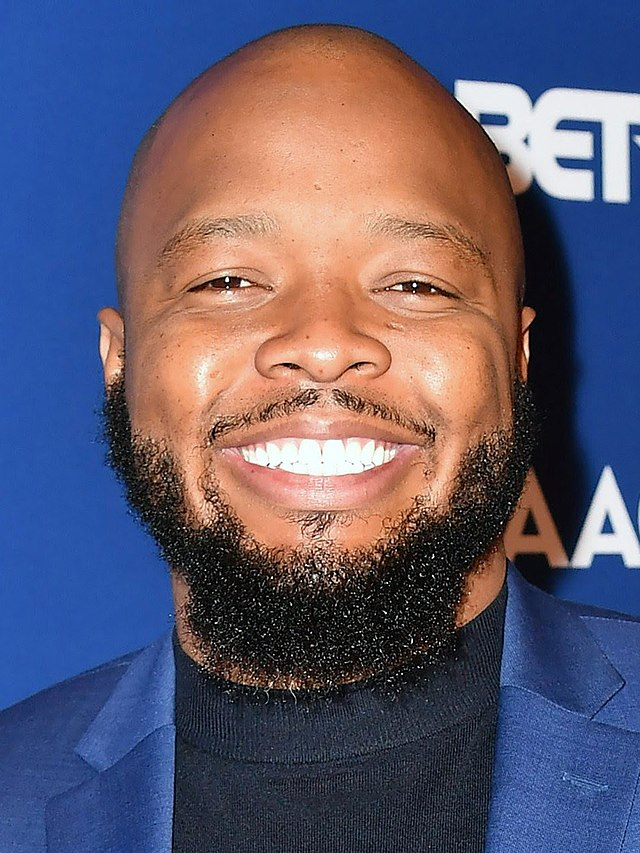
- Born: May 1, 1983 (age 43); United States
- Other name: KevOnStage
- Occupations: Comedian; actor; writer; content creator
- Known for: Digital comedy, stand-up, Churchy
- Spouse: Melissa Fredericks

Kevin Fredericks (born May 1, 1983), known professionally as KevOnStage, is an American comedian, actor, writer, and digital content creator. He is known for his observational comedy centered on family life, faith, and contemporary culture, as well as for building a large audience through platforms such as YouTube and Instagram.

== Early life and education ==
Fredericks was raised in a Christian household, an influence that later shaped much of his comedic voice and subject matter. Before pursuing entertainment full time, he worked various jobs while developing his comedic style. Fredericks has publicly stated that his family is of Haitian origin.

== Career ==
=== Digital media ===
Fredericks began his career creating comedic sketches and commentary videos on platforms such as YouTube and Instagram. His content often focuses on relationships, parenting, and church culture, helping him build a large online following. Outside of his own social media profiles and shows, he was a recurring cast member on YouTube comedy platforms such as All Def Digital.

=== Stand-up comedy ===
As his online audience grew, Fredericks transitioned into stand-up comedy, headlining national tours including the Person of Interest tour. In 2025, he had a multi-city national tour, Life from the Back Pew. Fredericks tours with comedian Tony Baker hosting the Bald Brothers: A Freestyle Comedy Show. Fredericks began his "Grief Sucks" A One Man Show tour in August 2026. The national tour will expand internationally in 2027. During the Covid-19 pandemic and subsequent quarantine period, Fredericks created and hosted the Keep Your Distance stand up comedy series, which showcased rotating cast of familiar and up-and-coming comics in a socially distanced venue.

=== Television and film ===
In 2021, Fredericks created the food reality series What's Good, showcasing black-owned restaurants in the United States. The series aired on Fredericks' streaming service KevOnStage Studios. He later co-hosted the TBS talk series Friday Night Vibes alongside Nina Parker.

In 2024, Fredericks co-created and starred in the BET+ comedy series Churchy, which explores church life and community through humor. The second season of the series premiered in August 2025. He created and starred in the improv comedy sketch show The Hospital, which premiered in September 2025 on BET. He serves as an executive producer for the scripted series FreeLance, which premiered at the 2026 Sundance Film Festival.

=== Podcasting ===
Fredericks co-hosts The Bald Brothers Podcast with comedian Tony Baker. Fredericks co-hosts the podcast Here's the Thing with comedian That Chick Angel. The podcast features discussions on relationships, entertainment, and culture, often incorporating humor and personal anecdotes. Since 2025, he has been hosting the iHeartPodcasts and Unanimous Media podcast Not My Best Moment, where he interviews guests about mistakes they've made in their careers.

== Awards and recognition ==
Fredericks was nominated for "Outstanding Social Media Personality of the Year” at the 2023 NAACP Image Awards.
