= Churchy =

- Genre: Comedy-drama
- Created by: Kevin Fredericks
- Starring: Kevin Fredericks; Anthony Elfonzia; Lexi Allen; London Solomon; Mark J. P. Hood; Shani Shockley
- Country of origin: United States
- Original language: English
- No. of seasons: 2
- No. of episodes: 18

Production
- Executive producers: Kevin Fredericks; Melissa Fredericks; Jason Fredericks; LeBron James; Maverick Carter; Jamal Henderson; Lezlie Wills
- Producers: Brely Evans; Richard A. Washington
- Camera setup: Single-camera
- Production companies: KOS Studios; The SpringHill Company

Original release
- Network: BET+
- Release: February 15, 2024 – August 21, 2025

Churchy is an American comedy drama television series created by comedian Kevin "KevOnStage" Fredericks and executive produced by Fredericks and The SpringHill Company. The series stars Fredericks as Corey Carr Jr., a son of megachurch leader, who travels to Lubbock, Texas, with lofty ambitions to build his own ministry from the ground up.

The series premiered on February 15, 2024, on BET+. Churchy's second season was released on August 21, 2025.

== Cast and characters ==
- Kevin Fredericks as Corey Carr Jr.
- Anthony Elfonzia as Pastor Stinney
- Lexi Allen as Mother Jean
- London Solomon as Jojo
- Mark J. P. Hood as Rodney Joseph
- Shani Shockley as Kiesha Charles
- Angel Laketa Moore as Laurie Lee
- Tony Winters as Pastor Theodore
- Dinora Walcott as Rachel Kaplan
- Jonathan Slocumb as Bishop Carr
- Quin Walters as Sharon

== Episodes ==
Season	Episodes	Originally released
1	8	February 15, 2024
2	10	August 21, 2025

=== Season 1 (2024) ===
No. overall	No. in season	Title	Directed by	Written by	Original release date
1	1	"The Passover"	Irin "Iroc" Daniels	Sydney Castillo & Kevin Fredericks & Richard A. Washington	February 15, 2024
2	2	"Lubbock or Leave It"	Irin "Iroc" Daniels	Sydney Castillo & Kevin Fredericks	February 15, 2024
3	3	"The Mourning After"	Irin "Iroc" Daniels	Sydney Castillo & Kevin Fredericks	February 15, 2024
4	4	"Tobe or Not Tobe"	Irin "Iroc" Daniels	Sydney Castillo & Kevin Fredericks & Richard A. Washington	February 15, 2024
5	5	"The Praise Team"	Irin "Iroc" Daniels	Sydney Castillo & Kevin Fredericks	February 15, 2024
6	6	"The New Preacher"	Irin "Iroc" Daniels	Sydney Castillo & Kevin Fredericks	February 15, 2024
7	7	"The Fall"	Irin "Iroc" Daniels	Sydney Castillo & Kevin Fredericks	February 15, 2024
8	8	"Easter"	Irin "Iroc" Daniels	Sydney Castillo & Kevin Fredericks	February 15, 2024

=== Season 2 (2025) ===
No. overall	No. in season	Title	Directed by	Written by	Original release date
9	1	"Shine Bright"	Jared Leaf	Richard A. Washington	August 21, 2025
10	2	"Roped Into Love"	Jared Leaf	Richard A. Washington	August 21, 2025
11	3	"Vacation Bible School"	Jared Leaf	Richard A. Washington	August 21, 2025
12	4	"Lubbock Lotto"	Jared Leaf	Richard A. Washington	August 21, 2025
13	5	"Fight the Power"	Jared Leaf	Richard A. Washington	August 21, 2025
14	6	"Keith Lee"	Jared Leaf	Richard A. Washington	August 21, 2025
15	7	"Locked Up"	Jared Leaf	Richard A. Washington	August 21, 2025
16	8	"Bible Bowl"	Jared Leaf	Richard A. Washington	August 21, 2025
17	9	"Love Birds"	Jared Leaf	Richard A. Washington	August 21, 2025
18	10	"Dress for Success"	Jared Leaf	Richard A. Washington	August 21, 2025
