= Dicktown, New York =

Ghost town

Coordinates: 41.476°N 73.775°W

Dicktown is a ghost town in Putnam County, in the U.S. state of New York. It was located on a side street off of New York State Route 301 on the east side of Sagamore Lake east of Clarence Fahnestock State Park

Dicktown was named for the fact that a large share of the early settlers were named Richard. It is now Richardsville Road, Putnam County NY. It is dissected between Town of Kent NY and Town of Putnam Valley NY
