= Holyfield's Real Deal Records =

American recording company

Real Deal Records, LLC was an American recording company founded February 11, 1999 by boxer Evander Holyfield and business partner Rochester Johnson Jr. Musicians signed to Real Deal Records include recording artist/producer LeJitt, rapper/producer Cuttboy G Dinero, rapper/actress 2Meka Diaz, R&B quartet Shalom, Saison, a popular Filipino singer, NuWine, a rapper from Houston, Exhale, a trio of unique R&B singers, and gospel singer Lexi. Holyfield emphasized the immense diversity in the music that came out of his label.
