= Primetime Emmy Award for Outstanding Scripted Variety Series =

Annual television award

- Awarded for: Outstanding Scripted Variety Series
- Country: United States
- Presented by: Academy of Television Arts & Sciences
- First award: 2015
- Final award: 2025
- Website: emmys.com

The Primetime Emmy Award for Outstanding Scripted Variety Series was an award presented to the best sketch comedy-driven variety show of the year. The award went to the producers of the series.

== History ==
In 2015, Outstanding Variety Series was separated into two categories, Outstanding Variety Talk Series and Outstanding Variety Sketch Series.

In 2023, the category was renamed Outstanding Scripted Variety Series.

In 2026, the split was reversed and the categories were remerged with Outstanding Variety Series returning at the 78th Primetime Emmy Awards.

== Winners and nominations ==
=== 2010s ===
Year	Program	Producers	Network
Outstanding Variety Sketch Series
2015 (67th)
2015 (67th)	Inside Amy Schumer (Season 2–3)	Amy Schumer, Jessi Klein, Daniel Powell, Steven Ast and Tony Hernandez, executive producers; Kim Caramele and Kevin Kane, producers	Comedy Central
2015 (67th)	Drunk History (Season 2)	Adam McKay, Will Ferrell, Owen Burke, Derek Waters and Jeremy Konner, executive producers; Melissa Wylie, produced by	Comedy Central
2015 (67th)	Key & Peele (Season 4)	Jordan Peele, Keegan-Michael Key, Ian Roberts, Jay Martel, Joel Zadak, Peter Principato and Paul Young, executive producers; Peter Atencio, co-executive producer; Linda Morel, produced by; Keith Raskin, consulting producer	Comedy Central
2015 (67th)	Portlandia (Season 5)	Lorne Michaels, Fred Armisen, Carrie Brownstein, Jonathan Krisel and Andrew Singer, executive producers; Karey Dornetto and Graham Wagner, co-executive producers; David Cress and Alice Mathias, producers	IFC
2015 (67th)	Saturday Night Live (Season 40)	Lorne Michaels, executive producer; Ken Aymong, supervising producer; Lindsay Shookus and Erin Doyle, producers; Steve Higgins and Erik Kenward, produced by	NBC
2016 (68th)
2016 (68th)	Key & Peele (Season 5)	Keegan-Michael Key, Jordan Peele, Jay Martel, Ian Roberts, Peter Principato, Paul Young and Joel Zadak, executive producers; Peter Atencio, co-executive producer; Linda Morel, produced by	Comedy Central
2016 (68th)	Documentary Now! (Season 1)	Lorne Michaels, Fred Armisen, Bill Hader, Seth Meyers, Rhys Thomas and Andrew Singer, executive producers; Erik Kenward, supervising producer; Hilary Marx and Alice Mathias, producers; Stephanie Meurer, produced by	IFC
2016 (68th)	Drunk History (Season 3)	Adam McKay, Will Ferrell, Owen Burke, Derek Waters and Jeremy Konner, executive producers; Seth Weitberg, co-executive producer; Melissa Wylie, produced by	Comedy Central
2016 (68th)	Inside Amy Schumer (Season 4)	Amy Schumer, Daniel Jason Powell, Jessi Klein, Steven Ast and Tony Hernandez, executive producers; Kim Caramele and Kevin Kane, supervising producers; Ayesha Rokadia, Ryan Cunningham, Tami Sagher, Christine Nangle, Kurt Metzger and Kyle Dunnigan, producers	Comedy Central
2016 (68th)	Portlandia (Season 6)	Lorne Michaels, Fred Armisen, Carrie Brownstein, Jonathan Krisel and Andrew Singer, executive producers; Karey Dornetto, Graham Wagner and Alice Mathias, co-executive producers; David Cress, producer	IFC
2016 (68th)	Saturday Night Live (Season 41)	Lorne Michaels, executive producer; Ken Aymong, supervising producer; Lindsay Shookus and Erin Doyle, producers; Steve Higgins and Erik Kenward, produced by	NBC
2017 (69th)
2017 (69th)	Saturday Night Live (Season 42)	Lorne Michaels, executive producer; Ken Aymong, supervising producer; Lindsay Shookus and Erin Doyle, producers; Steve Higgins and Erik Kenward, produced by	NBC
2017 (69th)	Billy on the Street (Season 5)	Billy Eichner, Mike Farah, Anna Wenger, Doug Brady, Richard Kathlean and Bill Parker, executive producers; Elizabeth Baquet and Mary Zappulla, supervising producers	truTV
2017 (69th)	Documentary Now! (Season 2)	Lorne Michaels, Fred Armisen, Bill Hader, Seth Meyers, Alex Buono, Rhys Thomas and Andrew Singer, executive producers; John Mulaney, co-executive producer; Alice Mathias, producer; Scott Sites, produced by	IFC
2017 (69th)	Drunk History (Season 4)	Adam McKay, Will Ferrell, Derek Waters, Jeremy Konner and Owen Burke, executive producers; Melissa Wylie, produced by	Comedy Central
2017 (69th)	Portlandia (Season 7)	Lorne Michaels, Fred Armisen, Carrie Brownstein, Jonathan Krisel and Andrew Singer, executive producers; Graham Wagner and Alice Mathias, co-executive producers; David Cress, producer	IFC
2017 (69th)	Tracey Ullman's Show (Season 1)	Tracey Ullman, Ben Farrell and Myfanwy Moore, executive producers; Caroline Norris, producer	HBO
2018 (70th)
2018 (70th)	Saturday Night Live (Season 43)	Lorne Michaels, executive producer; Ken Aymong, supervising producer; Lindsay Shookus, Erin Doyle and Tom Broecker, producers; Steve Higgins and Erik Kenward, produced by	NBC
2018 (70th)	At Home with Amy Sedaris (Season 1)	Amy Sedaris, Paul Dinello, Cindy Caponera, Vernon Chatman, John Lee and Alyson Levy, executive producers; Bernie Kaminski, co-executive producer; Jodi Lennon, Ryan Cunningham and Daria Scoccimarro, producers	truTV
2018 (70th)	Drunk History (Season 5)	Will Ferrell, Adam McKay, Owen Burke, Derek Waters and Jeremy Konner, executive producers; Greg Tuculescu, co-executive producer; Zachary Halley, produced by	Comedy Central
2018 (70th)	I Love You, America with Sarah Silverman (Season 1)	Sarah Silverman, Amy Zvi, Adam McKay, Will Ferrell, Gavin Purcell and Joe Farrell, executive producers; David Ferguson, Meaghan Rady and Becca Kinskey, co-executive producers; Allyce Ozarski, produced by	Hulu
2018 (70th)	Portlandia (Season 8)	Lorne Michaels, Fred Armisen, Carrie Brownstein, Jonathan Krisel, Andrew Singer, Graham Wagner, Alice Mathias and Karey Dornetto, executive producers; David Cress, producer	IFC
2018 (70th)	Tracey Ullman's Show (Season 2)	Tracey Ullman, executive producer; Caroline Norris, producer	HBO
2019 (71st)
2019 (71st)	Saturday Night Live (Season 44)	Lorne Michaels, executive producer; Ken Aymong, supervising producer; Lindsay Shookus, Erin Doyle and Tom Broecker, producers; Steve Higgins and Erik Kenward; produced by	NBC
2019 (71st)	At Home with Amy Sedaris (Season 2)	Amy Sedaris, Ravi Nandan and Bill Benz, executive producers; Inman Young, Jeanie Igoe and Jodi Lennon, producers	truTV
2019 (71st)	Documentary Now! (Season 3)	Lorne Michaels, Fred Armisen, Bill Hader, Seth Meyers, Alex Buono, Rhys Thomas and Andrew Singer, executive producers; Alice Mathias, co-executive producer; Matt Pacult and Tamsin Rawady, producers; David Cress, produced by	IFC
2019 (71st)	Drunk History (Season 5–6)	Derek Waters, Jeremy Konner, Will Ferrell, Adam McKay and Owen Burke, executive producers; Greg Tuculescu, co-executive producer; Zachary Halley, produced by	Comedy Central
2019 (71st)	I Love You, America with Sarah Silverman (Season 2)	Sarah Silverman, Amy Zvi, Adam McKay, Will Ferrell, Gavin Purcell, Joe Farrell, Bellamie Blackstone and Dave Ferguson, executive producers; Becca Kinskey and Meaghan Rady, co-executive producers; Eric B. Shanks, supervising producer	Hulu
2019 (71st)	Who Is America? (Season 1)	Sacha Baron Cohen, Anthony Hines, Todd Schulman, Andrew Newman, Dan Mazer and Adam Lowitt, executive producers; Nicholas Hatton, Daniel Gray Longino, Dan Swimer, Tim Allsop and Debra Neil-Fisher, producers; Melanie J. Elin, produced by	Showtime

=== 2020s ===
Year	Program	Producers	Network
Outstanding Variety Sketch Series
2020 (72nd)
2020 (72nd)	Saturday Night Live (Season 45)	Lorne Michaels, executive producer; Ken Aymong, supervising producer; Lindsay Shookus, Erin Doyle and Tom Broecker, producers; Steve Higgins and Erik Kenward, produced by	NBC
2020 (72nd)	A Black Lady Sketch Show (Season 1)	Robin Thede, Issa Rae, Tony Hernandez, Brooke Posch, Dave Becky and Jonathan Berry, executive producers; Lauren Ashley Smith and Dime Davis, co-executive producers; Deniese Davis, Montrel McKay and John Skidmore, producers; Erin Owens, produced by	HBO
2020 (72nd)	Drunk History (Season 6)	Will Ferrell, Adam McKay, Derek Waters, Jeremy Konner and Owen Burke, executive producers; Greg Tuculescu, co-executive producer; Zachary Halley, produced by	Comedy Central
2021 (73rd)
2021 (73rd)	Saturday Night Live (Season 46)	Lorne Michaels, executive producer; Ken Aymong, supervising producer; Lindsay Shookus, Erin Doyle, Tom Broecker and Caroline Maroney, producers; Steve Higgins and Erik Kenward, produced by	NBC
2021 (73rd)	A Black Lady Sketch Show (Season 2)	Robin Thede, Issa Rae, Tony Hernandez, Brooke Posch, Dave Becky and Jonathan Berry, executive producers; Lauren Ashley Smith, co-executive producer; Deniese Davis, Montrel McKay and John Skidmore, producers; Linda Morel, produced by	HBO
2022 (74th)
2022 (74th)	Saturday Night Live (Season 47)	Lorne Michaels, executive producer; Javier Winnik, supervising producer; Lindsay Shookus, Erin Doyle, Tom Broecker and Caroline Maroney, producers; Steve Higgins and Erik Kenward, produced by	NBC
2022 (74th)	A Black Lady Sketch Show (Season 3)	Robin Thede, Issa Rae, Tony Hernandez, Brooke Posch, Dave Becky and Jonathan Berry, executive producers; Tracey Ashley and Bridget Stokes, co-executive producers; Chloé Hilliard, Deniese Davis, Montrel McKay and John Skidmore, producers; Linda Morel, produced by	HBO
Outstanding Scripted Variety Series
2023 (75th)
2023 (75th)	Last Week Tonight with John Oliver	John Oliver, executive producer/host; Tim Carvell and Liz Stanton, executive producers; Jeremy Tchaban, co-executive producer; Catherine Owens, supervising producer; Whit Conway, Kaye Foley, Laura L. Griffin, Christopher McDaniel, Kate Mullaney, Matt Passet, Megan Peck Shub, Wynn Van Dusen, Marian Wang and Charles Wilson, producers; Nicole Franza, line producer	HBO
2023 (75th)	A Black Lady Sketch Show (Season 4)	Robin Thede, Issa Rae, Tony Hernandez, Brooke Posch, Dave Becky and Jonathan Berry, executive producers; Chloé Hilliard, Linda Morel, Monique Moses and Bridget Stokes, co-executive producers; Corin Wells, Montrel McKay and John Skidmore, producers	HBO
2023 (75th)	Saturday Night Live (Season 48)	Lorne Michaels, executive producer; Javier Winnik, supervising producer; Erin Doyle, Tom Broecker and Caroline Maroney, producers; Steve Higgins and Erik Kenward, produced by	NBC
2024 (76th)
2024 (76th)	Last Week Tonight with John Oliver	John Oliver, executive producer/host; Tim Carvell and Liz Stanton, executive producers; Jeremy Tchaban, co-executive producer; Catherine Owens, supervising producer; Whit Conway, Kaye Foley, Laura L. Griffin, Christopher McDaniel, Kate Mullaney, Matt Passet, Megan Peck Shub, Wynn Van Dusen, Marian Wang, Charles Wilson and Rebecca Etchberger, producers; Nicole Franza, line producer	HBO
2024 (76th)	Saturday Night Live (Season 49)	Lorne Michaels, executive producer; Javier Winnik, supervising producer; Erin Doyle, Tom Broecker and Caroline Maroney, producers; Steve Higgins and Erik Kenward, produced by	NBC
2025 (77th)
2025 (77th)	Last Week Tonight with John Oliver	John Oliver, executive producer/host; Tim Carvell and Liz Stanton, executive producers; Jeremy Tchaban, co-executive producer; Catherine Owens, supervising producer; Rebecca Etchberger, Laura L. Griffin, Kaye Foley, Christopher McDaniel, Kate Mullaney, Matt Passet, Marian Wang, Charles Wilson and Wynn Van Dusen, producers; Nicole Franza, line producer	HBO
2025 (77th)	Saturday Night Live (Season 50)	Lorne Michaels, executive producer; Javier Winnik, supervising producer; Erin Doyle, Tom Broecker and Caroline Maroney, producers; Steve Higgins and Erik Kenward, produced by	NBC

== Programs with multiple wins ==
Totals include wins for Outstanding Variety Series.

10 wins

- Last Week Tonight with John Oliver (consecutive) (Note: Total includes Last Week Tonight with John Oliver's wins for Outstanding Variety Talk Series)

8 wins

- Saturday Night Live (6 consecutive)

== Programs with multiple nominations ==
Totals include nominations for Outstanding Variety Series.

31 nominations

- Saturday Night Live

12 nominations

- Last Week Tonight with John Oliver

6 nominations

- Drunk History

4 nominations

- A Black Lady Sketch Show
- Portlandia

3 nominations

- Documentary Now!

2 nominations

- At Home with Amy Sedaris
- I Love You, America with Sarah Silverman
- Inside Amy Schumer
- Key & Peele
- Tracey Ullman's Show

== Total awards by network ==
- NBC – 6
- HBO – 3
- Comedy Central – 2
