= List of Portlandia episodes =

Portlandia is an American satire television series created by Fred Armisen, Carrie Brownstein and Jonathan Krisel. The series stars Armisen and Brownstein. It premiered on January 21, 2011, on IFC. During the course of the series, 77 episodes of Portlandia aired over eight seasons.

== Series overview ==
Season	Episodes	Originally released	
Season	Episodes	First released	Last released
1	6	January 21, 2011	February 25, 2011
2	10	January 6, 2012	March 9, 2012
3	11	December 14, 2012	March 1, 2013
4	10	February 27, 2014	May 1, 2014
5	10	January 8, 2015	March 12, 2015
6	10	January 21, 2016	March 24, 2016
7	10	January 5, 2017	March 9, 2017
8	10	January 18, 2018	March 22, 2018

== Episodes ==
=== Season 1 (2011) ===
No. overall	No. in season	Title	Directed by	Written by	Original release date	US viewers (millions)
1	1	"Farm"	Jonathan Krisel	Fred Armisen, Carrie Brownstein, Jonathan Krisel, Allison Silverman	January 21, 2011	0.263
2	2	"A Song for Portland"	Jonathan Krisel	Fred Armisen, Carrie Brownstein, Jonathan Krisel, Allison Silverman	January 28, 2011	0.186
3	3	"Aimee"	Jonathan Krisel	Fred Armisen, Carrie Brownstein, Jonathan Krisel, Allison Silverman	February 4, 2011	0.178
4	4	"Mayor Is Missing"	Jonathan Krisel	Fred Armisen, Carrie Brownstein, Jonathan Krisel, Allison Silverman	February 11, 2011	N/A
5	5	"Blunderbuss"	Jonathan Krisel	Fred Armisen, Carrie Brownstein, Jonathan Krisel, Allison Silverman	February 18, 2011	N/A
6	6	"Baseball"	Jonathan Krisel	Fred Armisen, Carrie Brownstein, Jonathan Krisel, Allison Silverman	February 25, 2011	N/A

=== Season 2 (2012) ===
No. overall	No. in season	Title	Directed by	Written by	Original release date
7	1	"Mixologist"	Jonathan Krisel	Fred Armisen, Carrie Brownstein, Karey Dornetto, Jonathan Krisel	January 6, 2012
8	2	"One Moore Episode"	Jonathan Krisel	Fred Armisen, Carrie Brownstein, Karey Dornetto, Jonathan Krisel	January 13, 2012
9	3	"Cool Wedding"	Jonathan Krisel	Fred Armisen, Carrie Brownstein, Karey Dornetto, Jonathan Krisel	January 20, 2012
10	4	"Grover"	Jonathan Krisel	Fred Armisen, Carrie Brownstein, Karey Dornetto, Jonathan Krisel	January 27, 2012
11	5	"Cops Redesign"	Jonathan Krisel	Fred Armisen, Carrie Brownstein, Karey Dornetto, Jonathan Krisel	February 3, 2012
12	6	"Cat Nap"	Jonathan Krisel	Fred Armisen, Carrie Brownstein, Karey Dornetto, Jonathan Krisel	February 10, 2012
13	7	"Motorcycle"	Jonathan Krisel	Fred Armisen, Carrie Brownstein, Karey Dornetto, Jonathan Krisel	February 17, 2012
14	8	"Feminist Bookstore's 10th Anniversary"	Jonathan Krisel	Fred Armisen, Carrie Brownstein, Karey Dornetto, Jonathan Krisel	February 24, 2012
15	9	"No Olympics"	Jonathan Krisel	Fred Armisen, Carrie Brownstein, Karey Dornetto, Jonathan Krisel	March 2, 2012
16	10	"Brunch Village"	Jonathan Krisel	Fred Armisen, Carrie Brownstein, Karey Dornetto, Jonathan Krisel, Bill Oakley	March 9, 2012

=== Season 3 (2012–13) ===
No. overall	No. in season	Title	Directed by	Written by	Original release date
17	1	"Winter in Portlandia"	Jonathan Krisel	Fred Armisen, Carrie Brownstein, Jonathan Krisel, Bill Oakley	December 14, 2012
18	2	"Take Back MTV"	Jonathan Krisel	Fred Armisen, Carrie Brownstein, Jonathan Krisel, Bill Oakley	January 4, 2013
19	3	"Missionaries"	Jonathan Krisel	Fred Armisen, Carrie Brownstein, Jonathan Krisel, Bill Oakley	January 4, 2013
20	4	"Nina's Birthday"	Jonathan Krisel	Fred Armisen, Carrie Brownstein, Jonathan Krisel, Bill Oakley	January 11, 2013
21	5	"Squiggleman"	Jonathan Krisel	Fred Armisen, Carrie Brownstein, Jonathan Krisel, Bill Oakley	January 18, 2013
22	6	"Off the Grid"	Jonathan Krisel	Fred Armisen, Carrie Brownstein, Jonathan Krisel, Bill Oakley	January 25, 2013
23	7	"The Temp"	Jonathan Krisel	Fred Armisen, Carrie Brownstein, Jonathan Krisel, Bill Oakley	February 1, 2013
24	8	"Soft Opening"	Jonathan Krisel	Fred Armisen, Carrie Brownstein, Jonathan Krisel, Bill Oakley	February 8, 2013
25	9	"Alexandra"	Jonathan Krisel	Fred Armisen, Carrie Brownstein, Jonathan Krisel, Bill Oakley	February 15, 2013
26	10	"No-Fo-O-Fo-Bridge"	Jonathan Krisel	Fred Armisen, Carrie Brownstein, Jonathan Krisel, Bill Oakley	February 22, 2013
27	11	"Blackout"	Jonathan Krisel	Fred Armisen, Carrie Brownstein, Jonathan Krisel, Bill Oakley	March 1, 2013

=== Season 4 (2014) ===
No. overall	No. in season	Title	Directed by	Written by	Original release date	US viewers (millions)
28	1	"Sharing Finances"	Jonathan Krisel	Fred Armisen, Carrie Brownstein, Jonathan Krisel, Karey Dornetto, Graham Wagner	February 27, 2014	0.314
29	2	"Ecoterrorists"	Jonathan Krisel	Fred Armisen, Carrie Brownstein, Jonathan Krisel, Karey Dornetto, Graham Wagner	March 6, 2014	0.152
30	3	"Celery"	Jonathan Krisel	Fred Armisen, Carrie Brownstein, Jonathan Krisel, Karey Dornetto, Graham Wagner	March 13, 2014	0.189
31	4	"Pull-Out King"	Jonathan Krisel	Fred Armisen, Carrie Brownstein, Jonathan Krisel, Karey Dornetto, Graham Wagner	March 20, 2014	0.135
32	5	"Spyke Drives"	Jonathan Krisel	Fred Armisen, Carrie Brownstein, Jonathan Krisel, Karey Dornetto, Graham Wagner	March 27, 2014	0.158
33	6	"Bahama Knights"	Jonathan Krisel	Fred Armisen, Carrie Brownstein, Jonathan Krisel, Karey Dornetto, Graham Wagner	April 3, 2014	0.216
34	7	"Trail Blazers"	Jonathan Krisel	Fred Armisen, Carrie Brownstein, Jonathan Krisel, Karey Dornetto, Graham Wagner	April 10, 2014	0.231
35	8	"Late in Life Drug Use"	Jonathan Krisel	Fred Armisen, Carrie Brownstein, Jonathan Krisel, Karey Dornetto, Graham Wagner	April 17, 2014	0.105
36	9	"3D Printer"	Jonathan Krisel	Fred Armisen, Carrie Brownstein, Jonathan Krisel, Karey Dornetto, Graham Wagner	April 24, 2014	0.206
37	10	"Getting Away"	Jonathan Krisel	Fred Armisen, Carrie Brownstein, Jonathan Krisel, Karey Dornetto, Graham Wagner	May 1, 2014	0.156

=== Season 5 (2015) ===
No. overall	No. in season	Title	Directed by	Written by	Original release date	US viewers (millions)
38	1	"The Story of Toni and Candace"	Jonathan Krisel	Fred Armisen, Carrie Brownstein, Jonathan Krisel, Karey Dornetto, Graham Wagner	January 8, 2015	0.218
39	2	"The Fiance"	Jonathan Krisel	Fred Armisen, Carrie Brownstein, Jonathan Krisel, Karey Dornetto, Graham Wagner	January 15, 2015	0.223
40	3	"Healthcare"	Jonathan Krisel	Fred Armisen, Carrie Brownstein, Jonathan Krisel, Karey Dornetto, Graham Wagner	January 22, 2015	0.230
41	4	"SeaWorld"	Jonathan Krisel	Fred Armisen, Carrie Brownstein, Jonathan Krisel, Karey Dornetto, Graham Wagner	January 29, 2015	0.184
42	5	"4th of July"	Jonathan Krisel	Fred Armisen, Carrie Brownstein, Jonathan Krisel, Karey Dornetto, Graham Wagner	February 5, 2015	0.159
43	6	"Fashion"	Jonathan Krisel	Fred Armisen, Carrie Brownstein, Jonathan Krisel, Karey Dornetto, Graham Wagner	February 12, 2015	0.140
44	7	"Doug Becomes a Feminist"	Daniel Gray Longino	Fred Armisen, Carrie Brownstein, Jonathan Krisel, Karey Dornetto, Graham Wagner	February 19, 2015	0.194
45	8	"House for Sale"	Steve Buscemi	Fred Armisen, Carrie Brownstein, Jonathan Krisel, Karey Dornetto, Graham Wagner	February 26, 2015	0.169
46	9	"You Can Call Me Al"	Jonathan Krisel	Fred Armisen, Carrie Brownstein, Jonathan Krisel, Karey Dornetto, Graham Wagner	March 5, 2015	0.218
47	10	"Dead Pets"	Jonathan Krisel	Fred Armisen, Carrie Brownstein, Jonathan Krisel, Karey Dornetto, Graham Wagner	March 12, 2015	0.248

=== Season 6 (2016) ===
No. overall	No. in season	Title	Directed by	Written by	Original release date	US viewers (millions)
48	1	"Pickathon"	Bill Benz	Fred Armisen, Carrie Brownstein, Jonathan Krisel, Karey Dornetto, Graham Wagner	January 21, 2016	0.207
49	2	"Going Gray"	Jonathan Krisel	Fred Armisen, Carrie Brownstein, Jonathan Krisel, Karey Dornetto, Graham Wagner	January 28, 2016	0.159
50	3	"Shville"	Jonathan Krisel	Fred Armisen, Carrie Brownstein, Jonathan Krisel, Karey Dornetto, Graham Wagner	February 4, 2016	0.152
51	4	"Weirdo Beach"	Daniel Gray Longino	Fred Armisen, Carrie Brownstein, Jonathan Krisel, Karey Dornetto, Graham Wagner	February 11, 2016	0.163
52	5	"Breaking Up"	Jonathan Krisel	Fred Armisen, Carrie Brownstein, Jonathan Krisel, Karey Dornetto, Graham Wagner	February 18, 2016	0.165
53	6	"TADA"	Daniel Gray Longino	Fred Armisen, Carrie Brownstein, Jonathan Krisel, Karey Dornetto, Graham Wagner	February 25, 2016	0.116
54	7	"Family Emergency"	Steve Buscemi	Fred Armisen, Carrie Brownstein, Jonathan Krisel, Karey Dornetto, Graham Wagner	March 3, 2016	0.136
55	8	"First Feminist City"	Steve Buscemi	Fred Armisen, Carrie Brownstein, Jonathan Krisel, Karey Dornetto, Graham Wagner	March 10, 2016	0.127
56	9	"Lance is Smart"	Jonathan Krisel	Fred Armisen, Carrie Brownstein, Jonathan Krisel, Karey Dornetto, Graham Wagner	March 17, 2016	0.131
57	10	"Noodle Monster"	Jonathan Krisel	Fred Armisen, Carrie Brownstein, Jonathan Krisel, Karey Dornetto, Graham Wagner	March 24, 2016	0.120

=== Season 7 (2017) ===
No. overall	No. in season	Title	Directed by	Written by	Original release date	US viewers (millions)
58	1	"The Storytellers"	Carrie Brownstein	Fred Armisen, Carrie Brownstein, Jonathan Krisel, Karen Kilgariff, Graham Wagner	January 5, 2017	0.161
59	2	"Carrie Dates a Hunk"	Jonathan Krisel	Fred Armisen, Carrie Brownstein, Jonathan Krisel, Karen Kilgariff, Graham Wagner	January 12, 2017	0.134
60	3	"Fred's Cell Phone Company"	Carrie Brownstein	Fred Armisen, Carrie Brownstein, Jonathan Krisel, Karen Kilgariff, Graham Wagner	January 19, 2017	0.121
61	4	"Separation Anxiety"	Bill Benz	Fred Armisen, Carrie Brownstein, Jonathan Krisel, Karen Kilgariff, Graham Wagner	January 26, 2017	0.126
62	5	"Amore"	Bill Benz	Fred Armisen, Carrie Brownstein, Jonathan Krisel, Karen Kilgariff, Graham Wagner	February 2, 2017	0.175
63	6	"Friend Replacement"	Jonathan Krisel	Fred Armisen, Carrie Brownstein, Jonathan Krisel, Karen Kilgariff, Graham Wagner	February 9, 2017	0.122
64	7	"Portland Secedes"	Bill Benz	Fred Armisen, Carrie Brownstein, Jonathan Krisel, Karen Kilgariff, Graham Wagner	February 16, 2017	0.145
65	8	"Ants"	Alice Mathias	Fred Armisen, Carrie Brownstein, Jonathan Krisel, Karen Kilgariff, Graham Wagner	February 23, 2017	0.115
66	9	"Passenger Rating"	Steve Buscemi	Fred Armisen, Carrie Brownstein, Jonathan Krisel, Karen Kilgariff, Graham Wagner	March 2, 2017	0.109
67	10	"Misunderstood Miracles"	Fred Armisen	Fred Armisen, Carrie Brownstein, Jonathan Krisel, Karen Kilgariff, Graham Wagner	March 9, 2017	0.126

=== Season 8 (2018) ===
No. overall	No. in season	Title	Directed by	Written by	Original release date	US viewers (millions)
68	1	"Riot Spray"	Carrie Brownstein	Fred Armisen, Carrie Brownstein, Jonathan Krisel, Karey Dornetto, Megan Neuringer, Phoebe Robinson, Graham Wagner	January 18, 2018	0.152
69	2	"Shared Workspace"	Graham Wagner	Fred Armisen, Carrie Brownstein, Jonathan Krisel, Karey Dornetto, Megan Neuringer, Phoebe Robinson, Graham Wagner	January 25, 2018	0.104
70	3	"No Thank You"	Carrie Brownstein	Fred Armisen, Carrie Brownstein, Jonathan Krisel, Karey Dornetto, Megan Neuringer, Phoebe Robinson, Graham Wagner	February 1, 2018	0.100
71	4	"Abracadabra"	Lance Bangs	Fred Armisen, Carrie Brownstein, Jonathan Krisel, Karey Dornetto, Megan Neuringer, Phoebe Robinson, Graham Wagner	February 8, 2018	0.130
72	5	"Open Relationship"	Bill Benz	Fred Armisen, Carrie Brownstein, Jonathan Krisel, Karey Dornetto, Megan Neuringer, Phoebe Robinson, Graham Wagner	February 15, 2018	0.124
73	6	"You Do You"	Bill Benz & Ali Greer	Fred Armisen, Carrie Brownstein, Jonathan Krisel, Karey Dornetto, Megan Neuringer, Phoebe Robinson, Graham Wagner	February 22, 2018	0.100
74	7	"Most Pro City"	Bill Benz	Fred Armisen, Carrie Brownstein, Jonathan Krisel, Karey Dornetto, Megan Neuringer, Phoebe Robinson, Graham Wagner	March 1, 2018	0.100
75	8	"Peter Follows P!nk"	Bill Benz	Fred Armisen, Carrie Brownstein, Jonathan Krisel, Karey Dornetto, Megan Neuringer, Phoebe Robinson, Graham Wagner	March 8, 2018	0.108
76	9	"Long Way Back"	Lance Bangs	Fred Armisen, Carrie Brownstein, Jonathan Krisel, Karey Dornetto, Megan Neuringer, Phoebe Robinson, Graham Wagner	March 15, 2018	0.084
77	10	"Rose Route"	Bill Benz	Fred Armisen, Carrie Brownstein, Jonathan Krisel, Karey Dornetto, Megan Neuringer, Phoebe Robinson, Graham Wagner	March 22, 2018	0.136

== Specials ==
Title	Directed by	Written by	Original air date
"The Brunch Special"	Jonathan Krisel	Fred Armisen, Carrie Brownstein, Karey Dornetto, Jonathan Krisel & Bill Oakley	July 20, 2012
An hour-long "director's cut" of the episode "Brunch Village". The special adds incidents concerning the attractive woman behind Peter and Nance in line, an irate patron, the restaurant's elaborate PA system, and a fair that springs up alongside. An extended "behind-the-scenes" segment describes director Jonathan Krisel's epic struggle to obtain the right marionberries for the restaurant scene.
"The Celery Incident"	Jonathan Krisel	Fred Armisen, Carrie Brownstein, Karey Dornetto, Jonathan Krisel & Bill Oakley	February 20, 2014
Ahead of the Season 4 premiere, a sketch from the then–upcoming episode "Celery" was edited into an 11-minute segment and later released online.
