= Fred Armisen filmography =

Overview of the American actor and comedian's visual work

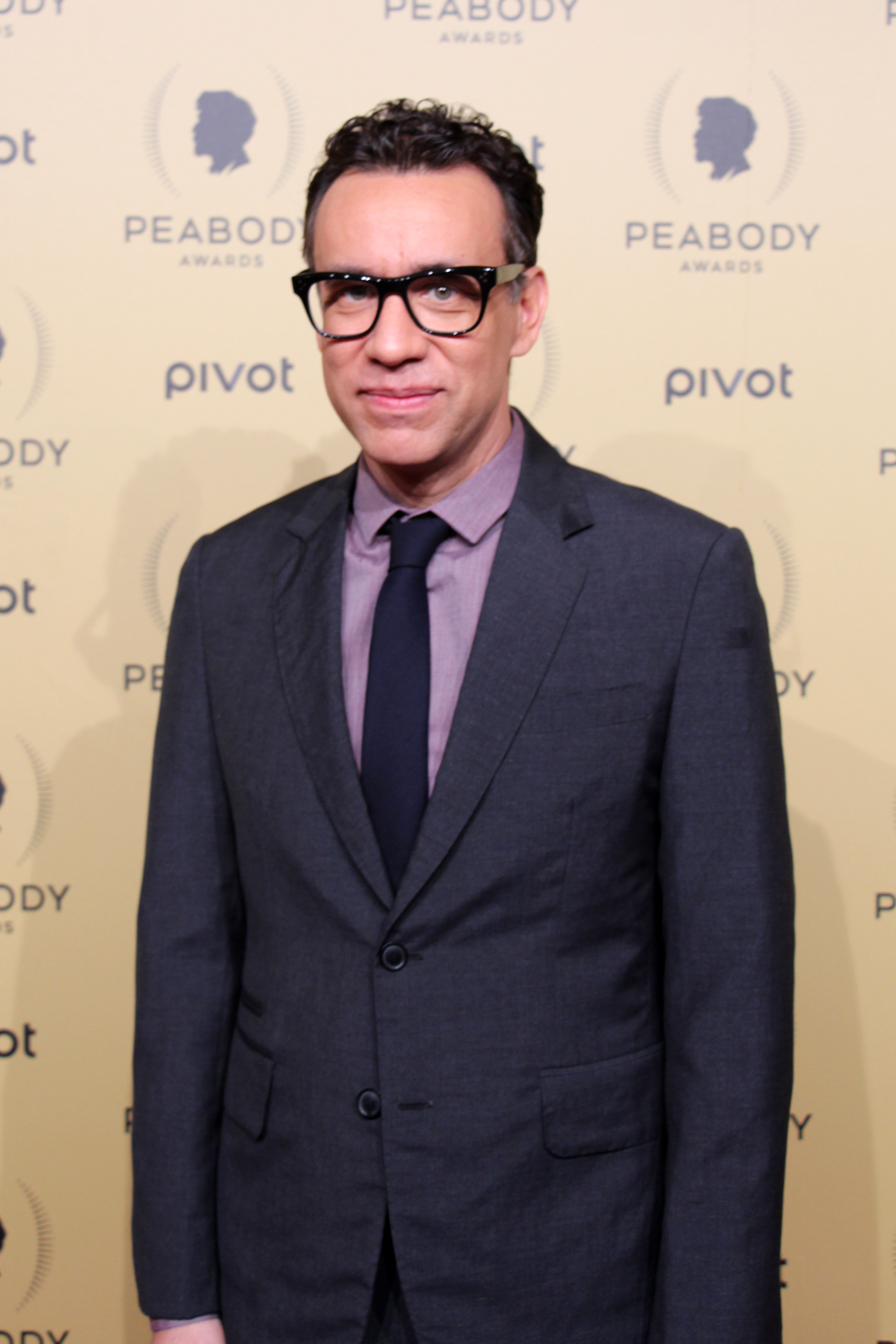
Armisen at the 2015 Peabody Awards

Fred Armisen is an American actor, comedian, writer, producer, and musician.

He is known for his work on various television shows including Saturday Night Live, Portlandia, Documentary Now!, Moonbase 8, and Big Mouth.

== Film ==
Year	Title	Role	Notes	Ref.
1998	Guide to Music and South by Southwest	Various	Short film	
1998	Fred Armisen's Guide to Dance and Self-Defense	Various	Short film	
2002	I Am Trying to Break Your Heart: A Film About Wilco	Himself		
2002	Like Mike	New Age Dad		
2003	Frank International Film Festival	Frank	Short film	
2003	Melvin Goes to Dinner	Vesa		
2004	Anchorman: The Legend of Ron Burgundy	Tino		
2004	Eurotrip	Creepy Italian Guy		
2004	Wake Up, Ron Burgundy: The Lost Movie	Tino		
2005	Deuce Bigalow: European Gigolo	Frenchman	Uncredited	
2006	Deck the Halls	Gustave		
2006	The Ex	Manny		
2006	Griffin & Phoenix	Unknown		
2006	Kiss Me Again	Professor Szabo		
2006	Tenacious D in The Pick of Destiny	Security Guard		
2007	Aqua Teen Hunger Force Colon Movie Film for Theaters	Time Lincoln	Voice	
2008	Baby Mama	Stroller Salesman		
2008	Christmas on Mars	Noachis		
2008	The Promotion	Scott Fargas		
2008	The Rocker	Wayne Kerr		
2008	Bang Blow & Stroke	Kerr	Short film	
2009	Confessions of a Shopaholic	Ryan Koening		
2009	Post Grad	Guacanator Pitchman		
2010	Cop Out	Russian Lawyer		
2010	Our Family Wedding	Phillip Gusto		
2010	Easy A	Pastor Bryant		
2010	Cats & Dogs: The Revenge of Kitty Galore	Freidrich		
2010	Presidential Reunion	Barack Obama		
2011	The Smurfs	Brainy Smurf	Voice	
2011	The Smurfs: A Christmas Carol	Brainy Smurf	Voice	
2012	The Dictator	Death to Aladeen Restaurant waiter	Cameo	
2012	Fun World	Fred	Voice; short film	
2013	The Smurfs 2	Brainy Smurf	Voice	
2013	The Smurfs: The Legend of Smurfy Hollow	Brainy Smurf	Voice	
2014	Salad Days	Himself	Documentary	
2015	Addicted to Fresno	Gerald		
2015	Staten Island Summer	Victor		
2015	Looney Tunes: Rabbits Run	Speedy Gonzales	Voice, direct-to-video	
2015	The Damned: Don't You Wish That We Were Dead	Himself	Documentary	
2016	Zoolander 2	The VIP		
2016	Ordinary World	Gary		
2017	The Little Hours	Bishop Bartolomeo		
2017	Take the 10	Driver		
2017	Band Aid	Dave		
2017	The House of Tomorrow	Tour Video Narrator	Voice	
2017	Battle of the Sexes	Rheo Blair		
2017	The Lego Ninjago Movie	Cole	Voice	
2017	Zane's Stand Up Promo	Cole	Voice	
2018	Game Over, Man!	Himself		
2019	Jay and Silent Bob Reboot	Uber Driver		
2020	All Together Now	Mr. Franks		
2021	How It Ends	Manny		
2021	Too Late	Fredo Muñoz		
2021	The Mitchells vs. the Machines	Deborahbot 5000	Voice	
2022	Spin Me Round	Ricky		
2022	The Bubble	Darren Eigan		
2022	Clerks III	Auditioner		
2023	The Super Mario Bros. Movie	Cranky Kong	Voice	
2023	The Contestant	Narrator	Voice	
2024	Unfrosted	Mike Puntz		
2024	Thelma the Unicorn	Danny Stallion	Voice	
2025	Fixed	Fetch	Voice	
2025	Nimrods	Jim		
2026	Diary of a Wimpy Kid Christmas: The Getaway	Director of Fun	Voice	

== Television ==
Year	Title	Role	Notes
1997–2001	Reverb	Interviewer	82 episodes
1999	Fred	Himself / Various	Pilot
2001	Late Friday	Father Fred, Fericito	2 episodes
2001	Premium Blend	Sergeant Fred	2 episodes
2002	Next!	Various	Pilot
2002	Late World with Zach	Interpretive Bongos Wizard / Various	34 episodes
2002–2013	Saturday Night Live	Various	229 episodes Featured player (seasons 28–29) Repertory player (seasons 30–38)
2003–2007	Crank Yankers	Chip Douglas	Voice; 13 episodes (seasons 2, 4)
2004	Comedy Lab	Jeremy	1 episode
2004, 2008	Aqua Teen Hunger Force	Poncho / Robot Husband	Voice (2 episodes)
2005	New York Noise	Himself	Episode: "Beggars Group 10th Anniversary in NYC Party"
2005–2011	Squidbillies	Miguel / Jesus / Hippie	Voice; 18 episodes (seasons 1–6)
2006	Freak Show	Various	Voice, 3 episodes
2006	Night of Too Many Stars	Himself, Prince	Television special
2006	Tom Goes to the Mayor	Phillip Priest	Voice, episode: "Jeffy the Sea Serpent"
2007, 2012	30 Rock	Raheem Haddad / Phone Lady	2 episodes
2007	Tim and Eric Nite Live!	Dr. Pat Gordon Hall	1 episode
2007–2008	Human Giant	Himself / Dr. Marker / Doctor	3 episodes
2007, 2010	Yo Gabba Gabba!	Himself / Larry the Treasure Hunter	2 episodes
2008	The Sarah Silverman Program	Taylor Magenheim	Episode: "Patriot Tact"
2008	Blue Man Group: How to Be a Megastar 2.0	Rod Popeil	Television film
2008–2012	Saturday Night Live Weekend Update Thursday	Various	8 episodes
2008, 2010	Tim and Eric Awesome Show, Great Job!	Various	2 episodes
2009	Parks and Recreation	Raul Alejandro Bastilla Pedro de Veloso de Maldonado	Episode: "Sister City"
2010	Ugly Americans	Larry King	Voice; episode: "So You Want to Be a Vampire?"
2011–2018	Portlandia	Various	8 seasons, also co-creator, writer and executive producer
2011–2013	The Looney Tunes Show	Speedy Gonzales	Voice; main role (30 episodes)
2011	The Soup	Himself, CARL	Episode: "Fred Armisen"
2012	Up All Night	Gideon Kirk	Episode: "Hey Jealousy"
2012–2013	Late Night with Jimmy Fallon	Lady Hedith	5 episodes
2012–2023	The Simpsons	Terrence	Voice, 2 episodes
2012	Unsupervised	Martin	Voice; recurring role (6 episodes)
2013	Bob's Burgers	Tommy	Voice; episode: "Nude Beach"
2013	Conan	Conan O'Brien	Episode: "Occupy Conan: When Outsourcing Goes Too Far"
2013	Kroll Show	Papi Jr	Episode: "Dine & Dash"
2013	Jimmy Kimmel Live!	Osama bin Laden	1 episode
2013	Out There	Terry Rosachristas	Voice; main role (10 episodes)
2013	The Awesomes	Stage Manager	Voice; episode: "Pilot, Part 2"
2013–2021	Brooklyn Nine-Nine	Mlep(clay)nos	4 episodes (seasons 1, 5, 8)
2014	Super Fun Night	Brian Headfoot	Episode: "Hostile Makeover"
2014	Broad City	Craigslist Baby	Episode: "What a Wonderful World"
2014	House of Lies	Vincent	Episode: "Comeuppance"
2014	Chozen	Various	Voice; episode: "In a Pickle"
2014	Modern Family	Langham	Episode: "Las Vegas"
2014	Comedy Bang! Bang!	Himself	Episode: "Fred Armisen Wears Black Jeans & Glasses"
2014	Comedians in Cars Getting Coffee	Himself	Episode: "I Wasn't Told About This"
2014	Archer	Gustavo Calderon	Voice; 5 episodes (season 5)
2014	Elf: Buddy's Musical Christmas	Chadwick	Voice, television film
2014–2024	Late Night with Seth Meyers	Himself	Band leader
2014–2020	Mike Tyson Mysteries	Leprechaun, Raul Castro, Lucifuge	Voice; episode: "Is Magic Real?"
2015	30th Independent Spirit Awards	Himself (host)	Television special
2015	Man Seeking Woman	Tanaka	Episode: "Sizzurp"
2015	7 Days in Hell	Edward Pudding	Television film
2015	The Jim Gaffigan Show	Dr. Weiss	Episode: "Pilot"
2015–2017	Difficult People	Garry Epstein	3 episodes (seasons 1–3)
2015–2022	Documentary Now!	Various	Also co-creator, writer and executive producer
2015–2021	Robot Chicken	Various	Voice; 4 episodes (seasons 8–9, 11)
2016	New Girl	Brandon	Episode: "No Girl"
2016	Man Seeking Woman	Jesus	Episode: "Honey"
2016	Blunt Talk	Dr. Larry Simon	Episode: "Love Is Not Linear"
2016–2020	Unbreakable Kimmy Schmidt	Robert Durst	5 episodes (seasons 2–4)
2017	Michael Bolton's Big, Sexy Valentine's Day Special	Peter Salanz	Variety special
2017	Son of Zorn	Lord Vulchazor	Voice; episode: "All Hail Son of Zorn"
2017	Animals.	Alabaster	Voice; 2 episodes
2017	Comrade Detective	Orzan	Voice; episode: "Two Films for One Ticket"
2017	Lady Dynamite	Miss Cookie Wolf	Episode: "Apache Justice"
2017	A Christmas Story Live!	Mall Elf	Television special
2017–2018	Nature Cat	Herbert the Hermit Crab	Voice; 7 episodes (seasons 1–2)
2017–2018	The Last Man on Earth	Karl Cowperthwaite	4 episodes (season 4)
2017–2018	I Love You, America with Sarah Silverman	Jesus	2 episodes
2017–2025	Big Mouth	Elliot Birch / various	Voice; main role (81 episodes)
2018–2021	Final Space	KVN	Voice; main role (36 episodes)
2018	Splitting Up Together	Dr. Rydakto	Episode: "Letting Ghost"
2018	Forever	Oscar Hoffman	8 episodes Main role; also executive producer
2018	Fortune Rookie	Fred	2 episodes
2019	Crazy Ex-Girlfriend	Itchy Cat	Episode: "I Need Some Balance"
2019	At Home with Amy Sedaris	Maximiliano	Episode: "Hospital-tality"
2019	Superstore	Kyle Sawyer	Episode: "Toy Drive"
2019	The Kacey Musgraves Christmas Show	Himself	Amazon Prime special
2019–2022	Los Espookys	Tico	12 episodes Main role; also co-creator, writer and executive producer
2020	Harvey Girls Forever!	Stretch	Voice, episode: "Harvey Endings"
2020	Curb Your Enthusiasm	Wally	Episode: "The Surprise Party"
2020	Miracle Workers	Percival Forthwind	Episode: "Music Festival"
2020	Central Park	Zoom Abramovich / Esposito	Voice; 2 episodes (season 1)
2020	Elena of Avalor	Yolo the Animal Shade	Voice; episode: "Coronation Day"
2020	Mapleworth Murders	Brody BcBillan / Belk BcBillan	2 episodes
2020	Moonbase 8	Dr. Michael "Skip" Henai	6 episodes Main role; also writer and executive producer
2020	Sarah Cooper: Everything's Fine	Scooter	Television special
2021	Shrill	Bongo	2 episodes (season 3)
2021	Bless the Harts	Leslie	Voice, episode: "Tiny Pies"
2021	Schmigadoon!	Reverend Howard Layton	Main role; 6 episodes (season 1)
2021	Centaurworld	Splendib / Malandrew / various	Voice; 7 episodes Guest (season 1) Recurring role (season 2)
2022	Toast of Tinseltown	Russ Nightlife	Main role; 6 episodes (series 4)
2022	This Fool	Richard Rowell	Episode: "F*ck the Rich"
2022	Our Flag Means Death	Geraldo	Recurring role; 3 episodes (season 1)
2022	The Kids in the Hall	Michael	Episode 6 (season 6)
2022	What We Do in the Shadows	Doctor DJ Tom Schmidt	Episode: "The Grand Opening"
2022–present	Wednesday	Uncle Fester	4 episodes
2023	Unstable	Leslie	5 episodes
2023	History of the World, Part II	Glorp	1 episode
2023	Agent Elvis	Charles Manson	Episode: "Full Tilt"
2023	Barry	Nestor	Episode: "you're charming"
2024	Fallout	DJ Carl	Episode: "The Radio"
2024	Last Week Tonight with John Oliver	Sweet potato	Voice, episode: "Medicaid"
2024	John Mulaney Presents: Everybody's in LA	Himself	Episode: "Helicopters"
2024	Universal Basic Guys	David Jinglebells	Voice, main role
2025	Digman!	Sigmund Freud	Voice, episode: "Freud’s Couch"
2025	Tales of the Teenage Mutant Ninja Turtles	Scratch	Voice, 3 episodes
2026	Deli Boys	Max Sugar	Main role
TBA	Rhona Who Lives by the River	Mr. Kortle	Upcoming series

== Theatre ==
Year	Title	Role	Venue	Ref.
2008	Untitled Paul Thomas Anderson stage play	Various	Largo at the Coronet	
2016	Oh, Hello on Broadway	Guest	Lyceum Theatre, Broadway	
2024	All In: Comedy About Love	Performer	Hudson Theater, Broadway	

== Video games ==
Year	Title	Role
2008	Grand Theft Auto IV	Pervert, Hotdog Vendor, Internet Nerd
2010	Red Dead Redemption	Pharmacist
2013	The Smurfs 2	Brainy Smurf
2013	Grand Theft Auto V	Hugh Harrison
2014	Scooby Doo and Looney Tunes: Cartoon Universe	Speedy Gonzales
2018	Red Dead Redemption 2	Aldridge T. Abbington
2022	Final Space: The Rescue	STVN
