= Baskets (TV series) =

American television comedy series

- Promotional poster
- Genre: Black comedy; Comedy drama; Surreal humour
- Created by: Louis C.K.; Zach Galifianakis; Jonathan Krisel
- Directed by: Jonathan Krisel
- Starring: Zach Galifianakis; Martha Kelly; Louie Anderson
- Composers: Andrew Bird (season 1); Joshua Moshier (seasons 2–4)
- Country of origin: United States
- Original language: English
- No. of seasons: 4
- No. of episodes: 40

Production
- Executive producers: Louis C.K. (seasons 1–2); Zach Galifianakis; Jonathan Krisel; M. Blair Breard; Dave Becky; Marc Gurvitz; Andrea Pett-Joseph
- Production location: Los Angeles
- Camera setup: Single-camera
- Running time: 21–25 minutes
- Production companies: Pig Newton, Inc. (seasons 1–2); Billios; 3 Arts Entertainment (seasons 1–2); Brillstein Entertainment Partners; FXP

Original release
- Network: FX
- Release: January 21, 2016 – August 22, 2019

Baskets is an American comedy drama television series that premiered on FX on January 21, 2016. The series was co-created by Louis C.K., Zach Galifianakis, and Jonathan Krisel; Krisel is also the showrunner and director. Galifianakis stars in the dual lead role as Chip Baskets, a failed professional clown in Paris, who instead becomes a local rodeo clown in Bakersfield, California, and his twin brother, Dale Baskets. Galifianakis, C.K., M. Blair Breard, Dave Becky, Marc Gurvitz and Andrea Pett-Joseph serve as executive producers, with FX Productions as the production company. In 2017, C.K.'s production company Pig Newton had all ties to the show and FX cut after C.K. admitted to sexual misconduct with five women. On May 24, 2018, FX renewed the show for a fourth and final season, which premiered on June 13, 2019. The series ended on August 22, 2019.

== Premise ==
Chip Baskets aims to become a professional clown. After failing to get a degree at a prestigious clowning school in Paris, he is stuck with a job as a rodeo clown in his hometown of Bakersfield, California.

== Cast ==
=== Main cast ===
- Zach Galifianakis as
  - Chip Baskets, a classically trained clown who is forced to return to his hometown of Bakersfield, California to become a rodeo clown.
  - Dale Everett Baskets, Chip's twin brother and the dean and founder of a local vocational college. He is a married father of two.
- Martha Kelly as Martha Brooks, Chip's low-key auto insurance agent at Costco. Despite his angry and rude treatment of her, she is Chip's closest friend.
- Louie Anderson as Christine Baskets, mother of Chip and Dale, as well as two adopted twins, Cody and Logan.

=== Recurring cast ===
- Sabina Sciubba as Penelope (seasons 1–2, 4), Chip's French wife. She only married Chip to get a green card so that she could further her singing career in the United States.
- Ernest Adams as Eddie, the owner and manager of the Buckaroo Rodeo.
- Garry and Jason Clemmons as Cody and Logan Baskets (seasons 1–2, 4), Christine's adopted sons who are also twins.
- Ellen D. Williams as Nicole Baskets, Dale's wife.
- Malia Pyles as Sarah Baskets, Dale's elder daughter.
- Julia Rose Gruenberg as Crystal Baskets, Dale's younger daughter.
- Ivy Jones as Grandma (seasons 1–2), Christine's mother and Chip and Dale's grandmother.
- Adam Zastrow (season 1) and Tommy Snider (seasons 2–4) as Jode, a juggalo and Arby's manager.
- Maree Cheatham as Maggie, Christine's friend.
- Alex Morris as Ken (seasons 2–4), a Denver-based carpet supply company owner and Christine's new boyfriend.
- Mary Wiseman as Trinity (seasons 2–4), a busking clown who Chip helps get a job at Arby's.
- Peter Jason as Jim (seasons 2–4), Chip and Dale's uncle and Christine's brother.
- Ryun Yu as Daniel (seasons 3–4), a reverend.
- Andrea Marcovicci as Tammy Nielman Zemonski (season 4), a life coach.
- Anna Konkle as Anita (season 4), a realtor.

== Production ==
In December 2013, Louis C.K.'s production company, Pig Newton, signed a deal with FX for him to create new shows for their various networks. FX ordered a pilot episode for Baskets with C.K. and Galifianakis to co-write, and Galifianakis to star. On August 27, 2014, FX picked up the show for a 10-episode first season with production to commence in 2015.

In November 2017, after Louis C.K. confirmed the sexual misconduct allegations against him were true, FX canceled their overall deal with C.K. and his production company, Pig Newton. C.K. would have no involvement in future seasons of the series.

Baskets incorporated several ideas Galifianakis originally came up with for Between Two Ferns: The Movie but were discarded early in the film's development. Galifianakis stated master clown Philippe Gaulier and his clown school École Philippe Gaulier in France were an inspiration for the show.

== Episodes ==
=== Series overview ===
Season	Episodes	Originally released	
Season	Episodes	First released	Last released
1	10	January 21, 2016	March 24, 2016
2	10	January 19, 2017	March 23, 2017
3	10	January 23, 2018	March 27, 2018
4	10	June 13, 2019	August 22, 2019

=== Season 1 (2016) ===
No. overall	No. in season	Title	Directed by	Written by	Original release date	Prod. code	U.S. viewers (millions)
1	1	"Renoir"	Jonathan Krisel	Louis C.K. & Zach Galifianakis & Jonathan Krisel	January 21, 2016	XBS01001	1.04
Chip Baskets pursues his dreams of being a professional clown but finds as much failure there as he does in his personal and family lives.
2	2	"Trainee"	Jonathan Krisel	Rebecca Drysdale	January 28, 2016	XBS01003	0.658
Chip mentors a Juggalo devotee at the rodeo, while Martha tries to sell a Costco membership so she won't get fired.
3	3	"Strays"	Jonathan Krisel	Graham Wagner	February 4, 2016	XBS01002	0.625
Martha faces a pet problem at home, while Chip meets his wife's lover.
4	4	"Easter in Bakersfield"	Jonathan Krisel	Samuel D. Hunter	February 11, 2016	XBS01004	0.567
The Easter holiday brings more strife, but also some understanding, to the Baskets family.
5	5	"Uncle Dad"	Jonathan Krisel	Samuel D. Hunter	February 18, 2016	XBS01005	0.649
While Chip and Martha spend an eye-opening day watching Dale's kids, Christine finally meets Penelope.
6	6	"DJ Twins"	Jonathan Krisel	Jonathan Krisel	February 25, 2016	XBS01006	0.483
Chip's potential big break comes as Cody and Logan, Christine's favored second set of twins bring their DJ act to Bakersfield.
7	7	"Cowboys"	Jonathan Krisel	Graham Wagner	March 3, 2016	XBS01007	0.399
Rodeo boss Eddie enlists Chip and Martha to join him on a road trip that could end in violence.
8	8	"Sugar Pie"	Jonathan Krisel	Jonathan Krisel	March 10, 2016	XBS01008	0.396
Christine Baskets suffers a serious health crisis that affects her sons in different ways.
9	9	"Picnic"	Jonathan Krisel	Rebecca Drysdale	March 17, 2016	XBS01009	0.500
Chip reminisces about happier times in Paris with Penelope, as Christine takes a turn for the worse.
10	10	"Family Portrait"	Jonathan Krisel	Jonathan Krisel	March 24, 2016	XBS01010	0.564
A perceived betrayal by Dale, further rejection by Penelope, and the closing of the rodeo cause Chip's life to unravel completely.

=== Season 2 (2017) ===
No. overall	No. in season	Title	Directed by	Written by	Original release date	Prod. code	U.S. viewers (millions)
11	1	"Freaks"	Jonathan Krisel	Jonathan Krisel	January 19, 2017	XBS02001	0.656
Chip continues the hobo life by cashlessly riding the rails (and being violently ejected from them) before he falls in with a homeless clown troupe where he enjoys performing and having companions but is disturbed by other aspects of their lifestyle.
12	2	"Reverie"	Jonathan Krisel	Graham Wagner	January 26, 2017	XBS02002	0.518
As Chip continues to reluctantly stick with the hobo clowns, he flashes back to his rodeo days and some surprising good and bad times, until troupe-leader Morpheus' shocking death leads to his arrest and a route back to his old life.
13	3	"Bail"	Jonathan Krisel	Samuel D. Hunter	February 2, 2017	XBS02003	0.362
Christine ponders motherhood and her path to a healthy life when she goes to bail Chip out of jail. Back in Bakersfield, Dale seeks romance and completely fails.
14	4	"Ronald Reagan Library"	Jonathan Krisel	Samuel D. Hunter	February 9, 2017	XBS02004	0.515
Christine and her new friend Ken visit the Reagan Library and reflect on their shared parenting experiences and differing political views, while Chip undertakes a mission to properly say goodbye to his late friend Morpheus.
15	5	"Fight"	Jonathan Krisel	Graham Wagner	February 16, 2017	XBS02005	0.463
Christine leaves Dale and Chip at home for a shopping trip to Costco and a nice lunch with Martha. Her sons end up in an escalating battle that includes destroyed property and a mission to rescue Christine's cat that ends up being a cause for catharsis.
16	6	"Marthager"	Jonathan Krisel	Karen Kilgariff & Graham Wagner	February 23, 2017	XBS02006	0.460
An angry Christine throws Chip and Dale out of the house they badly damaged, and spends some surprisingly useful time with her aging mother. Chip enlists Martha to become his manager, but after a more established clown-for-hire service gets him real work and fires her, he admits that Martha is a true friend to him.
17	7	"Denver"	Jonathan Krisel	Samuel D. Hunter	March 2, 2017	XBS02007	0.500
Christine travels to Denver and spends the day with her friend, Ken, and his family. Chip, with Martha's help, tries to take Meemaw to the doctor, but has an eventful day at the casino with a shocking ending.
18	8	"Funeral"	Jonathan Krisel	Jonathan Krisel & Rachele Lynn	March 9, 2017	XBS02008	0.517
The family comes together to say goodbye to a loved one. Christine has an honest conversation with her dishonest brother about their childhood and the emotional and physical abuse she suffered at the hands of their long-deceased alcoholic father. Chip and Dale help Cody and Logan reconcile and a surprising assist from Penelope lands the DJ Twins new work.
19	9	"Yard Sale"	Jonathan Krisel	Jonathan Krisel	March 16, 2017	XBS02009	0.391
Martha is left to handle a yard sale of Meemaw's old items, as the Baskets family tends to several situations: Chip's effort to help his former hobo-clown friend Trinity, Dale helping Sarah get out of a crisis and facing bad news at work, and Christine once again giving her selfish brother Jim a dose of reality.
20	10	"Circus"	Jonathan Krisel	Jonathan Krisel	March 23, 2017	XBS02010	0.442
Christine ponders how to help her family post-inheritance while Ken comes to visit her and Chip sees a great opportunity at a Russian traveling circus turn into another bitter disappointment, before Christine joins Chip, Dale and herself in a new venture.

=== Season 3 (2018) ===
No. overall	No. in season	Title	Directed by	Written by	Original release date	Prod. code	U.S. viewers (millions)
21	1	"Wild Horses"	Jonathan Krisel	Jonathan Krisel	January 23, 2018	XBS03001	0.536
The rodeo business starts back up, but the fundamentals of it are tough for the family to pick up, and Christine is nervous about a TV interview.
22	2	"Finding Eddie"	Jonathan Krisel	Karen Kilgariff	January 30, 2018	XBS03002	0.530
Chip's quest for finding clowns to work at the rodeo leads into a bizarre journey for himself and Martha to find and bring back his old rodeo boss Eddie.
23	3	"Crash"	Jonathan Krisel	Danica Radovanov & Jonathan Krisel	February 6, 2018	XBS03003	0.386
Chip has to help out when his old friend Juggalo Jody has a crisis with his girlfriend Trinity, while Christine navigates the chaos that Eddie brings with him to Bakersfield.
24	4	"A Night at the Opera"	Jonathan Krisel	Theresa Mulligan Rosenthal	February 13, 2018	XBS03004	0.389
Christine plans an outrageously extravagant opera-themed gala event at the rodeo to impress her increasingly unkind circle of "friends" but it ends up alienating her from both Chip and Dale.
25	5	"Sweat Equity"	Jonathan Krisel	John Levenstein	February 20, 2018	XBS03005	0.375
Dale calls in Christine's unpleasant brother Jim to "help" with the rodeo situation, and his reaction to his estranged wife's boyfriend makes him even angrier at his mom.
26	6	"Thanksgiving"	Jonathan Krisel	Jonathan Krisel	February 27, 2018	XBS03006	0.353
Christine's Thanksgiving is initially sad and lonely, until surprising visitors save the day, while Chip learns a sad truth about Martha's family.
27	7	"Women's Conference"	Jonathan Krisel	Theresa Mulligan Rosenthal	March 6, 2018	XBS03007	0.345
Christine coerces Martha into attending a Women's conference in Las Vegas. There she briefly meets Lori Greiner, a seminar speaker, and gets a hard lesson from Martha about listening and not just talking. Ken visits Bakersfield in Christine's absence and tries to persuade Dale to be more reasonable with Christine with some help from Chip.
28	8	"Commercial"	Jonathan Krisel	Karen Kilgariff	March 13, 2018	XBS03008	0.414
Christine announces that they'll make a TV commercial for the rodeo but Dale (who has experience making lame ads for Baskets Career College) returns to his usual pissy self when Christine says that Ken will run the project due to his own TV experience. The filming doesn't go well with mistakes and Ken ultimately tires of Dale's disrespect and ridicule of Christine and slaps him, sending Dale into hysterics. Dale loses his mind and announces he's leaving town, and Ken and Christine have a tense farewell that leaves their relationship in doubt, before Christine finishes the TV commercial herself.
29	9	"Basque-ets"	Jonathan Krisel	Samuel D. Hunter	March 20, 2018	XBS03009	0.437
Chip wants to try out a new clown character and give Martha the birthday celebration she didn't want, Martha's romantic story hits several roadblocks, Ken comes back to fix things with Christine, and Dale shows up and proclaims he's gotten engaged.
30	10	"New Year's Eve"	Jonathan Krisel	Samuel D. Hunter	March 27, 2018	XBS03010	0.307
Ken and his daughters rent what seems to be a crummy cabin for a New Year's Eve celebration. Dale's lies destroy his engagement after he makes it clear he won't support Ken's plan to propose to Christine, but some reality and rare humility improve the situation. At a nicer location, Chip is surprised by a phone call from Penelope, and Ken has something he wants to ask Christine.

=== Season 4 (2019) ===
No. overall	No. in season	Title	Directed by	Written by	Original release date	Prod. code	U.S. viewers (millions)
31	1	"Cat People"	Jonathan Krisel	Jonathan Krisel	June 13, 2019	XBS04001	0.317
As Penelope arrives in Los Angeles to record her album, Chip contemplates living independently of Christine and Ken.
32	2	"Baby Chip"	Jonathan Krisel	Danica Radovanov	June 20, 2019	XBS04002	0.298
Chip's new living arrangement proves to be untenable, but he perseveres in finding a place of his own, with guidance from Martha's life coach.
33	3	"Homemakers"	Jonathan Krisel	Samuel D. Hunter	June 27, 2019	XBS04003	0.337
At a retreat hosted by Martha's life coach Tammy, Chip monopolizes Tammy's attention, to the great frustration of Martha. Tammy encourages Chip to let go of the fear of becoming his father, and embrace growing up. Christine struggles to make her new house feel like home.
34	4	"Affirmations"	Jonathan Krisel	L.T. Verrastro	July 11, 2019	XBS04004	0.332
Chip begins to internalize Tammy's teachings, even as Christine continues to be an overbearing figure in his life. Dale's overprotectiveness of his daughter hinders his attempts at bonding with her. Family tensions reach a boiling point during dinner.
35	5	"Denver Revisited"	Jonathan Krisel	Samuel D. Hunter	July 18, 2019	XBS04005	0.370
Christine travels to Denver with Ken, where she realizes Ken's connection to Denver remains stronger than she thought. As the new CEO of the rodeo, Chip enlists Dale to help beef up security after some break-ins, which leads to an accident.
36	6	"Common Room Wake"	Jonathan Krisel	John Levenstein	July 25, 2019	XBS04006	0.349
Chip offers to host the wake for Martha's recently deceased father, taking an opportunity to channel his passion for grief clowning.
37	7	"Housewarming"	Jonathan Krisel	Theresa Mulligan Rosenthal	August 1, 2019	XBS04007	0.317
Chip's foray into professional grief clowning at a local hospital starts on a difficult note. Being delayed in Denver, Ken can no longer attend his own wedding to Christine, so she turns the wedding into a housewarming party, masking her disappointment. Ultimately, Ken returns to Bakersfield and marries Christine later that night.
38	8	"Grandma's Day"	Jonathan Krisel	Karen Kilgariff	August 8, 2019	XBS04008	0.330
Christine's granddaughter interviews her for a school assignment, which turns into a sightseeing tour of Bakersfield. The state of California notifies Chip about seizing the rodeo to make way for a high-speed rail project, so after reaching out to Tammy for additional guidance, Chip decides to fight against the state's plans.
39	9	"Mrs. Baskets Goes to Sacramento"	Jonathan Krisel	Carrie Kemper	August 15, 2019	XBS04009	0.320
The Baskets family makes a trip to Sacramento to protest against the bullet train, but when the time comes for Christine to make her case before the state senate, her feelings suddenly change. Panicked about his uncertain future, Chip seeks Tammy's help once more.
40	10	"Moving On"	Jonathan Krisel	Jonathan Krisel	August 22, 2019	XBS04010	0.296
Chip's dependence on Tammy's coaching becomes unhealthy, causing Martha to take a drastic measure. Chip's relationship with his mother finally turns a corner, as he confronts her about charting his own future as an adult, uncertain as it may be. Chip and Dale say goodbye to Christine and Ken, as the newlyweds leave to be together in Denver.

== Reception ==
Baskets has received positive reviews from critics. Rotten Tomatoes gives the first season 70% with an average score of 7.4 out of 10, based on 36 reviews. The site's consensus reads, "Though its themes may be unpleasant for some and LOL moments are few and far between, Baskets succeeds on the strength of its deadpan delivery and terrific cast." On Metacritic, the first season holds a score of 68 out of 100, based on 32 reviews, indicating "generally favorable reviews".

=== Accolades ===
Year	Award	Category	Nominee(s)	Result
2016	Critics' Choice Television Awards	Best Supporting Actor in a Comedy Series	Louie Anderson	Won
2016	Primetime Emmy Awards	Outstanding Supporting Actor in a Comedy Series	Louie Anderson	Won
2017	Primetime Emmy Awards	Outstanding Lead Actor in a Comedy Series	Zach Galifianakis	Nominated
2017	Primetime Emmy Awards	Outstanding Supporting Actor in a Comedy Series	Louie Anderson	Nominated
2018	Satellite Awards	Best Musical or Comedy Series	Baskets	Nominated
2018	Satellite Awards	Best Actor in a Musical or Comedy Series	Zach Galifianakis	Nominated
2018	Satellite Awards	Best Supporting Actor in a Series, Miniseries or TV Film	Louie Anderson	Nominated
2018	Primetime Emmy Awards	Outstanding Supporting Actor in a Comedy Series	Louie Anderson	Nominated

== Broadcast ==
Internationally, the series premiered in Australia on January 26, 2016. It aired in the UK on Fox from April 13, 2017.
