= Kristine Levine =

American comedian, actor, and author (born 1970)

- Born: August 17, 1970 (age 56); Oregon
- Other name: Mamu

Comedy career
- Years active: 1999–present
- Medium: Stand-up, television
- Genres: Black comedy, Blue comedy, Insult comedy, Observational comedy
- Subjects: American culture, Current events, Recreational drug use, Human sexuality, Religion, Family, Libertarianism, Motherhood

Kristine Levine (born August 17, 1970) is an American comedian, actor, and author best known for performing in the sketch comedy television series Portlandia.

== Filmography ==
=== Film ===
- The Unbookables (2012, as self)
- Welcome to Bridgetown (2015, as self)

=== Television ===
- Portlandia (2011–2016, 10 episodes)

== Stage performances ==
- Fat Whore (2012)
- Critical Comedy (2017)
