= Ghosted (TV series) =

American supernatural sitcom (2017–2018)

- Genre: Comedy; Horror; Science fiction
- Created by: Tom Gormican
- Starring: Adam Scott; Craig Robinson; Ally Walker; Adeel Akhtar; Amber Stevens West
- Composer: Clay Layton
- Country of origin: United States
- Original language: English
- No. of seasons: 1
- No. of episodes: 16

Production
- Executive producers: Craig Robinson; Adam Scott; Naomi Scott; Mark Schulman; Oly Obst; Jonathan Krisel; Paul Lieberstein
- Camera setup: Single-camera
- Running time: 22 minutes
- Production companies: Crowley Etten Productions (Pilot) (Note: Credited as Kevin Etten on the Twitter preview); Afternoonnap (Episode 2-); Additional Dialogue; TYPO, Inc.; Gettin' Rad Productions; 3 Arts Entertainment; 20th Century Fox Television

Original release
- Network: Fox
- Release: October 1, 2017 – July 22, 2018

Ghosted is an American supernatural sitcom that premiered on Fox on October 1, 2017. The series debuted via streaming on the social media website Twitter on September 21 and 24, 2017. The show stars Craig Robinson and Adam Scott as two polar opposites recruited to investigate paranormal activity in Los Angeles. On November 29, 2017, it was announced that Fox had ordered six more episodes, for a total of sixteen. On June 28, 2018, Fox canceled the series after one season.

== Plot ==
The series follows a sharp-witted skeptic and a genius true believer in the paranormal who are recruited by an organization called The Bureau Underground to investigate a series of "unexplained" activities that are occurring in the Los Angeles area, which are supposedly tied to a mysterious entity that could threaten the existence of the human species. The second part of the season then focuses on conspiracy theories following Leroy and Max finding the Bureau Underground is bugged and questioning whether paranormal activities actually exist.

== Cast and characters ==
=== Main ===
- Craig Robinson as Leroy Wright, a mall cop and former police detective who was fired from the LAPD after his partner was killed during a call. He has a nephew he is close to.
- Adam Scott as Max Jennifer, a book store employee and former Stanford professor. He wrote a book on the multiverse. His wife was abducted by aliens, and he was fired from Stanford University when no one believed him.
- Ally Walker as Captain Ava Lafrey, the captain of the Bureau.
- Adeel Akhtar as Barry Shaw, a scientist at the Bureau.
- Amber Stevens West as Annie Carver, a technological employee at the Bureau.

=== Recurring ===
- Kevin Dunn as Merv Minette, the new Captain of The Bureau Underground.
- Britt Lower as Claire Jennifer, Max's wife.

=== Guests ===
- Dax Shepard as Sam, an AI system.
- Beck Bennett as Bob, a friendly Bureau employee.
- Sam McMurray as Campbell McMasters, a wealthy country club member.
- Mo Collins as Monica Yates, a trophy wife of a wealthy country club member.
- John Getz as Romsio, the director of the Bureau Underground and Lafrey's boss.

== Production ==
Ghosted was created and executive produced by Tom Gormican (who also serves as writer) with Craig Robinson and Adam Scott (who also star in the lead roles), Naomi Scott, Mark Schuman, Oly Obst, Kevin Etten, and director Jonathan Krisel. On August 30, 2016, Fox commissioned a production commitment for the pilot. On May 10, 2017, Fox ordered the pilot to series. On November 29, 2017, it was announced that Fox had ordered 6 additional episodes, bringing its first season total to 16. It was also announced that Kevin Etten was being replaced as showrunner by Paul Lieberstein which focused on retooling the second part of the first season into more of an office setting rather than a paranormal show. The series was canceled after one season in June 2018.

=== Filming ===
Ghosted is a single-camera series produced by Gettin' Rad Productions, 3 Arts Entertainment, and 20th Century Fox Television.

=== Casting ===
On August 30, 2016, Fox cast Craig Robinson as Leroy Wright and Adam Scott as Max Jennifer. Edi Patterson was cast as Delilah on February 14, 2017. On March 1, 2017, Ally Walker was cast as Captain Lafrey. Adeel Akhtar was cast as Barry on March 9, 2017. On July 12, Amber Stevens West was cast as Annie, who was played by Edi Patterson in the pilot.

== Broadcast ==
The series began to air on Fox's sister network FXX in the weeks following the premiere. In the United Kingdom, it began airing on ITV2 on October 30, 2017. In Latin America, it broadcast the 16 episodes from June to July 2018 on FX.

== Episodes ==
No.	Title	Directed by	Written by	Original release date	Prod. code	U.S. viewers (millions)
1	"Pilot"	Jonathan Krisel	Story by : Tom Gormican; Teleplay by : Tom Gormican & Kevin Etten	October 1, 2017 (Note: The pilot episode received an early release on September 21, 2017.)	1LAL01	3.58
After an agent from the Bureau Underground is captured, the Bureau takes his advice to recruit Max and Leroy. The unlikely duo go on a mission to save the agent and fight his abductor, an alien-possessed man. However, the alien escapes with the agent onto a UFO. Max and Leroy decide to stay with the Underground Bureau to find out more. In the end, Max's wife Claire is revealed to be in the Bureau's custody after being possessed by an extraterrestrial.
2	"Bee-Mo"	Lynn Shelton	Blake McCormick	October 8, 2017	1LAL04	3.58
Leroy takes Jermaine (his former police partner's son) trick-or-treating, and Max tags along. However, Jermaine reveals he is only interested in going to a party against his mother's wishes. Meanwhile, a cat infects Jermaine with a virus, which turns Jermaine and the party-goers into zombies.
3	"Whispers"	Dean Holland	Sally Bradford McKenna	October 15, 2017	1LAL03	2.41
Leroy and Max investigate a murder in which a body has been found with its heart removed. Max urges Leroy to go on a date with a female police officer (Megalyn Echikunwoke) who turns out to be a succubus who is responsible for the recent death. Meanwhile, Captain Lafrey is suspicious of her teenage daughter and enlists Barry and Annie to spy on her. After the succubus attacks Leroy, Max kicks her off of a hotel room balcony and she vanishes. The team loses track of Lafrey's daughter, who later appears in Lafrey's office having been aware of and annoyed by the spying. Max is able to meet with Claire at a mental hospital, but she knocks him out and escapes.
4	"Lockdown"	Rob Schrab	Sean Clements	October 22, 2017	1LAL05	2.71
An amphibious monster is inadvertently brought back to life inside of the Bureau by coroner Bob (Beck Bennett). The monster kills Bob, initiating a lockdown and a 30-minute self-destruct sequence. A water delivery man, Jace (Ryan McPartlin), is also trapped inside the building. The monster kills another worker (Erik Griffin), but Max and Leroy are able to kill the monster by covering themselves in baby powder, stopping the self-destruct sequence just in time.
5	"The Machine"	Kyle Newacheck	Leila Strachan	November 5, 2017	1LAL07	2.33
Max and Leroy go undercover at a country club to investigate the death of a golf caddy who mysteriously aged rapidly. Guests: Sam McMurray, Harry Groener, Ali Ghandour and Mo Collins
6	"Sam"	Jamie Babbit	Ryan Ridley	November 12, 2017	1LAL06	3.25
While acting as Bureau Director, Annie installs an Artificial Intelligence software to manage the office. Max grows suspicious that the program might be evil and want access to the Bureau's personal files. Meanwhile, Leroy makes a new friend which causes Max to be jealous. Guests: Dax Shepard and Sonya Walger
7	"Ghost Studz"	Michael Patrick Jann	Sarah Peters	November 19, 2017	1LAL08	1.94
Max and Leroy go undercover as film crew as the hosts of a paranormal reality show actually stumble upon real paranormal activity and go missing.
8	"Haunted Hayride"	Rob Schrab	Kevin Etten & Tom Gormican	December 3, 2017	1LAL02	2.61
The bureau investigates the disappearance and reappearance of a young girl who was dragged by an unseen force at a "haunted" hayride questioning it if it was real or a publicity stunt.
9	"Snatcher"	Jennifer Arnold	Blake McCormick	January 7, 2018	1LAL09	3.89
Max and Leroy invite Annie to tag along on their next case because she is an expert in the killer creature they are trying to find.
10	"The Wire"	Jeffrey Blitz	Paul Lieberstein	June 10, 2018	1LAL11	1.21
Leroy Wright becomes disillusioned with the Bureau after there has been no case of paranormal/monster of the week for months and questions why he is still working for the Bureau. To fuel his boredom he sells hangers to a mysterious customer. Meanwhile Max Jennifer finds a bug in The Bureau Underground.
11	"The Demotion"	Jennifer Arnold	Adam Barr	June 10, 2018	1LAL12	1.13
After finding the bug, Captain Ava Lafrey is demoted and Merv Minette (Kevin Dunn) is the new Captain of The Bureau Underground.
12	"The Premonition"	Jay Karas	Rebecca Addelman	June 17, 2018	1LAL13	1.39
Leroy Wright brings in a psychic who helps him to figure out who bugged the office. The psychic tells the staff one person will die after leaving the office. Only Max is unwilling to believe the psychic.
13	"The Article"	Jude Weng	Leo Allen	June 24, 2018	1LAL14	1.13
An article in the Times about the Bureau Underground breaks news around the world. Max's mother and father ask him to quit and go work for his brother selling power bars. Leroy is ordered by Minette to interrogate his co-workers to find out who leaked the information to the Times. Ava, using info about who bugged the Bureau Underground, goes looking for answers, coming face to face with danger.
14	"Unbelievable"	Claire Scanlon	Charla Lauriston	July 8, 2018	1LAL15	1.00
Max and Leroy spot a possible UFO. However, as they are watching it Leroy drops a bombshell about Annie that steals the show.
15	"The Airplane"	Matt Sohn	Andy Blitz	July 15, 2018	1LAL16	1.32
The Bureau Underground struggles to be taken seriously while forced to share a case both with the FBI and the FAA. Disheartened by the lack of respect, the team turns to Merv (guest star Kevin Dunn) who offers very little support. Meanwhile, an unlikely relationship forms and Max makes a shocking discovery. Season and series finale.
16	"Hello Boys"	Wendey Stanzler	Ryan Ridley	April 16, 2018 (NZ); July 22, 2018 (US) (Note: Originally intended to be broadcast on January 14, 2018 as the winter finale; was streamed on Amazon.)	1LAL10	1.13
While trying to prove their worth to Captain Lafrey and the rest of The Bureau Underground, Leroy and Max finally have a lead on the whereabouts of Agent Checker (guest star Linc Hand). Leroy finds himself in the odd position of being the believer when Max loses faith in their competency.

== Reception ==
=== Ratings ===
Viewership and ratings per episode of Ghosted
No.	Title	Air date	Rating/share (18–49)	Viewers (millions)	DVR (18–49)	DVR viewers (millions)	Total (18–49)	Total viewers (millions)
1	"Pilot"	October 1, 2017	1.4/5	3.58	TBD	1.73	TBD	5.32
2	"Bee-Mo"	October 8, 2017	1.4/5	3.58	TBD	TBD	TBD	TBD
3	"Whispers"	October 15, 2017	1.0/4	2.41	TBD	TBD	TBD	TBD
4	"Lockdown"	October 22, 2017	1.1/3	2.71	TBD	TBD	TBD	TBD
5	"The Machine"	November 5, 2017	1.0/4	2.33	TBD	TBD	TBD	TBD
6	"Sam"	November 12, 2017	1.3/4	3.25	TBD	TBD	TBD	TBD
7	"Ghost Studz"	November 19, 2017	0.8/3	1.94	TBD	TBD	TBD	TBD
8	"Haunted Hayride"	December 3, 2017	1.0/4	2.61	TBD	TBD	TBD	TBD
9	"Snatcher"	January 7, 2018	1.6/6	3.89	TBD	TBD	TBD	TBD
10	"The Wire"	June 10, 2018	0.4/2	1.21	0.2	0.47	0.6	1.68
11	"The Demotion"	June 10, 2018	0.4/2	1.13	0.2	0.48	0.6	1.61
12	"The Premonition"	June 17, 2018	0.5/2	1.39	TBD	TBD	TBD	TBD
13	"The Article"	June 24, 2018	0.4/2	1.13	TBD	TBD	TBD	TBD
14	"Unbelievable"	July 8, 2018	0.4/2	1.00	TBD	TBD	TBD	TBD
15	"The Airplane"	July 15, 2018	0.5/2	1.32	TBD	TBD	TBD	TBD
16	"Hello Boys"	July 22, 2018	0.4/2	1.13	TBD	TBD	TBD	TBD

=== Critical reviews ===
Ghosted received mixed to positive reviews. The review aggregator website Rotten Tomatoes reported a 59% approval rating based on 27 reviews, with an average rating of 5.92/10. The website's critical consensus reads "Craig Robinson and Adam Scott's odd-couple chemistry is strong enough to carry Ghosted through a first season that finds the show a promising work in progress."
