= Alice Mathias =

American television director and producer

- Born: 1985 (age 40–41); Chicago, Illinois, U.S.
- Education: Dartmouth College; USC School of Cinematic Arts (MFA)
- Occupations: Television director; television producer
- Years active: 2011–present
- Notable work: Portlandia; I Think You Should Leave with Tim Robinson; Los Espookys

Alice Mathias is an American television director and producer from Chicago.

== Early life and education ==
Mathias grew up in the Old Town neighborhood of Chicago. In high school, she performed in musicals and dabbled in improv. She attended Dartmouth College, where she wrote a humor column called "Alice Unchained" for The Dartmouth. She later earned an MFA from the USC School of Cinematic Arts.

== Career ==
=== Television ===
Mathias joined the IFC sketch comedy series Portlandia as an intern during its first season and rose to become the show's executive producer and director. As a producer on Portlandia, she received four Primetime Emmy Award nominations for Outstanding Variety Sketch Series.

She also served as a producer on Documentary Now!, receiving two additional Emmy nominations for Outstanding Variety Sketch Series.

Mathias is an executive producer and director of the Netflix sketch comedy series I Think You Should Leave with Tim Robinson, which she has described as "absurdist and unhinged". The show was nominated for the Primetime Emmy Award for Outstanding Short Form Comedy, Drama or Variety Series in 2022 and won the award in 2023. An episode she directed, "Has This Ever Happened to You?", was named one of the best TV episodes of 2019 by IndieWire.

Mathias was an executive producer on the HBO Spanish-language comedy Los Espookys, which ran for two seasons (2019–2022). The series won a Peabody Award in 2023.

Her other directing credits include History of the World, Part II, Schmigadoon!, and That Damn Michael Che.

=== Commercial work ===
Mathias has directed commercials for brands including Apple, Nike, Little Caesars, and Toyota. She is represented for commercial work by Gifted Youth, a production company formerly under Funny or Die. In 2025, she directed Totino's' first Super Bowl commercial, featuring Tim Robinson and Sam Richardson.
