= Moonbase 8 =

American comedy television series

- Genre: Comedy
- Created by: Fred Armisen; Tim Heidecker; Jonathan Krisel; John C. Reilly
- Directed by: Jonathan Krisel
- Starring: John C. Reilly; Tim Heidecker; Fred Armisen
- Composer: Steven Drozd
- Country of origin: United States
- Original language: English
- No. of seasons: 1
- No. of episodes: 6

Production
- Executive producers: Fred Armisen; Tim Heidecker; Jonathan Krisel; John C. Reilly; Dave Kneebone
- Cinematography: Carl Herse
- Editors: Micah Gardner; Michael Giambra; Stacy Moon
- Production companies: Antigravico; Interesting Situations; Harlequitten Inc; Top Drawer Entertainment Inc.; Abso Lutely Productions; A24

Original release
- Network: Showtime
- Release: November 8 – December 6, 2020

Moonbase 8 is an American comedy television series created and written by Fred Armisen, Tim Heidecker, Jonathan Krisel and John C. Reilly, starring Armisen, Heidecker and Reilly in the lead roles. It premiered on November 8, 2020, on Showtime.

== Premise ==
Moonbase 8 follows three subpar astronauts in one of several NASA Moon base training simulators located in Winslow, Arizona, hoping to be the crew selected by NASA to travel to the actual Moon Base, whose construction is nearing completion.

== Cast ==
=== Main ===
- John C. Reilly as Robert "Cap" Caputo, a former helicopter tour pilot who claims to be a military veteran
- Tim Heidecker as Professor Scott "Rook" Sloan, a Christian who wants to spread "the Gospel of Jesus Christ out into the universe"
- Fred Armisen as Dr. Michael "Skip" Henai, the son of an astronaut

=== Guest ===
- Travis Kelce as himself, a piece of "stunt casting" by NASA for the astronaut program
- Adam Lambert as Billy
- Thomas Mann as Cooper
- Alia Shawkat as Alix

== Episodes ==
No.	Title	Directed by	Written by	Original release date	U.S. viewers (millions)
1	"Dry"	Jonathan Krisel	Fred Armisen & Tim Heidecker & Jonathan Krisel & John C. Reilly	November 8, 2020	0.090
At the moonbase, Cap is very deferential to Travis Kelce, while Rook and Skip think he is there only for public-relations purposes. When Skip takes inventory of their water, he realizes that they will soon run out. Travis suggests digging a well, which Cap agrees to. While he is digging, Travis falls into the water tank and dies. Cap returns to the moonbase, and they agree to hide Cap's involvement in Travis's death. The three crewmembers insist that their mission should continue.
2	"Rats"	Jonathan Krisel	Fred Armisen & Tim Heidecker & Jonathan Krisel & John C. Reilly	November 15, 2020	0.061
The crew is alarmed when it appears that someone is stealing from their base at night. Rook becomes homesick, and announces his intention to leave Moonbase 8. The crew involves him in catching the thief, and he decides to stay at the base.
3	"Quarantine"	Jonathan Krisel	Fred Armisen & Tim Heidecker & Jonathan Krisel & John C. Reilly	November 22, 2020	0.057
A fourth crew member, Alisha, is added to the team. She tries to encourage efficiency changes, which frustrates Skip. Cap becomes sick, and is forced to quarantine from his crew members. Skip also becomes sick, but Cap refuses to quarantine with him, and opts to create an outdoor sweat lodge. Skip hallucinates visions of himself speaking positively and negatively about how he is working with Alisha. Rook begins developing romantic feelings towards Alisha, but is rebuffed when he offers to kiss her. Skip and Cap recover, but Alisha reveals she is on an upcoming space mission and leaves Moonbase.
4	"Visitors"	Jonathan Krisel	Fred Armisen & Tim Heidecker & Jonathan Krisel & John C. Reilly	November 29, 2020	0.033
5	"Move the Base"	Jonathan Krisel	Fred Armisen & Tim Heidecker & Jonathan Krisel & John C. Reilly	December 6, 2020	0.144
6	"Beef"	Jonathan Krisel	Fred Armisen & Tim Heidecker & Jonathan Krisel & John C. Reilly	December 6, 2020	0.102

== Production ==
=== Development ===
On April 24, 2018, it was announced that A24 had begun production on a comedy television series titled Moonbase 8 that they independently funded. Executive producers include Fred Armisen, Tim Heidecker, Jonathan Krisel, John C. Reilly, and Dave Kneebone. Krisel directed all six episodes. Production companies involved with the production include A24 and Abso Lutely Productions. A24 began shopping the series to networks once production concluded. The series premiered on November 8, 2020, on Showtime. The entire first season became available on-demand to Showtime subscribers on November 8, 2020.

The series is scored by Steven Drozd, best known for his work with The Flaming Lips, his first time scoring a project.

=== Casting ===
Alongside the series announcement, it was confirmed that Armisen, Heidecker, and Reilly would star in the series.

== Reception ==
Reviews of the series have been mixed. On Rotten Tomatoes, the series holds an approval rating of 57% based on 23 reviews, with an average rating of 6.16/10. The website's critics consensus reads, "Despite a talented central trio and a few great moments, Moonbase 8's portrait of monotonous mediocrity may be too low-key for some viewers to achieve comedic lift off—though that may be exactly the point." On Metacritic, it has a weighted average score of 61 out of 100 based on 18 reviews, indicating "generally favorable reviews".

In reviewing the series in contrast to the other "work-space" comedies of 2020, Avenue 5 and Space Force, Danette Chavez of The A.V. Club stated that Moonbase 8 has the most potential to continue as a comedy on its own merits, beyond the stunt of the space setting. Ben Travers of IndieWire praised the show while saying it still has room to grow, writing "there’s room for creative expansion in future seasons, but this is a small-scale mission that’s off to a solid start".
