= Portlandia =

2011 American TV series

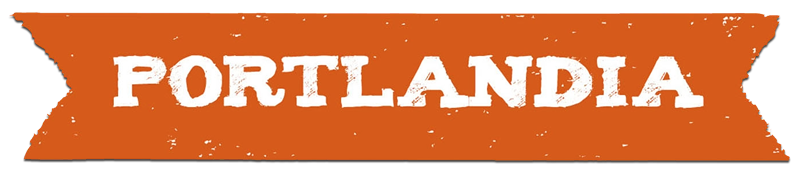
- Genre: Comedy; Satire; Sketch; Surreal humour
- Created by: Fred Armisen; Carrie Brownstein; Jonathan Krisel
- Based on: ThunderAnt by Fred Armisen and Carrie Brownstein
- Written by: Fred Armisen; Carrie Brownstein; Jonathan Krisel; Allison Silverman (season 1); Karey Dornetto (seasons 2, 4–6 & 8); Bill Oakley (seasons 2–3); Graham Wagner (seasons 4–8); Karen Kilgariff (season 7); Megan Neuringer (season 8); Phoebe Robinson (season 8)
- Directed by: Jonathan Krisel (seasons 1–7); Various (seasons 5–8)
- Starring: Fred Armisen; Carrie Brownstein
- Opening theme: "Feel It All Around" by Washed Out
- Country of origin: United States
- Original language: English
- No. of seasons: 8
- No. of episodes: 77 (list of episodes)

Production
- Executive producers: Lorne Michaels; Jonathan Krisel; Fred Armisen; Carrie Brownstein; Andrew Singer
- Production location: Portland, Oregon
- Camera setup: Multiple camera
- Production companies: Broadway Video; IFC Original Productions

Original release
- Network: IFC
- Release: January 21, 2011 – March 22, 2018

Portlandia is an American sketch comedy television series starring Fred Armisen and Carrie Brownstein, set in and around Portland, Oregon, and spoofing the city's reputation as a haven for eccentric hipsters. The show was produced by Broadway Video and IFC Original Productions. It was created by Armisen and Brownstein, along with Jonathan Krisel, who directed it. It debuted on IFC in 2011 and concluded in 2018 after eight seasons.

The show shared its title with the sculpture of the same name that sits above the entrance of the Portland Building on Fifth Avenue in downtown Portland, which appears in the show's title sequence. The show won a Peabody Award.

== Production ==
=== Conception and development ===
Brownstein and Armisen first met in 2003 and began collaborating on a series of internet comedy sketches in 2005 titled ThunderAnt. The sketches became increasingly Portland-centric, with premises ranging from irate diners at a popular Hawthorne District restaurant registering ridiculous complaints on Yelp to a character's disastrous one-man performance at the city's Hollywood Theatre.

In July 2009, the duo pitched their idea for a full-fledged sketch comedy show to IFC and Lorne Michaels' Broadway Video production company, and the project was quickly approved.

Some of the content on the show first appeared in the Internet series. For example, the "Women & Women First" feminist bookstore sketch and its characters, Toni and Candace, originated there.

=== Filming and production ===
The series is set and filmed on location in Portland, Oregon. Production for the first season, consisting of six episodes, began in August 2010 and was completed in September 2010. The budget for the first season was set at less than $1 million (US). Along with Allison Silverman, a former head writer and executive producer for The Colbert Report, and Portlandia director Jonathan Krisel, Armisen and Brownstein wrote the sketches that appear in the first six episodes. Lorne Michaels served as executive producer.

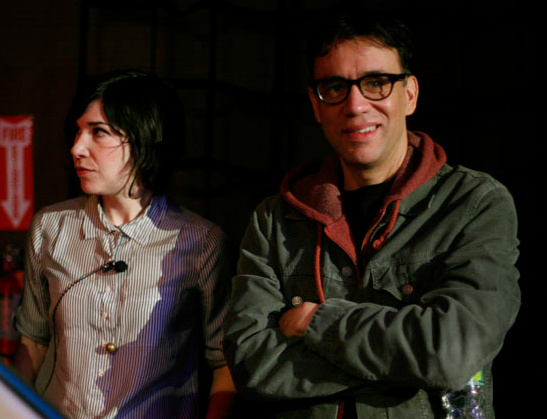
Carrie Brownstein and Fred Armisen, stars of the show

The series stars Fred Armisen and Carrie Brownstein in various roles. Guest stars include: Tim Heidecker; Kirsten Dunst; Olivia Wilde; Selma Blair; Chloë Sevigny; Roseanne Barr; Steve Buscemi; Claire Danes; Kristen Wiig; Rose Byrne; Andy Samberg; Rachel Bloom; Ed Begley Jr.; Aimee Mann; Johnny Marr; Sarah McLachlan; k.d. lang; Jello Biafra; Kurt Vile; Heather Graham; Parker Posey; Michael Nesmith; Glenn Danzig; Aubrey Plaza; Rashida Jones; Anna Gunn; Jane Lynch; Kumail Nanjiani; Jason Sudeikis; Ehren McGhehey; Eddie Vedder of Pearl Jam; Greta Gerwig; Edward James Olmos; Brigitte Nielsen; J Mascis of Dinosaur Jr.; Kate Pierson, Cindy Wilson and Fred Schneider of The B-52's; Josh Homme of Queens of the Stone Age; Gus Van Sant; Tim Robbins; Martina Navratilova; Jeff Goldblum; Juliette Lewis; Joanna Newsom; Annie Clark of St. Vincent; Jack White; Paul Simon; Henry Rollins; Krist Novoselic; Portland Trail Blazers players LaMarcus Aldridge, Damian Lillard, CJ McCollum, and Robin Lopez as themselves; and Kyle MacLachlan as a fictional mayor of Portland. Actual Portland mayor Sam Adams is also featured as an assistant to the mayor. Another episode, including a fictionalized music festival similar to Portland's actual MusicfestNW, featured a rock band played by Colin Meloy and Jenny Conlee of The Decemberists; James Mercer of The Shins; Brownstein's Sleater-Kinney bandmates Corin Tucker and Janet Weiss; and Isaac Brock of Modest Mouse.

On February 14, 2011, IFC ordered a ten-episode second season, which began airing in January 2012. On March 21, 2012, IFC announced its renewal of the show for a third season. On June 12, 2013, the network announced its renewal of Portlandia for fourth and fifth seasons, of ten episodes each, that aired in early 2014 and early 2015. On February 10, 2015, it was announced that IFC had picked up Portlandia for sixth and seventh seasons.

In January 2017, the series was renewed for an eighth and final season to debut in 2018. Filming for the final season began in Portland in June 2017.

== Series overview ==
Season	Episodes	Originally released	
Season	Episodes	First released	Last released
1	6	January 21, 2011	February 25, 2011
2	10	January 6, 2012	March 9, 2012
3	11	December 14, 2012	March 1, 2013
4	10	February 27, 2014	May 1, 2014
5	10	January 8, 2015	March 12, 2015
6	10	January 21, 2016	March 24, 2016
7	10	January 5, 2017	March 9, 2017
8	10	January 18, 2018	March 22, 2018

== Characters ==
Most of the sketches on Portlandia feature Armisen and Brownstein playing one of a variety of pairs of characters, most of which appear in multiple episodes. One of those pairings is "Fred and Carrie", a naturalistic depiction that is supposed to represent versions of the actors as if they were friends living together in a house in Portland. Most of the others use makeup, costumes, and wigs to depict pairings both young and old of various types. Sometimes cross-dressing is incorporated into their costumes, as when Armisen portrays Candace, co-owner of the Women and Women First bookstore, Brownstein plays Andy, a men's rights activist, or when Armisen and Brownstein swap genders to play the couple Nina and Lance.

There are also a small number of recurring characters played by other actors, such as the Mayor of Portland and his assistant (played by Kyle MacLachlan and Sam Adams, the actual mayor from 2009 to 2012), Fred and Carrie's landlord (played by Steve Buscemi, who also directed several episodes), Angel (played by Angel Bouchet, who appears in multiple episodes as herself), a swinger couple (played by Ebbe Roe Smith and Kristine Levine), an owner of many quirky shops (played by Jeff Goldblum) and Carrie's mom (played by Mickey Ronningen, seasons 2, 3, and 5).

Actor Jedediah P. Aaker has appeared on more episodes of the series than any other actors, not including the series' two leads. Some frequently appearing characters are:

- Fred and Carrie: played with minimal costumes, makeup, and hairstyling, these are the show's version of Armisen and Brownstein themselves, living in a house together in Portland. Their onscreen relationship was inspired by Bert and Ernie's relationship on Sesame Street.
- Milton: Fred and Carrie's landlord, played by Steve Buscemi (who also directed several episodes). Milton has an overly casual approach to Fred and Carrie's privacy and a lax attitude regarding necessary repairs.
- Peter and Nance: an earnest and open-hearted middle-aged couple. Peter speaks with a stammer and is open to trying new things, albeit hesitantly; Nance gives him her full support but is often the voice of reason in the couple. They have a tendency to go farther into their new enthusiasms than they expected at first. (for example, a desire to know the source of their free-range chicken ends in their joining a cult).
- Dave and Kath: a very active, overly-intense couple who commit 100% to any new thing they do, causing annoyance to their friends and a generally joyless result. Their interests include things having to do with the outdoors, such as hiking and fleece sweaters.
- Nina and Lance: a couple exhibiting stereotypical gender roles. Lance, played by Brownstein with an electronically deepened voice, is mustached and emotionless and loves fixing cars and riding motorcycles; Nina, played by Armisen, is his high-maintenance girlfriend who loves social media, birthdays, parties, and romance.
- Candace Devereaux and Toni Rose: the proprietors of Women and Women First, a feminist bookstore. Caricatures of Second-wave feminists, they run their bookstore without amenities such as alphabetized stock or a computer to search for books, and are often hostile to customers on the grounds that they lack proper feminist attitudes or use words or gestures that trigger them in various ways. Candace (played by Armisen) harbors barely repressed rage which often boils over into threats of grievous bodily harm to customers who annoy her. In the fifth season it is revealed that before running Women and Women First, both Candace and Toni were high-powered executives in the New York publishing world.
- Spyke and Iris: a non-traditional hipster couple constantly looking for whatever is more authentic, more undiscovered, and more alternative, and always ready to drop something when it is "over". Spyke is known for his opposition to driving and cars in general, given his firm stance on "Bikers' Rights". (This stance eventually shifts in season 4 when Spyke must buy a car for his job.)
- Bryce Shivers and Lisa Eversman: entrepreneurs who start many businesses based on quirky concepts. These characters were the source of the catchphrase "put a bird on it!" from a sketch featuring a business that sold a variety of products with silhouettes of birds attached to turn them into "art". (In the opening sketch of the first episode of the series, Brownstein's character comments that Portland is a city where one can still "put a bird on something and call it art".) The characters are featured again in a skit called "We Can Pickle That", which involves putting various objects in brine.
- Jeffrey and Quinn: young transients living on the streets of Portland who spend their days panhandling and busking with improvised musical instruments (such as drums made of plastic buckets). In one episode, we learn that Quinn is actually a "trustafarian", from a wealthy background.
- The Mayor of Portland (played by Kyle MacLachlan): an enthusiastic but naive booster for the city who constantly thinks up not-quite-plausible improvement schemes which he asks Fred and Carrie to implement. It is revealed that some of the improvements he has made to the city of Portland are actually funded by his parents. Sketches involving the mayor often feature the actual mayor of Portland from 2009 to 2012, Sam Adams, who plays his assistant.
- Royce and Alicia: Public information associates for the Portland Milk Advisory Board who are constantly coming up with new and exotic ways to get people excited about milk and how to promote their kooky new forms of it. Such wacky ideas include cookie milk, berry seed milk, and raw cow milk (an unpasteurized version of milk that has the uncanny presence of blood in it). Alicia often states, "He's my boss!" even though she obviously has better qualifications than Royce, having attended UC Davis. The characters only appeared in interstitial segments in the show during commercial breaks.
- Eco-terrorists: A group of young, eccentric individuals (played by Fred, Carrie, and Olivia Wilde) who attempt to protest major companies and corporations (such as SeaWorld) in the name of ecological rights. Unfortunately their acts rarely actually pan out due to poor planning and group disorganization.
- Kris and Malcolm: an older, mellow couple and parents to multiple children (including one of the eco-terrorists, played by Olivia Wilde). They are overprotective of their children, and portray stereotypes of a relaxed, retired life.
- Brendan and Michelle: two overbearing parents who think they know everything.
- Vince and Jacqueline: a stereotypical goth couple who wear black clothes and white face makeup all the time, drive a hearse, and live in a house filled with funereal decorations.
- Claire and Doug: Claire is a successful career woman, while Doug stays at home and can barely take care of himself. In a Season 6 episode, Claire breaks up with Doug and starts a romantic relationship with Candace (see above).
- The Swingers - played by Ebbe Roe Smith and Kristine Levine (whose character is also named Kristine). A couple living in "the lifestyle" who appear conventional on the surface. They have a four-way sexual encounter with Peter and Nance (see above) after the latter drive by their house on new motorcycles and ask for directions.
- Ed Begley Jr., although nameless in sketches, often portrays a member of the community who is exceedingly eager to please his clientele, even by straying from tradition and overincentivizing. He has portrayed a drug store owner that serves breakfast to undercut the competition, as well as a priest who incorporates acupuncture, collage-crafting, appointment-based mass, and rock and roll as a modern alternative to organ music.

== Reception ==
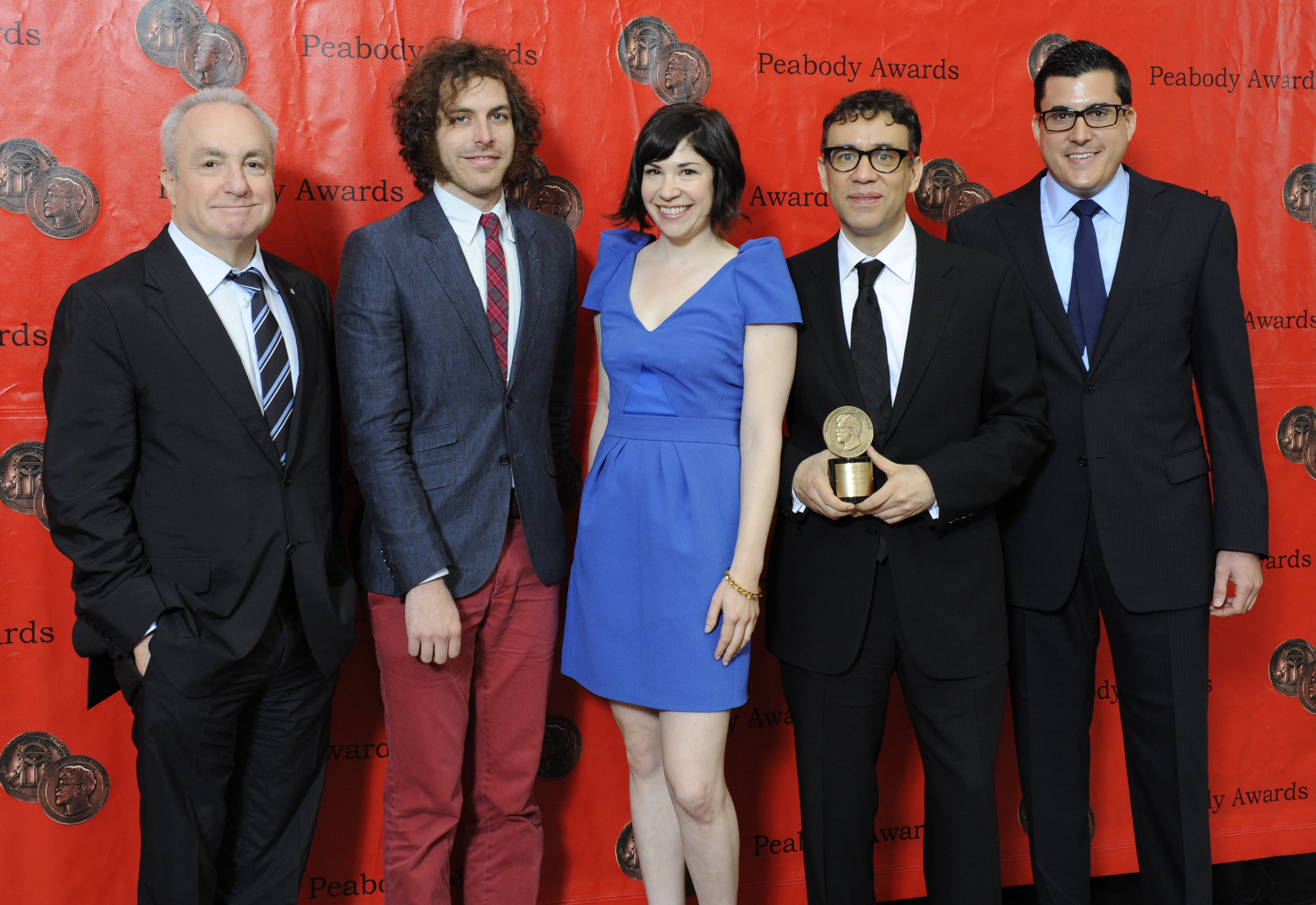
Executive producers Lorne Michaels, Jonathan Krisel, Carrie Brownstein, Fred Armisen and Andrew Singer at the Peabody Awards

Portlandia debuted on IFC on January 21, 2011. IFC "cheered" the first episode's Nielsen ratings of 263,000 viewers (live plus same day); factoring in repeats and three days' worth of DVR viewings, the number grew to 725,000, a figure that does not include an estimated 500,000 online preview viewings on IFC.com, Hulu and YouTube during the days before the official IFC premiere. As of May 1, 2012, the series was available to watch on Netflix in Ireland and the UK.

The show has received mostly positive reviews from television critics. Review aggregator site Metacritic has given the first season a rating of 71 out of 100, and the second season a rating of 75 out of 100. Both of these ratings fall within the site's range of "generally favorable reviews". Robert Lloyd of the Los Angeles Times called the show "funny and charming." Verne Gay of Newsday awarded the series an "A" grade and called it "hilarious". He noted that "Brownstein and Armisen move so effortlessly between characters, then execute their riffs, tics, styles and voices with such skilled abandon that before long this doesn't seem like satire any longer but a fun house mirror reflection of intensely real people." Contrarily, Brian Lowry, writing for Variety, noted that the show was "clearly on a shoestring budget" and said that it featured an "array of tiresome characters" that provided "further proof not everyone deserves a sketch comedy showcase - especially when the premise cuts no deeper than vignettes inspired by the wheat-germy, hippie-ish environs of Portland, Ore." Comedian Jerry Seinfeld is a fan of the show. In a 2014 interview he said, "I think that's the best comedy on TV right now, and it's easily one of the best comedies of all time".

The sketches set in the feminist bookstore "Women and Women First" were filmed in an actual independent bookstore, In Other Words; this name can be seen on the chalkboard listing in-store events behind the cash register. At one point the real bookstore and community center used the show to promote itself, but the relationship broke down in 2016. The volunteer board wrote in a blog post that the bookstore and staff were mistreated during a filming session, and went on to say that "the Women and Women First segments ... are trans-antagonistic and trans-misogynist and have only become more offensive as the show goes on."

== Awards and nominations ==
Portlandia won a Peabody Award in 2011 "for its good-natured lampooning of hipster culture, which hits the mark whether or not you’re in on the joke." Portlandia also won an Emmy Award in 2011 for Outstanding Costumes for a Variety Program or Special and was also nominated for Outstanding Directing for a Variety Series and Outstanding Writing for a Variety Series in the 64th Primetime Emmy Awards. Former Portland mayor Sam Adams (2009 to 2012) also appeared on the show and proclaimed January 21, 2011, Portlandia Day. The proclamation included a decorative bird, referring to a joke in the TV series. A bicycle tour company began offering Portlandia tours.

For the 66th Primetime Emmy Awards, the show received nominations in Outstanding Supporting Actor in a Comedy Series for Fred Armisen, Outstanding Writing for a Variety Series, Outstanding Directing for a Variety Series for Jonathan Krisel, and Outstanding Guest Actor in a Comedy Series for Steve Buscemi for the episode "Celery".

Year	Award	Category	Nominated work	Result	Ref.
2011	Primetime Emmy Awards	Outstanding Costumes for a Variety, Music Program, or Special	Amanda Needham and Nichole Dimitras (for "Farm")	Won	
2012	Primetime Emmy Awards	Outstanding Directing for a Variety Series	Jonathan Krisel (for "One Moore Episode")	Nominated	
2012	Primetime Emmy Awards	Outstanding Writing for a Variety Series	Fred Armisen, Carrie Brownstein, Jonathan Krisel and Karey Dornetto	Nominated	
2012	Peabody Award	Area of Excellence	Portlandia	Won	
2012	Writers Guild of America Awards	Comedy/Variety (including talk) series	Fred Armisen, Carrie Brownstein, Karey Dornetto, Jonathan Krisel, Bill Oakley	Won	
2013	Primetime Emmy Awards	Outstanding Directing for a Variety Series	Jonathan Krisel (for "Alexandra")	Nominated	
2013	Primetime Emmy Awards	Outstanding Writing for a Variety Series	Fred Armisen, Carrie Brownstein, Jonathan Krisel and Bill Oakley	Nominated	
2013	Primetime Emmy Awards	Outstanding Costumes for a Variety Program or a Special	Amanda Needham (for "Blackout")	Won	
2013	Writers Guild of America Awards	Comedy/Variety (including talk) series	Fred Armisen, Carrie Brownstein, Jonathan Krisel, Bill Oakley	Nominated	
2013	Art Directors Guild Awards	Multi-Camera Unscripted Series	Tyler Robinson, Schuyler Telleen and Katherine Isom	Won	
2014	Primetime Emmy Awards	Outstanding Supporting Actor in a Comedy Series	Fred Armisen	Nominated	
2014	Primetime Emmy Awards	Outstanding Guest Actor in a Comedy Series	Steve Buscemi	Nominated	
2014	Primetime Emmy Awards	Outstanding Directing for a Variety Series	Jonathan Krisel (for "Getting Away")	Nominated	
2014	Primetime Emmy Awards	Outstanding Writing for a Variety Series	Fred Armisen, Carrie Brownstein, Jonathan Krisel, Graham Wagner and Karey Dornetto	Nominated	
2014	Primetime Emmy Awards	Outstanding Art Direction for Variety, Nonfiction, Reality or Reality-Competition Program	Tyler B. Robinson, Schuyler Telleen and Katherine Isom (for "Celery")	Nominated	
2014	Primetime Emmy Awards	Outstanding Single-Camera Picture Editing for a Comedy Series	Bill Benz and Daniel Gray Longino (for "Getting Away")	Nominated	
2014	Online Film & Television Association Award	Best Direction in a Comedy Series	Portlandia	Nominated	
2014	Online Film & Television Association Award	Best Guest Actor in a Comedy Series	Steve Buscemi	Nominated	
2015	Primetime Emmy Awards	Outstanding Variety Sketch Series	Lorne Michaels, Fred Armisen, Carrie Brownstein, Jonathan Krisel, Andrew Singer, Karey Dornetto, Graham Wagner, David Cress and Alice Mathias	Nominated	
2015	Primetime Emmy Awards	Outstanding Production Design for Variety, Nonfiction, Reality, or Reality-Competition Programming	Tyler Robinson, Schuyler Telleen, and Katherine Isom ("Dead Pets","Call Me Al," and "Fashion")	Won	
2015	Critics' Choice Television Awards	Best Supporting Actress in a Comedy Series	Carrie Brownstein	Nominated	
2015	Online Film & Television Association Award	Best Male Performance in a Fiction Program	Fred Armisen	Nominated	
2015	Online Film & Television Association Award	Best Female Performance in a Fiction Program	Carrie Brownstein	Nominated	
2015	Online Film & Television Association Award	Best Ensemble in a Fiction Program		Nominated	
2016	Primetime Emmy Awards	Outstanding Variety Sketch Series	Lorne Michaels, Fred Armisen, Carrie Brownstein, Jonathan Krisel, Andrew Singer, Karey Dornetto, Graham Wagner, Alice Mathias, and David Cress	Nominated	
2016	Primetime Emmy Awards	Outstanding Writing for a Variety Series	Fred Armisen, Carrie Brownstein, Jonathan Krisel, Graham Wagner and Karey Dornetto	Nominated	
2016	Primetime Emmy Awards	Outstanding Production Design for a Variety, Nonfiction, Reality, or Reality-Competition Series	Schuyler Telleen and Katherine Isom (for "Family Emergency," "Pickathon," "Weirdo Beach")	Won	
2016	Online Film & Television Association Award	Best Variety Program	Portlandia	Nominated	
2016	Online Film & Television Association Award	Best Female Performance in a Variety Program	Carrie Brownstein	Nominated	
2016	Online Film & Television Association Award	Best Ensemble in a Variety, Reality or Non-Fiction Program		Nominated	
2016	Online Film & Television Association Award	Best Writing of a Variety Program		Nominated	
2016	Art Directors Guild Awards	Variety, Reality or Competition Series	Schuyler Telleen	Nominated	
2017	Primetime Emmy Awards	Outstanding Variety Sketch Series	Lorne Michaels, Fred Armisen, Carrie Brownstein, Jonathan Krisel, Andrew Singer, Graham Wagner, Alice Mathias and David Cress	Nominated	
2017	Primetime Emmy Awards	Outstanding Costumes for Variety, Nonfiction or Reality Program	Amanda Needham, Jayme Hansen and Jordan Hamilton (for "Carrie Dates a Hunk")	Nominated	
2017	Primetime Emmy Awards	Outstanding Production Design for a Variety, Nonfiction, Reality, or Reality-Competition Series	Schuyler Telleen and Katherine Isom (for "Fred's Cell Phone Company")	Nominated	
2018	Primetime Emmy Awards	Outstanding Variety Sketch Series	Lorne Michaels, Fred Armisen, Carrie Brownstein, Jonathan Krisel, Andrew Singer, Graham Wagner, Alice Mathias, Karey Dornetto and David Cress	Nominated	
2018	Primetime Emmy Awards	Outstanding Directing for a Variety Series	Carrie Brownstein (for "Riot Spray")	Nominated	
2018	ACE Eddie Awards	Best Edited Comedy Series for Commercial Television	Heather Capps, Ali Greer and Jordan Kim (for "Amore")	Nominated	
2018	Art Directors Guild Awards	Variety or Competition Series/Awards or Event Special	Schuyler Telleen (for "Portland Secedes", "Ants", "Fred’s Cell Phone Company")	Won	
2018	Writers Guild of America Awards	Comedy/Variety - Sketch Series	Fred Armisen, Carrie Brownstein, Karen Kilgariff, Jonathan Krisel, Graham Wagner	Nominated	

== Home media and international release ==
Portlandia: Season One was released on Region 1 DVD and Blu-ray on December 6, 2011, and Region 4 on August 1, 2012. The one disc set consists of all six episodes of its first season. Special features include; Extended Scenes, Bloopers, An IFC Behind-the-Scenes Featurette, "Thunder Ant" Sketches, and Audio Commentary by Armisen and Brownstein.

Portlandia: Season Two was released on Region 1 DVD and Blu-ray on September 25, 2012, and Region 4 on August 7, 2013. The two disc set consists of all ten episodes of season two. Special features include; "Portlandia: the Tour: Seattle" Featurette, "Inside Portlandia" Featurette, "Feminist Bookstore" Deleted Scene, "Brunch Village: the Director's Cut", Excerpt from the Portlandia book and Audio Commentary by Armisen, Brownstein and Krisel.

There is also a combination set of both seasons available. Portlandia was also distributed in some countries on the iTunes store, Netflix and Amazon Video. In Australia it is screened on the Australian Broadcasting Corporation's station ABC2 and on its iView video streaming service. The series was premiered in Latin America on March 27, 2012, on the channel I.Sat.

== See also ==
- Culture of Portland, Oregon
- "The Day the Earth Stood Cool", a 2012 episode of The Simpsons featuring Armisen and Brownstein
- Lady Dynamite, a television series starring Maria Bamford that crossed over with Portlandia at the end of season seven
