= Lindsay Shookus =

American television producer (born 1980)

- Born: June 18, 1980 (age 46); Williamsville, New York, U.S.
- Education: University of North Carolina at Chapel Hill
- Occupation: Television producer
- Years active: 2002–present
- Spouse: Kevin Miller (m. 2010; div. 2014)
- Children: 1

Lindsay Anne Shookus (born June 18, 1980) is an American television producer. She has been nominated for 10 Emmy Awards, winning four times, for her work on Saturday Night Live.

== Early life ==
Shookus's father, Robert, owned a manufacturers representative business while her mother, Christine, worked as a pharmaceutical sales representative. She has one older brother, Jeff, and one younger sister, Sara. She was raised in Williamsville, New York, and attended Williamsville South High School, where she was president of her junior and senior high school classes. She studied journalism at University of North Carolina at Chapel Hill from 1998 to 2002.

== Career ==
After graduating from college in 2002, Shookus was hired as Marci Klein's assistant on Saturday Night Live. In 2008, she became an associate producer on the show and also had producing credits on 45 episodes of 30 Rock between 2008 and 2010. She was named an SNL co-producer in 2010, and was named as a producer in 2012. She is head of the show's talent department, booking hosts and musical guests, as well as scouting potential cast members. She was named one of Billboard's 50 Most Powerful Music Executives in both 2015 and 2016. After 20 years at SNL, Shookus left the show in 2022.

Shookus and friend Kristin O'Keeffe Merrick host an annual "Women Work Fucking Hard" networking event in New York, which spotlights female entrepreneurs and encourages women to help each other succeed in business.

== Personal life ==
Shookus met television producer Kevin Miller in 2002 and they married in 2010. Their daughter was born in early 2013. The couple separated in 2014 and later divorced. She dated Ben Affleck from 2017 to 2018, and again in early 2019.

During the 2016 presidential campaign, Shookus supported Hillary Clinton and was a member of the Emily's List Creative Council.
