= Addicted to Fresno =

2015 film by Jamie Babbit

- Theatrical release poster
- Directed by: Jamie Babbit
- Written by: Karey Dornetto
- Produced by: Andrea Sperling; Stephanie Meurer
- Starring: Natasha Lyonne; Judy Greer; Molly Shannon; Fred Armisen; Ron Livingston; Aubrey Plaza
- Cinematography: Jeffrey Waldron
- Edited by: Suzanne Spangler
- Music by: Nathan Matthew David
- Production companies: Gamechanger Films; Andrea Sperling Productions; Leeden Media; Lakeview Productions; TALU Productions
- Distributed by: Gravitas Ventures
- Release dates: March 14, 2015 (SXSW); October 2, 2015 (United States)
- Running time: 85 minutes
- Country: United States
- Language: English

Addicted to Fresno (formerly Fresno) is a 2015 American dark comedy film directed by Jamie Babbit and written by Karey Dornetto. The film stars Natasha Lyonne and Judy Greer as two sisters who find themselves in trouble after housekeeper Shannon Jackson (Greer) accidentally kills a guest at the hotel employing her and younger sister Martha (Lyonne). The film had its world premiere on March 14, 2015, at South by Southwest. It was released in the United States on September 1, 2015, through video on demand, and was given a limited theatrical release on October 2, 2015, by Gravitas Ventures.

== Plot ==
In Fresno, California, optimistic Martha Jackson works as a housekeeper at a local hotel. Her older sister Shannon is a sex addict and frequently goes to rehab. Since Shannon is unemployed, Martha offers her a job as a housekeeper at the hotel. As a celebration for Shannon's first day on the job, they go to a local bar. Afterwards, Martha takes Shannon back to her house and tells her where things are while she is away. However, Shannon sneaks off to the house of her married therapist, Edwin, with whom she is having an affair. Meanwhile, Martha works out at the gym. Her trainer Kelly starts to take interest in her.

The next morning at the hotel, Shannon and Martha meet Boris, a slob who says that he knows everyone at the hotel. While taking a break, Shannon calls Edwin again. Edwin tells Shannon that he gave his wife a letter and had left her the minute she received it. Realizing that Edwin cannot go back to his wife, Shannon takes her anger out by going to Boris' room to have sex with him. Martha catches her in the act after she hears her scream in the distance. While Shannon defends herself from Boris, she accidentally kills him. Desperate to cover up the murder, they sneak Boris' corpse out of the hotel.

After sneaking out of the hotel, they take the corpse to Boris' family who has taken a disliking towards him. Shannon, posing as Boris' life guru, meets his sister Margaret. Margaret invites Shannon in to convince her parents that Boris has moved on in life and has left Fresno to never come back or to talk to his family again.

Martha and Shannon take the corpse over to their friends Gerald and Ruby, who own a pet cemetery. After uncovering Boris' corpse, they at first threaten to call the police, but then decide to blackmail the sisters for $25,000 by Monday in exchange for covering up the murder, threatening to charge them with manslaughter if they are unable to come up with the money. They initially attempt to rob an adult store to steal all the merchandise and try to sell them to lesbians at an event being held at the local hotel they work at, only to discover they did not make enough money.

To take the stress off, Martha goes to the gym while Shannon hooks up with her co-worker Eric. At the gym, Kelly informs Martha that one of her students is having a bar mitzvah and that she wants to bring Martha along as a date. After the gym, Martha returns and catches Shannon making out with Eric, much to her annoyance. While discussing the bar mitzvah the next day, they realize they can steal all of the money. Martha and Shannon double date with Kelly and Eric. Martha pretends she is choking on something to distract the crowd long enough to steal the money. Kelly asks to bring Martha back to her house to keep an eye on her, but Martha rejects. Kelly confesses that she is attracted to Martha, but Martha blows her off by telling her about her sister who has problems.

After the bar mitzvah, they realize they only stole $12,000, which is not enough money for Gerald and Ruby. Ruby, however, reluctantly agrees to cremate Boris' corpse. They then arrange a fake funeral for her dead "dog". Martha discovers Shannon having sex with Gerald, which is the final straw for Martha. Shannon tries to apologize, but Martha tells her that she is tired of helping her and that she does not want her to go back to her place.

Martha goes to reconcile with Kelly, and Shannon comes across Margaret who thanks her for the advice that Shannon gave. Realizing she has no one to talk to, she turns herself in. Two years later, it is revealed that she and Martha write letters to each other while Shannon is in prison, stating that "I hate you which in case you forgot means I love you like a sister."

== Cast ==
- Natasha Lyonne as Martha Jackson, Shannon's younger and optimistic sister who works at the hotel
- Judy Greer as Shannon Jackson, Martha's selfish older sister, sex addict and registered sex offender
- Aubrey Plaza as Kelly, Martha's gay trainer who takes interest in her
- Malcolm Barrett as Eric, an employee at the hotel and Shannon's love interest
- Jessica St. Clair as Kristen, a front desk employee at the hotel who went to school with Shannon
- Fred Armisen as Gerald, a friend of the Jacksons who owns a pet cemetery
- Molly Shannon as Margaret, Boris's sister who mistakes Shannon as a guru
- John Roohinian as Noah, one of Kelly's students who has a bar mitzvah
- Michael Hitchcock as David, Noah's father
- Ron Livingston as Edwin, Shannon's married friend who has an affair with her
- Allison Tolman as Ruby, Gerald's wife who threatens to blackmail the Jacksons
- Jon Daly as Boris Lipka, a slob who knows every employee at the hotel
- Kumail Nanjiani as Damon, a member of the sex addict group that Shannon participates in
- Clea DuVall as Regina
- Alan Mandell as Arthur Lipka, Boris and Margaret's father
- Edward Barbanell as Jerry, the manager of the hotel

== Production ==
While writing the script, Karey Dornetto partially drew upon her own past relationship with her sister, wondering, "What if I still lived in my same hometown and we were in this sort of a meshed relationship, like a co-dependent relationship?". From there she began to add the film's fictional elements such as Shannon's sex addiction.

Filming was initially intended to take place in Cleveland, but due to budget issues, Dornetto and Jamie Babbit had to shift the film's setting to Fresno, a location they chose because it seemed like it was a city people wanted to get away from. Babbit and her films were very successful at the Fresno Reel Pride Film Festival, which she attended several times, giving her an idea of the city's pros and cons. (Producer Andrea Sperling also enjoyed a strong relationship with Reel Pride). The film was workshopped as part of the "Made in Cleveland" project, an anthology of 11 short films. Shot in Cleveland in 2012 and released in theaters in 2013, the short film was called Fucking Cleveland, starred Busy Philipps and Gillian Jacobs in the lead roles, and was shot on a budget of $50,000.

In August 2014, it was announced that Judy Greer and Natasha Lyonne would portray the two central characters of Fresno, marking the second time Lyonne had worked with Babbit. The two actresses stated that part of the reason that they chose to act in the film was because their characters were atypical to how they were traditionally cast, as Lyonne is usually cast as a "trainwreck" while Greer was usually the "levelheaded" character. The actors were encouraged to engage in improvisation, though they stayed close to the script. Influences included Welcome to the Dollhouse (1995), Bottle Rocket (1996), and Bridesmaids (2011). Shooting took place in Los Angeles.

Nathan Matthew David composed the score.

== Release ==
The film had its world premiere at the SXSW Film Festival on March 14, 2015. The film premiered at the Toronto LGBT Film Festival on May 23, 2015, and premiered at the Frameline Film Festival on June 26, 2015. The film also premiered in the United Kingdom on June 27, 2015, at the Edinburgh International Film Festival. On May 28, 2015, the films distribution rights were acquired by Gravitas Ventures with a planned fall 2015 release. The film was released on September 1, 2015, through video on demand, prior to being released on October 2, 2015, in a limited theatrical release.

== Reception ==
On the review aggregator website Rotten Tomatoes, 32% of 28 critics' reviews are positive, with an average rating of 4.2/10. The website's consensus reads: "While Greer and Lyonne's sisterly chemistry carries Addicted to Fresno, it's not enough to overlook the script's missteps in humor and levity." On Metacritic, the film has a weighted average score of 34 out of 100, based on reviews from 11 critics, indicating "generally unfavorable" reviews.

In a mixed review, CraveOnline wrote that it "is full of gleeful raunchiness and a registered sex offender or two, but not much actual comedy." The Austin Chronicle wrote, "This heavy comedy, scripted by Karey Dornetto, delivers its expected yield of snappy and emotionally charged levity from a charismatic cast that also features Fred Armisen, Molly Shannon, and Aubrey Plaza in supporting roles. But as the story's centerpiece, Greer's character ultimately gives the audience too little to root for. Insufferable and unrepentant until far too late, we don't feel conflicted like we should when her lone true ally finally says 'enough is enough.' And although it's hard to pry our eyes away from such a cool cast, by that time the feeling is mutual." Variety was also mixed in their opinion, as they felt that the work would likely not gather the cult following that Babbit's 1999 film But I'm a Cheerleader received and that Fresno was overall "a mean-spirited farce whose strenuous bad taste seldom translates into actual laughs."

Slant Magazine wrote, "Brightly lit and cheerfully acted, Jamie Babbit's Fresno pushes its not-so-funny premise almost to the breaking point, sacrificing character development on the altar of comedy along the way." Aaron Hillis of The Village Voice called the film "consistently frickin' hilarious". Flavorwire wrote, "As a performer's showcase, it's hard to beat. Judy Greer and Natasha Lyonne anchor it with a priceless good sister/bad sister dynamic; Lyonne is atypically sunny (and typically delightful) while Greer, as a bitter burnout, puts a sharp little spin on every line, turning each into a little dagger. Aubrey Plaza also shines in a brief but juicy bit as a would-be love interest for Lyonne."
