= Tom Broecker =

American costume designer

Broecker in 2026

Tom Broecker is an American television actor and Emmy-award winning costume designer. Currently, he is the costume designer for Saturday Night Live (since 1994) and Flesh and Bone (Starz). He was the costume designer for NBC's 30 Rock, where he also played the recurring role of Lee the costume designer on the show-within-a-show. Other TV credits include House of Cards (Netflix), the first season of The Comeback and the second of season of In Treatment for HBO, The Big C (Showtime), The Beautiful Life on the CW and the pilot of Castle on ABC.

His Broadway credits include Will Ferrell's You're Welcome America, A Final Night with George W Bush, David Mamet's Race, Side Man and Everyday Rapture. He has designed in dozens of theaters across the country including The Manhattan Theatre Club, the Public, Playwrights Horizons, Second Stage, Oregon Shakespeare Festival, Hartford Stage, McCarter Theatre, Yale Rep., Shakespeare Theatre DC, Indiana Rep., CenterStage, Opera Theatre of St. Louis and Williamstown.

He is a 1984 graduate of Wabash College and a graduate of the Yale School of Drama. He is a 1980 graduate of Carmel High School in Carmel, Indiana.

He has been nominated for an Emmy six times winning in 2014 for Saturday Night Live and for a CDG (Costume Designers Guild) award five times, winning in 2013 for the first season of House of Cards.
