= Jonathan Krisel =

American screenwriter (born 1979)

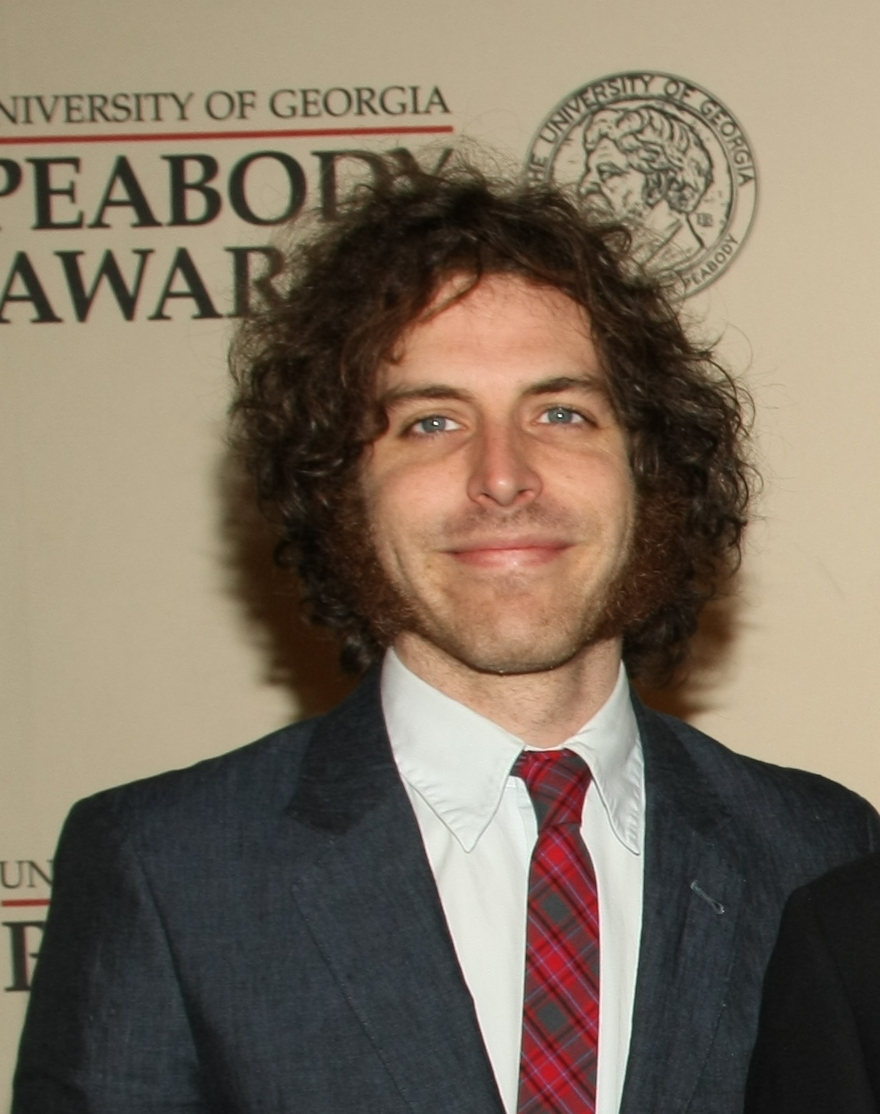
- Jonathan Krisel at the 71st Annual Peabody Awards
- Born: January 4, 1979 (age 47); United States
- Other name: Jon
- Occupations: Director, producer, writer actor
- Years active: 1996–present

Jonathan Krisel (/ˈkraɪzəl/; born January 4, 1979) is an American director, producer, writer, editor, and occasional actor. He is best known for co-creating the series Portlandia (for which he also directed and co-wrote the majority of episodes), and he is also known for the 2016 FX series Baskets. Krisel has collaborated with the comedy duo Tim & Eric, beginning with Tom Goes to the Mayor, and later directed most episodes of both Tim and Eric Awesome Show, Great Job! and Check It Out! with Dr. Steve Brule. He executive produced several other TV series, including Kroll Show, Man Seeking Woman, and most recently the Showtime series Moonbase 8. He executive produced the Fox pilot Ghosted and has also collaborated with The Lonely Island on several SNL Digital Shorts.

== Career ==
Jonathan Krisel first began working with the comedy duo Tim & Eric in 2006 on their animated series Tom Goes to the Mayor, where he worked as an animator, producer, and senior editor. Next, he worked as director, writer, co-executive producer, and senior editor on their sketch comedy series Tim and Eric Awesome Show, Great Job! from 2007 to 2010. Further, he directed episodes of Check It Out! with Dr. Steve Brule and contributed to the script of the 2012 film Tim and Eric's Billion Dollar Movie. He also worked as a producer and creative collaborator on several Digital Shorts for the sketch comedy television series Saturday Night Live.

Since 2011, he has co-created, written, and executive produced every episode of and directed 52 episodes (including the first 44) of the satirical sketch comedy series Portlandia, starring Carrie Brownstein and Fred Armisen on IFC network. Furthermore, Krisel co-created the show and appeared in three episodes. He has also directed episodes of Kroll Show, Man Seeking Woman, and the Showtime series Moonbase 8.

He is the co-creator of the comedy series Baskets, alongside comedians Louis C.K. and Zach Galifianakis, with the latter starring in the project. Krisel is also the program's executive producer and primary director. The show premiered on FX on January 21, 2016.

He is also the grandson of child actress Virginia Weidler.

On September 30, 2018, Krisel was announced to write and direct an upcoming Sesame Street movie.

On March 3, 2023, Krisel was announced to direct the sequel to Detective Pikachu.

== Filmography ==
Short film

Year	Title	Director	Editor
2009	Rich Dicks	Yes	Yes
2010	Ed Hardy Boyz: The Case of the Missing Sick Belt Buckle	Yes	No
2010	The Red Roof Inn Chronicles	Yes	Yes

Television

Year	Title	Director	Writer	Executive Producer	Notes
2004–2006	Tom Goes to the Mayor	No	No	No	17 episodes, animator, producer, senior editor
2007–2010	Tim and Eric Awesome Show, Great Job!	Yes	Yes	Co-executive	52 episodes
2010	Check It Out! with Dr. Steve Brule	Yes	No	No	6 episodes, Also senior editor
2010	Funny or Die Presents	Segment	No	No	4 episodes
2010–2011	Saturday Night Live	Yes	Yes	No	SNL Digital Shorts
2011–2018	Portlandia	Yes	Yes	Yes	Also actor
2013–2014	Kroll Show	Yes	Yes	Yes	
2015	Man Seeking Woman	Yes	No	Yes	5 episodes
2016–2019	Baskets	Yes	Yes	Yes	Also creator
2017	Ghosted	Yes	No	Yes	Episode: "Pilot"
2020	Moonbase 8	Yes	Yes	Yes	
2024–2025	English Teacher	Yes	No	Yes	7 episodes
2025–2026	Adults	Yes	No	Yes	3 episodes
2026	Rooster	Yes	No	Yes	Episode: "Release the Brown Fat"
