= Karey Dornetto =

American screenwriter

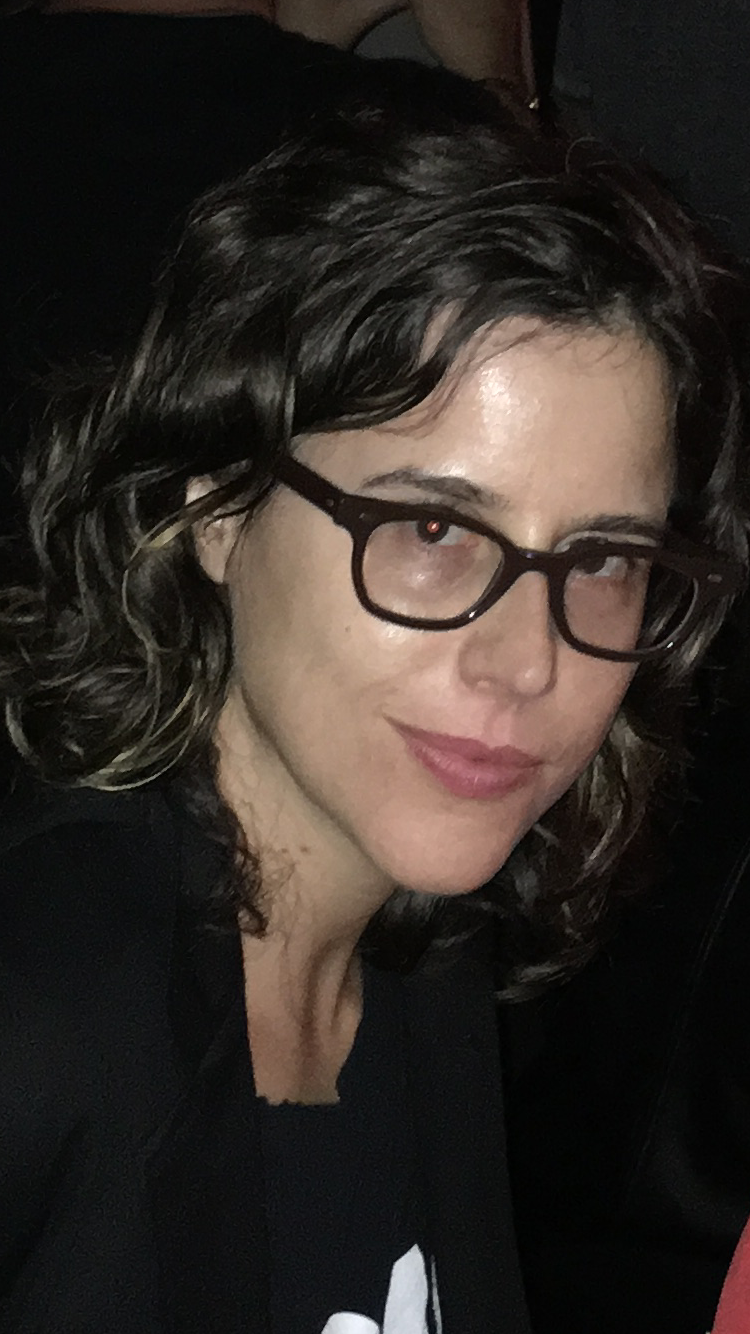
- Occupation: Screenwriter
- Years active: 2002–present
- Spouse: Jamie Babbit (m. 2014)

Karey Dornetto is an American screenwriter who has written for television series such as Arrested Development, Community, Portlandia and South Park. She also wrote the script for the feature-length film Addicted to Fresno.

== Early life ==
Karey Dornetto was born and raised in Charleston, South Carolina. Before becoming a writer Dornetto majored in finance at the University of South Carolina. After graduating, Dornetto worked for the Bank of America and also had a brief stint working with the comedy group The Perch. She relocated to New York City through her Bank of America job and quickly became immersed in comedic writing. In New York City, Dornetto began doing stand up comedy and tried her hand at writing for different publications which she found to be quite enjoyable. Following her interest in comedy Dornetto sent a selection of her work to agent Matt Rice who landed her a job in Los Angeles writing for South Park.

== Career ==
=== Television ===
Most of Dornetto's writing experience is for television shows. She has written for South Park (2002), The Jamie Kennedy Experiment (2003-2004), Arrested Development (2005-2006), iCarly (2008), Community (2010-2011), Kroll Show (2013), and Portlandia (2012-2018). Dornetto has also written for short-lived television shows such as Dog Bites Man (2006) and The New Normal (2013). In 2014 Dornetto appeared on an episode of Comedy Central's Drunk History, where she narrated the story of Babe Didrikson Zaharias. She wrote episode 7 ("Blowfish") of Common Side Effects (2025), for which she also served as consulting producer.

=== Film ===
Addicted to Fresno was Karey Dornetto's first feature-length screenplay and was written with the intent of being directed by wife Jamie Babbit. The film's original concept developed from Dornetto's experiences of having an older sister. The film, starring Judy Greer and Natasha Lyonne, premiered at South by Southwest in 2015 and was also shown at Toronto's LGBT Film Festival, L.A.'s Outfest, Edinburgh's International Film Festival and the Frameline Film Festival.

=== Books ===
Karey Dornetto is the author and illustrator of the book 101 Ways to Shave Your Ass.

== Personal life ==
Karey Dornetto is the daughter of professor Lou Dornetto and ex-nun, Kathy Dornetto. She also has one older sister, Kelly. Karey Dornetto came out to her parents as gay at the age of 24.

Dornetto currently lives in Los Angeles, CA with her wife Jamie Babbit and two step daughters Finley and Ryder. The couple has worked on several projects together including Addicted To Fresno which Karey wrote and Babbit directed.

== Awards and nominations ==
Year	association	Category	Work	Result
2006	Writers Guild of America	Comedy Series	Arrested Development	Nominated
2007	Writers Guild of America	Comedy Series	Arrested Development	Nominated
2012	Primetime Emmy Awards	Outstanding Writing for a Variety Series	Portlandia	Nominated
2013	Writers Guild of America	Comedy/Variety (Including Talk) - Series	Portlandia	Won
2014	Primetime Emmy Awards	Outstanding Writing for a Variety Series	Portlandia	Nominated
2015	Primetime Emmy Awards	Outstanding Variety Sketch Series	Portlandia	Nominated
