= List of hospital stations =

This is a general list of transit/transportation stations serving at least one hospital, with any variation of the word 'hospital' in its name. For a list of stations called Hospital station (exact), see Hospital station (disambiguation).

== Asia ==
=== China ===
==== Chengdu ====
- Chengdu First People's Hospital station, a rapid transit station
- Chengdu Second People's Hospital station, a rapid transit station
- Chengdu Junqu General Hospital station, a rapid transit station
- Chengdu University of TCM & Sichuan Provincial People's Hospital station, a rapid transit station
- Provincial Orthopaedics Hospital station, a rapid transit station

==== Zhengzhou ====
- Children's Hospital station, a rapid transit station
- Henan People's Hospital station, a rapid transit station

==== Other ====
- Affiliated Hospital station, a rapid transit station in Hohhot
- Jingxi Nanfang Hospital station, a rapid transit station in Guangzhou
- People's Hospital station (Wuxi Metro), a rapid transit station in Wuxi
- Queen Mary Hospital station, a proposed rapid transit station in Hong Kong
- Suzhou 3rd Hospital Station, the former name of Shantang Jie station, a rapid transit station in Suzhou
- Tongji Hospital station, a rapid transit station in Wuhan
- Union Hospital station, a light rapid transit station in Macau

=== Japan ===
- Aki General Hospital Station, a railway station in Aki City
- Naha City Hospital Station, a monorail station in Naha
- St. Mary's Hospital Station, a railway station in Kurume
- Tagawa Municipal Hospital Station, a railway station in Tagawa

=== South Korea ===
==== Daegu ====
- Kyungpook National University Hospital station, a rapid transit station
- Yeungnam University Hospital station, a rapid transit station

==== Seoul ====
- Korea University Hospital station (formally named Anam station), a rapid transit station
- National Police Hospital station, a rapid transit station
- Seoul Veteran's Hospital Station (formally named VHS Medical Center Station), a rapid transit station

==== Other ====
- The Catholic University of Korea Incheon St. Mary's Hospital Station (Bupyeong station), a rapid transit station in Incheon

=== Taiwan ===
==== Taipei ====
- Far Eastern Hospital station, a rapid transit station
- NTU Hospital metro station, a rapid transit station serving National Taiwan University Hospital
- Wanfang Hospital metro station, a rapid transit station

==== Other ====
- Chang Gung Memorial Hospital metro station, a rapid transit station in Taoyuan City

=== Other ===
- Hamad Hospital station, a rapid transit station in Doha, Qatar

== Europe ==
=== United Kingdom ===
- Christ's Hospital railway station, in Horsham, England
- James Cook University Hospital station (formally named James Cook station), a railway station in Middlesbrough, England
- Watford Hospital station, a proposed rapid transit station in Watford, England

=== Other ===
- Hospital de São João station, a light rail station in Porto, Portugal
- Oslo Hospital tram stop, a light rail stop in Oslo, Norway

== North America ==
=== Canada ===
- Grand River Hospital station, a light rail transit station in Kitchener, Ontario

=== United States ===
==== California ====
- County Hospital station (formally known as LA General Medical Center station, a bus rapid transit station in Los Angeles
- Westwood/VA Hospital station, a rapid transit station in Los Angeles

==== New York ====
- 77th Street–Lenox Hill Hospital station, a rapid transit station in Manhattan
- Allen/Hospital station (now named Allen/Medical Campus station), a light metro station in Buffalo
- Central Islip State Hospital station, a former commuter rail station in Islip
- Humboldt–Hospital station, a light metro station in Buffalo
- Pilgrim State Hospital station, a former commuter rail station in West Brentwood
- State Hospital station (now named Harlem Valley–Wingdale station), a commuter rail station in Wingdale

==== Other ====
- Ashwood/Hospital Station (Link station) (formally known as Wilburton station, a light rail station in Bellevue, Washington
- Johns Hopkins Hospital station, a rapid transit station in Baltimore, Maryland
- Memorial Hermann Hospital/Houston Zoo station, a light rail station in Houston, Texas
- Memorial Hospital station, a light rail station in Belleville, Illinois
- VCU Hospital station, a bus rapid transit stop serving the Virginia Commonwealth University Medical Center, in Richmond, Virginia

== Oceania ==
=== Australia ===
- Gold Coast University Hospital station, a light rail station in Queensland

== South America ==
=== Columbia ===
- Hospital station (Medellín), a rapid transit station serving the University Hospital of San Vicente de Paúl, in Medellín

== See also ==
- Hospital station (disambiguation)
- Hospital (disambiguation)
