= Stulz (company) =

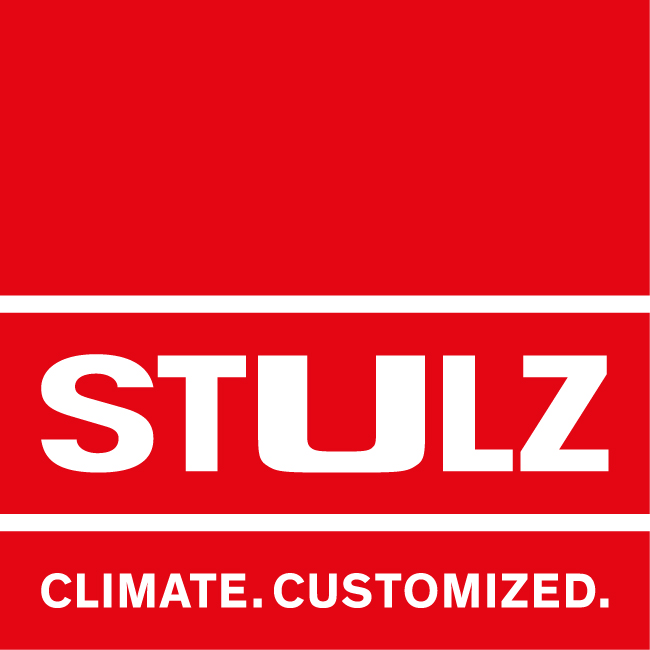
- Stulz logo

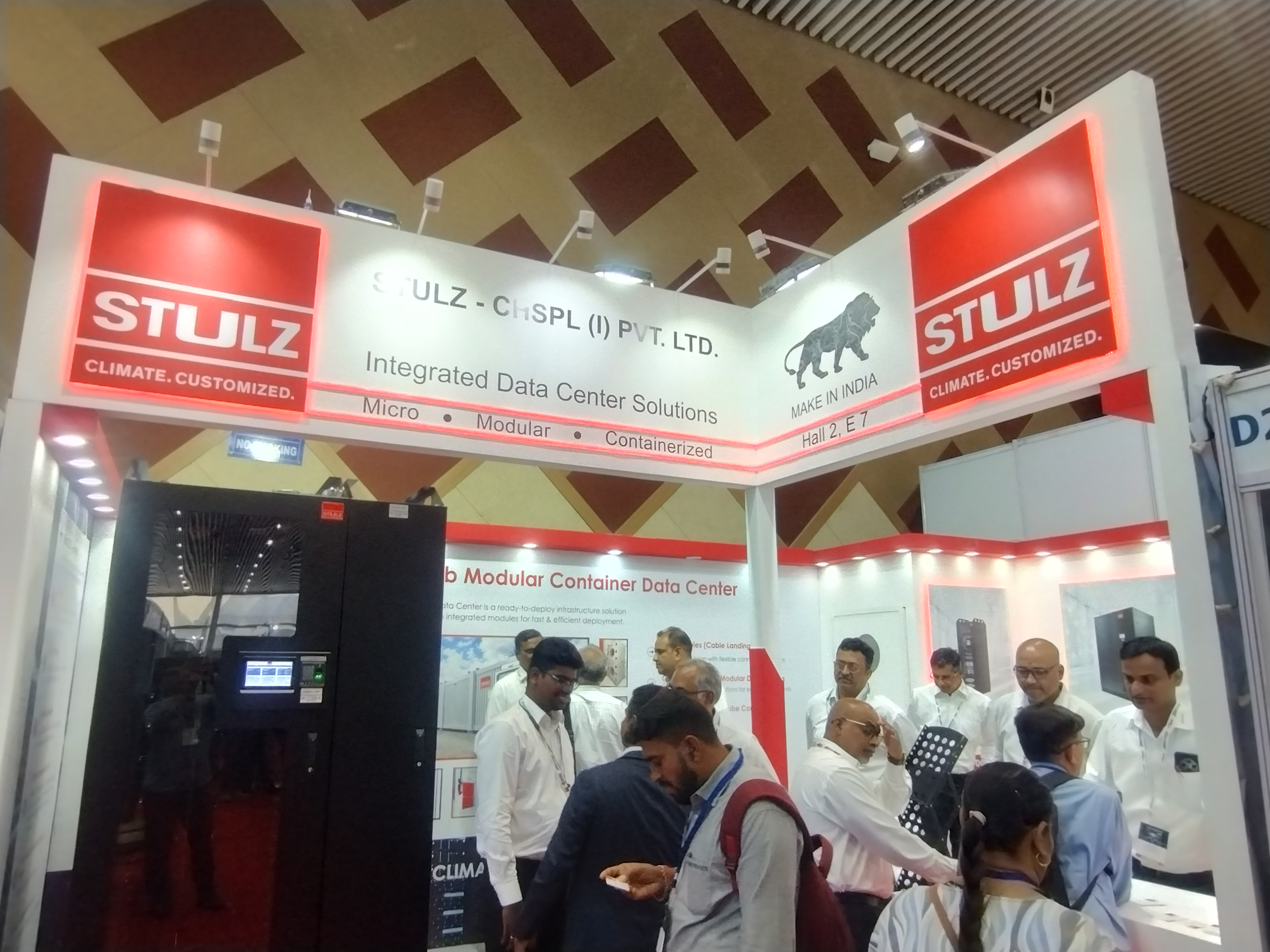
- Stulz at DEF-TECH Bharat 2026, KTPO, Bengaluru
- Type: GmbH & Co. KG
- Industry: Manufacturing
- Founded: 1947 in Hamburg, Germany
- Headquarters: Hamburg, Germany
- Area served: 140 countries
- Products: Air conditioning etc.
- Website: www.stulz.com

Stulz Gmbh is a German worldwide company specializing in air conditioning, thermal management, and cooling solutions for mission-critical infrastructure like data centers.

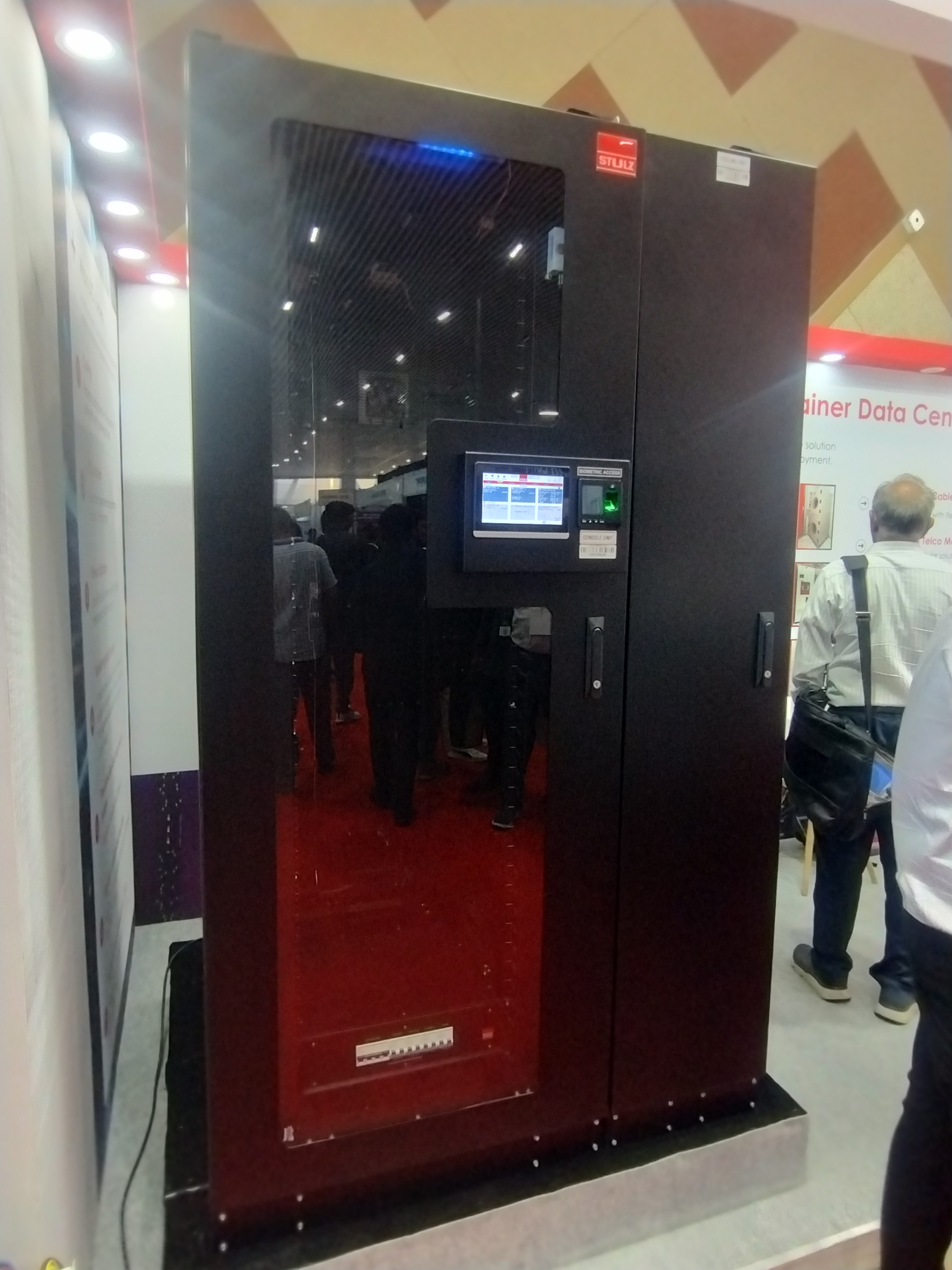
A Stulz air conditioner at DEF-TECH Bharat 2026

== Company ==
Stulz was founded in 1947 in Hamburg, Germany.
