= General Hospital (disambiguation) =

General Hospital is an American TV soap opera broadcast since 1963.

General Hospital may also refer to:

- General hospital, an acute-care hospital

== Arts and entertainment ==
- General Hospital (British TV series), a TV soap opera 1972–1979
- "General Hospital" (Blackadder), a 1989 episode of the British series Blackadder Goes Forth
- "General Hospital", a song by Alcatrazz from the 1983 album No Parole from Rock 'n' Roll

== People ==
- Brigadier General Ralph Hospital (1891–1972), United States Army officer

== See also ==
- Hospital (disambiguation)
- General Hospital of Mexico, in Mexico City
- General Hospital of Paris, in France during the 16th–18th centuries
