= Hospital station =

Hospital station or Hospital Station may refer to:

== Transportation ==
- Hospital station (Medellín), Colombia
- Hospital metro station (Monterrey), Mexico
- Hospital metro station (Valparaíso), Chile
- Hospitales metro station (Santiago), Chile
- Hospital (TransMilenio), Bogotá, Colombia
- Hospital (Mexibús), State of Mexico, Mexico
- Hospitales (Buenos Aires Underground), Argentina
- Sri Sathya Sai Hospital metro station (Purple Line (Namma Metro)), Bangalore, India
- City Hospital railway station, in Belfast

== Other uses ==
- Hospital Station, a 1962 science fiction book by James White

== See also ==
- Hospital General (disambiguation)
- Hospital (disambiguation)
