= Hospital General =

Hospital General may refer to:

- Hospital General (Barcelona–Vallès Line), a railway station in Spain
- Hospital General metro station (Mexico City), Mexico
  - Hospital General, a bus station on the Mexico City Metrobús Line 3

== See also ==
- Hospital station (disambiguation)
