= Tsubuku Station =

Railway station in Kurume, Fukuoka Prefecture, Japan

Tsubuku Station 津福駅
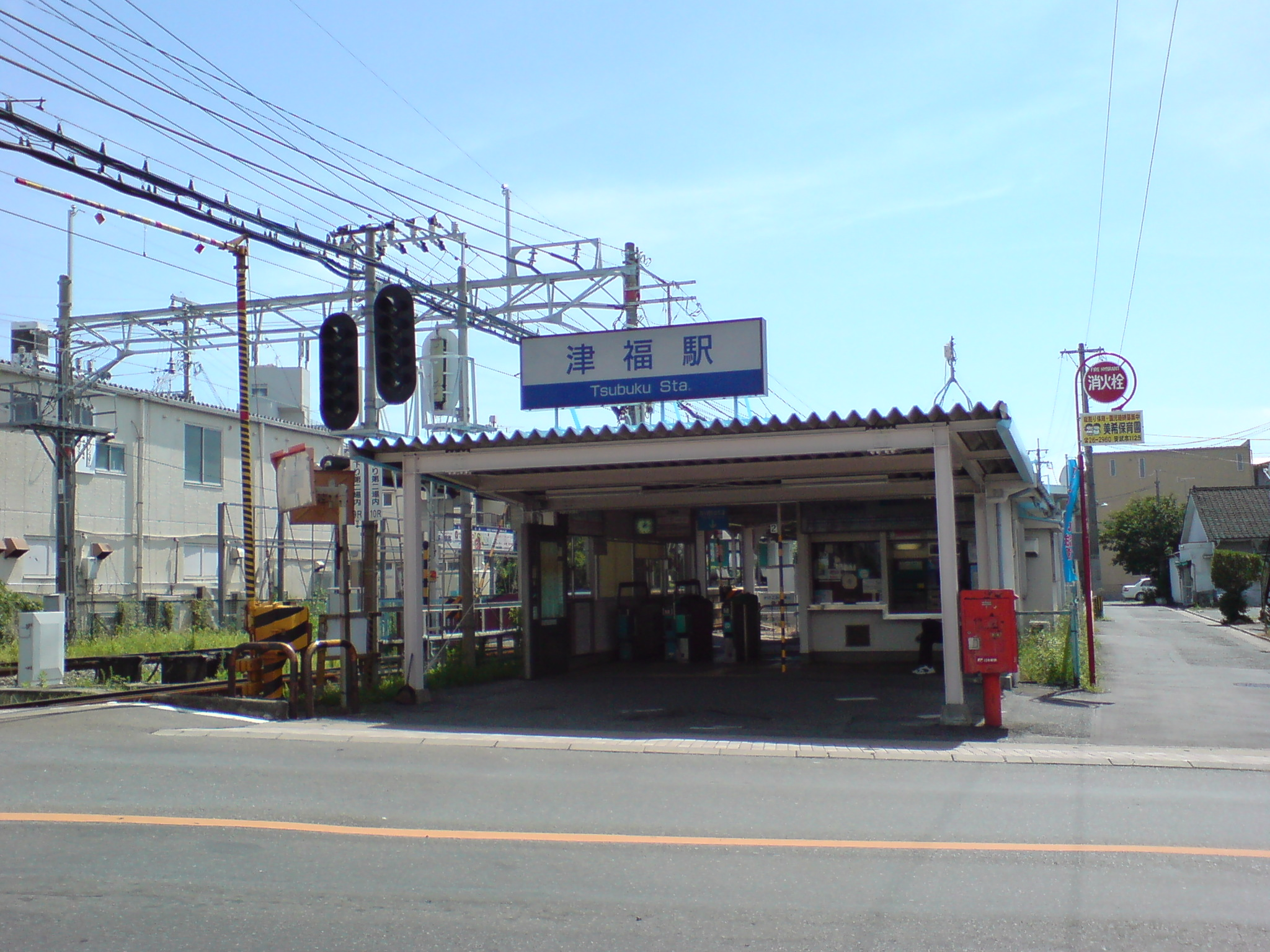
- Tsubuku Station building

General information
- Location: Tsubukuhonmachi, Kurume-shi, Fukuoka-ken 830-0047; Japan
- Coordinates: 33°17′50.09″N 130°29′54.03″E
- Operator: Nishi-Nippon Railroad
- Line: ■ Tenjin Ōmuta Line
- Distance: 41.4 km from Nishitetsu Fukuoka (Tenjin)
- Platforms: 1 island platform
- Connections

Construction
- Structure type: At-grade

Other information
- Status: Staffed
- Station code: T30
- Website: Official website

History
- Opened: 1 November 1921

Passengers
- FY2022: 2100

Services
Preceding station	Nishitetsu	Following station
St. Mary's Hospital towards Nishitetsu Fukuoka (Tenjin)	Tenjin Ōmuta Line Local	Yasutake towards Ōmuta
Location
- Location within Fukuoka Prefecture Location within Japan

Tsubuku Station (津福駅, Tsubuku-eki) is a passenger railway station located in the city of Kurume, Fukuoka, Japan. It is operated by the private transportation company Nishi-Nippon Railroad (NNR), and has station number T30.

== Lines ==
The station is served by the Nishitetsu Tenjin Ōmuta Line and is 41.4 kilometers from the starting point of the line at Nishitetsu Fukuoka (Tenjin) Station.

== Station layout ==
The station consists of a one island platform connected to the station building by a level crossing. The station is staffed.

== Platforms ==
1	■ Tenjin Ōmuta Line	for Nishitetsu Yanagawa and Ōmuta
2	■ Tenjin Ōmuta Line	for Nishitetsu Kurume, Nishitetsu Futsukaichi and Fukuoka

== History ==
The station opened on 1 November 1921 as a station on the Okawa Railway. TIn 1937, the Okawa Railway merged with the Kyushu Railway and the line was electrified and incorporated into the Omuta Line. The company merged with the Kyushu Electric Tramway on 19 September 1942. The company changed its name to Nishi-Nippon Railway three days later, on 22 September 1942.

== Passenger statistics ==
In fiscal 2022, the station was used by 2100 passengers daily.

== Surrounding area ==
- Kurume Tsubukuhonmachi Post Office
- Tsubuku Community Center
- Tsubuku Elementary School
- Kyushu Electric Industry
- Kimuraya Kurume Factory
- Tsubuku Housing Complex
- Tsubukuhonmachi Bus Stop (Nishitetsu Bus)

== See also ==
- List of railway stations in Japan
