= Aki Station =

Railway station in Aki, Kōchi Prefecture, Japan

Aki Station 安芸駅
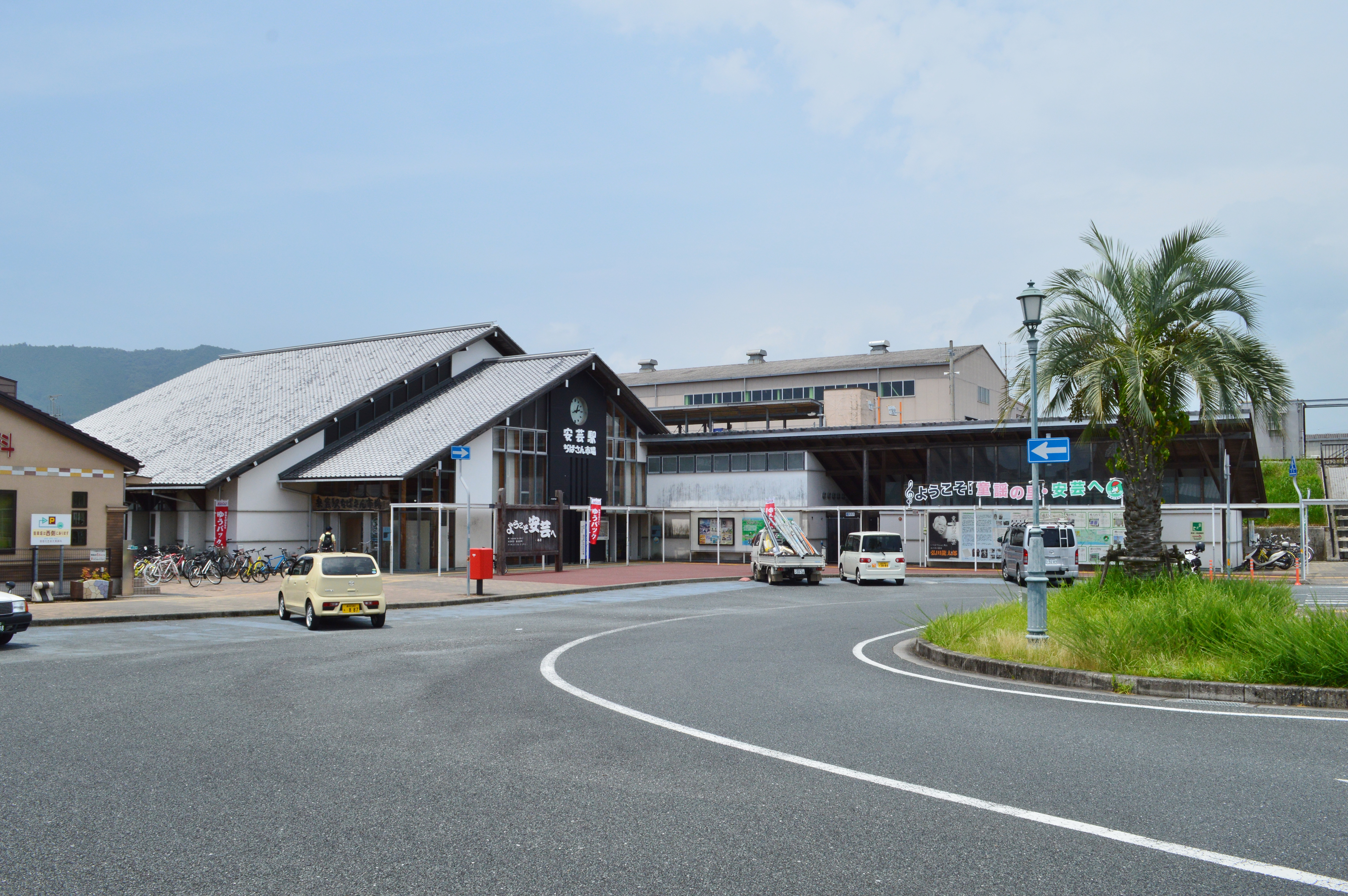
- Aki Station in 2016

General information
- Location: 4-2 Yanomaru, Aki-shi, Kōchi-ken 784-0001; Japan
- Coordinates: 33°30′17″N 133°54′23″E
- Operator: Tosa Kuroshio Railway
- Line: ■ Asa Line
- Distance: 27.7 km from Gomen
- Platforms: 1 island platform
- Tracks: 2 + numerous sidings

Construction
- Structure type: Embankment
- Parking: Available
- Cycle facilities: Bike shed, bike rentals
- Accessible: Yes - elevator to island platform

Other information
- Status: Staffed ticket window, also JR Shikoku (Midori no Madoguchi)
- Station code: GN27
- Website: Official website

History
- Opened: 1 July 2002

Passengers
- FY2011: 1,053 daily
Location
- Location within Kochi Prefecture Location within Japan

Aki Station (安芸駅, Aki-eki) is a passenger railway station located in the city of Aki, Kōchi Prefecture, Japan. It is operated by the third-sector Tosa Kuroshio Railway with the station number "GN27".

== Lines ==
The station is served by the Asa Line and is located 27.7 km from the beginning of the line at Gomen. It is the main station and depot for the Asa Line and all trains, both rapid and local, stop at the station.

== Layout ==
The station consists of an island platform serving two tracks on an embankment. Numerous sidings which form the Asa Line depot are located north of the main tracks. The station building is located at the base of the embankment and houses a waiting area, a local produce market and a staffed ticket window. Besides tickets for the line, the ticket window is also equipped with a JR Shikoku (Midori no Madoguchi) facility and can accept reservations and sell tickets for JR trains. Access to the island platform is by means of an underpass leading to a flight of steps and an elevator. A bike shed and bike rentals are available.

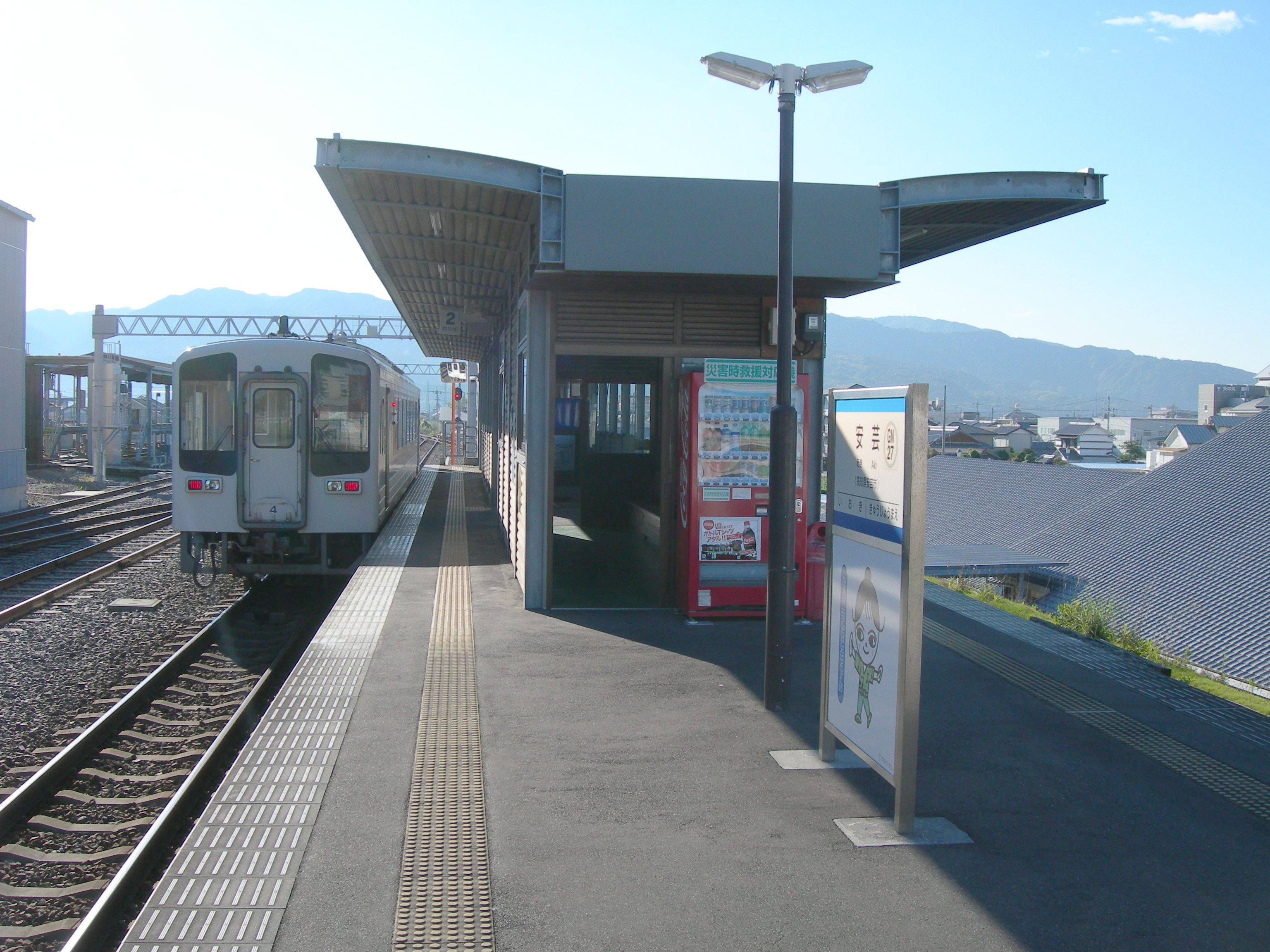
A view of the station platform and tracks in 2010

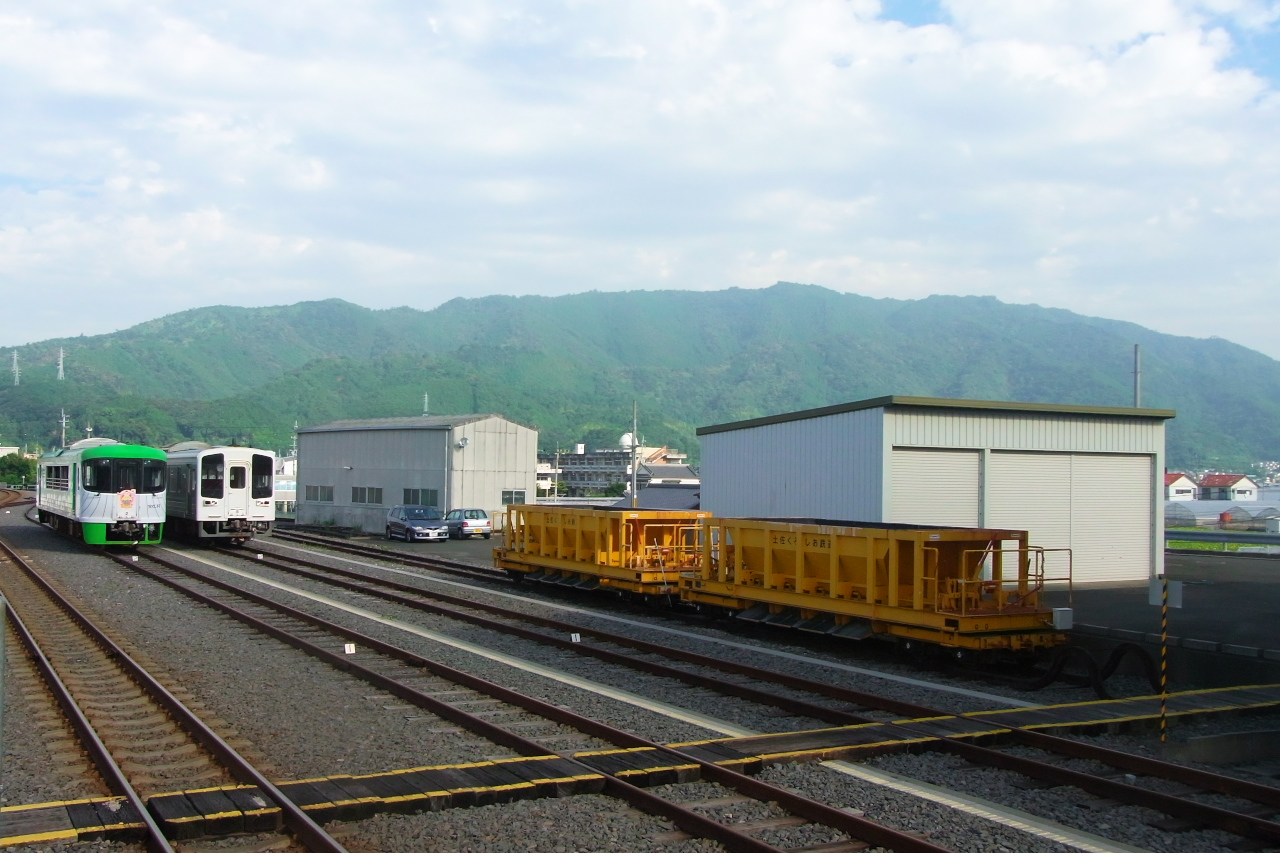
A view of the depot to the north of the station with its many sidings

== Adjacent stations ==
«	Service	»
Asa Line
Aki-Sogo-byoin-mae	Rapid	Ioki
Aki-Sogo-byoin-mae	Local	Ioki

== Station mascot ==
Each station on the Asa Line features a cartoon mascot character designed by Takashi Yanase, a local cartoonist from Kōchi Prefecture. The mascot for Aki Station is a figure of a singer with music note motifs on her costume named Aki Utako-chan (あき うたこちゃん). The music theme relates to Ryūtarō Hirota, a Japanese composer who was born in Aki.

== History ==
The station was opened on 1 July 2002 by the Tosa Kuroshio Railway as an intermediate station on its track from Gomen to Nahari.

== Passenger statistics ==
In fiscal 2011, the station was used by an average of 1,053 passengers daily.

== Surrounding area ==
- Aki Station Jibasan Market – a produce market housed within the station building selling local foodstuffs and souvenirs
- Aki City Hall

== See also ==
- List of railway stations in Japan
