= L'Hôpital =

L'Hôpital (French, 'The Hospital') may refer to:

== Places ==
- Lhôpital, Ain department, France
- L'Hôpital, Moselle, France

== People ==
- Michel de l'Hôpital (1506–1573), French lawyer, diplomat and chancellor
- Nicolas de L'Hôpital (1581–1644), French noble and military leader.
- Guillaume de l'Hôpital (1661–1704), French mathematician
  - L'Hôpital's rule, in mathematics

== See also ==
- Hospital (disambiguation)
- Knights Hospitaller, a Christian order of French knights
