= Hospital (disambiguation) =

A hospital is an institution for health care providing patient treatment with specialized staff and equipment.

Hospital may also refer to:

== People ==
- Juan Hospital (1893–1956), Argentine footballer
- Ralph Hospital (1891–1972), U.S. Army officer
- Janette Turner Hospital (born 1942), Australian novelist

== Places ==
- Hospital, County Limerick, Ireland, a village
- Hospital (district), San José province, Costa Rica

== Arts and entertainment ==
=== Literature ===
- Hospital (Litt novel), a 2007 novel by Toby Litt
- Hospital (Han novel), 2016 Chinese novel by Han Song
- Hospital (Rushdi novel), a 2023 novel by Sanya Rushdi
- The Hospital, a 1964 non-fiction book by Jan de Hartog

=== Film and television ===
- Hospital (1970 film), a documentary film
- The Hospital, a 1971 comedy film
- The Hospital (2013 film), a horror film
- The Hospital (Taiwanese TV series), a 2006 Taiwanese TV drama series
- The Hospital (American TV series), an American sketch comedy television series
- "Hospital" (Bluey), a 2018 animated television episode
- "Hospital" (Not Going Out), a 2023 comedy television episode

=== Music ===
- Hospital Records, a British independent record label
- Hospital (album), by Gary Young, 1994
- "Hospital", a song by The Lemonheads from the 1996 album Car Button Cloth
- "Hospital", a song by The Used from the 2007 album Lies for the Liars
- "Hospital", a 1978 song by Jonathan Richman and The Modern Lovers
- "Hospital", a 2007 song by Nephew featuring L.O.C.

== Other uses ==
- The Hospital Club, in London, England

== See also ==
- General Hospital (disambiguation)
- Hospital station (disambiguation)
- L'Hôpital (disambiguation)
- L'Hôpital's rule, or L'Hospital's rule, a mathematical theorem
- Knights Hospitaller, a Catholic military order
