= Aki, Kōchi =

Aki 安芸市
- City
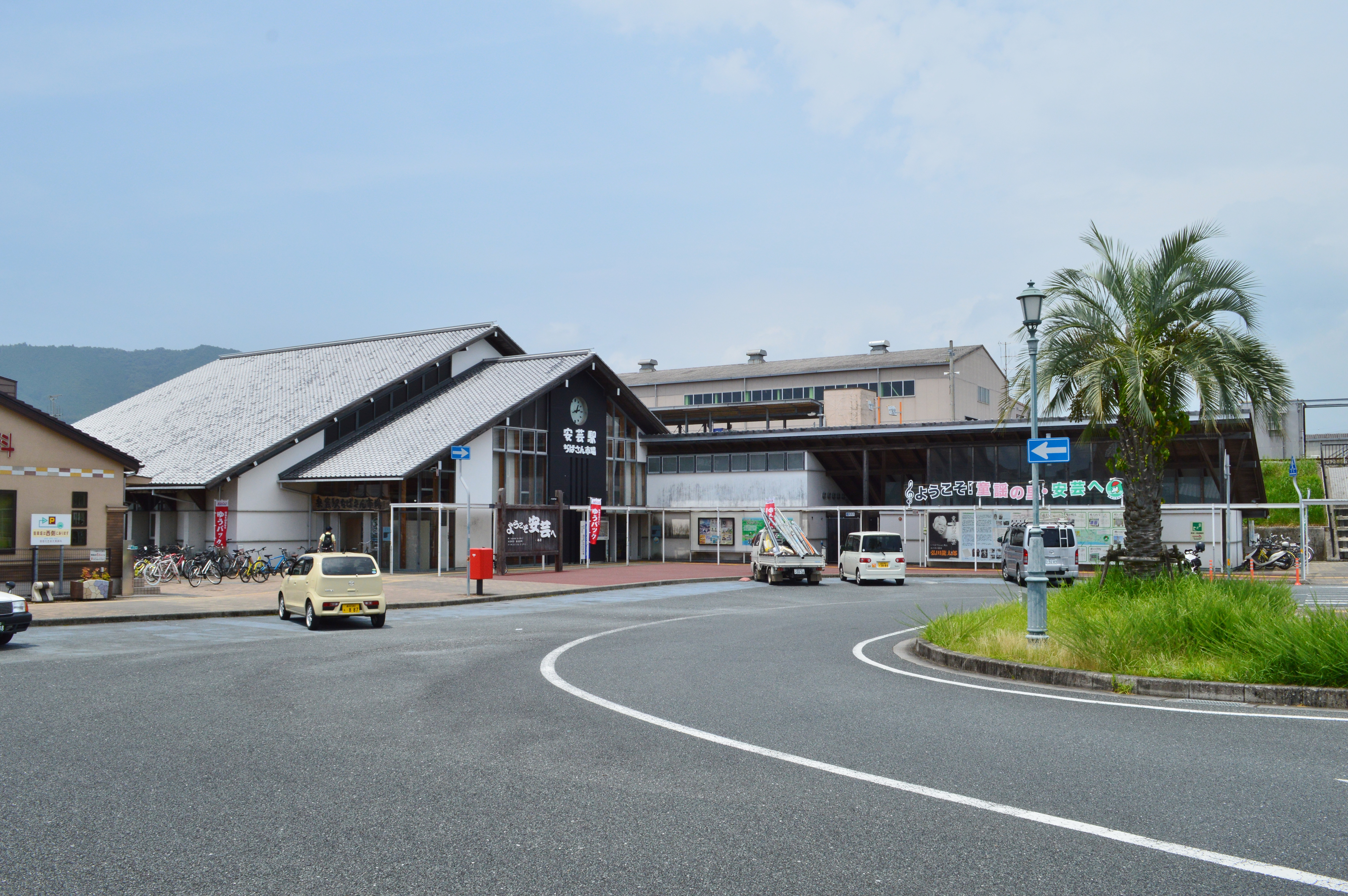
- Aki Station

- Flag Emblem
- Interactive map of Aki
- Location in Japan
- Coordinates: 33°30′N 133°54′E
- Country: Japan
- Region: Shikoku
- Prefecture: Kōchi

Government
  - Mayor: Ikuo Yokoyama

Area
  - Total: 317.21 km^{2} (122.48 sq mi)

Population (July 31, 2022)
  - Total: 16,370
  - Density: 51.61/km^{2} (133.7/sq mi)
- Time zone: UTC+09:00 (JST)
- City hall address: 1-4-40 Yanomaru, Aki-shi, Kōchi-ken 784-8501
- Climate: Cfa
- Website: Official website
- Symbols
- Bird: Grey wagtail
- Flower: Azalea
- Tree: Hinoki

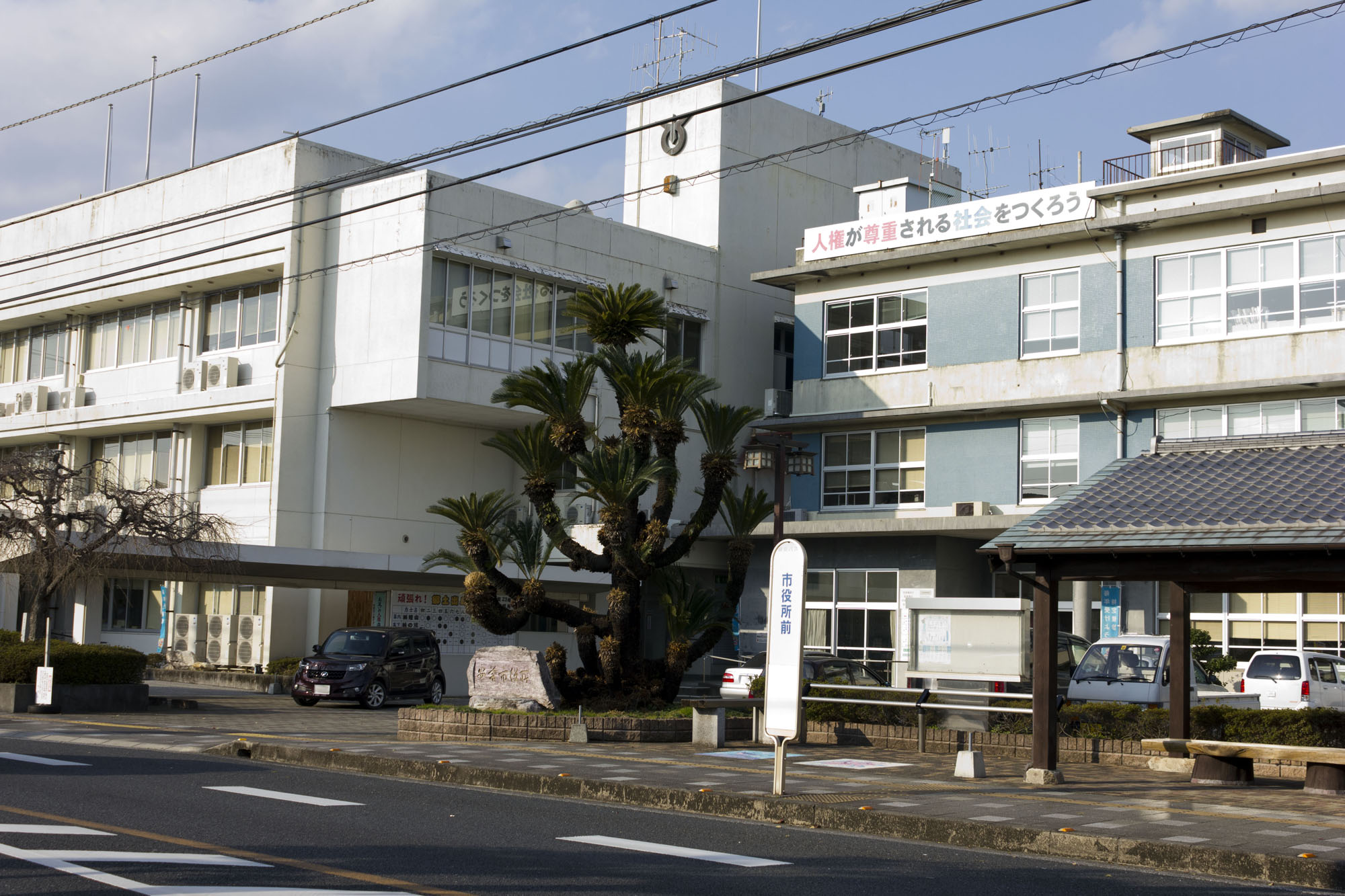
Aki City Hall

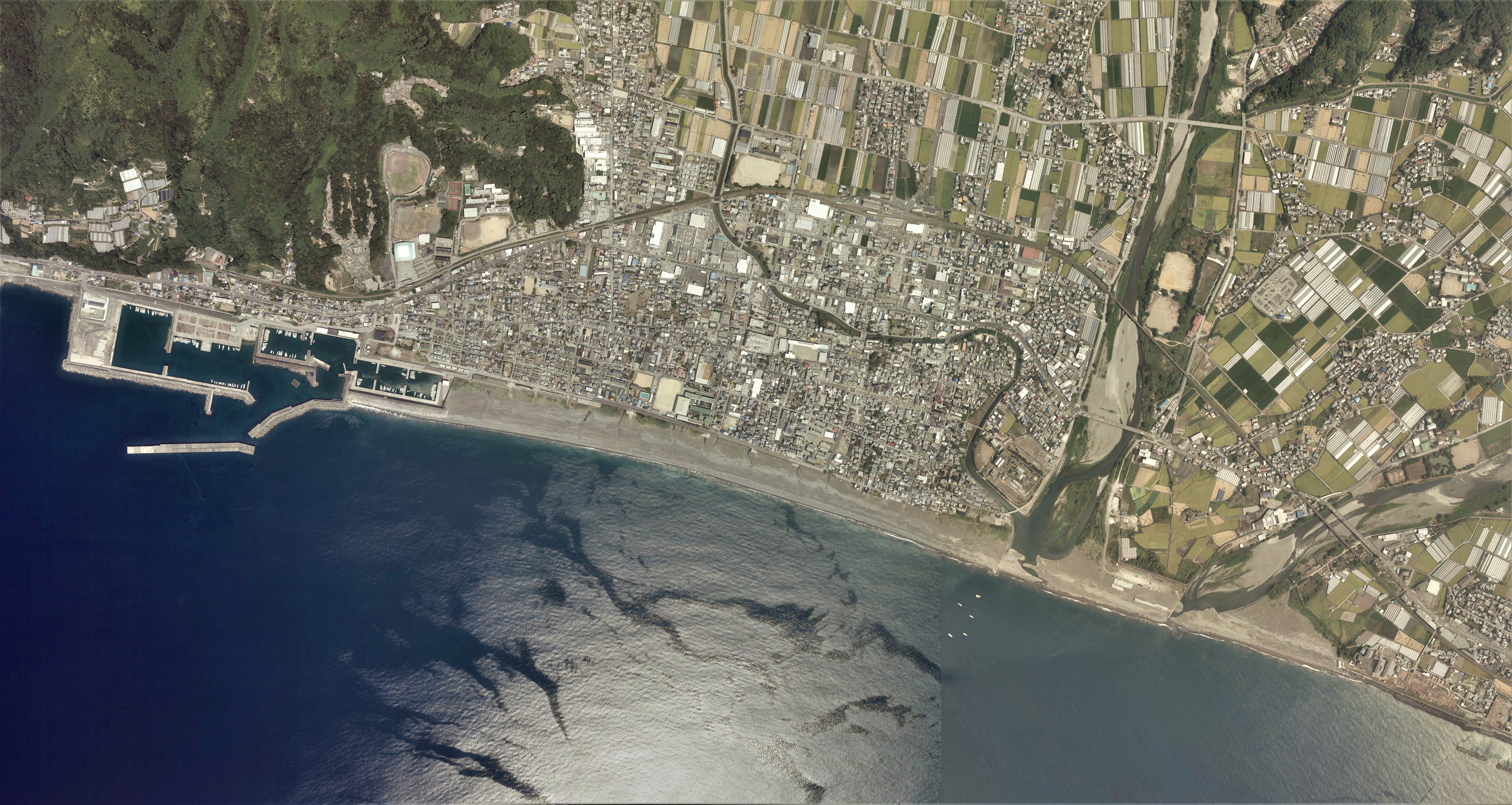
Aerial view of Aki city center

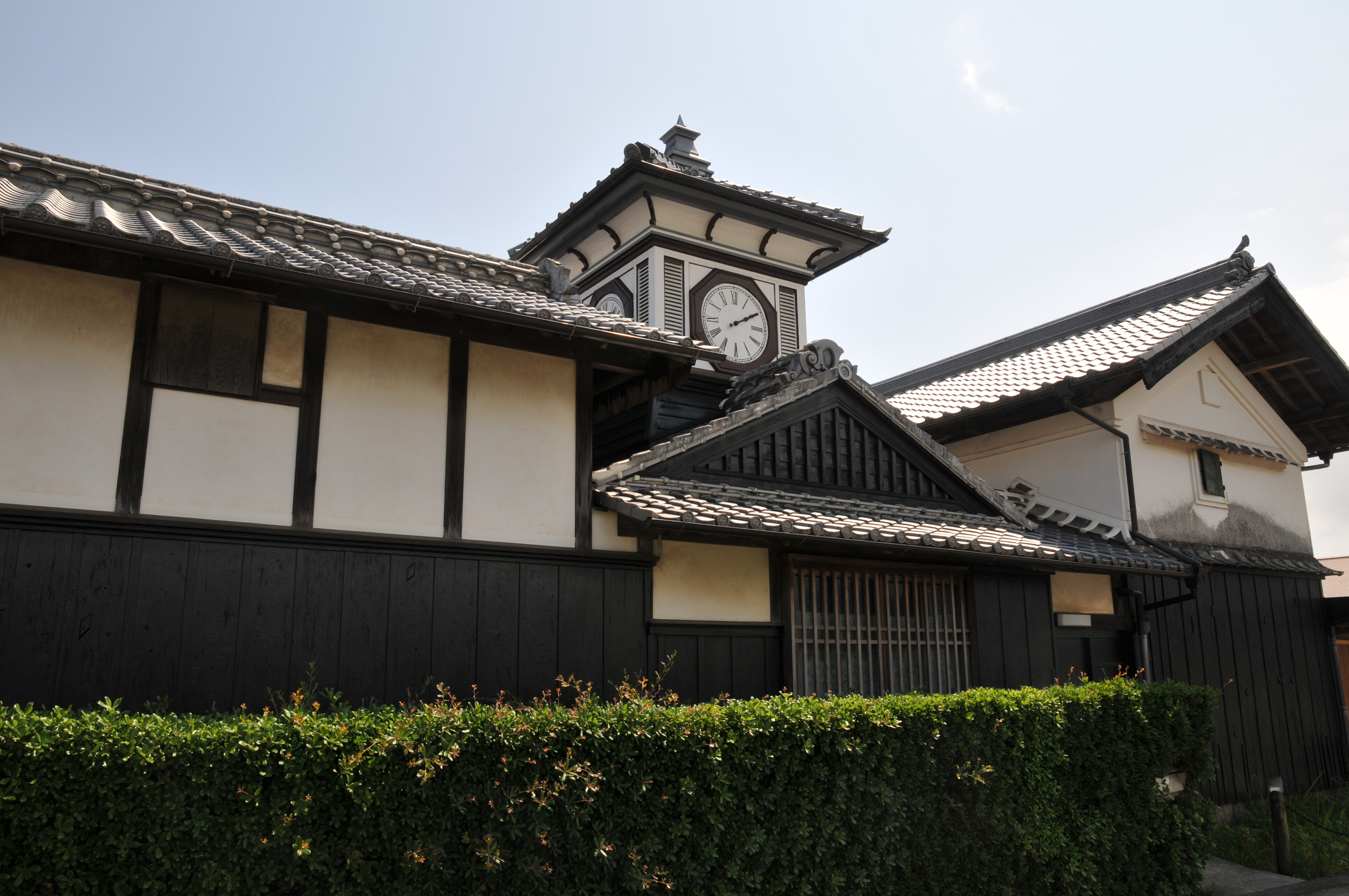
Noradokei Clock

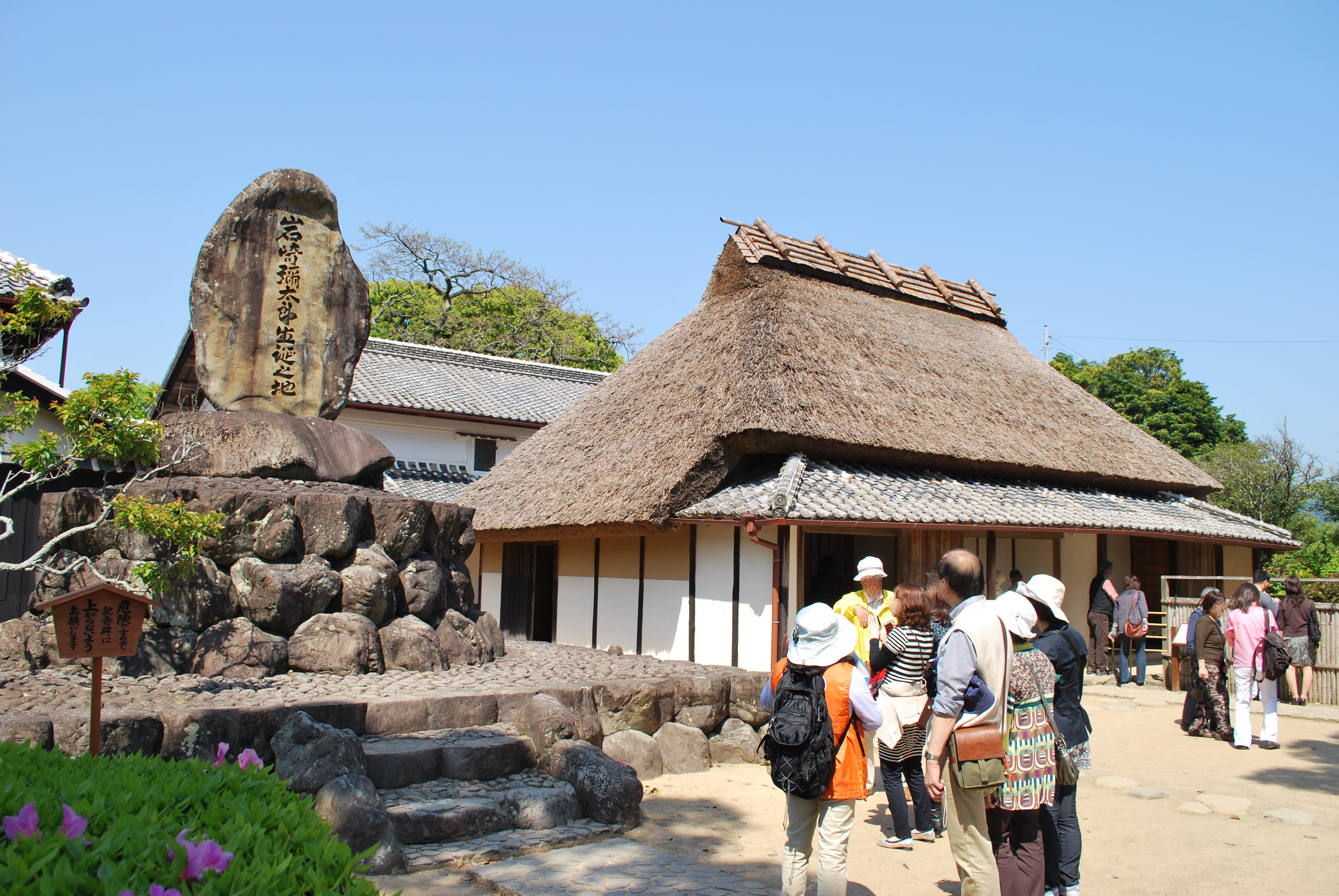
Birthplace of Iwasaki Yataro

Aki (安芸市, Aki-shi) Japanese pronunciation: [ä́.kʲì, ä̀.kʲi̥.ɕì] is a city located in Kōchi Prefecture, Japan. As of 31 July 2022, the city had an estimated population of 16,370 in 8076 households and a population density of 52 persons per km^{2}. The total area of the city is 317.21 square kilometres (122.48 sq mi).

== Geography ==
Aki is located in southeastern Kōchi Prefecture, facing Tosa Bay of the Pacific Ocean to the south and bordered by mountains to the north. The urban area is on the plains of the Aki River.

=== Neighbouring municipalities ===
Kōchi Prefecture

- Geisei
- Kami
- Kōnan
- Umaji
- Yasuda

Tokushima Prefecture

- Naka

=== Climate ===
Aki has a humid subtropical climate (Köppen climate classification Cfa) with hot, humid summers and cool winters. There is significant precipitation throughout the year, especially during June and July. The average annual temperature in Aki is 17.4 °C (63.3 °F). The average annual rainfall is 2,099.5 mm (82.66 in) with June as the wettest month. The temperatures are highest on average in August, at around 27.4 °C (81.3 °F), and lowest in January, at around 7.5 °C (45.5 °F). The highest temperature ever recorded in Aki was 36.5 °C (97.7 °F) on 21 August 2016; the coldest temperature ever recorded was −6.7 °C (19.9 °F) on 26 February 1981.

Climate data for Aki (1991−2020 normals, extremes 1977−present)
Month	Jan	Feb	Mar	Apr	May	Jun	Jul	Aug	Sep	Oct	Nov	Dec	Year
Record high °C (°F)	21.1 (70.0)	21.9 (71.4)	24.6 (76.3)	27.2 (81.0)	29.7 (85.5)	31.5 (88.7)	35.7 (96.3)	36.5 (97.7)	34.6 (94.3)	31.9 (89.4)	27.4 (81.3)	23.7 (74.7)	36.5 (97.7)
Mean daily maximum °C (°F)	12.2 (54.0)	13.0 (55.4)	15.9 (60.6)	20.0 (68.0)	23.7 (74.7)	26.0 (78.8)	29.6 (85.3)	31.2 (88.2)	28.8 (83.8)	24.5 (76.1)	19.5 (67.1)	14.4 (57.9)	21.6 (70.8)
Daily mean °C (°F)	7.5 (45.5)	8.4 (47.1)	11.5 (52.7)	15.9 (60.6)	19.8 (67.6)	22.7 (72.9)	26.4 (79.5)	27.4 (81.3)	24.8 (76.6)	20.1 (68.2)	14.9 (58.8)	9.8 (49.6)	17.4 (63.4)
Mean daily minimum °C (°F)	3.3 (37.9)	4.0 (39.2)	7.0 (44.6)	11.6 (52.9)	15.9 (60.6)	19.7 (67.5)	23.6 (74.5)	24.3 (75.7)	21.5 (70.7)	16.3 (61.3)	10.8 (51.4)	5.6 (42.1)	13.6 (56.5)
Record low °C (°F)	−4.4 (24.1)	−6.7 (19.9)	−2.3 (27.9)	1.9 (35.4)	7.4 (45.3)	13.3 (55.9)	17.1 (62.8)	17.7 (63.9)	12.7 (54.9)	7.1 (44.8)	1.2 (34.2)	−2.1 (28.2)	−6.7 (19.9)
Average precipitation mm (inches)	58.7 (2.31)	91.6 (3.61)	146.9 (5.78)	174.7 (6.88)	191.8 (7.55)	305.3 (12.02)	273.8 (10.78)	216.7 (8.53)	292.1 (11.50)	166.3 (6.55)	107.5 (4.23)	74.1 (2.92)	2,099.5 (82.66)
Average precipitation days (≥ 1.0 mm)	6.0	7.1	10.3	9.9	10.1	13.9	12.0	10.7	11.4	9.1	7.3	6.0	113.8
Mean monthly sunshine hours	193.0	181.0	197.5	202.9	203.3	137.8	194.6	232.9	170.0	183.1	175.0	189.9	2,260.9
Source: Japan Meteorological Agency

== Demographics ==
Per Japanese census data, the population of Aki in 2020 is 16,243 people. Aki has been conducting censuses since 1950.

Historical population
Year	Pop.	±%
1950	31,158	—
1955	29,841	−4.2%
1960	30,370	+1.8%
1965	26,605	−12.4%
1970	24,498	−7.9%
1975	24,480	−0.1%
1980	25,022	+2.2%
1985	25,009	−0.1%
1990	23,739	−5.1%
1995	22,377	−5.7%
2000	21,321	−4.7%
2005	20,348	−4.6%
2010	19,547	−3.9%
2015	17,577	−10.1%
2020	16,243	−7.6%
Aki population statistics

== History ==
As with all of Kōchi Prefecture, the area of Aki was part of ancient Tosa Province. During the Edo period, the area was part of the holdings of Tosa Domain ruled by the Yamauchi clan from their seat at Kōchi Castle. Following the Meiji restoration, the village of Aki was established within Aki District, Kōchi with the creation of the modern municipalities system on October 1, 1889. Aki was elevated to town status on November 21, 1895. On August 1, 1954, Aki merged with the villages of Ananai (穴内村), Ioki (伊尾木村), Kawakita (川北村), Higashigawa (東川村), Hatayama (畑山村), Inokuchi (井ノ口村), Doi (土居村), and Akano (赤野村) to form the city of Aki.

== Government ==
Aki has a mayor-council form of government with a directly elected mayor and a unicameral city council of 14 members. Aki, together with the village of Geisei, contributes one member to the Kōchi Prefectural Assembly. In terms of national politics, the city is part of Kōchi 1st district of the lower house of the Diet of Japan.

== Economy ==
Traditionally, forestry and charcoal production were mainstays of the local economy, along with commercial fishing and agriculture. In particular, the city is of the leading eggplant and yuzu production areas in Japan.

== Education ==
Aki has nine public elementary schools and two public middle schools operated by the city government and one public middle school and two public high schools operated by the Kōchi Prefectural Department of Education.

== Transportation ==
=== Railway ===
Tosa Kuroshio Railway - Asa Line

- Akano - Ananai - Kyūjōmae - Aki General Hospital - Aki - Ioki - Shimoyama

=== Highways ===
- Kōchi-Tōbu Expressway
- National Route 55

== Local attractions ==
=== Historical sites ===
- Aki Castle, A castle ruin.
- Ryutaro Hirota's music monuments: There are 10 music monuments, each engraved with a different song of Ryutaro's. They are located all around the city.
- Carillon Clock (カリヨン時計): Large clock monument to Ryutaro Hirota. At certain hours, the clock plays music and has mechanical dolls that come out and dance.
- Noradokei Clock (野良時計): Located in Doi, Aki along Route 213.
- Samurai Residence (武家屋敷): Located in Doi, Aki.
- Sugio Shrine (杉尾神社)
- Iwasaki Yatarō Residence: (founder of Mitsubishi) His childhood home is located in Aki, north of the Aki City Train station off of Route 29 in Inokuchi, Aki.

=== Sites of interest ===
- Aki Station Jiba-San Market (安芸市ぢばさん市場): Located within the station's main building, local produce, plants, bakery goods, Aki City omiyage, and home-made bento are brought/made fresh every day and sold cheaply.
- Aki Dome: This is where the Hanshin Tigers practice in the spring (beginning in February) and play their first game of the season. It draws Hanshin Tigers fans every year from all over Japan. The Dome is located in Sakuragaoka-machi and is visible along Kokudo Route 55. One can also access the Dome by going to Kyūjōmae Station (球場前駅).
- Aki City Calligraphy Museum (安芸市書道美術館): Located in Doi-chō, Aki City along Route 29 next to the History Museum. The museum is a two floor establishment that displays and hosts many different calligraphy exhibitions and contests.
- Aki City History Museum (安芸市歴史民俗資料館): Located in Doi-chō, Aki City along Route 29 next to the Calligraphy Museum. The museum contains information on the evolution of Aki City through history, as well as an extensive history of Iwasaki Yatarou.
- Aki Fishing Port (安芸漁港)
- Arimitsu Brewing Company: A very small sake brewery located in Akano-chō, Aki City (along the border of Geisei Village) that produces sake using traditional methods. Production is minimal and sales are limited to Aki City and select retail stores around Kochi City. The most well-known sake they produce is called "Aki Tora" (安芸虎), which is not named after the Hanshin Tigers but instead, after Kunitora Aki who resided in the Aki Castle.
- Doyo Washroom: The Doyo Washroom is located next to the Aki City Office and is a bathroom known for playing the famous nursery rhymes that were created in Aki City.
- Kikusui Sake Brewing Company (菊水酒造株式会社): Located in Hon-machi, Aki City, is a local sake brewery well known around Shikoku and the second largest producer of sake in Kochi Prefecture. The company constantly comes up with new and innovative products and is sold widely around the prefecture. Along with their constantly updating product list, they are well known for their "Shimantogawa" (四万十川) sake.
- Nasu Park and Uchiharano Park: Located in Uchiharano-Chō, Aki City. Nasu park is known for the playground equipment shaped like vegetables (among which is eggplant). Uchiharano park is a large public park with a man-made lake. In the spring and summer, it is a good place to go for flower viewing while picnicking. Boats may be rented for a row around the lake.
- Uchiharano Pottery Center: This pottery center sells locally made pottery and blown glass art. With an appointment, you can make your own pottery in the studio.

== Culture ==
Aki City is an agricultural city where many farmers reside and thus, is well known for its locally grown eggplant (なす), dekopon, yuzu, and tobacco. It is also well known for a dish called chirimendon (ちりめん丼), a bowl of rice covered in tiny sardines, green onions, and tsuyu sauce.

Every August, Aki City holds a Yosakoi (よさこい) festival and parade in the city. Since Yosakoi dance originated in Kōchi Prefecture, many cities around the prefecture hold smaller-scale festivals in relation to the main three-day Yosakoi festival in Kōchi, which draws groups of performers from all over Japan. Aki City's festival is one of the larger festivals held on the east side of Kochi Prefecture, and takes place over two weekends in August. Various groups from around the city, nearby cities, as well as groups from Tokushima Prefecture and Ehime Prefecture come and perform in the Aki City Yosakoi festival in preparation for the three-day festival in Kōchi.

Another well-known festival held in Aki City is the Aki City Candle-Light Festival and Illumination Event. This event takes place over two days and is held around the mid-end of December. The festivities take place in front of the Aki City train station where local music groups, junior high school bands, and high school bands perform while various local restaurants set-up stalls to sell food, drinks, and other local products. The event takes place around the birthday of Iwasaki Yatarō and is thus included in the festivities. There is also a very large display of handmade candles set up around the station, and nearby residence often participate by setting up Christmas "illuminations" and elaborate light displays.

Since Kōchi Prefecture is well known for shodo (書道) or calligraphy, the Aki City Calligraphy Museum holds a nationwide calligraphy contest every May, and another contest for high school students every July/August. Calligraphy from all over Japan is sent in to be judged by highly regarded calligraphy teachers from the prefecture, and later displayed in a public exhibition. Along with this contest, Aki City also holds a general arts (photography, painting, drawing, sculpture, wood-work) contest every September/October in the Aki City Shuminkaikan.

Other than these larger events, Aki City is also the host to various small festivals, local music performances, art exhibitions, and events. In addition, every November, Aki City is host to the "Turtle Marathon," a marathon held for people ages 30 and over from all over Japan.
