= Ioki Station =

Railway station in Aki, Kōchi Prefecture, Japan

Ioki Station 伊尾木駅
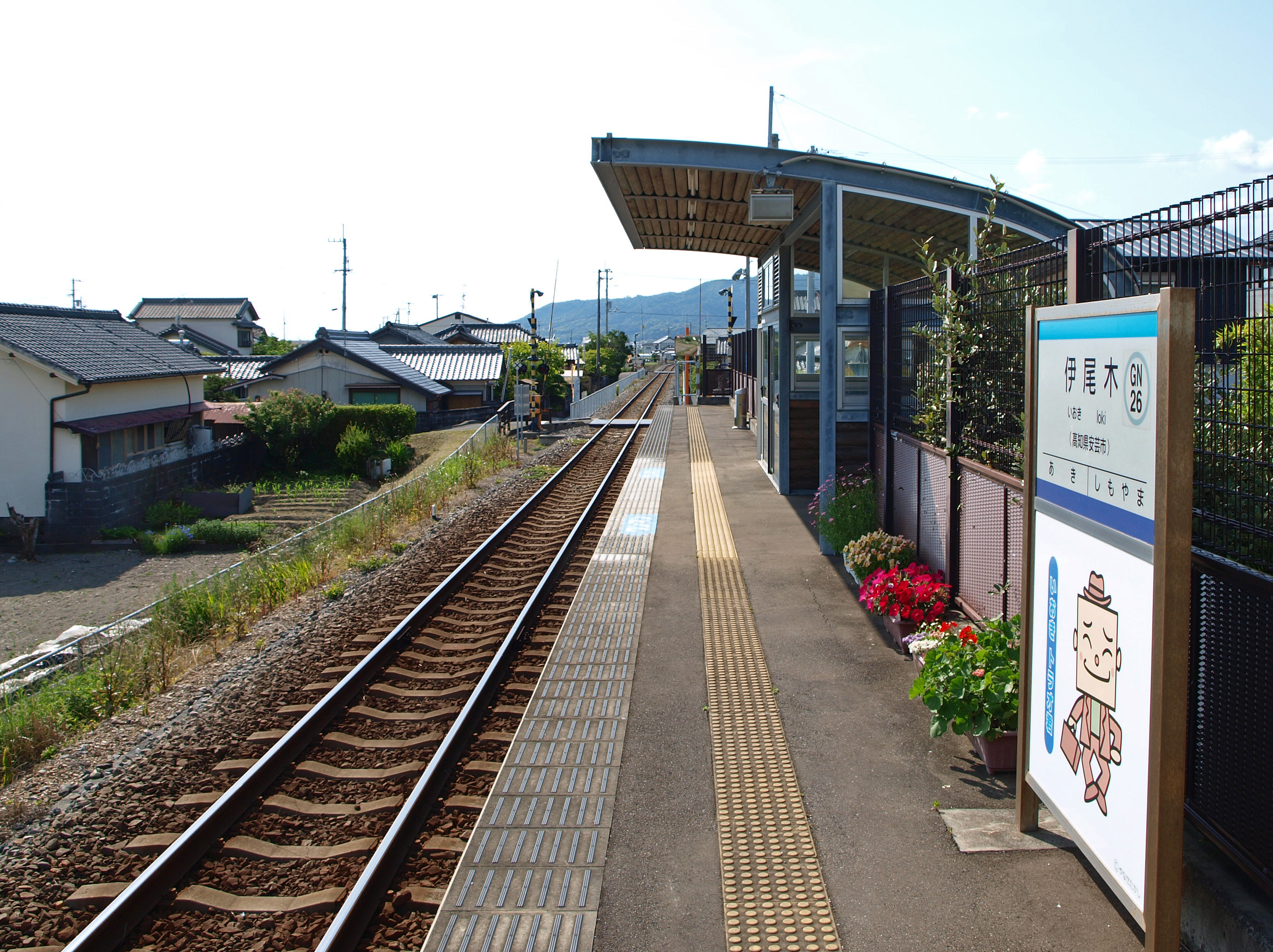
- Ioki Station in 2010

General information
- Location: Ioki, Aki-shi, Kōchi-ken 784-0045; Japan
- Coordinates: 33°29′27″N 133°55′45″E
- Operator: Tosa Kuroshio Railway
- Line: ■ Asa Line
- Distance: 30.4 km from Gomen
- Platforms: 1 side platform
- Tracks: 1

Construction
- Structure type: At grade
- Cycle facilities: Bike shed
- Accessible: Yes - ramp to platform

Other information
- Status: Unstaffed
- Station code: GN26

History
- Opened: 1 July 2002

Passengers
- FY2011: 57 daily
Location
- Location within Kochi Prefecture Location within Japan

Ioki Station (伊尾木駅, Ioki-eki) is a passenger railway station located in the city of Aki, Kōchi Prefecture, Japan. It is operated by the third-sector Tosa Kuroshio Railway with the station number "GN26".

== Lines ==
The station is served by the Asa Line and is located 30.4 km from the beginning of the line at Gomen. All Asa Line trains, rapid and local, stop at the station except for those which start or end their trips at Aki.

== Layout ==
The station consists of a side platform serving a single track at grade. There is no station building but a shelter comprising both an enclosed and an open compartment has been set up on the platform. A separate waiting room and bicycle shed, both built of timber, have been set up next to the ramp which leads to the platform from the station forecourt.

== Adjacent stations ==
«	Service	»
Asa Line
Aki	Rapid	Shimoyama
Aki	Local	Shimoyama

== Station mascot ==
Each station on the Asa Line features a cartoon mascot character designed by Takashi Yanase, a local cartoonist from Kōchi Prefecture. The mascot for Ioki Station is a figure dressed in a business suit and hat with a box for a head and holding a briefcase. His name is Ioki Torao-kun (いおき トラオ君) and is inspired by the character "Tora-san" (寅さん) from the popular film series Otoko wa Tsurai yo. One title from the series about the traveling salesman Tora-san was to have been shot in Ioki for release in 1996 but was cancelled because of the death of the actor Kiyoshi Atsumi.

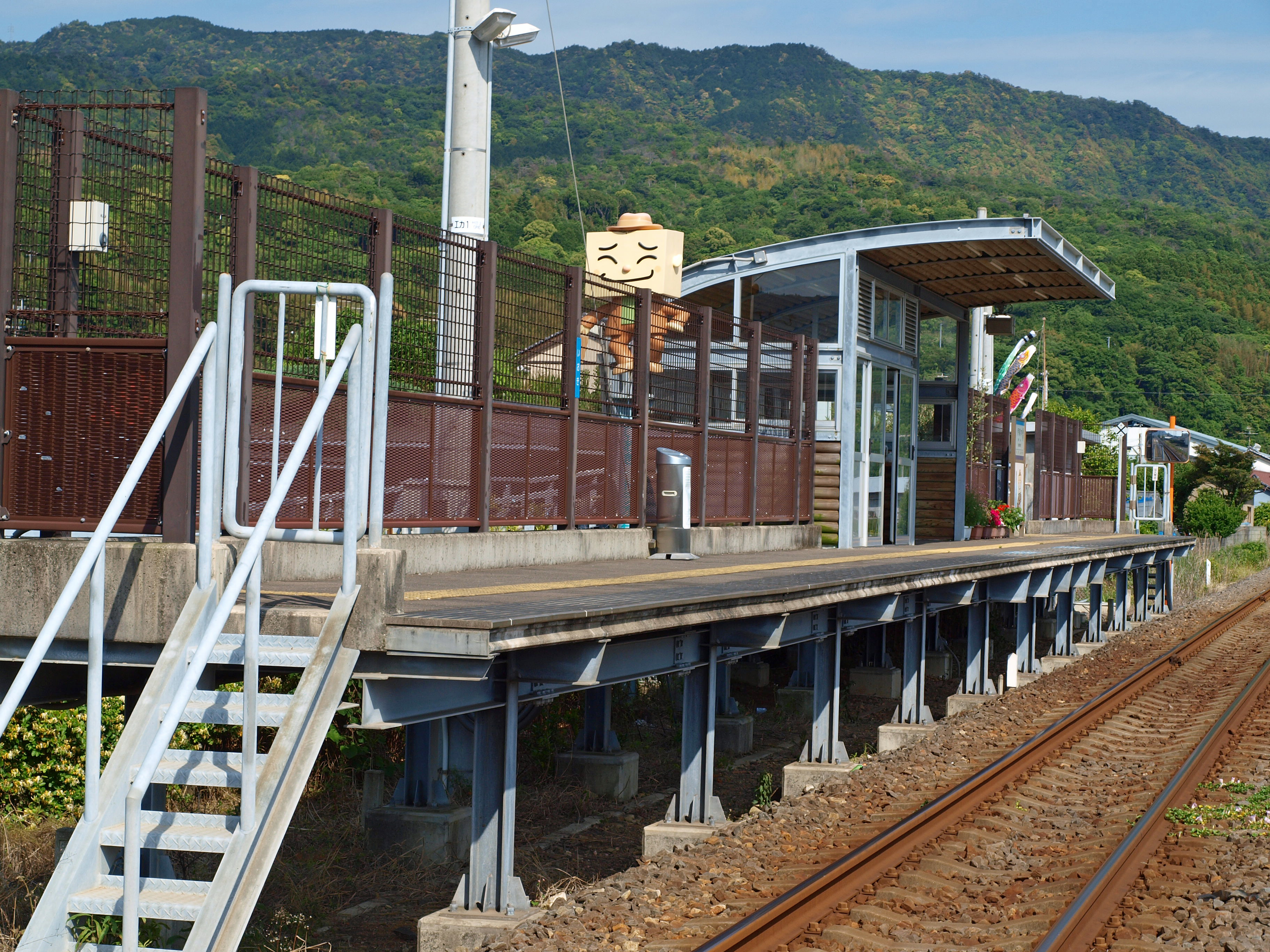
A statue of Torao-kun is located at the station entrance.

== History ==
The train station was opened on 1 July 2002 by the Tosa Kuroshio Railway as an intermediate station on its track from Gomen to Nahari.

== Passenger statistics ==
In fiscal 2011, the station was used by an average of 77 passengers daily.

== Surrounding area ==
The station is located in a residential area.

== See also ==
- List of railway stations in Japan
