= KTPO Exhibition and Convention Centre, Bangalore =

Building in Whitefield, India

KTPO Exhibition and Convention Centre
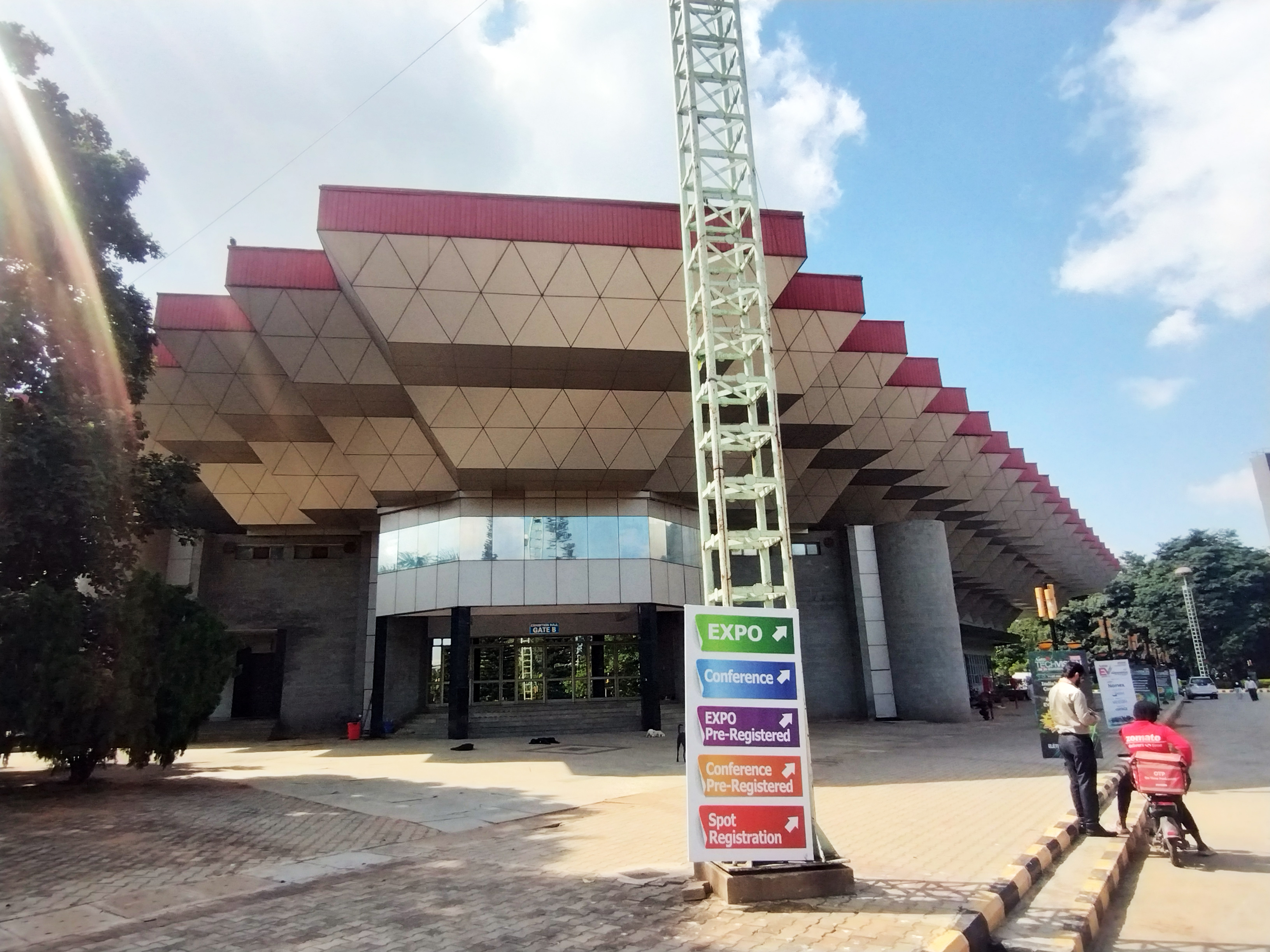
- An exhibition hall inside KTPO, in 2025

- Location within India Location within Asia
- Address: Export Promotion Industrial Park Plot Number 121, Road #Ⅴ, EPIP 2nd phase, Industrial area, Whitefield, Bangalore, Karnataka 560066; Bangalore; India
- Location: Whitefield, Bengaluru
- Coordinates: 12.981076°N 77.71856°E
- Owner: Karnataka Trade Promotion Organization (KTPO), Government of Karnataka
- Type: Exhibition and convention centre
- Public transit: Nallurhalli metro station
- Parking: Yes (all type of vehicles)

Construction
- Built: 2000
- Opened: 2004

Website
- Official website

KTPO Exhibition and Convention Centre is located in Whitefield, Bengaluru, India. It is run by Karnataka Trade Promotion Organization (KTPO) of Government of Karnataka.

== Media gallery ==
Exhibitions in KTPO Exhibition and Convention Centre
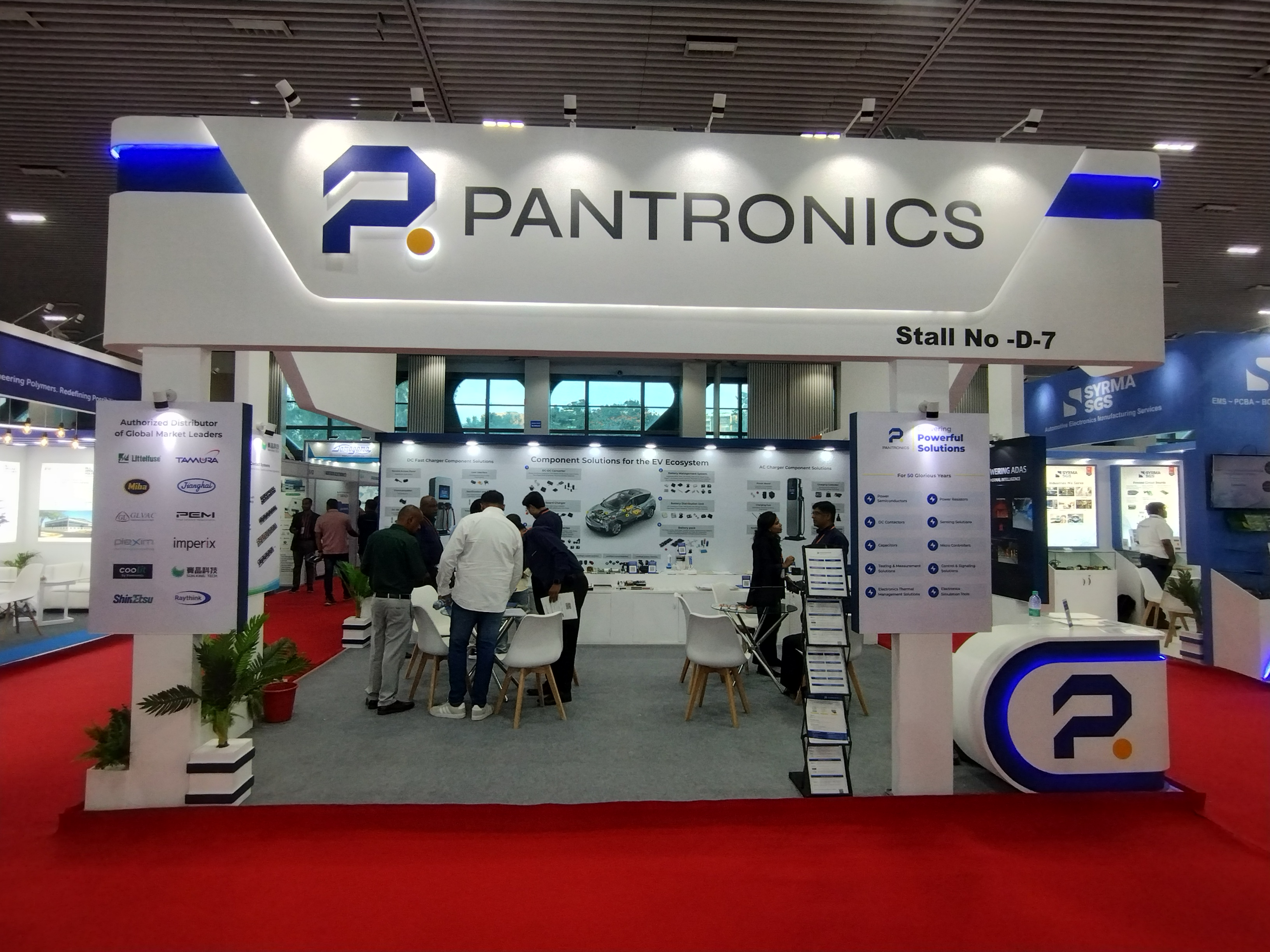

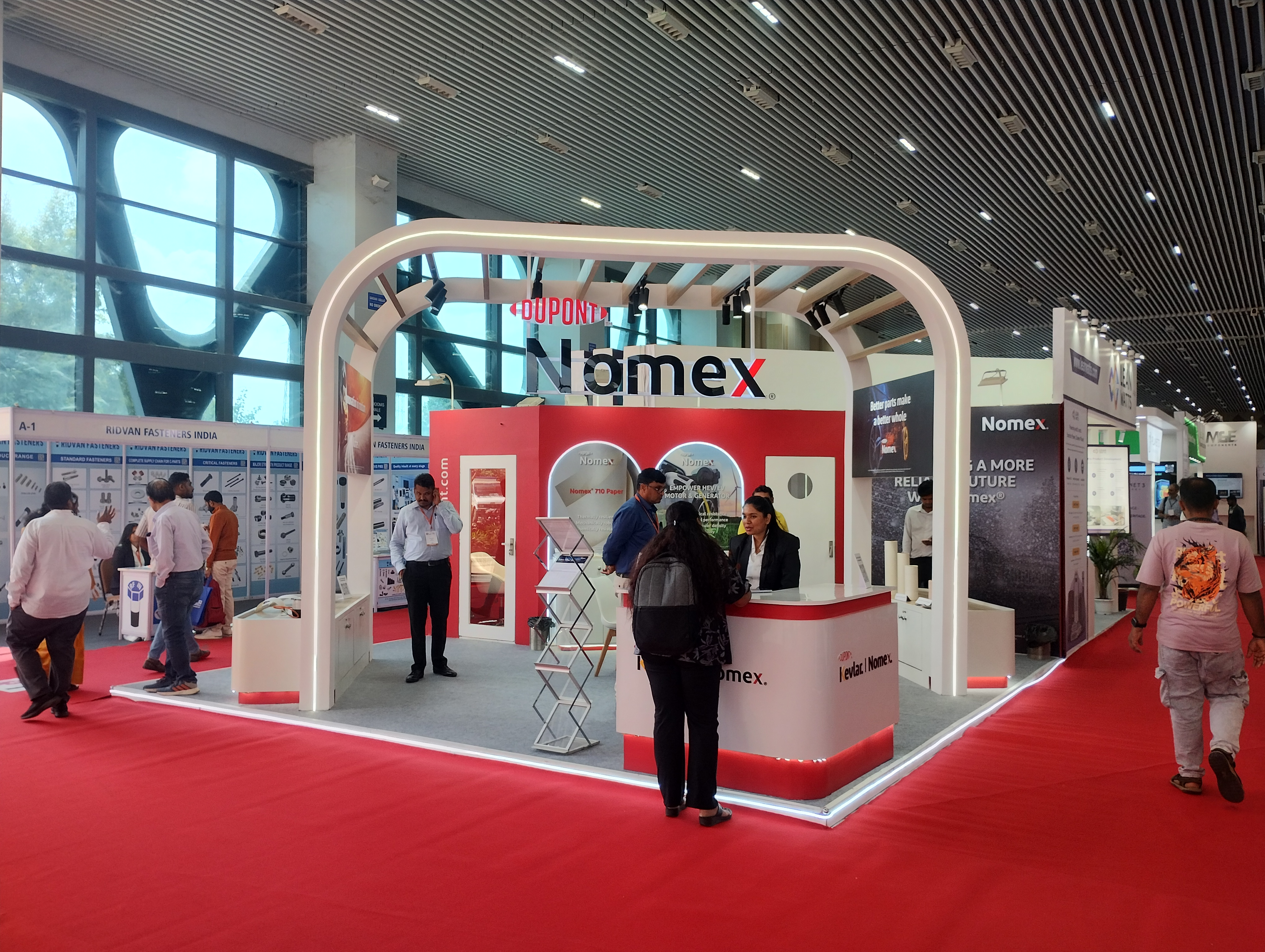

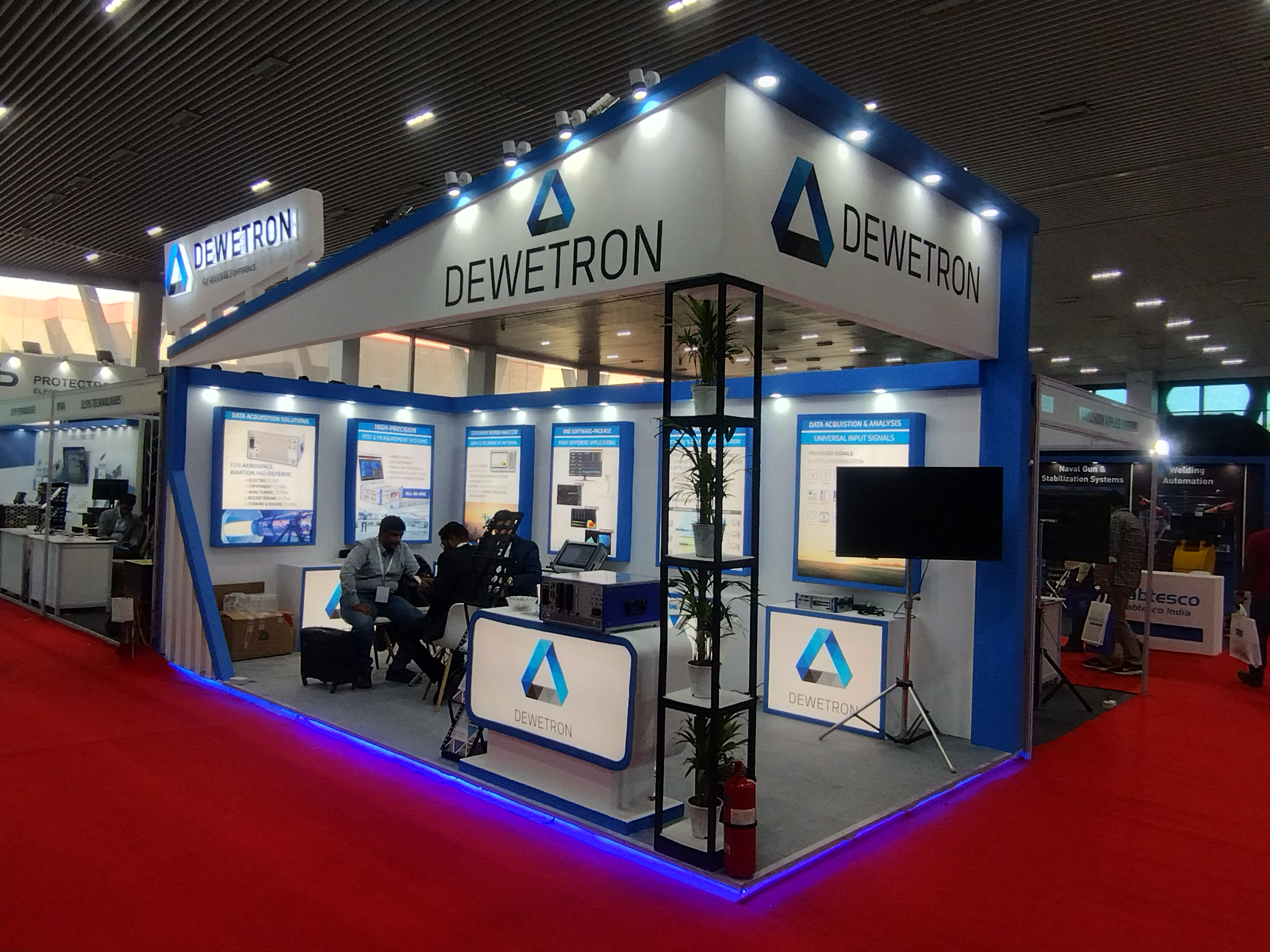

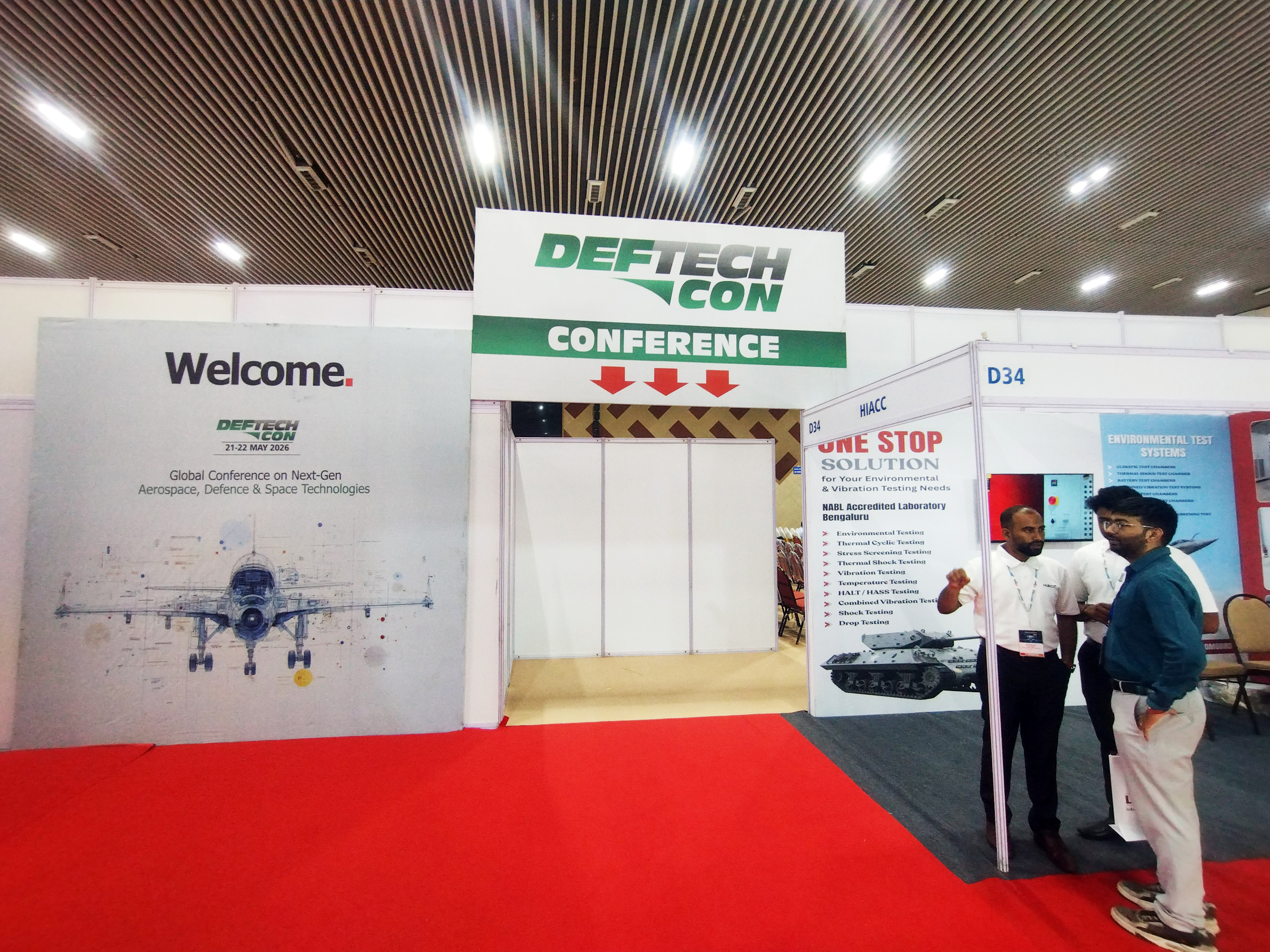
KTPO Exhibition and Convention Centre
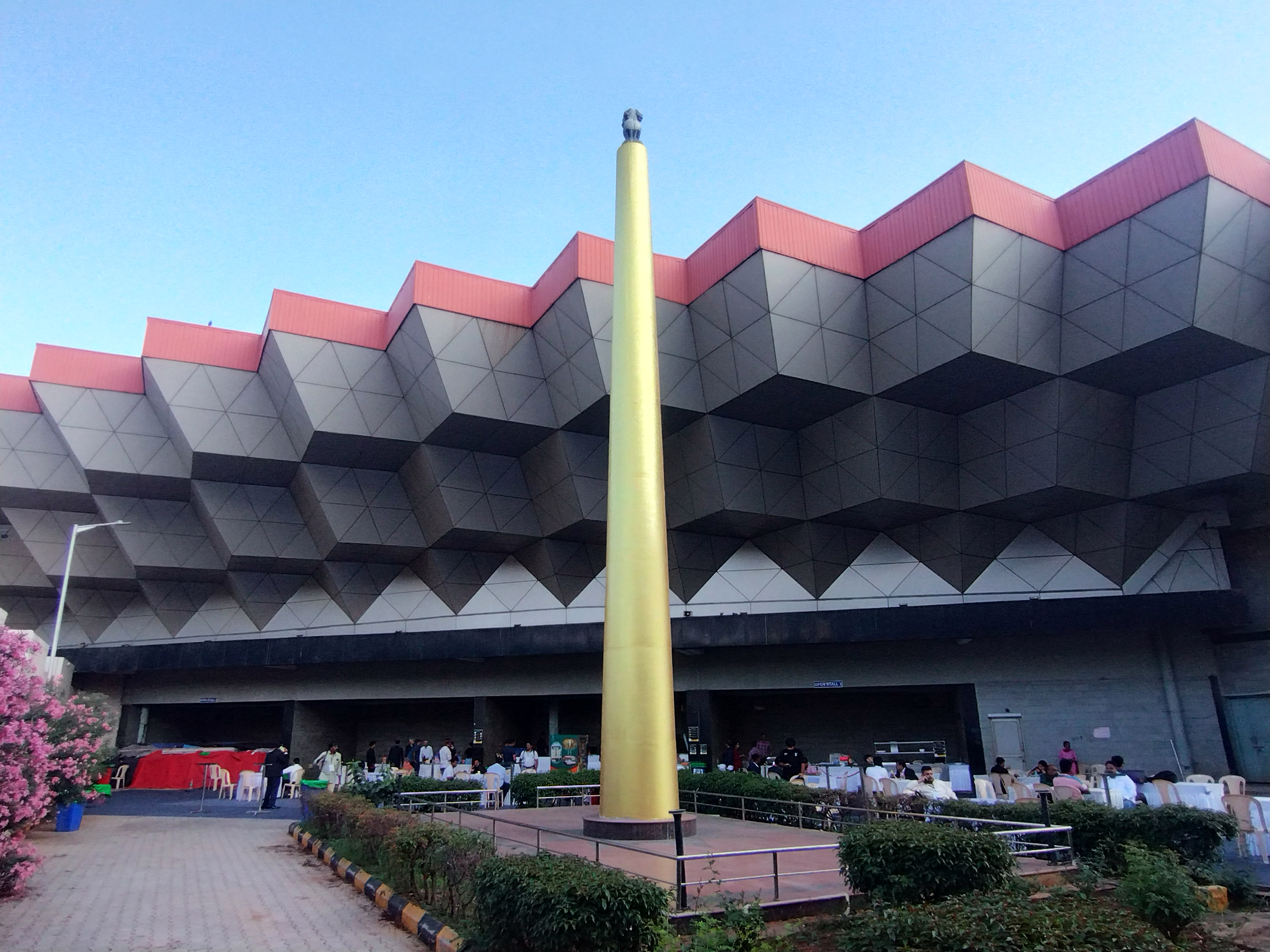

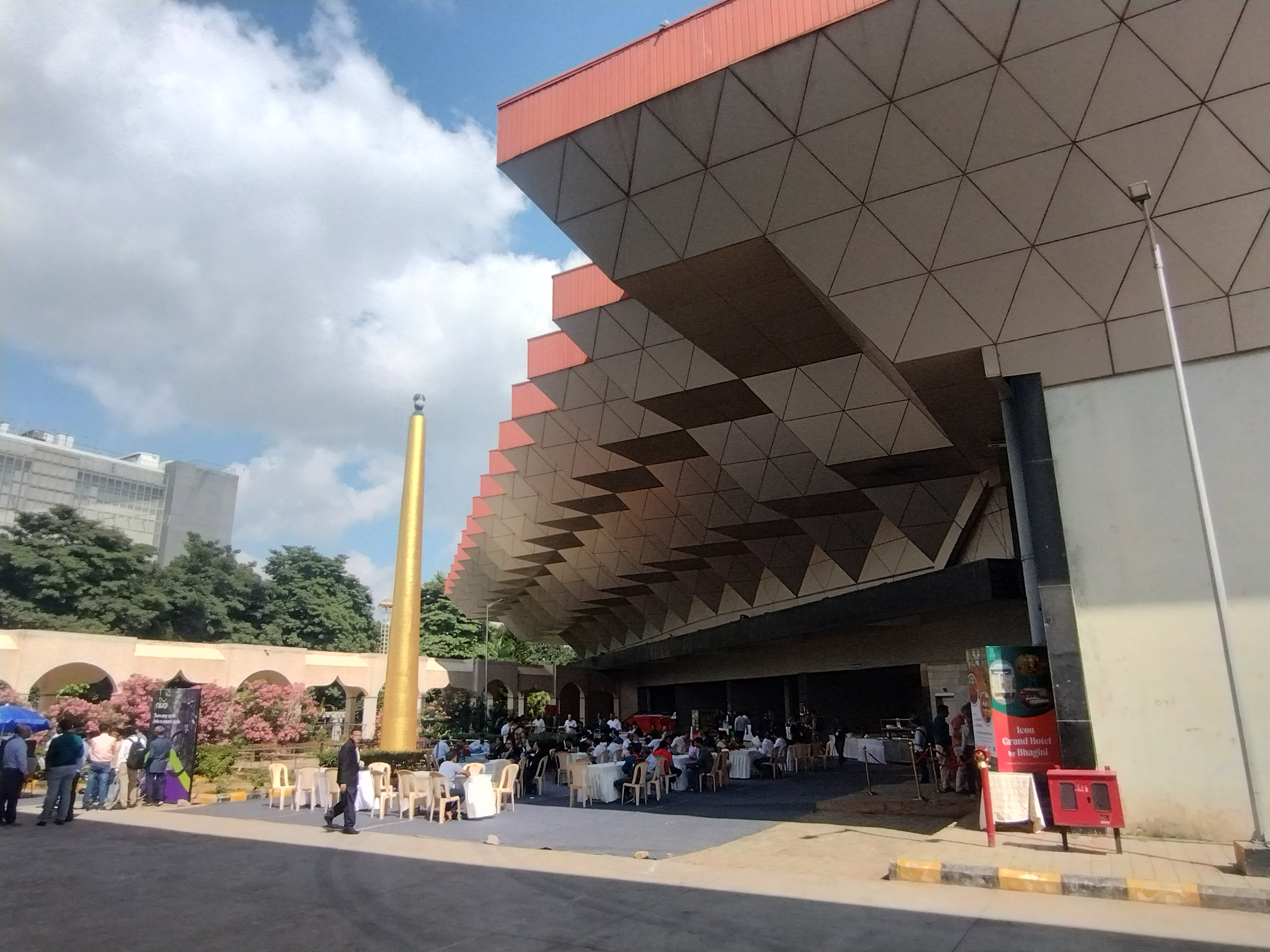

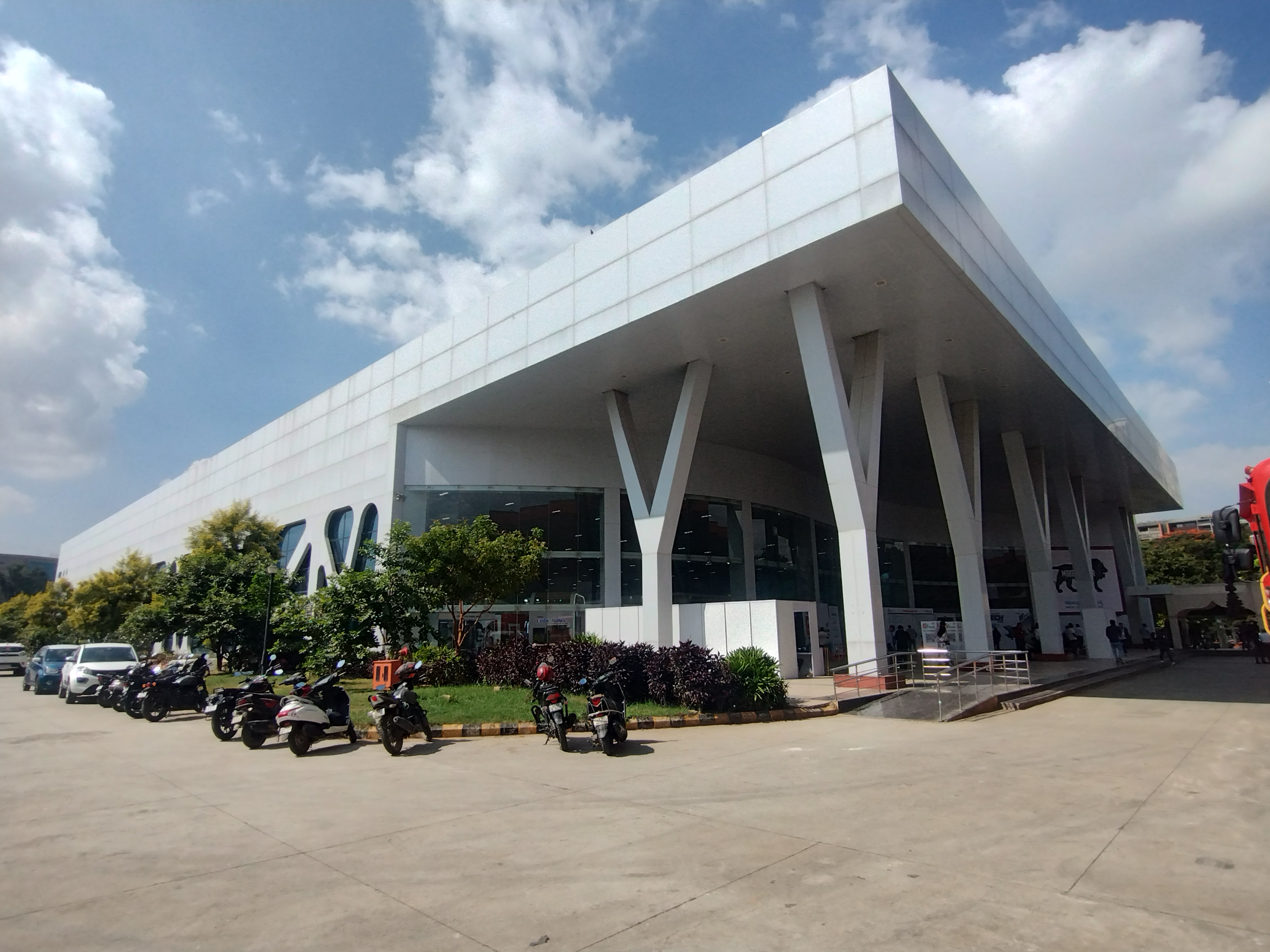

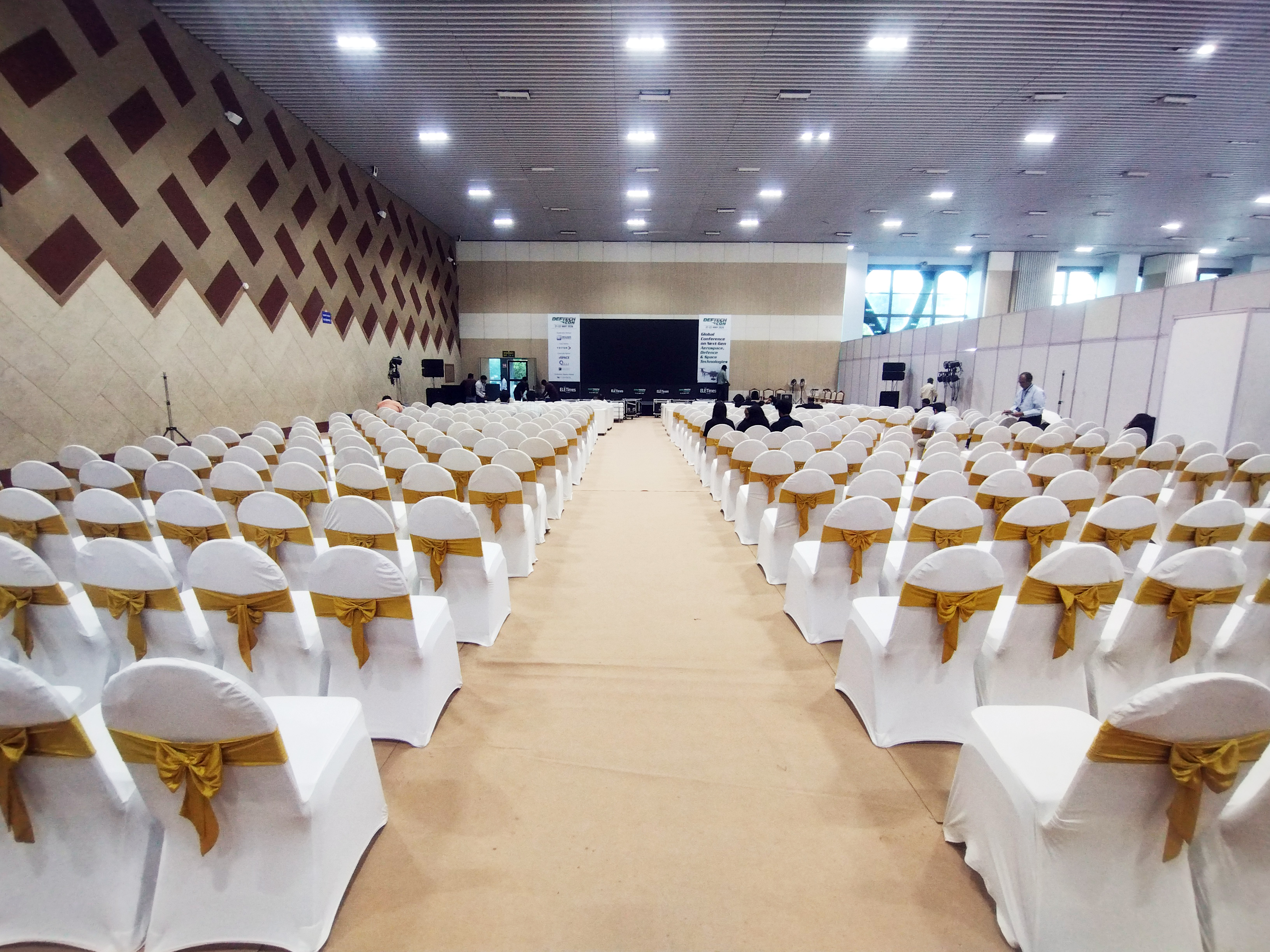

== See also ==
- Bangalore International Exhibition Centre
