= Nallurhalli metro station =

Namma Metro's Purple Line metro station

Nallurhalli
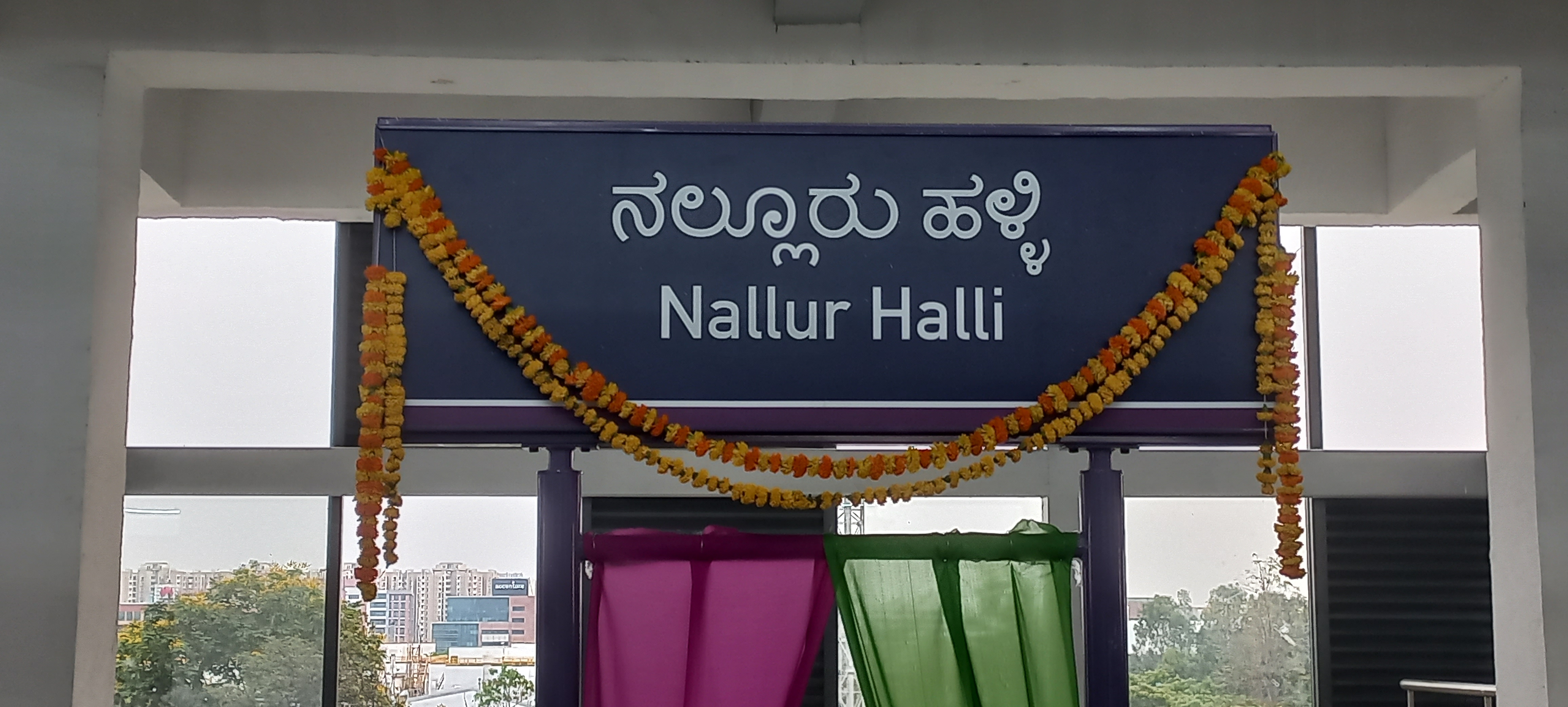
- Nallurhalli metro station

General information
- Location: Vijaynagar, KIADB Export Promotion Industrial Area, Whitefield, Bengaluru, Karnataka 560066
- Coordinates: 12.976528°N 77.724763°E
- System: Namma Metro station
- Owner: Bangalore Metro Rail Corporation Ltd (BMRCL)
- Operator: Namma Metro
- Line: Purple Line
- Platforms: Side platform Platform-1 → Whitefield (Kadugodi); Platform-2 → Challaghatta
- Tracks: 2

Construction
- Structure type: Elevated, Double track
- Platform levels: 2
- Parking: Two Wheelers
- Accessible: Yes
- Architect: ITD - ITD Cementation India JV

Other information
- Status: Staffed
- Station code: VDHP

History
- Opened: 26 March 2023; 3 years ago
- Electrified: 750 V DC third rail

Services
Preceding station	Namma Metro	Following station
Sri Sathya Sai Hospital towards Whitefield (Kadugodi)	Purple Line	Kundalahalli towards Challaghatta
Route map
Location

Nallurhalli is an elevated metro station on the East-West corridor of the Purple Line of Namma Metro in Bengaluru, India. This station is located near the GE Healthcare centre, CWC CFS Container Services, Flipkart ITPL Hub, Vydehi Hospital, Whitefield TTMC Bus Stop and many more.

The Whitefield - Krishnarajapura trial runs were successfully conducted from 25 October for a month. This metro station was inaugurated on March 25, 2023 by Prime Minister Narendra Modi and was opened to the public on March 26, 2023.

== Station layout ==
G	Street level	Exit/Entrance
L1	Mezzanine	Fare control, station agent, Metro Card vending machines, crossover
L2	Side Platform | Doors will open on the left
L2	Platform 1 Eastbound	Towards → Whitefield (Kadugodi); Next Station: Sri Sathya Sai Hospital
L2	Platform 2 Westbound	Towards ← Challaghatta; Next Station: Kundalahalli
L2	Side Platform | Doors will open on the left
L2

== Entry/Exit ==
There are 2 Entry/Exit points - A and B. Commuters can use either of the points for their travel.

- Entry/Exit point A - Towards GE HealthCare side
- Entry/Exit point B - Towards Prasad Tech Park side

== See also ==
- Bangalore
- List of Namma Metro stations
- Transport in Karnataka
- List of metro systems
- List of rapid transit systems in India
- Bangalore Metropolitan Transport Corporation
