= Aki General Hospital Station =

Railway station in Aki, Kōchi Prefecture, Japan

Aki General Hospital Station あき総合病院前駅
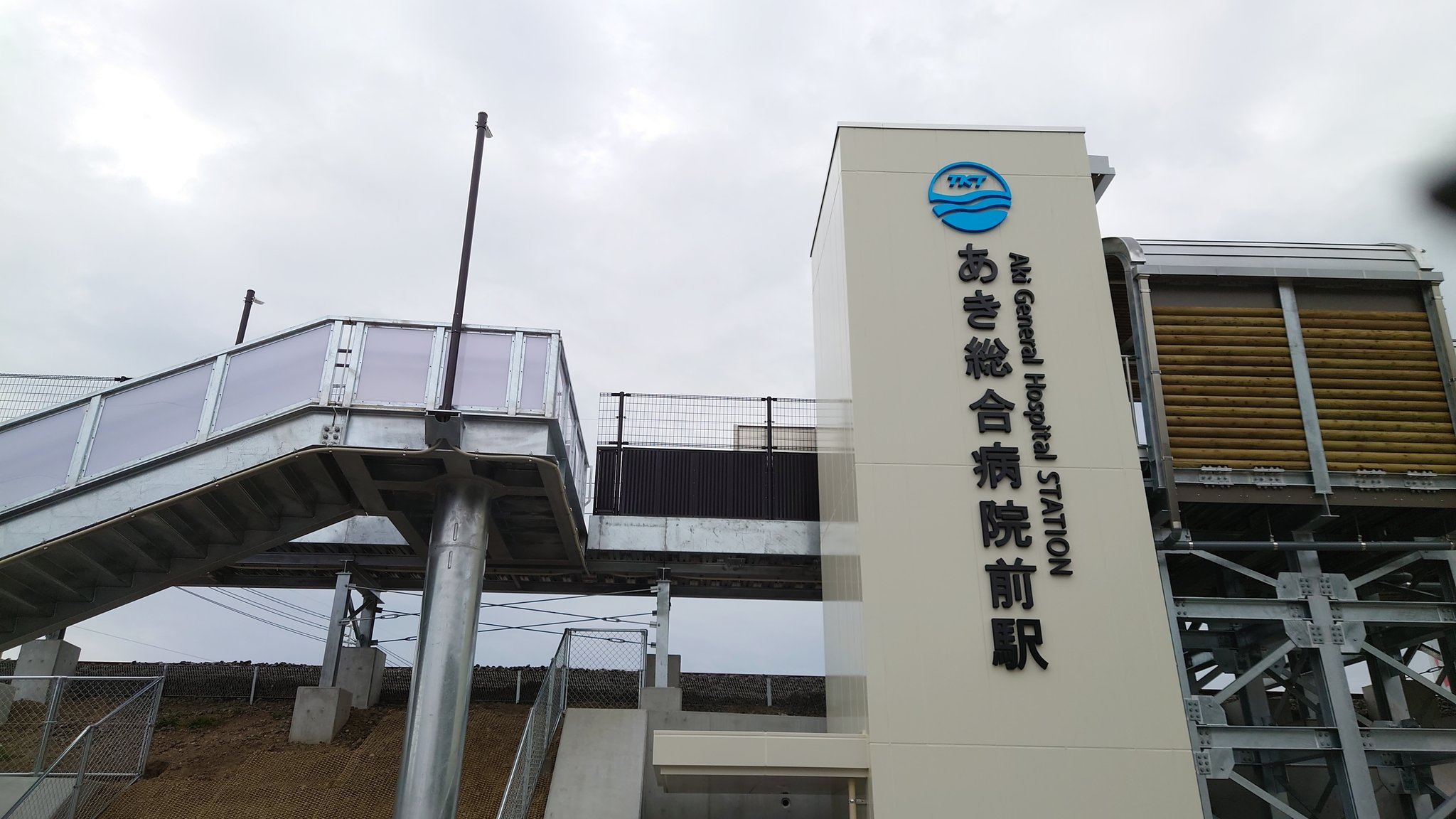
- View of the station platform and lift shaft from street level

General information
- Other names: Aki-Sogo-byoin-mae Station
- Location: Aki-shi, Kōchi-ken 784-0026; Japan
- Coordinates: 33°30′15″N 133°53′49″E
- Operator: Tosa Kuroshio Railway
- Line: ■ Asa Line
- Distance: 26.8 km from Gomen
- Platforms: 1 (1 side platform)
- Tracks: 1
- Train operators: Tosa Kuroshio Railway

Construction
- Structure type: Elevated (Embankment)
- Parking: Yes (Aki General Hospital)
- Accessible: Yes

Other information
- Status: Unstaffed

History
- Opened: 13 March 2021
Location
- Location within Kochi Prefecture Location within Japan

Aki General Hospital Station (あき総合病院前駅, Aki-Sōgō-byōin-mae-eki) is a passenger railway station located in Somei-cho, Aki City, Kōchi Prefecture, Japan. The station is operated by the third-sector Tosa Kuroshio Railway, and serves the nearby Aki General Hospital. The station, which opened on 13 March 2021, is the first new infill station to be opened on the Asa Line since the opening of the Asa Line in 2002.

== Station layout ==
The station, which is unstaffed, is located on an embankment, consisting of one side platform located north of the single track that runs through the station. Stairs and a lift provide access to the station from street level, located below the platform. All trains on the Asa Line stop at the station, including rapid trains.

== Adjacent stations ==
«	Service	»
Asa Line
Kyūjōmae	Rapid	Aki
Kyūjōmae	Local	Aki

== Station mascot ==
Each station on the Asa Line features a cartoon mascot character designed by Takashi Yanase, a local cartoonist from Kōchi Prefecture who deceased in 2013. The mascot for Aki-Sogo-byoin-mae Station is a nurse in pink uniform named Aki Nurse-chan (あき ナースちゃん), newly designed by the Yanase Studio in the same style as Yanase for the station's opening in 2021. The nurse theme relates to the hospital near to the station.

== History ==
The Council for the Revitalisation of the Gomen-Nahari Line announced on 5 December 2018 that it had reached a decision to construct an infill station to serve the Aki General Hospital. The station name was finalised as Aki General Hospital Station on 18 December 2020, and the station itself opened to passengers on 13 March 2021.

== Surrounding area ==
- Aki General Hospital
- Japan National Route 55

== See also ==
- List of railway stations in Japan
