= St. Mary's Hospital Station =

Railway station in Kurume, Fukuoka Prefecture, Japan

St. Mary's Hospital 聖マリア病院前駅
- South entrance

General information
- Location: Tsubukuhonmachi, Kurume-shi, Fukuoka-ken 830-0047; Japan
- Coordinates: 33°18′08″N 130°30′37″E
- Operator: Nishi-Nippon Railroad
- Line: ■ Tenjin Ōmuta Line
- Distance: 40.1 km from Nishitetsu Fukuoka (Tenjin)
- Platforms: 2 side platforms
- Connections

Construction
- Structure type: Elevated

Other information
- Status: Staffed
- Station code: T29
- Website: Official website

History
- Opened: 6 October 1933
- Former names: Shikenjōmae (until 2024)

Passengers
- FY2022: 2923

Services
Preceding station	Nishitetsu	Following station
Hanabatake towards Nishitetsu Fukuoka (Tenjin)	Tenjin Ōmuta Line Local	Tsubuku towards Ōmuta
Location
- Location within Fukuoka Prefecture Location within Japan

St. Mary's Hospital Station (聖マリア病院前駅, Sei-maria-byōin-mae-eki) is a passenger railway station located in the city of Kurume, Fukuoka, Japan. It is operated by the private transportation company Nishi-Nippon Railroad (NNR), and has station number T29. The former name Shikenjōmae Station (試験場前駅), meaning "testing center," came from the Fukuoka Prefecture Kurume Industrial Testing Center, which existed at the time the station was established.

== Lines ==
The station is served by the Nishitetsu Tenjin Ōmuta Line and is 40.1 kilometers from the starting point of the line at Nishitetsu Fukuoka (Tenjin) Station.

== Station layout ==
The station consists of a two elevated opposed side platforms with the station building underneath. The station is staffed.

== Platforms ==
1	■ Tenjin Ōmuta Line	for Nishitetsu Yanagawa and Ōmuta
2	■ Tenjin Ōmuta Line	for Nishitetsu Kurume, Nishitetsu Futsukaichi and Fukuoka

== History ==
The station opened on 6 October 1933 as a station on the Okawa Railway. In 1937, the Okawa Railway merged with the Kyushu Railway and the line was electrified and incorporated into the Omuta Line. The company merged with the Kyushu Electric Tramway on 19 September 1942. The company changed its name to Nishi-Nippon Railroad three days later, on 22 September 1942.

Effective the timetable revision on 16 March 2024, the station was renamed to St. Mary’s Hospital Station.

== Passenger statistics ==
In fiscal 2022, the station was used by 2923 passengers daily.

== Surrounding area ==
- Japan National Route 209
- St.Mary's Hospital
- Kurume Shikenjo Ekimae Post Office
- Kurume High School
- Kurume Substation (Kyushu Electric Power)

== See also ==
- List of railway stations in Japan
