= The Hospital (American TV series) =

American sketch comedy television series

- Also known as: The Hospital: A Comedy Improv Sketch Show
- Genre: Sketch comedy
- Created by: Kevin Fredericks; Richard A. Washington
- Written by: Kevin Fredericks; Richard A. Washington; Brandon Cormell; Roxxy Haze; Dominic Oliver
- Directed by: Kevin Fredericks; Richard A. Washington
- Starring: Kevin Fredericks; Tony Baker; Chris Powell; D'Lai; Dinora Walcott; Quin Walters; Tahir Moore; Candice Renee; Tamara Jade; Patrick Cloud; Mel Mitchell; Jordan Conley; Loren Lott; Jazmine Robinson
- Country of origin: United States
- Original language: English
- No. of seasons: 1
- No. of episodes: 4

Production
- Executive producers: Kevin Fredericks; Melissa Fredericks; Richard A. Washington; LeBron James; Maverick Carter; Jamal Henderson; Lezlie Wills
- Production company: KevOnStage Studios

Original release
- Network: BET
- Release: September 10 – September 17, 2025

The Hospital (also known as The Hospital: A Comedy Improv Sketch Show) is an American sketch comedy television series that premiered on BET on September 10, 2025.

== Cast ==
- Kevin Fredericks
- Tony Baker
- Chris Powell
- D'Lai
- Dinora Walcott
- Quin Walters
- Tahir Moore
- Candice Renee
- Tamara Jade
- Patrick Cloud
- Mel Mitchell
- Jordan Conley
- Loren Lott
- Jazmine Robinson

== Episodes ==
No.	Title	Original release date	U.S. viewers (millions)
1	"Imposter Syndrome"	September 10, 2025	N/A
1	"Scrub Money"	September 10, 2025	N/A
2	"Blood Type"	September 10, 2025	N/A
2	"Home Remedy Roulette"	September 10, 2025	N/A
3	"Double Or Nothing"	September 17, 2025	N/A
3	"Make A Wish"	September 17, 2025	N/A
4	"Lyrical Surgery"	September 17, 2025	N/A
4	"Get It Poppin"	September 17, 2025	N/A
