= Sri Sathya Sai Hospital metro station =

Namma Metro's Purple Line metro station

Sri Sathya Sai Hospital
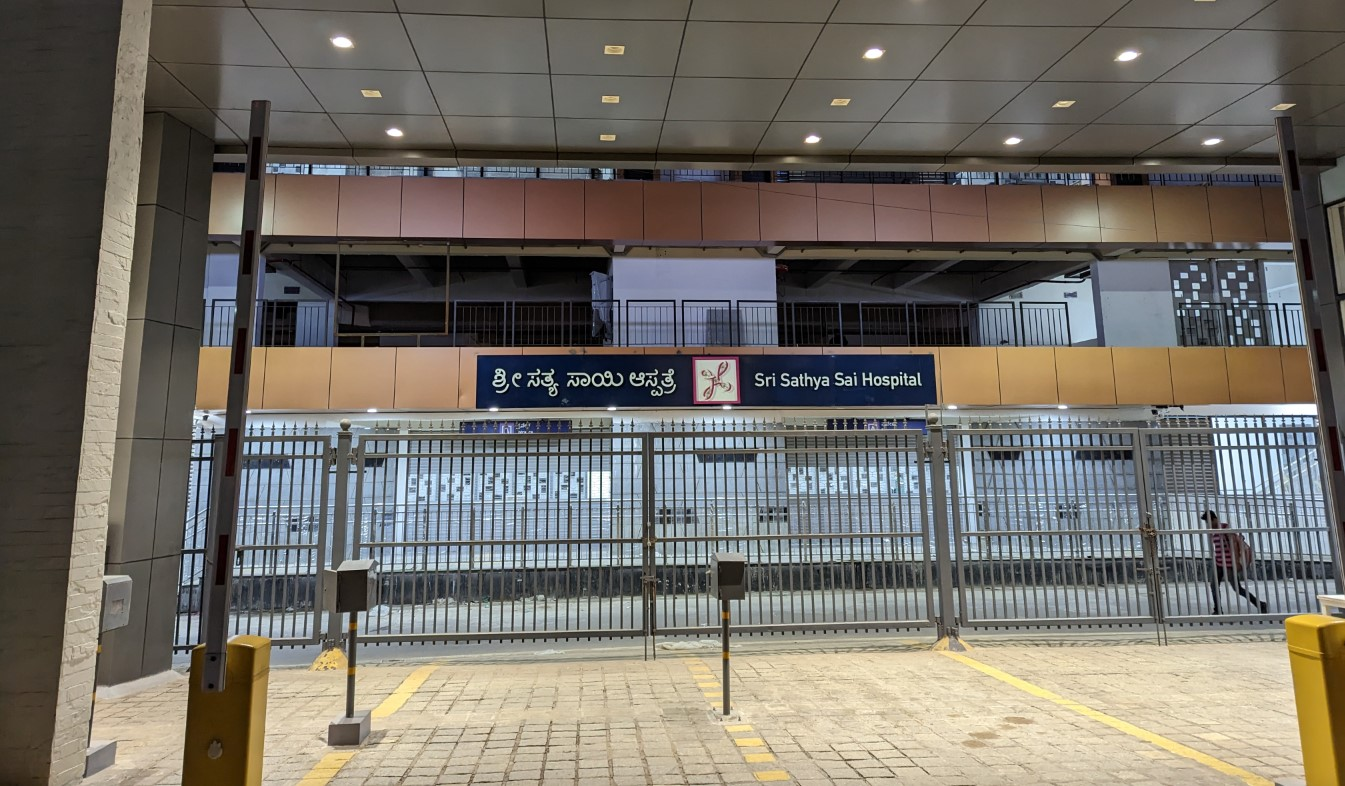
- Sri Sathya Sai Hospital metro station (Night view)

General information
- Location: KIADB Export Promotion Industrial Area, Whitefield, Bengaluru, Karnataka 560066
- Coordinates: 12.98102°N 77.72762°E
- System: Namma Metro station
- Owner: Bangalore Metro Rail Corporation Ltd (BMRCL)
- Operator: Namma Metro
- Line: Purple Line
- Platforms: Side platform Platform-1 → Whitefield (Kadugodi); Platform-2 → Challaghatta
- Tracks: 2

Construction
- Structure type: Elevated, Double track
- Platform levels: 2
- Parking: Two Wheelers
- Accessible: Yes
- Architect: ITD - ITD Cementation India JV

Other information
- Status: Staffed
- Station code: SSHP

History
- Opened: 26 March 2023; 3 years ago
- Electrified: 750 V DC third rail

Services
Preceding station	Namma Metro	Following station
Pattandur Agrahara towards Whitefield (Kadugodi)	Purple Line	Nallurhalli towards Challaghatta
Route map
Location

Sri Sathya Sai Hospital is an elevated metro station on the east–west corridor of the Purple Line of Namma Metro in Bengaluru, India. The station is situated near the main Sri Sathya Sai Institute of Higher Medical Sciences, Makino India Pvt. Ltd., Gopalan Global Axis and many more.

The Whitefield - Krishnarjapura trial runs were successfully conducted from 25 October for a month. This metro station was inaugurated on March 25, 2023, by Prime Minister Narendra Modi and was opened to the public on March 26, 2023.

== Station layout ==
G	Street level	Exit/Entrance
L1	Mezzanine	Fare control, station agent, Metro Card vending machines, crossover
L2	Side platform | Doors will open on the left
L2	Platform 1 Eastbound	Towards → Whitefield (Kadugodi); Next station: Pattandur Agrahara
L2	Platform 2 Westbound	Towards ← Challaghatta; Next station: Nallur Halli
L2	Side platform | Doors will open on the left
L2

== Entry and exit ==
There are two entry and exit points - A and B. Commuters can use either of the points for their travel.

- Point A - Towards KIADB Industrial Area side
- Point B - Towards Sri Sathya Sai Hospital side

== See also ==
- Bangalore
- List of Namma Metro stations
- Transport in Karnataka
- List of metro systems
- List of rapid transit systems in India
- Bangalore Metropolitan Transport Corporation
