= Haggard (surname) =

Haggard (/ˈhæɡərd/) is a surname.

== List of people with surname Haggard ==
- Barton J. Haggard, American college football coach (Hiram Terriers football)
- Chris Haggard (born 1971), South African professional tennis player
- Cornelius Paul Haggard, American theologian, president of Azusa Pacific University and founder of Evangel Church
- Daisy Haggard (born 1978), British actress
- Estelle Avinger Haggard (1884–1977), American clubwoman
- Gayle Haggard (born 1957), American evangelical author and speaker
- Godfrey Haggard (1884–1969), British diplomat
- H. Rider Haggard, Sir (1856–1925), British Victorian writer of adventure novels
- Hugh Haggard (1908–1991), British submarine commander during World War II
- John Haggard (1794–1856), British ecclesiastical lawyer
- Kenneth Haggard (born 1935), American architect, educator and solar pioneer
- Leroy Haggard (born 1968), birth name of Mr. Lee (rapper), American DJ, producer and rapper
- Lilias Rider Haggard (1892–1968), British writer
- Mark Haggard (1825–1854), British clergyman and rower
- Marty Haggard (born 1958), American country music singer and songwriter
- Merle Haggard (1937–2016), American country music singer and songwriter
- Noel Haggard (born 1963), American country music singer and songwriter
- Patrick Haggard, cognitive neuroscientist
- Paul Haggard, pen name of Stephen Longstreet (1907–2002), American writer
- Piers Haggard (1939–2023), British film and television director
- Stephan Haggard, American academic, author and scholar of Korean studies
- Stephen Haggard (1911–1943), British actor, writer and poet
- Ted Haggard (born 1956), American evangelical pastor and founder of New Life Church - Colorado Springs, Colorado
- Vernon Haggard (1874–1960), British Royal Navy admiral
- William Haggard (1907–1993), British writer of fictional spy thrillers
- William S. Haggard (1847–1911), American politician, Lieutenant Governor of Indiana

== See also ==
- Haggard family
