= William Debonaire Haggard =

Banker and numismatist (1787–1866)

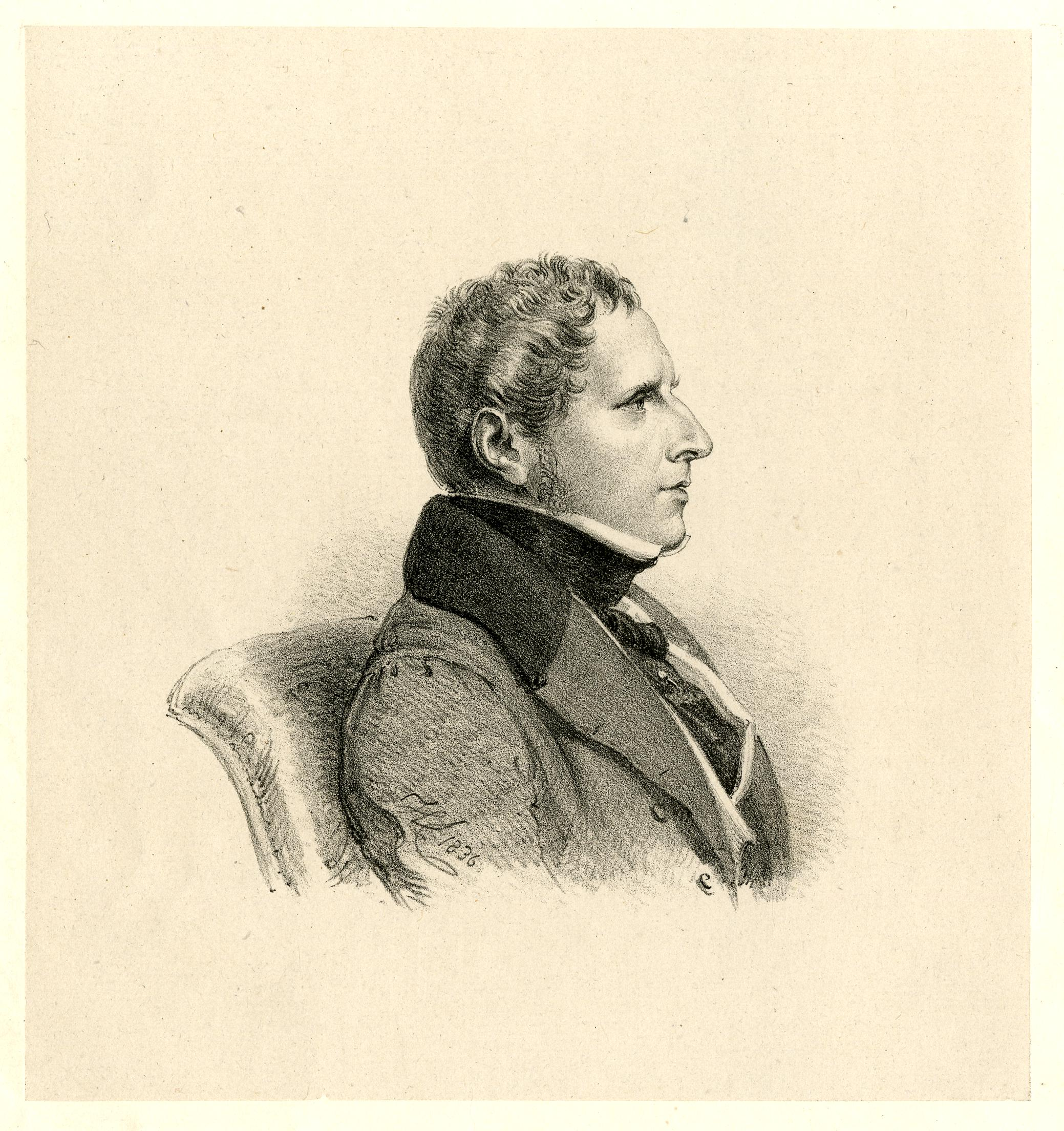
William Debonaire Haggard, portrait at the British Museum, London

William Debonaire Haggard FSA, FRAS (2 Feb 1787 – 4 Apr 1866) was a banker of the city of London, a numismatist, and an expert on bullion. He was the Principal of the Bullion Office of the Bank of England in the 1840s.

== Life ==
William Debonaire Haggard was the son of Mark Haggard, son of merchant Mark Haggard of Strafford-le-Bow.

His great-grandfather was John Haggard of Old Fort House, and through him, was a second cousin twice removed of Chancellor John Haggard, member of the Haggard family of Bradenham Hall. William, Chancellor Haggard's brother, was the grandfather of writer Sir H. Rider Haggard, and great-grandfather of Admiral Sir Vernon Haggard, and British Consul General of New York Sir Godfrey Haggard.

Through his son Frederick Thomas Haggard, with his wife Jane Copner, Debonaire was the grandfather of Eleanor, who married to John Edward Ivor Yale, son of lawyer William Corbet Yale of Plas-yn-Yale, member of the Yale family.

Frederick was a member of the London Stock Exchange, and an active member in the Tory political circles at the time of liberal U.K. Prime Minister, Lord Rosebery of Mentmore Towers, and Neville Chamberlain. He was also a descendant of the Huguenot Debonnaire family and married to Emily Caroline Anstey, a direct descendent of artist Christopher Anstey.

Haggard was elected a Fellow of the Society of Antiquaries on 28 February 1833, described as "a gentleman peculiarly conversant in the numismatic antiquities of this country". He was also a Fellow of the Royal Asiatic Society, and the Royal Numismatic Society. He was President of the Royal Numismatic Society from 1847 to 1849.

As Chief of the Bullion Office of the Bank of England, he was brought in front of the Bank's Governor William Cotton, Commissary-General Sir Edward Pine Coffin, MP Richard Lalor Sheil, and William Nairn Forbes of the East India Company, to testify. The commission was appointed to inquire into the constitution, management, and expense of the Royal Mint under Queen Victoria, relating to the melting of gold coins into bars.

He was also an art collector and his collection was sold at auction by Sotheby's, Wilkinson & Hodge on 22–23 August 1866.

There is a portrait of Haggard, by Leonard Charles Wyon, 1844, in the British Museum.

With another wife, Jane Le Crew, he had at least one son, Mark Haggard.

== Publications ==
- "Observations on the standard of value and the circulating medium of this country", The Numismatic Chronicle (1838–1842), 2, 17–35.
- Some remarks on the English coinage (1835)
- Miscellaneous papers (Windsor, 1860) - privately printed.
- "The life of Abraham Newland, late principal cashier of the Bank of England, 1808": Some comments on portions of the above essay, and remarks on our present monetary system (1866)
- (with Eckfeldt, J., and Du Bois, W.) "New Varieties of Gold and Silver Coins, Counterfeit Coins, and Bullion, with Mint Values", The Numismatic Chronicle and Journal of the Numismatic Society, 13, 135-138 (1850).
- "Californian Gold", The Numismatic Chronicle and Journal of the Numismatic Society, 13 (1850), 37–41.
- "Notice of a medal of the Chevalier d'Eon", The Numismatic Chronicle and Journal of the Numismatic Society, 11 (1848), 48–56.
- "Medals of the Pretender", The Numismatic Chronicle (1838–1842), 1 (1838), 219–222.
- "Medals of the Pretender (part 2)", The Numismatic Chronicle (1838–1842), 2, 37–42.
- "Medals of the Pretender (part 3)", The Numismatic Chronicle (1838–1842), 3, 149–152.
- "Experiments made on a Piece of Peña Silver, Saved from the Lady Charlotte, Wrecked on the Coast of Ireland in December 1838, as to Its Capability of Holding Water" (abstract). Abstracts of the Papers Printed in the Philosophical Transactions of the Royal Society of London, 4 (1837), 118–119.
