= Haggard =

Haggard may refer to:

== Arts, entertainment, and media ==
- Haggard (band), a German symphonic metal group
- Haggard (TV series), a British comedy television series
- Haggard: The Movie, a 2003 film by Bam Margera
- King Haggard, a fictional character in Peter S. Beagle's The Last Unicorn

== Other ==
- Haggard (surname)
- Haggard family, a British family
- Haggard, Kansas, a community in the United States
- USS Haggard (DD-555) (1943–1945), destroyer

== See also ==
- Hoggard (disambiguation)
- Haggar (disambiguation)
