= Gerard Corley Smith =

Gerard Thomas Corley Smith (30 July 1909 – 7 October 1997) is remembered chiefly for his work in protecting the unique environment of the Galápagos Islands and his support for the Charles Darwin Foundation, established in 1959. However, Corley Smith also had a long and distinguished career in Her Majesty's Diplomatic Service.

== Education ==
The son of schoolmaster Thomas Smith of Bolton, Corley Smith was brought up in his native Lancashire. He was educated at Bolton School and attended Emmanuel College, Cambridge, where he graduated with a double first in modern languages. His younger brother was the author and journalist Denys Corley Smith.

== Diplomat ==
Corley Smith joined the consular service in 1931 and was posted to Paris, Oran, Detroit, La Paz and Milan. During World War II he was in St Louis and New York, and was engaged in the effort to persuade Americans that Britain's lonely resistance to the Nazis was a grim battle for freedom that the United States should recognise to be in their interest to join.

The possibility of a full diplomatic career only opened up to Corley Smith and to others with no private means after the Eden reforms of the 1940s. He was appointed as labour attaché in Brussels in 1945, and caught the attention of Ernest Bevin, foreign secretary in the post-war Labour government. Bevin, keen to encourage closer ties with European trade unions, saw Corley Smith as well suited to work in this new area. He was posted to UN headquarters in 1949 as counsellor at the Economic and Social Council of the United Nations.

As Britain's EcoSoc representative, Corley Smith was chosen to present the case against the Soviet forced labour camps, or gulags, the existence of which was only then beginning to be revealed to the world. It was a task that predictably earned him the anger and disapproval of the Eastern Bloc delegations and their press. Much of his time in New York was taken up in drafting the UN Charter on Employment following the adoption of the 1948 Universal Declaration of Human Rights (Art.23), which stated among other things: "Everyone has the right to work, to free choice of employment, to just and favorable conditions of work and to protection against unemployment." Member states were unable to agree on the wording or the substance of the draft charter, and it was not adopted by the UN.

Corley Smith returned to Europe in 1952 and was awarded the CMG. He spent two years in Paris and five in Madrid before being appointed British ambassador to Haiti, which was ruled by François 'Papa Doc' Duvalier. With little he could do diplomatically in Haiti where, according to Graham Greene, "it was impossible to deepen the night", Corley Smith was able to develop his hobby of bird-watching.

Eventually, he was chosen as the spokesman for a number of foreign embassies to protest to Duvalier about the reign of terror and extortion by the Tonton Macoute, Duvalier's private mafia. The result was immediate denunciation as an "impertinent British colonialist", and a demand for his recall. Corley Smith regarded being thrown out of Haiti as an honour, and certainly a better fate than was usually meted out to critics of Duvalier's regime. Years later, he said: "I find it difficult to conceive of any solution to Haiti's problems. The country has been independent for two centuries now and it has never had a good leader."

His final posting was as ambassador to Ecuador, where he found many opportunities for ornithology in a country with a wide variety of climates from tropical Amazonia to the high Andes.

== Evolution ==
In Ecuador, Corley Smith's expertise on high altitude humming-birds found on the Cotopaxi led him to become friends with Professor Jean Dorst, a French ornithologist who was also president of the newly formed Charles Darwin Foundation (CDF) for the Galápagos Islands, which Corley Smith went to visit. On the Royal Yacht Britannia he visited the islands again in 1964 with the Duke of Edinburgh, who later became patron of the foundation.

Corley Smith worked to establish a national park to protect the Galápagos environment under Ecuadorean control, and organised a British-financed study to recommend how the needs of conservation should be reconciled with the development of tourism to help the economy of the islands. Corley Smith left Ecuador in 1967, and the following year the new National Park Service of Ecuador came into existence. The newly retired ambassador was lured to join the CDF's executive council. The first council meeting he attended was in England, at Down House, Darwin's former home, where members saw in the tall, silver-haired and distinguished-looking former diplomat a remarkable likeness to the portrait there of T. H. Huxley.

In 1972, when Sir Thomas Barlow stepped down, Corley Smith took on the role of secretary-general of the foundation. It was a great coup for the ever-persuasive Jean Dorst. While the Charles Darwin Research Station (CDRS) on the islands was managed by a resident director, all the CDF administration and other international work – including the production of a bi-annual bulletin Noticias de Galápagos – were carried out from Corley Smith's home, Greensted Hall, in Essex.

He is credited with successfully promoting and maintaining a good working relationship between the national government and the international scientific body, which was seen by many in Ecuador as encroaching on their territory. "Most crucially," as Professor Dorst later wrote, "he perceived and understood the way the foundation had to meet and adapt to changing conditions in Ecuador."

On handing over the role in 1984, Corley Smith was awarded the Order of Merit by the Ecuadorean government, and continued to visit the Galápagos often – eight times in the next 12 years – and to travel widely round the world.

The extensive library at the CDRS, which holds the most complete collection of material on Galápagos anywhere in the world, is dedicated to the memory of Corley Smith.

== Family ==
Corley Smith was predeceased by his wife, Joan Haggard, whom he married in August 1937. She was the daughter of diplomat Sir Godfrey Digby Napier Haggard and sister of actor Stephen Haggard. Upon his death in 1997 at age 88, Corley Smith was survived by a son and three daughters.
