= Hugh Haggard =

Commander Hugh Haggard DSO DSC
- Born: 21 June 1908; Stock, Essex, England
- Died: 17 November 1991 (aged 83); Northamptonshire, England
- Spouse: Lydia Constance Watson Haggard
- Relatives: Sir Vernon Harry Stuart Haggard; Sir Godfrey Digby Napier Haggard; Sir Henry Rider Haggard
- Military career
- Allegiance: United Kingdom
- Branch: Royal Navy
- Rank: Commander
- Commands: HMS H44 (1939 - 1940); HMS Truant (1940 - 1943)
- Conflicts: World War II
- Awards: Distinguished Service Order (1942); Distinguished Service Cross (1941)

Hugh Alfred Vernon Haggard, DSO, DSC (21 June 1908 – 17 November 1991) was a Royal Navy officer who commanded HMS Truant, a T-class submarine, during World War II. Truant was one of the most successful of Britain's undersea prowlers during that war.

== Background ==
A member of the Haggard family, he was the only son of Admiral Sir Vernon Harry Stuart Haggard and his wife Dorothy Booker Ellis Haggard, having been born on 21 June 1908 in Stock, Essex. His father was Commander-in-Chief of the America and West Indies Station. Hugh Haggard was the nephew of diplomat Sir Godfrey Digby Napier Haggard, who served as British Consul General at New York during World War II. He was also the grandnephew of prolific author Sir Henry Rider Haggard, who attained literary fame with his romances King Solomon's Mines and She: A History of Adventure.

== Naval career ==
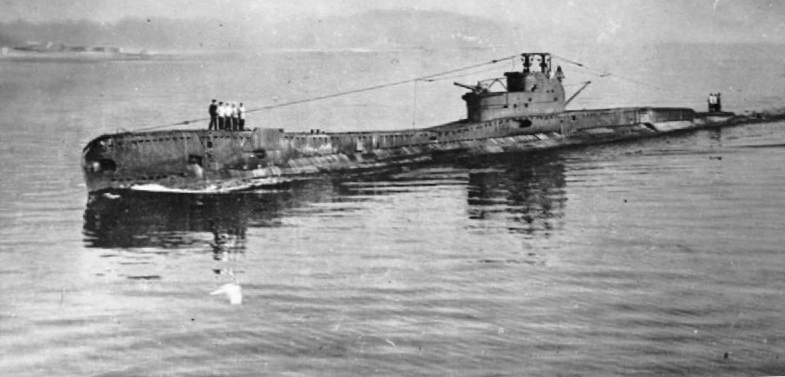
HMS Truant

At 6 feet 5 inches (196 cm), Haggard was one of the tallest submarine officers in the Royal Navy. By 15 September 1925, he had become a cadet and was serving in the battleship Revenge, of the Atlantic Fleet. He was a midshipman by 15 May 1926, and aboard the battlecruiser Renown by 3 December 1926. By 1 September 1928, Haggard was an acting sub-lieutenant. That year, he attended the Royal Naval College, Greenwich. On 1 July 1929, Acting Sub-Lieutenant Haggard was promoted to sub-lieutenant and, in 1931, he served aboard the cruiser Cardiff. On 2 December 1931, he became a lieutenant, continuing to serve on the Cardiff. By 17 May 1934, he was a lieutenant on the submarine Severn, which had just been launched that year. By 1937, Haggard was serving as lieutenant aboard the submarine Rover of the 4th Submarine Flotilla. Haggard assumed command of the H-class submarine H44 in 1939, which he retained until 1940. In December 1939, he was promoted to lieutenant commander.

Haggard assumed command of HMS Truant in the spring of 1940, succeeding Lieutenant Commander Christopher Haynes Hutchinson. In September 1940, Truant became one of the first T-class submarines to arrive in the Mediterranean. Truant, under the command of Lieutenant Commander Haggard, sank Provvidenza on 22 September 1940, during the course of her first Mediterranean patrol. In December of that year, an Admiralty communiqué indicated that: "His majesty's submarine Truant (Lieut. Com. H. A. V. Haggard) has been operating with great success against the Italian sea communications off the south of Italy." The vessel had sunk at least one of the enemy supply ships in an escorted convoy off Cape Spartivento on the night of 13–14 December 1940. Two nights later, Truant successfully torpedoed an Italian tanker, which sank off the Calabrian coast.

From her arrival in September 1940 to her departure from the Mediterranean in December 1941, at which time the vessel headed for the Far East, Truant completed eleven Mediterranean patrols. During that time, the submarine sank eight merchant vessels and a small destroyer, which totalled 27,553 tons. In addition, Truant was credited with a naval auxiliary weighing 1,080 tons, which was said to have "died of fright" and run aground (Truant's torpedoes never made contact with the ship.) In May 1941, Admiral Sir Andrew Cunningham indicated that "the operations of HMS/M Truant have been a model of daring and enterprise, tempered with just the right degree of caution." Lieutenant Commander Haggard was twice mentioned in despatches, on 14 January 1941 and 14 October 1941. That same year, on 12 August 1941, he was the recipient of the Distinguished Service Cross. On 17 March 1942, he was appointed as a Companion of the Distinguished Service Order "for bravery and enterprise while serving in H.M.S. Truant during successful Submarine patrols."

In December 1942, Truant, commanded by Haggard and described at that time as "the most successful British submarine," returned to Britain after an 80,000-mile, two and a half-year mission in which the vessel was credited with sinking or damaging at least 20 Axis ships. The vessel flew the Jolly Roger, with four stars and sixteen white bars, representing vessels successfully attacked with guns and torpedoes, respectively. Truant had seen action in the Mediterranean Sea, Indian Ocean, and Java Sea. On 31 December 1942, Lieutenant Commander Haggard was promoted to commander. He was in command of the Truant until 1943, when he transferred to the Elfin.

By January 1945, Haggard served on the submarine depot ship Medway II. He was a commanding officer for submarines with another submarine depot ship, Maidstone, from September 1945. He was executive officer of Devonshire from 16 March 1947. Commander Haggard retired from the Royal Navy on 19 November 1953 for medical reasons.

== Later life ==
Haggard married Lydia Constance Watson in 1957. In 1973, he served as master of the Clothworkers' Company. He was widowed on 11 March 1984. Retired Commander Hugh Haggard died in November 1991 in Northamptonshire.

== Legacy ==
On 15 December 1942, Lieutenant Commander Haggard was interviewed by the BBC and in 1985 he was interviewed for the Imperial War Museums where copies of both interviews are kept but are not (as of April 2013) available online.
