= Lilias Rider Haggard =

Lilias Margitson Rider Haggard, MBE (9 December 1892 – 9 January 1968) was the fourth and youngest child of the British writer Sir Henry Rider Haggard and Mariana Louisa Margitson and a cousin of the naval officer Sir Vernon Haggard and the diplomat Sir Godfrey Haggard.

A member of the Haggard family, she was educated at Saint Felix School in Southwold, Suffolk. For her work as a Voluntary Aid Detachment auxiliary nurse during the First World War, she was awarded an MBE in 1920. She was a member of Norfolk County Council from 1949 to 1952 and in 1953 was elected president of the Norfolk Rural Craftsmen's Guild.

She wrote a number of books, including a biography of her father entitled The Cloak That I Left. Her book Norfolk Life, based on columns she wrote for the Eastern Daily Press, contains an introduction by Henry Williamson.

She is buried at Ditchingham, Norfolk, and is the subject of a 2015 biography by Victoria Manthorpe.

== Books ==
- I Walked by Night: Being the Life History of the King of the Norfolk Poachers, written by himself, editor (1935), illus. Edward Seago
- The Rabbit Skin Cap: A Tale of a Norfolk Countryman's Youth, editor (1939), illus. Edward Seago
- Norfolk Life (1943), with Henry Williamson
- A Norfolk Notebook (1946)
- A Country Scrapbook (1950), illus. Wilfred S. Pettitt
- The Cloak That I Left: A Biography of the Author Henry Rider Haggard (1951)
- Too Late for Tears (1969), a biography of her mother and her family
