= Piers Haggard =

British film and television director (1939–2023)

Piers Haggard OBE
- Haggard during filming of The Blood on Satan's Claw (1971)
- Born: 18 March 1939; London, England
- Died: 11 January 2023 (aged 83); United Kingdom
- Occupation: Director
- Spouses: Christiane Stokes (m. 1960, divorced) Anna Sklovsky (m. 1972)
- Children: 6, including Daisy
- Father: Stephen Haggard
- Relatives: H. Rider Haggard (great-great-uncle)
- Family: Haggard

Piers Inigo Haggard, OBE (18 March 1939 – 11 January 2023) was an English director who worked in film, television, and theatre. He was known for directing numerous television programmes and serials in a career which spanned over 40 years, and won a BAFTA TV Award for the musical drama serial Pennies from Heaven. His notable theatrical films included the cult classic horror film The Blood on Satan's Claw (1971), which is recognized as the progenitor of the folk horror genre.

Haggard was also a founding member and the first chairman of the Directors Guild of Great Britain (DGGB), as well as a co-founder of Directors UK.

== Early life ==
A member of the Haggard family, he was born in London, the son of Morna Gillespie and the actor, poet, and novelist Stephen Haggard. He was the great-great-nephew of the writer Sir Henry Rider Haggard.

At the age of one, Haggard was evacuated with his mother and older brother Paul to New York where his paternal grandfather Godfrey Haggard was the British consul-general. Shortly after they left, his father wrote his sons a letter, which later that year was published in the Atlantic Monthly as "I'll Go to Bed at Noon: A Soldier's Letter to His Sons". Haggard and his mother returned to Britain after his brother's death from diphtheria. There a younger brother, Mark, was born.

His father was a captain in the British Intelligence Corps. Sent to Egypt, he had an affair with a married woman, and when she broke off the affair, he committed suicide in 1943. In 1946, Haggard’s mother remarried and the family moved to Muckhart Mill Farm in Clackmannanshire, Scotland. He attended school at Dollar Academy, and between 1956 and 1960 studied English at Edinburgh University. While there, he was active in the dramatic society as an actor and director, and helped found the Festival Fringe Society in 1958.

== Career ==
Haggard began his career as an assistant director at the Royal Court in 1960. In 1961, he was director of productions at the Dundee Rep including directing the pantomime Cinderella which was described by The Stage as “the best pantomime Dundee has seen in many years”. In 1962, he moved to the Glasgow Citizens, where productions included Albert Finney as Luigi Pirandello's Henry IV. He joined the first National Theatre company in 1963, where he co-directed with John Dexter and Bill Gaskill and assisted Laurence Olivier (1963 on Uncle Vanya, starring Michael Redgrave) and Franco Zeffirelli (1965 on Much Ado About Nothing, with Maggie Smith and Robert Stephens).

In 1965, he moved to BBC Television, directing plays for the anthology drama series Thirty-Minute Theatre and episodes of series such as The Newcomers, and Play for Today for the BBC, as well as Armchair Theatre, Callan, Man at the Top and Public Eye for ITV. He directed for a variety of programmes throughout the 1970s, such as The Rivals of Sherlock Holmes, Churchill's People, The Love School, Love for Lydia and Play of the Month: The Chester Mystery Plays (1976).

In 1978, Haggard was hired by producer Kenith Trodd to direct Dennis Potter's BBC drama serial Pennies from Heaven, which received a BAFTA. The following year, he directed the science-fiction serial Quatermass, a Euston Films production for Thames Television, which was shown on the ITV network.

Returning to the National Theatre in 1981, he directed Tom Taylor’s play The Ticket-of-Leave Man and the next year, at the Piccadilly Theatre, directed the Norwegian ‘opera-musical’ Which Witch, for which he worked on the libretto. For television, he directed two Alan Bennett plays Marks and Rolling Home (1982), Treasure Island (1985), Dennis Potter's Visitors (1987), and Jack Rosenthal’s Eskimo Day (1996) and Cold Enough for Snow (1997).

In 1966, Haggard began his film career working as an interpreter for Michelangelo Antonioni on the British-Italian film Blowup. His feature film debut was Wedding Night (1970). The producers of The Blood on Satan's Claw (1970) attended a screening of Wedding Night and offered the job of director to him. He also directed the cinema version of Quatermass (1980); Summer Story (1988); The Fiendish Plot of Dr. Fu Manchu (1980), Peter Sellers' last film; and Venom (1982). Haggard's audio commentary on Venom is well known for its forthrightness, and some hilarious anecdotes on the competitive antics of stars Oliver Reed and Klaus Kinski.

Later television work included Mrs Reinhardt (1986); a number of US TV Specials with stars such as Liza Minnelli, Cheryl Ladd and Judge Reinhold; the Gerry Anderson science-fiction series Space Precinct (1994); and various one-off TV dramas such as The Hunt (2001). The Canadian prairies-set Conquest (1998) was his last feature film. He directed Academy Award winners Vanessa Redgrave and Maximilian Schell in the 2006 mini-series The Shell Seekers.

Haggard campaigned for directors' rights. He was president of The Association of Directors and Producers in 1976; he founded and was first chairman of the Directors Guild of Great Britain (DGGB), formed in 1982 at a meeting of over a hundred film, theatre, and television directors at Ronnie Scott's Jazz Club in London. He started the Directors’ and Producers' Rights Society (DPRS, 1987), serving on its board for 20 years, until it transmuted in 2007 into Directors UK, where he served on the board until 2017. He was also vice president and chairman of FERA, the Association of European film directors, from 2010 to 2013.

It has been claimed that Haggard invented the term 'folk horror'.This appears not to be the case (though the term was invented in regard to his film Blood on Satan's Claw), but his use of it in a 2004 interview in Fangoria magazine does appear to have popularised the term.

== Honours ==
Haggard was appointed Officer of the Order of the British Empire (OBE) in the 2016 New Year Honours for services to film, television and theatre.

== Personal life ==
Haggard had four children by his first marriage, to Christiane Stokes. The couple married in 1960 and later divorced. In 1972, Haggard married stained glass artist Anna Sklovsky, with whom he had two children, including Daisy Haggard.

=== Death ===
Haggard died on 11 January 2023, at the age of 83.

== Selected filmography ==
- Wedding Night (1970)
- The Blood on Satan's Claw (1971)
- The Love School (1975)
- The Quatermass Conclusion (1979)
- The Fiendish Plot of Dr. Fu Manchu (1980)
- Venom (1981)
- A Summer Story (1988)
- Four Eyes and Six Guns (1992)
- Conquest (1998)
