= Rider, British Columbia =

- Railway Point
- Location of Rider in British Columbia
- Coordinates: 53°29′00″N 120°32′00″W
- Country: Canada
- Province: British Columbia
- Regional District: Fraser-Fort George

Rider is a railway point of the Canadian National Railway located west of McBride, British Columbia.

Rider was named after the novelist Sir Henry Rider Haggard, who, in July 1916, travelled from Vancouver to Edmonton along the Grand Trunk Pacific Railway. Prior to 1916 the station was known as "Knole."
