= I Can't... I Can't =

1970 British film by Piers Haggard

- Theatrical release poster
- Directed by: Piers Haggard
- Screenplay by: Robert I. Holt; Lee Dunne
- Based on: Original story by Robert I. Holt
- Starring: Dennis Waterman; Tessa Wyatt; Alexandra Bastedo; Eddie Byrne
- Music by: Cyril Ornadel
- Release date: 1970
- Countries: United Kingdom; Ireland
- Language: English

I Can't... I Can't (also known as Wedding Night), is a 1970 British-Irish film directed by Piers Haggard and starring Dennis Waterman, Tessa Wyatt, Alexandra Bastedo and Eddie Byrne. It was Haggard's directorial debut.

== Plot ==
Following the recent death of her mother in childbirth, a newly married Irish Catholic girl becomes unstable due to fears of marital sex and pregnancy, and refuses to consummate her marriage.

== Cast ==
- Dennis Waterman as Joe O'Reilly
- Tessa Wyatt as Mady O'Reilly
- Alexandra Bastedo as Gloria
- Eddie Byrne as Tom
- Martin Dempsey as Father Keegan
- Marie O'Donnell as Kate
- Patrick Laffan as Dr. Farnum
- Garden Odyssey Enterprise as discotheque group

== Reception ==
The film was a commercial failure but led to Haggard's hiring as director on The Blood on Satan's Claw.

The Monthly Film Bulletin wrote: "It is the film's very Irishness that hampers an already melodramatic script, with Irish settings and players standing in uneasily for the large part of the action supposedly set in London. But the direction is also unvaryingly flat and invests Mady's alternating refusals and flashbacks with more tedium than insight, while the scriptwriters seem to hesitate between stressing the hopelessness of her situation and opting for a conventionally pat solution. In one of the film's most dramatic moments, as Mady is driven to soothe a screaming baby to sleep, it looks as if motherly instinct is about to catapult her into Joe's bed; and the actual conclusion, with its excess of Love Story sentimentality, proves to be almost as unsatisfactory. That Wedding Night manages to attain until this point a measure of plausibility is due largely to a thoughtful, sympathetic performance from Tessa Wyatt, who ably conveys the terror which even the most nobly intended words of comfort ("You're cold. Get into bed") can inadvertently inspire."

Variety wrote: "While it sheds no new light or slant of thought on the topic it certainly isn't in bad taste. Rather, it treats the theme as a hook for an emotional drama and will be a tricky film to sell in touchy areas. ...Yet it's likely to create plenty of interest, notably among women of the younger age groups, more vitally concerned about the ethical pros and cons of the pill. ... A Miss Wyatt, a young TV and legit thesp, making her cinema bow, admits that she found some of the delicate scenes embarrassing to act, but she acquits herself well and, with more experience, could nave a future in British pix. Dennis Waterman who, since Up The Junction [1968], is building a quiet reputation plays the young husband with virility and intelligence, but is short on charm. Miss Bastedo is a lush chick of a temptress. ... I Can't . .. I Can't (bad title) ... could be a sound boxoffice success, except, maybe, in particularly hidebound, church-ridden communities."
