= John Haggard =

English ecclesiastical lawyer (1794–1856)

- Born: 1794; Bradfield, Hertfordshire, England
- Died: 31 October 1856 (aged 61–62); Brighton, England
- Education: Westminster School, Trinity Hall, Cambridge (LL.B. 1813, LL.D. 1818)
- Occupation: Ecclesiastical lawyer
- Known for: Chancellor of three dioceses
- Spouse: Caroline Hodgson (m. 1820)
- Children: Mark Haggard (rower)
- Parent(s): William Henry Haggard; Frances Amyand
- Relatives: Brother: grandfather of H. Rider Haggard; great-grandfather of Vernon Haggard, Godfrey Haggard

John Haggard (1794 – 31 October 1856) was an English ecclesiastical lawyer who was Chancellor of three dioceses.

== Family ==
A member of the Haggard family, he was born at Bradfield, Hertfordshire, the third son of William Henry Haggard (died 1837), of Bradenham Hall, Norfolk, and his wife Frances Amyand, only daughter of the Rev. Thomas Amyand.

On 20 July 1820 he married Caroline Hodgson (died 21 November 1884), daughter of Mark Hodgson of Bromley. Their son Mark was a successful rower during his time at Oxford University and died of tuberculosis in 1854.

Haggard's brother William was the grandfather of the writer Sir H. Rider Haggard and great-grandfather of the naval officer Sir Vernon Haggard and the diplomat Sir Godfrey Haggard.

== Education and career ==
Haggard was educated at Westminster School. He entered Trinity Hall, Cambridge, as a pensioner on 9 June 1807, took his LL.B. degree in 1813 and was elected a Fellow on 1 December 1815. He took his LL.D. in 1818, and on 3 November that year was admitted a Fellow of the College of Doctors of Law, London. He held his fellowship at Trinity Hall until his marriage in 1820.

In 1836 Haggard was appointed chancellor of Lincoln by his college friend Dr. John Kaye, the bishop. He accompanied the bishop in the visitation of his diocese. Haggard was nominated chancellor of Winchester in June 1845, and two years afterwards commissary of Surrey in the same diocese. In 1847 he received the appointment of chancellor of Manchester from James Prince Lee, the first bishop of the diocese.

He died at Brighton at the age of 62.

== Publications ==
- Reports of Cases argued in the Consistory Court of London, containing the Judgments of Sir W. Scott, 1822, 2 vols.
- Reports of Cases argued in the Court of Admiralty during the time of Lord Stowell, 1822–40, 3 vols.
- A Report of the Judgment of Dew v. Clarke, 1826.
- Reports of Cases argued in the Ecclesiastical Courts at Doctors' Commons and in the High Court of Delegates, 1829–32, 4 vols.
- Digest of Cases argued in the Arches and Prerogative Courts of Canterbury and contained in the Reports of J. Haggard, 1835.
