= Denys Corley Smith =

British author and journalist

Denys Corley Smith (9 June 1922 – 21 February 1989) was a British author and journalist.

== Early life ==
Corley Smith was born 9 June 1922 in Bolton, then in Lancashire, the younger son of Thomas Smith (born 1874) a teacher, and Nena Alice Brown (1887–1932). His elder brother was Gerard Corley Smith, who went on to become a British diplomat.

Corley Smith was educated at Bolton School and, like his brother, studied the modern languages tripos (French and German) at Emmanuel College, Cambridge, completing Part I in 1942. During the Second World War he fought with the Manchester Regiment in Italy. The Manchesters saw much action during the Battles for the Gothic Line in August–September 1944, including the Battle of Montegridolfo. At the end of the War he began a newsman's career initially editing a frontline newspaper for the military.

== Journalism ==
In the early 1950s he joined Reuters as a correspondent in Asia. His first assignment was covering the Korean War and he then moved to Saigon until 1956, and then took various other posts before becoming freelance in 1963. He continued to write for a variety of publications and journals including This is Japan where he wrote an article on the Katakana where he mentions that he was a regular visitor to Tokyo.

== Author ==
Corley Smith's first novel was Two Drops of Blood published by Ernest Benn, in 1959. In reviews, this was described as a fast moving novel about the day-to-day lives of foreign correspondents. It is set in Vietnam against the background of the Indo-China War.

The Deep-Freeze Girls was written in collaboration with Eva Defago and was first published by Michael Joseph in the UK, in 1964. Defago - an alumna herself - and Corley Smith took the lid off girls' finishing schools in Switzerland in a comic novel that takes on increasing overtones of pathos as it moves along. A review of the book summarised, "The common “dumping” of wealthy teenage girls from throughout the world into the deep freeze of a Swiss finishing school such as the fictional Pensionnat de Jeunes Filles Villa Joyeuse by what the author regards as “thoughtless, selfish parents” has prompted her to write the book. It's entertaining, if somewhat sensational, and the story is balanced and told with the sometimes amusing idiom of youth." Defago was said to have run a hotel in the Swiss Alps and was an alumnus of such schools.

The novel became a minor best seller and there were plans to turn it into a film starring Nancy Kwan, Sue Lyon and Grayson Hall, and directed by Zoe Clarke-Williams. Jay Weston is quoted as saying, "Ray Stark and I once developed a movie called The Deep Freeze Girls, based upon the novel about a group of spoiled rich girls in a posh boarding school in Switzerland. It was never made when we could not get a suitable script"

Corley Smith is also quoted in the 1967 edition of This is Japan that he had written or was writing a book called Maiko dealing with Kyoto’s apprentice geisha but no record of a published book has been found.

== Death ==
Corley Smith died 21 February 1989 in Foxton, Cambridgeshire, aged 66.
