= John Pine Coffin =

British army officer and colonial governor

Major-General John Pine Coffin

15th Governor of St. Helena
- In office July 1821 – March 1823
- Preceded by: Hudson Lowe
- Succeeded by: Alexander Walker

Personal details
- Born: 16 March 1778 Devon
- Died: 10 February 1830 (aged 51) Bath, Somerset

Military service
- Allegiance: United Kingdom
- Branch/service: British Army
- Rank: Major-General
- Battles/wars: Napoleonic Wars

Major-General John Pine Coffin (1778 – 1830) was an English army officer and colonial administrator who served as Governor of St. Helena 1821–23.

== Life ==
=== Napoleonic Wars ===
John Pine Coffin, fourth son of The Rev. John Pine of Eastdown, Devonshire, who took the name of Coffin in 1797, by his wife, the daughter of James Rowe of Alverdiscot, Devonshire, was born on 16 March 1778. In 1795 he obtained a cornetcy in the 4th Dragoons, in which James Dalbiac and George Scovell were among his brother subalterns, and became lieutenant therein in 1799. He was attached to the quartermaster-general's staff of the army in Egypt in 1801, and was present at the surrender of Cairo and the attack on Alexandria from the westward.

On the formation of the Royal Staff Corps (for engineer and other departmental duties under the quartermaster-general), he was appointed to a company therein, but the year after was promoted to major and removed to the permanent staff of the quartermaster-general's department, in which capacity he was in Dublin at the time of Emmet's insurrection, and continued to serve in Ireland until 1806, afterwards accompanying Lord Cathcart to the Isle of Rugen and in the expedition against Copenhagen in 1807.

In 1808 he was sent to the Mediterranean as deputy quartermaster-general with the rank of lieutenant-colonel, and was employed with the expedition to the Bay of Naples, which ended in the capture of Ischia and Procida. In 1810 he organised the flotilla of gunboats equipped for the defence of the Straits of Messina, when Murat's army was encamped on the opposite shore; and in 1813 he commanded the troops of a battalion of the 10th foot on board the Thames, 32 guns, under Captain afterwards Admiral Sir Charles Napier, and the Furieuse, 36 (18-pounders), under Captain William Mounsey, sent to attack the Isle of Ponza, which was captured by the frigates sailing right into the harbour, under a heavy cross-fire from the shore-batteries, and landing the troops without losing a man. (Note: see William James, Naval History vi. 19.) He was afterwards employed by Lord William Bentinck on staff duties at Tarragona and at Genoa, and attained the rank of brevet-colonel in 1814.

After the renewal of hostilities in 1815, when the Austrian and Piedmontese armies of occupation, a hundred thousand strong, entered France, (Note: see Archibald Alison, History of Europe xiv. 27.) Coffin was attached, in the capacity of British military commissioner with the rank of brigadier-general, to the Austro-Sardinians, who crossed Mont Cenis, and remained with them until they quitted French territory, in accordance with the Treaty of Paris.

=== St. Helena ===
In 1817 he was appointed regimental major of the Royal Staff Corps, at headquarters, Hythe, Kent, and in 1819 was nominated Lieutenant-governor and second in command under Sir Hudson Lowe at St. Helena, in the room of Sir George Bingham, returned home. This portion of Coffin's services has been left unnoticed by most historians and biographers. When Sir Hudson Lowe left the island in July 1821, after the death of the imperial captive, Coffin succeeded to the command, which he held until, the last of the King's troops having been removed, he was relieved, in March 1823, by Brigadier-general Alexander Walker, HEICS, when the government of the island reverted for some years to the East India Company. Coffin's correspondence with the council of the island, which was at first disposed to question his authority, will be found in the archives of the British Library. (Note: British Library Add MS. 20206.) Coffin was advanced to the rank of major-general in 1825.

=== Personal life ===
He married, in 1820, the only daughter of George Monkland, late of Belmont, Bath, by whom he had no issue. He died at Bath on 10 February 1830. Coffin was the English translator of Stutterheim's Account of the Battle of Austerlitz (London, 1806).

== Sources ==
- Burke's Landed Gentry, under "Pine-Coffin";
- The Gentleman's Magazine c. (i.), 369.

The following works may be consulted for details of some of the historic events with which Coffin was connected:

- Sir J. W. Gordon's Military Transactions, London, 1809 (for affairs, in the Baltic);
- Sir H. E. Bunbury's Narrative of Passages in the War with France, 1851 (for some very curious information respecting the expedition to the Bay of Naples and the defence of Sicily);
- Walter Henry's Events of Military Life (for St. Helena).

Coffin's letters to Sir Hudson Lowe, of various dates from 1808 to 1823, will be found in British Library Add MSS 20133, 20139, 20191, 20192, 20206 and 20211.

== See also ==
- Edward Pine Coffin
