= Charles Leirens =

Belgian photographer and musician

Charles Leirens (4 March 1888 – 11 April 1963) was a Belgian photographer and musician. He started giving concerts in public at the age of eight and after studying composition in college composed music for a time. During World War I he worked for the Belgian services in London. In 1928 he became the first Director-General of the Palais des Beaux-Arts, Brussels, creating La Maison d’Art in December 1933; cofounded the Revue Internationale de Musique (1936–1952). He also made photographic portraits of celebrated artists from the 1930s to the 1960s. He spent most of World War II in the United States, teaching, writing and exhibiting his work. After the war, he traveled as a photographer to Puerto Rico and Morocco, before returning to Belgium, remarrying and continuing to perform concerts and exhibit photographic work.

== Early life and career ==
Charles Leirens was born on 4 March 1888 in Ghent, Belgium where he undertook his primary and secondary education. Also in Ghent he received his musical education as a pianist and, at the age of 8, started giving concerts in public. He studied law at the University of Ghent for two years while also studying counterpoint and harmony and began to compose music. He married and lived in Brussels where he had a son.

== Music ==
During the First World War Leirens worked for the Belgian services in London and in 1919 became the secretary of Fondation Universitaire, after which he abandoned musical composition. In 1928 he was the first Director-General of the Palais des Beaux-Arts, Brussels, and organized exhibitions, conferences, events, all considered very brilliant, but too expensive. He had had to leave the post, when the Palais began consigning its activities to specialized auxiliary companies. By creating La Maison d’Art in December 1933 and initiating a vital program of concerts, lectures, exhibitions, Leirens had addressed those who perceived other arts institutions (the Société Philharmonic, for example), as risk-averse and relying too exclusively on international superstars and populist works. During this period he also founded the Revue Internationale de Musique (1936–1952), with Stanislas Dotremont and Jean Absil. He became the first editor of the Revue.

== Portrait photography ==
In the course of his directorial work Leirens met great artists, writers and musicians, and following the example of prominent German photographers, was inspired to make photographic portraits of them, for which he used a Rolleiflex and first published them in 1936. Over his career subjects were to include Jacob Epstein (1929), Roger Fry (1933), August Vermeylen (1934), Andre Gide (1935), Colette (1935 and 1950), François Mauriac (1935, 1957), James Ensor (1933), Paul Valéry (1934), Osip Zadkine (1935), Aristide Maillol (1935), Béla Bartók (1944), Henry Moore (1946), Marc Chagall (1948, 1952), Gaby Casadesus (1950), Jean Cocteau (1957), Charles Leplae (1958), Paul Delvaux (1958), Andre Malraux (1958), Gaston Bachelard (1958), Eugène Ionesco (1958), Franz Hellens (1960), René Magritte (1960)

== WW2 in America ==
With the outbreak of the Second World War, in 1940 Leirens was invited by the New School for Social Research, New York, to give courses in photography and musicology. On the way there, his ship was delayed at Trinidad, resulting in a stay of eleven months, during which he devoted himself to music and photography and held his first exhibition there.

Beginning in 1941 he gave courses and wrote books on Belgian music and on Belgian folklore, at the Belgian Information Centre in New York. He also influenced the American photographer Erich Hartmann. From 11 to 23 October 1943 at Bignou Gallery an exhibition is held, and catalogue published, of his portraits of prominent Europeans

1945, the war over, he traveled to Puerto Rico, then Morocco, making photos that included one, in Morocco in 1948, of children playing house amongst stones they had arranged on the street. It was chosen by curator Edward Steichen for the world-touring Museum of Modern Art exhibition The Family of Man that was seen by 9 million visitors.

== Return to Belgium ==
Returning to Belgium in 1952 Leirens married Virginia Haggard (McNeill) the daughter of a British diplomat, and previously the wife of painter John McNeill, whom Leirens met with Marc Chagall with whom she had lived for seven years, and mother of their son, the actor David McNeil (born 22 June 1946); within three months Chagall had married his housekeeper, Valentina Brodsky and the six-year old David went to live with his mother and step-father. During this time Leirens resided in Paris while also working in Belgium and made an extensive series of portraits of writers, artists and musicians for the Archives of the Ministry of Culture.

In 1954 Leirens health failed and he was an invalid for two years, nursed by his wife Virginia who also learned and maintained his photographic practice. Only gradually did he resume his actIve life, photographing his doctor Cauchoix in 1957. The following year he returned full-time to live in Brussels where he continued his concerts for the Maison d'Art as well as his photographic work, and mentoring his compatriot, the young Yves Auquier (1934-). He fell ill again in 1963 and died that year on April 11.

== Exhibitions ==
=== Solo ===
- 1941 La Trinite, Antilles
- 1943 Bignou Gallery, New York
- 1946 Palais des Beaux-Arts, Bruxelles
- 1949 New School for Social Research (USA)
- 1952 Galerie Giroux, Bruxelles
- 1953 Galerie Arnuad, Paris
- 1958 Galerie du Cheval de Verre, Bruxelles
- 1958 Venlo, Netherlands
- 1959 Librairie des Editions Universelles (B)

=== Group exhibitions ===
- 1955 The Family Of Man, MoMA, N.Y.
- 1959 Groupe Photographie, Bibliothèque Royale, Bruxelles

=== Posthumous exhibitions ===
- 1968 Librairie de la Jeune Parque, Belgium (solo)
- 1974 Galerij Paule Pia, Antwerpen, Belgium (solo)
- 1978 Foyer Culturel, Flobecq, Belgium (solo)
- 1978 Palais des Beaux-Arts, Bruxelles, Belgium (solo)
- 1978 Images Des Hommes, Credit Communal de Belgique (group)
- 1979 Galerie et Fils, Bruxelles (solo)
- 1984 Musee d'Ixelles, Bruxelles (solo)
- 2005, 24 Jun – 18 Sep Belgische Fotografen 1840-2005 FotoMuseum Antwerp (FoMu), Waalse Kaai 47, 2000 Antwerp (group)
- 2010, 24 Oct – 21 Nov Borders/No Borders, Kommunale Galerie Berlin Hohenzollerndamm 176 10713 Berlin (group)
- 2012, September 27 to December 2 The intelligence of the gaze. Portraits of artists: 1933-1960, National Museum of Art of Romania (MNAR) (solo).
- 2011, 4 Feb – 26 Mar Borders/No Borders: Avec des images de la collection du Musée de la Photographie à Charleroi. Centre Culturel Les Chiroux, place des Carmes 8, 4000 Liège. (group)
- 2018 April 28–September 16 Entrechats, Musée de la Photographie, Avenue Paul Pastur 11, 6032 Charleroi, Belgium (group)

== Collections ==
- The collection of the Musée de la photographie à Charleroi, 11 avenue Paul Pastur, (place des Essarts), 6032 Mont-sur-Marchienne, comprises 891 of Leirens' photographs, mostly portraits, from 1933 to 1961. The Numeriques be website of the Musée provides online access to most of Leirens portraits and some personal photographs (watermarked).

== Publications ==
- Leirens, C., & Poulet, R. (1936). 20 portraits d'artistes. Bruxelles: Editions de la Connaissance S.A.
- Leirens, Charles; Belgium Information Center (New York, N.Y.) (1943), Belgian music, Belgian Information Center
- Leirens, Charles (1947), Belgian folklore, Belgian Govt. Information Center
- Jouffroy, A. (1997). L'atelier de Paul Delvaux. Gent: Snoeck-Ducaju.

== Publications about Charles Leirens ==
- Vausort, M. (1991). Charles Leirens: l'intelligence du regard. Musée de la photographie.
