= Virginia Haggard =

British artist and author (1915–2003)

Virginia Edith Haggard
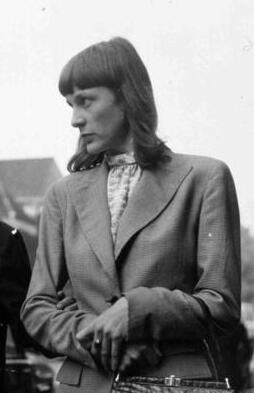
- Born: Virginia Edith Haggard; July 19, 1915; Paris, France
- Died: October 2006 (aged 91); Brussels, Belgium
- Other names: Virginia McNeil, Virginia Leirens
- Citizenship: British
- Occupations: Artist, author, photographer
- Spouses: John McNeil (1935–1951); Charles Leirens (1952–1963 his death)
- Partners: John McNeil (1935–1945); Marc Chagall (1945–1952); Charles Leirens (1952–1963; his death); Henri Storck (1964–1999; his death)
- Children: 2
- Parent: Godfrey Haggard

Virginia Edith Haggard (19 July 1915 – October 2006) was a British artist, author, and photographer. She is known for her seven-year relationship with renowned artist Marc Chagall, as well as her own work as a portrait photographer and writer.

== Early life ==
Virginia Haggard was born on 19 July 1915 in Paris, France, to Sir Godfrey Digby Napier Haggard, a British diplomat, and Georgianna Marie Ruel from Québec, Canada. Her older brother was actor and writer Stephen Haggard. Her upbringing was shaped by her father's diplomatic postings in places such as Bolivia and Cuba. She was fluent in multiple languages and developed an early interest in art.

== Personal life ==
Photo with Marc Chagall in 1948

In 1935, Virginia married Scottish painter John McNeil. The couple had one daughter, Jean McNeil, born in New York City. However, the marriage was troubled due to McNeil's struggles with depression.

In 1945, Virginia met Marc Chagall while working as his housekeeper following the death of his wife Bella. Their relationship quickly evolved into a romantic partnership. The couple moved to High Falls, New York, in 1946 to escape Manhattan and prepare for the birth of their son David. They lived there for two years with Jean and their newborn son.

Their time in High Falls was particularly productive for Chagall. He created over 100 works during this period. In 1948, the family moved to France. However, tensions grew due to Chagall's controlling nature and the demands of his fame. Virginia felt stifled by her role as "the wife of the Famous Artist."

In April 1952, Virginia left Chagall for Belgian photographer Charles Marie Leon Leirens, whom she married later that year. She left behind the 17 pictures Chagall had given to her, keeping books he had inscribed and four small drawings, according to her memoir. She was widowed in 1963. From 1964 until his death in 1999, Virginia lived with Belgian filmmaker Henri Storck. She spent her later years in Brussels. Virginia Haggard Leirens died in Brussels in October 2006 at the age of 91.

== Career and legacy ==
Haggard pursued photography as her primary artistic interest. She became an accomplished portrait photographer and documented many aspects of her life with Chagall through her lens.

In addition to photography, Virginia authored two books: My Life with Chagall: Seven Years of Plenty with the Master (1986), which detailed her life with Chagall, and Lifeline, published posthumously.

In 2005, Haggard was the subject of a documentary film titled "Virginia Haggard-Leirens" by Belgian filmmaker André Colinet. Delaware and Hudson Canal Museum in High Falls, New York, hosted an exhibit from September 2 to October 30, 2011, celebrating the years that Marc Chagall lived in High Falls with Haggard. The "Chagall in High Falls" exhibit has continued to be shown in various New York locations, including the Kingston Library, Elting Memorial Library, and Starr Library.

In 2018, writer Tina Barry initiated "The Virginia Project," an exhibition featuring written works and visual art interpretations inspired by Haggard's life. The project aimed to give voice to Haggard and her daughter Jean McNeil, highlighting their own stories and experiences.

Virginia Haggard's daughter, Jean McNeil, is a painter residing in Wivenhoe, near Colchester, known for her East Anglian landscapes and seascapes. Her son, David McNeil, is a composer, filmmaker, writer, and singer-songwriter, currently living in France.
