= Hoggard =

Hoggard may refer to:

== People ==
- Andrew Hoggard (born 1974 or 1975), New Zealand politician
- Alfonso Hoggard (born 1989), U.S. American football player
- Jacob Hoggard (born 1984), Canadian singer, lead singer of Hedley
- Jay Hoggard (born 1954), American vibraphonist
- Johnathan Hoggard (born 2000), British racing car driver
- Matthew Hoggard (born 1978), British cricketer

== Facilities and structures ==
- John T. Hoggard High School, Wilmington, North Carolina, USA
- Mabel Hoggard Magnet School (elementary school), Clark County, Nevada, USA

== See also ==
- Haggard (disambiguation)
- Hoggar
