= Charles Darwin Research Station =

Field station in Puerto Ayora, Ecuador

Coordinates: 0.741944°S 90.304097°W

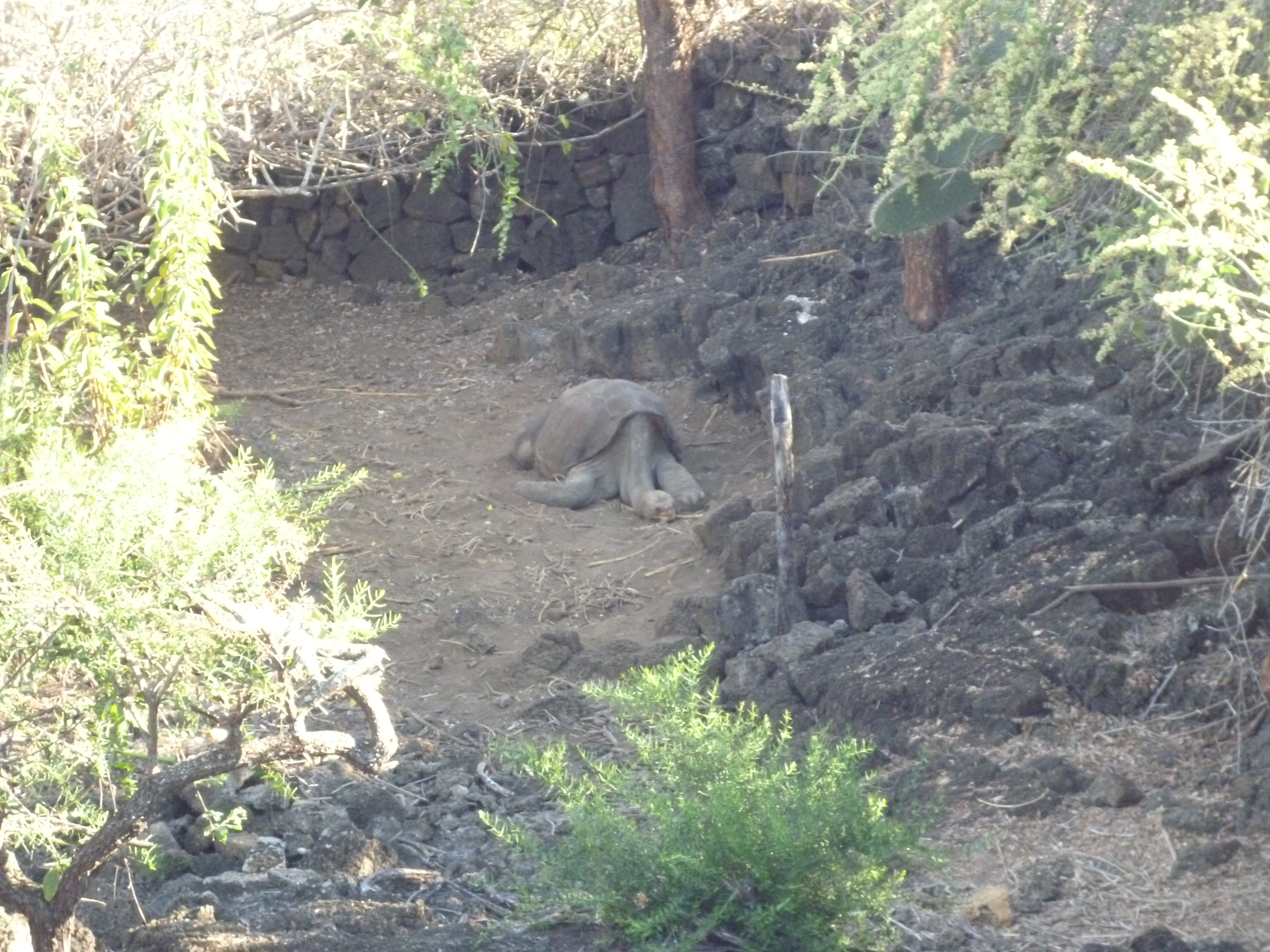
Lonesome George at the Charles Darwin Research Station, estimated to be over 100 years old at his death in 2012

Charles Darwin Research Station (CDRS) (Spanish: Estación Científica Charles Darwin, ECCD) is a biological research station in Puerto Ayora, Santa Cruz Island, Galápagos, Ecuador. The station is operated by the Charles Darwin Foundation which was founded in 1959 under the auspices of UNESCO and the World Conservation Union. The research station serves as the headquarters for the Foundation, and is used to conduct scientific research and promote environmental education. It is located on the shore of Academy Bay in the village of Puerto Ayora on Santa Cruz Island in the Galapagos Islands, with satellite offices on Isabela and San Cristóbal islands.

== Field station ==
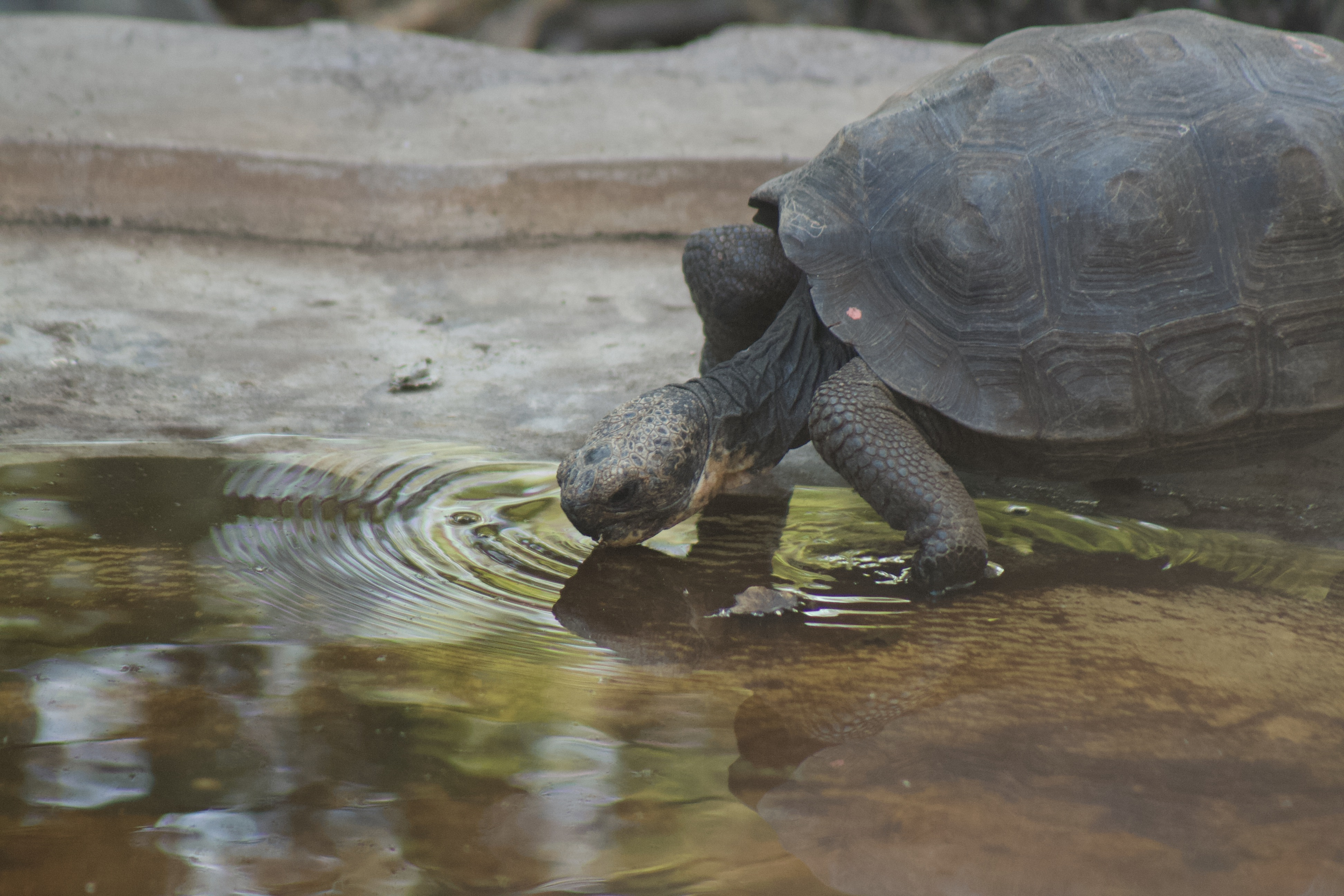
A baby tortoise in the breeding program drinking water

The Charles Darwin Research Station (CDRS) (Spanish: Estación Científica Charles Darwin, ECCD) is a biological research station operated by the Charles Darwin Foundation. It is located on the shore of Academy Bay in the village of Puerto Ayora on Santa Cruz Island in the Galapagos Islands, with satellite offices on Isabela and San Cristóbal islands. In Puerto Ayora, Santa Cruz Island, Ecuadorian and foreign scientists work on research and projects for conservation of the Galápagos terrestrial and marine ecosystems. The Research Station, established in 1959 and dedicated in 1964, has a natural history interpretation center and also carries out educational projects in support of conservation of the Galápagos Islands, and in support of external researchers visiting the islands to conduct field work.

=== Objectives and work ===
The objectives of the CDRS is to conduct scientific research and environmental education for conservation. The Station has a team of over a hundred scientists, educators, volunteers, research students, and support staff from all over the world.

Scientific research and monitoring projects are conducted at the CDRS in conjunction and cooperation with its chief partner, the Galápagos National Park Directorate (GNPD), which functions as the principal government authority in charge of conservation and natural resource issues in the Galapagos.

The work of the CDRS has as its main objectives:

- To promote, facilitate, design, and implement the scientific investigation necessary for the understanding of biological principles, better understanding of ecosystems, and adequate management of the islands’ natural resources.
- To advise the Ecuadorian authorities on the subject of conservation and management of natural resources in the Galapagos Islands.
- To collaborate with Ecuadorian institutions on the implementation of programs involved in scientific investigation and education on the islands.
- To contribute to the development of scientific and technical personnel from Ecuador who are specialized in natural sciences and natural resource management.
- To contribute and collaborate on educational programs related to the conservation of the islands.
- To compile the results of the scientific investigations and the other activities of the organization and to disseminate this information regionally, nationally, and internationally.

In 2002, the Station was awarded the International Cosmos Prize.

== Dispute ==
In December 1972 the entomologist and nature writer Norman Hickin wrote a letter to The Times in which he was highly critical of methods used by the research station. The Foundation was in turn critical of Hickin. Later, however, the station's director, Craig G. MacFarland, acknowledged:

Roger Perry and I handled Dr. Hickin pretty roughly in a radio discussion. This seemed necessary at the time but I have felt vaguely uncomfortable about it ever since as some of his strictures were justified

and that some of the changes Hickin had encouraged had been incorporated into the station's management plan. The foundation promoted Hickin's new book, Animal Life of the Galápagos, by way of an apology.

== Gallery ==
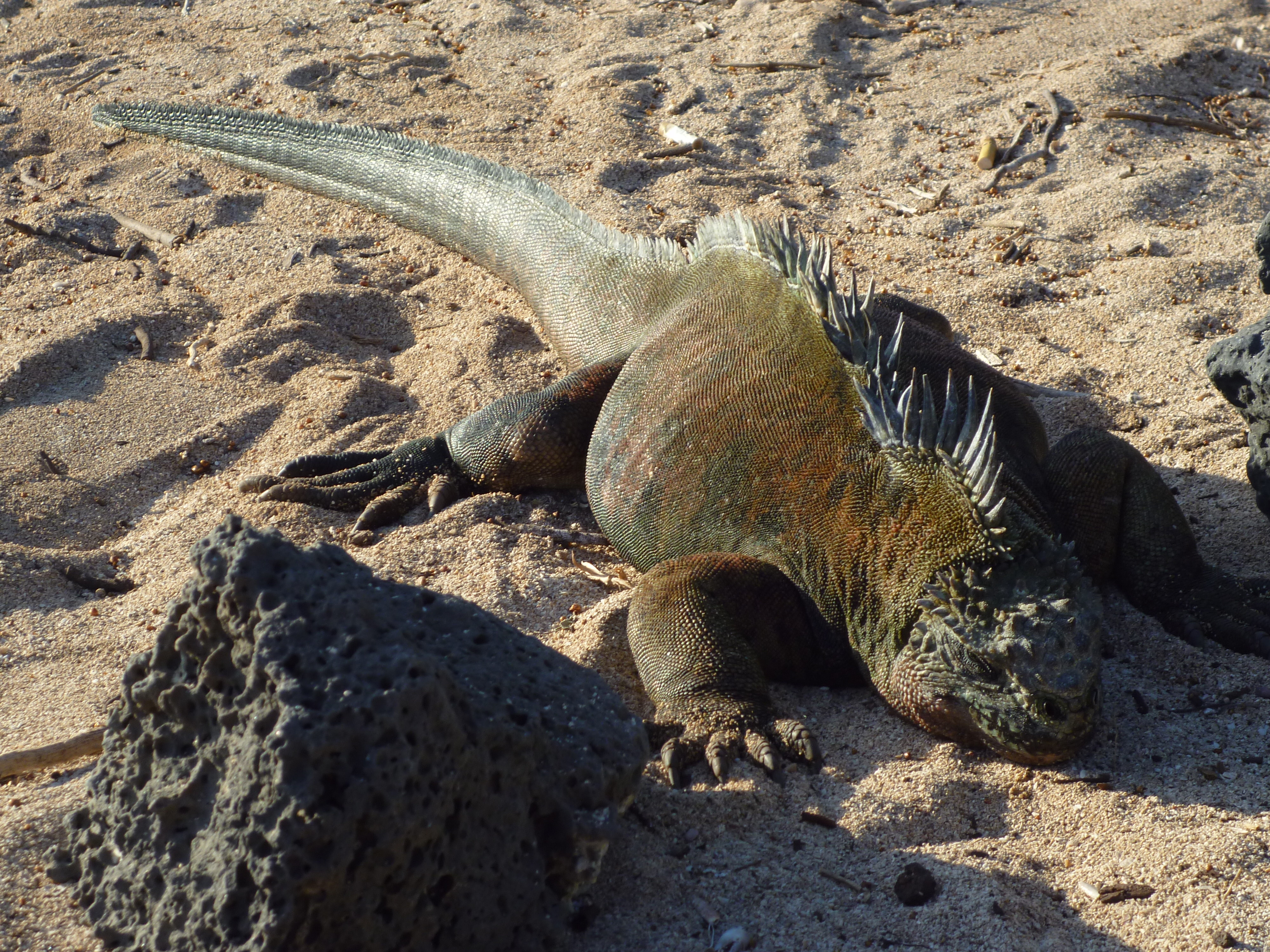
Iguana on the beach at the Charles Darwin Research Station

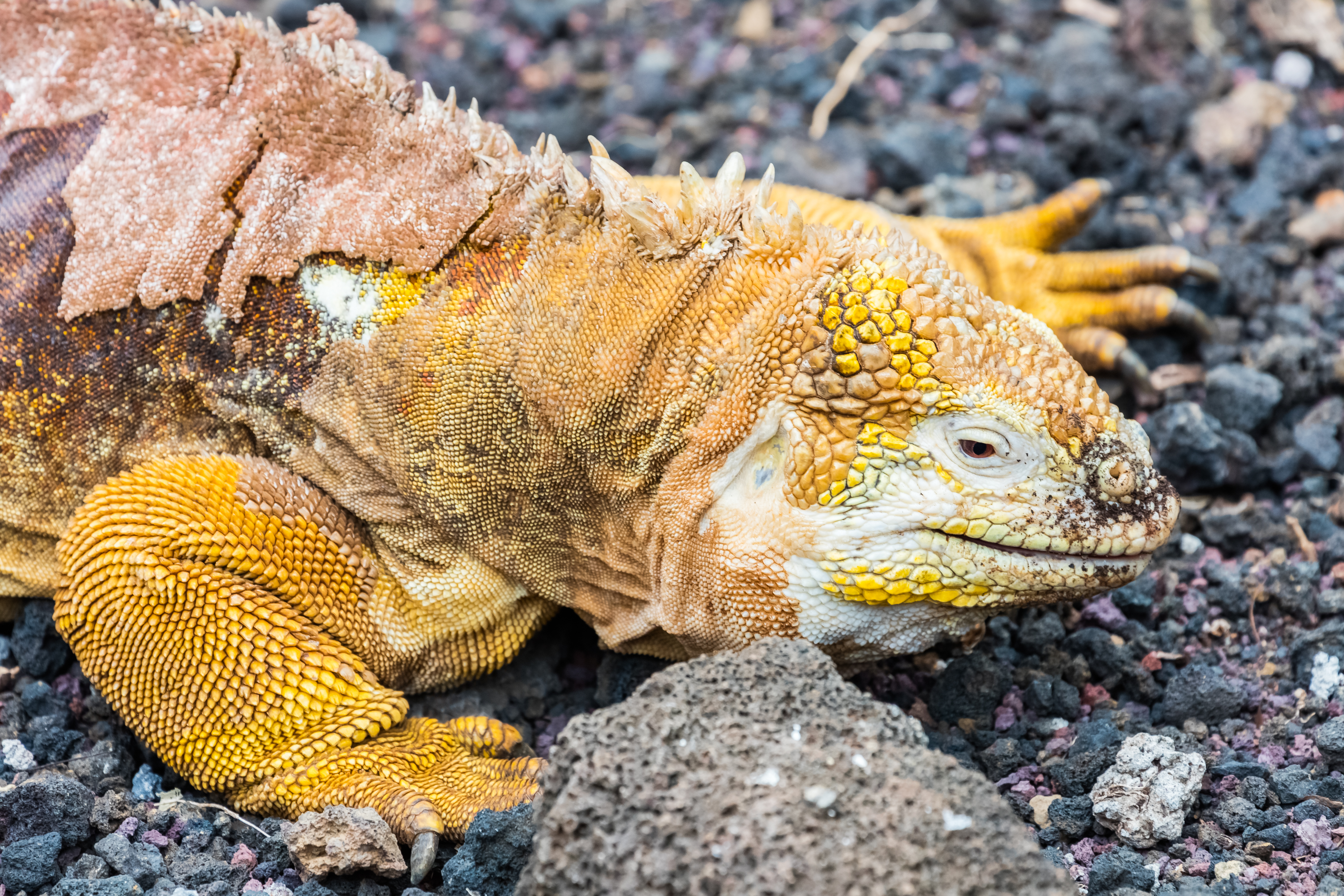
Galapagos Yellow Land Iguana living at the Charles Darwin Research Station

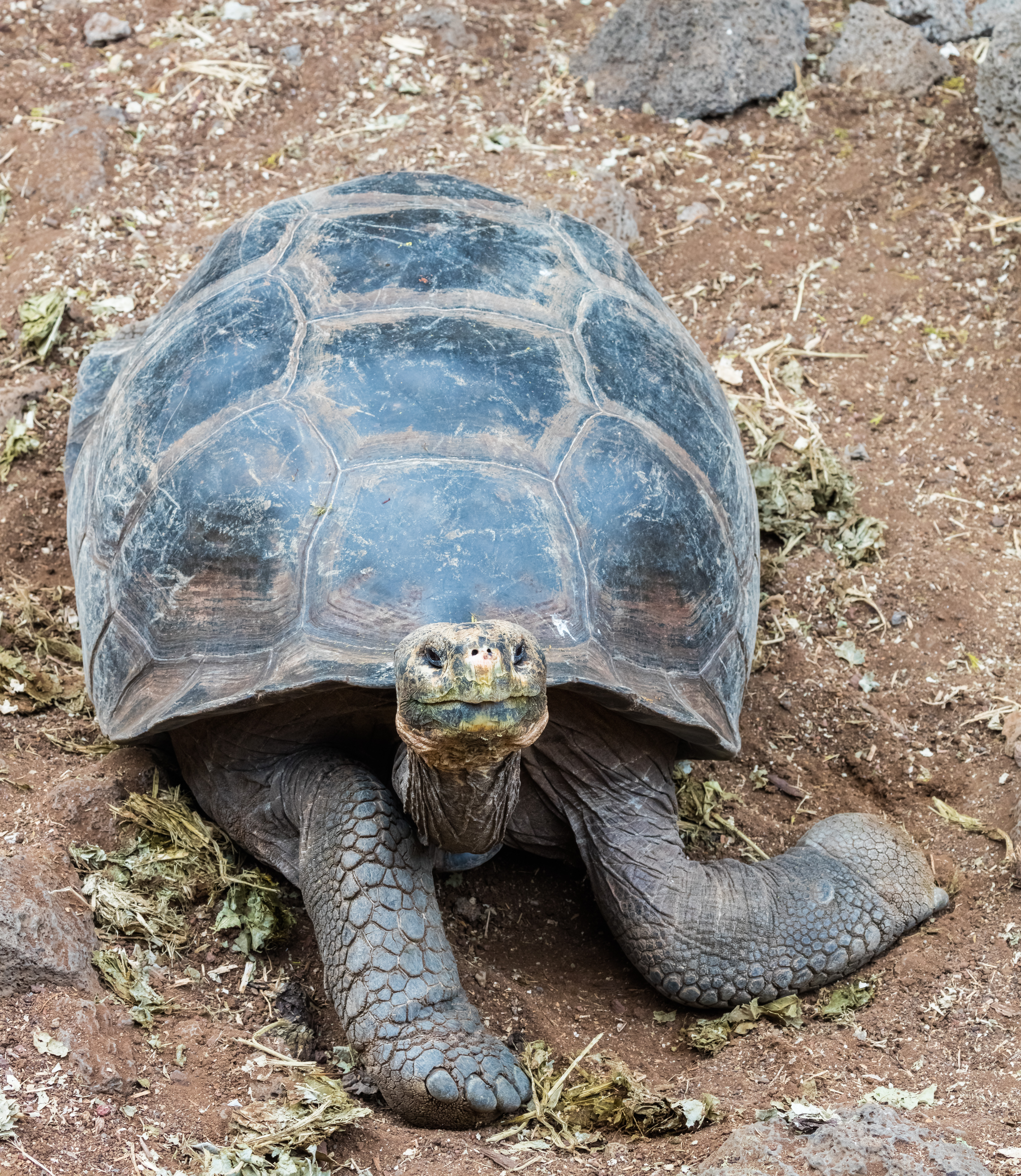
Tortoise at the Charles Darwin Research Station

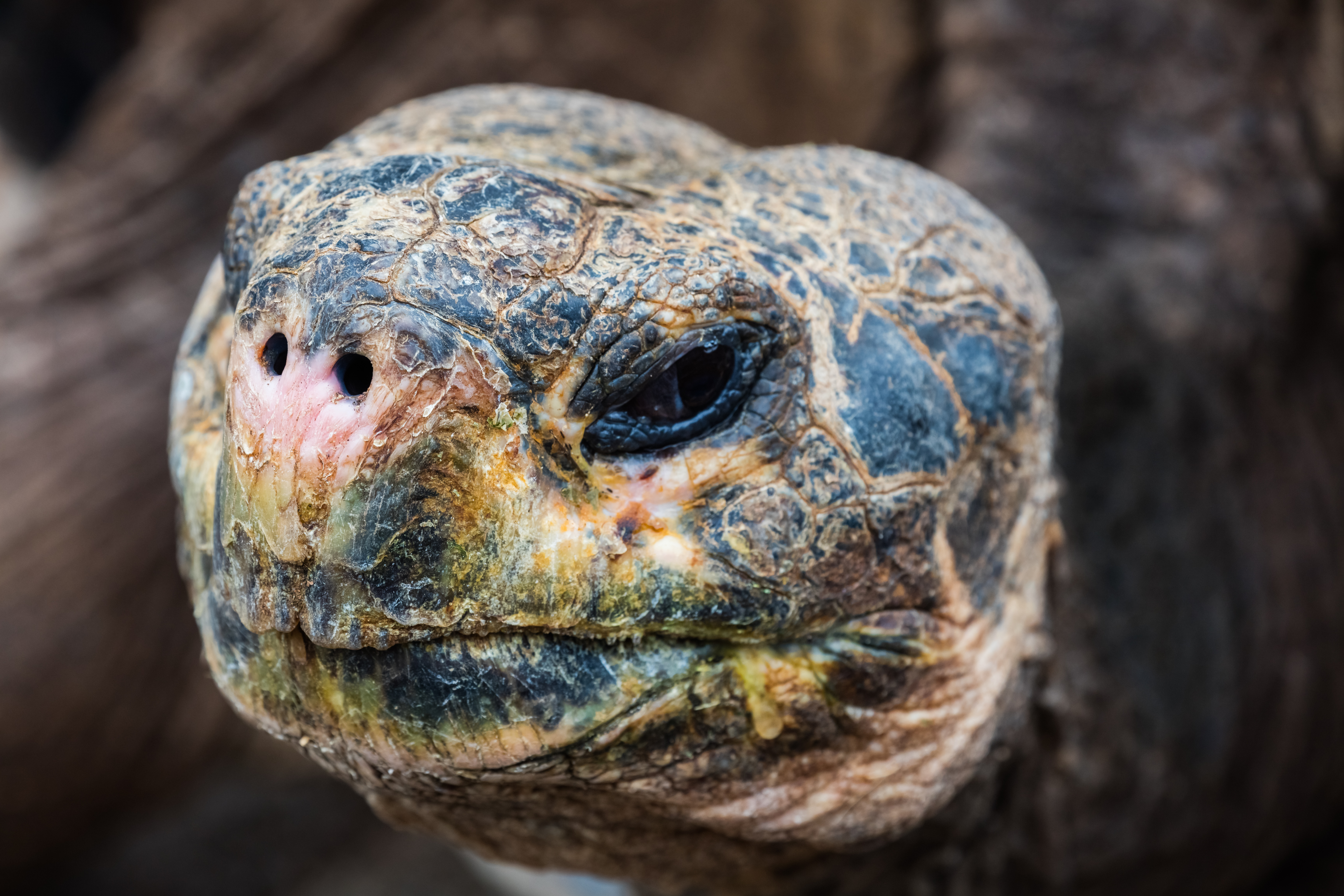
Detail of a tortoise head

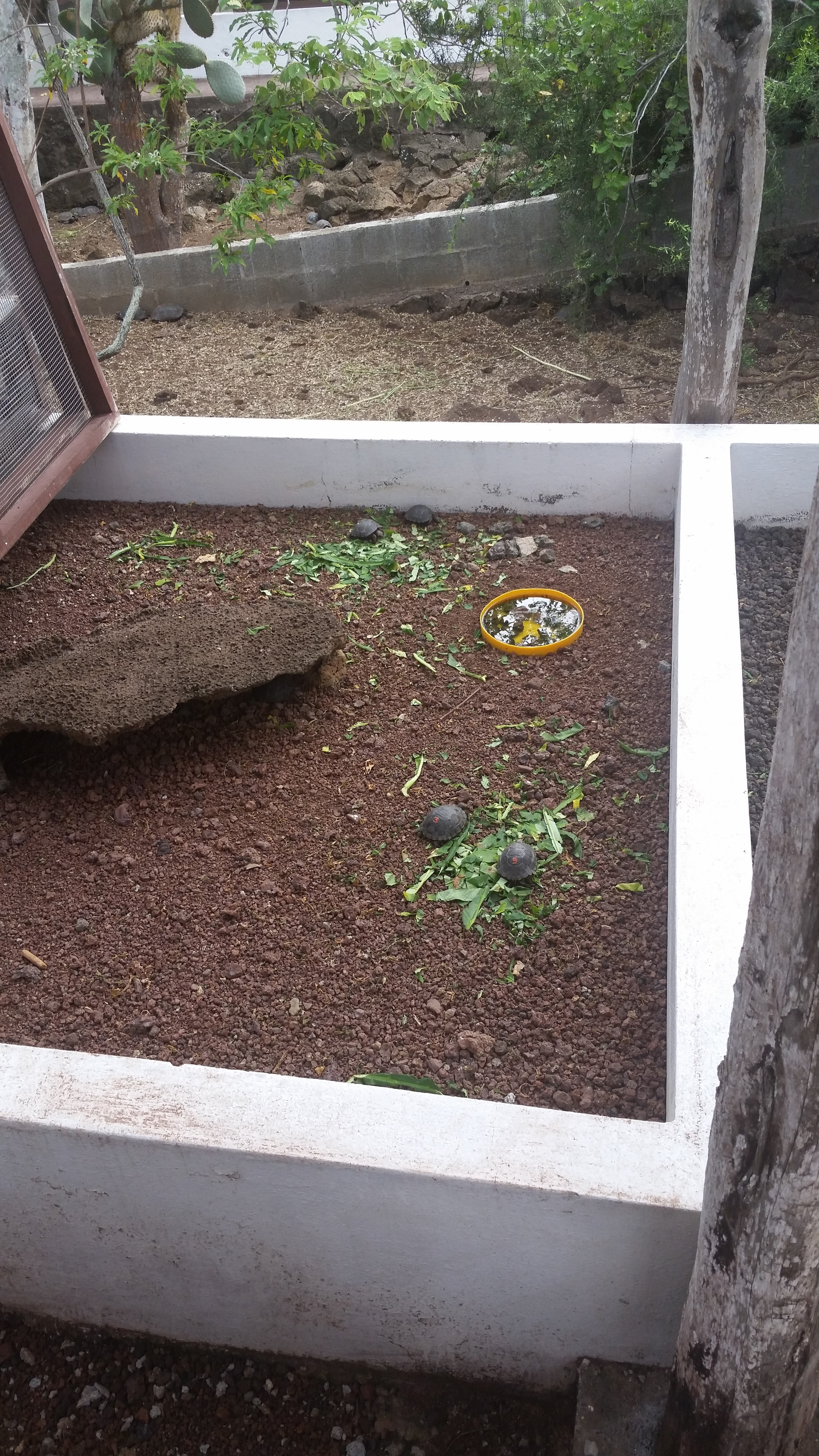
Tortoise nursery

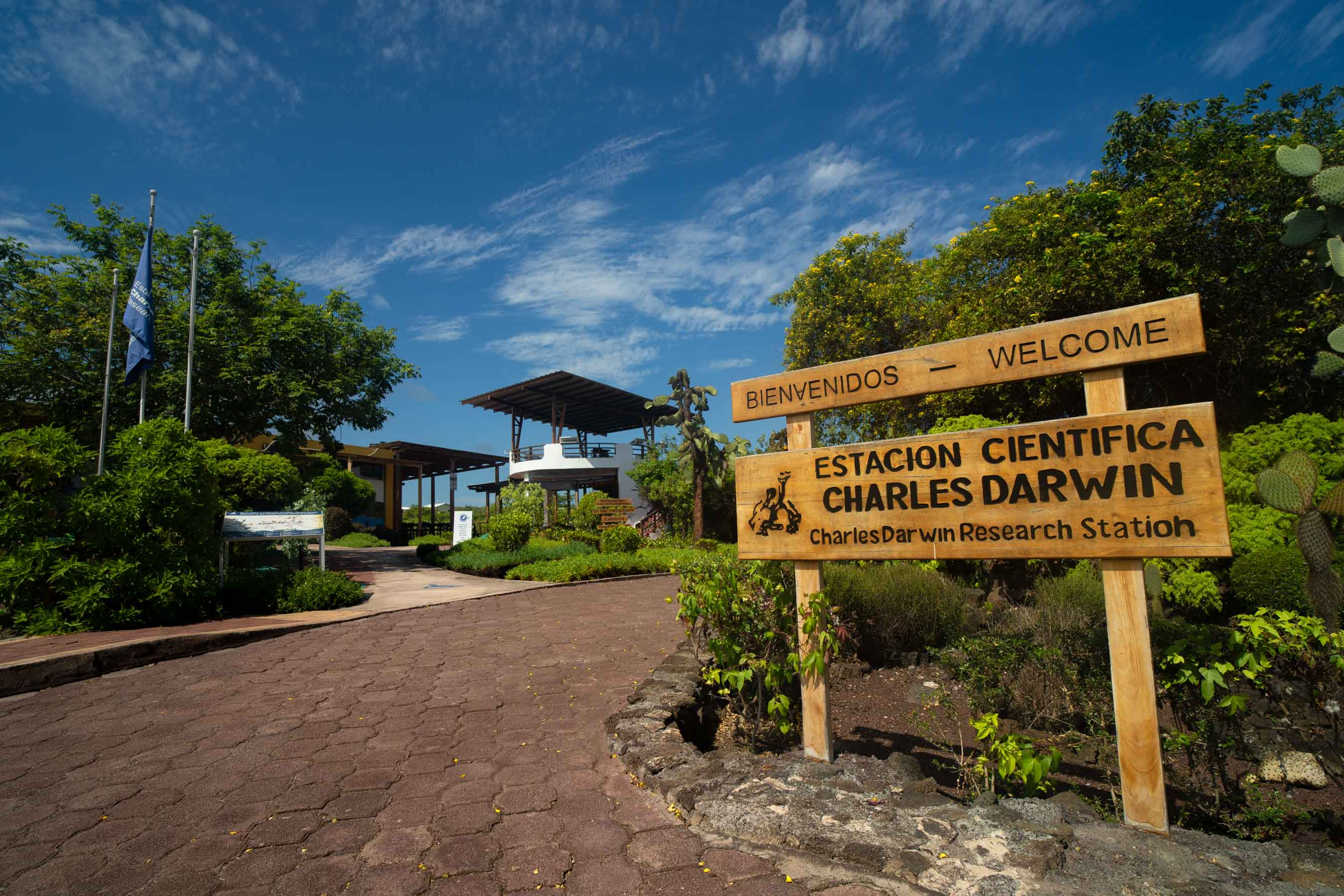
Charles Darwin Research Station Entrance

== See also ==
- Charles Darwin
- Gerard Corley Smith
- Jean Dorst
