= Mark Haggard =

English clergyman and rower

Mark Haggard (1825 – 10 April 1854) was an English clergyman and rower who won events at Henley Royal Regatta.

A member of the Haggard family, he was the son of John Haggard, a lawyer, and his wife Caroline Hodgson. His father was Chancellor of Lincoln, Winchester and Manchester. Haggard was educated at Christ Church, Oxford where he rowed for his college and university. In 1845 he was a member of the Oxford crew in the Boat Race. In 1846 at Henley, Haggard partnered William Milman to win Silver Wherries, beating Thomas Howard Fellows and his brother. He was also a member of the Oxford coxed four which won the Stewards' Challenge Cup. In 1847 he was a member of the Oxford eight which won the Grand Challenge Cup at Henley, beating Cambridge in a year when there was no Boat Race at Putney. He was also in the Christ Church four which won the Stewards' Challenge Cup in a row-over. In 1848 at Henley Haggard repeated the Grand Challenge Cup and Stewards' Challenge Cup wins, and also won the Silver Wherries with Milman again, when LD Bruce and S Wallace, their opponents in the final were disqualified.

Haggard took Holy Orders. He died aged 29 of consumption at sea on the voyage home from Madeira.

== See also ==
- List of Oxford University Boat Race crews
