= Kenneth Haggard =

American architect

Kenneth L. Haggard (born 1935) is an American architect, educator, and solar pioneer who has designed more than 300 buildings and seen more than 200 of his designs built. He is a licensed architect in California and Florida. He and his partner Polly Cooper were awarded the American Solar Energy Society Passive Solar Pioneer Award in 1996. They have been leaders in both passive solar architecture and the rediscovery of straw bale building.

== Early life ==
As a child, Haggard was influenced by his father, a landscape architect who ran a Civilian Conservation Corps camp during The Great Depression. After his retirement, his father concentrated on restoring the landscape of a burned-out peanut farm in south Texas, resulting in the restoration of a mixed Savannah grassland ecosystem. Haggard grew up with Texas dust, heat, oil wells, rainwater harvesting, hot springs, and cottonmouths. After a BS in chemical engineering and service in the US Army, he changed career paths to architecture and design with a BA at NC State, and then a Masters in Urban Design at the University of Pennsylvania. After stints as both a planner and designer, he became a teacher while maintaining a design practice. From 1967 to 1988, he taught at California Polytechnic State University at San Luis Obispo. In the summer of 1970, he taught in Bangladesh. This experience changed his approach to design and architecture and led to his lifelong commitment to design for the real world.

== Career ==
From 1972 to 1975, he was the Principal Investigator for a Research Evaluation of a System of Natural Air-Conditioning funded by the United States Department of Housing and Urban Development. This project built and tested the first 100% naturally heated and cooled home in the country.

In 1975, Haggard met Polly Cooper at Cal Poly, beginning a long productive partnership. They became a voice for a more sustainable approach to architectural design and the education of architects at Cal Poly. In 1976, they established their architectural practice, specializing in site-responsive design that takes advantage of on-site thermal sources and sinks and on-site energies to provide solar heating, natural cooling and ventilation, and day lighting. In later years, their emphasis has broadened to include a wide range of sustainable design issues, including sustainable materials, rainwater harvesting, and regenerative landscapes. By combining different perspectives, the practice achieved more comprehensive, integrated decisions.

Haggard was Co-principal Investigator on a project for the California Energy Commission, that led to the development of the Passive Solar Handbook for California in 1980. From 1984 to 1988, he was the founder and Director of the Renewable Energy Institute at Cal Poly. After retiring from Cal Poly, the work at the San Luis Sustainability Group intensified, with projects ranging from home and commercial remodels to new homes, schools, and commercial buildings.

In 1993, their office and home were destroyed in a wildfire. Resulting in the loss of all their records, plans and photographs and artwork. As a result, they designed and built a model passive solar off-grid office and home using renewable materials such as straw bales and wood milled from the fire killed trees.

As the early 2000s the San Luis Obispo Sustainability Group began to focus on public buildings that could enhance the understanding of a passive solar design and sustainable building materials. This included several pivotal projects, such as the Wolken Education Center at Hidden Villa in Los Altos, the Congregation Beth David Synagogue, and the San Luis Obispo Botanic Garden Education Center. For the design of Congregation Beth David Synagogue they skilfully used passive solar architecture to eliminate a central HVAC system and also cost no more than a conventional building. Energy use is 90% below state code requirements and the rabbi and members appreciate the beauty, comfort and savings the building provides.

Beginning in 2006 Haggard began to focus on education and writing after he realized that buildings use 72% of America's electricity and generate 40% of the global warming gases.

Books assumed more importance than projects as the growing global heating crisis made it clear that every architect and designer needs to understand how to design buildings that used 90% less energy but were more comfortable and secure.

== Representative projects ==
Natural space conditioning with passive solar heating, microclimate-based cooling, daylighting and natural ventilation have been fundamental concerns of Ken Haggard and the San Luis Obispo Sustainability Group.

1972-1975: Prototype Roof Pond House. This solar house was built in 1972 as a prototype for the roof pond system of heating and cooling invented by Harold Hay. Several aspects distinguish the project:

- First documented 100 percent heated and cooled passive solar building.
- Only instrumented solar house in operation during the 1973 energy crisis.
- First comprehensive interdisciplinary evaluation of a passive solar building.
- First application of computer-aided simulation modelling of passive solar building performance, done by Phil Niles, PE.

1976: Energy-Efficient Office Building SLOSG's design of an energy-efficient state office building, with Christie Coffin, Phil Niles, Jake Feldman and Jens Pohl, was an Award of Merit winner in the California Energy-Efficient Office Building Competition. In addition to illustrating the application of the roof pond system to larger buildings, the design addressed urbanism and human-scale issues now referred to as "The New Urbanism."

1978-1980: Passive Solar Handbook for California. This handbook by Ken Haggard and Phil Niles, sponsored and published by the California Energy Commission, was designed to make it easier for architects in the state to design passive solar buildings. As part of this handbook, Niles designed the Cal Pas prediction model. This model became the basis of the performance standards in the then-new California Title 24 energy code and the basis of most passive solar performance models.

1976-1990: Passive Solar Residences. The rise of the fossil fools in the 1980s saw solar architecture increasingly viewed as redundant and unfashionable. SLOSG survived by remaining small, with low overhead. During this period, the firm designed 160 solar buildings, mostly residences.

1991-1994: Green Materials and Social Aspects In the early '90s, SLOSG expanded its design considerations to include green materials and the social aspects of building.

Noland House, Anchor Ranch, Lone Pine, Calif. This project, in collaboration with eco-pioneer Pliny Fisk, combined passive heating and cooling with broad resource, health and metabolism issues for a move toward sustainability. The first permitted straw bale building in California, it featured composting toilets and processed wastewater with an interior microbial bed filter/marsh system.

Tierra Nueva CoHousing Community, Oceano, Calif. This project, 27 units plus the Common House, illustrated that passive solar principles could be applied to a dense, socially cohesive situation.

1994: AIA and IUE Sustainable Communities Competition This entry, a collaboration between SLOSG and faculty from Cal Poly, was one of the first-place winners in this international competition. It proposed processes for Los Osos, a community of 15,000, to evolve into a sustainable community:

- Regeneration of the watershed of Los Osos Valley.
- A structure for developing a sustainable economy.
- Diversity in transportation, housing types and community infrastructure.
- A community center consisting of civic facilities.

combined with a resource-recovery facility and open space.

1991-2000: Firm Expansion SLOSG operates an off-grid, straw bale passive solar complex near Santa Margarita, Calif. During this period, the firm expanded into campus planning, education buildings for nonprofit groups, landscape regeneration and the politics of sustainability on the Central California coast.

2000 to Present: Education and Passive Solar Public Buildings Green design comes of age as its critical importance becomes increasingly obvious. SLOSG's projects include the San Luis Obispo Botanical Garden Education Center, Congregation Beth David Synagogue and the Mountainbrook Community Church—all registered with the U.S. Green Building Council for LEED certification. Books and articles on passive solar architecture include local, national and international publications.
