= Haggard family =

The Haggard family is an English family associated with Bradenham Hall in Norfolk that was involved in several areas of public life. Members include:

- William Debonaire Haggard (1787−1866), banker, cousin of John
- John Haggard (1794−1856), lawyer, cousin of William, father of Mark and great-uncle of Henry
- Mark Haggard (1825−1854), clergyman and rower, son of John
- Sir Henry Rider Haggard (1856−1925), writer, great-nephew of John and father of Lilias
- Sir Vernon Harry Stuart Haggard (1874−1960), naval officer, nephew of Henry, brother of Godfrey and father of Hugh
- Sir Godfrey Digby Napier Haggard (1884−1969), diplomat, nephew of Henry, brother of Vernon and father of Stephen
- Lilias Margitson Rider Haggard, (1892−1968), writer, daughter of Henry and cousin of Vernon and Godfrey
- Hugh Alfred Vernon Haggard (1908−1991), naval officer, son of Vernon
- Stephen Hubert Avenel Haggard (1911−1943), actor and writer, son of Godfrey and father of Piers
- Piers Inigo Haggard (1939−2023), theater and film director, son of Stephen and father of Daisy
- Celia Daisy Morna Haggard (born 1978), actress, daughter of Piers
