= H. Rider Haggard =

English adventure novelist (1856–1925)

Sir H. Rider Haggard KBE
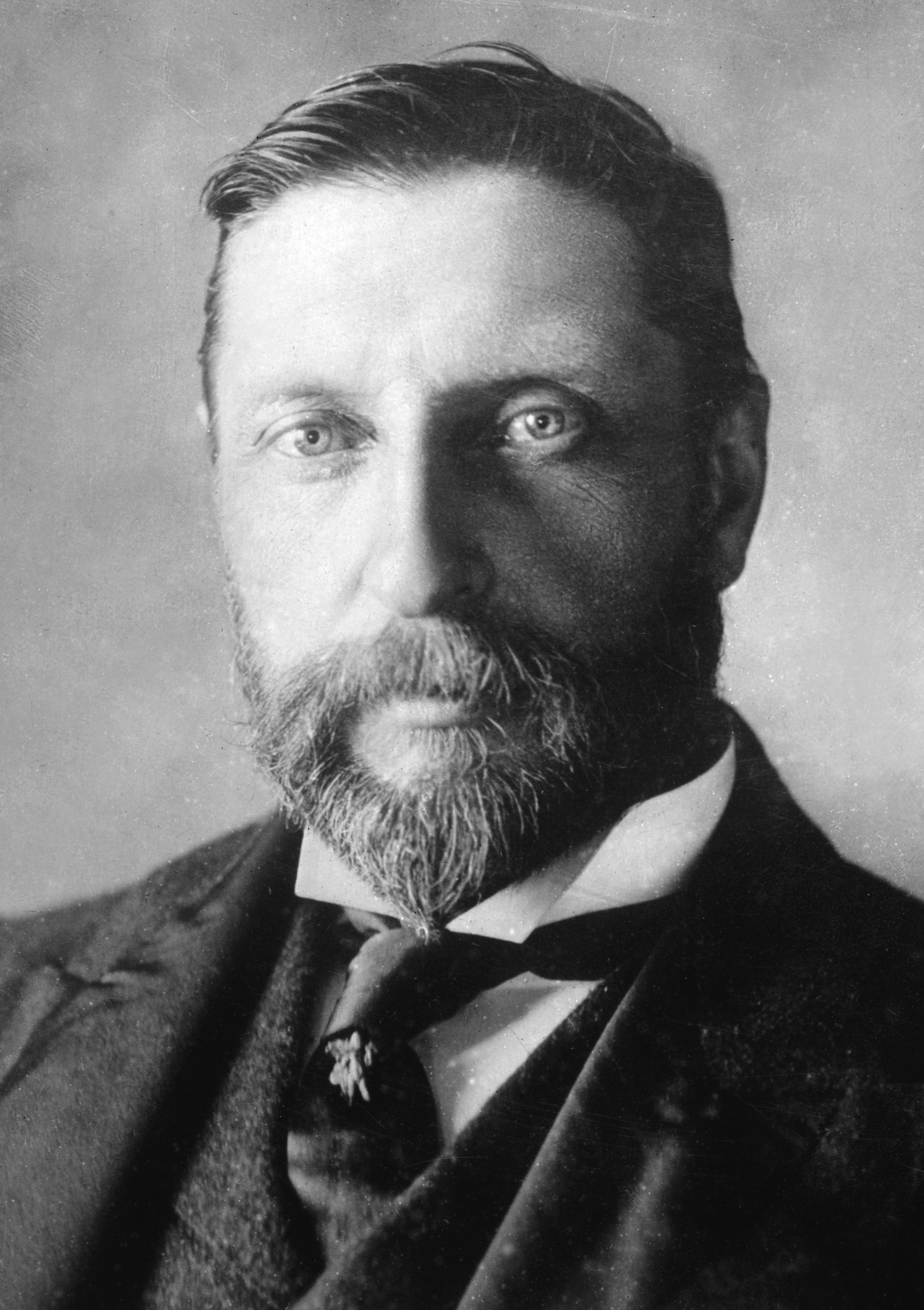
- Haggard, c. 1905
- Born: Henry Rider Haggard; 22 June 1856; Bradenham, Norfolk, England
- Died: 14 May 1925 (aged 68); Marylebone, London, England
- Resting place: St. Mary's Church, Ditchingham, Norfolk, England
- Occupations: Novelist, scholar
- Writing career
- Period: 19th and 20th century
- Genres: Adventure, fantasy, fables, romance, sci-fi, historical
- Subjects: Africa, Ancient Egypt
- Notable works: King Solomon's Mines, Allan Quatermain series, She
- Website: www.riderhaggardsociety.org.uk

Sir Henry Rider Haggard (/ˈhæɡərd/; 22 June 1856 – 14 May 1925) was an English writer of adventure fiction romances set in exotic locations, predominantly Africa, and a pioneer of the lost world literary genre. He was also involved in land reform throughout the British Empire. His stories, situated at the lighter end of Victorian literature and including the eighteen Allan Quatermain stories beginning with King Solomon's Mines, continue to be popular and influential.

== Life and career ==
=== Family ===
Henry Rider Haggard, generally known as H. Rider Haggard or Rider Haggard, was born at Bradenham, Norfolk, the eighth of ten children, to William Meybohm Rider Haggard, a barrister, and Ella Doveton, an author and poet. His father was born in Saint Petersburg, Russia, in 1817 to British parents.

A member of the Haggard family, he was the great-nephew of the ecclesiastical lawyer John Haggard and an uncle of the naval officer Admiral Sir Vernon Haggard and the diplomat Sir Godfrey Haggard.

=== Education ===
Haggard was initially sent to Garsington Rectory in Oxfordshire to study under Reverend H. J. Graham, but, unlike his elder brothers, who graduated from various private schools, he attended Ipswich Grammar School. This was because his father, who perhaps regarded him as somebody who was not going to amount to much, could no longer afford to maintain his expensive private education. After failing his army entrance exam, he was sent to a private crammer in London to prepare for the entrance exam for the British Foreign Office, which he never sat. During his two years in London he came into contact with people interested in the study of psychic phenomena.

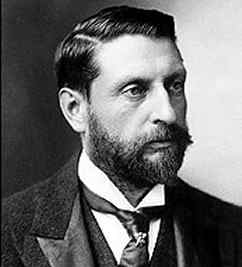
Portrait of H. Rider Haggard c. 1902

=== South Africa, 1875–1882 ===
In 1875, Haggard's father sent him to what is now South Africa to take up an unpaid position as assistant to the secretary to Sir Henry Bulwer, Lieutenant-Governor of the Colony of Natal. In 1876, he was transferred to the staff of Sir Theophilus Shepstone, Special Commissioner for the Transvaal. It was in this role that Haggard was present in Pretoria in April 1877 for the official announcement of the British annexation of the Boer Republic of the Transvaal. Indeed, Haggard raised the Union Flag and read out much of the proclamation following the loss of voice of the official originally entrusted with the duty.

At about that time, Haggard fell in love with Mary Elizabeth "Lilly" Jackson, whom he intended to marry once he obtained paid employment in Africa. In 1878, he became Registrar of the High Court in the Transvaal, and wrote to his father informing him that he intended to return to England and marry her. His father forbade it until Haggard had made a career for himself, and by 1879 Jackson had married Frank Archer, a well-to-do banker. When Haggard eventually returned to England, he married a friend of his sister, Marianna Louisa Margitson (1859–1943) in 1880, and the couple travelled to Africa together. They had a son named Jack (born 1881, died of measles at age 10) and three daughters, Angela (1883-1973), Dorothy (1884-1946) and Lilias (1892-1968). Lilias Rider Haggard became an author, edited The Rabbit Skin Cap and I Walked By Night, and wrote a biography of her father titled The Cloak That I Left (published in 1951).

=== In England, 1882–1925 ===
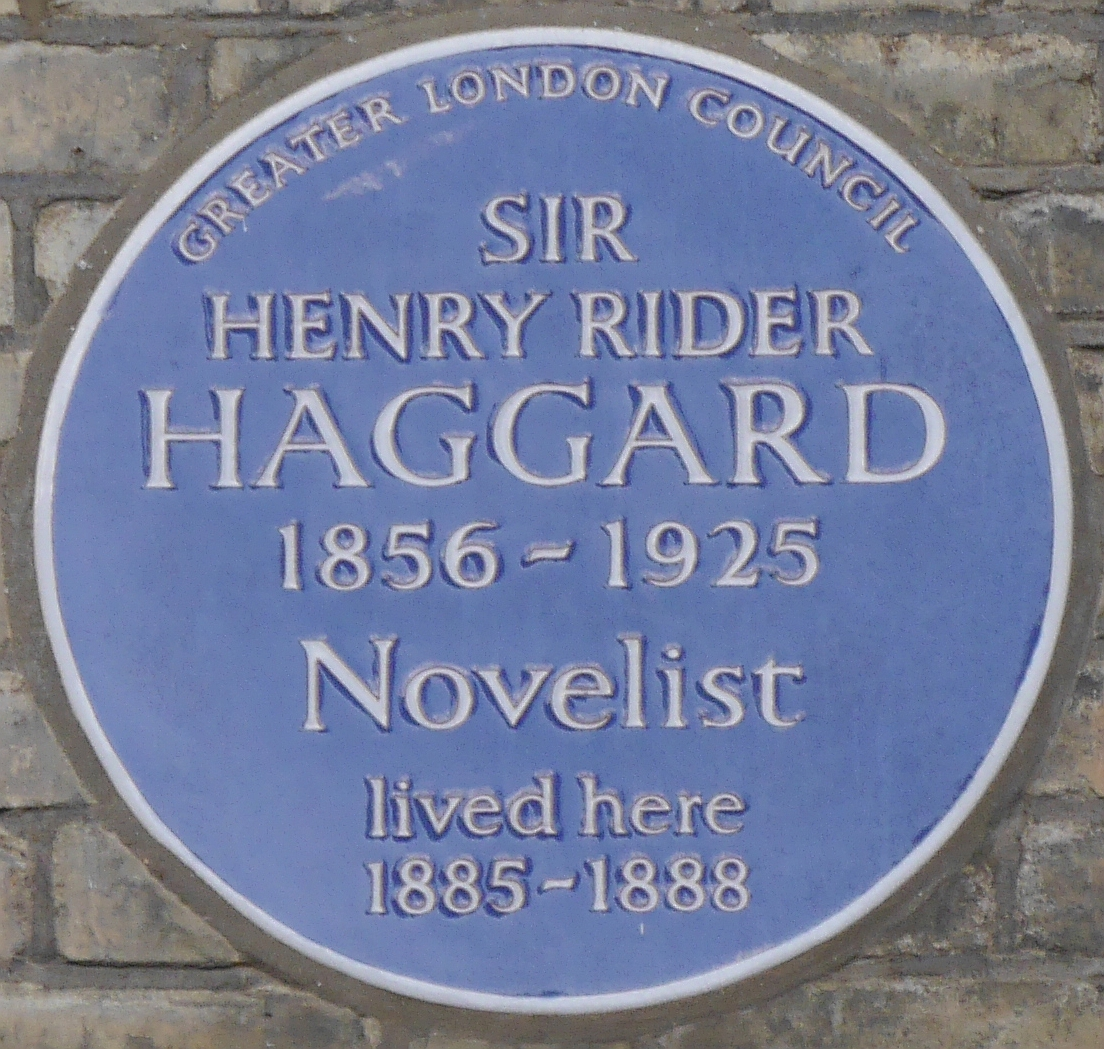
Blue plaque, 69 Gunterstone Road, London

Moving back to England in 1882, the couple settled in Ditchingham, Norfolk, Louisa Margitson's ancestral home. Later they lived in Kessingland and had connections with the church in Bungay, Suffolk. Haggard turned to the study of law and was called to the bar in 1884. His practice of law was desultory and much of his time was taken up by the writing of novels, which he saw as being more profitable. Haggard lived at 69 Gunterstone Road in Hammersmith, London, from mid-1885 to circa April 1888. It was at this Hammersmith address that he completed King Solomon's Mines, published that September.

Haggard was heavily influenced by the larger-than-life adventurers whom he met in colonial Africa, most notably Frederick Selous and Frederick Russell Burnham. He created his Allan Quatermain adventures under their influence, during a time when great mineral wealth was being discovered in Africa, as well as the ruins of ancient lost civilisations of the continent such as Great Zimbabwe.

Three of his books, The Wizard (1896), Black Heart and White Heart; a Zulu Idyll (1896), and Elissa; the Doom of Zimbabwe (1898), are dedicated to Burnham's daughter Nada, the first white child born in Bulawayo; she had been named after Haggard's 1892 book Nada the Lily. Haggard belonged to the Athenaeum, Savile, and Authors' clubs.

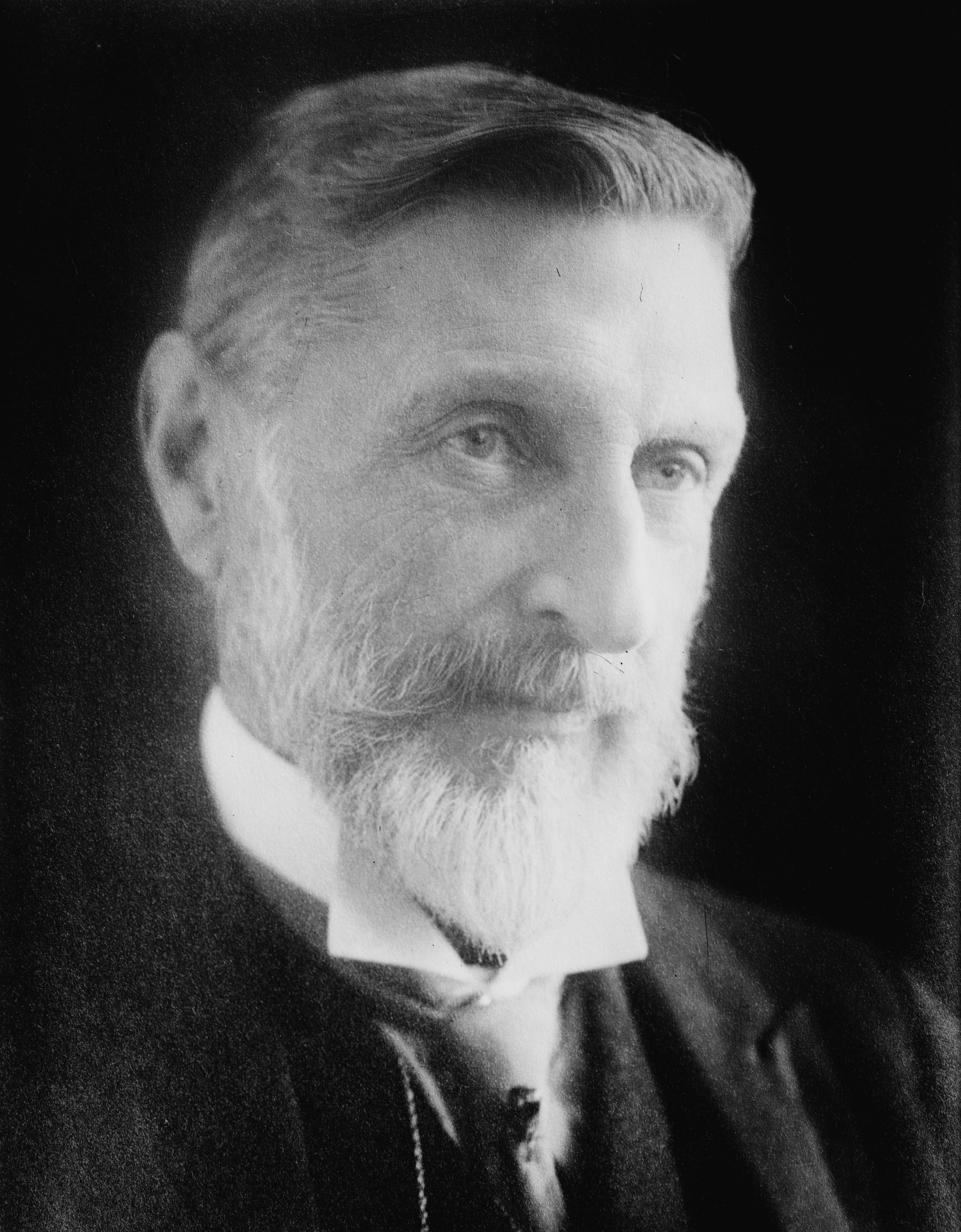
H. Rider Haggard in later life; undated picture taken after c. 1919

=== Aid for Lilly Archer ===
Years later, when Haggard was a successful novelist, he was contacted by his former love, Lilly Archer, née Jackson. She had been deserted by her husband, who had embezzled funds entrusted to him and had fled bankrupt to Africa. Haggard installed her and her sons in a house and saw to the children's education. Lilly eventually followed her husband to Africa, where he infected her with syphilis before dying of it himself. Lilly returned to England in late 1907, where Haggard again supported her until her death on 22 April 1909. These details were not generally known until the publication of Haggard's 1981 biography by Sydney Higgins.

=== Writing career ===
After returning to England in 1882, Haggard published a book on the political situation in South Africa, as well as a handful of unsuccessful novels, before writing King Solomon's Mines. He accepted a 10 percent royalty rather than £100 for the copyright.

A sequel soon followed entitled Allan Quatermain, followed by She and its sequel Ayesha, swashbuckling adventure novels set in the context of the Scramble for Africa (although the action of Ayesha happens in Tibet). The hugely popular King Solomon's Mines is sometimes considered the first of the Lost World genre. She is generally considered to be one of the classics of imaginative literature, and with 83 million copies sold by 1965, it is one of the best-selling books in history. He also wrote Nada the Lily (a tale of adventure among the Zulus) and the epic Viking romance Eric Brighteyes.

His novels portray many of the stereotypes associated with colonialism, yet they are unusual for the degree of sympathy with which the indigenous populations are portrayed. Africans often play heroic roles in the novels, although the protagonists are typically European. Notable examples are the heroic Zulu warrior Umslopogaas, and Ignosi, the rightful king of Kukuanaland, in King Solomon's Mines. Having developed an intense mutual friendship with the three Englishmen who help him regain his throne, he accepts their advice and abolishes witch-hunts and arbitrary capital punishment.

Three of Haggard's novels were written in collaboration with his friend Andrew Lang, who shared his interest in the spiritual realm and paranormal phenomena.

Haggard also wrote about agricultural and social reform, in part inspired by his experiences in Africa, but also based on what he saw in Europe. At the end of his life, he was a staunch opponent of Bolshevism, a position that he shared with his friend Rudyard Kipling. The two had bonded upon Kipling's arrival at London in 1889, largely on the strength of their shared opinions, and remained lifelong friends.

=== Public affairs ===
Haggard was involved in reforming agriculture and was a member of many commissions on land use and related affairs, work that involved several trips to the Colonies and Dominions. It eventually led to the passage of the Development and Road Improvement Funds Act 1909.

He stood unsuccessfully for Parliament as a Conservative candidate for the Eastern division of Norfolk in the 1895 summer election, losing by 197 votes. He was appointed a Knight Bachelor in 1912 and a Knight Commander of the Order of the British Empire (KBE) in the 1919 New Year Honours.

=== Death ===
Sir Rider Haggard died on 14 May 1925 in Marylebone, London, aged 68. His ashes were buried at St Mary's Church, Ditchingham. His papers are held at the Norfolk Record Office. His relatives include the writer Stephen Haggard (great-nephew), the director Piers Haggard (great-great-nephew), and the actress Daisy Haggard (great-great-great-niece).

== Legacy ==
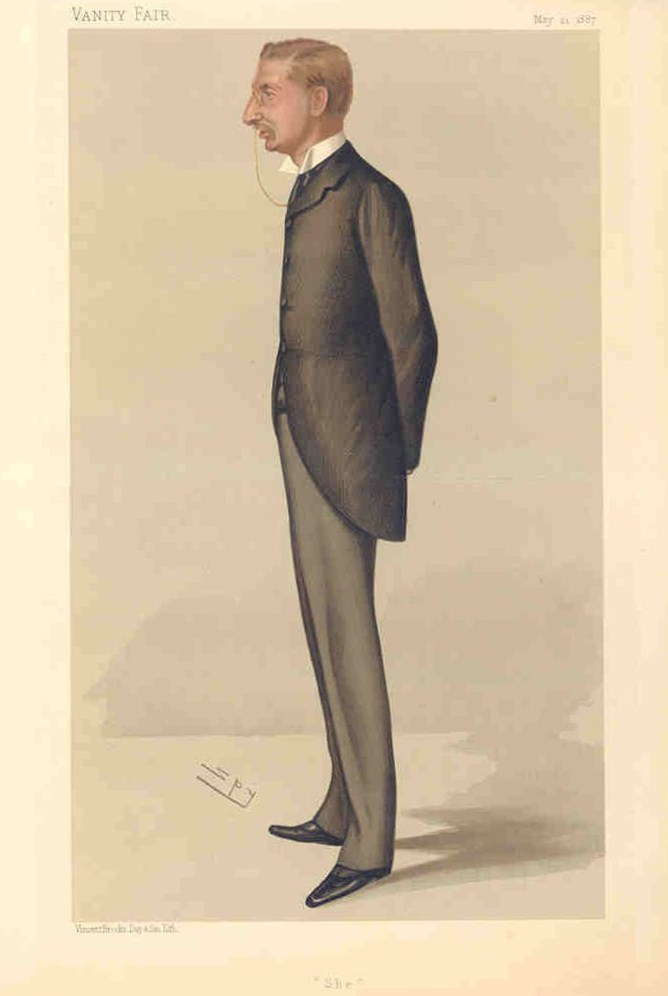
Vanity Fair, 1887

=== Influence ===
Psychoanalyst Carl Jung considered Ayesha, the female protagonist of She, to be a manifestation of the anima. Her epithet "She Who Must Be Obeyed" is used by British author John Mortimer in his Rumpole of the Bailey series as the lead character's private name for his wife, Hilda, before whom he trembles at home (despite the fact that he is a barrister with some skill in court). Haggard's Lost World genre influenced popular American and English pulp writers such as Edgar Rice Burroughs, Robert E. Howard, Talbot Mundy, Philip José Farmer, and Abraham Merritt. Allan Quatermain, the adventure hero of eighteen novels and short stories beginning with King Solomon's Mines (1885), was a template for the American character Indiana Jones. Quatermain has gained recent popularity thanks to being a main character in The League of Extraordinary Gentlemen comic book series and movie.

Graham Greene, in an essay about Haggard, stated, "Enchantment is just what this writer exercised; he fixed pictures in our minds that thirty years have been unable to wear away." Haggard was praised in 1965 by Roger Lancelyn Green, one of the Oxford Inklings, as a writer of a consistently high level of "literary skill and sheer imaginative power" and a co-originator with Robert Louis Stevenson of the Age of the Story Tellers.

=== On race ===
Professor Gilles Teulié argues that Haggard’s views on race were ambivalent, and different from the imperialist ones held by most of his contemporaries: “Haggard differs from all the race ideologists of his time as for him Blacks can be better warriors than Saxons, they can be compared to Berserkir, or worthy medieval European knights”. Marie-Claude Barbier calls Haggard a “reluctant imperialist”, and notes that, despite being an imperialist, he criticised the empire, showed admiration for the Zulu people and preserved their history.

Rider Haggard's works have been criticised for their depictions of non-Europeans. In his non-fiction book Decolonising the Mind, Kenyan author Ngũgĩ wa Thiong'o refers to Haggard, who he says was one of the canonical authors in primary and secondary school, as one of the "geniuses of racism." Author and academic Micere Mugo wrote in 1973 that reading the description of "an old African woman in Rider Haggard's King Solomon's Mines had for a long time made her feel mortal terror whenever she encountered old African women."

=== Influence on children's literature in the 19th century ===
During the 19th century, Haggard was one of many individuals who contributed to children's literature. Morton N. Cohen described King Solomon's Mines as a story that has "universal interest, for grown-ups as well as youngsters". Haggard himself wanted to write the book for boys, but it ultimately had an influence on children and adults around the world. Cohen explained, "King Solomon’s Mines was being read in the public schools [and] aloud in class-rooms".

=== General influence and legacy ===
The first chapter of Haggard's book People of the Mist is credited with inspiring the motto of the Royal Air Force (formerly the Royal Flying Corps), Per ardua ad astra.

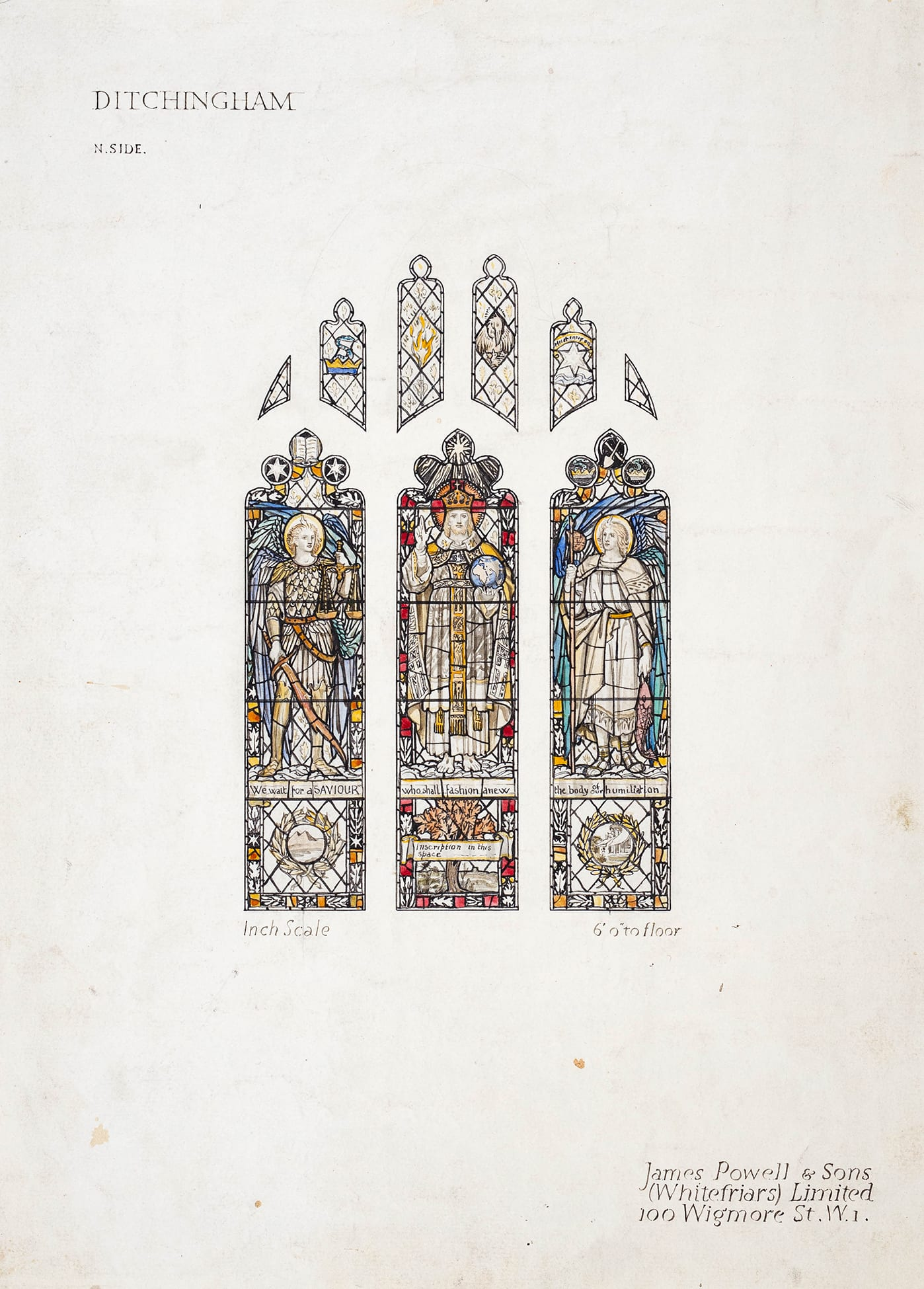
James Powell and Sons' presentation drawing for the Rider-Haggard window at Ditchingham Church, Norfolk (1925)

In 1925, his daughter Lilias commissioned a memorial window for Ditchingham Church, in his honour, from James Powell and Sons. The design features the Pyramids, his farm in Africa, and Bungay as seen from the Vineyard Hills near his home.

The Rider Haggard Society was founded in 1985. It publishes the Haggard Journal three times a year.

== Films based on Haggard's works ==
Haggard's writings have been turned into films many times including:

- King Solomon's Mines has been adapted for film at least seven times.
  - The first version, King Solomon's Mines, directed by Robert Stevenson, premiered in 1937.
  - The best known version premiered in 1950: King Solomon's Mines, directed by Compton Bennett and Andrew Marton, was followed in 1959 by a sequel, Watusi.
  - In 1979 a low-budget version directed by Alvin Rakoff, King Solomon's Treasure, combined both King Solomon's Mines and Allan Quatermain in one story.
  - In 1985, Cannon Pictures presented King Solomon's Mines...a tongue-in-cheek comedy inspired by the Indiana Jones franchise. It was shot back-to-back with Allan Quatermain and the Lost City of Gold, based on a second Haggard writing. Both movies drew considerable publicity, as they were released during the centennial of both novels.
  - Around the same time an Australian animated TV film came out as King Solomon's Mines.
  - In 2004 an American TV mini-series, King Solomon's Mines starred Patrick Swayze.
  - In 2008 a direct-to-video adaptation, Allan Quatermain and the Temple of Skulls, was released by Mark Atkins; it bore more resemblance to Indiana Jones than the novel.
- She has been adapted for film at least ten times, and was one of the earliest movies to be made:
  - In 1899, as La Colonne de feu (The Pillar of Fire), by Georges Méliès.
  - An American 1911 version starred Marguerite Snow.
  - A British-produced version appeared in 1916, and in 1917 Valeska Suratt appeared in a production for Fox which is lost.
  - In 1925 a silent film of She, starring Betty Blythe, was produced with the active participation of Rider Haggard, who wrote the intertitles. This film combines elements from all the books in the series.
  - The 1935 version, filmed a decade later, featured Helen Gahagan, Randolph Scott, Helen Mack, and Nigel Bruce. The lost city of Kôr is set in the Arctic, rather than Africa, and depicts the ancient civilisation in an Art Deco style. The music is by Max Steiner. The screenplay combines elements from all the books in the series, including Wisdom's Daughter. Producer Merian C. Cooper had wanted to film She in color, but switched to black-and-white after last-minute budget cuts. In 2006, Legend Films and Ray Harryhausen restored a colorized version for DVD release.
  - The 1965 film She was produced by Hammer Film Productions; it starred Ursula Andress as Ayesha and John Richardson as her reincarnated love, with Peter Cushing and Bernard Cribbins as other members of the expedition.
  - The 1984 adaptation of She took place in a post-apocalyptic setting, attempting to capitalize on the fame of Mad Max.
  - In 2001, another adaptation was released direct-to-video with Ian Duncan as Leo Vincey, Ophélie Winter as Ayesha and Marie Bäumer as Roxane.
- Dawn
  The film Dawn was released in 1917, starring Hubert Carter and Annie Esmond.
- Jess
  - In 1912 featuring Marguerite Snow, Florence La Badie and James Cruze.
  - In 1914 with Constance Crawley and Arthur Maude.
  - In 1917 as Heart and Soul, starring Theda Bara in the title role.
- Cleopatra
  The 1917 American film Cleopatra was based on Haggard's novel and other sources.
- Beatrice
  The book was adapted into a 1921 Italian silent drama film called The Stronger Passion, directed by Herbert Brenon and starring Marie Doro and Sandro Salvini.
- Swallow
  The novel was adapted into a 1922 South African film.
- Stella Fregelius
  The book was adapted into a 1921 British film, Stella.
- Moon of Israel
  This novel was the basis of a script by Ladislaus Vajda, for film-director Michael Curtiz in his 1924 Austrian epic known as Die Sklavenkönigin (Queen of the Slaves).
- Allan Quatermain is the lead character in the film League of Extraordinary Gentlemen (2003). Although the plot of this film is not found in any form in any of Haggard's work, the Quatermain in this film is explicitly meant to be Haggard's Quatermain.

== Namesakes ==
The locality of Rider, British Columbia, was named after him. Rider Haggard Lane in Kessingland, Suffolk, is the location of his former home.

== See also ==
- Louis Henri Boussenard (1847–1911), French author of adventure novels, dubbed the French Rider Haggard during his lifetime.
- Jules Verne (1828–1905), also wrote of fantastic worlds. Journey to the Center of the Earth and The Mysterious Island are novels that are similar in structure to the novels of Boussenard and Haggard.
- Pierre Benoit (1886–1962), French author whose novel L'Atlantide is similar to She.
- Emilio Salgari (1862–1911), Italian author of adventure novels and founder of the adventure genre in Italy.
- Alexandre Dumas, père (1802–1870), French author of historical novels of high adventure.
- Anthony Hope (1863–1933), English author of adventure novels such as The Prisoner of Zenda.
- P. C. Wren (1875–1941), British writer of adventure fiction. He is remembered best for Beau Geste, a much-filmed book of 1924 involving the French Foreign Legion in North Africa, and its sequels, Beau Sabreur and Beau Ideal.
- Mythopoeia
