= Vernon Haggard =

Royal Navy Admiral (1874–1960)

Admiral Sir Vernon Haggard KCB CMG
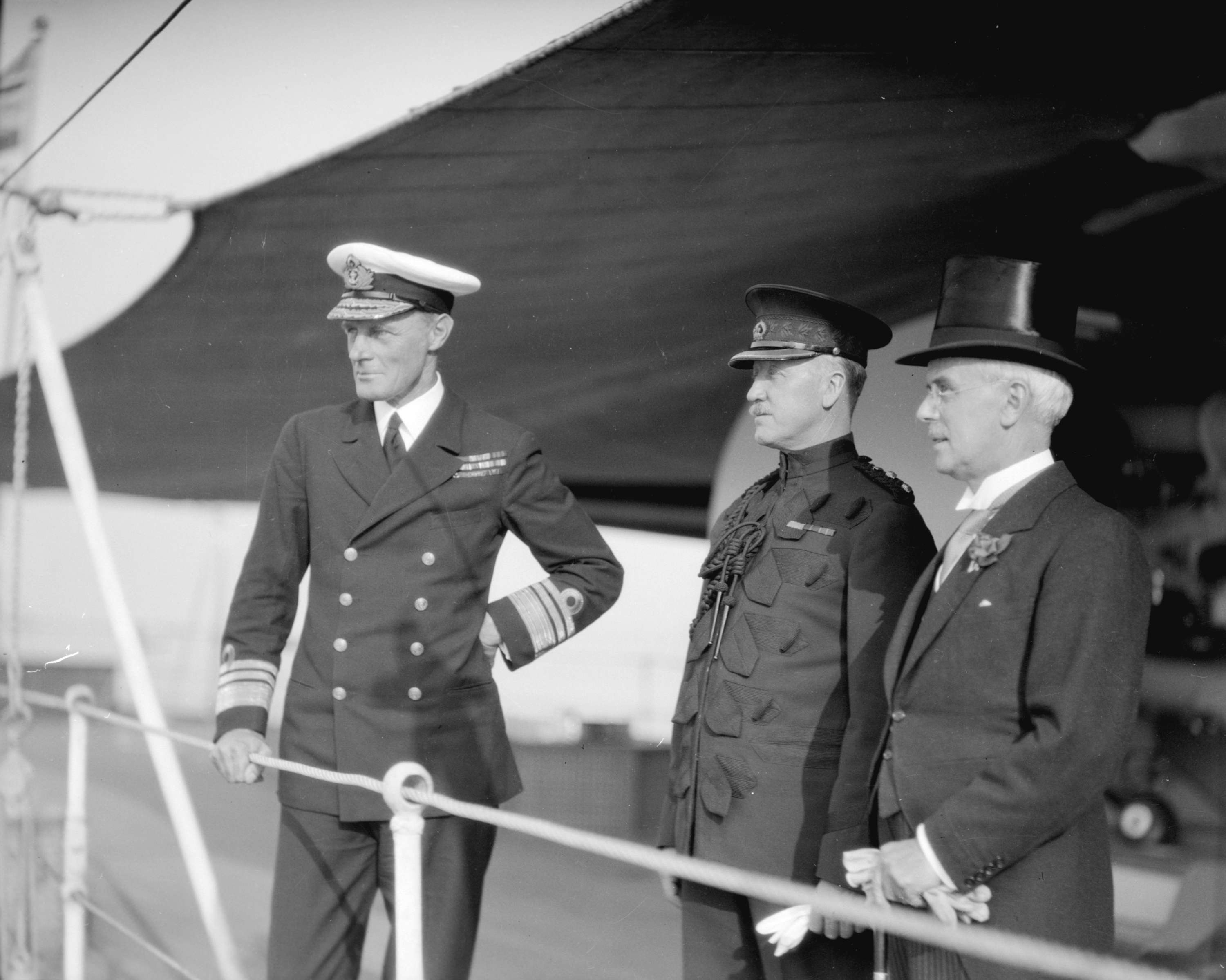
- Vice-Admiral Haggard (left) at Vancouver in 1930 with Mayor Malkin (right)
- Born: 28 October 1874; Bengal, India
- Died: 30 January 1960 (aged 85); Southend, Essex, England
- Military career
- Allegiance: United Kingdom
- Branch: Royal Navy
- Service years: 1888–1932
- Rank: Admiral
- Commands: HMS Boadicea; HMS Blenheim; HMS Good Hope; HMS Vulcan; HMS Hibernia; HMS Highflyer; HMS Ajax; America and West Indies Station
- Conflicts: Benin Expedition; World War I
- Awards: Knight Commander of the Order of the Bath; Companion of the Order of St Michael and St George; Croix de Guerre

Admiral Sir Vernon Harry Stuart Haggard, KCB, CMG (28 October 1874 – 30 January 1960) was a Royal Navy officer who went on to be Commander-in-Chief, America and West Indies Station. His career in the Royal Navy spanned forty-four years, from his entry as a youth in 1888 to his promotion to admiral in 1932.

== Background ==
A member of the Haggard family, he was the eldest child of Alfred Hinuber Haggard and his wife Alice Geraldine Schalch Haggard, having been born on 28 October 1874 in Bengal, India. His father was a Bengal Civil Service official. Vernon Haggard was the nephew of prolific author Sir Henry Rider Haggard, who achieved literary fame with his romances King Solomon's Mines and She: A History of Adventure. He was also the brother of diplomat Sir Godfrey Digby Napier Haggard, who served as British Consul General at New York City during World War II. In addition, he was the uncle of actor and writer Stephen Hubert Avenel Haggard, whose life was the subject of Christopher Hassall's The Timeless Quest.

== Naval career ==
Haggard joined the Royal Navy as a youth in 1888. On 14 May 1894, Acting Sub-Lieutenant Haggard was promoted to sub-lieutenant. He took part in the Benin Expedition to Nigeria in 1897. In late December 1905, the lieutenant was promoted to commander. He commanded HMS Boadicea in 1911. Commander Haggard received the Insignia of Commander of the Order of the Crown of Italy in 1912. He commanded HMS Blenheim that year, and both HMS Good Hope and HMS Vulcan in 1913. Captain Haggard was also put in command of the Seventh Submarine Flotilla in 1913. He served throughout World War I, commanding HMS Hibernia in 1915 and later the cadet training vessel HMS Highflyer.

In 1919, the captain received the Croix de Guerre from the French Republic, and became a Companion of the Order of St Michael and St George. After the war, he was in charge of the Naval Brigade on the Danube and then commanded the battleship HMS Ajax from 1920 to 1921. He was appointed Director of Training and Staff Duties at the Admiralty in 1921 and was promoted to rear admiral two years later. On 1 January 1925, Haggard became a Companion of the Order of the Bath and that year was appointed Chief of the Submarine Service. He was promoted from rear admiral to vice admiral and became Fourth Sea Lord and Chief of Supplies and Transport in 1928. He went on to be Commander-in-Chief of the America and West Indies Station in 1930. Haggard became a Knight Commander of the Order of the Bath on 3 June 1931. He was promoted from vice admiral to admiral the following year, effective 20 October 1932. Admiral Haggard retired from the Royal Navy that year.

== Family ==
In 1905, Haggard married Dorothy Booker Ellis, the daughter of Richard Adam Ellis and his wife Emma Eliza Booker Ellis, of Stock in Essex. They had three daughters: Avice Dorothy Haggard Lyster, Rosamond A Haggard Hunt, and Elizabeth G E Haggard Gibbon. The couple had one son, Hugh Alfred Vernon Haggard, DSO, DSC, also of the Royal Navy, who was the commanding officer of the submarine HMS Truant during World War II. Lieutenant Commander H A V Haggard's exploits in that submarine led to "Haggard of the Truant" being referred to as "Britain's Submarine Ace No. 1," with his vessel nicknamed "the adventure ship."

== Later life ==
Following his retirement in 1932, Haggard resided with his family at Little Court in Stock. He wrote the foreword to Hudson Strode's The Story of Bermuda, the first of the author's travel books. In addition, he was one of several military officers involved in the running of the Stock United Football Club. Haggard died on 30 January 1960 at 90 Crowstone Road in Southend, Essex. His funerary box was borne on a gun carriage, accompanied by an escort of fifty representatives of the Royal Navy. After three volleys were fired at his graveside, the Royal Marines played the Last Post and Reveille. He was interred at All Saints Churchyard in Stock. His estate went to probate on 21 March 1960. Lady Haggard died the following year, on 2 January 1961, at Chelmsford and Essex Hospital in Essex.

== Legacy ==
A collection of photographs of Vernon Haggard is held by the Imperial War Museum. In addition, the National Register of Archives and the Liddell Hart Centre for Military Archives at King's College London indicate that the Imperial War Museum serves as the repository for Haggard's five volumes of journals, covering the period from 1888 to 1932, and other papers, dated from 1885 to 1932. The National Portrait Gallery in London also has a portrait of Admiral Haggard that was obtained by photographer Walter Stoneman in 1930.

Military offices
Preceded by Wilmot Nicholson	Chief of the Submarine Service; 1925–1927	Succeeded by Henry Grace
Preceded by Sir William Fisher	Fourth Sea Lord; 1928–1930	Succeeded by Sir Lionel Preston
Preceded by Sir Cyril Fuller	Commander-in-Chief, America and West Indies Station; 1930–1932	Succeeded by Sir Reginald Plunkett
