= Stephen Haggard =

British actor, writer and poet (1911–1943)

- Stephen Haggard
- Born: 21 March 1911; Guatemala City, Guatemala
- Died: 25 February 1943 (aged 31); Egypt
- Resting place: Heliopolis War Cemetery
- Occupations: Actor, writer, poet, intelligence officer
- Years active: 1930s–1940s

Stephen Hubert Avenel Haggard (21 March 1911 – 25 February 1943) was a British actor, writer and poet.

== Early life ==
A member of the Haggard family, he was born on 21 March 1911 in Guatemala City, Guatemala, to Sir Godfrey Digby Napier Haggard, a British diplomat, and his wife Georgianna Ruel Haggard. He was the great-nephew of author H. Rider Haggard, and the brother of photographer and author Virginia Haggard, the companion of the painter Marc Chagall. Haggard was educated at Haileybury College, where he became close to the artist-schoolmaster Wilfrid Blunt.

== Training and career ==
After an initial foray into journalism, and determined to obtain some overseas experience, Haggard moved to Munich, where he studied for stage at the Munich State Theatres under Frau Magda Lena. He made his stage debut at the Schauspielhaus in October 1930 in the play Das kluge Kind directed by Max Reinhardt. He later appeared as Hamlet at the same theatre.

Upon Haggard's return to the United Kingdom in 1931, his career path was initially discouraging: he received only small parts in various London plays and worked in repertory in Worthing. He undertook further study at the Royal Academy of Dramatic Art and subsequently received good notices when he played Silvius in Shakespeare's As You Like It in London in 1933. He was noticed by the playwright Clemence Dane and made his first appearance in New York in 1934 as the poet Thomas Chatterton in her play Come of Age. Returning to Britain, he had successful roles in a number of plays, including Flowers of the Forest, a production of Mazo de la Roche's Whiteoaks, and he appeared as Konstantin in Chekhov's The Seagull, and was hailed as one of the most promising and handsome classical actors of the era.

Haggard married Morna Gillespie in September 1935, and they had three children, of whom one died young, and another is the director Piers Haggard. His granddaughter is actor Daisy Haggard.

In 1938, Haggard returned to New York to reprise his role as Finch in Whiteoaks, which he also directed. His novel Nya was published in the same year. He appeared as Mozart in the film Whom the Gods Love (1936). The film was not a success, in part because Haggard was considered to be inexperienced, and was unknown. He also appeared in Alfred Hitchcock's film Jamaica Inn (1939) and subsequently appeared as Lord Nelson in the Carol Reed film The Young Mr. Pitt (1942).

== Second World War ==
At the outbreak of the Second World War Haggard joined the British Army, serving as a captain in the Intelligence Corps. His wife and two sons went to the United States in 1940, where his father was consul-general in New York. Shortly after their departure, he wrote his sons a letter, which was published in the Atlantic Monthly later that year as "I'll Go to Bed at Noon: A Soldier's Letter to His Sons." Haggard was posted to the Middle East and worked for the Department of Political Warfare. There he met the author Olivia Manning and her husband, the broadcaster R. D. Smith. The latter recruited Haggard to play starring roles in his productions of Henry V and Hamlet on local radio in Jerusalem. Manning based the character Aidan Sheridan in her Fortunes of War novel sequence on Haggard.

== Death ==
While in the Middle East, Haggard fell in love with a beautiful Egyptian married woman whose husband worked in Palestine. Haggard was overworked and felt that the war had destroyed his acting career. He was on the edge of a nervous breakdown when after some months the woman decided to end the relationship. Haggard shot himself on a train between Cairo and Palestine on 25 February 1943 at the age of 31.

The manner of Haggard's death was hushed up and is not mentioned in the biography of Haggard written by Christopher Hassall and published in 1948. Haggard is buried in Heliopolis War Cemetery, in Cairo, Egypt.

== Filmography ==
Year	Title	Role	Notes
1936	Whom the Gods Love	Wolfgang Amadeus Mozart	(film debut)
1937	Knight Without Armor	Minor Role	Uncredited
1939	Jamaica Inn	Willie Penhale – Sir Humphrey's Gang	
1942	The Young Mr. Pitt	Lord Nelson	(final film role)

== Works ==
- Haggard, S. (1938). Nya. London: Faber and Faber Limited
- Haggard, S. (1944). I’ll Go to Bed at Noon: A Soldier’s Letter to His Sons. London, Faber and Faber
- Haggard, S. (1945). The Unpublished Poems of Stephen Haggard. Salamander Press
- Athene Seyler with Stephen Haggard (1946). The Craft of Comedy. New York : Theatre Arts
