= Godfrey Haggard =

British diplomat

Sir Godfrey Haggard

Personal details
- Born: Godfrey Digby Napier Haggard; 6 February 1884 Wanstead, Redbridge, Essex, England
- Died: 3 April 1969 (aged 85) Broomfield, Essex, England
- Spouse: Georgianna Ruel
- Children: Stephen Hubert Avenel Haggard; Paul Amyand Napier Haggard; Joan Marcia Geraldine Haggard; Virginia Edith Haggard
- Occupation: Diplomat
- Awards: Officer of the Order of the British Empire (1918); Commander of the Royal Victorian Order (1939); Knight Commander of the Order of St Michael and St George (1943)

Sir Godfrey Digby Napier Haggard KCMG CVO OBE (6 February 1884 – 3 April 1969) was a British diplomat. His career of service spanned forty-four years, culminating with his posting as Consul General at New York, and followed by his appointment as director of the American Forces Liaison Division of the Ministry of Information.

== Background ==
A member of the Haggard family, he was the third son of Alfred Hinuber Haggard, a Bengal Civil Service official, and his wife Alice Geraldine Schalch Haggard, having been born on 6 February 1884 in Wanstead, Redbridge, Essex, England. He was the nephew of prolific author Sir Henry Rider Haggard, who attained literary fame with his romances King Solomon's Mines and She: A History of Adventure. In addition, he was the brother of Admiral Sir Vernon Harry Stuart Haggard, who was Commander-in-Chief of the America and West Indies Station.

== Career ==
Haggard's career with the Consular Service began when he was still a youth, in 1901. He was appointed to the foreign office of the General Consular Service, and then as the British Vice Consul at Guatemala, Central America in 1908. He became Vice Consul at Paris in 1914, and at La Paz in 1915. In 1918, Haggard was appointed as the Chargé d'Affaires in Bolivia. By 1921, he was in Havana, as the Consul General for the Republic of Cuba, Republic of Haiti, and the Dominican Republic, serving in that capacity until 1924. Haggard was appointed Consul General in Brazil in 1924, residing at Rio de Janeiro. He later served elsewhere as Consul General: in Chicago between 1928 and 1932, in Paris between 1932 and 1938, and in New York City between 1938 and 1944. During his tenure in Chicago, he also served as Consul General for North Dakota, South Dakota, Iowa, Illinois, Indiana, Minnesota, Nebraska, Wisconsin, and Wyoming. His appointment as British Consul General at New York was announced on 9 Jun 1938; he succeeded Sir Gerald Campbell, who became High Commissioner to Canada. Later in 1938, Haggard was also appointed Consul General for the States of New York, Connecticut, and New Jersey (with the exception of the counties of Atlantic, Burlington, Camden, Cape May, Cumberland, Gloucester, Ocean, and Salem), as well as the islands of Saint Pierre and Miquelon.

After his retirement as the Consul General at New York in 1944, Haggard directed the American Forces Liaison Division of the Ministry of Information from 1944 to 1945. The diplomat was made an Officer of the Order of the British Empire in 1918, became a Companion of the Order of St Michael and St George in 1934, was made Commander of the Royal Victorian Order in 1939, and became a Knight Commander of the Order of St Michael and St George in 1943.

== Family ==
He married a native of Québec, Canada, Georgianna Ruel, the daughter of Hubert Ruel and his wife Marceline Goulet Ruel, on 3 May 1910 in Guatemala, Central America. They had four children; the eldest was actor and writer Stephen Hubert Avenel Haggard. Their eldest son's life was the subject of Christopher Hassall's The Timeless Quest. Their second child Paul died as an infant in Somersworth, New Hampshire, United States, where the Ruel family had immigrated in the late nineteenth century. Their third child Joan married diplomat Gerard Thomas Corley Smith, later Secretary General of the Charles Darwin Foundation. Daughter Virginia married twice and was the companion of artist Marc Chagall and, later, director Henri Storck.

== Later life ==
Haggard retired with his wife to Broomfield, Essex, near Chelmsford. His address in Broomfield at the time of his death on 3 April 1969 was Little Orchards Lane.
