= 2026 in stand-up comedy =

Years in stand-up comedy
- 2022 2023 2024 2025 2026

This is a timeline documenting events and facts about English-speaking stand-up comedy in the year 2026.

== January ==
- January 1: Trevor Noah's special The LOST South African Show (2023) on YouTube.
- January 7: Marcello Hernández's special American Boy on Netflix.
- January 11: Malik S's special Laughing Voodoo on YouTube.
- January 13: ISMO's special Hello on YouTube.
- January 15: Raanan Hershberg's special Morbidly Jewish on YouTube.
- January 16: Bob the Drag Queen's special This is Wild on Hulu.
- January 18: Ehsan Ahmad's special Too Soon on YouTube.
- January 20: Andy Franklin's special Andy Franklin Rules on YouTube.
- January 22: Janet McNamara's special Not Smart Enough on YouTube.
- January 23: Pete Holmes's special Silly Silly Fun Boy on 800 Pound Gorilla.
- January 27: Candice Guardino's special Italian Bred on Comedy Dynamics.
- January 28: Isabel Hagen's special at the Bitter End on Veeps.
- January 27: Mike Epps's special Delusional on Netflix.
- January 27: Kevin Nealon's special Loose in the Crotch on 800 Pound Gorilla.

== February ==
- February 3: Mo Gilligan's special In The Moment on Netflix.
- February 9: Urzila Carlson's special Just Jokes on YouTube.
- February 10: Katt Williams's special The Last Report on Netflix.
- February 17: Sommore's special Chandelier Fly on Netflix.
- February 21: Yedoye Travis' special Fatherless Behavior on YouTube.
- February 24: Taylor Tomlinson's special Prodigal Daughter on Netflix.
- February 26: Jackie Kashian's special Alter-Kashian on YouTube.
- February 27: Chris Fleming's special Live at The Palace on HBO Max.

== March ==
- March 3: Bruce Bruce's special I Ain't Playin' on Netflix.
- March 7: Gary Owen's special No Hard Feelings' on YouTube.
- March 8: Joey Avery's special Live in San Francisco on YouTube.
- March 10: Mario Adrion's special My Struggle' on YouTube.
- March 10: Derrick Stroup's special Nostalgic on Netflix.
- March 10: Matt Koff's special Cat Man on Veeps.
- March 17: Mark Normand's special None Too Pleased on Netflix.
- March 21: Dino Archie's special Beautiful Burden on HYPE+.
- March 23: Kountry Wayne's special Nostalgia on Prime Video.
- March 24: Jeff Ross's special Take a Banana For The Ride on Netflix.
- March 27: Jimmy O. Yang's special Finally Home in theaters.
- March 27: Julio Torres's special Color Theories on HBO Max.
- March 30: Joe Dombrowski's special Dad on Arrival on 800 Pound Gorilla.
- March 31: Aaron Chen's special Funny Garden' on Netflix.

== April ==
- April 1: Sarah Millican's special Late Bloomer on Netflix.
- April 4: Bill Bailey's special Thoughtifier on Chanel 4.
- April 7: Sheng Wang's special Purple on Netflix.
- April 7: David Cross's special The End Of The Beginning Of The End on YouTube.
- April 7: Ray O'Leary's special Laughter? I Hardly Know Her! on YouTube.
- April 9: Tyler Fischer's special Live in Portland on YouTube.
- April 13: Brad Williams's special Live On Short Street on YouTube.
- April 14: Trevor Noah's special Joy in the Trenches on Netflix.
- April 15: Brad Wenzel's special Desperate Times, on YouTube.
- April 17: Ramy Youssef's special In Love on HBO.
- April 18: Graham Kay's special Pete & Me on YouTube.
- April 24: Nikki Glaser's special Good Girl on Hulu.
- April 26: Jack Tucker's special Comedy Standup Hour on YouTube.
- April 30: Fahim Anwar's special Intrusive Thoughts on YouTube.

== May ==
- May 7: Jenny Tian's special Mother Supreme on Veeps.
- May 10: Anjelah Johnson-Reyes's special Ugly Baby on YouTube.
- May 15: Lisa Ann Walter's special It Was an Accident on Hulu.
- May 19: Wanda Sykes's special Legacy on Netflix.
- May 22: Josh Johnson's special Symphony on HBO.

== June ==
- June 2: Jen Kober's special Uber Famous on Comedy Dynamics.
- June 5: Hannah Berner's special None of My Business on Hulu.
- June 9: Tony Hinchcliffe's special Man Of The People on Netflix.
- June 9: Patton Oswalt's special Tea & Scotch on 800 Pound Gorilla.
- June 22: Ben Bankas's special R U Mad? on YouTube.
- June 23: Ryan Hamilton's special This Just Hit Me on Netflix.
- June 30: Louis C.K.'s special Ridiculous on Netflix.

== July ==
- July 2: Jeff Dunham's special 250th Red, White, And Blue Birthday Special on YouTube.
- July 7: Chris Porter's special Middle Rage on Comedy Dynamics.
- July 7: Jeff Arcuri's special Nice to Meet You on Netflix.
- July 10: Des Bishop's special Bridge and Tunnel on YouTube.
- July 24: Brian Bates's special Worried on YouTube.
- July 27: Emily Catalano's special The Introvert on YouTube.
- July 28: Mary Beth Barone's special Galaxy Brain on Netflix.

== August ==
- August 11: Rory Scovel's special Show Must Go On on Netflix.
- August 14: Whitmer Thomas's special Terminal Crew of Dudes on HBO Max.
- August 18: Kelsey Cook's special Happy Hour on Netflix.
- August 25: Craig Fay's special World's Deadliest Cat on YouTube.
- August 31: James Austin Johnson's special He'll Yeah on 800 Pound Gorilla.

== September ==
- September 1: Jared Freid's special The Family Plan on Netflix.
- September 8: Stavros Halkias's special Uncle Stav on Netflix.
- September 10: Jeremiah Watkins's special Crazy Pizza on YouTube.
- September 10: Ruby Karp's special I Don’t Trust Adults on Veeps.
- September 13: Are You Garbage special American Garbage on YouTube.
- September 14: Jim Florentine's special Jersey Trash on Prime Video.
- September 15: Jo Koy's special Blue In The Face on Netflix.
- September 15: Vanessa Gonzalez's special Mamona on Hulu.
- September 22: Nimesh Patel's special Buy the Dip on Netflix.
- September 29: Sam Morril's special Incorrect on Netflix.

== October ==
- October 5: Chris Hardwick's special The Middle Ages on 800 Pound Gorilla.
- October 6: Mojo Brookzz's special I Know You Lying on Netflix.
- October 7: Jamie Foxx's special Take Care of Yourself on Hulu.
- October 13: Michael Che's special Shot in Minnesota on Netflix.
- October 16: Kate Berlant's special ‘Parmesan’ on HBO.
- October 16: Heather McMahan's special By a Thread on Hulu.
- October 16: Jack Assadourian Jr.'s special Mexican Armenian on YouTube.
- October 19: Gareth Reynolds's special Why Aren't You Bigger? on 800 Pound Gorilla.
- October 20: Theo Von's special I'm Doing Fine on Netflix.
- October 23: Adam Conover's special Big Divorce Energy on YouTube.
- October 23: Alfred Robles's special El Cowboy on YouTube.
- October 25: Janine Harouni's special Man'oushe on YouTube.
- October 27: Zainab Johnson's special Toxically Optimistic on Netflix.
- October 28: Chloe Radcliffe's special Eyes Down Here on YouTube.
- October 28: Michelle Wolf's special For Linda on YouTube.

== November ==
- November 1: Pauly Shore's special Road Comic: Live From Portland on PS5 Live TV.
- November 3: Mike Tyson's special Return of the Mike on Netflix.
- November 10: Janelle James's special How Romantic on Netflix.

== See also ==
- List of stand-up comedians
- List of Netflix original stand-up comedy specials
