= 2025 in stand-up comedy =

Years in stand-up comedy
- 2021 2022 2023 2024 2025 2026

This is a timeline documenting events and facts about English-speaking stand-up comedy in the year 2025.

== January ==
- January 1: Doug Stanhope's special Discount Meat on YouTube.
- January 1: Melissa Villaseñor's special Welp...What Now? on YouTube.
- January 7: Gabriel Iglesias's special Legend of Fluffy on Netflix.
- January 10: Alok Vaid-Menon’s special Biology! on YouTube
- January 10: Bill Maher's special Is Anyone Else Seeing This? on HBO.
- January 14: Ari Shaffir's special America's Sweetheart on Netflix.
- January 17: Roy Wood Jr.'s special Lonely Flowers on Hulu.
- January 24: Trey Kennedy's special Grow Up, on Hulu.
- January 28: Liza Treyger's special Night Owl on Netflix.
- January 28: Tom Green's special I Got A Mule! on Prime Video.
- January 31: Ginger Billy's special Double Wide Dreamer on YouTube.

== February ==
- February 2: Marjolein Robertson's special Marj on YouTube.
- February 5: Rhys James's special Spilt Milk on YouTube.
- February 5: Max Amini's special Randomly Selected on YouTube.
- February 11: Felipe Esparza's special Raging Fool on Netflix.
- February 11: Kelsey Cook's special Mark Your Territory on Hulu.
- February 12: Marcus D. Wiley's special Marriage Is Major Surgery on YouTube.
- February 12: Craig Ferguson's special I'm So Happy on YouTube.
- February 13: Urzila Carlson's special Just No! on YouTube.
- February 18: Rosebud Baker's special The Mother Lode on Netflix.
- February 18: George Lopez's special Muy Católico (Very Catholic) on Prime Video.
- February 19: John Crist's special Emotional Support on YouTube.
- February 20: Big Jay Oakerson's special Them on YouTube.
- February 21: Chris Distefano's special It's Just Unfortunate, on Hulu.
- February 25: Are You Garbage's special Route 66 Tour on YouTube.

== March ==
- March 2: Mike Rice's special Nasty Character on YouTube.
- March 4: Andrew Schulz's special Life on Netflix.
- March 9: Ali Siddiq's special My Two Sons on Moment.
- March 11: Iliza Shlesinger's special A Different Animal on Prime Video.
- March 11: Scott Kelley's special Word of Mouth on Prime Video.
- March 13: Trae Crowder's special Trash Daddy on YouTube.
- March 14: Bill Burr's special Drop Dead Years on Hulu.
- March 18: Bert Kreischer's special Lucky on Netflix.
- March 25: Chelsea Handler's special The Feeling on Netflix.
- March 26: Ali Siddiq's special Rugged on Moment.

== April ==
- April 7: Arnez J's special Not Gonna Stop on YouTube.
- April 15: Tim Dillon's special I'm Your Mother on Netflix.
- April 25: Jessica Kirson’s special I'm the Man on Hulu.
- April 26: Brett Goldstein’s special The Second Best Night of Your Life on HBO.

== May ==
- May 4: Conan O'Brien: The Kennedy Center Mark Twain Prize for American Humor on Netflix.
- May 6: David Spade's special Dandelion on Prime Video.
- May 11: Cameron Esposito's special 4 Pills on Dropout.
- May 16: Matteo Lane's special The Al Dente on Hulu.
- May 20: Sarah Silverman's special PostMortem on Netflix.
- May 20: Comedian CP's special Sunday After Six on Veeps.
- May 21: Brent Weinbach's special Popular Culture on YouTube.
- May 24: Jerrod Carmichael's special Don't Be Gay on HBO.
- May 26: Mike Birbiglia's special The Good Life on Netflix.

== June ==
- June 1: Yannis Pappas's special Property Owner on YouTube.
- June 6: Joe List's special Small Ball on YouTube.
- June 6: Ken Flores's special LOL Live with Ken Flores on Hulu.
- June 13: Jim Norton's special Unconceivable on YouTube.
- June 13: Atsuko Okatsuka's special Father on Hulu.
- June 17: Justin Willman's special Magic Lover on Netflix.
- June 24: Steph Tolev's special Filth Queen on Netflix.
- June 27: Drew Lynch's special The Stuttering Comedian on YouTube.
- June 27: Mike Vecchione's special Low Income White on YouTube.

== July ==
- July 8: Nate Jackson's special Super Funny on Netflix.
- July 11: Chinedu Unaka's special LOL Live with Chinedu Unaka on Hulu.
- July 15: Gus Tate's special Two Wrongs on YouTube.
- July 17: Eddie Pepitone's special The Collapse on Veeps.
- July 18: Vir Das's special Fool Volume on Netflix.
- July 18: Zarna Garg's special Practical People Win on Hulu.
- July 21: Joe DeRosa's special I Never Promised You A Rose Garden on YouTube.
- July 29: Dusty Slay's special Wet Heat on Netflix.

== August ==
- August 1: Marc Maron's special Panicked on HBO.
- August 1: Peter Serafinowicz's special Brian Butterfield: Call of Now on Prime Video.
- August 8: Ralph Barbosa's special Planet Bosa on Hulu.
- August 12: Jim Jefferies's special Two Limb Policy on Netflix.
- August 12: Josh Wolf's special The Campfire Special on YouTube.
- August 19: Finlay Christie's special Aura Farmer on YouTube.

== September ==
- September 5: Lil Rel Howery's special Rel Talk on Tubi.
- September 9: Jordan Jensen's special Take Me With You on Netflix.
- September 11: David Nihill's special Shelf Help on YouTube.
- September 12: Andrew Santino's special White Noise on Hulu.
- September 12: Larry The Cable Guy's special It's a Gift on Prime Video.
- September 19: Gianmarco Soresi's special Thief of Joy on YouTube.
- September 19: Caleb Hearon's special Model Comedian on HBO.
- September 23: Ian Edwards's special Untitled on YouTube.
- September 23: Cristela Alonzo's special Upper Classy on Netflix.
- September 23: Samantha Hale's special Horror Nerd on Prime Video.
- September 30: Earthquake's special Joke Telling Business on Netflix.

== October ==
- October 7: Matt McCusker's special A Humble Offering on Netflix.
- October 7: Phoebe Robinson's special I Don’t Want to Work Anymore on YouTube.
- October 10: Frankie Quiñones's special Damn That's Crazy on Hulu.
- October 15: Bryan Callen's special False Gods on YouTube.
- October 21: Michelle Wolf's special The Well on Netflix.
- October 24: Leslie Jones's special Life Part 2 on Peacock.
- October 24: Ryan Sickler's special Live & Alive on YouTube.
- October 28: Mo Amer's special Wild World on Netflix.

== November ==
- November 2: Luis J. Gomez's special You're Making This Worse on YouTube.
- November 4: Leanne Morgan's special Unspeakable Things on Netflix.
- November 7: Jay Jurden's special Yes Ma'am on Hulu.
- November 8: Jiaoying Summers's special What Specie Are You? on Hulu.
- November 9: Zoltan Kaszas's special London Fog on YouTube.
- November 9: Bo Johnson's special Two Sailboats on YouTube.
- November 20: Patton Oswalt's special Black Coffee and Ice Water on Audible.
- November 18: Gerry Dee's special Funny You Should Say That on Netflix.
- November 19: Demi Adejuyigbe's special Demi Adejuyigbe Is Going To Do 1 (One) Backflip on Dropout.
- November 21: Sebastian Maniscalco's special It Ain't Right on Hulu.
- November 21: Kathleen Madigan's special The Family Thread on Prime Video.
- November 24: Kevin Hart's special Acting My Age on Netflix.

== December ==
- December 2: Matt Rife's special Unwrapped — A Christmas Crowd Work Special on Netflix.
- December 12: Sarah Sherman’s special Sarah Squirm: Live + In the Flesh on HBO.
- December 14: Robby Hoffman's special Wake Up on Netflix.
- December 14: Alfie Brown's special The Last Cancelled Comedian on YouTube.
- December 15: Aparna Nancherla's special Hopeful Potato on Dropout.
- December 19: Dave Chappelle's special The Unstoppable on Netflix.
- December 19: Kumail Nanjiani's special Night Thoughts? on Hulu.
- December 20: Roy Wood Jr.'s special Very Very Very Merry Holiday Special on CNN.
- December 21: Ali Siddiq's special Mondays on Youtube.
- December 24: Tom Segura's special Teacher on Netflix.
- December 28: David Nihill's special Shelf Help on Youtube.
- December 30: Ricky Gervais's special Mortality on Netflix.

== See also ==
- List of stand-up comedians
- List of Netflix original stand-up comedy specials
