= 2024 in stand-up comedy =

Years in stand-up comedy
- 2019 2020 2021 2022 2023 2024 2025

This is a timeline documenting events and facts about English-speaking stand-up comedy in the year 2024.

== January ==
- January 9: Dudesy's special George Carlin: I'm Glad I'm Dead on YouTube.
- January 9: Russell Peters's special Irresponsible Ensemble on CTV.
- January 9: Pete Davidson's special Turbo Fonzarelli on Netflix.
- January 12: Lou Moon's album Lou on Stand Up! Records.
- January 16: Dusty Slay's special Workin' Man on Netflix.
- January 16: Des Bishop's special Of All People on YouTube.
- January 22: Ryan Goodcase's special Maybe They're Dead on YouTube.
- January 23: Kevin James's special Irregardless on Prime Video.
- January 23: Jacqueline Novak's special Get on Your Knees on Netflix.
- January 30: Laurie Kilmartin’s special Cis Woke Grief Sl*t on Prime Video.
- January 30: Jack Whitehall's special Settle Down on Netflix.

== February ==
- February 1: Angela Barnes's special Hot Mess on NextUp Comedy.
- February 3: Jeff Dunham's special I’m with Cupid on Comedy Central.
- February 6: Kim McVicar's special Female Comedian on Prime Video.
- February 13: Taylor Tomlinson's special Have It All on Netflix.
- February 20: Mike Epps's special Ready to Sell Out on Netflix.
- February 20: Randy Feltface's special Feltopia on YouTube.
- February 20: Mary Basmadjian's special Funny Armenian Girl on Prime Video.
- February 23: Rory Scovel's special Religion, Sex, and a Few Things In Between on Max.
- February 23: Jenny Slate's special Seasoned Professional on Prime Video.
- February 23: H. Foley's (Are You Garbage Podcast) special Half Hour on YouTube.
- February 25: Daniel Howell's special We're All Doomed! on YouTube.
- February 27: Chappelle's Home Team – Donnell Rawlings's special A New Day on Netflix.
- February 28: Fahim Anwar's special House Money on YouTube.
- February 29: David Cross' special Worst Daddy in the World on YouTube.
- February 29: Anjelah Johnson-Reyes's special Technically Not Stalking on YouTube.

== March ==
- March 1: Eleanor Kerrigan's special No Country for Old Women on YouTube.
- March 1: Dan Soder's special On The Road on YouTube.
- March 4: Kyle Kinane's special Dirt Nap on 800 Pound Gorilla.
- March 5: Hannah Gadsby's special Gender Agenda on Netflix.
- March 10: Akaash Singh's special GASLIT on YouTube.
- March 12: Cara Connors's special Straight for Pay on Prime Video.
- March 12: Steve Treviño's special Simple Man on Netflix.
- March 15: Brent Pella's special Conscious Bro on YouTube.
- March 18: Preacher Lawson's special My Name Is Preacher on YouTube.
- March 19: Kevin Ryan's (Are You Garbage Podcast) special Live in Philly on YouTube
- March 19: Brian Simpson's special Live from the Mothership on Netflix.
- March 22: Mary Beth Barone's special Thought Provoking on YouTube.
- March 22: Mike Recine's special I'm Normal on YouTube.
- March 22: Dan Rath's special I'm Not Doing Well Folks on YouTube.
- March 22: Gabriel Rutledge's special Nectarine on YouTube.
- March 23: Mike Vecchione's special Worst Kind of Thoughtful on YouTube.
- March 23: Ramy Youssef's special More Feelings on Max.
- March 26: Mike Birbiglia's special Good One: A Show About Jokes on Peacock.
- March 26: Nish Kumar's special Your Power, Your Control on Prime Video.
- March 26: Tig Notaro's special Hello Again on Prime Video.
- March 26: Dave Attell's special Hot Cross Buns on Netflix.

== April ==
- April 2: Sierra Katow’s special Funt on Prime Video.
- April 2: Demetri Martin's special Demetri Deconstructed on Netflix.
- April 4: Natasha Vaynblat's special We're All Dads Here on YouTube.
- April 6: Alex Edelman's special Just for Us on HBO.
- April 6: Katie Hughes's special Double Feature on YouTube.
- April 9: Neal Brennan's special Crazy Good on Netflix.
- April 12: Ian Abramson's special The Heist on YouTube.
- April 16: Jimmy Carr's special Natural Born Killer on Netflix.
- April 21: Ian Fidance's special Wild, Happy & Free on YouTube.
- April 22: Fern Brady's special Autistic Bikini Queen on Netflix.
- April 23: Kate Willett's special Loopholes on Prime Video.
- April 26: Christina Catherine Martinez's special How to Bake a Cake in the Digital Age on YouTube.

== May ==
- May 3: Colin Quinn's special Our Time Is Up on YouTube.
- May 4: Katt Williams's special Woke Foke on Netflix.
- May 5: The Roast of Tom Brady on Netflix.
- May 11: Mark Twain Prize Award: Kevin Hart on Netflix.
- May 11: Nikki Glaser's special Someday You'll Die on Max.
- May 12: Ali Siddiq's special The Domino Effect part 3: First Day of School on YouTube.
- May 15: Conner O'Malley's special Stand Up Solutions on YouTube.
- May 18: Geoff Tice's special Jokes with a G on YouTube.
- May 21: Rachel Feinstein's special Big Guy on Netflix.
- May 26: Matt Green's special That Guy on YouTube.
- May 28: Gary Vider's special It Could Be Worse on YouTube.
- May 29: Dale Jones's special DRUNK TANK on YouTube.
- May 30: Dan Licata's special For The Boys on YouTube.
- May 31: Sal Vulcano's special Terrified on YouTube.

== June ==
- June 1: Matteo Lane's special The Advice Special part 3 on YouTube.
- June 4: Jo Koy's special Live from Brooklyn on Netflix.
- June 4: Marlon Wayans's special Good Grief on Prime Video.
- June 11: Keith Robinson's special Different Strokes on Netflix.
- June 11: Jeff Cerulli's special Live at the Bomb Shelter on Prime Video.
- June 13: Hannah Einbinder's special Everything Must Go on Max.
- June 16: Zoltan Kaszas's special Honorary Jones on YouTube.
- June 16: Adam Ray's special Like And Subscribe on YouTube.
- June 16: Ali Siddiq's special The Domino Effect part 4: Pins & Needles on YouTube.
- June 21: Raanan Hershberg's special Brave on YouTube.
- June 24: Rachel Scanlon's special Gay Fantasy on Prime Video.
- June 24: Tyler Fischer's special The Election Special on YouTube.

== July ==
- July 9: Sam Morril's special You’ve Changed on Prime Video.
- July 9: Hannah Berner's special We Ride at Dawn on Netflix.
- July 16: Chad Daniels's special Empty Nester on Netflix.
- July 18: Nick Swardson's special Make Joke from Face on YouTube.
- July 20: Stewart Lee's special Basic Lee: Live at The Lowry on Sky.

== August ==
- August 3: Joe Rogan's special Burn the Boats on Netflix.
- August 8: Brendan Sagalow's special Thin Lips on YouTube.
- August 9: Brittany Schmitt's special Horny on YouTube.
- August 13: Matt Rife's special Lucid – A Crowd Work Special on Netflix.
- August 20: Langston Kerman's special Bad Poetry on Netflix.
- August 27: Adam Sandler's special Love You on Netflix.
- August 27: Greg Fitzsimmons's special You Know Me on YouTube.
- August 30: Seaton Smith's special Smart and Ignorant on YouTube.

== September ==
- September 3: Phil Wang's special Wang in There, Baby! on Netflix.
- September 5: Sarah Tollemache's special B*tth*le Money on YouTube.
- September 10: Ahir Shah's special Ends on Netflix.
- September 12: Colin Jost & Michael Che's special New York After Dark on Peacock.
- September 15: Mike Cannon's special Traumatized Animal on YouTube.
- September 17: Deon Cole's special Ok, Mister on Netflix.
- September 20: Steve Hofstetter's album Me, Myself, + ID on Spotify.
- September 22: Jay Pharoah's special Jared on YouTube.
- September 24: Ellen DeGeneres's special For Your Approval on Netflix.
- September 29: Horatio Gould's special Sweet Prince on YouTube.

== October ==
- October 1: Craig Ferguson's I'm So Happy on Prime Video
- October 3: Josh Wolf's special Four Stories on YouTube.
- October 8: Ali Wong's special Single Lady on Netflix.
- October 9: Ryan Long's special Problem Solved on YouTube.
- October 9: Paul Virzi's special Reasonable Man on YouTube.
- October 11: Heather McMahan's special Breadwinner on Hulu.
- October 15: Rachel Bloom's special Death, Let Me Do My Special on Netflix.
- October 19: JR De Guzman's special I'm Your Son, Papa on YouTube.
- October 20: Ben Bankas's special Elect This on YouTube.
- October 22: Hasan Minhaj's special Off With His Head on Netflix.
- October 26: Seth Meyers's special Dad Man Walking on Max.
- October 29: Tom Papa's special Home Free on Netflix.

== November ==
- November 8: Adam Rowe's special What's Wrong With Me? on YouTube.
- November 12: Adrienne Iapalucci's special The Dark Queen on Netflix.
- November 14: Jeff Dye's special Last Cowboy in LA on YouTube.
- November 19: Adam Ray's special Adam Ray Is Dr. Phil Unleashed on Netflix.
- November 19: Jeff Dunham's special Scrooged-Up Holiday Special on Prime Video.
- November 20: Tom Lehrer's single "(I’m Spending) Hanukkah in Santa Monica"/"A Christmas Carol" on Stand Up! Records.
- November 22: Jim Gaffigan's special The Skinny on Hulu.
- November 23: James Acaster's special Hecklers Welcome on Max.
- November 23: James Donald Forbes McCaan's special Christmas Special on YouTube.
- November 26: Anthony Jeselnik's special Bones and All on Netflix.
- November 27: Tumua's special Strictly Aloha on YouTube.
- November 28: Dane Cook's special Above It All on YouTube.
- November 29: Kaleb Cooper's special The World According to Kaleb: On Tour on Prime Video.

== December ==
- December 3: Fortune Feimster's special Crushing It on Netflix.
- December 5: Russell Peters's special Act Your Age Live in Abu Dhabi on Patreon.
- December 10: Jamie Foxx's special What Had Happened Was... on Netflix.
- December 11: Matthew Broussard's special Hyperbolic on YouTube.
- December 13: Joe Mande's special Chill on Hulu.
- December 14: Michael McIntyre's special 25th Year Stand-Up Special on BBC.
- December 17: Ronny Chieng's special Love To Hate It on Netflix.
- December 18: Josh Blue's special Freak Accident on YouTube.
- December 19: Rose Matafeo's special On and On and On on Max.
- December 20: Ilana Glazer's special Human Magic on Hulu.
- December 24: Nate Bargatze's special Your Friend, Nate Bargatze on Netflix.
- December 27: Torching 2024: A Roast Of the Year on Netflix.
- December 31: Michelle Buteau's special A Buteau-ful Mind at Radio City Music Hall on Netflix.

== See also ==
- List of stand-up comedians
- List of Netflix original stand-up comedy specials
