= Cheaper Than Therapy =

Comedy club in San Francisco, California

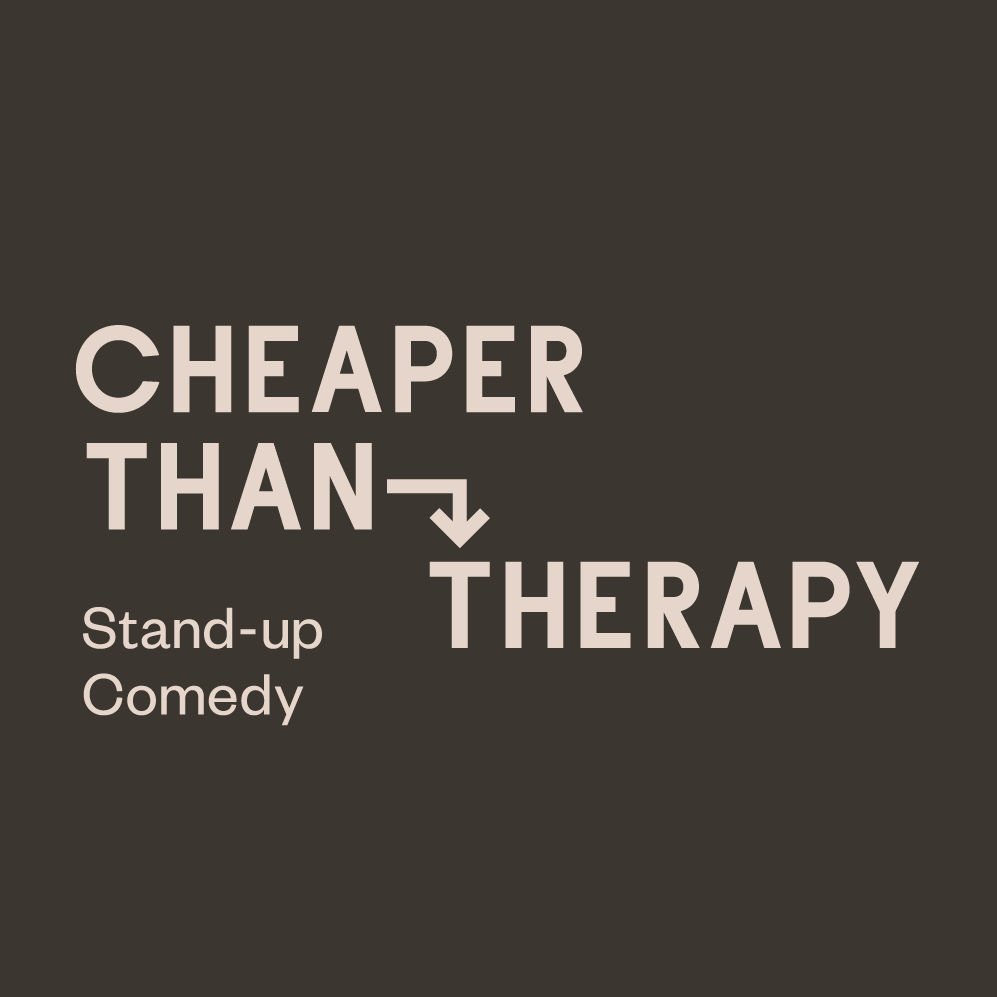
- Cheaper Than Therapy logo
- Interactive map of Cheaper Than Therapy
- Address: 533 Sutter St
- Location: San Francisco, California
- Coordinates: 37.789028°N 122.409144°W
- Seating type: General admission
- Capacity: 99
- Type: Comedy club
- Public transit: Powell Street, BART and Muni

Construction
- Opened: 2013

Website
- cttcomedy.com

Cheaper Than Therapy is a comedy club in San Francisco, CA. Founded in 2013 by comedians Scott Simpson, Eloisa Bravo, and Jon Allen, Cheaper Than Therapy presents seven shows per week at the Shelton Theater in the Union Square area.

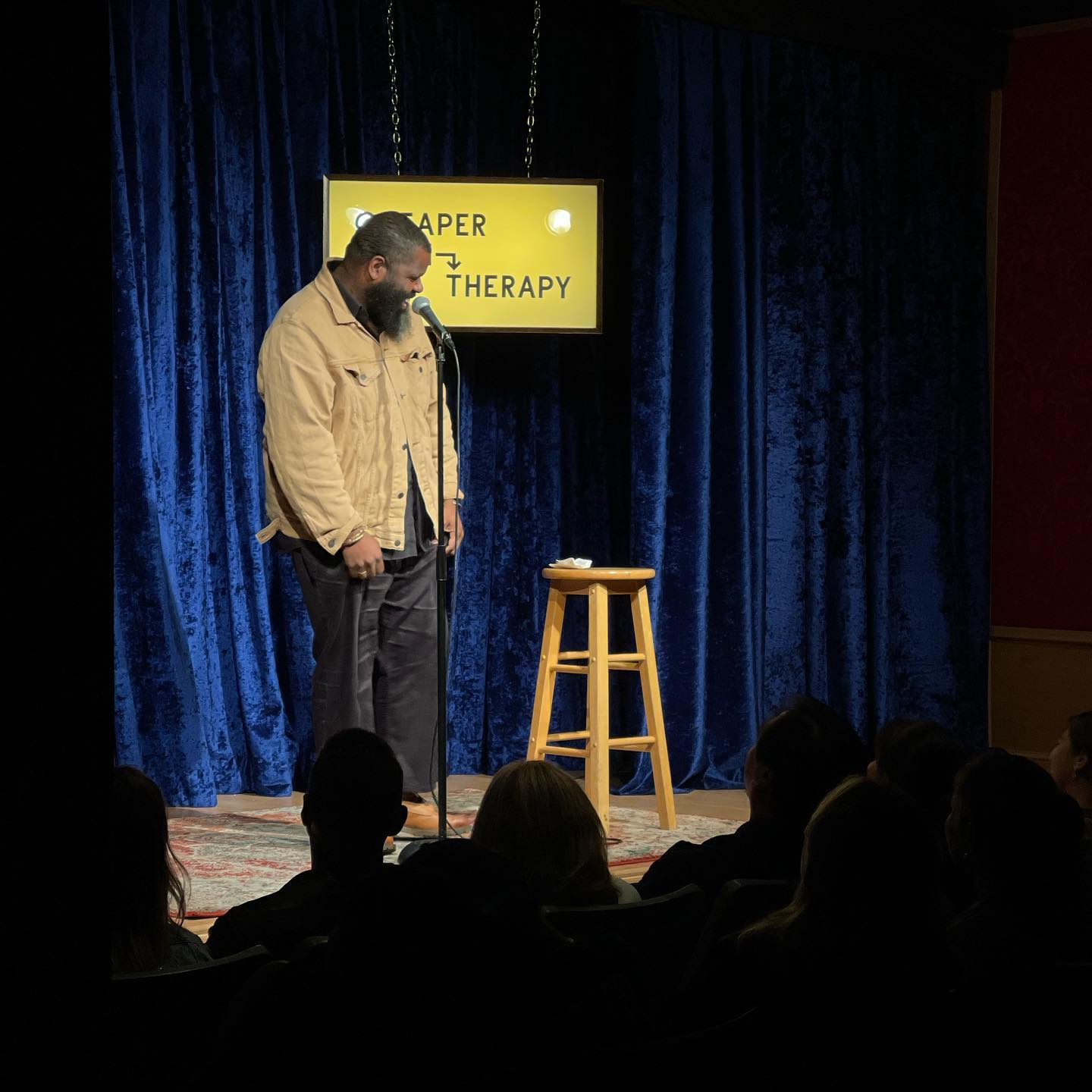
Kaseem Bentley on stage at stand-up comedy club Cheaper Than Therapy

== History ==
Cheaper Than Therapy began as a comedy night at The Purple Onion in 2013. The show relocated to Shelton Theater in late 2013, where it remains. Co-founder Jon Allen explained the name's origin in the San Francisco Chronicle: “The audience always thought our name was a play on it being cheaper than therapy for them, but no, it was cheaper for me and other comedians.” Due to audience demand, the show expanded from its initial weekend performances to seven shows per week. Operations ceased temporarily during the COVID-19 pandemic. Following the pandemic, comedy performances rebounded, with the venue selling 29,000 tickets in 2023. Allen and Simpson assumed management of Shelton Theater in 2021 following founder Matt Shelton's retirement.

== Format and operations ==
Cheaper Than Therapy operates at Shelton Theater, located at 533 Sutter Street in San Francisco's Union Square district. The club presents shows Wednesday through Sunday, with two performances on Fridays and Saturdays. The venue admits patrons 18 and older with no drink minimum required.

The club uses an unannounced lineup format, with tickets sold at a flat rate regardless of performers. Shows conclude before public transportation services end, allowing audience access to BART and Munisystems. Comedians interact with audiences following performances. Shelton Theater is located at 533 Sutter St, San Francisco, CA 94102.

== Notable performers ==
The club featured comedians including Alex Edelman, Emma Willmann, The Lucas Brothers, Laurie Kilmartin, Mekki Leeper, Michael Che, Sam Tallent, and Tom Rhodes.

== Reception ==
California.com named Cheaper Than Therapy one of California's best comedy clubs. Entrepreneur magazine recognized Cheaper Than Therapy as one of America's favorite independent businesses and ranked it third among America's 15 favorite local entertainment experiences.
