= Your Mom's House =

Comedy podcast

- Genre: Comedy
- Country of origin: United States
- Language: English

Creative team
- Created by: Tom Segura; Christina Pazsitzky

Cast and voices
- Hosted by: Tom Segura; Christina Pazsitzky

Production
- Length: Approx. 1–3 hours

Publication
- Original release: October 20, 2010

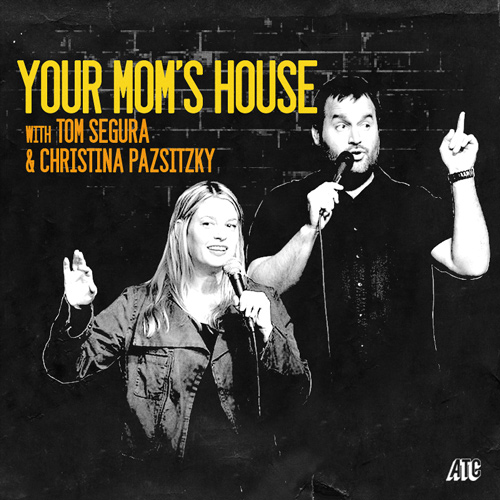
Your Mom's House iTunes artwork

Your Mom's House is a comedy podcast hosted by comedians Tom Segura and Christina Pazsitzky. The podcast was started in 2010 and covers a wide range of topics such as ongoing events, comedy, and the daily life of the two co-hosts—interspersed with toilet humor, running jokes, and commentary on unusual or shocking internet videos. This includes creating YMH Celebrities known as the "cool guy club" by repeatedly playing videos of nicknamed, socially-untypical members of the public, in "a modern variation of the regular callers into The Howard Stern Show." The comedians typically stay away from political discussions, and the majority of their guests are fellow comedians. Additionally YMH Studios produces a number of podcasts on their network, including "2 Bears 1 Cave," "Dr. Drew After Dark," and "The Danny Brown Show." Starting in 2020, YMH studios began producing live pay-per-view events that can be rented on their website.

== History ==
Segura and Pazsitzky originally started the podcast through the Deathsquad Network, and produced by Brian Redban. Segura and Pazsitzky mentioned in a 2014 Vice article that Joe Rogan had encouraged them to start a podcast. After 40 episodes they started producing the show themselves with the help of producer Nadav Itzkowitz.

In 2012, Your Mom's House was chosen as a finalist in the Best Comedy category at the first annual Stitcher Awards, along with Smodcast, The Adam Carolla Show, The Joe Rogan Experience, The Nerdist, and WTF with Marc Maron.

YMH Studios has also produced a number of other podcasts, including 2 Bears 1 Cave (hosted by Segura and Bert Kreischer), Dr. Drew After Dark (hosted by Drew Pinsky), Where My Moms At (hosted by Christina Pazsitzky), The Danny Brown Show (hosted by Danny Brown), Tom Segura en Español (a Spanish podcast hosted by Segura), and Tom Talks (a solo, interview driven podcast with Segura). The HoneyDew (hosted by Ryan Sickler) was previously produced at YMH Studios before separating in summer 2020. Beginning in fall of 2020 the studio began the new podcast Roach Motel (hosted by Josh Potter), however this show was quickly re-named The Josh Potter Show after only seven episodes due to a copyright dispute. In January 2023, Segura and Pazsitzky announced a new show on YMH Studios' network hosted by Rob Iler and Jamie-Lynn Sigler of The Sopranos and the Pajama Pants podcast. The newest addition is First Date hosted by Lauren Compton.

During the COVID-19 pandemic, YMH Studios began producing live, pay-per-view shows beginning with Your Mom's House Live & Uncensored on August 14, 2020. As of 2022 the studio has produced three live shows for 2 Bears 1 Cave (including a Big Game event with NFL Hall of Famer Warren Sapp), and nine for Your Mom's House. In late 2021, YMH Studios moved from Los Angeles, to Austin, Texas.

== Guests ==
Episodes often feature prominent guests from the world of entertainment and pop culture, notably fellow stand-up comedians such as Bert Kreischer, Joe Rogan, Andrew Santino, Tom Papa, Josh Wolf, Chad Daniels, Matteo Lane, Stavros Halkias, Robert Kelly, Louis CK, Bobby Lee, Andrew Schulz, Ari Shaffir and Adam Friedland. Johnny Pemberton had made multiple appearances and regularly contributes graphics to the show.

The show has branched out to non-comedian guests including musical artists like Big Daddy Kane, Brendon Urie, and Too Short; actors including Rob Iler, Jamie-Lynn Sigler, Alyssa Milano, and Elizabeth Lail; celebrity personalities like Cesar Millan and Rhett & Link, and adult actresses Alexis Fawx and Kate Kennedy. In late 2022, director Kevin Smith appeared as a guest, where he defended posting photos of his reaction to Black Panther: Wakanda Forever.

2 Bears 1 Cave has had guest hosts due to either Kreischer touring, or when Segura was injured in a basketball dunking challenge. Guest hosts include YMH team members Christina P and Dr. Drew, comedians Ryan Sickler, Tim Dillon, Whitney Cummings, Bobby Lee, and LeeAnn Kreischer. In November 2022 Quentin Tarantino guest hosted with Segura, where he criticized the Marvel Cinematic Universe for overshadowing movie stars.

== Fandom ==
The show's format mostly consists of Segura and Pazsitzky talking about and commenting on various videos and clips which are acquired through YouTube, TikTok, fan submission, etc. Through this format, the hosts and the fans of the show commonly use quotes to create a lingo which is used throughout the podcast. Some common phrases from the show include: "high and tight", "cool guy", "cool guy club", "try it out", "good morning, Julia", "full throttle", and "ta ta there, retard". Along with these quotations, Pazsitzky and Segura occasionally refer to each other as "Jeans" which stemmed from calling each other "mommy" and "mom jeans", and they refer to fans of the show as "mommies" as a reference to the title of the show. It is common for fans of the show to use this lingo when referring to the show on social media.

Starting in 2019, fans of the show commonly posted comments on the Instagram page of singer/songwriter Garth Brooks, which was referred to as the "Garth Brooks Instagram Takeover", leading to a restriction of Segura's comments on Garth's Instagram page. The comments used the lingo of the show and commonly asked Brooks questions about where he was keeping the bodies. This line of questioning originated from Segura jokingly calling the singer "insane" and a "serial killer" in numerous episodes.

During a 2022 episode of 2 Bears 1 Cave with guest host Joe Rogan, Segura made jokes at the expense of Erie, Pennsylvania. Erie weatherman David Wolter made jokes regarding Segura not being in the top 100 sexiest bald men awards on a local news show, resulting in fans targeting Wolter's social media. Segura challenged Wolter to a one-on-one game of basketball, which Wolter accepted. Segura won this match, resulting in Wolter having to release an apology video to Segura. Segura also made a donation to a charitable foundation of Wolter's selection, and encouraged others to do so.

Most episodes feature original music from fans that often incorporate samples from the videos played on the show.
