= 2023 in stand-up comedy =

Years in stand-up comedy
- 2019 2020 2021 2022 2023 2024

This is a timeline documenting events and facts about English-speaking stand-up comedy in the year 2023.

== Deaths ==
- April 16: Darryl Lenox dies of an aortic dissection in Vancouver, Canada.

== January ==
- January 5: Nick Whitmer's special Always Hungry on YouTube.
- January 10: Andrew Santino's special Cheeseburger on Netflix.
- January 12: Ron Ervin's special Prodigal Son on YouTube.
- January 19: Joe Hill's special Somebody's Gotta Hear This on YouTube.
- January 26: Phil Pointer's special Sweat it Out on YouTube.
- January 29: Louis CK's special Back To The Garden on Louisck.com.
- January 29: Seaton Smith's special Live at Madison Square Garden on YouTube.
- January 31: Nate Bargatze's special Hello World on Prime Video.

== February ==
- February 2: Brandon Brickz' special Live at The Comedy Store on YouTube.
- February 9: Chase O'Donnell's special People Pleaser on YouTube
- February 11: Marc Maron's special From Bleak to Dark on HBO Max.
- February 13: Roseanne Barr's special Cancel This! on Fox Nation.
- February 14: Natalie Cuomo's special Shut Up You Loved It on YouTube.
- February 14: Jim Jefferies's special High n' Dry on Netflix.
- February 14: Matt Rife's special Matthew Steven Rife on Moment.co.
- February 21: Kathleen Madigan's special Hunting Bigfoot on Prime Video.
- February 21: Sommore's special Queen Chandelier on Netflix.
- February 23: John Franklin's special The Specialist on YouTube.
- February 24: Drew Lynch's special And These Are Jokes.
- February 28: Jamie Demetriou's special A Whole Lifetime with Jamie Demetriou on Netflix.

== March ==
- March 2: Marlon Wayans's special God Loves Me on HBO Max.
- March 2: John McCombs' special Make a Way to Estonia on YouTube.
- March 4: Chris Rock's special Selective Outrage on Netflix.
- March 9: Kelsey Cook's special The Hustler on YouTube.
- March 9: Josh Means' special Josh Means Business on YouTube.
- March 10: Bill Young's album Eat the Cake! on Stand Up! Records.
- March 13: Russell Brand's special Brandemic on Rumble.
- March 14: Bert Kreischer's special Razzle Dazzle on Netflix.
- March 15: Kyle Kinane's special Shocks & Struts on YouTube.
- March 16: Ossia Dwyer's special Knockout on YouTube.
- March 23: Jeremiah Watkins's special DADDY on YouTube.
- March 23: John Grimes' special Going For Broke on YouTube.
- March 24: Mike Vecchione's special The Attractives on YouTube.
- March 28: Mae Martin's special SAP on Netflix.
- March 30: Zack Hammond's special Welfare In Disguise on YouTube.

== April ==
- April 1: Louis C.K.'s special Live at the Dolby Theater on LouisCK.com.
- April 1: Maz Jobrani's special The Birds & The Bees on YouTube.
- April 4: Matt Rife's special Matthew Steven Rife on YouTube.
- April 4: Mo'Nique's special My Name is Mo'Nique on Netflix.
- April 5: Ryan Sickler's special Lefty's Son on YouTube.
- April 5: Big Jay Oakerson's special Dog Belly on YouTube.
- April 6: Papp Johnson's special Timeless on YouTube.
- April 11: Leanne Morgan's special I'm Every Woman on Netflix.
- April 12: Celeste Barber's special Fine, Thanks on Netflix.
- April 13: Brian Roe's special That's My Vibe on YouTube.
- April 14: Auggie Smith's album Taste the Lightning on Stand Up! Records.
- April 18: Alex Borstein's musical comedy special Corsets & Clown Suits on Prime Video.
- April 23: Ashley Gavin’s special Live in Chicago on YouTube.
- April 23: Chris Porter’s special There's No Money In Babies on Helium Comedy Studios.
- April 25: John Mulaney’s special Baby J on Netflix.
- April 27: Jason Salmon's special Biscuits & Gravity on YouTube.
- April 29: Iliza Shlesinger’s present Iliza's Locals on 800 Pound Gorilla Media.

== May ==
- May 2: Jimmy O. Yang's special Guess How Much? on Prime.
- May 4: Eunji Kim's special Live From The Raven Room on YouTube.
- May 2: Lewis Black's special Tragically, I Need You on YouTube.
- May 6: Dave Stone's special Pack a Lunch on YouTube.
- May 9: Hannah Gadsby's special Something Special on Netflix.
- May 11: Tabari McCoy's special Be Happy on YouTube.
- May 15: Anjelah Johnson-Reyes's special Say I Won't on YouTube.
- May 18: Handren Seavey's special XI YRS on YouTube.
- May 23: Wanda Sykes's special I'm An Entertainer on Netflix.
- May 22: Jason Banks's special Light Skinned on YouTube.
- May 24: John Crist's special Would Like to Release a Statement on YouTube.
- May 25: Renee Gauthier's special High Blood Italian on YouTube.
- May 26: Richard Pryor's albums Richard Pryor, Craps (After Hours), and Live At The Comedy Store, 1973 vinyl reissue on Stand Up! Records.
- May 27: Sarah Silverman's special Someone You Love on HBO.
- May 29: JC Currais's special Tequila Werewolf and the Taco Bell Maniac on Don't Tell Comedy.

== June ==
- June 1: David Nihill's special Cultural Appreciation on YouTube.
- June 4: Nigel Ng's special THE HAIYAA SPECIAL on Moment.co.
- June 5: Ali Siddiq's special The Domino Effect 2: Loss on YouTube.
- June 9: Drew Lynch's special SHORT KING on YouTube.
- June 12: Matteo Lane's special Hair Plugs & Heartache on YouTube.
- June 13: Amy Schumer's special Emergency Contact on Netflix.
- June 15: Vik Pandya's special Impromptu Conversations on YouTube.
- June 17: John Early's special Now More Than Ever on HBO.
- June 18: Rob Schneider's special Woke Up In America on Fox Nation.
- June 20: 85 South's special Ghetto Legends on Netflix.
- June 22: Tuxford Turner's special Live From The Raven Room on YouTube.
- June 24: Matt Rife's special Walking Red Flag on YouTube.

== July ==
- July 4: Tom Segura's special Sledgehammer on Netflix.
- July 6: Kevin Hart's special Reality Check on Peacock.
- July 8: Leonard Ouzts's special The Big Joker on YouTube.
- July 13: Vince Carone's special Bad Father on YouTube.
- July 20: Dwight Simmons' special Who's The Master? on YouTube.
- July 21: Geoffrey Asmus's special The Only Funny White Man on YouTube.
- July 25: Mark Normand's special Soup to Nuts on Netflix.
- July 25: Jim Gaffigan's special Dark Pale on Prime.
- July 27: Jamal Guichon's special Down To Clown on YouTube.

== August ==
- August 2: Matt McCusker's special The Speed of Light on YouTube.
- August 3: Ashley Leisten's special Live From The Raven Room on YouTube.
- August 10: Nathan Lund's special Soup's On on YouTube.
- August 15: Jared Freid's special 37 and Single on Netflix.
- August 17: Tracy Morgan's special Takin' It Too Far on HBO.
- August 17: Erick Esteban's special Miscellaneous Brown on YouTube.
- August 19: Adam Ray's special Live From Portland on YouTube.
- August 19: Joe List's special Enough For Everybody on YouTube.
- August 22: Gus Tate's special Top Gus on YouTube.
- August 28: Todd Barry's special Domestic Shorthair on All Things Comedy.
- August 30: Sasheer Zamata's special The First Woman on 800 Pound Gorilla Media.

== September ==
- September 1: Bob The Drag Queen's special Woke Man in a Dress on YouTube.
- September 2: Ian Bagg's special Comedian OFFENDS the Audience on YouTube.
- September 5: Shane Gillis's special Beautiful Dogs on Netflix.
- September 6: Luis J. Gomez's special 30 Minutes on YouTube.
- September 12: Michelle Wolf's special It’s Great To Be Here on Netflix.
- September 13: Colum Tyrrell's special 30 Minutes on YouTube.
- September 14: Django Gold's special Bag of Tricks on YouTube.
- September 19: Kountry Wayne's special A Woman's Prayer on Netflix.
- September 21: Patrick Hastie's special I Will Fight All Of You on YouTube.
- September 22: Tim Slagle's album Bachelorette Party on Stand Up! Records.
- September 23: Sam Jay's special Salute Me or Shoot Me on HBO
- September 26: Chappelle's Home Team – Luenell's special Town Business on Netflix.
- September 28: Will Abeles' special The Pride of Hagerstown on YouTube.

== October ==
- October 3: Beth Stelling's special If You Didn't Want Me Then on Netflix.
- October 6: Gag Reflex's special Live From The Raven Room on YouTube.
- October 6: Joe Pera's special Slow & Steady on YouTube.
- October 12: Tristan A. Smith's special Live From The Raven Room on YouTube.
- October 13: Sage Huston's special Live From The Raven Room on YouTube.
- October 17: Heather McMahan's special Son I Never Had on Netflix.
- October 19: Gabe Kea's special Vaxxed & Waxed on YouTube.
- October 20: Louis Katz's special The Best Comedian You've Never Heard Of on Youtube.
- October 24: Pete Holmes's special I Am Not for Everyone on Netflix.
- October 25: Noel Miller's special Stop Crying on YouTube.
- October 27: Sam Miller's special and album Round Trip on Stand Up! Records
- October 31: Ralph Barbosa's special Cowabunga on Netflix.

== November ==
- November 1: Tyler Ross's special Useless Millennial on YouTube.
- November 2: Cody Hughes' special Hello Fellow Human on YouTube.
- November 7: The Improv: 60 and Still Standing on Netflix.
- November 10: Dina Hashem's special Dark Little Whispers on Amazon Prime.
- November 13: Matteo Lane's special The Advice Special Part 2 on YouTube.
- November 14: Trevor Wallace's special Pterodactyl on Amazon Prime.
- November 15: Whitney Cummings's special Mouthy on OnlyFans.
- November 15: Matt Rife's special Natural Selection on Netflix.
- November 18: Tony Daro's special After A Certain Age They Shouldn't Ask For ID on YouTube.
- November 19: Clint Hall's special When You Have A Really Uncommon Name on YouTube.
- November 20: Ali Siddiq's special Don't Judge a Book By Its Cover on YouTube.
- November 21: Mike Birbiglia's special The Old Man & The Pool on Netflix.
- November 23: Stratton Smith's special Child of Divorce on YouTube.
- November 24: Jim Breuer's special Country Boy Will Survive on YouTube.
- November 24: Armando Anto's special The Divided States of America on YouTube.
- November 27: David Cross's special Worst Daddy in the World on Veeps.com.
- November 28: Verified Stand-Up on Netflix.

== December ==
- December 1: Gwen Sunkel's special A Two Person Job on YouTube.
- December 4: Nick Mullen's special The Year of the Dragon on YouTube.
- December 5: Stavros Halkias's special Fat Rascal on Netflix.
- December 10: Shane Torres's special The Blue Eyed Mexican on YouTube.
- December 12: Maria Bamford's special Local Act on Apple TV.
- December 14: Mark Chalifoux's special Mark Chalifoux's Christmas Special on YouTube.
- December 16: Leo Reich's special Literally Who Cares?! on HBO.
- December 19: Trevor Noah's special Where Was I on Netflix.
- December 21: Gary Gulman's special Born on Third Base on HBO.
- December 25: Ricky Gervais's special Armageddon on Netflix.
- December 27: Sam Tallent's special The Toad's Morale on YouTube.
- December 31: Dave Chappelle's special The Dreamer on Netflix.
- December 31: Aaron Naylor's special Born Illiterate on YouTube.

== See also ==
- List of stand-up comedians
- List of Netflix original stand-up comedy specials
