= Adam Hartle =

American stand-up comedian (born 1979)

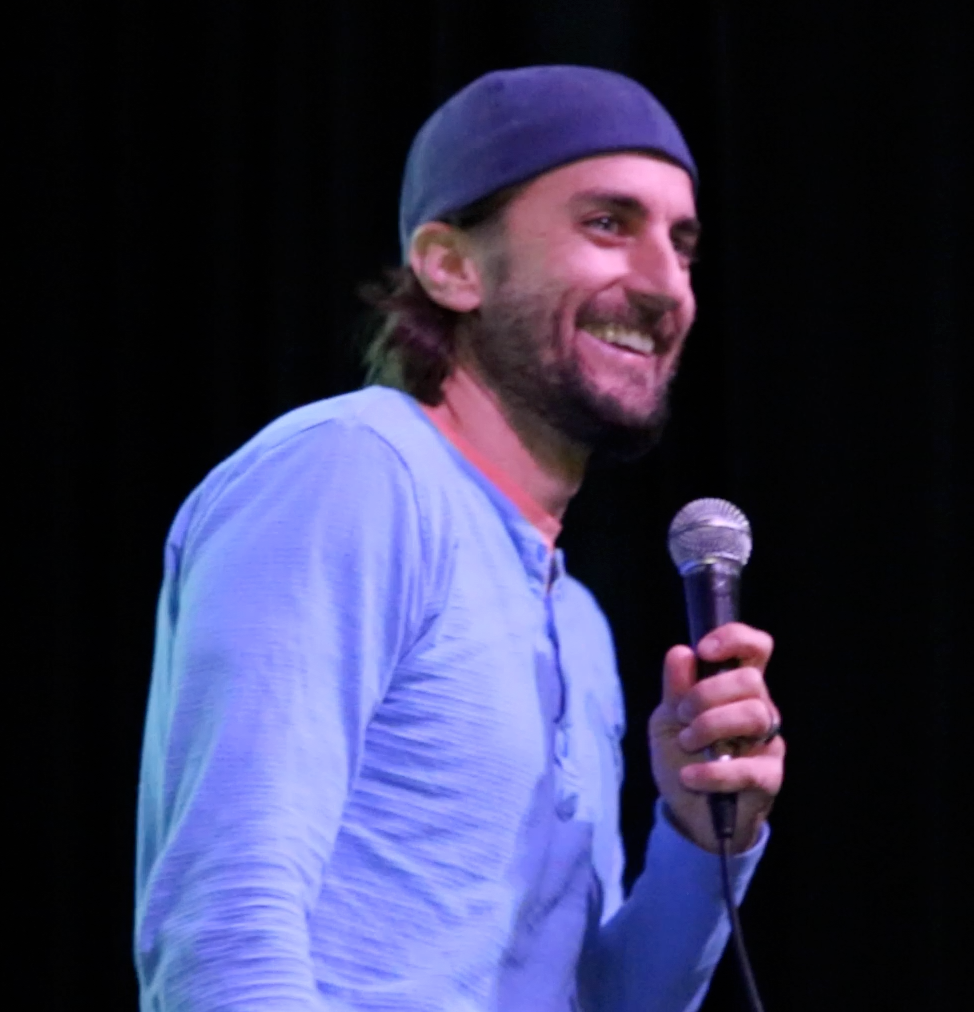
- Occupation: Comedian
- Years active: 2011–2022
- Known for: Stand up comedy/ film
- Notable work: "Mile High- The Comeback of Cannabis" "The Blunt Truth" tour
- Style: Visual comic
- Television: HBO's Vice
- Movement: Cannabis legalization
- Awards: 2016 North Florida Comedian of the Year

Adam Hartle was an American stand-up comedian.

== Comedy career ==
Hartle first made national headlines in 2012 during filming of his comedy documentary Mile High: The Comeback of Cannabis where he and director Anthony Hashem purchased the first joints legally sold in US history (2nd official purchase). The film enjoyed much critical acclaim including a notable scene, during an interview with former Congressman and Presidential candidate Tom Tancredo where Hartle bet the Congressman that if the marijuana vote passed in Colorado, the two would smoke a legal joint together. In 2014, Hartle and the film's director Anthony Hashem debuted their film at the historic Mayan Theater in Denver, CO. The world premiere garnered much media attention both nationally and internationally as the comedian handed out free cannabis legally to all those in attendance, a first in movie viewing history, to all those over 21 per the new law documented in the film.

Hartle performed at some of the best comedy clubs in the world including the Icehouse in Pasadena and the Comedy Store in Hollywood.
