= Brody Stevens =

American comedian (1970–2019)

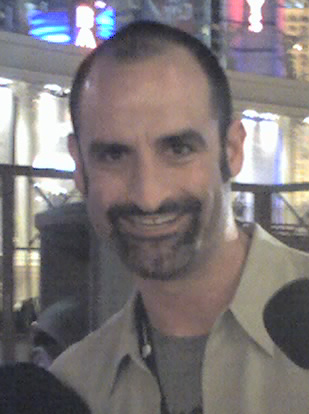
- Stevens in 2007
- Born: Steven James Brody; May 22, 1970; Los Angeles, California, U.S.
- Died: February 22, 2019 (aged 48); Los Angeles, California, U.S.
- Other name: Steven Brody Stevens
- Occupations: Stand-up comedian; actor

Comedy career
- Years active: 1999–2019
- Medium: Stand-up, television, movies
- Website: BrodyStevens.com (archive)

Steven James Brody (May 22, 1970 – February 22, 2019), known professionally as Brody Stevens, was an American stand-up comedian and actor. He starred in the Comedy Central reality series Brody Stevens: Enjoy It!, and was known for appearances on Chelsea Lately and other comedy shows as well as roles in films such as The Hangover (2009) and Due Date (2010).

== Early life ==
Stevens was born Steven Brody in Los Angeles, California on May 22, 1970 to Jaqueline Stevens and Harold Morris Brody, a private investigator from Phoenix. His family is originally from New Mexico and Arizona and Stevens has described them as the "pioneering Jews of the southwest". Stevens was raised in Los Angeles, and briefly enrolled in private school until his mother decided he would attend public school. The family moved to Sacramento during Stevens' early childhood. After his parents divorced when Stevens was eight years old, he lived with his mother and older sister in the San Fernando Valley. Stevens did not go to Hebrew School nor read from the Torah for his Bar Mitzvah. In 1982, Stevens attended a nondenominational Christian church with his father, who was dating a member of the choir.

He attended Reseda High School, excelling on the baseball team as a right-handed pitcher. His highs included striking out 10 batters on multiple occasions (he was often clocked on the radar gun at 88 MPH with movement), while his lows included balking in runs in playoff games. Stevens went on to earn a scholarship to play Division I College Baseball for the Arizona State Sun Devils baseball program, starting in four games, pitching 28, innings and recording 3 saves. He graduated with a 2.52 GPA.

== Career ==
Stevens first tried stand-up in Los Angeles, before moving to Seattle, where he began developing an act, in addition to co-creating and co-starring in a public-access television show with Teina Manu called Brody and Teina that garnered a cult following. His career continued for a three-year stint in New York City, before he found a home on the Los Angeles comedy scene.

Stevens appeared on the television shows Late Night with Conan O'Brien, Jimmy Kimmel Live!, Late Friday, Premium Blend, The Late Late Show with Craig Kilborn, The Test with Jillian Barberie, Late World with Zach, The Best Damn Sports Show Period, Attack of the Show!, Childrens Hospital, Tosh.0, TMZ on TV, Fox NFL Sunday, Conan, Comedy Bang! Bang!, The Burn with Jeff Ross, Kroll Show, The Ben Show and @midnight. He was also a regular panelist on Chelsea Lately.

In 2010, Stevens launched his own podcast The Brody Stevens Experiment. Only three episodes were released. On October 7, 2011 Stevens began co-hosting Brode & Esther, a podcast for the Deathsquad network with fellow stand-up comedians Esther Povitsky and Brian Redban. 15 episodes have been released.

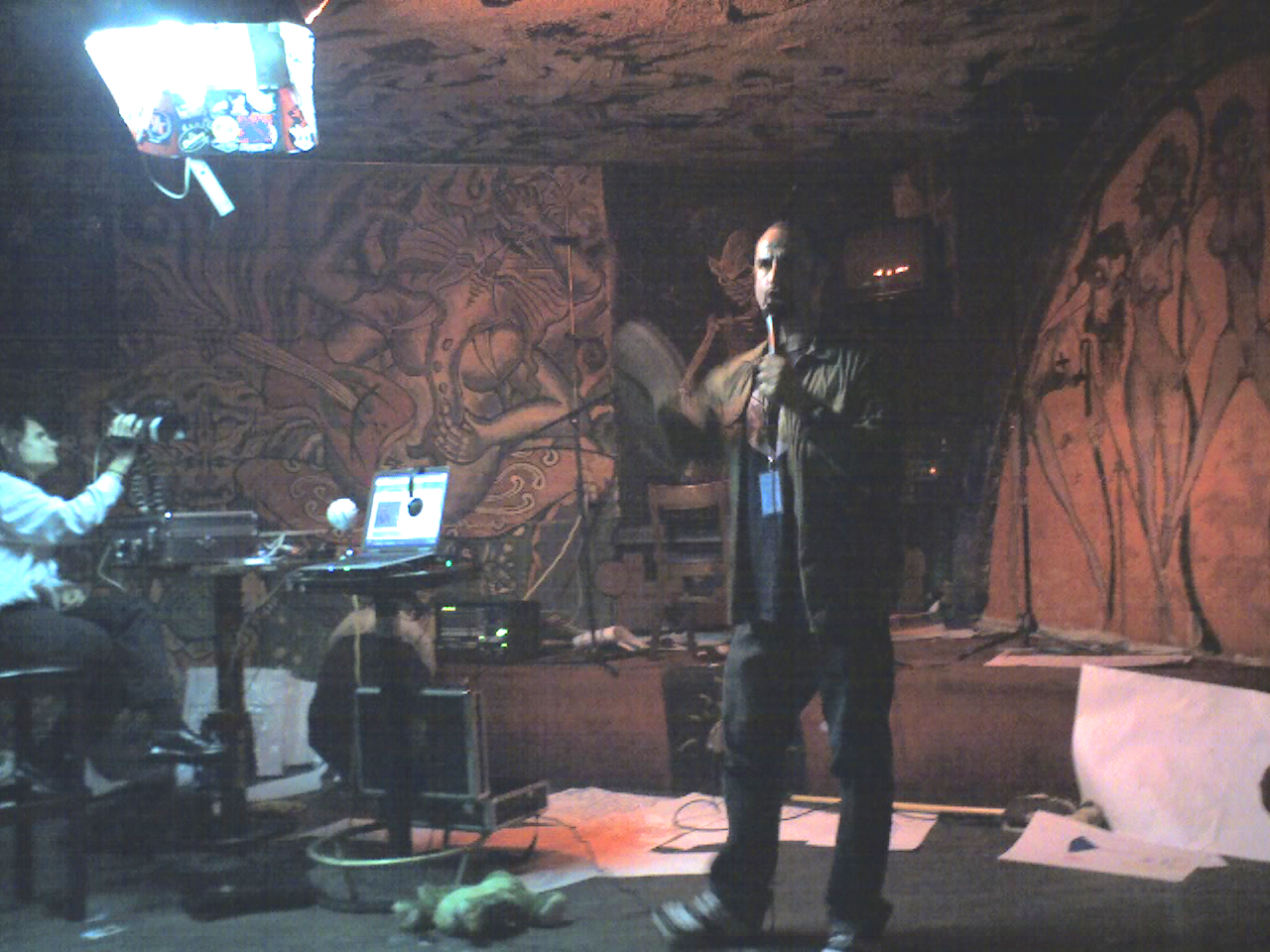
Stevens performing at the Double Down Saloon in Las Vegas, 2007

In 2011, Stevens starred in and produced a documentary comedy series for HBO called Brody Stevens: Enjoy It!. Zach Galifianakis was an executive producer on the project. It was released in 2012 as six 15-minute episodes on HBO's digital platform HBO GO and received positive reviews. Following the popularity of his HBO program it was picked up by Comedy Central as Brody Stevens: Enjoy It!. The footage was shot by HBO, along with additional material shot by Comedy Central, and was released in 2013 as twelve 21-minute episodes.

Stevens also worked as an audience warm-up performer for several television programs, including The Best Damn Sports Show Period, Late World with Zach, The Man Show, Chelsea Lately, The Burn with Jeff Ross, The Jeselnik Offensive, Rob Dyrdek's Ridiculousness, Who Gets the Last Laugh?, @midnight, The Exes, and Why? with Hannibal Buress.

Stevens also appeared in the films Road to Park City, Jesus Is Magic (2005), The Hangover (2009), I Am Comic (2010), Due Date (2010), and The Hangover Part II (2011). He also appeared in a minor role in Funny People (2009), but his scenes were ultimately cut from the film.

Stevens launched another podcast on May 13, 2012 called The Steven Brody Stevens Festival of Friendship on the Feral Audio network. The podcast was a mixture of Stevens talking about his career and personal life, involving his producer Dustin Marshall and interviewing his friends from throughout the comedy world. 69 episodes were released. On November 13, 2013 Stevens launched his latest podcasting venture as the host of Positive Push on the Video Podcast Network YouTube channel, an affiliate of the Jash network.

Stevens was also a frequent podcast guest. He regularly appeared on podcasts produced by Brian Redban's Deathsquad network such as Kill Tony with Tony Hinchcliffe, What Brian Redban Do, and appeared on The Joe Rogan Experience as well as The Naughty Show with Sam Tripoli. Stevens also had a presence in the alternative comedy podcast scene, appearing as a contestant on Doug Loves Movies and guest on Earwolf podcasts such as Who Charted? with Howard Kremer and Kulap Vilaysack. In addition, Stevens regularly appeared as a guest on Jay Mohr's sports radio show Jay Mohr Sports.

Stevens performed in a wide range of comedy clubs across Los Angeles and was famous for his late-night spots at the Comedy Store. On February 27, 2013, Stevens taped a live comedy set at The Royale in Boston for the second season of Comedy Central's The Half Hour. While in Boston, he also recorded a series of interviews with the other 16 comedians appearing on The Half Hour called Push & Believe. It was released on Comedy Central's YouTube channel in December 2013. Through the summer of 2013, he traveled the country performing on the Oddball Comedy Tour headlined by Dave Chappelle.

In 2018, Stevens served as a co-host on the Barstool Sports SiriusXM radio show, Dialed in with Dallas, hosted by former MLB Pitcher Dallas Braden.

== Death ==
On February 22, 2019, Stevens was found dead in his Los Angeles home. An autopsy determined that he died by suicide. He was 48 years old. He had been suffering from bipolar disorder at the time of his death.

Stevens' website went offline between April and May 2020.

== Filmography ==
Year	Title	Role	Notes
1999	Late Night with Conan O'Brien	Unknown	TV series
2000	Knights of the Heights	Bull	Short
2000	Road to Park City	Brody Stevens	Film
2000–03	The Late Late Show with Craig Kilborn	Stand-up / Brody Stevens / Sketch	TV series
2001	Premium Blend	Himself	TV series
2001	Late Friday	Himself	TV series
2002	Meet My Folks	Delivery Guy	TV series
2002	The Best Damn Sports Show Period	Sketch	TV series
2003	Jimmy Kimmel Live!	Publicist	TV series
2005	Sarah Silverman: Jesus Is Magic	Jewish Agent	Film
2006	Attack of the Show!	Osama	TV series
2007	Tim and Eric Nite Live!	Uncle Vance	TV series
2007	I'll Believe You	Eldon Endicott, the Hoagie guy	Film
2007	Stupidface	unknown	TV series
2007	That's My Daughter	Hunky Trainer / Rival Gang Leader	TV series
2008	Gaytown	Mayor Stevens	TV series
2008	Comedy Gumbo	Hank Kern	Web series
2008	Blind Ambition	Male Announcer	Film
2009	Tosh.0	Himself	TV series
2009	All-Stars	Brody	TV series
2009	The Hangover	Officer Foltz	Film
2009	Kicking Sand in Your Face	7/11 Guy	Short
2009–12	Chelsea Lately	Himself / Himself – Round Table	TV series
2010	I Am Comic	Himself	Documentary
2010	Due Date	Limo Driver	Film
2010	Cubed	Police Officer	TV series
2010	Funny or Die Presents	Announcer	TV series
2010	Ed Hardy Boyz: The Case of the Missing Sick Belt Buckle	Affliction D-bag	Short
2011	Tosh.0	Sportscaster	TV series
2011	Childrens Hospital	Father	TV series
2011	The Hangover Part II	Kingsley Guy	Film
2011	Mad	Cop / Gossip Girl Baby / Teddy (voice)	TV series
2012	Couchers	The Legally Dead Guy	Web series
2012	First Look: Ultimate Teaser Trailer	Trailer Actor	Short
2012	Alone Up There	Himself	Documentary
2012	The Burn with Jeff Ross	Himself	TV series
2012	Conan	Himself – Comic Guest	TV series
2012	The Naughty Show	Himself	TV series
2012–15	Comedy Bang! Bang!	Referencee / Referee	TV series
2013	The Ben Show	Himself	TV series
2013–14	Brody Stevens: Enjoy It!	Himself	TV series
2013–14	Kroll Show	Steven Dykstra / Lance "Lactic Acid"	TV series
2014	Tom Green Live	Himself	TV series
2014	Morgan Murphy: Irish Goodbye	Announcer	Comedy special
2014	The Meltdown with Jonah and Kumail	Himself	TV series
2014	The Playboy Morning Show	Himself	TV series
2014	Last Call with Carson Daly	Himself	TV series
2014	@midnight	Himself	TV series
2014	The Half Hour	Himself	TV series
2015	Adventure Time	Guardian of the Mountain (voice)	TV series
2016	Those Who Can't	Union President Tarkington	TV series
2017	Do You Want to See a Dead Body?	Brody	TV series
2018	American Dad!	Priest (voice)	TV series; Last role
