= Brian Redban =

American podcast producer

- Born: Brian Reichle; August 4, 1974 (age 52); Columbus, Ohio, U.S.
- Occupations: Podcast producer and host
- Notable work: Kill Tony, The Joe Rogan Experience, Deathsquad podcast network

Brian Reichle (born August 4, 1974), known professionally as Brian Redban or simply Redban (also stylized as redban), is an American podcast producer and host. He is the original producer and co-host of The Joe Rogan Experience, co-host of the live stand-up comedy podcast Kill Tony, and the founder of the Deathsquad podcast network, the original publishing network of the Your Mom's House podcast. In 2023, Redban became the co-owner of the Sunset Strip Comedy Club alongside Anthony Hashem and Christina Alvarado.

== Early life ==
Redban was born Brian Reichle in Columbus, Ohio. He was self-taught in video editing and was working at Gateway 2000 when Joe Rogan hired him to film, produce and edit videos full-time.

== Career ==
=== The Joe Rogan Experience ===
After producing videos for Doug Stanhope, and after receiving severance from the closure of the Gateway 2000 computer store where he was employed, Redban accepted an offer from Rogan to film him during comedy tours. His interest in live streaming services led him to expand his video production. The Joe Rogan Experience launched on December 24, 2009, and Redban remained the sole producer until late 2013 when Jamie Vernon was hired to help with an increased number of podcasts. Vernon subsequently took over as the full time producer of the show. Redban has since been a guest on the show many times.

Redban filmed the confrontation between Carlos Mencia and Joe Rogan in 2007.

=== Deathsquad podcast network ===
The first episode of the Deathsquad podcast aired on August 1, 2009, and the first episode of Your Mom's House podcast was released November 24, 2010. Redban also hosted the podcast entitled Icehouse Chronicles. Redban was a co-host of the Brode & Esther podcast alongside Esther Povitsky and the late Brody Stevens. The first episode was released on October 7, 2011 and there were seventeen episodes released.

=== Kill Tony ===
Redban has been co-host and producer of the stand-up comedy podcast show Kill Tony alongside main host Tony Hinchcliffe since 2013. Originally recorded at The Comedy Store in Los Angeles, California, the show was later relocated to Austin, Texas for its 487th episode.

=== Deathsquad Secret Show ===
Redban hosts the Deathsquad Secret Show, a live comedy show featuring unannounced comedians. The pilot episode was released on December 8, 2012.

=== Other appearances ===
In 2017, Redban appeared on an episode of the comedy game show @Midnight with Chris Hardwick. In July 2018, Redban appeared on the two-day Skankfest event, hosted by the Legion of Skanks (Big Jay Oakerson, Dave Smith, and Luis J. Gomez). He appeared again on Skankfest South in November 2021.

== Sunset Strip Comedy Club ==
In early 2023, Redban was approached by Anthony Hashem as a prospective investor for the Sunset Strip Comedy Club in Austin, Texas, where Kill Tony is also hosted. His interest was immediate, and the club preliminarily opened in April of that year with one of Redban's long-running Deathsquad Secret Shows.
