= Sam Tallent =

American comedian and author (born 1987)

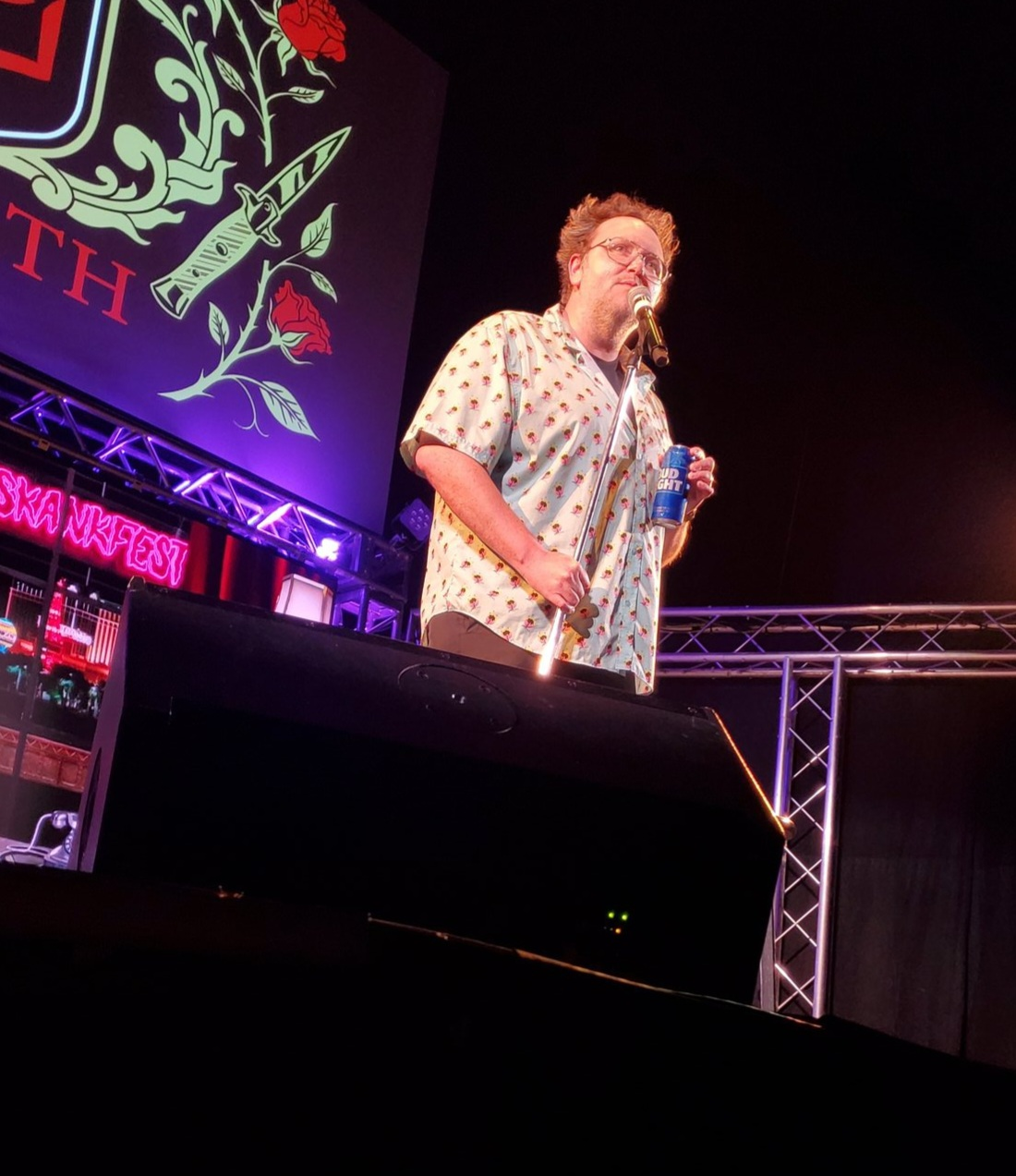
- Tallent performing at SkankFest in Las Vegas, 2023
- Born: May 2, 1987 (age 39); Elizabeth, Colorado, U.S.
- Education: Metropolitan State University of Denver

Comedy career
- Years active: 2008–present
- Medium: Stand-up; Podcast; Writer
- Genres: Black comedy; blue humor; surreal humor; anti-humor
- Website: www.samtallent.com

Sam Bayard Tallent (born May 2, 1987) is an American stand-up comedian, author, and podcaster.

== Early life ==
Tallent was raised in Elizabeth, Colorado.

== Career ==
Tallent's Career started in 2008 where he started traveling across the American West and Midwest to do shows at smaller venues in rural towns. Tallent’s first comedy special, Waiting For Death to Claim Us, was released on Amazon Prime, AppleTV, and YouTube. The special was listed amongst the Top 10 Comedy Specials of 2021 by both Decider and Interrobang. It possesses the distinction as the last comedy special filmed before the COVID lockdown; shooting wrapped on the final evening before shows and indoor gatherings were furloughed for nearly two years.

In December 2023, Tallent performed a new special, The Toad's Morale. He is the host of the Chubby Behemoth Podcast alongside his best friend and co-host Nathan Lund. Since 2010, Tallent has toured across North America, Asia, Australia, and Europe.

In May 2020, Tallent published Running the Light via his publishing house, Too Big To Fail Press - the audio book rights sold at auction in 2021. (*Note: Garth Ennis did NOT write a screenplay on this). His novella, Attaboy, was published as an Audible Original in 2022. In 2024, it was announced that he had signed a deal with Random House to publish Running the Light as well as further literary works including his following novel; "Brut: A Novel". As of June 18, 2025, Running the Light was available in Spanish under the title Sin Supervivientes.

Tallent has performed at Skankfest Comedy Festival, Comedy Central, Just for Laughs Montreal Comedy Festival Black Hills Comedy Festival and SXSW Comedy Festival. He has made appearances on The Joe Rogan Experience, Kill Tony, The Chris Gethard Show and Viceland's Flophouse.

Since February 2024, Tallent has produced a comedic travel documentary titled: Sam Tallent's Wide World in which he writes, directs, narrates and co-hosts. The episodic format features Tallent alongside life-long friends Nathan Lund, Patrick Richardson, David Gborie and Jacob Becker, traveling the globe while offering humorous and satirical insight on local cultures and attractions. Locations visited include Tokyo, Yokohama, Paris, Eastern Colorado, Rome, Key West and New Zealand. Episodes are published to Tallent's YouTube channel.

Tallent has been a guest on podcasts including Matt and Shanes Secret Podcast, Tony Hinchcliffe's Kill Tony, The Adam Friedland Show, Joe Rogan Experience, Have A Word, Barstool Sports Dr. Drew After Dark, Marc Maron's WTF podcast, Tim Dillon's podcast, Chris Distefano's podcast, The Danny Brown Show and James Donald Forbes McCann's podcast.

== Personal life ==
Tallent is married to Dr. Emily Tallent. He currently resides in Detroit, Michigan. He graduated from Metropolitan State University of Denver in 2022 with a degree in Public Address and Rhetoric.

== Influences ==
Tallent draws inspiration from rock bands Lightning Bolt and Minutemen, novelists Denis Johnson and Cormac McCarthy, and comedian Norm Macdonald.

== Works ==
=== Comedy Specials ===
- Waiting For Death to Claim Us (2021)
- The Toad's Morale (2023)

=== Books ===
- Brut: A Novel (2026)
- Running the Light (2020)
- Attaboy (2022)
