= Bad Thoughts =

American comedy television series

- Genre: Dark comedy
- Created by: Tom Segura
- Starring: Tom Segura
- Music by: Pinar Toprak & Gerrit Wunder
- Country of origin: United States
- Original language: English
- No. of seasons: 2
- No. of episodes: 12

Production
- Executive producers: Tom Segura; Ryan P. Hall; Jeremy Konner; Rami Hachache; Molly Mandel; Craig Gerard; Matthew Zinman
- Producer: Clay Vannortwick
- Cinematography: Nicholas Wiesnet
- Editors: John Cason; Marissa Mueller; Andrew Ratzlaff; Jeff Seibenick; Varun Viswanath; Rami Hachache
- Running time: 17–22 minutes
- Production company: YMH Studios

Original release
- Network: Netflix
- Release: May 13, 2025 – present

Bad Thoughts is an American dark sketch comedy television series created by Tom Segura for Netflix. It stars Segura, alongside an ensemble cast that includes Daniella Pineda, Robert Iler, Arturo Castro, Kirk Fox, Christina Pazsitzky, Tim Baltz, Dan Stevens, and Jimmy Kimmel. The series premiered on Netflix on May 13, 2025.

Structured as a series of vignettes, the show explores darkly comedic and provocative themes. It was produced by YMH Studios in association with Netflix.

One vignette centers on Rex Henley (Segura), a global country music star who, after losing his creative drive, resorts to kidnapping his fans and forcing them to live in an impoverished town. There, he compels them to reveal their most personal and traumatic experiences in hopes of finding inspiration for a new hit song.

In June 2025, the series was renewed for a second season which premiered on May 24, 2026. It has been nominated for two 2026 Emmy Awards as the Outstanding Short Form Comedy, Drama or Variety Series, and for Segura, as the Outstanding Performer in a Short Form Comedy or Drama Series.

== Premise ==
A collection of hilariously disturbing stories that push the boundaries of decency in ways only Tom Segura could imagine.

— Netflix

== Cast ==
- Tom Segura as himself, Agent Six, Massimo, Cyrus, Steven Seagal, Rex Henley, Joe, Brigitte, Barry the Sandwich Guy, and Mr. Hale
- Daniella Pineda as Mrs. King
- Robert Iler as Evan
- Arturo Castro as James Gonzalez and Jose
- Arnold Chun as Byung Sung
- Alexis Abrams as Emily
- Shea Whigham as PQ
- Hannah Bittick as TikTok influencer
- John Gholson as Oliver
- Christina Pazsitzky as Christina
- Kirk Fox as Roger and himself
- Ryan Sickler as Brad
- Alexandra Chando as Kerri Sorenson
- Kirsten Kendall as Seagal Sidekick
- Alexandra Broussard as French Market Girl
- Billie D. Merritt as Erica
- Jenn Covington as Daisy
- Bobby Lee as Carl
- Malin Barr as Kati
- Sarah Burns as Lilly
- Dan Stevens as Allain Fletcher and Gary Crawford
- Tim Baltz as Simon and Jerry
- Johnny Pemberton as Jesus and Barry
- Jamie-Lynn Sigler as Nancy
- Luke Wilson as Mark
- Martha Kelly as Natalie
- Kevin Nealon as Dr. Futtrell
- Floriana Lima as Anna
- Rachel Bloom as Sarah
- Odette Annable as Catalina
- Miles Anderson as Saint Peter
- Busy Philipps as Suzanne
- Frankie Quiñones as Alvaro
- John Ennis as Thomas
- Maria Bamford as Barbara
- Mike Mitchell as Teddy
- Allegra Edwards as Celeste Marlow
- Lyric Lewis as herself
- Joe Rogan as himself
- Jimmy Kimmel as himself

== Episodes ==
=== Season 1 (2025) ===
No.	Title	Directed by	Written by	Original release date
1	Jobs	Rami Hachache; Jeremy Konner	Tom Segura; Jeremy Konner; Rami Hachache; Craig Gerard & Matthew Zinman; Conor Galvin; Greg Tuculescu	May 13, 2025
2	Success	Rami Hachache; Jeremy Konner	Tom Segura; Jeremy Konner; Rami Hachache; Craig Gerard & Matthew Zinman; Conor Galvin; Greg Tuculescu	May 13, 2025
3	Family	Rami Hachache; Jeremy Konner; Tom Segura	Tom Segura; Jeremy Konner; Rami Hachache; Craig Gerard & Matthew Zinman; Conor Galvin; Greg Tuculescu	May 13, 2025
4	Love	Rami Hachache; Jeremy Konner; Tom Segura	Tom Segura; Jeremy Konner; Rami Hachache; Craig Gerard & Matthew Zinman; Conor Galvin; Greg Tuculescu	May 13, 2025
5	Communication	Rami Hachache; Jeremy Konner	Tom Segura; Jeremy Konner; Rami Hachache; Craig Gerard & Matthew Zinman; Conor Galvin; Greg Tuculescu	May 13, 2025
6	Health	Jeremy Konner; Tom Segura	Tom Segura; Jeremy Konner; Rami Hachache; Craig Gerard & Matthew Zinman; Conor Galvin; Greg Tuculescu	May 13, 2025

=== Season 2 (2026) ===
No.	Title	Directed by	Written by	Original release date
1	Bad Impulses	Rami Hachache; Jeremy Konner; Tyler Cornack	Unknown	May 24, 2026
2	Bad Perspectives	Rami Hachache; Jeremy Konner	Unknown	May 24, 2026
3	Bad News	Rami Hachache; Jeremy Konner; Tyler Cornack	Unknown	May 24, 2026
4	Bad Influences	Rami Hachache; Jeremy Konner	Unknown	May 24, 2026
5	Bad Romance	Rami Hachache; Tom Segura; Tyler Cornack	Unknown	May 24, 2026
6	Bad Decisions	Rami Hachache; Tyler Cornack	Unknown	May 24, 2026

== Production ==
In April 2024, it was reported that Tom Segura had self-financed a pilot episode for a series which had been subsequently sold to Netflix. In addition to leading the cast, Segura is the show's creator, director, and executive producer. Rami Hachache and Jeremy Konner also direct episodes. The producing team includes Segura, Konner, Hachache, Ryan Hall, Molly Mandel, Craig Gerard, and Matthew Zinman. The series is produced by Your Mom's House. The cast includes Christina Pazsitzky. In June 2025, Netflix renewed the series for a second season.

== Release ==
The series premiered on Netflix on May 13, 2025. The second season premiered on May 24, 2026.

== Reception ==
=== Critical response ===
A review from Los Angeles Times critic Ali Lerman describes Bad Thoughts as a "fever dream" of dark comedy, highlighting its unhinged and twisted narratives. The series has been noted for pushing comedic boundaries and delivering a unique viewing experience.

The review aggregator website Rotten Tomatoes reported a 54% approval rating based on 13 critic reviews. The website's critics consensus reads, "You'll laugh, but you might not be proud afterwards." Metacritic, which uses a weighted average, gave a score of 55 out of 100 based on 5 critics, indicating "mixed or average" reviews.

=== Viewership ===
According to data from Showlabs, Bad Thoughts ranked sixth on Netflix in the United States during the week of May 12–18, 2025.
