= Christina Pazsitzky =

Canadian-American comedian (born 1976)

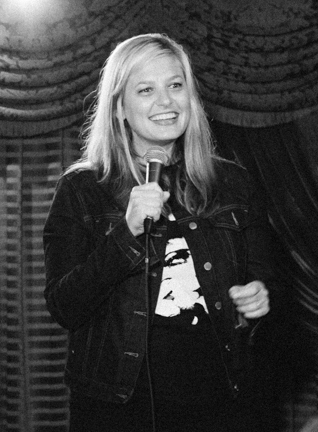
- Pazsitzky in 2013
- Born: June 18, 1976 (age 50); Windsor, Ontario, Canada
- Spouse: Tom Segura (m. 2008; sep. 2026)
- Children: 2

Comedy career
- Years active: 1997–present
- Medium: Stand-up, podcasting
- Website: christinap.com

Christina Pazsitzky (born June 18, 1976), known by her stage name Christina P, is a Canadian-born American stand-up comedian and podcaster. She co-hosts the Your Mom's House podcast with her former husband and fellow comedian Tom Segura, and also hosts the Where My Moms At? podcast.

== Early life ==
Pazsitzky was born in Windsor, Ontario, Canada, to Hungarian parents who had escaped from Hungary in 1969 during the rule of the Hungarian People's Republic. Her family relocated to the United States in her early childhood, settling in Southern California, where she was raised.

She enrolled at the University of San Francisco, where she graduated with a degree in philosophy in 1999. She briefly attended law school in the United Kingdom at the University of Oxford, but dropped out.

== Career ==
Pazsitzky's television debut was in 1998 as a cast member of MTV's Road Rules: Down Under.

She was a member of the Deathsquad Network of stand-up comedians. Pazsitzky has performed in the Middle East, Africa, and South Korea with USO tours.

In 2012, Your Mom's House was one of the six nominees in the Best Comedy category at the first annual Stitcher Awards for podcasts.

In 2018, Pazsitzky and Segura landed a TV deal with CBS, who gave a pilot production commitment for their show The Little Things.

=== Where My Moms At? podcast ===
Where My Moms At?
- Genre: Talk; Comedy; Motherhood
- Format: Audio; video
- Language: English

Cast and voices
- Hosted by: Christina Pazsitzky

Production
- Production: YMH Studios
- Length: 50–110 m (160–360 ft)

Technical specifications
- Video format: YouTube
- Audio format: MP3

Publication
- No. of episodes: 180+
- Original release: June 6, 2019

Related
- Website: wheremymomsat.com

Pazsitzky hosts Where My Moms At?, a comedy podcast based around real issues in the world of motherhood. Episodes often feature guests from the world of entertainment and pop culture, such as Hila Klein, Alyssa Milano, Alison Rosen, and LeeAnn Kreischer, wife of comedian Bert Kreischer.

== Personal life ==
In early 2020, Pazsitzky and Segura bought a $6.7 million mansion in Pacific Palisades, Los Angeles.

Pazsitzky and Segura moved to Austin, Texas, in 2021.

In 2024, Pazsitzky was diagnosed with breast cancer and required multiple surgeries to treat her illness.

In July 2026, multiple outlets reported that Pazsitzky and her husband, comedian Tom Segura, had separated after 18 years of marriage. According to a report from TMZ, the couple, who married in 2008 and have two sons, separated within the last couple of months prior to the report and described the split as "completely amicable." They co-founded YMH Studios and are expected to continue co-hosting their podcast, Your Mom's House, together. On August 5, 2026, Pazsitzky confirmed the divorce on an episode of Your Mom's House.

== Stand-up comedy specials ==
=== Albums ===
Year	Title	Notes
2011	It's Hard Being a Person	CD
2015	Man of the Year	CD
2017	Mother Inferior	Streaming special
2022	Mom Genes	Streaming special

=== TV appearances ===
Year	Title	Notes
2018	The Degenerates	Stand-up comedy series

== Filmography ==
=== Television ===
Year	Title	Role	Notes
1998	Road Rules: Down Under	Herself	
2003	Real World/Road Rules Challenge: Battle of the Sexes	Herself	
2008	April & Christina	Herself	
2012	StandUp in Stilettos	Herself	Episode 5
2015	Can We Take a Joke?	Herself	Documentary
2025	Bad Thoughts	Christina	Episode 3
