= Mile High: The Comeback of Cannabis =

- Film poster
- Directed by: Anthony Hashem
- Written by: Anthony Hashem; Adam Hartle
- Starring: Adam Hartle
- Release date: 2014
- Country: United States

Mile High: The Comeback of Cannabis is a 2014 documentary film directed by Anthony Hashem and featuring comedian activist Adam Hartle.

To promote the film, Hartle and Hashem distributed free cannabis at screenings in Colorado, where marijuana is legal.
