= Brody Stevens: Enjoy It! =

- Created by: Zach Galifianakis; Mike Gibbons
- Starring: Brody Stevens; Zach Galifianakis
- No. of seasons: 1
- No. of episodes: 12

Production
- Running time: 30 minutes
- Production companies: Funny or Die; Run and Gun Productions; Billios Productions

Original release
- Network: Comedy Central
- Release: December 1, 2013 – January 4, 2014

Brody Stevens: Enjoy It! is a television series on Comedy Central. The series was a documentary that followed the life of comedian Brody Stevens alongside Zach Galifianakis.

== Episodes ==
No.	Title	Original release date	U.S. viewers (millions)
1	"Brody Stevens, Who Are You?"	December 1, 2013	N/A
Brody attempts to reconcile with his estranged sister in time for their mother's 80th birthday.
2	"Breakdown!"	December 1, 2013	N/A
Brody decides to stop taking his medicine cold turkey and experiences a manic episode which affects his family and friends.
3	"I'm Sorry, Chelsea"	December 8, 2013	N/A
Brody apologizes to Chelsea Handler after quitting his job on Chelsea Lately, in an angry temperamental fashion.
4	"Oklahoma Cupid"	December 8, 2013	N/A
Brody goes on a blind date with a girl from Oklahoma.
5	"Nose Business Like Show Business"	December 15, 2013	N/A
Zach encourages Brody to take acting and improv classes to sharpen his skills, and Brody opens up about getting cut from Judd Apatow's film Funny People.
6	"Conan!"	December 15, 2013	N/A
Brody appears for an appearance on Conan.
7	"What Nose Up.... Must Come Down"	December 22, 2013	N/A
Brody's friends rally around when he goes into a deep depression; Zach Galifianakis encourages Brody to volunteer at a soup kitchen.
8	"Face Time"	December 22, 2013	N/A
Brody goes to a hypnotherapist to help him overcome his facial dysmorphia issues; then hires a matchmaker to help him get chicks.
9	"Smoke and Believe"	December 29, 2013	N/A
Brody crashes the Hangover Part III premiere and reconciles with an old friend. Tension mounts with his crew over his pot use, angry outbursts and their fears that he will have another manic episode.
10	"Jews and Samoans Rule Seattle"	December 29, 2013	N/A
Brody and Teina revisit their old neighborhood on the way to mounting a live reunion show.
11	"Boston Me Party;"	January 4, 2014	N/A
Brody films his half-hour comedy special and interviews 17 other comedians for Comedy Central.
12	"Born in the Valley; Hollywood Finale"	January 4, 2014	N/A
Brody dates a new woman, takes a trip to Miami, and throws a rooftop birthday party.
