= Kaseem Bentley =

American stand-up comedian

- Born: United States

Comedy career
- Medium: Stand-up comedy
- Genres: African-American culture, insult comedy, observational comedy, black comedy, sarcasm, race relations, racism
- Subjects: American culture, everyday life, human behavior, American politics, pop culture

Kaseem Bentley is an American stand-up comedian.

SF Weekly has described Bentley's humor as the "best racial humor you don't feel guilty laughing at," and touches on racial stereotypes without being racist, challenges conventions of being politically correct or nice on stage, yet keeps the audience on his side by turning the insults on himself and keeping them funny.

On May 3, 2019, Bentley released his debut comedy album Lakeview. The album is named after the San Francisco neighborhood he grew up in.
