= The Burn with Jeff Ross =

- Genre: Comedy
- Created by: Jeff Ross
- Directed by: Jay Karas
- Presented by: Jeff Ross
- Starring: Jeff Ross
- Narrated by: Gilbert Gottfried
- Country of origin: United States
- Original language: English
- No. of seasons: 2
- No. of episodes: 12

Production
- Executive producers: Jeff Ross; Mike Gibbons; Chris McGuire; Willie Mercer; Amy Zvi
- Running time: 20 minutes
- Production companies: Tagline Television; Enough With the Bread Already Productions; New Boots Productions

Original release
- Network: Comedy Central
- Release: August 14, 2012 – February 12, 2013

The Burn with Jeff Ross is a comedy panel show hosted by comedian Jeff Ross that aired on Comedy Central. The show debuted on August 14, 2012, and was executive produced by Ross himself. The program featured Ross roasting a wide variety of targets, along with guest appearances by fellow comedians who make up a panel of roasters. The show was renewed for a second season by Comedy Central, which premiered January 8, 2013.

== Format ==
The Burn with Jeff Ross was presented in a humorous half-hour format, and was broadcast Tuesday nights at 10:30 EST (9:30 Central). The show was broken down into many segments. Examples of these segments included celebrity visits, public roasting, and panelist roasting. The first season contained an additional segment, known as "speed roasting", in which members of the audience volunteered to be roasted. As of the second season, the "speed roasting" segment is available only via the Internet.

The show usually featured several segments such as:

- "Friendly Fire": Ross meets up with a celebrity friend of his, usually roasting each other
- "Rapid Fire": Ross makes a quick succession of jokes about a certain topic/celebrity (season 1 only)
- "Public Enemy": Ross, sometimes riding a Segway scooter, goes around to roast regular people out on the street, sometimes following a certain theme, such a meter maids and pornstars
- "Panel": three guest comedians discuss the recent news and pop culture happenings
- "Too Soon?": the last segment of every episode, Ross does a roast/eulogy for somebody that had recently died, whether a celebrity or someone anonymous who died in a humorous or idiotic way

== Episodes ==
=== Season 1 (2012) ===
No. in series	No. in season	Original air date	Public Enemy	Friendly Fire	Guests	Panel Topics	Too Soon?
1	1	August 14, 2012	Meter maids	Sarah Silverman	Amy Schumer, Ralphie May, J. B. Smoove	Oscar Pistorius, United States men's rowing team, Gabby Douglas	Sally Ride
2	2	August 21, 2012	Paparazzi	John Stamos	Gilbert Gottfried, Marc Maron, Russell Peters	Jenna Jameson endorsing Mitt Romney, women-only city in Saudi Arabia, Sherlyn Chopra	Ron Palillo
3	3	August 28, 2012	Bouncers	Jimmy Kimmel	Mary Lynn Rajskub, Jim Norton, Bobby Lee	Fifty Shades of Grey, Facebook stocks, Ronda Rousey	Tony Scott
4	4	September 4, 2012	Spot snatchers	Nicole Elizabeth "Snooki" Polizzi	Natasha Leggero, Anthony Jeselnik, Todd Glass	Lance Armstrong, Code Pink, Persistent genital arousal disorder	Neil Armstrong
5	5	September 11, 2012	Porn stars	Johnny Knoxville	Hannibal Buress, Rachael Harris, T. J. Miller	Kanye West, Gina Rinehart, The Oogieloves in the Big Balloon Adventure	Michael Clarke Duncan
6	6	September 18, 2012	Flea market vendors	Arianny Celeste, Miguel Torres	Chelsea Peretti, Amy Schumer, Brody Stevens	First vegetarian McDonald's restaurant, Levitated Mass	Man dressed as Bigfoot

=== Season 2 (2013) ===
No. in series	No. in season	Original air date	Public Enemy	Friendly Fire	Guests	Panel Topics	Too Soon?
7	1	January 8, 2013	Westboro Baptist Church		Bobby Lee, Anthony Jeselnik, Lisa Lampanelli	Bulletproof vests for kids, South Korean toilet theme park	Paparazzo struck by car
8	2	January 15, 2013	Highly sensitive people	The ladies of The View (Whoopi Goldberg, Elisabeth Hasselbeck, Joy Behar)	Natasha Leggero, Judah Friedlander, Dave Attell	Academy Award nominations, Gun appreciation day	Stripper who fell over a railing
9	3	January 22, 2013	Smokers	Bob Saget	Margaret Cho, James Adomian, Brian Posehn	Formal Fridays, Manti Te'o, Man who made a gold shirt, Man chastity belt	Man slipped to death while defecating between two subway cars
10	4	January 29, 2013	Teachers	Celebrities at the premiere of Movie 43 (Patrick Warburton, Tom Arnold, Common, Larry David, J. B. Smoove, Gene Simmons, Andy Dick, Seann William Scott)	Aisha Tyler, T. J. Miller, Gilbert Gottfried	Women in combat, Super Bowl XLVII, Wade Davis	Man suffocated by girlfriend's breasts
11	5	February 5, 2013	Black History Month		Michael Ian Black, Sherrod Small, Adam Carolla	Klan Robes in the Classroom, Iran sends monkey into space, My Strange Addiction	Secret service dog falls off 6 story building protecting Joe Biden
12	6	February 12, 2013		Rob Corddry	Nikki Glaser, Al Madrigal, Ralphie May	Shaving Pubes, Enlarging G Spot, In Israel pot improves quality of life	16 yr old dies of dehydration after masturbating 42 times
