= James Donald Forbes McCann =

Australian comedian

James Donald Forbes McCann (born 1991) is an Australian stand-up comedian.

== Biography ==
McCann is Roman Catholic.

McCann is married and has four children, but has stated that he prefers to maintain the privacy of his family life.

== Career ==
=== Comedy ===
McCann is associated with the Adelaide Fringe Festival. In 2018 he won three awards at the Adelaide Comedy Awards. His early shows at Adelaide fringe were titled Wolf Creek: The Musical, and The Sound of Nazis.

In 2018 he performed a show titled McCann-dle in the Wind, at Adelaide Fringe and Sydney Comedy Festival. In 2020 he performed a show at Adelaide Fringe titled Devil's Advocate. In 2021 he performed the show Aussie and Proud at Adelaide Fringe, a one-hour set that riffed on Australiana. The show received a favourable review from a local freelance writer.

In 2023 he opened for Mark Normand for some of the nights of Normand's Fanny Guy tour.

In 2024 he appeared on multiple episodes of Kill Tony.

On 2 September 2025, a comedy special titled 'BLACK ISRAELITE' was uploaded to his Youtube channel where it received more than 1.5 million views and 65 thousand likes.

In 2026, McCann booked a comedy tour of his home nation of Australia.

=== Podcast ===
McCann uploaded the first episode of his podcast, 'The James Donald Forbes McCann Catamaran Plan', on 12 December 2021. The podcast remains ongoing. It has been recorded in-studio, and in various outdoor locations. His podcasts feature guests on an infrequent basis; some organised beforehand, and others as a spontaneous result of the podcast filming locations.

=== Music ===
On 19 December 2022, a video titled 'Full Christmas Special' was uploaded to James' Youtube channel, wherein he performed covers of popular Christmas carols, spoken word arrangements, and improvised entirely original music compositions.

In 2024, McCann released an album titled 'Sometimes I Wish We Were a Catamaran' on Spotify. He has also released numerous singles.

On 25 February 2026, a video titled 'organhour' was uploaded to James' Youtube channel. The video, which lasts for 1 hour and 49 seconds, features a bespectacled McCann performing a marathon of improvised music demonstration and sequencing. The instrument being played is a synthesiser organ with various beat and keytone modulation features, and what appears to be humble, yet respectable wood panelling. The organ is a Yamaha.

=== Poetry ===
McCann has published four books of poetry; three of which were best sellers in the Australian Poetry category:

- Marlon Brando 9/11: Beautiful Poems that Everybody will Love, published in 2022;
- My Monkey and I Have Something to Hide: Unpleasant Poems with Limited Appeal, published in 2023;
- Splish Splash, published in 2024; and
- Disquieting Levels of Egg, published in 2025.

The books are currently being sold via the Amazon e-commerce platform.

== See also ==
- Comedy in Australia
