= Isabel Hagen =

American comedian and violist

- Born: New York City, New York
- Education: Juilliard School

Comedy career
- Years active: 2015-present
- Medium: Stand-up
- Website: https://www.isabelhagen.com

Isabel Hagen is an American violist, comedian, and filmmaker.

== Early life and education ==
Isabel Hagen was born in New York City, New York, and grew up in Manhattan. She started playing the violin at age 5 and switched to the viola at age 10. At age 12 she joined the pre-college program at the Juilliard School where she studied with Kenji Bunch for six years. She studied at the Juilliard School, earning a bachelor's degree in 2013 and a master's degree in 2015 in viola performance.

== Music ==
Hagen has toured internationally with the American Contemporary Music Ensemble (ACME), Alarm Will Sound, and Ensemble Signal. As a pit musician she performed in several Broadway productions including Les Miserables, Fiddler on the Roof, The Lion King, and Rocktopia. She has worked with artists including Björk, Max Richter, The National, Steve Reich, and Vampire Weekend, whose touring band she joined in 2025. In June 2022, Hagen was featured at the 2022 American Viola Society Festival & 47th International Viola Congress.

== Comedy ==
During her sophomore year, Hagen made a YouTube video How to Convince People You're Really Good at Chamber Music inspired by Jenna Marbles' How to Trick People into Thinking You're Good Looking. The positive responses among conservatory students gave her the confidence to pursue comedy. While getting her master's degree, Hagen started participating in open mic nights when she developed repetitive stress syndrome and could not practice for a couple of months. She pursued stand-up comedy while working as a freelance violist. After four years she started integrating her viola into her work as a comedian. Hagen won first place in The Bell House in Brooklyn's 2019 One Liner Madness competition. In July 2019 Hagen was one of the New Faces of Comedy at the Just for Laughs comedy festival in Montreal.

She became known to a larger audience on March 11, 2020, when she appeared on The Tonight Show Starring Jimmy Fallon. She made a second appearance on the show on October 26, 2022, including her viola in her performance. Hagen has also appeared on the show with musical guests on multiple occasions.

In 2024, Hagen wrote that in the age of social media, comedians are forced to spend a great deal of time on self-promotion, whether through posting 'bikini photos', sparking fights with others, or showing their work in bite-sized video clips.

== Film ==
In 2020, Hagen starred in the web series Is A Violist, which she also wrote and directed. Her feature film debut On a String, which she also wrote, directed, and starred in, premiered at the Tribeca Festival on June 5, 2025, where it won Best Screenplay in a U.S. Narrative Feature. The film later screened at festivals including the Tallinn Black Nights Film Festival, Calgary International Film Festival, New Hampshire Film Festival, and Naples International Film Festival (where it won both Best Narrative Feature and the Focus on the Arts Award). The film was acquired by Joke Zero.

== Podcast ==
From 2020 to 2021, Hagen hosted the podcast Good Timing with Isabel Hagen in which she talked with other artists about the creative process and performance anxiety. Guests included Eric Bogosian, Maria Bamford, Andy Kindler, and David Corenswet.
