= Tony Hinchcliffe =

American comedian and podcaster (born 1984)

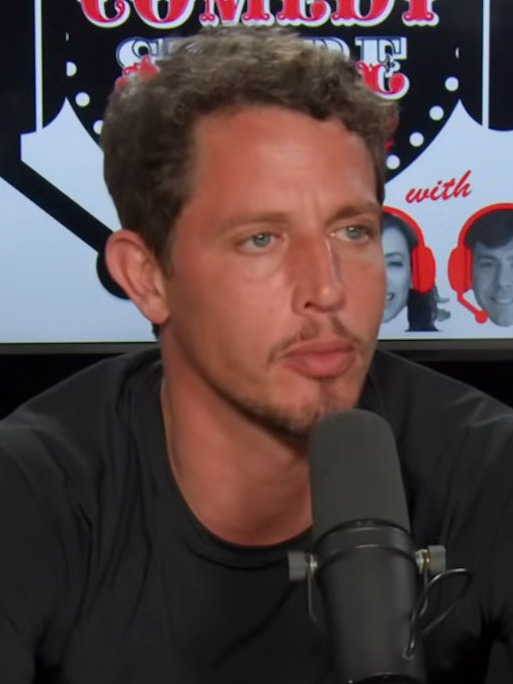
- Hinchcliffe in 2024
- Born: June 8, 1984 (age 42); Youngstown, Ohio, U.S.
- Notable work: Kill Tony, Comedy Central Roast, One Shot

Comedy career
- Years active: 2007–present
- Medium: Comedy, television, webcast
- Genres: Comedy roasts, insult comedy, observational comedy, blue comedy, crowd work
- Subjects: Everyday life, current events, politics, self-deprecation, race
- Website: tonyhinchcliffe.com

Tony Hinchcliffe (born June 8, 1984) is an American comedian and podcaster. Since 2013, he has hosted the live stand-up comedy podcast Kill Tony alongside co-host Brian Redban, a showcase of professional and amateur comedians who take turns doing one-minute sets. Hinchcliffe is known primarily for roast comedy, having been on the writing staff of the Comedy Central Roast series, and appearing at the All Def Digital Roast of Snoop Dogg in 2016, The Roast of Tom Brady in 2024 and The Roast of Kevin Hart in 2026. He has released three comedy specials, One Shot on Netflix in 2016, Making Friends on YouTube in 2020, and Man of The People on Netflix in 2026.

Hinchcliffe has a reputation for dark humor which, combined with his insult-based roast comedy, has led to several controversies. In 2021, he was dropped by his agency and lost multiple endorsements after using an anti-Asian slur against an opening Chinese American comedian during his set. In October 2024, the Donald Trump campaign invited him to perform a set at a rally at Madison Square Garden, during which he made a widely criticized joke about Puerto Rico. In 2026, during Netflix's The Roast of Kevin Hart, Hinchcliffe made several jokes referring to the murder of George Floyd, slavery, and the suicide of comedian Sheryl Underwood's husband, sparking widespread criticism.

== Early life ==
Born in Youngstown, Ohio, on June 8, 1984, Hinchcliffe was raised by his single mother in the city's north side. He attended Ursuline High School, where he was on the wrestling team, graduating in 2003. He is of Italian descent.

Hinchcliffe told the Free Times of Columbia, South Carolina, that he grew up in a tough neighborhood and that he first developed roasting as a defense mechanism. In an interview with Cleveland.com, he said that his insults also got him punched in the face on the school bus on his first day of school. On Ryan Sickler's HoneyDew podcast, Hinchcliffe revealed that his father was married to a woman other than his mother and that his birth was kept secret from her. At the same time, he was unaware of his father's other family until adolescence, thinking instead that his father just travelled a lot for work.

== Career and controversies ==
In 2007, Hinchcliffe moved to Los Angeles to pursue a career in comedy. He started performing stand-up at open mics at The Comedy Store in West Hollywood, California. He was hired to work the phones and the cover booth, eventually becoming a paid regular at the venue. He also started opening for comedians Joe Rogan and Jeff Ross on tour.

Hinchcliffe became known at The Comedy Store for insulting other comics and audience members during shows. He is also known for broaching uncomfortable and sensitive topics during his stand-up sets. Hinchcliffe's style of roasting and dark sense of humor appealed to fellow comedian Jeff Ross, known as the "Roastmaster General" of the television series Comedy Central Roast. Hinchcliffe refers to Ross as his mentor and he helped get Hinchcliffe his first writing jobs.

Hinchcliffe has written for the Comedy Central Roast episodes featuring James Franco, Justin Bieber and Rob Lowe. His contributions to the series include writing Martha Stewart's set for the Justin Bieber roast and Ann Coulter's set for the Rob Lowe roast. He has also written for the comedy panel show The Burn with Jeff Ross and appeared as a contestant on the first season of Jeff Ross Presents Roast Battle.

He also appeared as a roaster on the All Def Digital Roast of Snoop Dogg in 2016 and The Roast of Tom Brady in 2024.

Hinchcliffe's first one-hour stand-up special titled One Shot premiered on Netflix in 2016. His special was so named because it was shot in one camera take with no edits. In 2017, he headlined the Monster Energy Outbreak Tour where he toured 20 American cities in 22 days.

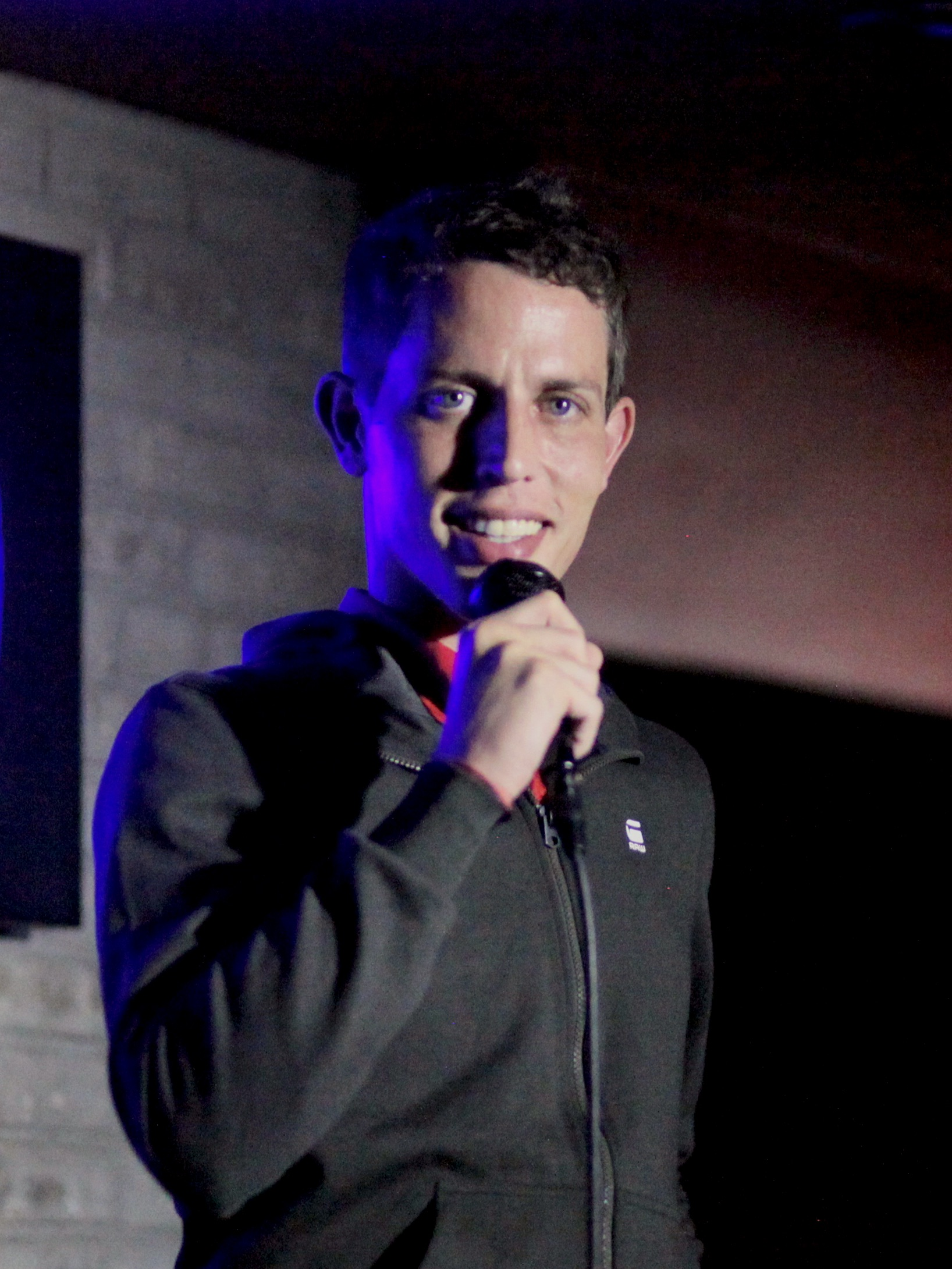
Hinchcliffe in 2017

=== Kill Tony ===
Since 2013, Hinchcliffe has produced and hosted a podcast called Kill Tony, a weekly live show recorded at The Comedy Store. During the show, Hinchcliffe and co-host Brian Redban (of the Deathsquad Network and formerly of The Joe Rogan Experience), along with a changing panel of comedians and other celebrities, act as judges for amateur comedians. The contestants enter their names into a bucket and are selected at random throughout the show. Each selected contestant gets to perform a one-minute comedy set, followed by a discussion and critique by the panel of judges. The show aims to give young comedians a chance to showcase their talent and build their professional reputation. It sets no limits on topics the contestants can present, allowing for potentially offensive or politically incorrect performances.

In September 2020, Hinchcliffe announced that he would relocate to Austin, Texas, to join Joe Rogan and Brian Redban. The Kill Tony podcast relocated to Antone's Nightclub in downtown Austin. The show relocated to Vulcan Gas Company on 6th Street in May 2021, but is now hosted at Joe Rogan's Austin-based comedy club Comedy Mothership. On New Year's Eve 2023, Kill Tony hosted its first live arena show at the H-E-B Center at Cedar Park.

=== 2021 Austin stand-up performance ===
During a stand-up set in May 2021, Hinchcliffe was videotaped insulting Peng Dang, an Asian American comedian who had introduced Hinchcliffe after performing the previous set at Vulcan Gas Company in Austin. Hinchcliffe said Dang was a "filthy little fucking chink", followed with a series of Asian stereotypes in a mock Chinese accent, and lashed out at audience members who laughed at Dang's jokes, branding them as "race traitors". The video was later shown on Twitter, went viral and received criticism. As a result, Hinchcliffe was dropped by his agency WME. The Austin nightclub Antone's announced that it would no longer be involved with Hinchcliffe or his Kill Tony live show. The interruption was extremely brief: Kill Tony resumed its Monday-night run at a new Austin venue, Vulcan Gas Company, on May 31, 2021. In 2023, Rogan made Kill Tony one of the recurring flagship shows of his own newly opened club, where it remained on schedule every monday since.

Vulture reported that during his set, Hinchcliffe stated that Chinese people came to Austin because of the bats (referring to a proposed origin of COVID-19) and criticized offended audience members for "believing he was serious". In an interview with Variety, Hinchcliffe stated that the line was a joke and he did nothing wrong, adding that he believed comedians should never apologize for a joke and simply continue with their work.

=== 2024 Donald Trump rally ===
On October 27, 2024, Hinchcliffe performed at a Donald Trump campaign rally in Madison Square Garden. During his set, he described Puerto Rico as a "floating island of garbage", and joked that "these Latinos, they love making babies, they do. There's no pulling out. They don't do that, they come inside, just like they do to our country". His act employed several ethnic stereotypes, including joking about carving watermelons with Black people and making a rock paper scissors joke involving Palestinians throwing rocks, and Jews "[having] a hard time throwing that paper", connoting economic antisemitism.

Hinchcliffe's remarks were widely criticized as racist, including by prominent politicians such as Democratic vice presidential nominee Tim Walz, who called him a "jackwad" on a livestream with Representative Alexandria Ocasio-Cortez, who is of Puerto Rican ancestry. Representative Ritchie Torres, also of Puerto Rican ancestry, said that he was "tempted to call Hinchcliffe racist garbage but doing so would be an insult to garbage". The Trump campaign distanced itself from Hinchcliffe's Puerto Rico comments. It is unclear if the Hinchcliffe joke hurt the Trump campaign. The joke may have helped the Trump campaign as reported by NPR. "Puerto Rican community leaders tell WLRN one reason may be that Puerto Ricans living here in the U.S. mainland hold a negative view of the chronic government corruption and dysfunction back on the U.S. island territory."

=== 2026 The Roast of Kevin Hart ===
In 2026, Hinchcliffe participated in the celebrity roast of actor and comedian Kevin Hart. During the live-streamed roast, several comedians, including Hinchcliffe and Shane Gillis, performed jokes involving racial stereotypes. Hinchcliffe's set included a joke about George Floyd, an unarmed Black man who was murdered by former Minneapolis police officer Derek Chauvin, who knelt on Floyd's neck for more than nine minutes despite Floyd's repeated pleas that he could not breathe. Hinchcliffe additionally made jokes referring to slavery, and jokes about the death of comedian Sheryl Underwood's late husband, who died by suicide in 2011.

Critics of the roast, including members of Floyd's family and representatives of the George Floyd Foundation, condemned Hinchcliffe's remarks, calling them insensitive and "sad."

== Comedy specials ==
Year	Title	Distributor
2016	One Shot	Netflix
2020	Making Friends	YouTube
2025	Kill or Be Killed	Netflix
2026	Man of the People	Netflix
