= Anthony Hashem =

American filmmaker

- Born: Jacksonville, Florida
- Citizenship: USA
- Occupation: Filmmaker
- Years active: 2012- Present
- Known for: "Mile High- The Comeback of Cannabis"

Anthony Hashem is an American filmmaker from Jacksonville, Florida, who first made national and international headlines as the director and co-writer of the film "Mile High- The Comeback of Cannabis", a comedy documentary on the historic Colorado vote to legalize adult use marijuana. Hashem debuted his film at the historic Mayan Theater in Denver where free cannabis was legally given to all attendees over 21 at the premiere per the new law documented in the film.
