= Raanan Hershberg =

American comedian (born 1984)

- Born: June 3, 1984 (age 42); Louisville, Kentucky
- Spouse: Cate Weinberg

Comedy career
- Years active: 2009–present
- Medium: Stand-up; YouTube
- Genres: Observational comedy; satire; self-deprecation
- Website: raananhershberg.com

Raanan Hershberg is an American comedian and filmmaker.

== Career ==
=== Comedy ===
Based in New York, Hershberg was raised as a Conservative Jew in Kentucky. He began as a struggling screenwriter in New York and as a substitute teacher in Kentucky. His career then took off when he performed at Louisville's Caravan Comedy Club. He has performed on The Tonight Show Starring Jimmy Fallon, The Late Late Show with James Corden, and After Midnight.

He is a regular performer at The Comedy Cellar in Manhattan, and is known for his loud, high-energy, and dry wit mannerisms.

In January 2026, his special Morbidly Jewish: A New Special was released. His specials prior to this were Brave, which was released in February 2025 and satirized the political divide in the U.S., Jokes from the Underground (filmed at New York's Comedy Cellar), and It Could Have Been Better (which was available for streaming on Amazon).

=== Film ===
He co-directed the 2025 psychological thriller short film Memory Room with Dan McCabe, which won Best Film at the New York Shorts Film Festival. He runs a podcast with fellow comedian Joe List, where they critique various films.

== Personal life ==
He is married to Cate Weinberg and has a daughter.
