= Zoltan Kaszas =

Hungarian-American stand-up comedian

- Kaszás Zoltán
- Born: Budapest, Hungary

Comedy career
- Years active: 2006–present
- Medium: Stand-up
- Genres: Observational comedy; Autobiographical comedy
- Website: zoltancomedy.com

Zoltan Kaszas (Hungarian: Kaszás Zoltán) is a Hungarian-American stand-up comedian. Born in Budapest, he emigrated to the United States as a child and grew up primarily in the San Diego area. He began performing stand-up in 2006 and won the Seattle International Comedy Competition in 2013.

Kaszas gained wider attention in 2017 after a clip from his Dry Bar Comedy special Cat Jokes, comparing cat and dog owners, became widely shared online. He has since released several stand-up specials independently, including Modern Male (2020), White Lies (2022), Honorary Jones (2024) and London Fog (2025), and has toured internationally.

== Early life ==
Kaszas was born in Budapest, Hungary. He moved to the United States with his mother in 1991, first living in Pittsburgh, Pennsylvania, before the family relocated to the San Diego area.

Kaszas has described being raised by his mother, who initially spoke little English after arriving in the United States. In Pittsburgh she worked as a live-in housekeeper for a family who had helped sponsor their move to the country.

After several years in Pittsburgh, Kaszas and his mother moved to Southern California, where they lived in a trailer park in the San Diego area.

== Career ==
=== Early career and competitions ===
Kaszas performed his first open-mic set in 2006, when he was 19. He initially intended comedy to occupy his time while preparing for shoulder surgery, but after his first performances he continued pursuing stand-up instead.

During his early career, he performed extensively in the Southern California comedy scene and entered several comedy competitions. He won the San Diego Comedy Festival, the San Diego's Funniest Person contest and the Rockstar Energy Drink Comedy Throwdown.

In 2013, Kaszas won the 34th annual Seattle International Comedy Competition, a month-long competition featuring stand-up comedians performing at venues across Washington state.

=== Breakthrough with Cat Jokes ===
Kaszas' wider breakthrough came in 2017 through a Dry Bar Comedy set later known as Cat Jokes. A clip in which he compared cat owners with dog owners became viral on Facebook, reaching nearly 15 million views by December of that year.

The popularity of the clip led to wider exposure and an audition for America's Got Talent. The routine continued to circulate in subsequent years and became closely associated with Kaszas' public profile. In 2023, comedian He Huang selected the clip for a Guardian feature on her ten favourite comedy videos online.

Also in 2017, Kaszas recorded the comedy album Uncle McFatFat in San Diego and performed a month-long run of his show American Immigrant at the Edinburgh Festival Fringe.

=== Comedy specials and touring ===
Kaszas subsequently released several full-length stand-up specials, increasingly distributing them independently online. Modern Male was released in 2020 and focused on masculinity, relationships and everyday social expectations.

He followed it with White Lies in 2022. Filmed in Escondido, California, the special includes material about the COVID-19 pandemic, therapy, ageing and fatherhood.

In 2024, Kaszas released Honorary Jones, an independently produced special dealing with marriage, moving to New York, health and his relationships with father figures.

His 2025 special London Fog was filmed in Seattle and released on YouTube in November 2025. Its material includes anxiety, parenthood, his upbringing with a single immigrant mother and the effects of increasing career success.

By 2026, Kaszas was touring internationally. His Worldwide(ish) Tour included performances across Europe and marked his first professional performances in Budapest since leaving Hungary as a child.

== Comedy style ==
Kaszas' comedy is primarily observational and autobiographical, frequently drawing on relationships, pets, immigration, family life and his Hungarian-American upbringing.

His delivery often combines tightly written material with expressive physical reactions. Seattle International Comedy Competition organiser Peter Greyy described him after his 2013 victory as a comedian who combined carefully constructed writing with highly expressive performance.

Kaszas has also frequently used his experiences as an immigrant and the son of a single Hungarian mother as stand-up material. His 2017 Edinburgh show American Immigrant centred partly on growing up with a mother shaped by Communist-era Hungary, while later specials continued to draw on his family background.

== Stand-up releases ==
Year	Title	Format	Notes
2017	Cat Jokes	Streaming special	Dry Bar Comedy
2017	Uncle McFatFat	Comedy album	Recorded in San Diego
2018	Ten Thousand Pesos	Comedy album	
2020	Modern Male	Stand-up special	Released online
2021	Average Intelligence	Stand-up special / album	Dry Bar Comedy
2022	White Lies	Stand-up special	Independently released on YouTube
2024	Honorary Jones	Stand-up special	Independently released on YouTube
2025	London Fog	Stand-up special	Independently released on YouTube
