= Tom Segura =

American comedian (born 1979)

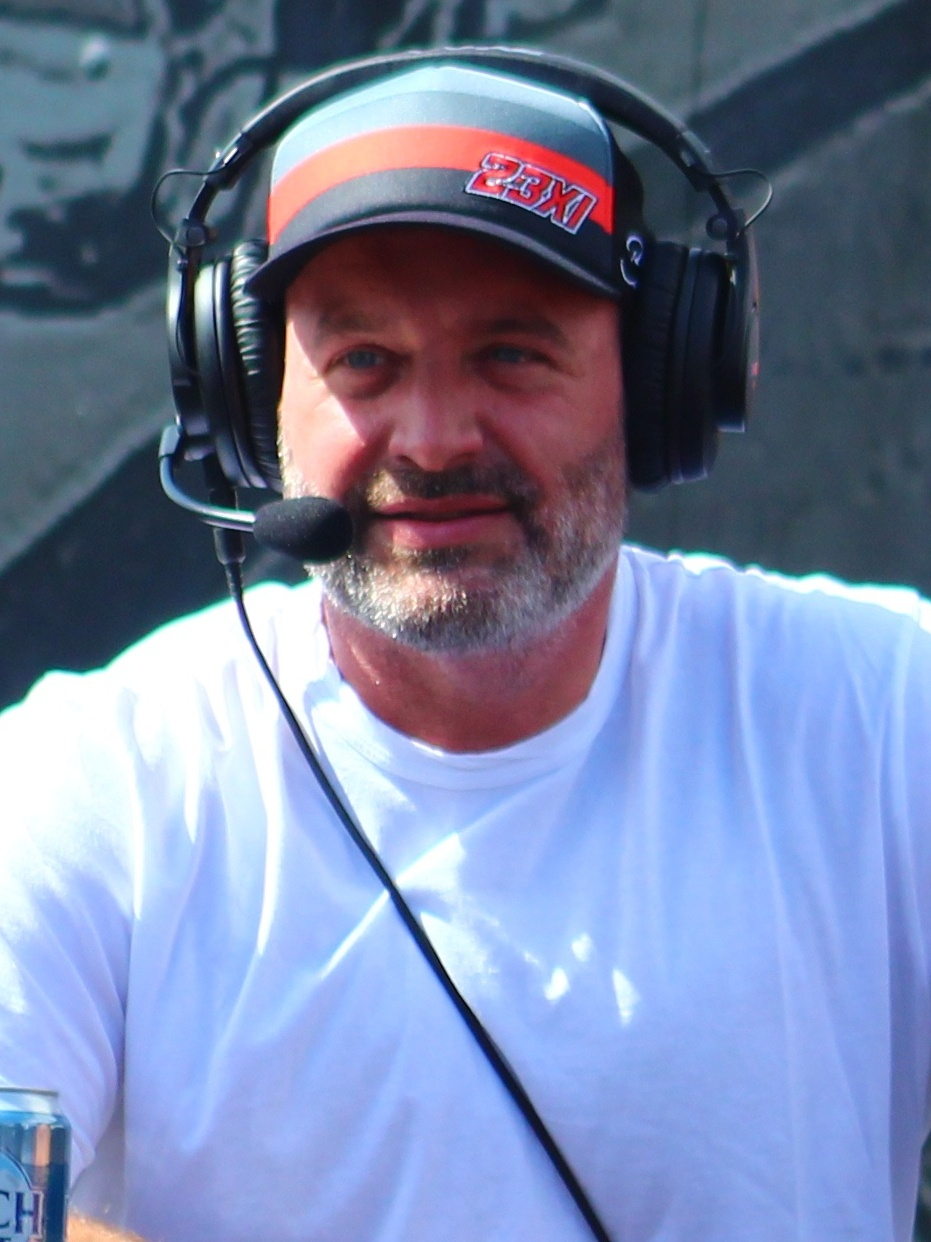
- Segura at Daytona International Speedway in 2023
- Born: Thomas Weston Segura; April 16, 1979 (age 47); Cincinnati, Ohio, U.S.
- Spouse: Christina Pazsitzky (m. 2008; sep. 2026)
- Children: 2

Comedy career
- Years active: 2001–present
- Medium: Stand-up, film, television, podcasting
- Genres: Observational comedy, black comedy, sarcasm, insult comedy, deadpan
- Website: tomsegura.com

Thomas Weston Segura (born April 16, 1979) is an American stand-up comedian, writer, author, actor, and podcaster. He co-hosts the Your Mom's House podcast with his former wife and fellow comedian Christina Pazsitzky. Segura also co-hosts the podcast Two Bears One Cave with friend and fellow comedian Bert Kreischer.

== Early life ==
Segura was born on April 16, 1979, in Cincinnati, Ohio, to Rosario "Charo" Lazarte, a Peruvian immigrant, and Thomas Nadeau Segura. His father was a wealth manager and vice president at Merrill Lynch.

Tom grew up speaking Spanish and spent his summers in Lima, Peru. He graduated from Saint Edward's School in Vero Beach, Florida, and from Lenoir-Rhyne University in Hickory, North Carolina. At age 19, he overdosed on a mixture of drugs that he was told was GHB and fell into a short coma.

== Career ==
Segura began stand-up comedy shortly after graduating from Lenoir-Rhyne University. On episode 568 of Your Mom's House, he mentioned he was doing comedy in the evenings for the first few years while holding down other daytime jobs. Segura has described interning at Kopelson Entertainment and then having his first paid job in the industry as a logger, producing transcripts of reality shows such as Extreme Makeover and My Big Fat Obnoxious Boss.

Segura has performed at the Melbourne International Comedy Festival, The Comedy Festival, the Global Comedy Festival in Vancouver, and Just For Laughs Comedy Festival. Segura was also a San Francisco regional finalist on Last Comic Standing 2. Segura has been a frequent guest on The Joe Rogan Experience. His first appearance was on episode 8.

In 2018, Segura and Pazsitzky landed a TV deal with CBS, who gave a pilot production commitment for their show The Little Things. Segura's fourth special for Netflix, Ball Hog, premiered on March 24, 2020, and a Spanish-language special was planned for the fall of 2020, before the advent of the COVID-19 pandemic. Segura's fifth Netflix comedy special, Sledgehammer, premiered on July 4, 2023.

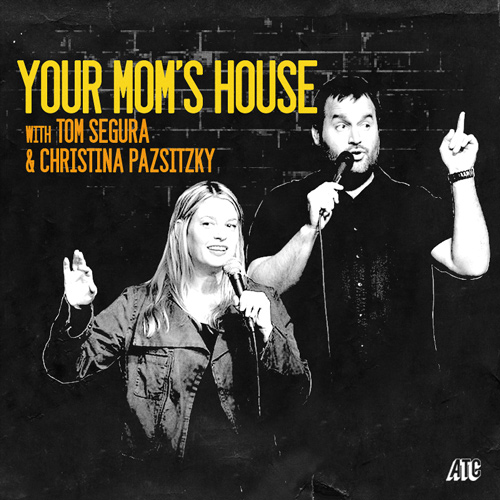
Your Mom's House iTunes artwork

In 2010, Segura and Pazsitzky started the podcast Your Mom's House, which they both host.

Segura released a book in 2022 titled I'd Like to Play Alone, Please, a collection of humorous essays. He said about the book: "This is not a memoir, this is not an autobiography. It's a collection of stories, which is an extension of what I do as a comedian, which is I tell stories, a lot."

He wrote, directed, produced and has a lead role in his 2025 comedy series Bad Thoughts for Netflix. Bad Thoughts was nominated for two 2026 Emmy Awards, for Outstanding Short Form Comedy, Drama or Variety Series, and for Outstanding Performer in a Short Form Comedy or Drama Series.

Segura participated in Saudi Arabia's 2025 Riyadh Comedy Festival, an event characterized by Human Rights Watch as an effort by the Saudi government to whitewash its human rights abuses.

== Personal life ==
Segura was born in Cincinnati, Ohio, and has lived in Minneapolis, Minnesota; Mequon, Wisconsin; Vero Beach, Florida; and Los Angeles, California. He has two sisters named Jane and Maria and is related (as third cousins) to the neurobiologist and podcast host Andrew Huberman.

Segura and his wife of 18 years, comedian Christina Pazsitzky, separated in July 2026. They have two sons together.

== Stand-up comedy ==
=== Albums ===
Year	Title	Notes	Ref.
2010	Thrilled	Hour-long stand-up album	
2012	White Girls With Cornrows	Hour-long stand-up album	

=== Specials ===
Year	Title	Notes	Ref.
2014	Completely Normal	Netflix stand-up comedy special	
2016	Mostly Stories	Netflix stand-up comedy special	
2018	Disgraceful	Netflix stand-up comedy special	
2020	Ball Hog	Netflix stand-up comedy special	
2023	Sledgehammer	Netflix stand-up comedy special	
2025	Teacher	Netflix stand-up comedy special	

=== TV appearances ===
Year	Title	References
2007	Live at Gotham	
2011	Comedy Central Presents	
2013	This Is Not Happening	

== Bibliography ==
Year	Title
2022	I'd Like to Play Alone, Please

== Filmography ==
=== Film ===
Year	Title	Role	Notes	Ref.
2010	Frank Advice	Dan Pena	Co-writer	
2013	9 Inches	Dan	Co-writer and director	
2016	The People's Mayor	Harry Pryor	Pilot	
2017	I Need You To Kill	Himself		
2018	Instant Family	Russ		
2019	Countdown	Derek King		
2020	The Opening Act	Cop		
