= Kill Tony =

Stand-up comedy variety show

- Genre: Stand-up comedy Variety show
- Created by: Tony Hinchcliffe
- Starring: Tony Hinchcliffe; Brian Redban
- Country of origin: United States
- Original language: English
- No. of episodes: 793

Original release
- Release: June 3, 2013 – present

Kill Tony is an American live podcast stand-up comedy variety show created and hosted by Tony Hinchcliffe and produced and co-hosted by Brian Redban. The show premiered on June 3, 2013, and has released a new episode every Monday night since. It streams on YouTube and other online platforms, achieving around 3 million downloads per episode. The show is ranked the 19th most popular podcast on Spotify as of November 2, 2024. As of October 29, 2024, it held 13th position on Apple's comedy podcast chart.

In each episode, Tony Hinchcliffe and Brian Redban, usually joined by a celebrity guest host or hosts, randomly draw names from a bucket of aspiring stand-up comedians who are given the opportunity to perform a minute of stand-up comedy for the panel and a live audience, followed by an interview. Comedians that perform well can become regulars on the show.

Originally recorded at The Comedy Store in Los Angeles, California, Kill Tony moved to Austin, Texas for its 487th episode, recording at Antone's Nightclub for 18 episodes, Vulcan Gas Company for 92 episodes, and currently records at the Comedy Mothership on Sixth Street. It celebrated its 10-year anniversary as a show in 2023. The 647th and 648th episodes were recorded in front of the show's largest live audiences yet at the H-E-B Center at Cedar Park of Austin, Texas on New Year's Eve, leading into 2024. It recorded its 650th episode on January 22, 2024. For 2024, Kill Tony announced shows at Madison Square Garden and the LA Forum. The show has also recorded shows in cities including Brisbane, Calgary, Chicago, Dallas, London, Manchester, Nashville, New York, Philadelphia, Phoenix, San Diego, San Francisco, Seattle, Sydney, Toronto, Vancouver, and Washington, D.C. In 2024, Kill Tony signed with Studio71 for distribution, ad sales, and marketing. Netflix Is a Joke Fest 2024 featured a Kill Tony show.
