= Matteo Lane =

American comedian (born 1986)

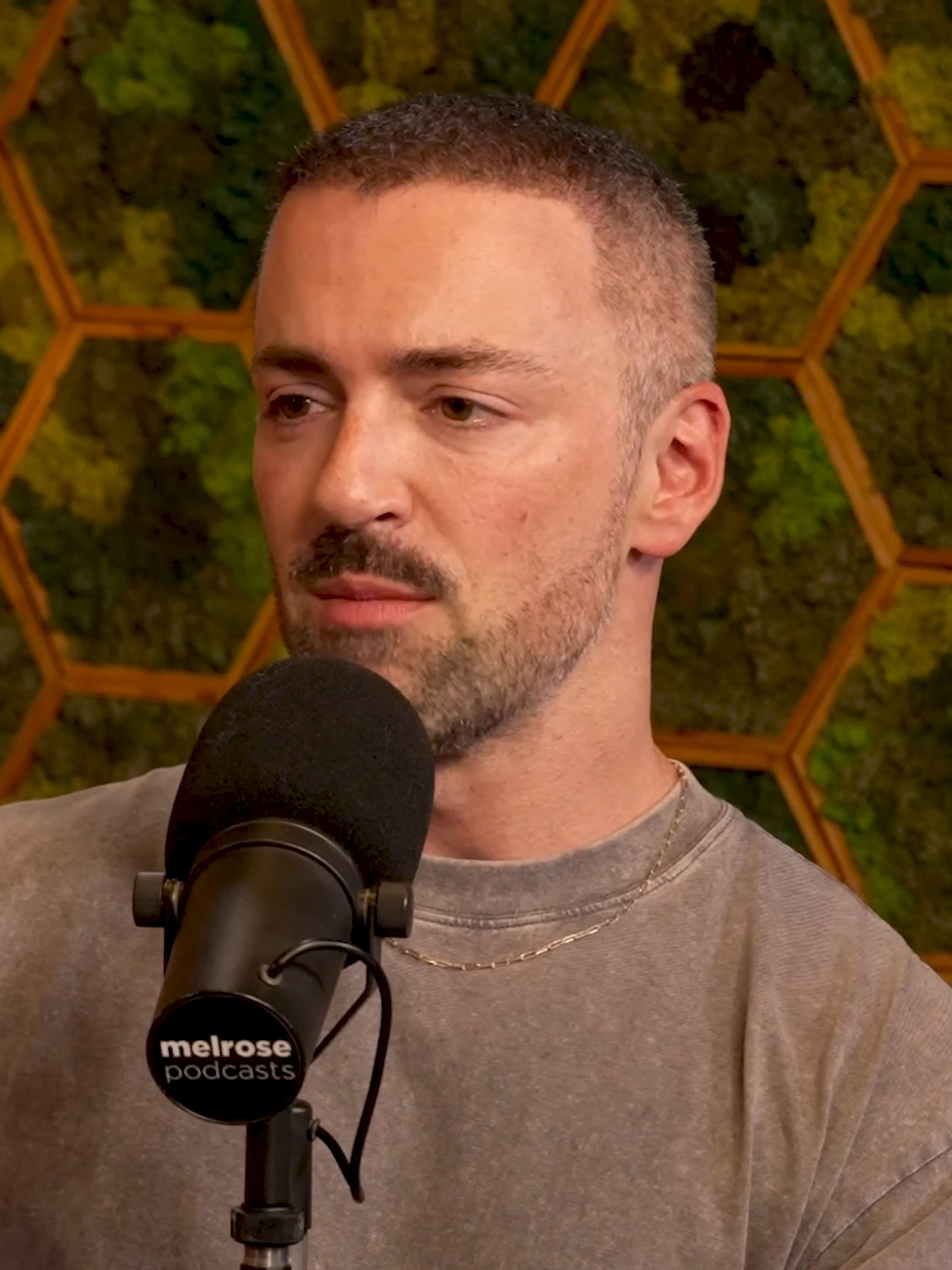
- Lane in 2024
- Born: Matthew Lane; June 28, 1986 (age 40); Des Plaines, Illinois, U.S.
- Education: School of the Art Institute of Chicago (BFA)
- Spouse: Rodrigo Aburto (m. 2023, divorced) (Note: In August 2026, Lane publicly announced that he and Aburto had divorced, but he did not specify when.)

Comedy career
- Years active: 2011–present
- Medium: Stand-up; television; film; music
- Genres: Observational comedy; blue comedy; musical comedy; insult comedy; sarcasm; satire
- Subjects: American culture; LGBT culture; everyday life; human sexuality; pop culture; current events; gender differences; self-deprecation
- Website: matteolanecomedy.com

Matthew "Matteo" Lane (born June 28, 1986) is an American comedian, actor, singer, and illustrator. He has made appearances on The Late Show with Stephen Colbert, Late Night with Seth Meyers, and HBO's Crashing. He played Billy Flynn in the Broadway musical Chicago. Lane was recognized by The Advocate as one of the "LGBT Icons, Innovators, and Disruptors" for his stand-up comedy.

== Early life and education ==
Matthew Lane was born on June 28, 1986 in Des Plaines, Illinois. He was raised in Arlington Heights, and lived on the North Side of Chicago. Through his mother, Lane is of Mexican and Italian descent, with the Italian side originating from Agrigento and Messina, Sicily. His father is a Vietnam War veteran and is of Irish descent. He was nicknamed Matteo, the Italian equivalent of Matthew, by his Italian family. Lane, who is gay, has an older brother who is also gay. He speaks English, Italian, Spanish, and French, and studied German in high school.

Lane started to sing opera at the age of 15 under vocal coach Nick Falco. At the School of the Art Institute of Chicago, he studied oil painting and drawing. Lane studied art for five months in Umbria as an oil painter and opera singer before returning to Chicago. He graduated with a Bachelor of Fine Arts in 2009.

== Career ==
As a singer, Lane performed in bars in Boystown before starting his comedy career in 2011 at open mics in Chicago. In 2012, he moved to New York to work as a storyboard artist. In an interview, Lane stated that it was "the most boring job in the world" and he eventually quit to pursue comedy.

After being featured in "New Faces" at the 2014 Just for Laughs festival, MTV invited Lane to appear on Guy Code. He was a commentator on Girl Code from 2015 to 2018. He was later in Joking Off and was cast in MTV's Ladylike along with Nicole Byer, Jade Catta-Preta, and Blair Socci. Lane was on a panel for a segment about Kim Davis on The Nightly Show with Larry Wilmore. In 2018, Lane represented Italy at "The Ethnic Show" at the Just for Laughs festival in Montreal. He was the host of the Snapchat comedy Ghost Hunt. He is a co-star and creator of the IFC series Janice and Jeffrey. Lane and Emma Willmann were co-hosts of a queer-themed podcast, Inside the Closet which ended in February 2023. They are both also featured in Netflix's The Comedy Lineup. On May 1, 2018, Lane and Nico Tortorella were featured on a Nancy podcast.

In 2025, Lane released a cookbook entitled Your Pasta Sucks: A "Cookbook". The book contains a mix of recipes and family stories. In the same year, he released an hour-long special titled The Al Dente Special on Hulu, making it his first special for a major service. Lane performed at Radio City Music Hall that same year, selling out the venue.

In June 2026, Lane made his Broadway debut as Billy Flynn in Chicago.

== Influences ==
Lane has said his biggest influence in comedy is Joan Rivers. He said about her, "I didn't realize you could use comedy as kind of a weapon. It was so empowering to watch her on stage." He also said Ellen DeGeneres and Kathy Griffin were his influences. Lane's favorite singers are Mariah Carey, Patti LaBelle, Whitney Houston, Celine Dion, and Jennifer Hudson.

== Personal life ==
On coming out, Lane stated in an interview, "I've spent my entire life feeling shame for being gay and once I came out of the closet, I realized that I'm proud to be gay." Lane has been the victim of several homophobic incidents during his shows. On being an openly gay comedian, he reports, "I think it's slowly getting better but it's all such new territory in so many ways. I'm not saying they are not gay comics that have existed — I know these people exist." He added that "I'm just saying this is the first time ever that gay, queer, male comedians are sort of on the spotlight that straight comedians are being seen in. So it's all kind of just new. It's all new and discovered and all new territory. I think it's exciting."

In a 2017 interview, Lane stated that while he does not discuss Donald Trump (serving at the time as U.S. President) directly in his act, his "material in itself is a stand against Trump".

On August 19, 2023, Lane announced via Instagram that he and partner Rodrigo Aburto were married. On June 18, 2026, during an episode of his podcast I Never Liked You, Lane announced that he and Aburto had broken up. In a YouTube video from August 16, 2026, Lane noted that he and Aburto had divorced, but did not specify when.

== Filmography ==
=== Film ===
Year	Title	Role	Notes
2015	Moving On	Guy	Short film
2023	Molli and Max in the Future	Bryan Oceancolgate	
2024	Upgraded	Sovereign Air Lounge Escort	
2025	Maintenance Required	Jordan	

=== Television ===
Year	Title	Role	Notes
2015-2018	Girl Code	Himself	
2015	Clipped	Dominic	Episode: "World's Rudest Barbershop"
2018	Crashing	Himself	Episode: "Roast Battle"
2018	The Comedy Lineup	Himself	Episode: "Matteo Lane"
2020	Magical Girl Friendship Squad	Corvin (voice)	6 episodes
2022	Matteo Lane: The Advice Special	Himself	Stand-up special
2023	Matteo Lane: Hair Plugs & Heartache	Himself	Stand-up special
2023	Survival of the Thickest	Waiter	Episode: "You Did What in Public, Bitch?"
2023	Matteo Lane: The Advice Special Part Two	Himself	Stand-up special
2024	Matteo Lane: The Advice Special Part Three	Himself	Stand-up special
2025	Abbott Elementary	Wyatt	Episode: "Karaoke"
2025	Matteo Lane: The Al Dente Special	Himself	Stand-up special

== Discography ==
Podcasts

- Inside The Closet with Emma Willmann (2017–2023)
- I Never Liked You with Nick Smith (2023–present)
- Teach Me Daddy with Chris Distefano (2024)

== See also ==
- LGBT culture in New York City
- List of LGBT people from New York City
