= List of Netflix original stand-up comedy specials =

Netflix is an American global on-demand Internet streaming media provider, that has distributed a number of original programs, including original series, specials, miniseries, documentaries and films.

== Specials ==
Title	Release date	Runtime	Language
Aziz Ansari: Buried Alive	November 1, 2013	1 h 19 min	English
Iliza Shlesinger: Freezing Hot	January 23, 2015	1 h 11 min	English
Ralphie May: Unruly	February 27, 2015	1 h 23 min	English
Aziz Ansari: Live at Madison Square Garden	March 6, 2015	58 min	English
Chris D'Elia: Incorrigible	April 17, 2015	1 h 23 min	English
Jen Kirkman: I'm Gonna Die Alone (And I Feel Fine)	May 22, 2015	1 h 18 min	English
Chris Tucker: Live	July 10, 2015	1 h 32 min	English
Demetri Martin: Live (At the Time)	August 14, 2015	1 h 1 min	English
Anjelah Johnson: Not Fancy	October 2, 2015	1 h 3 min	English
Anthony Jeselnik: Thoughts and Prayers	October 16, 2015	59 min	English
John Mulaney: The Comeback Kid	November 13, 2015	1 h 1 min	English
I'm Brent Morin	December 1, 2015	1 h 7 min	English
Mike Epps: Don't Take It Personal	December 18, 2015	59 min	English
Tom Segura: Mostly Stories	January 8, 2016	1 h 13 min	English
Hannibal Buress: Comedy Camisado	February 5, 2016	1 h 7 min	English
Theo Von: No Offense	February 26, 2016	1 h 6 min	English
Jimmy Carr: Funny Business	March 18, 2016	1 h 2 min	English
Patton Oswalt: Talking for Clapping	April 22, 2016	1 h 5 min	English
Ali Wong: Baby Cobra	May 6, 2016	1 h	English
Bo Burnham: Make Happy	June 3, 2016	1 h	English
Jim Jefferies: Freedumb	July 1, 2016	1 h 26 min	English
David Cross: Making America Great Again	August 5, 2016	1 h 13 min	English
Jeff Foxworthy & Larry the Cable Guy: We've Been Thinking	August 26, 2016	1 h 14 min	English
Jandino: Whatever It Takes	September 9, 2016	1 h 34 min	Dutch
Cedric the Entertainer: Live from the Ville	September 16, 2016	1 h	English
Iliza Shlesinger: Confirmed Kills	September 23, 2016	1 h 17 min	English
Russell Peters: Almost Famous	October 7, 2016	1 h 13 min	English
Joe Rogan: Triggered	October 21, 2016	1 h 3 min	English
Dana Carvey: Straight White Male, 60	November 4, 2016	1 h 4 min	English
Dieter Nuhr: Nuhr in Berlin	November 15, 2016	1 h 8 min	German
Colin Quinn: The New York Story	November 18, 2016	1 h 2 min	English
Carlos Ballarta: El amor es de putos	November 21, 2016	1 h 7 min	Spanish
Michael Che Matters	November 25, 2016	1 h	English
Reggie Watts: Spatial	December 6, 2016	1 h 1 min	English
Ricardo O'Farrill: Abrazo navideño	December 12, 2016	31 min	Spanish
Gabriel Iglesias: I'm Sorry for What I Said When I Was Hungry	December 20, 2016	1 h 10 min	English
Jen Kirkman: Just Keep Livin'?	January 3, 2017	1 h 9 min	English
Jim Gaffigan: Cinco	January 10, 2017	1 h 13 min	English
Neal Brennan: 3 Mics	January 17, 2017	1 h 5 min	English
Cristela Alonzo: Lower Classy	January 24, 2017	1 h 6 min	English
Gad Gone Wild	January 24, 2017	57 min	French
Bill Burr: Walk Your Way Out	January 31, 2017	1 h 17 min	English
Daniel Sosa: Sosafado	February 3, 2017	1 h 17 min	Spanish
Grillo vs. Grillo	February 10, 2017	1 h 35 min	Italian
Katherine Ryan: In Trouble	February 14, 2017	1 h 3 min	English
Trevor Noah: Afraid of the Dark	February 21, 2017	1 h 7 min	English
Mike Birbiglia: Thank God for Jokes	February 28, 2017	1 h 10 min	English
Amy Schumer: The Leather Special	March 7, 2017	57 min	English
Jim Norton: Mouthful of Shame	March 14, 2017	1 h 1 min	English
Felipe Neto: My Life Makes No Sense	March 24, 2017	1 h 30 min	Portuguese
Jo Koy: Live from Seattle	March 28, 2017	1 h 2 min	English
Louis C.K. 2017	April 4, 2017	1 h 14 min	English
Lucas Brothers: On Drugs	April 18, 2017	49 min	English
Vir Das: Abroad Understanding	April 25, 2017	1 h 5 min	English
Maria Bamford: Old Baby	May 2, 2017	1 h 4 min	English
Simplemente Manu NNa	May 5, 2017	1 h 11 min	Spanish
Norm Macdonald: Hitler's Dog, Gossip & Trickery	May 9, 2017	1 h 1 min	English
Tracy Morgan: Staying Alive	May 16, 2017	58 min	English
Hasan Minhaj: Homecoming King	May 23, 2017	1 h 12 min	English
Sarah Silverman: A Speck of Dust	May 30, 2017	1 h 11 min	English
Nick Kroll & John Mulaney: Oh, Hello on Broadway	June 13, 2017	1 h 42 min	English
Marco Luque: Tamo Junto	June 15, 2017	1 h 13 min	Portuguese
Rory Scovel Tries Stand-Up for the First Time	June 20, 2017	1 h 6 min	English
Chris D'Elia: Man on Fire	June 27, 2017	1 h 5 min	English
Aditi Mittal: Things They Wouldn't Let Me Say	July 18, 2017	1 h 2 min	English
Joe Mande's Award Winning Comedy Special	July 25, 2017	1 h 6 min	English
Maz Jobrani: Immigrant	August 1, 2017	1 h 7 min	English
Alan Saldaña: Mi vida de pobre	August 4, 2017	53 min	Spanish
Brad Paisley's Comedy Rodeo	August 15, 2017	1 h 4 min	English
Lynne Koplitz: Hormonal Beast	August 22, 2017	51 min	English
Ryan Hamilton: Happy Face	August 29, 2017	56 min	English
Marc Maron: Too Real	September 5, 2017	1 h 10 min	English
Fabrizio Copano: Solo pienso en mi	September 8, 2017	59 min	Spanish
Joaquin Reyes: Una y no más	September 8, 2017	1 h 17 min	Spanish
Jeff Dunham: Relative Disaster	September 12, 2017	1 h 10 min	English
Jerry Before Seinfeld	September 19, 2017	1 h 1 min	English
Def Comedy Jam 25	September 26, 2017	1 h 21 min	English
Rodney Carrington: Here Comes the Truth	October 3, 2017	1 h 6 min	English
Christina P: Mother Inferior	October 10, 2017	59 min	English
El Especial de Alex Fernández, el Especial	October 13, 2017	52 min	Spanish
Patton Oswalt: Annihilation	October 17, 2017	1 h 6 min	English
Jack Whitehall: At Large	October 24, 2017	1 h 7 min	English
Judah Friedlander: America Is the Greatest Country in the United States	October 31, 2017	1 h 24 min	English
Alexis de Anda: Mea Culpa	November 10, 2017	54 min	Spanish
DeRay Davis: How to Act Black	November 14, 2017	1 h 6 min	English
Brian Regan: Nunchucks and Flamethrowers	November 21, 2017	1 h 1 min	English
Craig Ferguson: Tickle Fight	December 5, 2017	1 h 6 min	English
Judd Apatow: The Return	December 12, 2017	1 h 9 min	English
Russell Howard: Recalibrate	December 19, 2017	1 h 9 min	English
Todd Barry: Spicy Honey	December 26, 2017	1 h	English
Alejandro Riaño: Especial de stand up	January 10, 2018	1 h	Spanish
Tom Segura: Disgraceful	January 12, 2018	1 h 11 min	English
Katt Williams: Great America	January 16, 2018	1 h	English
Arango y Sanint: Riase el show	January 17, 2018	1 h 2 min	Spanish
Harith Iskander: I Told You So	January 19, 2018	1 h 1 min	English
Todd Glass: Act Happy	January 23, 2018	1 h 2 min	English
Ricardo Quevedo: Hay gente asi	January 24, 2018	58 min	Spanish
Mau Nieto: Viviendo sobrio... desde el bar	January 26, 2018	57 min	Spanish
Sebastian Marcelo Wainraich	January 26, 2018	49 min	Spanish
Fakkah Fuzz: Almost Banned	January 26, 2018	1 h	English
Kavin Jay: Everybody Calm Down!	February 2, 2018	53 min	English
Fred Armisen: Standup for Drummers	February 6, 2018	1 h 5 min	English
Chris Rock: Tamborine	February 14, 2018	1 h 4 min	English
Agustín Aristarán: Soy Rada	February 16, 2018	1 h	Spanish
Marlon Wayans: Woke-ish	February 27, 2018	1 h 6 min	English
Adel Karam: Live From Beirut	March 1, 2018	58 min	Arabic
Malena Pichot: Estupidez compleja	March 2, 2018	50 min	Spanish
Natalia Valdebenito: El Especial	March 2, 2018	1 h 8 min	Spanish
Edmilson Filho: Notas, Uma Comédia de Relacionamentos	March 2, 2018	1 h 19 min	Portuguese
Gad Elmaleh: American Dream	March 6, 2018	57 min	English
Ricky Gervais: Humanity	March 13, 2018	1 h 18 min	English
Yoo Byung-jae: Too Much Information	March 16, 2018	1 h 3 min	Korean
Sofía Niño de Rivera: Selección natural	March 30, 2018	1 h 1 min	Spanish
Fary Is the New Black	April 3, 2018	1 h 14 min	French
Seth Rogen's Hilarity for Charity	April 6, 2018	1 h 10 min	English
Todo lo que sería de Lucas Lauriente	April 6, 2018	1 h 18 min	Spanish
Greg Davies: You Magnificent Beast	April 10, 2018	1 h 6 min	English
Kevin James: Never Don't Give Up	April 24, 2018	1 h 2 min	English
Enissa Amani: Ehrenwort	April 26, 2018	1 h 5 min	German
John Mulaney: Kid Gorgeous at Radio City	May 1, 2018	1 h 4 min	English
Dany Boon: Des Hauts-De-France	May 4, 2018	1 h 53 min	French
Hari Kondabolu: Warn Your Relatives	May 8, 2018	1 h 7 min	English
Carlos Ballarta: Furia Ñera	May 11, 2018	1 h 2 min	Spanish
Ali Wong: Hard Knock Wife	May 13, 2018	1 h 4 min	English
Tig Notaro: Happy to Be Here	May 22, 2018	58 min	English
Steve Martin & Martin Short: An Evening You Will Forget for the Rest of Your Life	May 25, 2018	1 h 13 min	English
Fernando Sanjiao: Hombre	May 25, 2018	1 h 3 min	Spanish
Franco Escamilla: Por la anécdota	June 8, 2018	1 h 6 min	Spanish
Hannah Gadsby: Nanette	June 19, 2018	1 h 9 min	English
W. Kamau Bell: Private School Negro	June 26, 2018	1 h 5 min	English
Jani Dueñas: Grandes fracasos de ayer y hoy	June 29, 2018	1 h 17 min	Spanish
Luciano Mellera: Infantiloide	July 6, 2018	1 h 6 min	Spanish
Jim Jefferies: This Is Me Now	July 13, 2018	1 h 10 min	English
Iliza Shlesinger: Elder Millennial	July 24, 2018	1 h 12 min	English
Coco y Raulito: Carrusel de ternura	July 27, 2018	56 min	Spanish
Demetri Martin: The Overthinker	August 10, 2018	56 min	English
Yoo Byung-jae: Discomfort Zone	August 17, 2018	54 min	Korean
Bert Kreischer: Secret Time	August 24, 2018	57 min	English
D. L. Hughley: Contrarian	September 18, 2018	58 min	English
Rafinha Bastos: Ultimatum	September 21, 2018	1 h 2 min	Portuguese
Joe Rogan: Strange Times	October 2, 2018	1 h 3 min	English
Mo Amer: The Vagabond	October 8, 2018	56 min	English
Ron White: If You Quit Listening, I'll Shut Up	October 16, 2018	1 h 3 min	English
Adam Sandler: 100% Fresh	October 23, 2018	1 h 13 min	English
John Leguizamo's Latin History for Morons	November 5, 2018	1 h 31 min	English
Trevor Noah: Son of Patricia	November 20, 2018	1 h 3 min	English
Russell Brand: Re:Birth	December 4, 2018	1 h 3 min	English
Vir Das: Losing It	December 11, 2018	1 h 7 min	English
Ellen DeGeneres: Relatable	December 18, 2018	1 h 8 min	English
Sebastian Maniscalco: Stay Hungry	January 15, 2019	1 h 5 min	English
Gabriel "Fluffy" Iglesias: One Show Fits All	January 29, 2019	1 h 30 min	English
Ray Romano: Right Here, Around the Corner	February 5, 2019	58 min	English
Ken Jeong: You Complete Me, Ho	February 14, 2019	1 h 2 min	English
Jimmy Carr: The Best of Ultimate Gold Greatest Hits	March 12, 2019	58 min	English
Edoardo Ferrario: Temi Caldi	March 15, 2019	1 h 5 min	Italian
Amy Schumer Growing	March 19, 2019	1 h	English
Nate Bargatze: The Tennessee Kid	March 26, 2019	1 h	English
Kevin Hart: Irresponsible	April 2, 2019	1 h	English
Ricardo Quevedo: Los amargados somos más	April 3, 2019	58 min	Spanish
Liss Pereira: Reteniendo líquidos	April 10, 2019	59 min	Spanish
Francesco De Carlo: Cose di questo mondo	April 12, 2019	1 h 1 min	Italian
Franco Escamilla: Bienvenido al mundo	April 17, 2019	54 min	Spanish
Anthony Jeselnik: Fire in the Maternity Ward	April 30, 2019	1 h 4 min	English
Saverio Raimondo: Il Satiro Parlante	May 17, 2019	53 min	Italian
Wanda Sykes: Not Normal	May 21, 2019	1 h 6 min	English
Miranda Sings Live ... Your Welcome	June 4, 2019	1 h 1 min	English
Jo Koy: Comin' in Hot	June 12, 2019	1 h	English
Adam DeVine: Best Time of Our Lives	June 18, 2019	58 min	English
Mike Epps: Only One Mike	June 25, 2019	1 h 3 min	English
Daniel Sosa: Maleducado	June 27, 2019	54 min	Spanish
Katherine Ryan: Glitter Room	July 1, 2019	1 h 5 min	English
Aziz Ansari: Right Now	July 9, 2019	1 h 5 min	English
Whitney Cummings: Can I Touch It?	July 30, 2019	59 min	English
Whindersson Nunes: Adulto	August 15, 2019	1 h 8 min	Portuguese
Simon Amstell: Set Free	August 20, 2019	51 min	English
Dave Chappelle: Sticks & Stones	August 26, 2019	1 h 5 min	English
Bill Burr: Paper Tiger	September 10, 2019	1 h 7 min	English
Jeff Dunham: Beside Himself	September 24, 2019	58 min	English
Mo Gilligan: Momentum	September 30, 2019	1 h 4 min	English
Nikki Glaser: Bangin'	October 1, 2019	1 h 3 min	English
Deon Cole: Cole Hearted	October 8, 2019	1 h 9 min	English
Martin Matte: La vie, la mort...eh la la..!	October 14, 2019	1 h 1 min	French
Park Na-rae: Glamor Warning	October 16, 2019	1 h 2 min	Korean
Jenny Slate: Stage Fright	October 22, 2019	1 h 6 min	English
Arsenio Hall: Smart & Classy	October 29, 2019	1 h 3 min	English
Grego Rossello: Disculpe las molestias	October 31, 2019	1 h 5 min	Spanish
Seth Meyers: Lobby Baby	November 5, 2019	1 h 1 min	English
Jeff Garlin: Our Man in Chicago	November 12, 2019	58 min	English
Fadily Camara: La plus drôle de tes copines	November 14, 2019	54 min	French
Iliza Shlesinger: Unveiled	November 19, 2019	1 h 18 min	English
Mike Birbiglia: The New One	November 26, 2019	1 h 25 min	English
Tiffany Haddish: Black Mitzvah	December 3, 2019	55 min	English
Michelle Wolf: Joke Show	December 10, 2019	59 min	English
Ronny Chieng: Asian Comedian Destroys America!	December 17, 2019	1 h 3 min	English
Leslie Jones: Time Machine	January 14, 2020	1 h 6 min	English
Fortune Feimster: Sweet & Salty	January 21, 2020	1 h 1 min	English
Alex Fernández: The Best Comedian in the World	January 23, 2020	51 min	Spanish
Vir Das: For India	January 26, 2020	1 h 15 min	English
Tom Papa: You're Doing Great!	February 4, 2020	1 h	English
Pete Davidson: Alive From New York	February 25, 2020	49 min	English
Amit Tandon: Family Tandoncies	February 28, 2020	1 h 12 min	Hindi
Taylor Tomlinson: Quarter-Life Crisis	March 3, 2020	1 h 1 min	English
Marc Maron: End Times Fun	March 10, 2020	1 h 11 min	English
Bert Kreischer: Hey Big Boy	March 17, 2020	1 h 2 min	English
Tom Segura: Ball Hog	March 24, 2020	1 h 10 min	English
David Batra: Elefanten i rummet	April 1, 2020	1 h 17 min	Swedish
Chris D'Elia: No Pain	April 14, 2020	55 min	English
Mauricio Meirelles: Generating Chaos	April 16, 2020	1 h 3 min	Portuguese
Yours Sincerely, Kanan Gill	April 24, 2020	1 h 12 min	English
Jerry Seinfeld: 23 Hours to Kill	May 5, 2020	1 h	English
Hannah Gadsby: Douglas	May 26, 2020	1 h 12 min	English
Kenny Sebastian: The Most Interesting Person in the Room	May 29, 2020	1 h 7 min	English
Jo Koy: In His Elements	June 12, 2020	55 min	English
Eric Andre: Legalize Everything	June 23, 2020	51 min	English
George Lopez: We'll Do It for Half	June 30, 2020	51 min	English
Thiago Ventura: POKAS	July 2, 2020	1 h 22 min	Portuguese
Jim Jefferies: Intolerant	July 7, 2020	1 h 6 min	English
Urzila Carlson: Overqualified Loser	July 14, 2020	1 h 2 min	English
Jack Whitehall: I'm Only Joking	July 21, 2020	58 min	English
Sam Jay: 3 in the Morning	August 4, 2020	1 h 4 min	English
Rob Schneider: Asian Momma, Mexican Kids	August 11, 2020	44 min	English
Afonso Padilha: Classless	September 3, 2020	1 h 3 min	Portuguese
Michael McIntyre: Showman	September 15, 2020	1 h 2 min	English
Michelle Buteau: Welcome to Buteaupia	September 29, 2020	58 min	English
Felix Lobrecht: Hype	November 3, 2020	59 min	German
Kevin Hart: Zero F**ks Given	November 17, 2020	1 h 9 min	English
Natalie Palamides: Nate – A One Man Show	December 1, 2020	59 min	English
Ari Eldjárn: Pardon My Icelandic	December 2, 2020	54 min	English
Hazel Brugger: Tropical	December 2, 2020	58 min	German
Vir Das: Outside In – The Lockdown Special	December 16, 2020	50 min	English
London Hughes: To Catch a D*ck	December 22, 2020	1 h 8 min	English
Best of Stand-Up 2020	December 31, 2020	1 h 16 min	English
Chris Rock Total Blackout: The Tamborine Extended Cut	January 12, 2021	1 h 37 min	English
Hate by Dani Rovira	February 12, 2021	1 h 22 min	Spanish
Brian Regan: On the Rocks	February 23, 2021	58 min	English
RebellComedy: Straight Outta the Zoo	March 16, 2021	1 h 14 min	German
Nate Bargatze: The Greatest Average American	March 18, 2021	1 h	English
Loyiso Gola: Unlearning	March 23, 2021	1 h	English
Soy Rada: Serendipity	May 27, 2021	1 h 8 min	Spanish
Bo Burnham: Inside	May 30, 2021	1 h 27 min	English
Alan Saldaña: Locked Up	June 3, 2021	49 min	Spanish
Lee Su-geun: The Sense Coach	July 9, 2021	45 min	Korean
Phil Wang: Philly Philly Wang Wang	August 10, 2021	1 h 3 min	English
Lokillo: Nothing's the Same	August 12, 2021	1 h 3 min	Spanish
Dave Chappelle: The Closer	October 5, 2021	1 h 12 min	English
One Night in Paris	October 14, 2021	1 h 4 min	French
Theo Von: Regular People	October 19, 2021	1 h 1 min	English
Haroun	October 27, 2021	1 h 16 min	French
Michael Che: Shame the Devil	November 16, 2021	58 min	English
Carlos Ballarta: False Prophet	November 18, 2021	1 h 3 min	Spanish
Jonas Brothers Family Roast	November 23, 2021	1 h 8 min	English
Mo Amer: Mohammed in Texas	November 30, 2021	1 h 4 min	English
Nicole Byer: BBW (Big Beautiful Weirdo)	December 7, 2021	1 h 5 min	English
Carolin Kebekus: The Last Christmas Special	December 8, 2021	1 h 6 min	German
Jim Gaffigan: Comedy Monster	December 21, 2021	1 h 10 min	English
Jimmy Carr: His Dark Material	December 25, 2021	59 min	English
Cem Yılmaz: Diamond Elite Platinum Plus	December 31, 2021	1 h 34 min	Turkish
Aziz Ansari: Nightclub Comedian	January 25, 2022	29 min	English
Kapil Sharma: I'm Not Done Yet	January 28, 2022	54 min	Hindi
Ms. Pat: Y'all Wanna Hear Something Crazy?	February 8, 2022	54 min	English
Ali Wong: Don Wong	February 14, 2022	59 min	English
Mo Gilligan: There's Mo to Life	February 17, 2022	1 h 5 min	English
Chappelle's Home Team – Earthquake: Legendary	February 28, 2022	36 min	English
Whindersson Nunes: My Own Show	March 3, 2022	1 h 3 min	Portuguese
Taylor Tomlinson: Look at You	March 8, 2022	1 h 1 min	English
Catherine Cohen: The Twist ...? She's Gorgeous	March 15, 2022	1 h 1 min	English
Jeff Foxworthy: The Good Old Days	March 22, 2022	1 h	English
Mike Epps: Indiana Mike	March 29, 2022	58 min	English
Ronny Chieng: Speakeasy	April 5, 2022	1 h	English
Michela Giraud: The Truth, I Swear!	April 6, 2022	1 h 3 min	Italian
All About Gila	April 21, 2022	1 h 16 min	Spanish
David Spade: Nothing Personal	April 26, 2022	1 h 6 min	English
Chris DiStefano: Speshy Weshy	May 3, 2022	36 min	English
Christina P.: Mom Genes	May 8, 2022	1 h 2 min	English
Katt Williams: World War III	May 17, 2022	59 min	English
Rodrigo Sant'Anna: I'm Here, I'm Queer!	May 19, 2022	1 h 2 min	Portuguese
The Hall: Honoring the Greats of Stand-Up	May 19, 2022	1 h 10 min	English
Ricky Gervais: Supernature	May 24, 2022	1 h 4 min	English
Norm Macdonald: Nothing Special	May 30, 2022	1 h 26 min	English
Yuri Marçal: Honest Mistake	June 2, 2022	59 min	Portuguese
Bill Burr Presents: Friends Who Kill	June 6, 2022	1 h 13 min	English
Stand Out: An LGBTQ+ Celebration	June 9, 2022	1 h 36 min	English
Amy Schumer Presents: Parental Advisory	June 11, 2022	57 min	English
Pete Davidson Presents: The Best Friends	June 13, 2022	58 min	English
Jane Fonda & Lily Tomlin: Ladies Night Live	June 14, 2022	1 h 7 min	English
Snoop Dogg's F*cn Around Comedy Special	June 16, 2022	1 h 7 min	English
Joel Kim Booster: Psychosexual	June 21, 2022	1 h 7 min	English
Bruna Louise: Demolition	June 22, 2022	1 h 5 min	Portuguese
Paul Virzi: Nocturnal Admissions	June 23, 2022	1 h 5 min	English
Cristela Alonzo: Middle Classy	June 28, 2022	59 min	English
Bill Burr: Live at Red Rocks	July 12, 2022	1 h 22 min	English
The Best of Netflix Is a Joke: The Festival	July 17, 2022	54 min	English
David A. Arnold: It Ain't for the Weak	July 19, 2022	1 h 18 min	English
Whitney Cummings: Jokes	July 26, 2022	59 min	English
Ricardo Quevedo: Tomorrow Will Be Worse	August 2, 2022	1 h	Spanish
Bo Burnham: The Inside Outtakes	August 11, 2022	1 h 3 min	English
Tim Dillon: A Real Hero	August 16, 2022	48 min	English
Sam Morril: Same Time Tomorrow	September 1, 2022	43 min	English
Rodrigo Marques: King of Uncouth	September 6, 2022	1 h 15 min	Portuguese
Sheng Wang: Sweet and Juicy	September 6, 2022	1 h	English
Jo Koy: Live from the LA Forum	September 13, 2022	1 h 14 min	English
Liss Pereira: Adulting	September 15, 2022	1 h 3 min	Spanish
Patton Oswalt: We All Scream	September 20, 2022	58 min	English
Nick Kroll: Little Big Boy	September 27, 2022	1 h 6 min	English
Hasan Minhaj: The King's Jester	October 4, 2022	1 h 8 min	English
Kev Adams: The Real Me	October 7, 2022	1 h	French
DEAW#13 Udom Taephanich Stand Up Comedy Show	October 11, 2022	2 h 52 min	Thai
Iliza Shlesinger: Hot Forever	October 11, 2022	1 h 8 min	English
Gabriel Iglesias: Stadium Fluffy	October 18, 2022	1 h 55 min	English
Franco Escamilla: Eavesdropping	October 23, 2022	2 h 2 min	Spanish
Fortune Feimster: Good Fortune	October 25, 2022	1 h 3 min	English
Panayotis Pascot: Almost	November 3, 2022	1 h 18 min	French
Neal Brennan: Blocks	November 8, 2022	1 h 2 min	English
Deon Cole: Charleen's Boy	November 15, 2022	1 h 7 min	English
Johanna Nordström: Call the Police	November 15, 2022	59 min	Swedish
Trevor Noah: I Wish You Would	November 22, 2022	1 h 8 min	English
Sebastian Maniscalco: Is It Me?	December 6, 2022	1 h 7 min	English
Tom Papa: What a Day!	December 13, 2022	1 h	English
Mathieu Dufour at Bell Centre	December 22, 2022	1 h 3 min	French
Vir Das: Landing	December 26, 2022	1 h 6 min	English
Chelsea Handler: Revolution	December 27, 2022	1 h 17 min	English
Best of Stand-Up 2022	December 31, 2022	1 h 16 min	English
Andrew Santino: Cheeseburger	January 10, 2023	58 min	English
Jim Jefferies: High n' Dry	February 14, 2023	1 h 8 min	English
Whindersson Nunes: Preaching to the Choir	February 19, 2023	1 h 7 min	Portuguese
Sommore: Queen Chandelier	February 21, 2023	1 h 9 min	English
Chris Rock: Selective Outrage	March 4, 2023	1 h 9 min	English
Bert Kreischer: Razzle Dazzle	March 14, 2023	1 h 1 min	English
Mae Martin: SAP	March 28, 2023	1 h 10 min	English
Mo'Nique: My Name Is Mo'Nique	April 4, 2023	1 h 16 min	English
Leanne Morgan: I'm Every Woman	April 11, 2023	1 h 14 min	English
Celeste Barber: Fine, thanks	April 12, 2023	59 min	English
John Mulaney: Baby J	April 25, 2023	1 h 20 min	English
Hannah Gadsby: Something Special	May 9, 2023	1 h 14 min	English
Wanda Sykes: I'm an Entertainer	May 23, 2023	1 h 1 min	English
Amy Schumer: Emergency Contact	June 13, 2023	51 min	English
85 South: Ghetto Legends	June 20, 2023	54 min	English
Tom Segura: Sledgehammer	July 4, 2023	1 h 1 min	English
Mark Normand: Soup to Nuts	July 25, 2023	53 min	English
Jared Freid: 37 and Single	August 15, 2023	1 h 7 min	English
Shane Gillis: Beautiful Dogs	September 5, 2023	52 min	English
Kountry Wayne: A Woman's Prayer	September 19, 2023	1 h	English
Chappelle's Home Team – Luenell: Town Business	September 26, 2023	33 min	English
Beth Stelling: If You Didn't Want Me Then	October 3, 2023	59 min	English
Heather McMahan: Son I Never Had	October 17, 2023	1 h 6 min	English
Pete Holmes: I Am Not for Everyone	October 24, 2023	1 h 5 min	English
Ralph Barbosa: Cowabunga	October 31, 2023	1 h 4 min	English
The Improv: 60 and Still Standing	November 7, 2023	1 h 20 min	English
Matt Rife: Natural Selection	November 15, 2023	1 h 4 min	English
Mike Birbiglia: The Old Man and the Pool	November 21, 2023	1 h 17 min	English
Stavros Halkias: Fat Rascal	December 5, 2023	55 min	English
Trevor Noah: Where Was I	December 19, 2023	1 h 8 min	English
Ricky Gervais: Armageddon	December 25, 2023	1 h 2 min	English
Dave Chappelle: The Dreamer	December 31, 2023	56 min	English
Pete Davidson: Turbo Fonzarelli	January 9, 2024	56 min	English
Dusty Slay: Workin' Man	January 16, 2024	1 h 9 min	English
Rachid Badouri: Les fleurs du tapis	January 18, 2024	1 h 39 min	French
Jacqueline Novak: Get on Your Knees	January 23, 2024	1 h 34 min	English
Jack Whitehall: Settle Down	January 30, 2024	1 h 5 min	English
Taylor Tomlinson: Have It All	February 13, 2024	1 h 6 min	English
Mike Epps: Ready to Sell Out	February 20, 2024	1 h 1 min	English
Chappelle's Home Team – Donnell Rawlings: A New Day	February 27, 2024	40 min	English
Hannah Gadsby's Gender Agenda	March 5, 2024	1 h 15 min	English
Steve Treviño: Simple Man	March 12, 2024	56 min	English
Red Ollero: Mabuhay Is a Lie	March 14, 2024	1 h 12 min	Filipino
Brian Simpson: Live from the Mothership	March 19, 2024	1 h 11 min	English
Dave Attell: Hot Cross Buns	March 26, 2024	40 min	English
Demetri Martin: Demetri Deconstructed	April 2, 2024	51 min	English
Neal Brennan: Crazy Good	April 9, 2024	53 min	English
Jimmy Carr: Natural Born Killer	April 16, 2024	59 min	English
Fern Brady: Autistic Bikini Queen	April 22, 2024	57 min	English
Deaw Special: Super Soft Power	May 1, 2024	2 h 18 min	Thai
Katt Williams: Woke Foke	May 4, 2024	1 h 3 min	English
The Roast of Tom Brady	May 5, 2024	3 h 4 min	English
Kevin Hart: The Kennedy Center Mark Twain Prize for American Humor	May 11, 2024	1 h 19 min	English
Rachel Feinstein: Big Guy	May 21, 2024	54 min	English
Franco Escamilla: Ladies' Man	May 24, 2024	1 h 13 min	Spanish
Jo Koy: Live from Brooklyn	June 4, 2024	59 min	English
Keith Robinson: Different Strokes	June 11, 2024	53 min	English
Hannah Berner: We Ride at Dawn	July 9, 2024	50 min	English
Chad Daniels: Empty Nester	July 16, 2024	1 h 1 min	English
Joe Rogan: Burn the Boats	August 3, 2024	1 h 7 min	English
Matt Rife: Lucid – A Crowd Work Special	August 13, 2024	54 min	English
Langston Kerman: Bad Poetry	August 20, 2024	50 min	English
Adam Sandler: Love You	August 27, 2024	1 h 14 min	English
Phil Wang: Wang in There, Baby!	September 3, 2024	1 h 1 min	English
Ahir Shah: Ends	September 10, 2024	1 h 1 min	English
Deon Cole: Ok, Mister	September 17, 2024	1 h 5 min	English
Ellen DeGeneres: For Your Approval	September 24, 2024	1 h 10 min	English
Tim Dillon: This Is Your Country	October 1, 2024	47 min	English
Ali Wong: Single Lady	October 8, 2024	59 min	English
Rachel Bloom: Death, Let Me Do My Special	October 15, 2024	1 h 17 min	English
Hasan Minhaj: Off With His Head	October 22, 2024	1 h 1 min	English
Tom Papa: Home Free	October 29, 2024	1 h 2 min	English
Adrienne Iapalucci: The Dark Queen	November 12, 2024	52 min	English
Adam Ray Is Dr. Phil Unleashed	November 19, 2024	49 min	English
Anthony Jeselnik: Bones and All	November 26, 2024	51 min	English
Fortune Feimster: Crushing It	December 3, 2024	58 min	English
Jamie Foxx: What Had Happened Was...	December 10, 2024	1 h 8 min	English
Ronny Chieng: Love to Hate It	December 17, 2024	1 h 5 min	English
Your Friend, Nate Bargatze	December 24, 2024	1 h 3 min	English
Torching 2024: A Roast of the Year	December 27, 2024	42 min	English
Michelle Buteau: A Buteau-ful Mind at Radio City Music Hall	December 31, 2024	1 h 4 min	English
Gabriel Iglesias: Legend of Fluffy	January 7, 2025	1 h 41 min	English
Ari Shaffir: America’s Sweetheart	January 14, 2025	1 h 15 min	English
Liza Treyger: Night Owl	January 28, 2025	1 h 2 min	English
Felipe Esparza: Raging Fool	February 11, 2025	1 h 5 min	English
Rosebud Baker: The Mother Lode	February 18, 2025	54 min	English
Andrew Schulz: Life	March 4, 2025	59 min	English
Bert Kreischer: Lucky	March 18, 2025	1 h 7 min	English
Chelsea Handler: The Feeling	March 25, 2025	59 min	English
Kill Tony: Kill or Be Killed	April 7, 2025	2 h 11 min	English
Tim Dillon: I'm Your Mother	April 15, 2025	41 min	English
Conan O'Brien: The Kennedy Center Mark Twain Prize for American Humor	May 4, 2025	1 h 26 min	English
Sarah Silverman: PostMortem	May 20, 2025	1 h 3 min	English
Mike Birbiglia: The Good Life	May 26, 2025	1 h 17 min	English
Justin Willman: Magic Lover	June 17, 2025	1 h 4 min	English
Steph Tolev: Filth Queen	June 24, 2025	56 min	English
Nate Jackson: Super Funny	July 8, 2025	1 h 3 min	English
Dani Rovira: It’s Worth It	July 11, 2025	1 h 21 min	Spanish
Vir Das: Fool Volume	July 18, 2025	1 h 3 min	English
Dusty Slay: Wet Heat	July 29, 2025	1 h 10 min	English
Jim Jefferies: Two Limb Policy	August 12, 2025	1 h 2 min	English
Kill Tony: Mayhem at Madison Square Garden	August 25, 2025	2 h 17 min	English
Jordan Jensen: Take Me With You	September 9, 2025	1 h 2 min	English
Cristela Alonzo: Upper Classy	September 23, 2025	1 h 2 min	English
Earthquake: Joke Telling Business	September 30, 2025	45 min	English
Matt McCusker: A Humble Offering	October 7, 2025	1 h 1 min	English
Michelle Wolf: The Well	October 21, 2025	1 h	English
Mo Amer: Wild World	October 28, 2025	53 min	English
Leanne Morgan: Unspeakable Things	November 4, 2025	1 h 5 min	English
Gerry Dee: Funny You Should Say That	November 18, 2025	54 min	English
Kevin Hart: Acting My Age	November 24, 2025	1 h 6 min	English
Matt Rife: Unwrapped – A Christmas Crowd Work Special	December 2, 2025	58 min	English
Robby Hoffman: Wake Up	December 14, 2025	1 h 6 min	English
Dave Chappelle: The Unstoppable...	December 20, 2025	1 h 15 min	English
Tom Segura: Teacher	December 24, 2025	1 h 7 min	English
Ricky Gervais: Mortality	December 30, 2025	59 min	English
Cem Yılmaz: CMMXXIV	December 31, 2025	1 h 53 min	Turkish
Marcello Hernández: American Boy	January 7, 2026	1 h 4 min	English
Kill Tony: Once Upon a Time in Texas	January 12, 2026	2 h 18 min	English
Mike Epps: Delusional	January 27, 2026	59 min	English
Mo Gilligan: In the Moment	February 3, 2026	1 h 2 min	English
Katt Williams: The Last Report	February 10, 2026	58 min	English
Sommore: Chandelier Fly	February 17, 2026	1 h 8 min	English
Taylor Tomlinson: Prodigal Daughter	February 24, 2026	1 h 9 min	English
Bruce Bruce: I Ain't Playin'	March 3, 2026	56 min	English
Derrick Stroup: Nostalgic	March 10, 2026	57 min	English
Mark Normand: None Too Pleased	March 17, 2026	54 min	English
Jeff Ross: Take a Banana for the Ride	March 24, 2026	1 h 30 min	English
Aaron Chen: Funny Garden	March 31, 2026	46 min	English
Sarah Millican: Late Bloomer	April 1, 2026	59 min	English
Sheng Wang: Purple	April 7, 2026	1 h 1 min	English
Trevor Noah: Joy in the Trenches	April 14, 2026	1 h 8 min	English
KillTonyMania	April 20, 2026	1 h 33 min	English
The Roast of Kevin Hart	May 10, 2026	2 h 52 min	English
Wanda Sykes: Legacy	May 19, 2026	1 h 4 min	English
AFI Life Achievement Award: A Tribute to Eddie Murphy	May 31, 2026	1 h 23 min	English
The Hot Seat	June 3, 2026	1 h 30 min	French
Tony Hinchcliffe: Man of the People	June 9, 2026	55 min	English
Ryan Hamilton: This Just Hit Me	June 23, 2026	53 min	English
Louis C.K.: Ridiculous	June 30, 2026	1 h 1 min	English
Jeff Arcuri: Nice to Meet You	July 7, 2026	1 h 3 min	English
Bill Maher: The Kennedy Center Mark Twain Prize for American Humor	July 21, 2026	1 h 22 min	English
Mary Beth Barone: Galaxy Brain	July 28, 2026	56 min	English
Rory Scovel: Show Must Go On	August 11, 2026	1 h 8 min	English
Kelsey Cook: Happy Hour	August 18, 2026	52 min	English
Stamptown	August 25, 2026	1 h	English
Jared Freid: The Family Plan	September 1, 2026	1 h 5 min	English
Stavros Halkias: Uncle Stav	September 8, 2026	1 h 4 min	English
Jo Koy: Blue in the Face	September 15, 2026	56 min	English
Papa Yaar by Zakir Khan	September 18, 2026	1 h 17 min	Hindi
Nimesh Patel: Buy the Dip	September 22, 2026	44 min	English
Sam Morril: Incorrect	September 29, 2026	47 min	English
Mojo Brookzz: I Know You Lying	October 6, 2026	47 min	English
Michael Che: Shot in Minnesota	October 13, 2026	59 min	English
Sumukhi Suresh Hoemonal	October 14, 2026	1 h 12 min	English
Theo Von: I’m Doing Fine	October 20, 2026	1 h 2 min	English
Zainab Johnson: Toxically Optimistic	October 27, 2026	1 h 4 min	English
Mike Tyson: Return of the Mike	November 3, 2026	1 h 2 min	English
Janelle James: How Romantic	November 10, 2026	57 min	English
Mike Ward: Modest	November 17, 2026	1 h 2 min	French
Awaiting release
Nate Bargatze: Good for Nathan	November 24, 2026	TBA	English
Gianmarco Soresi: God Forbid	December 3, 2026	TBA	English
Oz Pearlman: Magic of the Mind	December 22, 2026	TBA	English
Gabriel Iglesias: Lone Star Fluffy	December 24, 2026	TBA	English

== Series/collections ==
Title	Premiere	Finale	Seasons	Runtime	Language	Status
Dave Chappelle	March 21, 2017		1 collection, 2 episodes	66–67 min	English	Ended
The Standups	July 4, 2017	December 29, 2021	3 seasons, 18 episodes	27–33 min	English	Ended
Ari Shaffir: Double Negative	July 18, 2017		1 collection, 2 episodes	44–47 min	English	Ended
Dave Chappelle: Equanimity & the Bird Revelation	December 31, 2017		1 collection, 2 episodes	49–63 min	English	Ended
James Acaster: Repertoire	March 27, 2018		1 collection, 4 episodes	49–53 min	English	Ended
The Honeymoon Stand Up Special	April 17, 2018		1 collection, 3 episodes	30–34 min	English	Ended
The Comedy Lineup	July 3, 2018	August 31, 2018	2 parts, 16 episodes	14–15 min	English	Ended
Daniel Sloss: Live Shows	September 11, 2018		1 season, 2 episodes	60 min	English	Ended
The Degenerates	October 30, 2018	December 31, 2019	2 seasons, 12 episodes	17–30 min	English	Ended
Bumping Mics with Jeff Ross & Dave Attel	November 27, 2018		1 season, 3 episodes	30–43 min	English	Ended
Standup and Away! with Brian Regan	December 24, 2018		1 season, 4 episodes	23–26 min	English	Ended
Comedians of the World	January 1, 2019		13 collections, 48 episodes	23–30 min	Various	Ended
Historical Roasts	May 27, 2019		1 season, 6 episodes	28–30 min	English	Ended
Tiffany Haddish Presents: They Ready	August 13, 2019	February 2, 2021	2 seasons, 13 episodes	17–28 min	English	Ended
Zona Rosa	November 26, 2019		1 season, 4 episodes	12–15 min	Spanish	Ended
Lugar de Mulher	November 28, 2019		1 season, 4 episodes	15–16 min	Portuguese	Ended
Fary: Hexagone	March 12, 2020	April 16, 2020	2 seasons, 2 episodes	50–57 min	French	Ended
Ladies Up	March 27, 2020		1 season, 4 episodes	15–17 min	English	Ended
Middleditch and Schwartz	April 21, 2020		1 season, 3 episodes	52–53 min	English	Ended
Patton Oswalt: I Love Everything	May 19, 2020		1 season, 2 episodes	52–66 min	English	Ended
Felipe Esparza: Bad Decisions	September 1, 2020		1 season, 2 episodes	61–62 min	English/Spanish	Ended
Andrew Schulz Saves America	December 17, 2020		1 season, 4 episodes	16–17 min	English	Ended
Locombianos	June 10, 2021		1 season, 4 episodes	30–34 min	Spanish	Ended
Plastic Cup Boyz: Laughing My Mask Off!	July 27, 2021		1 season, 3 episodes	28–39 min	English	Ended
Comedy Premium League	August 20, 2021		1 season, 6 episodes	41–58 min	Hindi	Ended
Russell Howard: Lubricant	December 14, 2021		2 episodes	59–66 min	English	Miniseries
Only Jokes Allowed	February 9, 2022		1 season, 6 episodes	15–17 min	English	Ended
That's My Time with David Letterman	June 7, 2022	June 12, 2022	1 season, 6 episodes	15–19 min	English	Ended
Romesh Ranganathan: The Cynic	November 29, 2022		1 season, 2 episodes	30–62 min	English	Ended
Michelle Wolf: It's Great to Be Here	September 12, 2023		1 season, 3 episodes	20–35 min	English	Ended
Verified Stand-Up	November 28, 2023		1 season, 2 episodes	50–55 min	English	Ended

== Upcoming ==
The following projects have all been announced as being in development, but do not have a specific release date known at this time.

Title	Release date	Runtime	Language
Untitled Atsuko Okatsuka stand-up special	2027	TBA	English
Untitled Zarna Garg stand-up special	2027	TBA	TBA
Untitled Aziz Ansari stand-up special	2027	TBA	English
Untitled Bert Kreischer stand-up special	TBA	TBA	English
Untitled Leanne Morgan stand-up special	TBA	TBA	English
Untitled Nikki Glaser stand-up special (1)	TBA	TBA	English
Untitled Nikki Glaser stand-up special (2)	TBA	TBA	English
