= List of awards and nominations received by Aziz Ansari =

Aziz Ansari awards and nominations
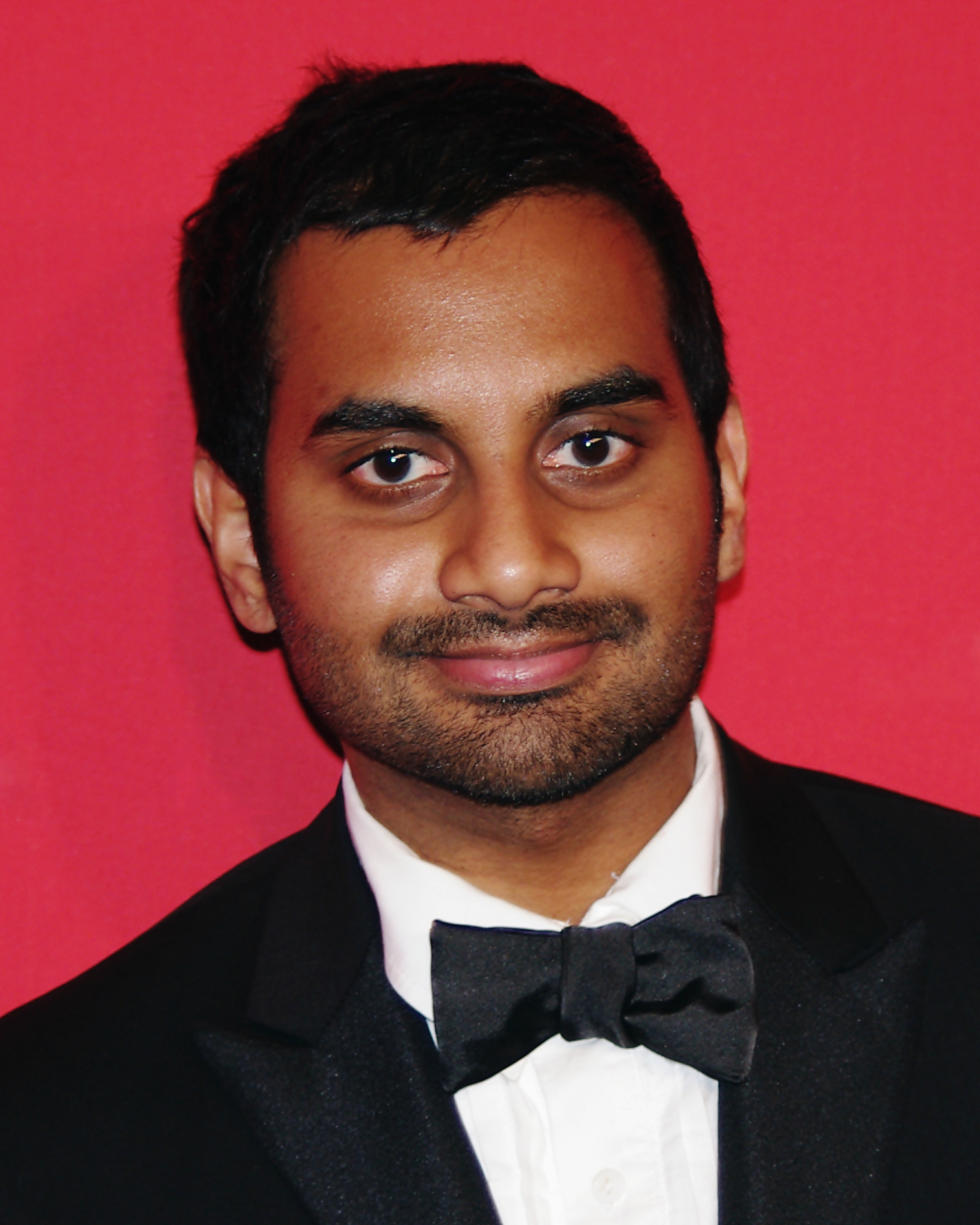
- Ansari in 2012
Awards and nominations
Award	Wins	Nominations
Critics' Choice	1	2
Emmy Awards	2	7
Golden Globes	1	2
Grammy Awards	0	1
SAG Awards	0	1

Totals (Note: Certain award groups do not simply award one winner. They acknowledge several different recipients, have runners-up, and have third place. Since this is a specific recognition and is different from losing an award, runner-up mentions are considered wins in this award tally. For simplification and to avoid errors, each award in this list has been presumed to have had a prior nomination.)
- Wins: 18
- Nominations: 53

Aziz Ansari is an American actor, comedian, and filmmaker known for his roles in film and television as well as his work as a standup comedian. He has received two Primetime Emmy Awards, a Golden Globe Award, a Peabody Award, and a Critics' Choice Award as well as nominations for a Grammy Award, a Directors Guild of America Award, a Screen Actors Guild Award, and a Writers Guild of America Award.

Ansari gained mainstream popularity portraying Tom Haverford in the NBC sitcom Parks and Recreation (2009–2015) for which he was nominated for an American Comedy Award for Best Supporting Actor in a Comedy Series. He transitioned to more mature work with his Netflix comedy series Master of None (2017–2021), where he served as a co-creator, writer, actor, and director. He won the Primetime Emmy Award for Outstanding Writing in a Comedy Series twice, the first time with Alan Yang for the episode "Parents" in 2016, and the second time with Lena Waithe for the episode "Thanksgiving" in 2017. As an actor, he won the Golden Globe Award for Best Actor – Television Series Musical or Comedy and was nominated for two Primetime Emmy Awards for Outstanding Lead Actor in a Comedy Series, a Critics' Choice Television Award for Best Actor in a Comedy Series and a Screen Actors Guild Award for Outstanding Performance by a Male Actor in a Comedy Series.

As a standup, he gained notoriety releasing his early albums starting with Intimate Moments for a Sensual Evening (2010) followed by Dangerously Delicious (2012), Buried Alive (2013), and Live at Madison Square Garden (2015). He was nominated for the Grammy Award for Best Comedy Album for Aziz Ansari: Right Now (2020). His most recent standup special Nightclub Comedian was released on Netflix in 2022.

Ansari has been recognized from numerous organizations such as Variety receiving a Power of Comedy Award in 2014, Smithsonian Magazine's American Ingenuity Award for Performing Arts in 2016, and the Britannia Award's Charlie Chaplin Award for Excellence in Comedy in 2017. Time included Ansari in their list of the Time 100 most influential people in 2016, and Rolling Stone listed him as being one of greatest stand-up comedians of all time, ranking him #49.

== Major associations ==
=== Critics' Choice Awards ===
Year	Category	Nominated work	Result	Ref.
Critics' Choice Television Award
2016	Best Comedy Series	Master of None (season one)	Won	
2016	Best Actor in a Comedy Series	Master of None (season one)	Nominated	

=== Emmy Awards ===
Year	Category	Nominated work	Result	Ref.
Primetime Emmy Awards
2016	Outstanding Comedy Series	Master of None (season one)	Nominated	
2016	Outstanding Lead Actor in a Comedy Series	Master of None (episode: "Parents")	Nominated	
2016	Outstanding Writing for a Comedy Series (Note: (shared with Alan Yang))	Master of None (episode: "Parents")	Won	
2016	Outstanding Directing for a Comedy Series	Master of None (episode: "Parents")	Nominated	
2017	Outstanding Comedy Series	Master of None (season two)	Nominated	
2017	Outstanding Lead Actor in a Comedy Series	Master of None (episode: "The Dinner Party")	Nominated	
2017	Outstanding Writing for a Comedy Series (Note: shared with Lena Waithe)	Master of None (episode: "Thanksgiving")	Won	

=== Golden Globe Awards ===
Year	Category	Nominated work	Result	Ref.
2015	Best Actor – Television Series Musical or Comedy	Master of None (season one)	Nominated	
2017	Best Actor – Television Series Musical or Comedy	Master of None (season two)	Won	

=== Grammy Awards ===
Year	Category	Nominated work	Result	Ref.
2020	Best Comedy Album	Right Now	Nominated	

=== Screen Actors Guild Awards ===
Year	Category	Nominated work	Result	Ref.
2016	Outstanding Actor in a Comedy Series	Master of None (season one)	Nominated	

== Miscellaneous awards ==
Organizations	Year	Category	Work	Result	Ref.
American Comedy Award	2014	Best Comedy Supporting Actor – TV	Parks and Recreation	Nominated	
American Comedy Award	2014	Comedy Special of the Year	Aziz Ansari: Buried Alive	Nominated	
BTVA Voice Acting Award	2014	Breakthrough Voice Actor of the Year		Nominated	
BTVA Voice Acting Award	2014	Best Male Vocal Performance in a Feature Film in a Supporting Role	Epic	Nominated	
Denver Film Critics Society	2009	Best Acting Ensemble	I Love You, Man	Nominated	
Directors Guild of America Awards	2017	Outstanding Directing – Comedy Series	Master of None (episode: "The Thief")	Nominated	
Dorian Award	2017	TV Performance of the Year	Master of None	Nominated	
Gold Derby TV Award	2016	Best Comedy Series	Master of None	Nominated	
Gold Derby TV Award	2016	Best Comedy Lead Actor	Master of None	Nominated	
NAACP Image Award	2013	Outstanding Supporting Actor in a Comedy Series	Parks and Recreation	Nominated	
NAACP Image Award	2016	Outstanding Writing in a Comedy Series	Master of None	Nominated	
NAACP Image Award	2016	Outstanding Directing in a Comedy Series	Master of None	Nominated	
Peabody Award	2017	Entertainment	Master of None	Won	
People's Choice Awards	2017	Favorite Premium Series Actor	Master of None	Nominated	
Poppy Awards	2012	Best Supporting Actor, Comedy	Parks and Recreation	Nominated	
TCA Award	2016	Individual Achievement in Comedy	Master of None (season one)	Nominated	
TCA Award	2016	Outstanding Achievement in Comedy	Master of None (season one)	Nominated	
TCA Award	2016	Outstanding New Program	Master of None (season one)	Nominated	
TCA Award	2017	Individual Achievement in Comedy	Master of None (season two)	Nominated	
TCA Award	2017	Outstanding Achievement in Comedy	Master of None (season two)	Nominated	
Teen Choice Award	2010	Choice Comedian	Aziz Ansari	Nominated	
Writers Guild of America Awards	2017	Television: Comedy Series	Master of None (season two)	Nominated	
Young Hollywood Award	2014	Cuz You're Funny	Aziz Ansari	Nominated	

== Honorary awards ==
Organizations	Year	Award	Result	Ref.
Variety Magazine	2014	Power of Comedy Award	Honored	
Smithsonian Magazine	2016	American Ingenuity Award for Performing Arts	Honored	
Time Magazine	2016	List of the Time 100 most influential people	Honored	
Britannia Award	2017	Charlie Chaplin Award for Excellence in Comedy	Honored	
Rolling Stone	2017	Named as one of greatest stand-up comedians of all time (Note: Ranked #49)	Honored	
