= Aziz Ansari: Buried Alive =

2013 stand-up comedy special by Aziz Ansari

- Directed by: Dylan Southern; Will Lovelace
- Written by: Aziz Ansari
- Produced by: Jay Chapman
- Starring: Aziz Ansari
- Cinematography: Martin Ahlgren
- Edited by: Brenda Carlson; Aziz Ansari
- Production companies: Grandpa Pictures; 3 Arts Entertainment; New Wave Entertainment
- Distributed by: Netflix
- Release date: November 1, 2013
- Running time: 79 minutes
- Country: United States
- Language: English

Aziz Ansari: Buried Alive is a 2013 American stand-up comedy concert film written by and starring Aziz Ansari and directed by Dylan Southern and Will Lovelace, with cinematography by Martin Ahlgren. Shot at the Merriam Theater in Philadelphia during Ansari's Buried Alive Tour on April 13, 2013, it was released on November 1 of that year and became Netflix's first exclusive comedy special.

== Synopsis ==
Topics include Ansari's views on the institution of marriage, parenting, and love. The set has the theme of a wedding, with Ansari wearing a formal suit with a white boutonnière. When discussing Buried Alive in comparison to his first two specials, Intimate Moments for a Sensual Evening (2010) and Dangerously Delicious (2012), Ansari said:

This special is much, much different than my previous two. As I hit 30, my material got very personal as I grappled with the gravity of the adult world—love, marriage, babies, and more. Do I really have to deal with all that now? Are my ding dong friends really getting married and having their own children? I couldn't imagine having a kid right now. After I type this sentence, I'm gonna drink an apple juice and watch Jurassic Park—if that's a guy that's supposed to be ready to be a father, I'm very concerned. That's what Buried Alive is about.

== Production ==
The film was taped during Ansari's Buried Alive Tour across 75 cities around the world, where he performed at sold-out venues including New York's Carnegie Hall, London's Hammersmith Apollo, and Sydney's Opera House. The footage in the Netflix release was filmed during his performance at Philadelphia's Merriam Theater on April 13, 2013.

== Release ==
Buried Alive was Ansari's first Netflix special and debuted on November 1, 2013. It was released across all Netflix markets simultaneously. At the time of its release, it was Netflix's first exclusive comedy special.

== Reception ==
Buried Alive was well received by critics. Erik Adams of The A.V. Club gave it an A− and called it "a spectacularly entertaining hour-plus of stand-up, but it’s also an intriguing bit of cultural anthropology. Throughout the special, Ansari asks questions—as a character within his routines and to the members of his audience—and what he turns up is just as frequently funny as it is heartfelt and penetrating." Rolling Stone noted that it showed a more mature side of Ansari, but his material was still appealing to his younger fan base. "It feels more like social commentary rather than commentary on what it's like to be social. But old Aziz fans shouldn't fret – he still manages to slip in jokes about his younger self being molested and the notion of Xzibit raising a busload of babies."

Patrick Smith of The Daily Telegraph, who reviewed Ansari's sold-out tour stop at London's Apollo Hammersmith theatre, took notice of the comedian's outfit, writing, "Ansari's 70-minute set was none the less much like his attire: smart, sharp and slickly carried off... Buried Alive bristled with topicality and wit."

At the 2014 American Comedy Awards, Buried Alive was nominated for Comedy Special of the Year, but lost to Louis C.K.'s Oh My God.

== See also ==
- List of Netflix original stand-up comedy specials
