= Modern Romance =

Modern Romance may refer to:

- Modern Romance (film), a 1981 film written and directed by Albert Brooks
- Modern Romance (1994 film), a 1994 Hong Kong film 恋爱的天空 directed by Wong Jing 王晶
- Modern Romance: An Investigation, 2015 book by Aziz Ansari and Eric Klinenberg
- Modern Romance (band), a British pop music band formed in 1980
- "Modern Romance" (Yeah Yeah Yeahs song), from their 2003 album Fever to Tell
