= Live from Seattle =

Live from Seattle may refer to:

- Jo Koy: Live from Seattle
- The Tender Hour: Amy Ray Live from Seattle
- Live From Seattle, a Christian talk radio program
- Live from Seattle, a 2013 album by Logan Lynn
