= Eric Klinenberg =

American sociologist

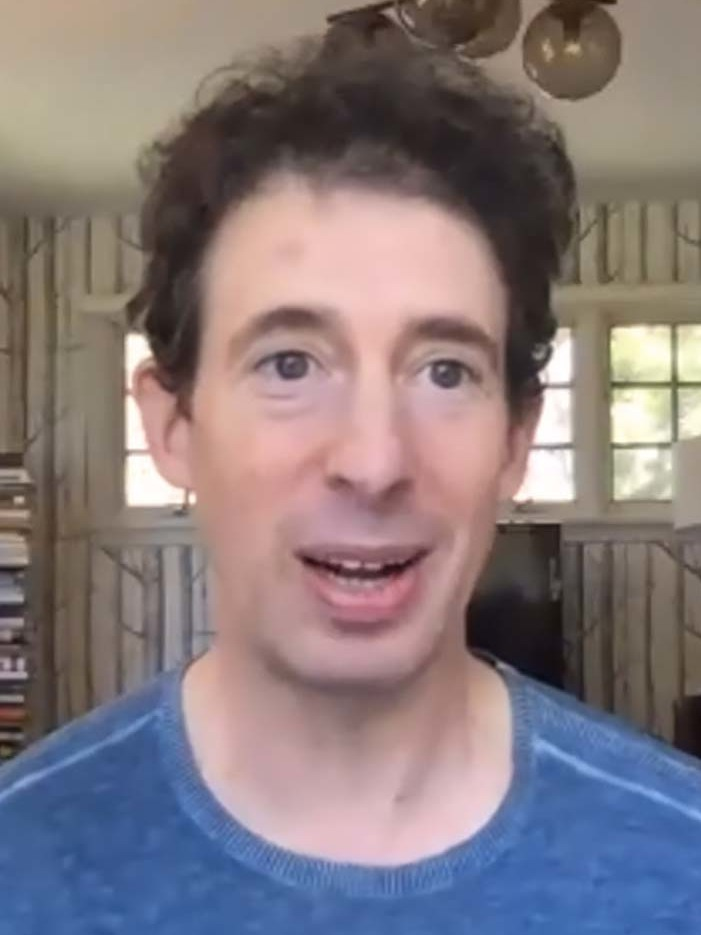
- Klinenberg in 2020
- Born: Chicago, Illinois, U.S.
- Education: Brown University (BA); University of California, Berkeley (MA, PhD)
- Scientific career
- Fields: Sociology
- Workplaces: New York University
- Website: ericklinenberg.com

Eric M. Klinenberg is an American sociologist and a scholar of urban studies, culture, and media.

He is currently Helen Gould Shepard Professor in Social Science and Director of the Institute for Public Knowledge at New York University.

Klinenberg is best known for his contributions as a public sociologist.

== Life ==
Eric Klinenberg was born in Chicago to a family of Czech-Jewish origin. He attended the Francis W. Parker School and later earned a Bachelor of Arts degree from Brown University (1993), followed by a master's degree (1997) and PhD (2000) from the University of California, Berkeley.

He is currently Professor of Sociology, Public Policy, and Media, Culture, and Communication at New York University.

In 2012, Klinenberg became director of the Institute for Public Knowledge at New York University.

In 2013, he was appointed research director of the Rebuild by Design competition.

== Publications ==
Klinenberg's first book, Heat Wave: A Social Autopsy of Disaster in Chicago, was published by the University of Chicago Press in 2002. The book is an account and analysis of the 1995 Chicago heat wave. The book won several scholarly prizes, including the American Sociological Association Robert Park Book Award, the Urban Affairs Association best book award, the British Sociological Association book prize, the Mirra Komarovsky Book Prize, and honorable mention for the C Wright Mills Award, and was a Favorite Book selection by the Chicago Tribune. A theatrical adaptation of the book premiered in Chicago in 2008.

His second book, Fighting for Air: The Battle to Control America’s Media, was called "politically passionate and intellectually serious", "a must-read for those who wonder what happened to good radio, accurate reporting and autonomous public interest".

His third book, Going Solo: The Extraordinary Rise and Surprising Appeal of Living Alone, was published in February 2012 by Penguin Press. Going Solo has been translated into several languages, including Chinese, Japanese, Korean, Russian, Turkish, and Hungarian, and has generated widespread debate. In a cover story, Time magazine featured Going Solo as "the number one idea that is changing our lives."

In 2013, Klinenberg wrote an influential article in the New Yorker on Hurricane Sandy and climate change adaptation, in which he explained the role of social infrastructure in protecting cities and communities.

Klinenberg co-wrote a book about romance with comedian Aziz Ansari, Modern Romance: An Investigation, published in June 2015.

In 2018, Klinenberg published a book on the role of social infrastructure in American culture titled Palaces for the People: How Social Infrastructure Can Help Fight Inequality, Polarization, and the Decline of Civic Life. Klinenberg analyzes the role of public spaces such as libraries, parks, gardens, and universities among other investments help to strengthen and heal communities and build social capital.

His most recent book, 2020: One City, Seven People, and the Year Everything Changed, was published in 2024. The book offers a "social autopsy" of the COVID-19 pandemic, focusing on New York City and an eclectic group of seven residents, among them a school principal, a community organizer, a bar owner, and a subway conductor, whose lives and communities were upended by disease and social disruption.

In addition to his books and scholarly articles, Klinenberg has contributed to The New York Times Magazine, Rolling Stone, The London Review of Books, The Nation, The Washington Post, Mother Jones, The Guardian, Le Monde diplomatique, Slate, Playboy, the radio program This American Life and the television program Real Time with Bill Maher.

== Select bibliography ==
=== Books ===
- Birgit Brander Rasmussen; Eric Klinenberg; Irene J. Nexica; Matt Wray, eds. (2001). The Making and Unmaking of Whiteness. Duke University Press. ISBN 978-0-8223-2740-0.
- Klinenberg, Eric (2003). Heat Wave: A Social Autopsy of Disaster in Chicago. University of Chicago Press. ISBN 978-0-226-44322-5.
- Klinenberg, Eric (2005). Cultural Production in a Digital Age (Volume 597 of Annals of the American Academy of Political and Social Science). SAGE Publications. ISBN 978-1-4129-1689-9.
- Klinenberg, Eric (2008). Fighting for Air: The Battle to Control America's Media. Macmillan. ISBN 978-0-8050-8729-1.
- Klinenberg, Eric (2012). Going Solo: The Extraordinary Rise and Surprising Appeal of Living Alone. Penguin. ISBN 978-1-101-55980-2.
- Klinenberg, Eric (2018). Palaces for the People: How Social Infrastructure can Help Fight Inequality, Polarization, and the Decline of Civic Life. Crown Publishing Group. ISBN 9781524761165
- Klinenberg, Eric (2024). 2020: One City, Seven People, and the Year Everything Changed. Knopf. ISBN 978-0-5933-1948-2.

=== Essays and journalism ===
- Klinenberg, Eric (January 7, 2013). "Dept. of Urban Planning: Adaptation". The New Yorker. Vol. 88, no. 42. pp. 32–37.
- Klinenberg, Eric (September 8, 2018). "To Restore Civil Society, Start With the Library". New York Times.
- Klinenberg, Eric, "Taking the Heat: As summers grow deadlier, Europe's cities are racing to reinvent themselves", The New Yorker, August 24 & 31, 2026, pp. 28–34.
