= Dangerously Delicious =

2012 film by Jason Woliner

- Directed by: Jason Woliner
- Written by: Aziz Ansari
- Produced by: Jay Chapman
- Starring: Aziz Ansari
- Edited by: Brenda Carlson; Daniel Earley
- Production companies: New Wave Entertainment; Comedy Dynamics
- Distributed by: Comedy Central
- Release date: March 20, 2012 (azizansari.com)
- Running time: 61 minutes
- Country: United States
- Language: English

Dangerously Delicious is a 2012 American stand-up comedy film written by and starring Aziz Ansari. It was filmed in June 2011, at the Warner Theatre in Washington, D.C. during his Dangerously Delicious Tour.

== Synopsis ==
The stand-up material included commentary such as Southern culture, racism, wasting time Googling obscure subjects (such as the box office numbers for Home Alone vs Home Alone 2 and Joe Pesci trivia) and online pornography. He also revisited subjects from his previous stand-up special, Intimate Moments for a Sensual Evening, including sharing stories about his young cousin Harris.

== Release ==
Unlike his previous special, which aired on Comedy Central, Ansari released the special directly on his website for a $5 download. He wrote, "I wanted to release it online because I saw how many people viewed clips from my last special online on sites like YouTube. I also like releasing it myself because there are no commercials, bleeps, or any of that stuff." The download package also included bonus material such as photos, posters for the Dangerously Delicious Tour, a list of places he ate while on the road, and methods to create a unique own DVD cover.

Nathan Rabin of The A.V. Club commented: "It’s a testament to Ansari’s exploding popularity that, like Louis C.K. and Jim Gaffigan before him, he’s able to cut out once-powerful middlemen like Comedy Central and HBO and release his latest special directly to fans through his website."

== Reception ==
Dangerously Delicious was well received by critics. Maureen Ryan of The Huffington Post praised Ansari's energetic delivery, writing, "Though Ansari takes on common standup topics — travel, fame, women, etc. — there's a freshness and winning curiosity to his approach: He's honestly amused or annoyed by the things that he's talking about. He's never less than fully engaged by the goofy experiences he's describing, and that keeps the special humming with energy." A reviewer for the comedy website Laugh Button called the special "hilarious" and "another step in the right direction for the comedian as he continues to refine and improve the brand that is Aziz Ansari."

In his review for The A.V. Club, Rabin writes of Ansari's increasing prominence as the comedic voice of his generation.
