= Daniel Sosa: Maleducado =

- Directed by: Marcos Bucay; Alex Díaz
- Starring: Daniel Sosa
- Country of origin: Mexico
- Original language: Spanish

Production
- Running time: 54 minutes

Original release
- Network: Netflix
- Release: June 27, 2019

Daniel Sosa: Maleducado is a Netflix stand-up comedy special by Mexican comic Daniel Sosa, his second Netflix stand-up special for Netflix following Daniel Sosa: Sosafado.

In Maleducado, directed by Marcos Bucay, Daniel Sosa talks about his childhood, Mexican traditions, a problem with the Disney movie Coco and more. It was released on June 27, 2019 on Netflix streaming.

== Cast ==
- Daniel Sosa
