= Paul T. Goldman =

- Genre: Documentary
- Directed by: Jason Woliner
- Country of origin: United States
- Original language: English
- No. of episodes: 6

Production
- Executive producers: Seth Rogen; Evan Goldberg; James Weaver; Megan Ellison; Michael Sagol; Bert Hamelick
- Producer: Tyler Ben-Amotz
- Running time: 30-63 minutes
- Production companies: Annapurna Pictures; Point Grey Pictures; Caviar; Swindle; Lionsgate Television

Original release
- Network: Peacock
- Release: January 1 – January 22, 2023

Paul T. Goldman is an American true crime documentary television miniseries directed by Jason Woliner. The show revolves around Paul Finkelman, a man who uncovers fraud and deception caused by his ex-wife. According to Vulture, the show is "an inscrutable blend of true crime and true-crime satire, documentary storytelling, and dramatized reenactments" of Finkelman's life." It premiered on January 1, 2023 on Peacock.

== Plot ==
Paul T. Goldman is loosely based on Paul Finkelman's semi-autobiographical self-published book, self-published screenplay, and self-published spinoff series. In a series of interviews, reenactments, and behind-the-scenes shots at the film set, the series describes Paul's relationship with his second wife, whom he refers to as Audrey Munson (an alias named after Audrey Munson). He believes that she was living a double life as a prostitute, dating her pimp Royce Rocco and running an international sex trafficking ring. Paul's unreliability becomes more and more apparent. According to Variety, the story of Paul's life matters less than "his aggressive self-belief and his unusual personal qualities."

== Cast and characters ==
=== Main ===
- Paul Finkelman as Paul T. Goldman, both in reenactments from an intended film adaptation of his story and the pseudonym he uses as an author

=== Recurring ===
- Melinda McGraw as Audrey Munson, Finkelman's second wife
- Christopher Stanley as Alan Elkins
- Michael Dempsey as Bob Thompson
- W. Earl Brown as Royce Rocco
- Dennis Haysbert as Agent Portman
- Paul Ben-Victor as Mob Boss
- James Remar as Lt. Newman

=== Guest ===
- Dee Wallace as Terri Jay
- Josh Pais as Ryan Sinclair
- Frank Grillo as Dan Hardwick
- Natasha Blasick as Svetlana
- Rosanna Arquette as Genevieve

== Episodes ==
No.	Title	Directed by	Original release date
1	"BCBS"	Jason Woliner	January 1, 2023
2	"Moscow"	Jason Woliner	January 1, 2023
3	"Royce"	Jason Woliner	January 1, 2023
4	"The Trial"	Jason Woliner	January 8, 2023
5	"The Chronicles"	Jason Woliner	January 15, 2023
6	"The Warrior"	Jason Woliner	January 22, 2023

== Production ==
=== Development ===
In 2009, Paul Finkelman, an insurance quoter, published Duplicity: A True Story of Crime and Deceit as Paul T. Goldman.

In 2012, Finkelman/Goldman contacted Woliner via Twitter.

In May 2022 Peacock had given a straight-to-series order to an untitled series, with Seth Rogen set to executive produce under his Point Grey Pictures banner. Director Jason Woliner had been working on the show, in some capacity, for more than a decade.

=== Casting ===
In June 2022, Rosanna Arquette, Frank Grillo, Dennis Haysbert, Melinda McGraw and Dee Wallace joined the cast of the series, in undisclosed capacities. In July 2022, Christopher Stanley, W. Earl Brown, Josh Pais, Irina Maleeva, James Remar, Paul Ben-Victor and Hilda Boulware joined the cast of the series.

== Reception ==
The show received mixed but mostly positive reviews. Hershal Pandya of Vulture described the show as "formally inventive and tonally adventurous" as Paul T. Goldman Nick of Collider called it "arguably the first can’t-miss TV show of 2023." Daniel Fienberg of Hollywood Reporter described it as "an undeniably fascinating, invariably uncomfortable piece of television." The New Yorker writes that the show is "experimental—and disturbing." They further added that "the series is an astute portrait of a man who has mastered the art of concealing his misogyny behind a bumbling benignity." The Daily Beast writes that the series blurs fiction and reality in a way that's nearly as bizarre as The Rehearsal but that Woliner's portrayal of Paul as "a colorful loon" felt "a bit mean." Variety called the series "more cruel than dazzling."

On Rotten Tomatoes, the series holds an approval rating of 76% based on 16 reviews, with an average rating of 7.00/10. The website's critical consensus reads, "This comedic docuseries-with-an-asterisk may strike some as ethically questionable and others as too opaque to fuss over, but there's no denying that Paul T. Goldman makes an unforgettable impression." On Metacritic, the series holds a rating of 63 out of 100, based on 11 critics, indicating "generally favorable reviews".
