= Heat Wave: A Social Autopsy of Disaster in Chicago =

2002 book by Eric Klinenberg

- Authors: Eric Klinenberg
- Language: English
- Subjects: Sociology
- Publisher: University of Chicago Press
- Publication date: 2002
- Publication place: United States
- Media type: Print (hardcover, Paperback)
- Pages: 328
- Awards: Foundation for the Sociology of Health & Illness' Book of the Year Prize (2003)
- ISBN: 978-0226443218

Heat Wave: A Social Autopsy of Disaster in Chicago is a 2002 book by the sociologist Eric Klinenberg, published by University of Chicago Press. The book focuses on the 1995 Chicago heat wave. The book won the 2003 Foundation for the Sociology of Health & Illness' Book of the Year Prize at the British Sociological Association's Medical Sociology Group annual conference. The book was awarded the Eastern Sociological Society's Mirra Komarovsky Book Award, the Urban Affairs Association's Best Book Award, and the Association of American Publishers' PROSE Book Award.

== Description ==
The book is an ethnographic study of the July 1995 Chicago heat wave, drawing on interviews, participant observation, and archival research. Klinenberg examines the social factors which shaped the outcomes of the heat wave, unpacking possible explanations for racial, economic, and age-based differences in heat wave related deaths.

The book followed a 1999 article in Theory and Society titled "Denaturalizing disaster: A social autopsy of the 1995 Chicago heat wave", a 2001 article in Body & Society titled "Bodies that don’t matter: Death and dereliction in Chicago", and a 2001 article in Ethnography titled "Dying alone: The social production of urban isolation".

== Reception ==
John L. Jackson Jr., in a review for the American Journal of Sociology, described the book as "a compelling sociological history that is in critical and productive conversation with current cultural analyses of catastrophe and contemporary urban sociologies of race, class, and marginality".

William Sites, writing in Social Service Review, said that the book is "thorough" and called the book's findings "mostly persuasive". Sites called the book "a very accomplished sociological case study, imaginatively conceived, tenaciously researched, and, especially in its best chapter, strikingly innovative". Sites wrote that "not all of its analytical judgements are entirely persuasive", and criticised Klinenberg for his view that the book "fails to examine whether typical death rates routinely undercount mortality rates among marginal social groups, thereby inflating the number of "excess" fatalities attributed to the heat wave". Sites also suggested that he wished the book had contained "richer ethnographic description" and "more explicit theorization" as a way to support Klinenberg's interpretations. However, Sites concluded that the book's "key insights are well supported and carefully presented".

Kieran Healy, reviewing the book in Imprints, suggested that "its reach may exceed its grasp at times" but concluded that Klinenberg's argument is "clear throughout" and "his case is at least plausible and often compelling". Healy wrote that "experts in the fields Klinenberg draws on — epidemiology, public health, social policy, urban ethnography, political economy — will find a lot to argue with" in the book.

John Wilhelm reviewed the book in the New England Journal of Medicine, describing it as "a fascinating book" and "a thought-provoking examination hat challenges everyone in medicine and public health to look beyond our training to consider sociological conditions as risk factors". Wilhelm said that "the book is not without its flaws", and criticised Klinenberg for "a politicized attack when he examines the 1995 response of Mayor Richard M. Daley and his administration." Wilhelm wrote that Klinenberg "erroneously claims that the response of the Daley administration was driven more by public-relations damage control than by a desire to understand the tragedy and prevent further deaths". Wilhelm suggested that "descriptions of the mayoral response" in the book "are similarly off-base", and said that "Klinenberg and his sources were not there". Wilhelm also wrote that "raw death totals indicate a rough parity between mortality rates in the black and white populations", contrasting this with Klinenberg's age-adjusted rates. Wilhelm had been the health commissioner of the Chicago Department of Public Health, appointed by Daley to lead a team investigating the heat wave disaster.

In letter to the editor, published in New England Journal of Medicine, Klinenberg disputed Wilhelm's review of Heat Wave. Klinenberg focused on Wilhelm's claim that the interviewees quoted in the chapters concerning Chicago's social protection programs and emergency responses were "not there". Klinenberg said that Wilhelm's statement was "not true". Wilhelm had suggested that raw death statistics were preferable to age-adjustments, Klinenberg also disputed this in his letter. Klinenberg had interviewed Wilhelm for the book, along with other city officials and employees.

=== Awards ===
- Foundation for the Sociology of Health & Illness Book of the Year Prize (2003).
- The Eastern Sociological Society's Mirra Komarovsky Book Award.
- The Urban Affairs Association's Best Book Award.
- The Association of American Publishers' PROSE Book Award.

== Theater adaptation ==
In February 2008, a play adapted from Heat Wave opened at the O'Rourke Center of Truman College. Steve Simoncic wrote the play, and it was directed by Ilesa Duncan. The artistic director was Alex Levy. The play was performed by thirteen actors. Chery Luce, in a review for Newcity Stage described the play as having "uneven direction" with "scenes that feel like bad sketch comedy" or that were "narratively redundant". Luce summarized that "overall the show doesn't feel true or genuine, or even complex".
