= Jo Koy: Comin' in Hot =

- Directed by: Shannon Hartman
- Starring: Jo Koy
- Country of origin: United States
- Original language: English

Production
- Running time: 60 minutes

Original release
- Network: Netflix
- Release: June 12, 2019

Jo Koy: Comin' in Hot is a 2019 Netflix stand-up comedy special by American comic Jo Koy, his second Netflix stand-up special for Netflix after Jo Koy: Live from Seattle. In Comin' in Hot, directed by Shannon Hartman in the Blaisdell Center's arena in Hawaii, Jo Koy talks about cultural differences, fatherhood and more.

== Cast ==
- Jo Koy

== Release ==
It was released on June 12, 2019 on Netflix streaming.
