= Aziz Ansari: Nightclub Comedian =

2022 stand-up comedy special by Aziz Ansari

- Written by: Aziz Ansari
- Directed by: Aziz Ansari
- Starring: Aziz Ansari
- Country of origin: United States
- Original language: English

Production
- Producer: Tory Lenosky
- Cinematography: Arseni Khachaturan
- Editor: Joe Giganti
- Running time: 29 minutes
- Production company: Oh Brudder Productions

Original release
- Network: Netflix
- Release: January 25, 2022

Aziz Ansari: Nightclub Comedian is an American stand-up comedy special by Aziz Ansari. The special is directed by Aziz Ansari and premiered on January 25, 2022 on Netflix. In it, Ansari talks about the ongoing COVID-19 pandemic's impact and the phenomenon of vaccine hesitancy in celebrities such as Aaron Rodgers and Nicki Minaj, replacing his smartphone with a flip phone to control his use of social media, celebrity sponsorships of products, and how privilege and the attention economy keep people fleetingly interested in a cycle of internet scandals.

== Background ==
External videos
- "Aaron Rodgers and Anti Vaxxers"; A clip from Aziz Ansari: Nightclub Comedian.

Ansari's previous special, titled Aziz Ansari: Right Now, premiered on Netflix on July 9, 2019, in which he addressed his previous sexual assault allegations.

Ansari had performed at the Comedy Cellar, the venue for the special, almost two decades prior to the filming of Nightclub Comedian. Scenes from this performance early in his career appear in the opening and closing shots of the special.

== Production ==
Marketed as an "intimate surprise gig", the special was filmed at the Comedy Cellar in New York City in December 2021 without prior announcement of the performance to the venue's guests. The special was directed by Aziz Ansari and was filmed by Ambrose Eng, Derek Sexton Horani, Yuya Kudo, and Danilo Parra, who were seated in the audience.

Executive producers for the special are Aziz Ansari, Youree Henley, Dave Becky, Dave Miner, and Sharon Jackson. Production companies involved with this special are Oh Brudder Productions.

== Release ==
On January 11, 2022, Netflix announced a new special.

Aziz Ansari: Nightclub Comedian was released by Netflix on January 25, 2022.

== Reception ==
Nightclub Comedian received mixed positive reviews. As of May 2026, 80% of the 5 reviews compiled on Rotten Tomatoes are positive, with an average rating of 5.0/10. Brian Logan of The Guardian gave the special three out of five stars. Logan described the act as "downbeat and cynical", and argued that it was "enriched... with colours" of Ansari's feelings about his previous sexual assault allegations. He also praised Ansari's social commentary on smartphones and described it as a "strong closer". Rohan Naahar of The Indian Express described the special as a "moving time capsule of life in the midst of global upheaval", giving it a 4/5.
