= Jason Woliner =

American comedian (born 1980)

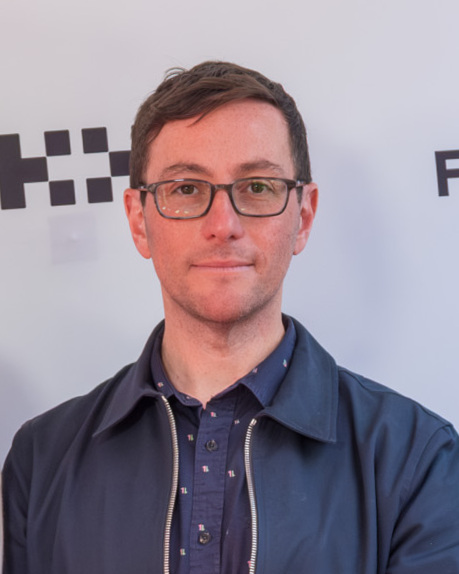
- Woliner in 2026
- Born: June 1, 1980 (age 46); New York City, U.S.
- Occupations: Director, writer, actor
- Years active: 1989–present
- Known for: Human Giant; Borat Subsequent Moviefilm

Jason Woliner (born June 1, 1980) is an American director, writer and actor. He is best known for being in the sketch comedy show Human Giant, as a non-performing member who instead worked behind the scenes as director.

== Early life and education ==
Woliner attended Pelham Memorial High School and for higher study at Sarah Lawrence College from 1998 to 2000 before dropping out to pursue a directing career. His first acting credit was at age nine, appearing in Weekend at Bernie's.

== Career ==
After leaving school, Woliner began making films and videos, both on his own and with comedians in New York, which led to the formation of Human Giant. The first three Human Giant videos ("Shutterbugs", "Illusionators", and the "Shittiest Mixtape Boombox Blast") caught the eyes of executives at MTV, who offered the group a pilot. The show ran for two seasons.

He was the non-performing member of the comedy group Human Giant and directed the bulk of their output. After that, he directed, co-wrote, and acted as showrunner on the cult Adult Swim series Eagleheart starring Chris Elliott. Woliner has directed episodes of Fox's The Last Man on Earth, NBC's Parks and Recreation, and Comedy Central's Nathan for You and Jon Benjamin Has a Van, among others. In 2020, he directed Borat Subsequent Moviefilm.

He has collaborated with writer-performer Brett Gelman on a series of horror/comedy specials for Adult Swim. The first of these, titled Dinner with Friends with Brett Gelman and Friends, aired in April 2014, and the second special, titled Dinner with Family with Brett Gelman and Brett Gelman's Family, aired in February 2015. The third special, Brett Gelman's Dinner in America, aired in July 2016. Woliner and Gelman wrote the specials together; Gelman stars and Woliner directed.

In 2020, he directed the comedy film Borat Subsequent Moviefilm, and won a Golden Globe for Best Motion Picture with Sacha Baron Cohen. In 2023, Woliner directed Paul T. Goldman, a hybrid documentary-comedy series for Peacock.

== Filmography ==
=== Film ===
Films directed, written, or produced by Jason Woliner
| Year | Title | Director | Writer | Producer |
|---|---|---|---|---|
| 2006 | Other Music | Yes | No | No |
| 2007 | An Evening with P. Oswalt | Yes | No | No |
| 2014 | Food Club | Yes | Yes | Yes |
| 2020 | Borat Subsequent Moviefilm | Yes | No | No |

Acting roles by Jason Woliner
| Year | Title | Role |
|---|---|---|
| 1989 | Weekend at Bernie's | Bratty Kid |
| 1990 | Shining Time Station: 'Tis a Gift | Matt |
| 1996 | Bullet | Buck Teeth |
| 2014 | Food Club | Captain Woliner |
| 2026 | Primetime | 800lord_12 |

Special thanks

- Origin Story (2018)
- Mister America (2019)

=== Television ===
Television work by Jason Woliner
| Year | Title | Director | Writer | Producer | Editor | Notes |
|---|---|---|---|---|---|---|
| 1989–1991 | Shining Time Station | No | No | No | No | Matt Jones; 22 episodes |
| 2005–2010 | Shutterbugs | Yes | Yes | Yes | No | 11 episodes |
| 2007–2008 | Human Giant | Yes | Yes | Yes | Yes | 14 episodes |
| 2009 | The Electric Company | Yes | No | No | No | Episode: "Scent of a Human" |
| 2009 | Delocated | No | No | No | Yes | Episode: "Pilot" |
| 2009 | Raaaaaaaandy! | Yes | Yes | No | Yes | 3 episodes |
| 2009–2010 | Parks and Recreation | Yes | No | No | No | 3 episodes |
| 2010 | Funny or Die Presents | Yes | Yes | Yes | Yes | 6 episodes |
| 2010 | Players | Yes | No | Yes | No | 10 episodes |
| 2011 | Saturday Night Live | Yes | Yes | No | No | Episode: "Ed Helms/Paul Simon" |
| 2011 | Jon Benjamin Has a Van | Yes | No | No | No | 2 episodes |
| 2011 | Eagleheart | Yes | Yes | Yes | No | 25 episodes |
| 2012 | New Girl | Yes | No | No | No | Episode: "Menzies" |
| 2013 | Good Morning Tri-State | Yes | No | No | No | Television short |
| 2013 | Nathan for You | Yes | No | No | No | 2 episodes |
| 2014 | Dinner with Friends with Brett Gelman and Friends | Yes | Yes | No | No | Television short |
| 2014 | Tim & Eric's Bedtime Stories | No | Yes | No | No | 7 episodes |
| 2015 | The Jack and Triumph Show | No | No | Yes | No | 6 episodes |
| 2015 | W/ Bob & David | Yes | No | No | No | 4 episodes |
| 2015 | Master of None | No | Yes | Yes | No | 10 episodes |
| 2015–2018 | The Last Man on Earth | Yes | No | No | No | 12 episodes |
| 2019 | What We Do in the Shadows | Yes | No | No | No | 2 episodes |
| 2019 | Trade Show Show | Yes | No | No | No | 6 episodes |
| 2023 | Paul T. Goldman | Yes | Yes | Yes | No | 6 episodes |
| 2024 | St. Denis Medical | Yes | No | No | No | Episode: "Salamat You Too" |
| 2025 | Adults | Yes | No | No | No | 2 episodes |
| 2025 | The Paper | Yes | No | No | No | Episode: "Churnalism" |

TV specials by Jason Woliner
| Year | Title | Director | Writer | Producer | Editor |
|---|---|---|---|---|---|
| 2009 | Patton Oswalt: My Weakness Is Strong | Yes | No | No | Yes |
| 2010 | Intimate Moments for a Sensual Evening | Yes | No | No | Yes |
| 2010 | MTV Movie & TV Awards | Yes | Yes | Yes | No |
| 2011 | Patton Oswalt: Finest Hour | Yes | No | No | No |
| 2012 | Aziz Ansari: Dangerously Delicious | Yes | No | No | No |
