= Jo Koy =

American comedian (born 1971)

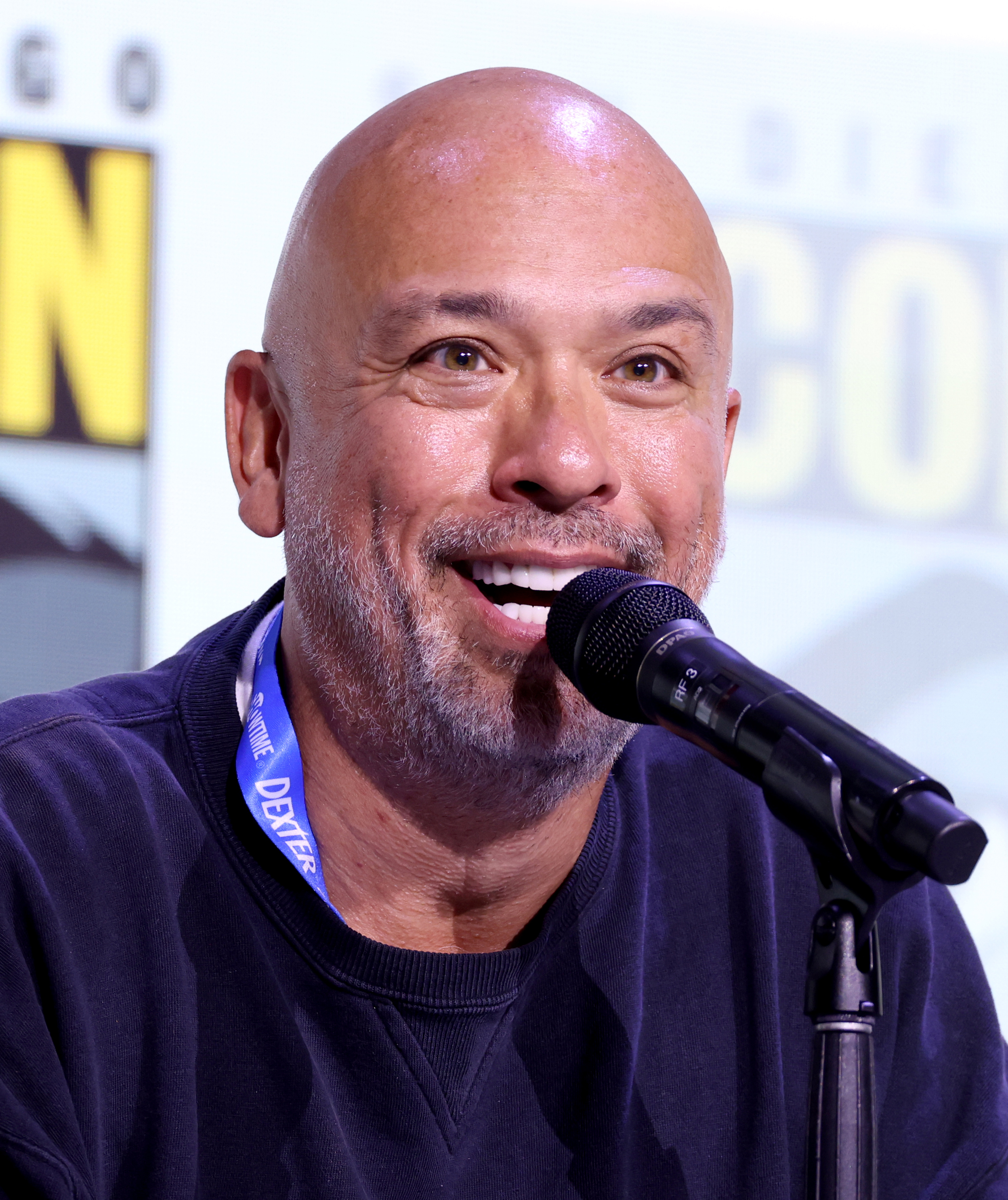
- Koy in 2025
- Born: Joseph Glenn Herbert; June 2, 1971 (age 55); Misawa Air Base, Misawa, Japan
- Education: University of Nevada, Las Vegas
- Spouse: Angie King (div. 2013)
- Children: 1

Comedy career
- Years active: 1989–present
- Medium: Stand-up; television; film
- Genres: Observational comedy; black comedy; insult comedy; surreal humor; satire
- Subjects: Asian American culture; everyday life; pop culture; current events; gender differences; human behavior; human sexuality
- Website: jokoy.com

Joseph Glenn Herbert (born June 2, 1971), known professionally as Jo Koy, is an American stand-up comedian and actor. He was a frequent panelist on E!'s late night show Chelsea Lately, and he has since had a total of six comedy specials released by Comedy Central and Netflix. In 2024, Koy hosted the 81st Golden Globe Awards.

== Early life and education ==
Koy was born at Misawa Air Base in Misawa, Japan, on June 2, 1971. His father, John C. Herbert, was an American in the United States Air Force stationed in Japan when he married Koy's Filipina mother, Josie Harrison. His stepfather, Fredrick Harrison, also helped raise him. The family soon moved to Tacoma, Washington, where he attended Henry Foss High School. After graduating high school in 1989, the family moved to Las Vegas to be near his ailing grandmother. Koy enrolled in the University of Nevada, Las Vegas, but dropped out to pursue stand-up comedy.

Koy has said that his stage name comes from a nickname his family gave him when he was growing up. He said that while talking to his cousin about making a stage name, his aunt called him to come to dinner, shouting "Jo Ko, eat!" (Ko means "my" in Tagalog, so Jo Ko means "my Jo"), which he misheard as "Koy".

== Career ==
In 2019, Beat Magazine described Koy as having performed comedy for 30 years. Soon then moved to open mic nights, before landing regular gigs.

The regular appearances included Catch a Rising Star at the MGM Grand Hotel and Casino in Las Vegas. After that, he rented the Huntridge Theater, also in Las Vegas, and went door to door to sell tickets to his comedy shows.

Koy's appearances as a regular guest at Chelsea Handler's Chelsea Lately was reported by David Tusing of the Gulf News as having given "him prominence in the US". (Koy appeared on that late night show regularly.

Koy hosted the weekly podcast The Koy Pond with Jo Koy, where he "riff[s] on various topics with other fellow comedians". The first episode was released in 2016 and the final episode was released in 2021.

In 2019, Koy released another Netflix special, Jo Koy: Comin' in Hot, which was filmed before a crowd of about 8,000 at the Neal S. Blaisdell Arena in Honolulu, Hawaii. As of September 2019, plans were being made to have Koy's next Netflix special, to be based on his 2020 Just Kidding world tour, recorded at the Blaisdell as well. On February 23, 2019, Koy performed two shows on stage at the Wheeler Opera House, Aspen, Colorado, for the closing night of Aspen Laugh Festival. Joy's subsequent 2020 Just Kidding World Tour took him to the United Arab Emirates, Australia, New Zealand, and the Philippines.

On June 12, 2020, Netflix released Jo Koy: In His Elements, a comedy special featuring Filipino American comedians, DJs, and B-boys. On July 28, 2022, Koy, alongside film producer Dan Lin appeared in the Rise for Comedy festival, where they raised a $75,000 donation to the nonprofit Search to Involve Pilipino Americans (SIPA).

Koy was a regular guest on the podcast, The Adam Carolla Show.

In 2025, Koy participated in the Riyadh Comedy Festival. Joey Shea, Saudi Arabia researcher at Human Rights Watch, said in a statement that the Saudi government is using the comedy festival to whitewash its human rights abuses.

=== 2023 Golden Globe Awards ===
On December 21, 2023, Koy was announced as host of the 81st Golden Globe Awards. Koy's monologue as host of the 81st Golden Globe Awards was met with criticism from viewers and critics. Chelsey Sanchez of Bazaar described his monologue as "awkward" and "distasteful". Shirley Li of The Atlantic wrote that "practically every joke failed to land, mostly because the punchlines were dated or obvious". Variety's television critic Alison Herman panned Koy as "woefully unqualified" to be an awards show host. Koy was met with criticism for putting blame on his writers during the monologue, coming after a lengthy 2023 Writers Guild of America strike. Justin Curto of Vulture noted, that when some of his jokes fell flat, Koy "immediately threw his writers under the bus. ... He yelled. 'Yo, shut up. You're kidding me, right. Slow down. I wrote some of these, and they're the ones you're laughing at.'"

Hershal Pandya of Vulture wrote: "Comedians have tanked at the Golden Globes before but none quite as spectacularly as Koy." Marlow Stern of Rolling Stone noted that many of Koy's jokes drew "groans" and "boos" from the audience. Among the barbs that drew the most ire were sexist jokes involving the Barbie movie and Taylor Swift, as well as uncomfortable jokes directed at Meryl Streep and Robert De Niro. Nicole Sperling of The New York Times, who was in the audience that night, wrote, "Never seen an audience rebel against an emcee so quickly" and cited a prominent director describing Koy as a "disaster". Viewers online noted stunned reactions from the crowd from people such as Selena Gomez, Helen Mirren and Harrison Ford.

Koy responded to the criticism in an interview with Good Morning America, admitting, "I'd be lying if I said the backlash didn't hurt", but also admitted, "I had fun. You know, it was a moment that I'll always remember. Hosting is just a tough gig. Yes, I'm a stand-up comic but that hosting position it's a different style. I kind of went in and did the writer's thing. We had 10 days to write this monologue. It was a crash course. I feel bad, but I got to still say I loved what I did." Fellow comedians such as Steve Martin, Whoopi Goldberg and Kevin Hart, as well as radio host Howard Stern, expressed sympathy towards Koy, with many of them arguing that the job of a comedian is not always easy, especially when hosting an awards show.

== Influences ==
Koy has named Bill Cosby, Eddie Murphy, Robin Williams, Billy Crystal, Whoopi Goldberg, Chris Rock, and Steve Martin as his comedy influences. In 2022, Blogtalk with MJ Racadio named him one of the "75 Most Influential Filipino-Americans".

== Personal life ==
Koy was previously married to Filipino-American singer Angie King. Koy has a son, Joseph Jr., from his marriage to King, born at Cedars-Sinai Hospital, in April 2003. His mother's sister, Evelyn Magluyan, is the first Filipino gymnast to represent the Philippines in the Olympics.

For a time, around the production of his Comin' in Hot special, Koy was described as considering Hawaii as "a second home". As of 2023, Koy lived in Los Angeles, and Koy's son lived between the homes of his father and mother, which are "one block down from each other."

Koy's stepfather, retired Army Sergeant Fredrick Harrison, died in 2023, and was eulogized by Koy, who said, "He served 20 years ... received 2 Purple Hearts, 2 Bronze Stars and a CIB [Combat Infantryman Badge] badge ... [of which] he was most proud. ... He was a hero. My hero."

Koy and Chelsea Handler were in a relationship between 2021 and 2022.

As of January 2023, Koy was described as being a practitioner of Brazilian jiu-jitsu. In 2023, Koy got his arm tattooed by mambabatok Wilma "Ate Wamz" Gaspili at Igorot's Charm Cafe across Baguio Botanical Garden.

== Filmography ==
=== Film ===
Year	Title	Role	Notes
2005	Virginia	Chester Blind	
2018	Wake.	Peter Lewis	
2020	Anastasia: Once Upon a Time	Vladimir Lenin	
2022	Easter Sunday	Joe Valencia	
2023	Haunted Mansion	Daytime Bartender	
2023	The Monkey King	Benbo (voice)	
2023	Leo	Coach Kimura (voice)	
2023	Reindeer in Here	Hawk (voice)	Short
2024	The Tiger's Apprentice	Rooster (voice)	
2026	Forgotten Island	Datu (voice)	
2027	The Last Resort †		

=== Television ===
Year	Title	Role	Notes
2001	Showtime at the Apollo	Himself	Episode: "Episode #15.6"
2005	I Love the '90s: Part Deux	Himself	Episode: "1993"
2005	ComicView	Himself	Episode: "Episode #14.6"
2005	Party @ the Palms	Himself	Episode: "Episode #1.2"
2006	Laffapalooza	Himself	Episode: "Laffapalooza Volume 7"
2008	Comedy Central Presents	Himself	Episode: "Jo Koy"
2008	I Love the New Millennium	Himself	Recurring Guest
2008	truTV Presents: World's Dumbest...	Himself	Recurring Guest
2008	The World Stands Up	Himself	Episode: "Episode #5.2" & "#5.13"
2009	The International Sexy Ladies Show	Himself	Main Cast
2009	Live at Gotham	Himself/Host	Episode: "Jo Koy"
2009–14	Chelsea Lately	Himself/Panelist	Recurring Panelist: Season 4–8
2010	Just for Laughs	Himself	Episode: "Episode #2.5"
2011	Stand Up Live Presents	Himself	Episode: "Stand Up Live Premiere with Jo Koy"
2012	Hollywood Uncensored with Sam Rubin	Himself/Panelist	Recurring Panelist
2012–13	Big Morning Buzz Live	Himself/Panelist	Guest Panelist: Season 4 & 7
2013	Gotham Comedy Live	Himself/Host	Episode: "Jo Koy"
2013	Family Tools	Berrick	Episode: "Pilot"
2015	World's Funniest	Himself/Panelist	Episode: "Gravity: It Kinda Sucks"
2015	The Nightly Show with Larry Wilmore	Himself/Panelist	Episode: "Racist Dr Seuss & Nebraska Death Penalty"
2017	Idiotest	Himself	Episode: "Episode #4.1"
2017	@midnight	Himself	Episode: "April 27, 2017"
2017	Sean in the Wild	Himself	Episode: "Filipino Food 101 with Jo Koy"
2018	Curry Shop	Himself	Episode: "Jo Koy Gives a Filipino Food Crash Course"
2019	Treat Yourself	Himself	Episode: "Treat Yourself: Jo Koy"
2019	Dressing Funny	Himself	Episode: "Jo Koy Bets Tan France $20 That He Can't Wear Stripes"
2019–20	Lights Out with David Spade	Himself/Panelist	Recurring Panelist
2020	Cooked with Cannabis	Himself	Episode: "Grilled Backyard BBQ"
2020	Mr. Iglesias	Bob	Episode: "Food for Thought"
2021	Metal Shop Masters	Himself/Host	Main Host
2022	Phat Tuesdays: The Era Of Hip Hop Comedy	Himself	Main Guest
2022	Celebrity Family Feud	Himself/Contestant	Episode: "Episode #9.4"
2022	Family Feud	Himself	Episode: "Jo Koy Special"
2022–23	The $100,000 Pyramid	Himself/Celebrity Player	Episode: "Episode #6.7" & "#6.16"
2023	Awkwafina Is Nora from Queens	Bob (voice)	Episode: "Love & Order"
2024	81st Golden Globe Awards	Himself/Host	Main Host
2024	Hailey's On It!	Eddie Denoga (voice)	Episode: "The Biggest Luger"

=== Stand-up specials ===
Year	Title	Role	Notes
2009	Don't Make Him Angry	Himself	Comedy Central Stand-Up Special
2012	Lights Out	Himself	Comedy Central Stand-Up Special
2017	Live from Seattle	Himself	Netflix Original Comedy Special
2019	Comin' in Hot	Himself	Netflix Original Comedy Special
2020	In His Elements	Himself	Netflix Original Variety Special
2022	Live from the LA Forum	Himself	Netflix Original Comedy Special
2024	Live from Brooklyn	Himself	Netflix Original Comedy Special
2026	Blue in the Face	Himself	Netflix Original Comedy Special
