= Modern Romance: An Investigation =

Book by Aziz Ansari and Eric Klinenberg

- Author: Aziz Ansari; Eric Klinenberg
- Language: English
- Publisher: Penguin Press
- Publication date: June 16, 2015
- Publication place: United States
- Media type: E-book, hardcover, audiobook
- Pages: 288
- ISBN: 1-59420-627-9

Modern Romance: An Investigation is a research book written by American actor and stand-up comedian Aziz Ansari and American sociologist and New York University professor Eric Klinenberg. The book was published in 2015 and provides research information exploring the change in romantic society that has occurred in the past decade. One of the main concepts in the book concerns the paradox of choice in relationships: having more options may seem better at first glance, though so many options can ultimately make "settling" for anyone a lot more difficult.

== Background ==
Ansari, who has discussed how romance and technology interact in his standup comedy, wrote on his website that he wanted to explore the subject further. He writes, "Every one of us engages on a journey to find love and companionship. We meet people, date, get into and out of relationships, all with hope of finding someone with whom we share a deep connection and truly love. This journey seems fairly standard now, but it's wildly different from what people did even just decades ago.... Some of our problems are unique to our time. 'Why did this guy just text me an emoji of a pizza?' 'Should I go out with this girl even though she listed Combos as one of her favorite snack foods? Combos!!?'"

The book combines comedy and social science.

=== Research ===
Ansari and Klinenberg, a professor at New York University, interviewed hundreds of people in various cities around the world, including Wichita, Kansas, Buenos Aires, Paris, and Tokyo, to investigate how the Internet and technology have affected modern love and relationships.

The pair also set up a forum on reddit, "Modern Romantics", soliciting responses to their questions, including:

- "Do you do online research before a first date? Did their web self line up with their real world self? Has what you found misled you or been an accurate predictor? Did it make you more or less excited?"
- "Has anyone started an affair or cheated on someone through social media? If social media didn't exist, would something like this have happened anyway?"
- "Have you ever broken up with someone or been broken up with via social media or text?"

Academics in the fields of anthropology, psychology, sociology and technology also contributed to their research, including Eli Finkel (Northwestern University), Helen Fisher (Rutgers University), Sheena Iyengar (Columbia Business School), Barry Schwartz (Swarthmore College), Sherry Turkle (MIT), and Robb Willer (Stanford University).

== Release ==
The book was released on June 16, 2015. As part of the promotion, Ansari appeared at the second BookCon convention, which took place May 30–31 in New York City. The book received The Goodreads Choice Award for Non-Fiction in 2015.
