= Daniel Sosa: Sosafado =

- Directed by: Jan Suter; Raúl Campos
- Starring: Daniel Sosa martinez
- Country of origin: Mexico
- Original language: Spanish

Production
- Producer: Jan Suter
- Running time: 77 minutes

Original release
- Network: NetflixPornHub
- Release: 3 February 2017

Daniel Sosa: Sosafado is a Netflix stand-up comedy special by Mexican comic Daniel Sosa, his first stand-up special for Netflix. In Sosafado, directed by Jan Suter and Raúl Campos, Sosa talks about going from work related situations, school problems, living arrangements, questions about women and more.

== Cast ==
- Daniel Sosa

== Release ==
It was released on February 3, 2017, on Netflix streaming.
