= Aziz Ansari: Right Now =

2019 stand-up comedy special by Aziz Ansari

- Written by: Aziz Ansari
- Directed by: Spike Jonze
- Starring: Aziz Ansari
- Country of origin: United States
- Original language: English

Production
- Producers: Jason Baum; Spike Jonze
- Cinematography: Autumn Durald
- Editor: Jeff Buchanan
- Running time: 65 minutes
- Production companies: 3 Arts Entertainment; Pulse Films; Oh Brudder Productions

Original release
- Network: Netflix
- Release: July 9, 2019

Aziz Ansari: Right Now (stylized as Aziz Ansari: RIGHT NOW) is an American stand-up comedy special by Aziz Ansari. The special is directed by Spike Jonze and premiered on July 9, 2019 on Netflix. In it, Ansari talks about the sexual misconduct controversy he was involved in the previous year, his relationship with his grandmother and parents, white people who want to appear anti-racist, how the threshold of acceptable behaviour has changed over the past decade, and the sexual misconduct of R. Kelly and Michael Jackson. The special received positive critical reception.

== Background ==
External videos
- "White People Love Crazy Rich Asians"; A clip from Aziz Ansari: RIGHT NOW.

Ansari's previous special, titled Aziz Ansari: Live at Madison Square Garden, premiered on Netflix on March 6, 2015. In January 2018, a Babe.net article was published in which an anonymous woman using the pseudonym "Grace" accused Ansari of sexual misconduct on a date they went on in September 2017. After Ansari published a response to Grace, he reduced his public profile. In late 2018, he began performing a stand-up tour entitled "Working Out New Material".

== Production ==
The special was filmed at the Brooklyn Academy of Music on May 16, 17 and 18 in 2019. The special was directed by Spike Jonze and was mostly filmed on Kodak 16 mm film with Jonze operating an up-close camera on stage.

Executive producers for the special are Aziz Ansari, Aniz Ansari (Aziz's brother), Amanda Adelson, Thomas Benksi, Marisa Clifford, and Isabel Davis. Production companies involved with this special are 3 Arts Entertainment, Pulse Films, and Oh Brudder Productions.

== Release ==
On July 1, 2019, Ansari announced a new special on Twitter, and a clip from the special was released on July 8, 2019.

Aziz Ansari: Right Now was released by Netflix on July 9, 2019.

== Reception ==
Right Now has received favorable reviews. As of October 2021, 84% of the 31 reviews compiled on Rotten Tomatoes are positive, with an average rating of 7.2/10. The website's critics consensus reads: "Aziz Ansari balances sharp social commentary with just enough earnest introspection to craft a special that, while not without its baggage, shows how far the comedian has come - and how far he may still have to go." Steve Bennett of Chortle rated the special 3.5 stars out of five, noting that it was informed by Ansari's "experience of having his reputation so thoroughly raked over", and that Jonze's "very close up" shots "tried to humanise him more". Bennett said that Ansari "can be a little self-satisfied" but that the special has "probably done enough to repair his fractured reputation". Ed Power of The Telegraph gave the special three out of five stars, calling it "serviceable". Power praised Ansari's concluding words but criticised a lack of depth to Ansari's "perfectly obvious" observations. He notes that Jonze's filming style and Ansari's appearance contributing to a "hint at inner self-doubt" which is "welcome". Sampada Sharma of The Indian Express lauded the special as a "great mix of comedy and emotional storytelling", but commented that there was a "slight tinge of guilt" to watching the special after the sexual misconduct controversy.

== Awards and nominations ==
Award nominations for Aziz Ansari: Right Now
Year	Award	Category	Nominated work	Result
2020	Grammy Award	Best Comedy Album	Aziz Ansari, Right Now	Nominated
