= Aziz Ansari =

American actor and comedian (born 1983)

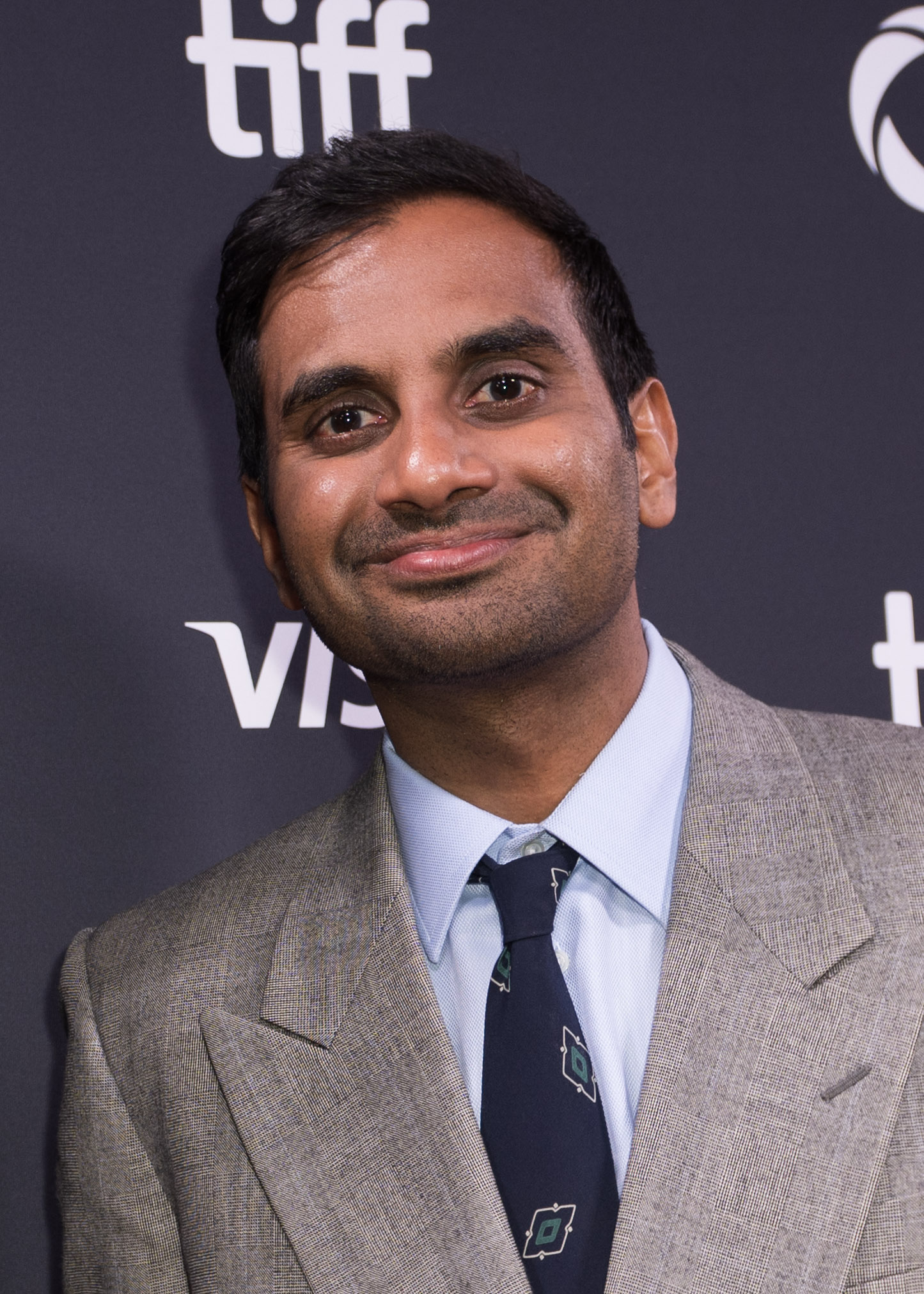
- Ansari in 2025
- Born: Aziz Ismail Ansari; February 23, 1983 (age 43); Columbia, South Carolina, U.S.
- Education: New York University (BBA)
- Spouse: Serena Skov Campbell (m. 2022)

Comedy career
- Years active: 2004–present
- Medium: Stand-up; television; film; books
- Genres: Observational comedy; blue comedy; sketch comedy; surreal humor; satire
- Subjects: Indian culture; everyday life; current events; popular culture; human interaction; human sexuality; racism; self-deprecation
- Website: azizansari.com

Aziz Ismail Ansari (/ɑːnˈsɑːri/ ahn-SAR-ee; born February 23, 1983) is an American actor, comedian, and filmmaker. He played Tom Haverford on the NBC series Parks and Recreation (2009–2015) and created and starred in the Netflix series Master of None (2015–2021), for which he won several acting and writing awards, including two Emmys and a Golden Globe, which was the first award received by an Asian American actor for acting on television.

Ansari began performing comedy in New York City, while a student at NYU Stern in 2000. He later co-created and starred in the MTV sketch comedy show Human Giant, after which he had acting roles in a number of feature films. From 2009 to 2015, Ansari played Tom Haverford in the NBC sitcom Parks and Recreation. In 2015, Ansari co-created, and starred in the first two seasons of Netflix's critically acclaimed series Master of None, for which he also served as a writer and director.

As a stand-up comedian, Ansari released his first comedy special, Intimate Moments for a Sensual Evening, in January 2010 on Comedy Central Records. He continues to perform stand-up on tour and on Netflix. His first book, Modern Romance: An Investigation, was released in June 2015. In July 2019, Ansari released his fifth comedy special Aziz Ansari: Right Now, which was nominated for a Grammy Award for Best Comedy Album. In 2021, Netflix released Master of None Presents: Moments in Love, which Ansari wrote and directed. The following year he released his comedy special Aziz Ansari: Nightclub Comedian on Netflix.

== Early life and education ==
Aziz Ismail Ansari was born in Columbia, South Carolina, United States, to Muslim immigrants from Tamil Nadu. Ansari was raised Muslim but has claimed to be non-religious. His mother, Fatima, is a medical office worker and his father, Shoukath, is a gastroenterologist.

His younger sister, Nafeez, died in childhood from Hurler syndrome. Ansari has a younger brother, Aniz Adam Ansari, who is seven years his junior. Aniz is also a writer, and co-wrote an episode of Master of None with his brother.

Ansari grew up in Bennettsville. As a child, he skipped the first and second grade in elementary school. He attended Marlboro Academy and the South Carolina Governor's School for Science and Mathematics in Hartsville.

He graduated from the New York University Stern School of Business in 2004, with a Bachelor of Business degree in marketing. While at NYU Stern, Ansari spent a semester in London, England, where he was roommates with future New York State Assemblyman, Micah Lasher.

== Career ==
=== Early career ===
Ansari frequently performed at the Upright Citizens Brigade Theatre, as well as weekly shows such as Invite Them Up. In 2005, Rolling Stone included him in their annual "Hot List" as their choice for the "Hot Standup", and he won the Jury Award for "Best Standup" at HBO's 2006 U.S. Comedy Arts Festival in Aspen, Colorado. During this time, he worked a day job at an digital marketing company.

=== Human Giant ===
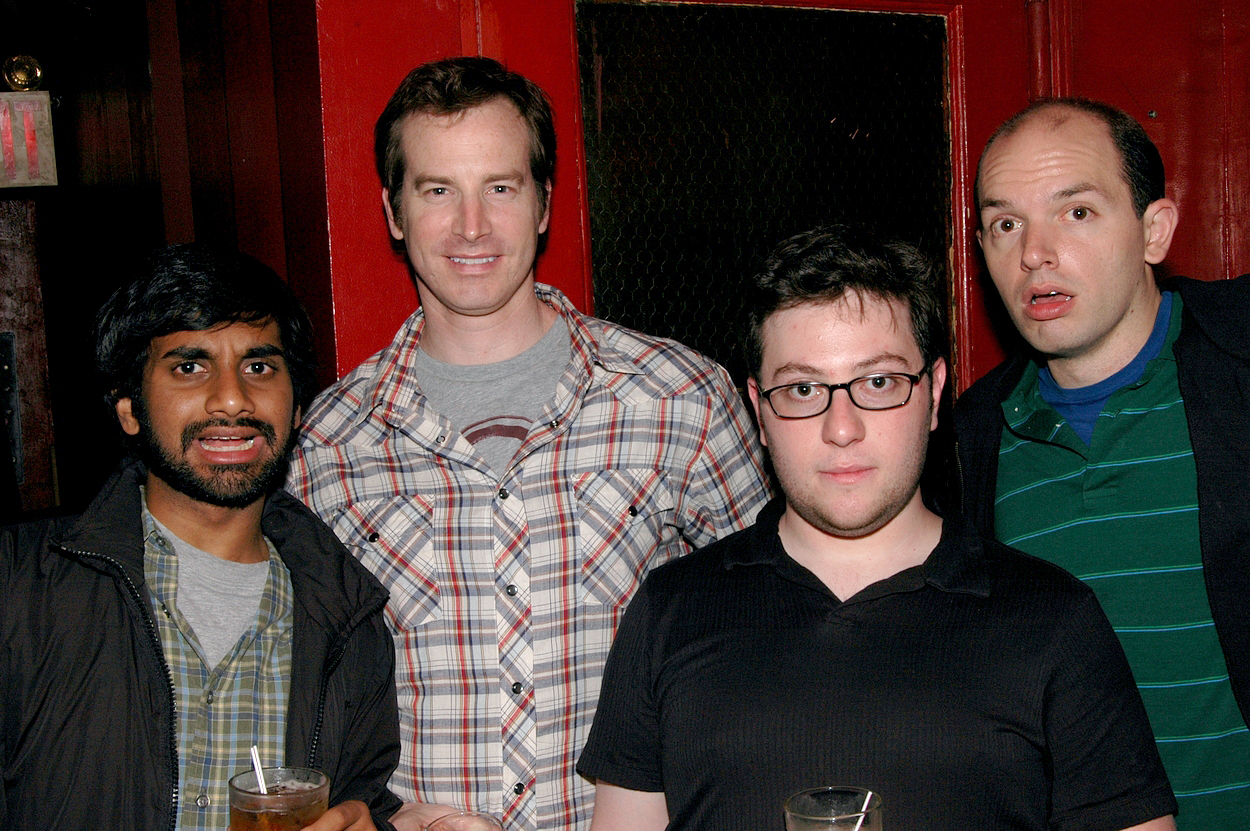
From left to right, Human Giant's Aziz Ansari, Rob Huebel, Jason Woliner, and Paul Scheer in May 2007

Around the summer of 2005, Ansari began collaborating with fellow comedians Rob Huebel and Paul Scheer (both from the improv troupe Respecto Montalban), as well as director Jason Woliner to make short films. The first series created by the group was Shutterbugs, which followed Huebel and Ansari as cutthroat child talent agents. This was followed up by the Illusionators, which starred Ansari and Scheer as Criss Angel–style goth magicians. In mid-2006, MTV greenlit Human Giant, a sketch series from the group, which debuted April 5, 2007. The show ran for two seasons and the group was offered a third season, but they opted to pursue other opportunities. Ansari had been offered the role of Tom Haverford on Parks and Recreation, and since the members wrote everything together, they decided, as Scheer told Vulture, "it would be better if we walked away as friends instead of burn out on each other and the show."

=== Parks and Recreation ===
In June 2008, Ansari was announced as the first cast hire for NBC's comedy Parks and Recreation. The show debuted in April 2009 with Ansari playing one of the main characters, Tom Haverford, for the show's seven seasons. Ansari's performance was praised by critics, including Entertainment Weekly, TV Guide, and Yahoo! TV, which placed him in the No. 1 spot on its list of "TV MVPS".

=== Master of None ===
Starting in November 2015, Ansari starred as Dev Shah in the Netflix original series Master of None, which he created and wrote with Parks and Recreation writer Alan Yang. James Poniewozik of The New York Times called the show "the year's best comedy straight out of the gate" and praised its genre-crossing appeal. The show initially ran for two seasons. Production work began on a third season in early 2020 in London, but was put on hold because of the COVID-19 pandemic. By January 2021, production was getting ready to resume, with Naomi Ackie joining the cast. The season was released on May 23, 2021.

Ansari's performance in the show earned him a nomination for the Golden Globe Award for Best Actor – Television Series Musical or Comedy. The series earned four Emmy nominations in 2016: Outstanding Comedy Series, Outstanding Writing for a Comedy Series for Ansari and Yang, and Outstanding Directing for a Comedy Series and Outstanding Lead Actor in a Comedy Series for Ansari; Yang and Ansari won the Emmy for Outstanding Writing for a Comedy Series for the episode "Parents". Yang and Ansari were also honored with a Peabody Award in May 2016 for the series.

In 2018 Ansari won a Golden Globe for best actor in a TV comedy for the show; this made him the first Asian-American actor to win a Golden Globe for acting in television.

=== Other television work ===
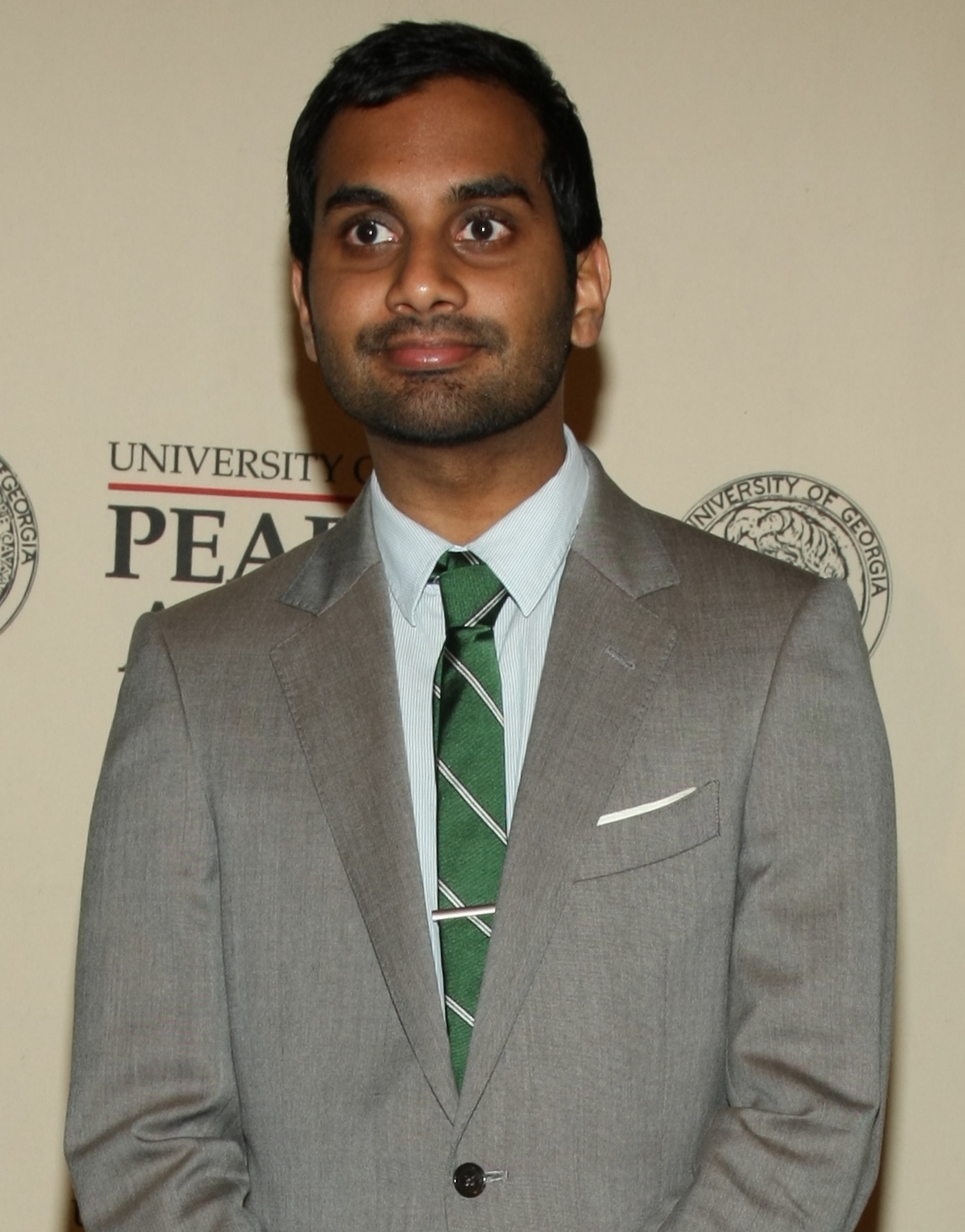
Aziz Ansari at the 71st Annual Peabody Awards Luncheon 2012

In addition to his work on Parks and Recreation, Ansari appeared on the HBO series Flight of the Conchords as an eccentric and prejudiced fruit vendor. He had a recurring role in season eight of the ABC sitcom Scrubs as Ed, a new intern at the hospital. Ansari's character was written off the show so he could work on Parks and Recreation. Ansari also has a recurring role on the animated comedy Bob's Burgers as Darryl.

In August 2011, Ansari made a cameo appearance in the music video for "Otis" by Jay-Z and Kanye West from their collaborative album Watch the Throne.

Ansari hosted the January 21, 2017, episode of Saturday Night Live, becoming the first person of Indian origin to do so. He later returned in 2025 to portray FBI Director Kash Patel.

=== Film career ===
Ansari has made appearances in several films, including Get Him to the Greek, I Love You, Man, 30 Minutes or Less, This Is the End, and Observe and Report. In 2009, Ansari appeared in the Judd Apatow film Funny People. Apatow liked Ansari's character, "Randy", and commissioned him and Human Giant collaborator Jason Woliner to create online shorts centered around his character, to promote the film. These shorts proved successful and the character became the subject of one of the film ideas Ansari and Woliner are developing for Apatow Productions. Two other ideas in development are Let's Do This, a road movie about two motivational speakers, and an untitled film about two disgraced astronauts who must return to space to clear their names. Ansari is attached to star in another film with Danny McBride based on an idea from Ansari and 30 Rock writer Matt Hubbard. In April 2010, it was announced that Ansari would star in the film 30 Minutes or Less. The film was directed by Ruben Fleischer and co-starred Jesse Eisenberg and McBride. The film was released on August 12, 2011.

=== Stand-up comedy ===
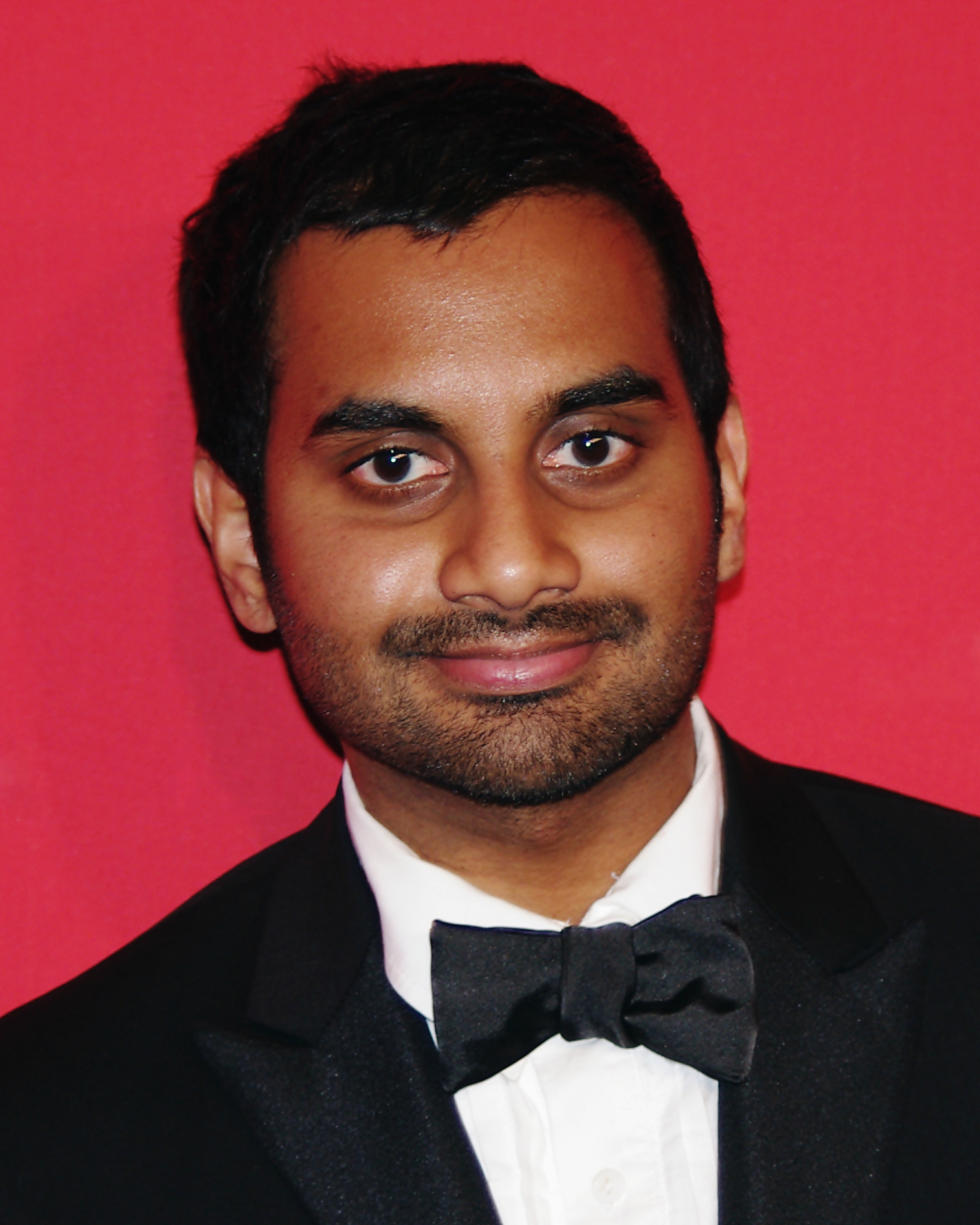
Aziz Ansari at the 2012 Time 100 gala.

Ansari tours as a stand-up comedian. In 2006 and 2007, he toured with the Comedians of Comedy and Flight of the Conchords. In late 2008 and early 2009, his own comedy tour, the Glow in the Dark Tour, became the basis for a DVD/CD special for Comedy Central. The set, titled Intimate Moments for a Sensual Evening, aired January 17, 2010.

Ansari's comedy style tends to focus on aspects of his personal life. "I like talking about things that are going on in my life, because that's always going to be different and original", he says. "No one else is gonna be talking about my personal experiences".

In July 2010, Ansari began a new tour, Dangerously Delicious, which was in theaters across the United States; stops included the Bonnaroo Music Festival and Carnegie Hall in New York City. The tour wrapped with a filming for a special, Dangerously Delicious at the Warner Theatre in Washington, D.C., in June 2011. This special was released on his website in March 2012 for download or stream.

In March 2012, Ansari announced a new tour entitled "Buried Alive", with dates scheduled for Q2/Q3 2012. A third stand-up special, Aziz Ansari: Buried Alive, was filmed during the tour at the Merriam Theater in Philadelphia, Pennsylvania, and premiered on Netflix on November 1, 2013. His 2015 special, Aziz Ansari: Live at Madison Square Garden, also premiered on Netflix.

In February 2019, Ansari began a new stand-up tour entitled The Road to Nowhere, which was his official public return after the sexual-misconduct allegations and media backlash that put his career on a year-long hiatus in 2018. The performance was a response to the events of that past year, and touched on topics ranging from cultural appropriation, racism to sexual misconduct. His next comedy special Aziz Ansari: Right Now was released on July 9, 2019, followed by Aziz Ansari: Nightclub Comedian, released on January 25, 2022.

In May 2019, Ansari teamed up with Dave Chappelle for three shows in Austin, Texas at the Paramount Theatre. In 2025, Ansari joined a line-up of comedians, including Dave Chappelle, slated to participate in the Riyadh Comedy Festival, an event hosted in Riyadh, the capital city of Saudi Arabia. The festival was criticized by Human Rights Watch, which characterized the event as an attempt by the Saudi government to whitewash its human rights abuses.

=== Writing ===
Ansari's book, Modern Romance: An Investigation, was released on June 16, 2015. The book is about the comedic pitfalls of dating in the modern world and was written with sociologist Eric Klinenberg.

=== Directing ===
In February 2022, Ansari was set to make his feature directorial debut with a dramedy film titled Being Mortal starring Bill Murray, Keke Palmer and Seth Rogen. It is an adaptation of the non-fiction book Being Mortal: Medicine and What Matters in the End by surgeon Atul Gawande, published in 2014. In April 2022, production of the film was halted due to a complaint of inappropriate behavior by Murray on set. According to The Hollywood Reporter, Ansari's second project Good Fortune was scheduled to begin filming in May 2023, but was delayed indefinitely due to the 2023 Writers Guild of America strike. The film was written and is being directed by and stars Ansari alongside Keanu Reeves, Seth Rogen, and Keke Palmer. In January 2024, the project was revealed to have begun filming with Ansari, Rogen, Reeves, and Palmer. It was released on October 17, 2025.

== Personal life ==
Ansari was raised as a Muslim, but has described himself as "not religious" on Twitter.

In 2014, he identified as a feminist, saying his girlfriend has helped influence him. Ansari also incorporated an episode about feminism titled "Ladies and Gentlemen" in Master of None. In 2015, he spoke about the episode's meaningfulness to him saying "I thought it was interesting that this is happening, yet so many people are unaware of it. And the problem is people aren't talking about it. What I've learned, as a guy, is to just ask women questions and listen to what they have to say. Go to your group of female friends and ask them about times they've experienced sexism at their job, and you'll get blown away by the things they tell you."

Ansari, Eric Wareheim, and Jason Woliner had formed what they called "The Food Club", which involves them dressing up in suits and captain hats and rewarding restaurants with "Food Club" plaques. The plaques have their faces engraved along with the words: "The Food Club has dined here and deemed it plaque-worthy". He explained to Vanity Fair, "It's a really serious-looking plaque and all of the restaurants we've given it to have put it front and center. It's funny because people will walk into a restaurant and be like, 'What the fuck is the Food Club? Who are these guys etched in gold?'" They also produced a tongue-in-cheek video about the club for Jash, filming them debating whether or not restaurants were plaque-worthy.

Ansari was a close friend of the comedian Harris Wittels; they frequently worked together and were working on a new script together at the time of Wittels's death. Wittels had also been set to star in Master of None before his death; his role was ultimately taken by Wareheim.

Ansari purchased an apartment in Tribeca, Downtown Manhattan in 2018 that had been owned by New York Rangers captain Ryan McDonagh for US$5.7 million.

In 2021, Ansari became engaged to Danish forensic data scientist Serena Skov Campbell. In June 2022, Ansari and Campbell got married in Tuscany, Italy. They currently live in London.

=== Sexual misconduct accusation ===
In January 2018, a woman using the pseudonym "Grace" accused Ansari of sexual misconduct in an article on Babe.net, a website aimed at Millennial and Gen-Z readers. According to the article, the woman later texted Ansari expressing her discomfort, and he replied to her with an apology.

Media critic Allison Davis, who later interviewed the article's author, Katie Way, said that the article became a "flashpoint of discussion about #MeToo". There was disagreement in media commentary as to whether the incident described in the Babe article constituted sexual misconduct. Ansari stated that the encounter "by all indications was completely consensual", but some commentators alleged that his actions were misogynistic, lacked affirmative consent, and spoke to a larger culture of harmful male expectations. Others said that Ansari's actions did not constitute sexual misconduct and that his accuser's narrative trivializes the #MeToo movement against forms of sexual abuse. Way was criticized for her handling of the story and for not following accepted journalistic standards. For The Atlantic, James Hamblin wrote that these "stories of gray areas are exactly what [...] need to be told and discussed." "Even Ansari, the semi-ironic expert who authored a book on interpersonal communication [...] was seeing something totally different from his date, Grace", who felt coerced.

Ansari briefly receded from the public eye following the incident and resumed performing stand-up comedy in May 2018.

== Filmography ==
=== Film ===
Year	Title	Role	Notes
2006	School for Scoundrels	Classmate	
2008	The Rocker	Aziz	
2009	Funny People	Randy Springs	
2009	Observe and Report	Saddamn	
2009	I Love You, Man	Eugene	
2010	Get Him to the Greek	Matty Briggs	
2011	30 Minutes or Less	Chet	
2011	What's Your Number?	Jay	Voice
2012	Ice Age: Continental Drift	Squint	Voice
2012	Cruel Summer	Prisoner	
2013	Epic	Mub	Voice
2013	This Is the End	Himself	
2014	Date and Switch	Marcus	
2014	Food Club	Captain Ansari	Short
2017	The Problem with Apu	Himself	Documentary
2022	The Bob's Burgers Movie	Darryl	Voice
2025	Good Fortune	Arj	Also director, writer, and producer

=== Television ===
Year	Title	Role	Notes
2004	Uncle Morty's Dub Shack	MC Bricklayer	Episode: "Didja Listen to My Demo?"
2007	Flight of the Conchords	Sinjay	Episode "Drive By"
2007–2008	Human Giant	Various roles	16 episodes, also co-creator, writer, executive producer
2008	Worst Week	Morgue employee	Episode: "Pilot"
2009	Reno 911!	Insurance representative	3 episodes
2009	Scrubs	Ed Dhandapani	4 episodes
2009–2015, 2020	Parks and Recreation	Tom Haverford	Main cast (all 7 seasons)
2010	Aziz Ansari: Intimate Moments for a Sensual Evening	Himself	Stand-up special
2010	The Life & Times of Tim	Gabe	Episode: "Nagging Blonde/Tim & the Elephant"
2010	2010 MTV Movie Awards	Himself (host)	TV special
2012	Aziz Ansari: Dangerously Delicious	Himself	Stand-up special
2012	NTSF:SD:SUV::	The Toucher	Episode: "Prairie Dog Companion"
2012–2022	Bob's Burgers	Darryl	Voice, 14 episodes
2013	The Venture Bros.	Martin	Voice, episode: "What Color Is Your Cleansuit?"
2013	Comedy Bang! Bang!	Himself	Episode: "Aziz Ansari Wears A Charcoal Blazer"
2013	The Comedy Central Roast of James Franco	Himself (roaster)	TV special
2013	The Getaway	Host	Episode: "Aziz Ansari in Hong Kong"
2013	Aziz Ansari: Buried Alive	Himself	Stand-up special
2013	Wander Over Yonder	Westley	Voice, episode: "The Little Guy"
2013	Arcade Fire in Here Comes The Night Time	Li'l Bud	TV special
2013–2014	Ben 10: Omniverse	Billy Billions	Voice, 2 episodes
2013–2015	The League	Dr. Hector Rocha	2 episodes
2013–2015	Adventure Time	DMO	Voice, 3 episodes
2014	Comedians in Cars Getting Coffee	Himself (guest)	Episode: "It's Like Pushing a Building Off a Cliff"
2015	Kroll Show	Sly Dufrense	Episode: "Body Bouncers"
2015	Major Lazer	Goosh	Voice, episode: "I'm Gonna Git You Suckoid"
2015	Aziz Ansari: Live at Madison Square Garden	Himself	Stand-up special
2015–2021	Master of None	Dev Shah	Main cast (season 1–2), Recurring (season 3) also Co-creator, Executive Producer, Writer, and Director
2016	Animals.	Charles	Voice, episode: "Dogs."
2017	Saturday Night Live	Himself (host)	Episode: "Aziz Ansari/Big Sean"
2018	Ugly Delicious	Himself	Episode: "Pizza."
2019	Aziz Ansari: Right Now	Himself	Stand-up special
2022	Aziz Ansari: Nightclub Comedian	Himself	Stand-up special
2026	Saturday Night Live	Kash Patel	3 episodes

=== Music videos ===
Year	Artist	Song	Role
2011	Jay-Z and Kanye West	"Otis"	Himself

=== Discography ===
- Intimate Moments for a Sensual Evening (Comedy Central Records, 2010)
- Dangerously Delicious (Comedy Central Records, 2012)
- Buried Alive (Comedy Central Records, 2015)

=== Stand-up specials ===
- Intimate Moments for a Sensual Evening (released on Comedy Central and DVD, 2010)
- Aziz Ansari: Dangerously Delicious (released on Aziz's Website, 2012)
- Aziz Ansari: Buried Alive (released on Netflix, 2013)
- Aziz Ansari: Live at Madison Square Garden (released on Netflix, 2015)
- Aziz Ansari: Right Now (released on Netflix, 2019)
- Aziz Ansari: Nightclub Comedian (released on Netflix, 2022)

== Recognition and awards ==
Ansari was included in the Time 100 list of most influential people in 2016.

For Master of None, in 2018 Ansari won several acting and writing awards, including two Emmys and a Golden Globe, the latter being the first award received by an Asian American actor for acting on television.

In 2019 Aziz Ansari: Right Now was nominated for a Grammy Award for Best Comedy Album.

== Bibliography ==
- Ansari, Aziz; Klinenberg, Eric (2015). Modern Romance: An Investigation. Penguin Press. ISBN 9781594206276.
