= Jo Koy: Live from Seattle =

- Directed by: Shannon Hartman
- Starring: Jo Koy
- Country of origin: United States
- Original language: English

Production
- Running time: 62 minutes

Original release
- Network: Netflix
- Release: March 28, 2017

Jo Koy: Live from Seattle is a 2017 Netflix stand-up comedy special by American comic Jo Koy, his first Netflix stand-up special for Netflix. In Live from Seattle, directed by Shannon Hartman, Jo Koy talks about Filipina stereotypes, raising a teenage boy and more.

== Cast ==
- Jo Koy

== Release ==
It was released on March 28, 2017, on Netflix streaming.
