= Aziz Ansari: Live at Madison Square Garden =

2015 stand-up comedy special by Aziz Ansari

- Directed by: Aziz Ansari
- Written by: Aziz Ansari
- Produced by: Aziz Ansari; Jonathan Lia
- Starring: Aziz Ansari
- Cinematography: Todd Somodevilla
- Edited by: Jeff Buchanan
- Music by: Ennio Morricone
- Production companies: 3 Arts Entertainment; Good Company; Oh Brudder Productions
- Distributed by: Netflix
- Release date: March 6, 2015 (Netflix)
- Running time: 58 minutes
- Country: United States
- Language: English

Aziz Ansari: Live at Madison Square Garden is a 2015 American stand-up comedy concert film starring, written, directed and produced by Aziz Ansari. It was shot at Madison Square Garden in New York City in October 2014.

== Synopsis ==
Topics up for discussion include misogyny, Internet cruelty, factory farming and how modern technology has destroyed our ability to truly connect with one another

== Production ==
The performance was recorded in October 2014. Ansari used the theme from For a Few Dollars More by Ennio Morricone as his entrance music. He chose this, and a series of images on a digital screen, to demonstrate his ambition and imagination. Before he performed at Madison Square Garden, a large venue at which few standup comedians had performed, he sought advice from Chris Rock, a mentor who had performed there previously. Rock advised him to concentrate more on his jokes than the spectacle. Ansari attributed the change in the topics he addressed to maturing and growing older.

In order to make the stadium show interesting for the audience, he was inspired by music tours, such as the Watch the Throne tour, and he recruited people who had worked on that production. Ansari was originally going to shoot the special in Toronto, but Rock convinced him to do so at Madison Square Garden, which Rock felt was more appropriate.

== Release ==
The film was released March 6, 2015, exclusively on Netflix. It was dedicated to the memory of Harris Wittels, Ansari's close friend and a writer on Parks and Recreation, who died February 19.

== Reception ==
Reviewing the original performance, Jason Zinoman of The New York Times called it Ansari's most ambitious but least funny work. Zinoman wrote, "And while he's a thoughtful observer, Mr. Ansari's ideas can too often seem derivative."

Robert Lloyd of the Los Angeles Times called it "worlds more thoughtful, enlightened, inward-looking and outward-aware" than his television performances. David Sims of The Atlantic wrote, "[T]he quality of his comedy is actually starting to catch up with the level of his fame." Kayla Kumari Upadhyaya of The A.V. Club rated it "A" and wrote, "[Ansari] doesn't need to reach far for his observations; instead, he focuses on very ordinary, everyday behaviors, picks them apart, and brings them to life with his reenactments and imagined conversations." Garrett Martin of Paste wrote, "[Ansari] can comfortably broach serious, depressing issues and cut right to the heart of society's ills without ever growing strident." Audra Schroeder of The Daily Dot wrote, "His elastic personality and trademark vocal stretches sustain the energy needed for a comic to command MSG."
