= Intimate Moments for a Sensual Evening =

Live album by Aziz Ansari
- Released: January 19, 2010
- Recorded: July 1, 2009, Brentwood Theatre, Los Angeles
- Genre: Comedy
- Length: 54:37
- Label: Comedy Central Records
- Producer: Jack Vaughn Jr.

Intimate Moments for a Sensual Evening is the debut album by comedian Aziz Ansari, released by Comedy Central Records on January 19, 2010.

The album is the audio of Ansari's first one-hour special, recorded on July 1, 2009 at The Brentwood Theatre in Los Angeles, near the end of his Glow In the Dark tour. The special was first broadcast on Comedy Central on January 17, 2010, and the DVD was released by Comedy Central Home Entertainment on January 19, 2010. The filmed version of the special was directed by Jason Woliner.

== CD ==
No.	Title	Length
1.	"Gay Rights"	2:58
2.	"Sheets"	2:34
3.	"CVS"	1:06
4.	"Getting the Sniffles on a Flight"	0:34
5.	"Craigslist"	2:12
6.	"My Random Roommate"	2:56
7.	"Getting Recognized in New York"	0:40
8.	"Walking with Dinosaurs"	1:22
9.	"Simple Man Cruise"	1:48
10.	"My Cousin Harris"	1:36
11.	"Harassing Harris on Facebook"	3:59
12.	"Are White People Psyched All the Time?"	0:57
13.	"MTV's Next"	3:35
14.	"The J-1 Waiver"	0:45
15.	"Using My BlackBerry While Driving"	2:02
16.	"Bonnaroo"	1:29
17.	"Cold Stone Creamery"	2:06
18.	"Something Cool to Say to M.I.A."	0:41
19.	"A Night Out with Kanye West"	4:01
20.	"Kanye West vs. Darwish"	2:11
21.	"R. Kelly: The Pied Piper of R&B"	5:40
22.	"RAAAAAAAANDY"	9:33

== DVD ==
1. "Gay Rights"
2. "Sheets"
3. "CVS / Getting the Sniffles on a Flight"
4. "Craigslist AD"
5. "My Random Roommate / Getting Recognized in New York"
6. "Walking with Dinosaurs"
7. "Simple Man Cruise"
8. "My Cousin Harris"
9. "Harassing Harris on Facebook"
10. "Are White People Psyched All the Time?"
11. "MTV's Next"
12. "The J-1 Waiver / Using My BlackBerry While Driving"
13. "Bonnaroo"
14. "Cold Stone Creamery / Something Cool to Say to M.I.A."
15. "A Night Out with Kanye West"
16. "Kanye West vs. Darwish"
17. "R. Kelly: The Pied Piper of R&B"
18. "RAAAAAAAANDY"
