= Avalon Entertainment =

British production company

Avalon Entertainment Limited
- Formerly: Avalon Television (1989-2009)
- Type: Private limited company
- Industry: Television
- Genre: Independent media
- Founded: January 18, 1989; 37 years ago
- Founders: Richard Allen-Turner; Jon Thoday
- Headquarters: London, England, United Kingdom
- Area served: Europe
- Divisions: Avalon Distribution
- Subsidiaries: Calamity Films
- Website: avalonuk.com

Avalon Entertainment Limited is a British entertainment production and talent management group that consists of the companies: Avalon Television, Avalon Management, Avalon Distribution, Avalon Promotions, Flame Television, Liberty Bell Productions, Tinderbox Television, Topical Television, Calamity Films, ARG Talent, and The Agency. Headquartered in London they also have offices based in New York and Beverly Hills.

Avalon Television is an independent television production company. Avalon Management is a talent agency in the entertainment industry. Avalon Distribution is responsible for international sales of programmes and formats. Avalon Promotions manages artists bookings, live tours, theatre productions and other promotions.

== History ==
Avalon was founded in 1989 by Richard Allen-Turner and Jon Thoday.

In August 2005, Avalon acquired the factual production outfit behind the conversational series Grumpy Old Men Liberty Bell Productions, marking Avalon's entry into the factual entertainment genre.

On 27 August 2009, Avalon acquired factual entertainment and daytime programming specialist production company Flame Television alongside its management and international sales divisions, further expanding Avalon's factual entertainment activities.

On 7 December 2012, Avalon Management acquired London celebrity talent agency Artists Rights Group from All3Media, effectively ARG became a subsidiary of Avalon Management whilst the talent agency continued to act independently within Avalon Management.

In October 2020, Avalon bought a majority stake in British agency specialist The Agency after collaborating with them for 25 years as Avalon created a global representation business with The Agency continuing under the leadership of its partners.

In December 2025, Avalon acquired a stake in London-based independent film and television production studio Calamity Films with its founder David Livingstone continuing to control the acquired studio.

== Filmography ==
=== Television series ===
| Title | Years | Network | Notes |
|---|---|---|---|
| Fantasy Football League | 1994–1996; 2022–2024 | BBC2; ITV (specials); Sky Max | |
| Jenny Eclair Squats | 1997 | Channel 5 | |
| Harry Hill | 1997–2003 | Channel 4/ITV | |
| Baddiel and Skinner Unplanned | 2000–2005 | ITV | |
| The Sketch Show | 2001–2004 | ITV | co-production with Baby Cow Productions |
| Harry Hill's TV Burp | 2001–2012 | ITV | |
| Garth Marenghi's Darkplace | 2004 | Channel 4 | |
| Kelsey Grammer Presents: The Sketch Show | 2005 | Fox | co-production with Grammnet Productions, Baby Cow Productions, Angst Productions and Fox 21 |
| Harry Hill's Shark Infested Custard | 2005–2006 | ITV (CITV) | |
| Touch Me, I'm Karen Taylor | 2006–2008 | BBC Three | |
| The Greg Behrendt Show | 2006–2007 | Syndication | co-production with Sony Pictures Television |
| Not Going Out | 2006–present | BBC One | |
| Russell Howard's Good News | 2009–2015 | BBC Three/BBC Two | |
| John Oliver's New York Stand-Up Show | 2010–2013 | Comedy Central | co-production with Comedy Partners, Art & Industry and Sixteen String Jack Productions |
| Frank Skinner's Opinionated | 2010–2011 | BBC Two | |
| Lee Nelson's Well Good Show | 2010–2011 | BBC Three | |
| Workaholics | 2011–2017 | Comedy Central | co-production with Comedy Partners, Mail Order Comedy, Gigapix Studios (season 1–3) and 5th Year Productions (seasons 1–4) |
| Al Murray's Compete for the Meat | 2011 | Dave | |
| You Cannot Be Serious! | 2012 | ITV | |
| Bunk | 2012 | IFC | co-production with G-BEHH Industries and IFC Original Productions |
| Lee Nelson's Well Funny People | 2013 | BBC Three | |
| I Love My Country | 2013 | BBC One | co-production with Talpa and BBC Scotland |
| Man Down | 2013–2017 | Channel 4 | |
| Adam Devine's House Party | 2013–2016 | Comedy Central | co-production with Comedy Partners, Dennis and Penny's Son, Inc. and Wonk Inc. |
| Last Week Tonight with John Oliver | 2014–present | HBO | co-production with HBO Entertainment, Partially Important Productions, Sixteen String Jack Productions and Bochard Entertainment |
| Catastrophe | 2015–2019 | Channel 4 | co-production with Merman and Birdbath Productions |
| Taskmaster | 2015-present | Dave/Channel 4 | |
| Russell Howard & Mum | 2016–2019 | Comedy Central UK | |
| Dogs Behaving (Very) Badly | 2017–present | Channel 4/Channel 5 | |
| Truth & Iliza | 2017 | Freeform | co-production with HaunchmeatGlobal Inc. |
| The Russell Howard Hour | 2017–2022 | Sky One/Sky Max | |
| The Button | 2018 | BBC One | |
| Taskmaster America | 2018 | Comedy Central | |
| Alternatino with Arturo Castro | 2019 | Comedy Central | co-production with Comedy Partners, Arturo Pictures and JS Martel Productions |
| Everything's Gonna Be Okay | 2020–2021 | Freeform | co-production with John & Josh International |
| Breeders | 2020–2023 | Sky One/Sky Comedy; FX (United States) | co-production with FX Productions |
| Spitting Image | 2020–present | BritBox/YouTube | |
| Taskmaster New Zealand | 2020–present | TVNZ 2 | co-production with Kevin & Co |
| Starstruck | 2021–2023 | BBC Three | |
| Flatbush Misdemeanors | 2021–2022 | Showtime | co-production with Showtime Networks, Born Tired, and Pebo's Perkin |
| Extraordinary Extensions | 2021–present | Channel 4 | |
| The Chris & Rosie Ramsey Show | 2022–2024 | BBC Two/BBC One | |
| The Horne Section TV Show | 2022–2025 | Channel 4 | |
| Taskmaster Australia | 2023–present | Network 10 | co-production with Kevin & Co |
| Trippin' With Anthony Anderson and Mama Doris | 2023 | E! | |
| Junior Taskmaster | 2024–present | Channel 4 | |
| Leonard and Hungry Paul | 2025–present | RTÉ/BBC Northern Ireland | co-production with Subotica |
| The Terrors of Jordan Mendoza | 2026–present | Adult Swim | co-production with Abominable Pictures, Sasa Pictures and Williams Street |

=== Films/specials ===
| Title | Year(s) | Notes | Distributor |
|---|---|---|---|
| Marc Maron: Thinky Pain | 2013 | co-production with Boomer Lives! Productions and New Wave Entertainment | Netflix |
| Jen Kirkman: I'm Gonna Die Alone (And I Feel Fine) | 2015 | co-production with New Wave Entertainment | Netflix |
| Russell Howard: Recalibrate | 2017 | | Netflix |
| Greg Davies: You Magnificent Beast | 2018 | | Netflix |
| The Horne Section Television Programme | 2018 | | Dave |
| Adam DeVine: Best Time of Our Lives | 2019 | co-production with Dennis and Penny's Son, Inc. | Netflix |
| Flo and Joan: Alive on Stage | 2019 | | Amazon Prime Video |
| Chris Ramsey Approval Needed | 2019 | | Amazon Prime Video |
| Ed Gamble: Blood Sugar | 2019 | | Amazon Prime Video |
| Paul Chowdhry: Live Innit | 2019 | | Amazon Prime Video |
| Iliza Shlesinger: Unveiled | 2019 | | Netflix |
| Jayde Adams: Serious Black Jumper | 2020 | | Amazon Prime Video |
| Rob Delaney: Jackie | 2020 | | Amazon Prime Video |
| Marc Maron: End Times Fun | 2020 | | Netflix |
| Marc Maron: From Bleak to Dark | 2023 | | HBO Max |
| Ahir Shah: Ends | 2024 | | Netflix |
| Chris Ramsey: Live From London | 2024 | | Apple TV; Sky Comedy |

=== Podcasts ===
| Title | Years | Notes |
|---|---|---|
| Matt Forde's Political Party | 2013-present | |
| Shagged Married Annoyed | 2019–2025 | |
