= Lee Nelson =

Lee Nelson may refer to:

- Lee Nelson (American football) (b. 1954), retired American football player
- Lee Nelson (cricketer) (born 1990), Irish cricketer
- Lee Nelson, a comedy character created by Simon Brodkin
  - Lee Nelson's Well Good Show, a 2010 British television comedy show
  - Lee Nelson's Well Funny People, a 2013 British television comedy show
- Lee Nelson (poker player) (b. 1943), New Zealand doctor and professional poker player
