= Iliza Shlesinger: Unveiled =

- Poster
- Directed by: Steve Paley
- Written by: Iliza Shlesinger
- Starring: Darren Capozzi; Mona Parks; Iliza Shlesinger
- Distributed by: Netflix
- Release date: November 19, 2019 (Netflix)
- Running time: 78 minutes
- Country: United States
- Language: English

Iliza Shlesinger: Unveiled is a 2019 American stand-up comedy film directed by Steve Paley and written by and starring Iliza Shlesinger. It serves as Shlesinger's fifth Netflix stand-up special, following War Paint from 2013, Freezing Hot from 2015, Confirmed Kills from 2016 and Elder Millennial from 2018. In Unveiled, newlywed Iliza Shlesinger discusses the topic of marriage and its traditions from a modern, feminist perspective. Shlesinger uses relatable anecdotes to address the societal pressures placed on women during the wedding planning process, as well as the absurdity of some of the longstanding traditions associated with marriage. It was released on November 19, 2019, on Netflix.
