= Iliza Shlesinger: Elder Millennial =

- Poster
- Directed by: Steve Paley
- Written by: Iliza Shlesinger
- Starring: Iliza Shlesinger
- Distributed by: Netflix
- Release date: July 24, 2018 (Netflix)
- Running time: 72 minutes
- Country: United States
- Language: English

Iliza Shlesinger: Elder Millennial is a 2018 American stand-up comedy film directed by Steve Paley and written by and starring Iliza Shlesinger. It serves as Shlesinger's fourth stand-up comedy special for Netflix, following War Paint from 2013, Freezing Hot from 2015 and Confirmed Kills from 2016. In Elder Millennial, Iliza talks about life at age 35 and more. It was released on July 24, 2018, on Netflix.
