= Souad Faress =

UK-based media personality and actress

- Born: Souad Adel Faress; 25 March 1948 (age 78); Accra, Ghana
- Education: Guildhall School of Music and Drama
- Occupations: Stage, radio, film, television actress
- Years active: 1960–present

Souad Adel Faress (born 25 March 1948) is a stage, radio, television and film actress based in United Kingdom. She is best known for her portrayal of the solicitor Usha Gupta, in the long-running BBC Radio 4 serial The Archers. She has also played the High Priestess of the Dosh Khaleen in the sixth season of the HBO series Game of Thrones, the Bene Gesserit sister accompanying the Herald of the Change in Dune: Part One, and the Fate Crone in The Sandman. Born in Ghana, she also holds Syrian and Irish citizenships.

== Early life and education ==
Faress was born in 1948 in Accra, Ghana, to Irish and Syrian parents. She grew up in Southport, Lancashire, studied drama at the Guildhall School of Music and Drama.

== Career ==
Faress appeared in two episodes of the BBC serial I, Claudius (1976) as a slave girl (shouting fire) and as a dancer who at Messalina's (second and bigamous) marriage party realises troops are coming to arrest them. In another early BBC appearance, she played the character Selma in the Blake's 7 episode 'Horizon'. Since then, Faress has had substantial roles in films such as My Beautiful Laundrette (1985) and Sixth Happiness (1997), as well as much stage work around the UK.

In October 2001 she appeared briefly in Coronation Street as Dev Alahan's mother Umila.

Souad Faress also appeared as the Old Rani in The Sarah Jane Adventures serial The Mad Woman in the Attic in October 2009.

In October 2014, it was announced that Faress would perform in Hurried Steps, Sharon Wood's translation of "Passi Affrettati by Dacia Maraini. The play's narratives were mainly sourced from Amnesty International, the subject matter including rape, honour killings, sex trafficking and other issues of violence against women.

Between 2010 and 2011 she played Jay Faldren's grandmother, Maryam Shakiba, in Casualty.

Faress appeared in an episode of popular nursing drama No Angels as lead character, Anji Mittel's aunt Di. Faress appeared briefly as a hospital doctor in "The Dead of Jericho", the first episode of Inspector Morse.

In 2016 she joined the HBO series Game of Thrones in Season 6 as the High Priestess of the Dosh Khaleen. Faress also appeared in ITV drama Brief Encounters, "a loose adaptation of Ann Summers CEO Jacqueline Gold's memoirs, Good Vibrations".

In 2018, Faress appeared in Clare Holman's short film Only the Lonely.

In 2019, Faress appeared as a recurring character in Daisy Haggard and Laura Solon's sitcom Back to Life and as the mother of Eli Cohen in the OCS/Netflix miniseries The Spy.

== Personal life ==
Faress lives in London. She has been exploring playwriting as a medium since before 2004. Faress completed a writing course at City Literary Institute adult education college. Her other skills include dancing, horse riding, cricket and yoga.

== See also ==
- List of Ghanaian actors and actresses
