= Dan Perlman =

American writer, director, comedian and actor

- Perlman in 2022
- Education: Northwestern University
- Occupations: Comedian; writer; director
- Years active: 2013–present

Comedy career
- Medium: Stand-up; television; film
- Website: www.danperlmancomedy.com

Dan Perlman is an American writer, director, comedian, and actor. He is best known as the co-creator, writer, and star of the Showtime comedy series Flatbush Misdemeanors (2021–2022).

== Early life and education ==
Perlman was born and raised in New York City. He attended Northwestern University, where he graduated from their School of Education & Social Policy in 2012. In college, Perlman worked as a tutor and wrote and produced short comedy sketches. He also completed independent studies with SESP professor Dan Lewis, researching and writing about suburban homelessness.

== Career ==
=== Stand-up & early work ===
During this time, he started stand-up comedy in Chicago, where he "felt more comfortable failing when nobody I knew was within a thousand miles... That was very freeing. And I could sort of get better and get comfortable that way."

After graduation, Perlman moved back to New York, where he started doing open mics in 2013. He began as an intern on SiriusXM's Ron & Fez, while starting out in stand-up. He continued to work for Ron Bennington as a writer-producer for SiriusXM's Bennington.

In 2016, Perlman co-created and wrote the animated pilot, That's My Bus!, which was ordered by Fox. The project was not ordered to series, but Perlman remarked the process "gave me more motivation and direction... If/when I'm fortunate to be in a spot like that again, I'll have gone through all of the steps before, so I'll keep getting better at that side of it."

Perlman was chosen as one of the New Faces of Comedy for the 2018 Just For Laughs Festival in Montreal. He released his debut stand-up album Emergency Contact, for free on his YouTube channel. Perlman was featured on Comedy Central's Stand-Up Featuring series. Bret Raybould from Pipeline Artists wrote that Perlman developed a reputation as "one of the most respected comics within the city."

In 2020, Perlman made regular guest appearances on SiriusXM's You Up? With Nikki Glaser. He acted in multiple episodes of The Iliza Shlesinger Sketch Show on Netflix. During this time, he co-wrote multiple pieces for The New Yorker's Shouts & Murmurs humor section.

=== Flatbush Misdemeanors ===
Flatbush Misdemeanors started as an independent low-budget web series, with three fifteen-minute episodes. Perlman said, "We cut anything that would be budget, because we had none." He noted their biggest expense was "a couple hundred to bribe a janitor" to allow them to film in a school in Queens on a Saturday.

Perlman said the lack of budget forced them to "find other ways to make it feel creative within our limitations," including interstitials and audio intros that became part of the Showtime series.

The first short won the Grand Jury Award at the 2018 Florida Film Festival. Flatbush screened at prominent film festivals like Slamdance, LA Film Festival, and Rooftop Films.

In October 2020, Showtime gave a ten-episode, straight-to-series order for Flatbush Misdemeanors. Perlman used his experiences studying education in the series, where he played a public school teacher, Dan Joseph, who's "not saving anyone." Perlman said it was intentional to subvert white savior tropes in the series. He has also cited Hey Arnold! as a major influence on Flatbush.

The series was widely praised from critics. Showtime renewed Flatbush for a second season, which premiered in 2022. Perlman directed the well-received episode, 'boomerang', which Vulture praised for "masterful direction at play." The series was canceled after two seasons.

In 2023, Perlman headlined The Kennedy Center in DC, alongside Flatbush castmates Yamaneika Saunders and Kerry Coddett.

In 2024, Perlman graduated from the WGA East Showrunner Academy, designed for the next class of "successful showrunners and leaders in today's television industry.”

=== Filmmaking ===
Perlman wrote and directed the coming-of-age short film Cramming, which earned honors at prestigious film festivals including Brooklyn, Rhode Island, and Nashville.

He wrote and directed the short film Practice Space, which won the Neighborhood Award at the Lower East Side Film Festival. The film reunited the two young actors from his earlier short Cramming. Brian Braiker of Brooklyn Magazine compared the pair of films to Richard Linklater’s Boyhood and the Before Trilogy.

In 2025, Perlman directed and starred in a documentary short film Being Bublé, which premiered at the Santa Fe International Film Festival. The doc short screened at notable fests including Florida, Manchester, and Montclair. The film was the subject of a feature profile in The New York Times and an episode of the podcast This is Love.

He directed the short film No Sex, a queer romance drama which accumulated more than 7 million views on YouTube.

Perlman received a Rooftop Films Filmmakers Fund Grant to develop a feature film version of Cramming. In 2026, he wrapped production on the feature, with a new plot, starring Maria Bamford, Gary Gulman, Laura Benanti, among others.
