= Laura Solon: Talking and Not Talking =

UK radio program

- Genre: Sketch comedy
- Running time: 30 minutes
- Country of origin: United Kingdom
- Language: English
- Home station: BBC Radio 4
- Starring: Laura Solon; Rosie Cavaliero; Ben Moor; Katherine Parkinson; Ben Willbond
- Created by: Laura Solon
- Written by: Laura Solon; Ben Moor; Charlie Miller; Andy Marlatt (s1-2); Stephen Carlin; Jon Hunter; Holly Walsh; James Sherwood (s1-2); Gareth Glynn (s3); John Luke Roberts (s3)
- Produced by: Colin Anderson
- Original release: 10 January 2007 – 23 December 2009
- No. of series: 3
- No. of episodes: 18
- Website: BBC website page

Laura Solon: Talking and Not Talking is a comedy sketch show created by British Perrier Award-winning comedian Laura Solon. Produced in collaboration with the BBC after her success with Kopfraper's Syndrome: One Man and His Incredible Mind, it was first broadcast on BBC Radio 4. Similar to Solon's previous works, Talking and Not Talking is a compilation of a variety of short sketches featuring different recurring and one-off characters. The show earned the title of "Best British Radio Sketch Show of 2008" on the British Comedy Guide website.

== Recurring characters ==
- China Lion, a china ornament owned by a demented Teutonic lady. In each appearance, the woman gives a different account of the way in which she acquired China Lion, always involving peculiar circumstances. In later series, the woman interrupts various BBC events to recount tales of imaginary battles with her domestic staff, especially her nemesis, the cleaner.
- Gwynneth, an inept call centre operative with a Welsh accent who always gives completely useless advice.
- Divorcee Carole Price: Known for her unworkable business ideas, such as the cushion cover cover, which fail to distract from the fact that her life is falling apart. This character also makes an appearance in the TV series Al Murray's Multiple Personality Disorder.
- The Time Travelling Pride and Prejudice girls, who use a stargate in order to find husbands and often appear through fridges and other appliances.
- A Russian tyrant trying to settle into modern life in the UK.
- A French journalist who hates the English.
