= Brodkin =

Brodkin is a surname. Notable people with the surname include:

- Herbert Brodkin (1912–1990), American producer and director of film and television
- Simon Brodkin (born 1977), English comedian
