= Separation Anxiety (TV series) =

American television game show

- Genre: Game show
- Presented by: Iliza Shlesinger; Adam Ray
- Country of origin: United States
- Original language: English
- No. of seasons: 1
- No. of episodes: 14

Production
- Executive producers: Craig Armstrong; Rick Ringbakk; Charles Wachter; Chris Grants
- Running time: 42 minutes
- Production companies: 5×5 Media; Electus

Original release
- Network: TBS
- Release: March 8 – June 7, 2016

Separation Anxiety is an American television game show hosted by Iliza Shlesinger. The series premiered on TBS on March 8, 2016.

== Plot ==
It is staged as a game show within a game show. An unsuspecting couple (married, best friends, siblings, etc.) is brought to a studio in Atlanta, where they think they're playing together on an Internet game show for a top prize of $2,500. Just before taping, the couple is told that the rules have changed, and that one half of the couple will play first, and the other will play later.

== Game play ==
The player who is told they'll "play later" is taken to the real Separation Anxiety studio, where host Iliza Shlesinger explains the real game. The in-studio player will select the categories that their partner is playing in the fake Internet game. The real prizes are 100 times the dollar amounts shown in the fake game (so the first $10 question is really worth $1,000). The game uses an 8-question money tree, with a top real prize of $250,000.

During the game, the in-studio player gets several opportunities, called "Mind Melds", to earn bonus prizes for predicting what their partner did during hidden-camera segments shot after the players were separated but before the fake game taping began. Those prizes are kept, even if the team loses the main game. Additionally, the fake-game player has two helps that they can use: Smart Phone, which lets them call the in-studio player for help, and Crowd Source, which lets them poll the six-member audience of the fake game show. They can only use each help once, and cannot use them on the $250,000 question.

There are four ways the game can end:

- The fake-game player can answer 8 questions correctly, winning what they believe to be $2,500, after which the door between the fake and real studios opens and they are informed they've won $250,000.
- The fake-game player can stop the game after any correct answer. The reveal then happens, and they're informed they've won 100 times the prize they kept in the fake game.
- After correctly answering the $25,000 question, each time the fake player decides to proceed to the next question, the in-studio player can opt to end the game and keep half of the real prize. The reveal is immediately made to the fake player if the in-studio player accepts.
- The fake-game player answers one question incorrectly. They are told they've won nothing, but after the reveal of the real studio, the couple is given a $5,000 consolation prize.

Comedian Adam Ray hosts the fake game show, and usually does whatever comedic bits or unusual actions that Shlesinger directs him to do through his IFB earpiece.

== Episodes ==
No.	Title	Original release date	US viewers (millions)
1	"Troy & Erin"	March 8, 2013	0.947
2	"Clancy & Adam"	March 15, 2013	N/A
3	"Kelia & BJ"	March 22, 2013	N/A
4	"Gregory & Corey"	March 29, 2013	N/A
5	"Carolyn & Celina"	April 5, 2013	N/A
6	"Pablo & Eva"	April 12, 2013	N/A
7	"Britt & Jensen"	April 19, 2013	N/A
8	"Trai & Kristen"	April 26, 2013	N/A
9	"Derrick & Jhinezka"	May 3, 2013	N/A
10	"Ashley & Maggie"	May 10, 2013	N/A
11	"Jenna & Sebastian"	May 17, 2013	N/A
12	"Matt & Samantha"	May 24, 2013	N/A
13	"Jeff & Luke"	May 31, 2013	N/A
14	"Marty & Lindsey"	June 7, 2013	N/A
