= Honeymooner =

- Promotional poster
- Directed by: Col Spector
- Written by: Col Spector
- Produced by: Alicia Brown; Col Spector
- Starring: Gerard Kearns; Daisy Haggard; Chris Coghill; Al Weaver; Montserrat Roig de Puig; Wunmi Mosaku; Lisa Faulkner
- Cinematography: Gerry Floyd
- Edited by: Maria Valente
- Production company: Honeymooner Ltd.
- Distributed by: Soda Pictures
- Release date: 25 June 2010 (EIFF)
- Running time: 75 min
- Country: United Kingdom
- Language: English
- Budget: £48,000

Honeymooner is a 2010 British Comedy drama independent film. The film was written and directed by Col Spector. The film premiered at Edinburgh International Film Festival on 6 June 2010 and released on 20 January 2011 in UK.

== Plot ==
Twenty-nine-year-old clothing importer Fran Goldman (Gerard Kearns) offered his fiancée everything – including his heart and a two-bedroom penthouse flat in Kentish Town. Unfortunately she didn't want them - so four weeks before their wedding she called it off. Deciding to stay in London rather than honeymoon on his own, Fran remains convinced that she'll see the error of her ways and change her mind. But when he bumps into her with her new boyfriend any dreams he might have had of a reconciliation are dashed. He has no choice but to try to move on and meet someone new.

He is aided in his search by his sometimes neurotic friends Ben (Chris Coghill) and Jon (Al Weaver) who seem to be suffering from the opposite of Fran's predicament – their girlfriends are mad about them, whilst the guys appear lukewarm about their girls. So, not entirely altruistically, Ben and Jon collaborate with Fran in several failed attempts to pick up women. These include a trawl for talent at a rabbi's house and a case of mistaken sexuality when two women that the guys pick up assume that they're gay. Fran very soon gets to hit rock bottom. Will he ever find salvation? And might salvation be found closer to home than he ever realised?

== Cast ==
Actor	Role
Gerard Kearns	Fran
Daisy Haggard	Jess
Chris Coghill	Ben
Al Weaver	Jon
Montserrat Roig de Puig	Celine
Wunmi Mosaku	Seema
Lisa Faulkner	Emma

== Production ==
Talking about the film Spector said that "I bumped into a friend of mine on the day he was meant to get married. His fiancee had called it off a couple of weeks before. So it started with this idea that this guy was giving a woman everything he thought she wanted: commitment and love and a nice apartment, and she turned him down. And he was dumbfounded. I thought that was an interesting starting point for a story." He further added "I also wanted a male character that was upright and sensible, it’s so boring to see more loutish men."

Filming took place in North London, England and ended in the schedule of 17 days.

== Reception ==
Honeymooner received mostly positive reception from critics. The review aggregator Rotten Tomatoes claims 67% of critics have given the film positive reviews. Ian Freer of Empire called the film a "A real, authentic look at love and commitment" and added that "There are no big dramas or laughs. Instead it offers a level-headed look at love, male friendships, commitment-phobia and knowing when you’re ready to move on. Grounding itself in a London far more recognisable than anything Richard Curtis has done, it’s a generous but incisive look at Brit blokedom, crapness and all." Philip French of guardian also gave the film a very positive review, highlighting that "It reminded me of Graham Fellows's 1978 novelty song celebrating self-pity, "Jilted John". Quite a pleasant memory." Allan Hunter of express gave 3 out of 5 stars and said "A modest look at love and friendship but Spector manages to tell it with a generous heart and a sharp-eye for what makes relationships tick."

However, Leslie Felperin of Variety criticized the direction but praised the performance of Kearns "Thesping from some of the supporting characters is a little stilted and under-directed, but casting directors would be wise to check out Kearns in particular, managing to inject some charisma into his passive, schlubby role, while Haggard also impresses with sharp comic timing. Serviceable tech credits bespeak obvious microbudget, and take no interesting risks."
