= The Persuasionists =

British BBC TV sitcom 2010

- Genre: Sitcom
- Created by: Jonathan Thake
- Directed by: Tristram Shapeero
- Starring: Iain Lee; Simon Farnaby; Adam Buxton; Jarred Christmas; Daisy Haggard
- Country of origin: United Kingdom
- Original language: English
- No. of series: 1
- No. of episodes: 6

Production
- Executive producers: Iain Morris; Damon Beesley
- Running time: 30 minutes
- Production company: Bwark Productions

Original release
- Network: BBC Two
- Release: 13 January – 17 February 2010

The Persuasionists is a sitcom broadcast on BBC Two set in the world of advertising starring Iain Lee, Simon Farnaby, Adam Buxton, Jarred Christmas and Daisy Haggard, and featuring Natalie Gumede (amongst others). It was the sitcom writing debut for Jonathan Thake, best known until then for ‘the slag of all snacks’ campaign for Pot Noodle. The Persuasionists premiered on Wednesday 13 January 2010.

Bwark Productions (creators of The Inbetweeners) produced the series, Iain Morris and Damon Beesley were the executive producers and Tristram Shapeero directed. Andrew Collins acted as script editor.

== Synopsis ==
The sitcom focuses on the lives of five overpaid and underworked employees at fictional advertising agency HHH&H.

== Reception ==
The first episode received generally negative critical reviews from the press with critics suggesting that while the cast showed promise, they were let down by a poor script, bad direction and poor characterisations. Some held out hope that future episodes might improve; however, even after further airings, critical response remained negative, with heavy editing and excessive use of canned laughter blamed in part for the show 'not working'.

Half-way through the series, the show was moved to a "graveyard" slot at 11.20pm, due to below-average ratings and poor reviews from the press and bloggers. It was not renewed for a second series.

== The Scum Also Rises ==
The project began in 2007 as a pilot for BBC Three called "The Scum Also Rises", which starred Chris Barrie and Kevin Bishop. A second unbroadcast pilot was produced in 2008. The show had been through many changes by the time that the full series aired in 2010, including an almost complete re-cast.

== Sources ==
- Curtis Brown Literary and Talent Agency http://www.curtisbrown.co.uk/tft/client/user1231/
- Taylor Herring PR http://www.taylorherring.com/blog/index.php/tag/jonathan-thake/
