= Back to Life (TV series) =

2019 British TV drama series

- Genre: Comedy drama; Dark comedy
- Written by: Laura Solon; Daisy Haggard
- Directed by: Christopher Sweeney; Ella Jones
- Starring: Daisy Haggard; Geraldine James; Richard Durden; Adeel Akhtar; Jo Martin; Jamie Michie; Christine Bottomley; Liam Williams
- Composer: Solomon Grey
- Country of origin: United Kingdom
- Original language: English
- No. of series: 2
- No. of episodes: 12

Production
- Executive producers: Sarah Hammond; Harry Williams; Jack Williams
- Producer: Debbie Pisani
- Cinematography: Ben Wheeler
- Editor: Gavin Buckley
- Running time: 23–25 minutes
- Production company: Two Brothers Pictures

Original release
- Network: BBC Three (series 1); BBC One (series 2)
- Release: 15 April 2019 – 31 August 2021

Back to Life is a British dark comedy-drama television series co-written by Laura Solon and Daisy Haggard, who also portrays the lead character, Miri. The show premiered on BBC One on 15 April 2019. The first series received critical acclaim; many reviews highly praised Haggard’s performance and writing.

In November 2019, Back to Life was renewed for a second series; it premiered in August 2021 to similar positive reviews. In October 2023, it was announced that Haggard had decided not to proceed with a third series; she commented, "I think the story is done. I've got so many things I want to do, I've got two or three film ideas that I'm really excited about."

== Plot ==
Miri Matteson has just returned home to Hythe, Kent, after serving an 18-year prison sentence. As Miri attempts to rebuild her life, she forms a friendship with Billy, who cares for an elderly woman next door.

== Cast ==
- Daisy Haggard as Miri Matteson
- Geraldine James as Caroline Matteson, Miri's mother
- Richard Durden as Oscar Matteson, Miri's father
- Adeel Akhtar as Billy, Miri's budding love interest
- Jo Martin as Janice, Miri's parole officer
- Jamie Michie as Dom, Miri's now married pre-prison boyfriend and Caroline's secret affair
- Christine Bottomley as Mandy, Miri's now married pre-prison best friend
- Juliet Cowan as Tina, local policewoman who was Miri’s childhood enemy
- Imogen Gurney as Lara, Miri's former best friend
- Liam Williams as Nathan, Miri's boss at the fish and chip shop (series 1)
- Souad Adel Faress as Anna, Billy's wife (series 1)
- Frank Feys as Samuel, a private investigator (series 1)
- Ade Edmondson as John Boback, Lara’s father (series 2)
- Lizzy McInnerny as Norah Boback, Lara’s mother (series 2)
- Meera Syal as Gaia, Billy's mum (series 2)

== Episodes ==
Series	Episodes	Originally released	
Series	Episodes	First released	Last released
1	6	15 April 2019	15 April 2019
2	6	31 August 2021	31 August 2021

=== Series 1 (2019) ===
No. overall	No. in series	Title	Directed by	Written by	Original release date
1	1	"Episode 1"	Christopher Sweeney	Daisy Haggard and Laura Solon	15 April 2019
Miri Matteson is released from prison after serving 18 years for murder and returns to her hometown where she is shunned by the entire community.
2	2	"Episode 2"	Christopher Sweeney	Daisy Haggard and Laura Solon	15 April 2019
3	3	"Episode 3"	Christopher Sweeney	Daisy Haggard and Laura Solon	15 April 2019
4	4	"Episode 4"	Christopher Sweeney	Daisy Haggard and Laura Solon	15 April 2019
5	5	"Episode 5"	Christopher Sweeney	Daisy Haggard and Laura Solon	15 April 2019
6	6	"Episode 6"	Christopher Sweeney	Daisy Haggard and Laura Solon	15 April 2019

=== Series 2 (2021) ===
No. overall	No. in series	Title	Directed by	Written by	Original release date
7	1	"Episode 1"	Ella Jones	Daisy Haggard and Laura Solon	31 August 2021
8	2	"Episode 2"	Ella Jones	Daisy Haggard and Laura Solon	31 August 2021
9	3	"Episode 3"	Ella Jones	Daisy Haggard and Laura Solon	31 August 2021
10	4	"Episode 4"	Ella Jones	Daisy Haggard and Laura Solon	31 August 2021
11	5	"Episode 5"	Ella Jones	Daisy Haggard and Laura Solon	31 August 2021
12	6	"Episode 6"	Ella Jones	Daisy Haggard and Laura Solon	31 August 2021

== Production ==
Harry and Jack Williams are the executive producers of Back to Life with Sarah Hammond. They previously produced the BBC show Fleabag.

Various scenes for both series were filmed in Hythe and Lydd-on-Sea in Kent. Dungeness features in Series One and Folkestone Harbour Arm doubles as the Pier and Lighthouse in Series Two. The Abbot's Cliff sound mirror in Dover, on top of the White Cliffs of Dover, features in both series.

== Release ==
Back to Life was launched as a boxset on BBC iPlayer on 15 April 2019, and began broadcast weekly on BBC One from 15 April 2019. The complete second series was launched on BBC iPlayer on 31 August 2021 and the first episode premiered on BBC One the same night before being broadcast weekly for the remainder of the series.

On 10 November 2019, the series premiered in the United States on Showtime.

== Reception ==
For the first series, review aggregator website Rotten Tomatoes reported a 100% approval rating with an average rating of 8.4/10, based on 26 critic reviews. The website's critics consensus reads, "Driven by the marvelous Daisy Haggard, Back to Life questions what it means to be a person with humor, heart, and a genuine sense of surprise." The first series was also compared positively to critically acclaimed tragicomedy Fleabag with which it shares producers. Metacritic, which uses a weighted average, assigned a score of 88 out of 100 based on 14 critics, indicating "universal acclaim".

For the second series, Rotten Tomatoes reported a 100% approval rating with an average rating of 8.8/10, based on 5 critic reviews. Metacritic assigned a score of 87 out of 100 based on 6 critics, indicating "universal acclaim".

== Home media ==
Title	Release date			Distributor
Title	Region 1 DVD	Region 2 DVD	Region B Blu-ray	Distributor
Season 1	22 August 2023	1 July 2019	1 July 2019	Spirit Entertainment
Season 2	22 August 2023	25 October 2021	TBA	Dazzler Media
