= Tooty's Wedding =

- Directed by: Frederic Casella
- Written by: Ben Willbond; Laura Solon
- Produced by: Frederic Casella; Ben Willbond
- Starring: Ben Willbond; Laura Solon; Daisy Haggard; Mathew Baynton
- Cinematography: Steve Gray; Sasha Snow
- Edited by: Michael Duxbury
- Production company: Hoot Comedy
- Release date: December 2010
- Running time: 19 minutes
- Country: United Kingdom
- Language: English

Tooty's Wedding is a 2010 short comedy film, written by Perrier Award Winners Ben Willbond and Laura Solon and directed by Frederic Casella. It was screened as part of the 2012 Sundance Film Festival, having been selected from a record 7,675 submissions.

A feature-length version of the short film, in which "a young couple's marriage hilariously hits the rocks during a weekend wedding in the country" won awards at the Rhode Island International Film Festival (RIIFF), LA ShortsFest 2011, Aesthetica Short Film Festival and New York Friar’s Club is now in development.

== Reception ==
- Winner – Grand Prize for Best Comedy at the Rhode Island International Film Festival
- Winner – Jury prize for Best Short at the Friars Club Film Festival
- Winner – Best Comedy at Aesthetica Short Film Festival 2011
- Winner – Award of Merit – Accolade Competition 2011
- Official selection for the Los Angeles International Short Film Festival
