= Iliza Shlesinger =

American comedian and actress (born 1983)

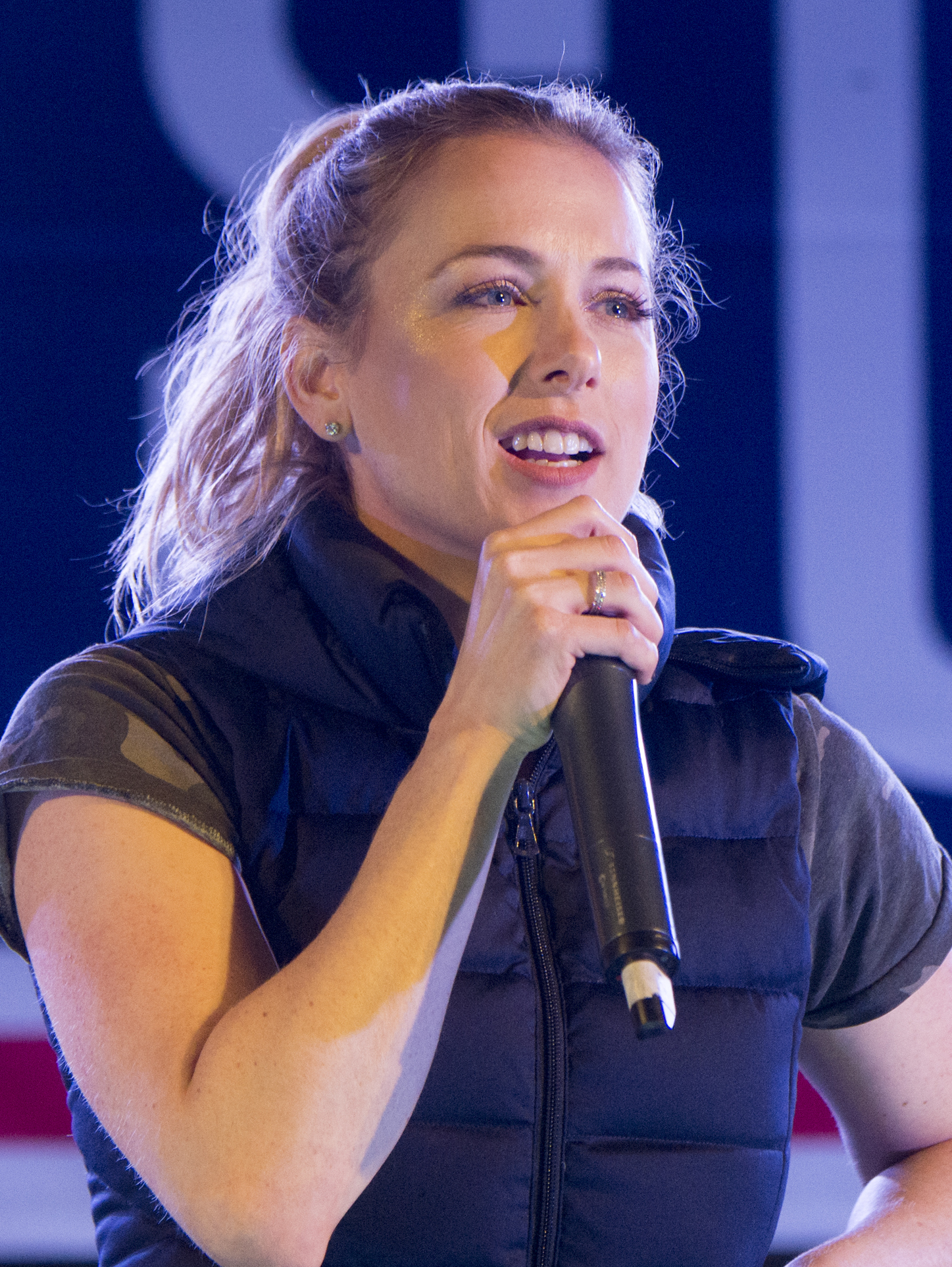
- Shlesinger in 2017 on stage
- Born: February 22, 1983 (age 43); New York City, U.S.
- Education: Emerson College
- Occupation: Comedian; actress; television host
- Spouse: Noah Galuten (m. 2018)
- Children: 2
- Website: Official website

Iliza Vie Shlesinger (/ɪˈlaɪzə ˈʃlɛsɪŋɡər/ il-EYE-zə SHLESS-ing-gər; born February 22, 1983) is an American stand-up comedian, actress and television host. She has released six comedy specials on Netflix. She was the 2008 winner of NBC's Last Comic Standing and went on to host the syndicated dating show Excused from 2011 to 2013. She has hosted the TBS game show Separation Anxiety.

In 2017, Shlesinger hosted her own late-night talk show called Truth & Iliza on Freeform. Her sketch comedy show The Iliza Shlesinger Sketch Show premiered on Netflix in April 2020.

== Early life ==
Iliza Vie Shlesinger was born on February 22, 1983, in New York City to a Jewish family. She was raised in Dallas, Texas, where her family moved when she was a baby. She attended the private Greenhill School in Addison, Texas, where she studied Spanish and participated in the school's improvisation team.

Shlesinger studied at the University of Kansas for one year, and participated in the Semester at Sea program. She transferred to Emerson College in Boston, Massachusetts, where she majored in film. There, she became a member of one of the campus's comedy sketch groups, Jimmy's Traveling All Stars.

== Career ==
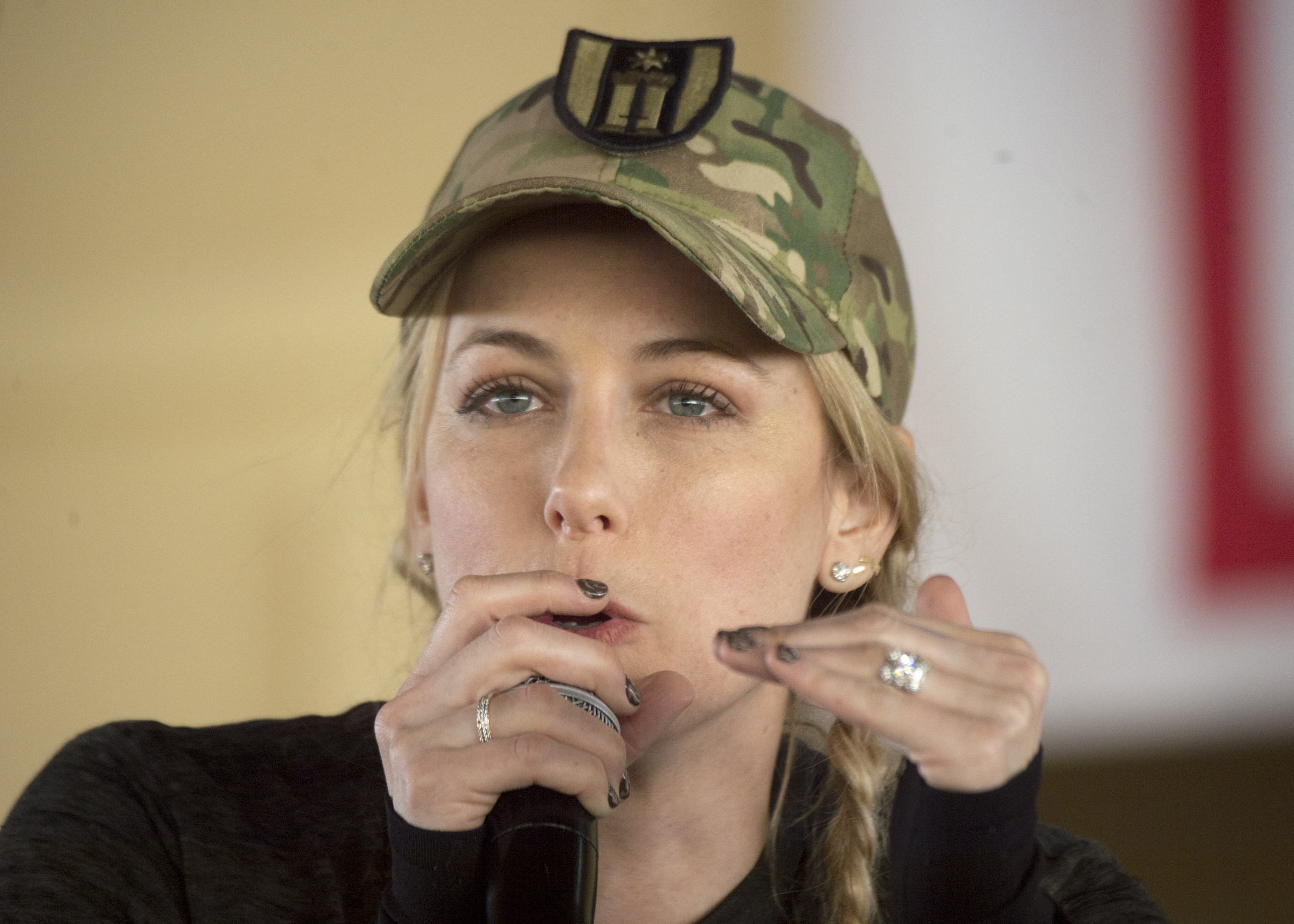
Shlesinger performing in 2017

Shlesinger performed with the ComedySportz Dallas, and after graduating from Emerson, moved to Los Angeles to pursue stand-up comedy.

In 2007, Shlesinger won Myspace's So You Think You're Funny contest, and was featured as the G4 network's Myspace Girl of the Week. In 2008, she became the first woman, and the youngest, winner of NBC's Last Comic Standing, in the series' sixth season. She was twice selected by other comedians to compete in the head-to-head eliminations, winning each time. She appeared in The Last Comic Standing Tour. At 25 she became a headline touring comedian.

Shlesinger worked with Lewis Black to contribute to Surviving the Holidays, a History Channel holiday special, and narrated the 2009 documentary Imagine It!² The Power of Imagination. In 2010, she released an on-demand comedy video, Man Up and Act Like a Lady, and an on-demand comedy album, iliza LIVE, on her website, via The ConneXtion. Around the time of these releases, Shlesinger appeared in a business comedy video series for Slate.

Shlesinger hosted The Weakly News on TheStream.tv from July 2007 to April 2012. She also hosted Excused, a syndicated American reality-based dating competition series, which ran from 2011 to 2013. She co-starred in the 2013 film Paradise. As of April 2023, she was continuing an advice podcast called Truth and Iliza, which she began in August 2014. Featuring celebrity guests and personal friends, the semi-weekly podcast was a forum for discussing matters which bother her and those on the show, with a punk theme song performed by Being Mean to Pixley.

Shlesinger was comic co-host of StarTalk Radio Show with Neil deGrasse Tyson for season 7, episode 12 titled Cosmic Queries: Galactic Grab Bag on May 20, 2016. On July 13, 2016, the ABC's streaming service premiered Shlesinger's "new short-form digital comedy series", Forever 31. The series was created, written, and executive produced by, and starred Shlesinger. A late night show for Shlesinger was placed into development in September 2016 for the cable channel Freeform. Truth & Iliza began airing on May 2, 2017, and ran for six episodes.

In March 2024, through the Auckland High Court in New Zealand, Shlesinger successfully liquidated a New Zealand production company 'Stripe Studios (Comedy)' for a payment that she was owed. Stripe Studios (Comedy) is a subsidiary of the larger 'Stripe Media Group' which was owned by British New Zealand producer Alex Breingan. The larger company was also put into liquidation, owing large amounts of money to debtors and actors, including David Hasselhoff. In 2026, the show Shlesinger and chef husband Noah Galuten worked on with Stripe Studios was released with SBS Food under a different production company who rescued the show, called This Tastes Funny with Iliza Shlesinger.

In October 2026, Shlesinger received the Trailblazer Award for special achievement at the San Diego International Film Festival.

=== Netflix ===
Shlesinger's first comedy album and video, War Paint, was recorded on December 1, 2012, at The Lakewood Theater in Dallas, Texas, and released on Netflix on September 1, 2013. Her second stand-up special, Freezing Hot, was recorded in Denver, Colorado, and premiered on Netflix on January 23, 2015. Her third Netflix stand-up special, titled Confirmed Kills, was recorded at The Vic Theatre in Chicago, Illinois, and premiered on Netflix on September 23, 2016. Her fourth Netflix stand-up special, Elder Millennial, was recorded aboard USS Hornet, at the USS Hornet Sea, Air & Space Museum in Alameda, California, on February 23, 2018, and premiered on Netflix on July 24, 2018. Her fifth Netflix stand-up special, Unveiled was recorded in Nashville and premiered on Netflix on November 19, 2019.

Shlesinger also stars in the March 2020 Netflix film Spenser Confidential, and The Iliza Shlesinger Sketch Show, which premiered April 1, 2020.

Shlesinger played Anita Weiss in the 2020 film Pieces of a Woman. She starred, wrote, and executive produced the romantic comedy film Good on Paper, which premiered on Netflix on June 23, 2021. The movie was based on a true story of an experience with an ex-boyfriend.

Her sixth stand-up comedy special Iliza Shlesinger: Hot Forever premiered on Netflix in October 2022.

=== Amazon Prime ===
Shlesinger's first comedy special for Amazon Prime, "A Different Animal," was recorded at the Eccles Theater in Salt Lake City and debuted March 11, 2025. It is listed as the first part of a series for the streaming service.

=== Other television credits ===
Shlesinger's television credits include E! Network's Forbes Celebrity 100, TV Guide's America's Next Top Producer, Comedy Central Presents, John Oliver's New York Stand Up Show, Byron Allen's Comics Unleashed, and History Channel's History of a Joke. Shlesinger also had her own show on GOTV's mobile network.

=== Writing ===
On November 7, 2017, Weinstein Books published Shlesinger's book Girl Logic: The Genius and the Absurdity with an introduction by Mayim Bialik. Shlesinger published her second book, All Things Aside: Absolutely Correct Opinions, on October 11, 2022.

== Politics ==
Shlesinger describes herself as liberal, and has spoken publicly in support of abortion rights, trans rights, and the Black Lives Matter movement. She is a vocal supporter of Israel, signing an open letter by Creative Community for Peace following the October 7 attacks in 2023, which called for the entertainment community to stand with the nation as "it defends itself against a terrorist regime in Gaza that seeks Israel's destruction." Later that month, Shlesinger wrote an article in The Hollywood Reporter denouncing the rise in antisemitism following the attack, and claiming that "if Israel put down their guns, no one else would, and there would be no more Israel." In January 2024, Shlesinger, Chelsea Handler, and Mayim Bialik spearheaded a fundraiser for the organization United Hatzalah of Israel.

== Personal life ==
In December 2017, it was reported that Shlesinger was being sued by a man who had been denied admission to one of her shows which was for female-only audiences. The initial complaint was dismissed and then refiled as a class action suit (Pollister v. Schlesinger). While a notice of settlement was filed by the plaintiff of the class action suit in March 2021, details of any settlement have not been revealed.

Shlesinger married chef Noah Galuten on May 12, 2018, in a Jewish ceremony in Los Angeles. They had a daughter in 2022, and a son in 2024.

== Video works ==
=== Comedy specials ===
Year	Title	Distributor
2013	War Paint	Netflix
2015	Freezing Hot	Netflix
2016	Confirmed Kills	Netflix
2018	Elder Millennial	Netflix
2019	Unveiled	Netflix
2022	Iliza Shlesinger: Hot Forever	Netflix
2025	Iliza Shlesinger: A Different Animal	Amazon

=== Television ===
Year	Title	Role	Notes
2016	Forever 31	Veronica	Mini-series. Stars, also creator, written by, and executive producer.
2017	Girlboss	Veronica	Episode: "Top 8"
2020	The Iliza Shlesinger Sketch Show	Various roles	
2020	Crank Yankers	Herself	Episode: "Adam Carolla, Iliza Schlesinger & Demetri Martin"
2020	Robot Chicken	Dr. Liz Wilson / Realtor	Voice role; episode: "Max Caenen In: Why Would He Know If His Mother's a Size Queen"
2020	The Comedy Store	Herself	
2021	Bosch	IA Lt. Kristine Klotz	Episode: "Workaround"
2022	Dollface	Herself	Episode: "Space Cadet”
2022	Celebrity Jeopardy!	Herself	2 episodes
2023	The Righteous Gemstones	Shay Marigold	
2026	This Tastes Funny with Iliza Shlesinger	Herself	

=== Film ===
Year	Title	Role	Notes
2013	Paradise	Carol	
2018	Instant Family	October	
2019	Iliza Shlesinger: Over And Over	Self	Documentary
2020	Spenser Confidential	Cissy	
2020	Pieces of a Woman	Anita Weiss	
2020	The Opening Act	Val	
2021	The Right One	Kelly	
2021	Hysterical	Herself	Documentary film
2021	Good on Paper	Andrea Singer	Performer, writer, executive producer
2021	Supercool	Victoria	
2026	Chasing Summer	Jamie	Also writer, producer
