= Excused =

- Genre: Reality; Dating Competition
- Created by: David Garfinkle; Jay Renfroe
- Presented by: Iliza Shlesinger
- Theme music composer: Devin Powers
- Country of origin: United States
- Original language: English
- No. of seasons: 2
- No. of episodes: 230

Production
- Executive producers: David Garfinkle; Jay Renfroe
- Production locations: Encino, California (taping location)
- Camera setup: Videotape; Multi-camera
- Running time: 19.5 minutes
- Production companies: Renegade 83 Productions; CBS Television Distribution

Original release
- Network: Syndication
- Release: September 12, 2011 – September 6, 2013

Excused is an American dating reality-based competition series that debuted in first-run syndication in the United States and Canada on September 12, 2011. The half-hour series is hosted by comedian Iliza Shlesinger and created by David Garfinkle and Jay Renfroe for Renegade 83 Productions (the same company that produced Blind Date) and CBS Television Distribution.

The series, which is primarily syndicated to stations affiliated with Fox, CW, CBS, MyNetworkTV and to independent stations for broadcast in late fringe and access time periods, is the first dating series (along with Entertainment Studios-produced Who Wants to Date a Comedian?, which debuted the same month) to air in first-run syndication since the 2006 cancellations of Blind Date and Elimidate.

On April 19, 2012, CBS Television Distribution announced that Excused would be renewed for a second season, which began on September 10, 2012, but it would also be its last as the series ended its run in September 2013 after 230 episodes.

== Format ==
The series utilizes a house in the Los Angeles County city of Encino as its setting for this program.

=== Dating ===
In the first round, two contestants (either two males or two females; for the second season, episodes in which male contestants choose female suitors are less commonly seen) are introduced and are asked by host Shlesinger about what they look for in a mate. Originally, the contestants then had to decide which potential suitors that they wanted to let in by watching a feed from a security camera located outside the front door of the house to give their first impression by explaining why they should be given the chance to date the contestants; often, Shlesinger will give snarky commentary to the potential suitors whether they are chosen to enter the house or not. This round was eliminated beginning in the second season and four suitors are chosen before the show for the contestants to choose from, though Shlesinger's commentary was retained as an element.

Once four potential suitors are chosen, the two contestants then view video dating profiles to determine based on their personality and other personal details they reveal as to which two people they will choose to go on to the third round (starting with season two, the contestants' decision whom to excuse in this round and the additional eliminations shown thereafter are now only revealed once that person is announced to have been eliminated, instead of being first revealed by the contestants to Shlesinger shortly beforehand). The group of four is cut down to two remaining potential suitors, who then will go out on dates with the two contestants. The two contestants then will decide which of the two remaining suitors will go on to go out on a one-on-one date with each of the contestants, in which the contestant has to impress their date, before the suitor decides which one of the two contestants they choose to go out on a second date.

==== Changes in the initial rounds ====
In the first season, the contestants would travel by van to different locations in Los Angeles for the first four dates. In some episodes, the elimination from four to three contestants would take place at the location of the dates in a face-to-face encounter. In other episodes, all eliminations would take place back at the Excused house with the eliminations being announced by Shlesinger over a speaker. The final two dates took place in the Excused house, and one of these final dates would frequently be a hot tub date.

For the second season, all dates featured in each episode are taped in the Excused house; as such, all four daters are initially seen together before the first two one-on-one pairings go off on separate dates around the premises. The series also introduced a designated "private room" within the house, that includes hidden cameras within the room, in which contestants take their dates to a more intimate setting.

=== The Courtyard ===
The show culminates with each contestant choosing whether to meet their suitor in the courtyard of the house. The suitor will go to the courtyard and wait for his or her prospective partner to join him or her. Joining the other outside signifies that the contestants both want to pursue a relationship; contestants who choose they do not want to pursue a relationship with the remaining suitor (either due to the lack of a romantic connection or simply because the contestant sought to be the one chosen and had no actual intention of pursuing a relationship with the suitor), will not appear in the courtyard.
