= The Meredith Vieira Show =

American syndicated talk show (2014–2016)

- Genre: Talk show
- Directed by: Adam Heydt
- Presented by: Meredith Vieira
- Starring: Everett Bradley (bandleader)
- Narrated by: Jon Harris
- Country of origin: United States
- Original language: English
- No. of seasons: 2
- No. of episodes: 290

Production
- Executive producers: Rich Sirop; Meredith Vieira; Michael Glantz
- Production locations: Studio 6A, NBC Studios, New York City
- Camera setup: Multi-camera
- Running time: 42 minutes
- Production companies: Meredith Vieira Productions; NBCUniversal Television Distribution

Original release
- Network: Syndication
- Release: September 8, 2014 – May 20, 2016

The Meredith Vieira Show is an American talk show that was hosted by Meredith Vieira and produced by NBCUniversal Television Distribution. It premiered on September 8, 2014, and was airing in syndication. The second and final season premiered on September 8, 2015.

NBCUniversal canceled the show after two seasons because of low ratings. The final show aired on May 20, 2016.

== Production ==
In July 2013, NBCUniversal Television Distribution ordered The Meredith Vieira Show, with a fall 2014 premiere.

Everett Bradley served as show's band leader before the band was removed, with Jon Harris as announcer. The Meredith Vieira Show was sold to local stations in 98% of the United States. NBCUniversal Television renewed the show for a second season. By season two, the show switched to a live format and a new panel segment called What's Hot Now! was moderated by Vieira and took up a large portion of each episode; the panelists were Lance Bass, Lilliana Vazquez, Yamaneika Saunders, and Megan Colarossi.

The show originated from Studio 6A at NBC's Rockefeller Center headquarters, previously the home to the network's Late Night.

On January 5, 2016, NBCUniversal announced that it was not renewing the show, citing a ratings decline, downgrades from local stations, and Vieira's work schedule. Vieira noted in a statement, "I am so sorry to see our show come to an end after this season, but I am also incredibly proud of the work our staff has done and forever grateful to our supportive viewers," and added, "We promise to spend our final weeks producing the best broadcast we know how. And have a blast doing so!"
