= Who Wants to Date a Comedian? =

- Genre: Reality; Dating competition
- Created by: Byron Allen
- Country of origin: United States
- Original language: English
- No. of seasons: 2

Production
- Executive producers: Byron Allen; Carolyn Folks; Scott Satin
- Producers: Jennifer Lucas; Kristen Valkingburg; Peter A. Steen; Beth Polsky; Greg Harvey Talent Producer: C. Dusean Williams
- Production locations: Los Angeles, California (taping location)
- Camera setup: Videotape; Multi-camera
- Running time: 20 minutes
- Production company: Entertainment Studios

Original release
- Network: Syndication
- Release: September 19, 2011 – present

Related
- Comics Unleashed with Byron Allen; Comedy.tv

Who Wants to Date a Comedian? is an American reality-based dating competition series that debuted in first-run syndication in the United States on September 19, 2011. The half-hour series was created by Byron Allen through his production company Entertainment Studios (which also produces numerous other syndicated programs including Comics Unleashed and Comedy.tv).

The series, which is primarily syndicated to stations affiliated with Fox and to independent stations (in addition to airing on ES-operated cable television network Comedy.tv), for broadcast in access, late fringe and graveyard time periods, is among the first dating series (along with CBS Television Distribution's Excused, which debuted one week earlier and has featured some contestants who have also appeared on this program) to air in first-run syndication since the 2006 cancellations of Blind Date and Elimidate. The series' second season debuted on September 17, 2012.

== Premise ==
The series uses a format similar to other elimination-based reality dating shows and plays on the notion and common preference of single people that a sense of humor is key to pursuing and sustaining a romantic relationship by having stand-up comics as the contestants choosing between three people vying to go on a date with them. The show periodically features routines performed by the comics appearing on the program during each episode, either from footage taped at Los Angeles area comedy clubs or clips originally featured on fellow Entertainment Studios-produced series Comics Unleashed and Comedy.tv.

=== Format ===
In the first round, a stand-up comic is introduced and informs the viewers about what they look for in a mate. The audience is then introduced to the three potential suitors through video profiles, which often feature interspersed footage of the contestant engaging in leisure activities. The comic then meets the suitors (usually three women for a male comic, though episodes in which a female comedian having to choose between three male suitors occur on occasion); the dates are often held in simpler, though common locales for a date compared to most reality dating series (ranging from a home to an amusement park to a bowling alley, with entire episodes often set in one location).

After the comic is introduced to the contestants, the contestants give their first impressions to the comic. Following that, the comedian and all three contestants go out on a date, which often results in the comedian finding out other personal details about their dates, so as to determine based on their personality and their revelations as to who will be eliminated from the competition. All of the contestants will often end up doing fun activities during the date while impressing them. The group of three is cut down to two remaining potential suitors, whom the comic will then continue the date with for the third and final round, in which the contestant has to impress their date. The show culminates with the comedian deciding which of the two remaining suitors will go on to go out with them on a second date.
