= Iliza Shlesinger: Confirmed Kills =

- Directed by: Bobcat Goldthwait
- Written by: Iliza Shlesinger
- Starring: Iliza Shlesinger
- Distributed by: Netflix
- Release date: September 23, 2016 (Netflix)
- Running time: 77 minutes
- Country: United States
- Language: English

Iliza Shlesinger: Confirmed Kills is a 2016 American stand-up comedy film directed by Bobcat Goldthwait and written by and starring Iliza Shlesinger. It serves as Shlesinger's third stand-up comedy special for Netflix, following War Paint from 2013 and Freezing Hot from 2015. In Confirmed Kills, Iliza talks about the Party Goblin, mermaids, ugly giants, Shark Tank and more.

== Cast ==
- Iliza Shlesinger

== Release ==
It was released on September 23, 2016 on Netflix.
