= Flatbush Misdemeanors =

- Genre: Comedy
- Created by: Kevin Iso; Dan Perlman
- Written by: Kevin Iso; Dan Perlman
- Directed by: Justin Tipping
- Starring: Kevin Iso; Dan Perlman; Kristin Dodson; Hassan Johnson
- Country of origin: United States
- No. of seasons: 2
- No. of episodes: 20

Production
- Executive producers: Kevin Iso; Dan Perlman; Nastaran Dibai; Richard Allen-Turner; Jon Thoday; Chloe Pisello; David Martin; Justin Tipping
- Editor: Matthew Booras
- Camera setup: Single
- Production companies: Avalon Television; Showtime Entertainment

Original release
- Network: Showtime
- Release: May 23, 2021 – August 21, 2022

Flatbush Misdemeanors is an American comedy television series created by Kevin Iso and Dan Perlman. It is based on Iso and Perlman's 2017 digital series of the same name. In October 2020, it was given a straight-to-series order by Showtime. The series premiered on May 23, 2021. In August 2021, the series was renewed for a second season, which premiered on June 19, 2022. In September 2022, the series was canceled after two seasons.

== Premise ==
A raw and grounded comedy about city life, the show follows Dan and Kevin, who play characters struggling to thrive in their new surroundings in the brash environment of Flatbush, Brooklyn. The show explores two longtime friends seeking to climb out of their heads and connect with others.

== Cast and characters ==
=== Main ===
- Kevin Iso as Kevin, a broke painter from the South, struggling to figure out how to make a living. However, he keeps bumping his head. In the first season, he lives on Dan's couch and delivers food for a local roti shop.
- Dan Perlman as Dan Joseph, a fish-out-of-water public school teacher with a fondness for Xanax. Dan manages depression, addiction, and an unlikely new stepdad, Kareem. In the first season, he also helps coach his school basketball team, the Beauford Delaney Pigeons.
- Hassan Johnson as Drew Hill, a bold and direct man who is extremely protective of his loved ones. Drew's demands come into conflict with the livelihoods of both Kevin and Dan.
- Kristin Dodson as Zayna Bien-Aime, Drew’s niece. She’s strong and independent and one of Dan’s outspoken high school students.
- Kareem Green as Kareem, a confident man, thrilled to be Dan's new step-dad. The owner of Kareem's Larry's Bike Shop in Flatbush, Kareem serves as Dan’s self-appointed guide to the neighborhood.

=== Recurring ===
- Maria Bamford as Maria, Dan's mom. Odd, upbeat, with mental health issues, Maria used to be emotionally dependent on Dan. Today, she's happier than she's ever been thanks to new husband Kareem. Maria's newfound joy with Kareem is confusing to Dan.
- Kerry Coddett as Jasmine
- Sharlene Cruz as Jess
- Napoleon Emill as Blue, Drew's friend and business associate. Blue hopes to be a professional Untitled Goose Game player.
- Jackie Fabulous as Miss Venestine
- Sticky Fingaz as Anthony, Zayna's father.
- Sam Jay as Georgia, Kevin's older sister. Georgia is a successful music producer and the clear favorite to their parents.
- Alyssa Limperis as Sydney, a Narcotics Anonymous participant who befriends Dan.
- Zuri Reed as Dami, Zayna's best friend in the first season. Dami is the daughter of a Nigerian nurse and a Haitian minister. Dami does not appear in the second season, as it's revealed that her parents sent her to live in Africa for the year.
- Yamaneika Saunders as Dr. Flowers, Dan's therapist. Dr. Flowers knits during sessions and has no patience for Dan.
- Lenny Venito as Franklin, Dan's sponsor in Narcotics Anonymous.
- Zoe Winters as Nancy, the administrator of Kevin's art fellowship in the second season. She views herself as an ally to the black community.
- Roy Wood Jr. as Principal Douglass, the Principal at Beauford Delaney High School. Douglass has little energy for Dan's missteps, but has few other staffing options, so he tolerates Dan.

=== Guest ===
- Greer Barnes as Lawyer
- Elaine Bromka as Barry's Mother
- Joyelle Johnson as Nneka
- Cody Kostro as Terry
- Imani Lewis as Honor
- Christopher Paul Richards as White Marcus
- Ali Siddiq as Bishop
- Dan Soder as Ben
- Ikechukwu Ufomadu as Roosevelt

== Episodes ==
=== Series overview ===
Season	Episodes	Originally released	
Season	Episodes	First released	Last released
1	10	May 23, 2021	August 1, 2021
2	10	June 19, 2022	August 21, 2022

=== Season 1 (2021) ===
No. overall	No. in season	Title	Directed by	Written by	Original release date	US viewers (millions)
1	1	"leanin'"	Justin Tipping	Kevin Iso & Dan Perlman	May 23, 2021	N/A
Longtime friends Kevin and Dan struggle to thrive in their new surroundings in Flatbush, Brooklyn; when Kevin spills a local drug dealer's stash while on a food delivery, both their lives are thrown into unexpected upheaval.
2	2	"vortex"	Justin Tipping	Kevin Iso & Dan Perlman	May 30, 2021	0.130
Zayna deals with a rumour while Kevin deals with delivering on his first freelance painting job; Dan prepares to attend Jess's birthday party.
3	3	"the chicken or the egg"	Justin Tipping	Kevin Iso & Dan Perlman	June 6, 2021	N/A
When Kevin and Dan's jazz musician neighbor faces eviction, Kevin enlists Jasmine to organize a protest; Dan anxiously dreads an after-school meeting with Jess to discuss a case in which he expects to be fired for his ties to Drew and Zayna.
4	4	"retrograde"	Nefertite Nguvu	Kerry Coddett	June 13, 2021	N/A
Kevin spends a 'shrooms-filled night out with his successful sister which leads to a series of revelations; in an effort to make Dan bond with his stepdad, Dan's mum drags him into competing in the Greenest Block in Brooklyn contest.
5	5	"dub"	Nefertite Nguvu	Chuck Hayward	June 20, 2021	0.063
Dan vies for a position as head coach of his school's basketball team; Kevin has an encounter with Drew that begins a shift in their dynamic; Zayna, suspended from the dance team for her fight with Dami, has to deal with the consequences.
6	6	"bad connection"	Nastaran Dibai	Chris Case	June 27, 2021	N/A
Dan and Kevin's growing roommate tensions coincide with an ongoing fight between their new neighbors; when Dan struggles to have much-needed Zoom therapy with his brutally honest therapist, she manages to resolve everyone's issues simultaneously.
7	7	"lockdown"	Brennan Shroff	Anna Salinas	July 11, 2021	N/A
When the school goes on lockdown due to a bomb threat, Dan moves to help Jess defuse the situation while Zayna learns a shocking secret about her family through Dami. Meanwhile, Kevin meets with a gallery owner, who gives his work an honest review.
8	8	"lakay"	Nefertite Nguvu	Kerry Coddett & Kevin Iso	July 18, 2021	N/A
Zayna finds out the truth about what happened with her father, and she falls out with her uncle, Drew, and runs away. Meanwhile, Drew is looking for Zayna, and she goes to her teacher, Jess' apartment and finds her and Dan together, and stays there overnight.
9	9	"breaking"	Brennan Shroff	Chris Case & Nastaran Dibai	July 25, 2021	0.055
After breaking protocol, Dan and Jess face consequences at their job. Kevin discovers Dan lied to him about Zayna. Fracture between two longtime friends drives Kevin to seek Drew's friendship. It all culminates in a tragic circumstance.
10	10	"peace"	Nefertite Nguvu	Chuck Hayward & Dan Perlman	August 1, 2021	N/A
After a shocking tragedy, Dan and Kevin argue about the merits of their friendship. Zayna, who's staying at Dami's house to avoid Drew, faces a decision about her future. A final turn leaves all of their futures in question. Note: This episode ends on multiple cliffhangers

=== Season 2 (2022) ===
No. overall	No. in season	Title	Directed by	Written by	Original release date	US viewers (millions)
11	1	"return"	Brandon Dermer	Dan Perlman	June 19, 2022	0.045
Dan seeks to clear his reputation so he can be reinstated as a teacher, but Kevin has left town and is ignoring his calls; Drew struggles to get Zayna back in school.
12	2	"obiageli"	Brandon Dermer	Kevin Iso	June 26, 2022	0.029
Kevin returns home until the trouble in Flatbush dies down.
13	3	"and to think i saw it on snyder ave"	Brandon Dermer	Kerry Coddett	July 3, 2022	0.042
Drew gets frustrated as Zayna continues to flex her independence; Kevin returns to Flatbush to start his art fellowship; Dan gets acquainted with his NA group, then has a run-in with Drew that leads to unexpected consequences.
14	4	"switzerland"	Meredith Dawson	Keith Heisler	July 10, 2022	0.060
Zayna discovers the downside of living on her own and the responsibility that comes with it; Kevin and Dan's professional lives are put on hold when they attend the funeral of an old friend.
15	5	"boomerang"	Dan Perlman	Keith Heisler	July 17, 2022	0.035
Dan finally feels comfortable in NA, connecting with Sydney, until a surprise turns Dan's safe space upside-down; Kevin struggles to navigate the politics of his art fellowship; Drew's release from jail comes at a high price.
16	6	"sandcastles"	Jordan Kim	Kerry Coddett	July 24, 2022	0.021
Kevin is forced to confront Drew for the first time since returning to Flatbush; Zayna fears she may be losing her new boyfriend, Desmond; Dan and Sydney flirt with breaking the unwritten rule of NA.
17	7	"scorpions and frogs"	Jordan Kim	Fran Richter	July 31, 2022	0.058
Drew and Zayna try to repair their relationship after visiting her dad in jail; Kevin and Dan find themselves entangled in the mess that is Kareem and Maria's love life; Dan wrestles over whether to finally share his secret to Kevin.
18	8	"hot potato"	John Lee	Nneka Samuel	August 7, 2022	0.045
Zayna promises to help Amaya stay out of trouble. Dan attempts to control his Sex Ed class to pass his teacher evaluation. Drew finds his way into Kevin's art world once he decides to get out of the drug business once and for all.
19	9	"boiling point"	John Lee	Dan Perlman & Saeed Crumpler	August 14, 2022	0.026
Kevin's connection to Drew jeopardizes his art fellowship; family obligations put Desmond and Zayna's relationship to the test; Dan agrees to help Drew find legit employment, until revelations between Dan, Drew and Sydney change everything.
20	10	"memento mori"	John Lee	Kevin Iso & Drew Dowdey	August 21, 2022	0.010
Drew is determined to settle the score with Dan now that he knows the truth. Kevin finds out his fate with the art fellowship. Zayna's world is upended when her dad is unexpectedly released from prison. Season finale.

== Production ==
=== Development ===
On October 12, 2020, Showtime ordered Flatbush Misdemeanors to series, with a ten episode, straight-to-series order. On August 24, 2021, Showtime renewed the series for a second season. On September 14, 2022, Showtime canceled the series after two seasons.

=== Casting ===
On March 12, 2021, Kristin Dodson was cast as a series regular in the series. On March 25, 2021, Hassan Johnson joined the series.

== Release ==
=== Broadcast ===
Flatbush Misdemeanors premiered on May 23, 2021, on Showtime. The first episode was made available online for free on YouTube, as well. The first episode of the second season premiered on Showtime's streaming platform on June 17, 2022, then debuted on television on June 19.

=== International ===
The show premiered simultaneously in Spain on Movistar Plus+ under the title Buscarse la vida en Brooklyn. Both seasons aired on Crave in Canada, premiering in May 2021. The series premiered in the United Kingdom on August 12, 2021, on Sky UK. On October 13, 2021, Sky Comedy released the series in Germany, Switzerland, and Austria as Willkommen in Flatbush, Brooklyn. Across sub-Saharan Africa, including Ghana, the series debuted on Showmax in April 2022.

== Reception ==
The show has received mostly positive reviews, with Robert Daniels of RogerEbert.com describing it as "a hilarious, unforced two-hander that feels totally fresh." The New York Times called Flatbush Misdemeanors "really funny." Flatbush has also been praised for its authentic portrayal of the neighborhood. Variety commended the "richly drawn world", while TV Guide described the show as "Old Brooklyn through and through, but still speaks for this generation" and "already one of the best shows of 2021". Upon the show's premiere in the UK, The Guardian commended the show as "fresh and thrilling."
