= Laura Solon =

English screenwriter, comedian and actress

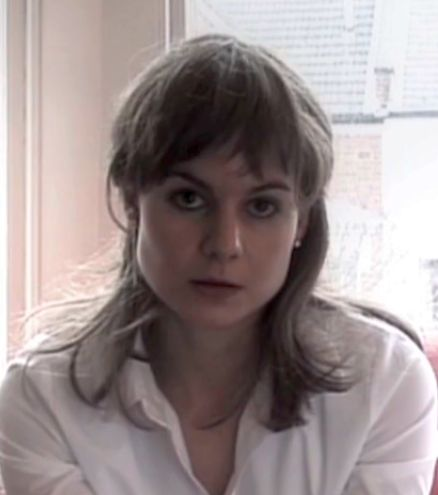
- Solon in a 2009 comedy sketch
- Born: Laura Madalene Solon; 1978 or 1979 (age 47–48)
- Notable work: Man Stroke Woman; Laura Solon: Talking and Not Talking; Laura, Ben and Him; Harry & Paul; Al Murray's Multiple Personality Disorder

Comedy career
- Years active: 2004–present
- Medium: Television, theatre, radio
- Genres: Sketch comedy, stand-up, comedy films

Laura Madalene Solon (born 1978 or 1979) is an English screenwriter, comedian, actress, and winner of the 2005 Perrier Comedy Award. She was the second woman to win as a solo performer, after Jenny Eclair in 1995.

== Background ==
Solon was raised in Great Kimble near Aylesbury. She attended Downe House School followed by Worcester College, Oxford where she received a scholarship to read English and started writing and performing in the Oxford Revue.

== Career ==
Solon tried being a stand up comedian but found character comedy suited her better.

In 2005 she won the Perrier Award for her one-woman Edinburgh Fringe show Kopfraper's Syndrome: One Man and His Incredible Mind. Following this the BBC and Channel 4 were keen to acquire her to produce material for them, and in April 2006 it was announced by the BBC that Solon had been signed to develop projects for them on radio and TV.

The first series of Laura Solon: Talking and Not Talking, a sketch and character comedy series, ran on BBC Radio 4 in January 2007. The second series ran in June 2008, and the third in November 2009.

She recorded a BBC sitcom pilot from the creators of People Like Us, featuring Man Stroke Woman's Daisy Haggard, called Great News.

She appeared in Harry Enfield and Paul Whitehouse's sketch show Ruddy Hell! It's Harry and Paul, broadcast from 2007 on BBC One. She was seen in a sketch show for ITV2 Laura, Ben and Him (2008) with Marek Larwood and Ben Willbond. She was part of Al Murray's Multiple Personality Disorder, shown on ITV1.

Alongside Tony Hawks and Angus Deayton she appeared in the feature film Playing the Moldovans at Tennis, which was recorded in 2010 and released in 2012.

In the first half of 2010 she toured with Rabbit Faced Story Soup, a play set in a publisher's office in which she played every character. It contained characters from her radio show, Talking and Not Talking, including Carol Price, a divorcee children's author, and Gwynneth the inept call centre worker. New characters included Marcia, an American super publishing agent.

Her award-winning 2010 short film Tooty's Wedding, which Solon co-wrote with Ben Willbond, was screened as part of the 2012 Sundance Film Festival.

In 2011 Solon was one of the players in the BBC Two improvisational show Fast and Loose, hosted by Hugh Dennis.

=== Screenwriter ===
Solon has adapted comedy film screenplays for movies such as Office Christmas Party, and has had original screenplays (Work It and Bodyguards) optioned by Bluegrass Films. Solon has also written episodes for the fifth and sixth seasons of Hot in Cleveland.

== Works ==
=== Kopfraper's Syndrome: One Man and His Incredible Mind ===
The title is a holdover from an entirely different show that Solon had planned to perform with a male partner. When the partner dropped out she rewrote the show in the three weeks leading up to the festival but retained the title in order not to negate the value of the advance publicity or confuse those who had already purchased tickets.

Solon plays eight different characters in the show, which consists of sketches of varying lengths, including:

- An Andrew Lloyd Webber fan
- Caroline, an Australian disabled housewife who is possessed by the ghost of Diana, Princess of Wales
- Karen, a prize-winning beautician
- Borgesia, a Polish story-teller
- A wedding planner from Rotherham
- A hunter who does not believe in zebras
- Katrina, a corporate high-flier with an irrational terror of the Chinese
- A marketing assistant forced to dress as a bookworm

As a Perrier award-winning show it secured a run in London's West End, at the Soho Theatre, in November 2005. Solon also received £7,500 with the prize.

=== Radio ===
- Ed Reardon's Week – Lucy, in Series 3
- Laura Solon: Talking and Not Talking (2007–09)
- Frank Skinner on Absolute Radio – (2009–12)
- Dave Gorman on Absolute Radio – Stand-in for Danielle Ward (2010)

=== Television ===
- Learners (2007)
- Ruddy Hell! It's Harry and Paul (2007–2012, performer and additional material)
- Laura, Ben and Him (2008)
- Al Murray's Multiple Personality Disorder (2009)
- Have I Got News for You (2010)
- Fast and Loose (2011)
- Hot in Cleveland (2010–2015, writer, six episodes)
- Back to Life (2019, writer)

=== Film ===
- Office Christmas Party (2016, writer)
- Let It Snow (2019, writer)
- Bad Day (2026, screenwriter)

=== Other drama ===
- Orbis (Doctor Who Audio) - Selta (Big Finish) (2009)
