= Daisy Haggard =

British actress and writer (born on March 22, 1978)

- Born: 22 March 1978 (age 48); London, England
- Education: London Academy of Music and Dramatic Art
- Occupations: Actress, writer
- Years active: 1996–present
- Spouse: Joe Wilson
- Children: 2
- Parent(s): Piers Haggard; Anna Sklovsky
- Family: Haggard

Daisy Haggard (born 22 March 1978) is an English actress and writer. She gained prominence through her roles in the BBC sitcoms Uncle (2014–2017) and Episodes (2011–2017). With Laura Solon, she co-wrote and starred in the BBC Three comedy-drama Back to Life (2019–2021). For her performance in the FX series Breeders (2020–2023), Haggard received a British Academy Television Award nomination in 2021 for Best Comedy Actress. She also voiced Johanna in the award winning animated series, Hilda (2018–2023).

== Early life and education ==
Daisy Haggard was born on 22 March 1978, the daughter of film director Piers Haggard and Australian painter Anna Sklovsky. A member of the Haggard family, her grandfather was the actor Stephen Haggard, and her great-great-great-uncle was the author Sir Henry Rider Haggard.

She was raised in Dulwich, South London, where she attended James Allen's Girls' School. She later attended the London Academy of Music and Dramatic Art.

== Career ==
In 1996, Haggard made her acting debut in an episode of ITV crime drama, The Ruth Rendell Mysteries. The episode was directed by her father, and during the auditions, the producer stated that he wanted to audition Daisy, despite opposition from her father, who did not want his daughter to become an actor.

Haggard later graduated from the London Academy of Music and Dramatic Art. She appeared in the BBC Three sketch show Man Stroke Woman, and in the Channel 4 sitcom Green Wing as Emmy. She also made an appearance in an episode of Peep Show, playing a nurse who examines Mark Corrigan's testicles, and in the BBC Two comedy Psychoville by Reece Shearsmith and Steve Pemberton.

In the 2008 adaptation of Sense and Sensibility, Haggard portrayed the role of Miss Steele, the sister of Lucy Steele.

In 2009, she played Donna Mitchell in an episode of the BBC crime drama Ashes to Ashes.

Haggard was also the voice of the Ministry Lift in Harry Potter and the Order of the Phoenix and Harry Potter and the Deathly Hallows – Part 1.

In 2010, she appeared in the CBC television film Abroad, playing Poppy Young. She also starred in the independent British film Honeymooner.

Haggard played Sophie in the Doctor Who episode "The Lodger", a role she reprised in "Closing Time".

In 2011, she began appearing in the BBC/Showtime comedy Episodes. She portrayed the role of Myra Licht until the series ended in 2017.

In 2012, she starred in the short film Tooty's Wedding, which was later screened at the 2012 Sundance Film Festival.

Haggard also appeared on the stage, including at the National Theatre and as the title character in Gina Gionfriddo's play Becky Shaw at the Almeida Theatre.

In July 2012, Sky One began airing the series Parents, in which Haggard played the role of Chrissie.

In 2013, she co-starred with Rose Byrne in the British romantic comedy I Give It a Year as Helen. In 2014, she was cast as Sam in the BBC comedy Uncle. In 2016, she appeared in "Nosedive", an episode of the anthology series Black Mirror.

In 2017, she appeared in the premiere production of Consent at the Royal National Theatre, London.

From 2018 to 2023 Haggard was the voice of Johanna on the Netflix animated series Hilda.

In April 2019, Haggard began playing the lead role of Miri Matteson in BBC Three sitcom Back to Life. The first series, consisting of six episodes, premiered on 15 April 2019 and was followed by a second series in 2021. She also co-wrote and created the series. In 2020 Haggard appeared in the comedy-drama Breeders as Ally.

She plays one of the leads in the 2023 series Boat Story alongside Paterson Joseph.

In 2025, she will direct and co-star in a new thriller series on Channel 4 known as Maya, co-leading with Bella Ramsey. Reuniting with her Hilda co-star, she stated that "Ever since I first dreamt up this show, there has only ever been one Maya. I wrote the part with Bella so clearly in my head and I honestly still can’t believe they want to be part of it. Bella is pure magic, just insanely talented, and I can’t wait for us to work together."

== Personal life ==
Haggard is married to musician Joe Wilson and has two daughters.

== Filmography ==
=== Film ===
Year	Film	Role	Director	Notes
2002	Club Le Monde	Jan	Simon Rumley	
2002	Max	Heidi	Menno Meyjes	
2002	Nicholas Nickleby	Juliet in play	Douglas McGrath	
2007	Hard to Swallow	Katie's Sister	Mat Kirkby	Short film
2007	Don't		Edgar Wright	Short film
2007	Harry Potter and the Order of the Phoenix	Ministry Lift (voice)	David Yates	
2007	Prada & Prejudice	Woman	Tom Edmunds	Short film Also producer
2010	A Good Life	Daughter	Rowan Athale	Short film
2010	Honeymooner	Jess	Col Spector	
2010	Harry Potter and the Deathly Hallows – Part 1	Ministry Lift (voice)	David Yates	
2011	Swinging with the Finkels	Lesbian #1	Jonathan Newman	
2011	Tooty's Wedding	Tooty	Fred Casella	Short film
2012	Sell by Date		Emma Savage	Short film
2013	I Give It a Year	Helen	Dan Mazer	
2013	Calloused Hands	Debbie	Jesse Quinones	
2016	Exploitation Exploitation Exploitation	Christie	Dan Susman	Short film
2016	The Way Back	Faye	John Carlin	Short film
2016	Charlie Cloudhead	Audrey	Rupert Cresswell	Short film
2018	Songbird	Olivia	Jamie Adams	
2021	Hilda and the Mountain King	Johanna (voice)	Andy Coyle	
TBA	Chocolate Cake	D'Arcy	Jeremy Wooding	

=== Television ===
Year	Title	Role	Notes
1996	The Ruth Rendell Mysteries	Spinny Crossland	9.01 "Heartstones: Part One"; 9.02 "Heartstones: Part Two"
2001	My Family	Dental assistant	2.02 "The Unkindest Cut"
2001	Swivel on the Tip	Various characters	1.01 "Pilot"
2002	Clocking Off	Sophie	3.02 "Tasha's Story"
2002	The Dwarfs	Virginia	Television film
2003	Manchild	Helen	2.02 Series 2, Episode 2; 2.08 Series 2, Episode 8
2003	Hardware	Sarah	1.05 "Women"
2003	Peep Show	Practice Nurse	1.06 "Funeral"
2003	Ready When You Are, Mr. McGill	Maggie	Television film
2004	Green Wing	Emmy	4 episodes
2004–2005	The Lenny Henry Show	Detective Sergeant Anderson	2 episodes
2004	The Last Chancers	Rachel	1.04 Series 1, Episode 4
2005	Casanova	Coquette 1	1.02 "Episode Two"
2005–2006	Comedy Lab	Sarah	7.02 "Speeding"; 8.04 "FM"
2005–2007	Man Stroke Woman	Various characters	12 episodes
2006–2008	The KNTV Show	Kierky / Kierkegaard	14 episodes
2006	New Street Law	Becky Crosby	1.06 "Episode Six"
2006	Saxondale	Desiree	1.03 "Episode Three"
2006	Housewife, 49	Jill	Television film
2006	Great News	Emma Brooks	1.01 "Pilot"
2007	The Scum Also Rises	Emma	Television film
2007	Ronni Ancona & Co	Various characters	3 episodes
2008	Sense & Sensibility	Miss Steele	Television miniseries
2009	Ashes to Ashes	Donna Mitchell	2.06 "Episode 6"
2009–2011	Psychoville	Debbie Hart	8 episodes
2010	The Persuasionists	Emma	6 episodes
2010	Abroad	Poppy Young	Television film
2010–2011	Doctor Who	Sophie	5.11 "The Lodger"; 6.12 "Closing Time"
2011–2017	Episodes	Myra Licht	26 episodes
2011	Midsomer Murders	Fran Carter	14.03 "Echoes of the Dead"
2011	Night and the Doctor	Sophie	1.05 "Up All Night"; Uncredited
2011	Outnumbered	Charlene	4.07 "Christmas Special"
2012	Parents	Chrissy	6 episodes
2012	Full English	Eve (voice)	1.01 "Britain's Got Bloodmonkey"; 1.02 "Mangina"
2012	4Funnies	Sam	1.04 "Uncle"
2014–2017	Uncle	Sam	20 episodes
2014	Original Drama Shorts	Sarah	1.03 "Tag"
2014	Cardinal Burns	Debbie	2.05 Series 2, Episode 5
2015	Ballot Monkeys	Christine Proctor	5 episodes
2016	Black Mirror	Bets	3.01 "Nosedive"
2018	Hang Ups	Jane Ross	3 episodes
2018–2023	Hilda	Johanna (voice)	21 episodes
2018	The Guardians		Television film
2019–2021	Back to Life	Miri Matteson	Also writer and executive producer
2020–2023	Breeders	Ally	Main role
2022	Inside No. 9	Lara	7.4 Kid/Nap
2023	Star Wars: Visions	Dorota Van Reeple (voice)	2.04 "I Am Your Mother"
2023	Boat Story	Janet	Main role
2026	Maya	Anna	Main role, writer, and co-director
