= Yamaneika Saunders =

American comedian and writer

- Born: Aberdeen, Maryland, U.S.
- Notable work: Life & Beth; Inside Amy Schumer; Hacks

Comedy career
- Medium: Stand-up; television; podcast
- Genres: Observational comedy; Blue comedy; improvisation
- Subjects: Religion; race relations; dating; everyday life
- Website: www.yamaneika.com

Yamaneika Saunders is an American stand-up comedian, actress and television writer. She is best known for her stand-up specials on Netflix and Comedy Central as well as her roles on Life & Beth and Flatbush Misdemeanors. Saunders is a WGA Award-winning writer for her work on the writing staff of Inside Amy Schumer.

== Early life ==
Saunders is from Aberdeen, Maryland. At the age of 15 she moved to Los Angeles to attend the Los Angeles County High School for the Arts, where she studied theater, and she began performing stand-up comedy in Los Angeles.

== Career ==
=== Stand-up ===
Saunders has performed at the Just For Laughs festival in Montreal and is a regular at the Comedy Cellar in New York City and Las Vegas.

In 2014, Saunders competed on the eighth season of Last Comic Standing on NBC, appearing in the semi-final round. Her half-hour Comedy Central Stand-Up Presents premiered in 2017. She was featured in the first season of the Netflix stand-up showcase The Degenerates. Reviewing the series for Paste, Garrett Martin called Saunders a "New York-based powerhouse" whose "enthusiastic and aggressive cadence" carried material that other performers could not have landed. She recently released a stand-up special, White Shenanigans.

=== Television ===
In 2015, Saunders was a cast member of Funny Girls, an Oxygen docu-series following six female comedians in Los Angeles.

As an actress, Saunders played Maya on Amy Schumer's Hulu series Life & Beth. Discussing the role, Saunders said Schumer encouraged her to "bring your humor to whatever is happening" and incorporated her improvised material into the show.

Saunders also had a prominent role as the therapist Dr. Flowers on the Showtime comedy Flatbush Misdemeanors.

Saunders has guested on sitcoms Broad City, The Jim Gaffigan Show, Survival of the Thickest, and Hacks. She has also appeared on talk shows like Last Week Tonight with John Oliver, The Meredith Vieira Show, and recurring correspondent segments on The Tonight Show Starring Jimmy Fallon.

Saunders wrote for Inside Amy Schumer which won a Writers Guild of America Award. She has also written for That Damn Michael Che and The Eric Andre Show.

=== Podcasting ===
In 2024, Off Topic with Yamaneika premiered on Kevin Hart's Laugh Out Loud Radio on SiriusXM, airing Tuesdays through Thursdays.

In July 2026, Chelsea Handler and iHeartPodcasts launched the Dear Chelsea Network with You're the Problem … with Yamaneika, a weekly show hosted by Saunders executive produced by Handler.

== Filmography ==
=== Television ===
Year	Title	Role	Notes
2014	Last Comic Standing	Herself	Contestant, season 8
2015	Funny Girls	Herself	Main cast
2017	Comedy Central Stand-Up Presents	Herself	Stand-up special; season 1, episode 3
2018	The Degenerates	Herself	Stand-up special; season 1
2021-2022	Flatbush Misdemeanors	Dr. Flowers	Season 1-2
2022	Inside Amy Schumer		Writer
2022	That Damn Michael Che		Writer, season 2
2022–2024	Life & Beth	Maya	Season 1-2

== Awards and nominations ==
Year	Award	Category	Nominated work	Result
2023	Writers Guild of America Award	Comedy/Variety – Sketch Series	Inside Amy Schumer	Won
