= Extraordinary Extensions =

- Presented by: Tinie Tempah
- Country of origin: United Kingdom
- Original language: English

Production
- Running time: 1 hour (including adverts)

Original release
- Network: Channel 4
- Release: 20 October 2021 – present

Extraordinary Extensions is a Channel 4 television series presented by Tinie Tempah.
