= Adam DeVine: Best Time of Our Lives =

2019 Netflix stand-up comedy special

- Written by: Adam Devine
- Directed by: Jay Karas
- Starring: Adam Devine
- Country of origin: United States
- Original language: English

Production
- Running time: 58 minutes

Original release
- Network: Netflix
- Release: June 18, 2019

Adam DeVine: Best Time of Our Lives is a 2019 Netflix stand-up comedy special by American comic Adam DeVine, his first stand-up special for Netflix. In Best Time of Our Lives, directed by Jay Karas in Adam's hometown of Omaha, Adam DeVine talks about teen awkwardness, celebrity encounters, his "Pitch Perfect" audition and more.

== Release ==
It was released on June 18, 2019, on Netflix streaming.
