= Lee Nelson's Well Good Show =

British television series

- Title card
- Genre: Sketch show Stand-up comedy
- Written by: Simon Brodkin
- Directed by: Peter Orton; Rebecca Rycroft; Adam Wimpenny
- Presented by: Simon Brodkin
- Starring: Terry Noble; Kathy Berry; Ben Willbond
- Theme music composer: Dizzee Rascal – "Flex" (instrumental)
- Country of origin: United Kingdom
- Original language: English
- No. of series: 2
- No. of episodes: 15

Production
- Executive producers: Richard Allen-Turner; Jonn Thoday
- Producer: Spencer Millman
- Editor: Graham Barker
- Running time: 30 minutes
- Production company: Avalon Television

Original release
- Network: BBC Three
- Release: 10 June 2010 – 13 October 2011

Related
- Al Murray's Multiple Personality Disorder; Lee Nelson's Well Funny People

Lee Nelson's Well Good Show is a British comedy sketch show, written and presented by Simon Brodkin and produced by Avalon Television for BBC Three. It featured Brodkin hosting a studio based show as his comedy character Lee Nelson, a happy-go-lucky chav, and also featured television sketches of Brodkin's other comedy characters.

== Production ==
The BBC commissioned the show in 2009. Written by Brodkin, it was produced by Avalon Television.

== Cast ==
- Lee Nelson, Dr. Bob, Jason Bent & Chris Young – Simon Brodkin
- Omelette – Terry Noble
- Nan – Kathy Berry

== Characters and sketches ==
The programme consists of Brodkin (in character as Nelson throughout) hosting a studio show before an audience, which includes audience interaction, games (which contain unusual prizes, such as a pair of sunglasses, a victory belt and a tree), and features involving the characters Omelette, and Nelson's nan. The programme also includes inserted recorded sketches featuring three other characters also portrayed by Brodkin: due to time limitations, in some episodes only two insert sketches would feature, though in others all three would appear. The insert sketches are:

- 110% Bent, a spoof of fly-on-the-wall celebrity documentaries featuring Brodkin as the bland and unintelligent Premiership footballer Jason Bent, who was briefly a Manchester City player;
- Hospital Life, a parody of daytime medical documentaries, featuring Brodkin as the insensitive 'Dr. Bob';
- Faliraki Nights, a spoof of late-evening 'nightlife' documentaries. This features Brodkin as holiday rep Chris Young, and includes narration by former BBC Three continuity announcer Lola Buckley (who also voices the introduction to 110% Bent)

Some of the characters have appeared previously in Brodkin's earlier TV work: sketches featuring the Jason Bent character appeared in Al Murray's Multiple Personality Disorder, an Avalon production first broadcast on ITV1 in 2009; these featured Murray as a sports reporter conducting post-match interviews with Bent. The same Al Murray series also featured the Lee Nelson character in a run of comic monologues. In 2008, the Dr. Bob character had appeared (as 'Dr. Omprakash') in BBC Three comedy showcase series The Wall.

== Reception ==
Despite popular appeal, the show has received mainly negative reviews from critics. Liam Tucker of TV Pixie writes, 'Lee Nelson's Well Good Show is less 'well good' and more a pile of irredeemable crap littered with witless demi-jokes, all limping along on the questionable talent of Simon Brodkin. Presumably someone at BBC Three saw that he looks a little like Kevin Bishop, noticed that Ali G hasn't been around for the best part of a decade and calculated success on that shaky basis.' Stuart Heritage of The Guardian remarks in an article concerning the justification behind Television Show names that 'BBC3's Lee Nelson's Well Good Show suffers from the fact that it's almost the exact scientific opposite of well good.' Despite the negative reviews, ratings were such that the BBC commissioned a second show, Lee Nelson's Well Funny People.

== DVD release ==
A DVD was released on 22 August 2011 entitled The Complete Series 1. "Lee Nelson Live" was also released on 19 November 2012 featuring a live stand-up routine from Lee Nelson's live 2012 stand-up tour.

== Transmissions ==
Series	Episodes	Originally released	
Series	Episodes	First released	Last released
1	7	10 June 2010	22 July 2010
2	8	25 August 2011	13 October 2011

== Episode list ==
=== Series 1 (2010) ===
No.	Title	Directed by	Written by	Original release date	Viewers	Audience share
1	Episode 1	Peter Orton and Adam Wimpenny	Simon Brodkin	10 June 2010	501,000	3%
2	Episode 2	Peter Orton and Adam Wimpenny	Simon Brodkin	17 June 2010	521,000	N/A
3	Episode 3	Peter Orton and Adam Wimpenny	Simon Brodkin	24 June 2010	N/A	N/A
4	Episode 4	Peter Orton and Adam Wimpenny	Simon Brodkin	1 July 2010	711,000	4.4%
5	Episode 5	Peter Orton and Adam Wimpenny	Simon Brodkin	8 July 2010	612,000	5%
6	Episode 6	Peter Orton and Adam Wimpenny	Simon Brodkin	15 July 2010	N/A	N/A
7	Episode 7 (highlights special)	Peter Orton and Adam Wimpenny	Simon Brodkin	22 July 2010	N/A	N/A

=== Series 2 (2011) ===
No.	Title	Directed by	Written by	Original release date	Viewers	Audience share
8	Episode 1	Peter Orton and Rebecca Rycroft	Simon Brodkin	25 August 2011	602,000	3.6%
9	Episode 2	Peter Orton and Rebecca Rycroft	Simon Brodkin	1 September 2011	462,000	2.7%
10	Episode 3	Peter Orton and Rebecca Rycroft	Simon Brodkin	8 September 2011	416,000	2.6%
11	Episode 4	Peter Orton and Rebecca Rycroft	Simon Brodkin	15 September 2011	530,000	3.5%
12	Episode 5	Peter Orton and Rebecca Rycroft	Simon Brodkin	22 September 2011	523,000	3.5%
13	Episode 6	Peter Orton and Rebecca Rycroft	Simon Brodkin	29 September 2011	434,000	2.8%
14	Episode 7	Peter Orton and Rebecca Rycroft	Simon Brodkin	6 October 2011	491,000	3.3%
15	Episode 8 (highlights special)	Peter Orton and Rebecca Rycroft	Simon Brodkin	13 October 2011	486,000	3.1%
