= Al Murray's Multiple Personality Disorder =

- Created by: Avalon Television
- Directed by: Ben Kellett
- Starring: Al Murray
- Country of origin: United Kingdom
- No. of series: 1
- No. of episodes: 7

Production
- Running time: 25 minutes

Original release
- Network: ITV (not STV)
- Release: 27 February – 12 April 2009

Related
- Lee Nelson's Well Good Show

Al Murray as (left to right) Roger Dennis, Horst Schwul, Wayne Upman, Gary Parsley, Peter Taylor and Barrington Blowtorch

Al Murray's Multiple Personality Disorder is a British sketch show starring comedian Al Murray. The multi character aspect of the show was a departure from Murray's previous television comedy work, as the sole character The Pub Landlord. The show ran from 27 February to 12 April 2009, airing in the Friday night prime time slot on ITV (ITV1 & UTV). STV in Scotland did not broadcast the programme. It was commissioned on 4 June 2008.

== Characters ==
- Ueber bomb führer Horst Schwul (Murray) – A camp, gay, Nazi officer (Schwul being German for gay)
- Barrington Blowtorch – Victorian gentleman thief Barrington Blowtorch (Murray) who talks his way out of trouble when caught by the inspector (Wall) by using unbelievable stories.
- Gary Parsley (Murray) – A demanding, extravagant, flamboyant pop star whose career peaked in the 1970s. He is from Billericay and based on Elton John.
- Peter Taylor (Murray and Eclair) – A husband and wife obsessed with sex who constantly embarrass their daughter and her boyfriend. He has a prominent West Country accent.
- Gay Best Friend (Murray) – Gaz, the Geordie pretending to be gay to get closer to a girl friend.
- Mobile phone shop assistants (Brodkin and Murray) – Two chavs (the cashier and his boss) who epitomise Britain's poor quality of customer service.
- Jason Bent (Brodkin and Murray) – A stereotypical Premier League footballer with a Scouse accent (Brodkin), speaking to the post match interviewer after the game (Murray).
- Duncan's Den' – (Bannatyne as himself, Solon, Murray) A businessman, Duncan Bannatyne, plays himself, looking to invest £1 million in business venture. A parody of Dragons' Den, where the only ever contestant is hapless young divorcée Carole Price, interviewed by host (Murray).
- The Celeb News Tramps – Two homeless people who are up to date on all the celebrity stories as they sleep under tabloid newspapers.
- The PC P.C.s – (several) This spoof of The Bill satirises the excessive political correctness in the British police force.
- Lee Nelson (Brodkin) – A chav walking his dog who philosophises on life.
- The Radio Ad Couple (Murray and Eclair) a couple who only ever converse in the style of radio advertisements.
- Intolerant Vicar (Murray) A vicar who is constantly outraged at the inappropriate untraditional song selection for services.
- Roger Dennis (Murray) A pilot whose pre-takeoff announcements are always inappropriate.
- Big Baby (Murray) A life-size baby as an executive businessman.
- Wayne Upman (Murray) A man who has always had it harder than anybody relating a bad experience to him.

== Writers ==
- Al Murray
- Simon Brodkin
- Mark Augustyn
- John Camm
- Chris England
- Paul Hawksbee
- Tony MacMurray
- Will Maclean
- Daniel Maier
- Matt Simpson
- Laura Solon
- Paul Powell

== Supporting cast ==
- Simon Brodkin
- Jenny Eclair
- Sadie Hasler
- Colin Hoult
- Laura Solon
- Kim Wall
- Katy Wix

== Guest appearances ==
- Rebecca Front – Police boss (ep 1)
- Peter Davison – Doctor (ep 4)
- Michael Winner – self (ep 6)
- Sylvester McCoy – various (ep 6)
- Sally Lindsay – various (ep 6)
- John Barrowman – Camp American Airman (ep 7)

== Critical reception ==
Al Murray's Multiple Personality Disorder provoked considerable controversy, receiving very sharp criticism from some quarters of the press, whilst attracting positive reviews from others. In particular, a scathing review of the show by Tim Teeman was published in The Times, berating the show for its perceived homophobia due to the characterisation of Horst Schwul:

Not only is the stereotype unfunny, another layer of insensitivity is added when you consider that gays died in their thousands under the Nazis, then after the war were persecuted because their sexuality was still criminalised.

— Tim Teeman, The Times.

This view was backed up by The Scotsman, which described the characters as "crass" and "one-dimensional", and describing Schwul as "undoubtedly the worst comedy character in the history of civilisation".

By contrast, the Daily Mirror gave the show a broadly positive review, praising Murray and Eclair's performance as the Radio Ad Couple, and suggesting the show demonstrates that "the spirit of Benny Hill lives on". The Daily Telegraph noted that, whilst "parts of it may be too crude for some tastes... there are some winning ideas", whilst The Independent also enjoyed several sketches.

However, The Stage was disappointed with the show, describing it as "very lazy comedy...dependent upon ridiculous costumes and cod accents to get laughs".
