= Lee Nelson's Well Funny People =

- Genre: Comedy
- Starring: Simon Brodkin
- Country of origin: United Kingdom
- Original language: English
- No. of series: 1
- No. of episodes: 7

Production
- Running time: 30 minutes
- Production company: Avalon Television

Original release
- Network: BBC Three
- Release: 14 March – 26 April 2013

Related
- Lee Nelson's Well Good Show

Lee Nelson's Well Funny People is a British television comedy series starring Simon Brodkin produced by Avalon for BBC Three.

== Episode list ==
No.	Original release date	UK viewers	Audience share
1	14 March 2013	530,000	2.9%
2	21 March 2013	N/A	TBA
3	28 March 2013	N/A	TBA
4	4 April 2013	N/A	TBA
5	11 April 2013	560,000	2.8%
6	18 April 2013	N/A	TBA
7	26 April 2013	N/A	TBA
