= The Iliza Shlesinger Sketch Show =

- Starring: Iliza Shlesinger
- Country of origin: United States
- No. of seasons: 1
- No. of episodes: 6

Production
- Running time: 18 minutes

Original release
- Network: Netflix
- Release: April 1, 2020

The Iliza Shlesinger Sketch Show is an American sketch comedy television series created by and starring Iliza Shlesinger. The series premiered on Netflix on April 1, 2020.

== Episodes ==
No.	Title	Directed by	Written by	Original release date
1	"Episode 1"	Laura Murphy	Kim Gamble	April 1, 2020
A "Jackass" prank show with women ends in tears, "A Star Is Born" goes to the dogs, and handy Mom Alerts warn adult children about potential dangers.
2	"Episode 2"	Laura Murphy	Kim Gamble	April 1, 2020
A mystery at sea emerges when a wife sets sail with her husband. Nicole Kidman's stunt double leaps into acting. Confident women attend a support group.
3	"Episode 3"	Laura Murphy	Kim Gamble	April 1, 2020
Politicians go down the toilet with campaign promises, lesbian chefs serve it up hot, and a concerned family performs a topknot intervention.
4	"Episode 4"	Laura Murphy	Kim Gamble	April 1, 2020
Dinner at a trendy restaurant is dogged by trouble. Honest New Jersey moms offer fashion advice. Pals play the personality party game "It Me!"
5	"Episode 5"	Laura Murphy	Kim Gamble	April 1, 2020
A family resemblance proves undeniable, a cold woman learns how to succeed at the office, and friends make the case for sticking with a TV show.
6	"Episode 6"	Laura Murphy	Kim Gamble	April 1, 2020
A husband volunteers to test his scientist wife's new sex robot. The ladies of daytime talk know things. A star isn't as down-to-earth as she appears.

== Reception ==
The show received mixed reviews. In a mostly positive take for RogerEbert.com, Brian Tallerico wrote of the first season, "Overall, it's a bit of a mixed-bag—so much sketch comedy is, especially in the first season—with some sketches going on way past their breaking point, but there's an unabashed willingness to be ridiculous that marks the best moments in this six-episode run. When Shlesinger latches onto a concept she finds funny, she refuses to let go until she's drained after last morsel of its potential, and her brazen energy can be infectious. […] Iliza Shlesinger may have a show named after her, but it still feels like she’s just getting warmed up." Steve Bennett, writing for Chortle, was more critical: "The lasting impression of this show [...] is of an undercooked brain dump, with Shlesinger's stream of manic ideas needing more editing and focus, even if some of the individual scenes – normally those with one foot in reality – offer laughs and a wry social comment."
