= Man Stroke Woman =

British television sketch comedy series

- Starring: Nick Frost; Amanda Abbington; Ben Crompton; Daisy Haggard; Meredith MacNeill; Nicholas Burns
- Country of origin: United Kingdom
- Original language: English
- No. of series: 2
- No. of episodes: 12

Production
- Running time: 30 mins

Original release
- Network: BBC Three
- Release: 20 November 2005 – 1 March 2007

Man Stroke Woman is a British television comedy sketch show directed by Richard Cantor and produced by Ash Atalla and starring Amanda Abbington, Ben Crompton, Daisy Haggard, Meredith MacNeill, Nicholas Burns and Nick Frost. In addition to being broadcast on digital channel BBC Three in the United Kingdom, all the episodes were available for streaming from the BBC website. Series 2 started in January 2007 and is also available for streaming from the BBC website. All episodes are on the streaming network Pluto TV.

== Format ==
Each episode of Man Stroke Woman involves several sketches, usually around themes of relationships, dating, or sex. The main cast are made up of characters within their early '20s. Five of them are British; MacNeill is Canadian. There is no studio audience or laugh track. Nicholas Burns described the show as "the antithesis of Little Britain", because "we wanted to do something more naturalistic, so if you'd just flicked over by accident you might just think you were watching a funny drama."

MacNeill has said that the format of Man Stroke Woman informed for her later work on Baroness von Sketch Show.

== Reception ==
Chris Riley in The Daily Telegraph summarized the show as "a somewhat uneven but often funny exploration of the routine delusions and disappointments of thirtysomething life."

== Running characters ==
=== Series One ===
- A woman (Abbington) who appears in front of her husband (Burns) wearing an ensemble which includes one ludicrous item of clothing (e.g. a hat which floats six inches above her head or a top emblazoned with red lights spelling out the word "WHORE"). She asks her husband how she looks and he tries to tell her—as tactfully as possible—what is wrong with the outfit: "The dress is... just a little... loud?" She then responds, "You can never just say I look nice, can you?"
- A man (Crompton) who has recently been dumped by his girlfriend (Haggard). He sees her in various locations and, after starting a conversation with her, bursts into tears, and begins to speak unintelligibly through his sobs. The rest of the episode cuts back to this sketch as the ex-girlfriend tries to guess what he's saying.
- Two workers at a cosmetics counter in a department store (Haggard and Abbington), and their boss (MacNeill). A customer will walk up to the counter and ask for assistance. The women behind the counter behave very rudely in a childish fashion (e.g. by repeating what the customer says, or by surreptitiously making rude hand gestures) while trying to hold back their laughter. The customer asks them to stop, and eventually asks to see their manager, who appears and behaves in exactly the same way until the customer walks off.
- A young father (Burns) who is talking to his baby son Josh (who is off-camera) about the activity that they are currently undertaking (e.g. cooking a roast turkey, burying a dead cat, putting bottles in a bottle bank). His wife (Haggard) then appears and asks where Josh is. We then see that in the place where you would expect a baby (e.g. push chair/high chair), is the object that you would expect the initial activity to be performed on (e.g. an uncooked turkey, a dead cat, a pile of bottles, a Rugby ball). The dad then shifts nervously.
- Two friends (Crompton and Frost) are together in public, where they encounter some totally normal activity (e.g. fishing, dancing). Crompton enquires as to what the activity is, and the surprised Frost explains it, clearly disconcerted by his friend's lack of knowledge of this basic activity. Crompton invariably asks when this started, the reply inevitably being, "while back". Further in the conversation, Frost mentions a noun related to this activity, still very mundane (e.g. music, fish), to which Crompton replies "what the fuck is a [noun]?!" The conversation continues for a short while, before Crompton says, "Do I look like an idiot?", and Frost smiles. Each friend thinks the other has been pulling his leg, and Frost is relieved that his friend was just kidding. Then something involving the first activity happens (fish is caught, dancing seen), and Crompton responds with genuine astonishment.
- Two friends (Crompton and Frost) are participating in some unsavoury activity in which they seem out of place (e.g. aerobics, sumo wrestling). After a particularly unpleasant or dull incident, Crompton looks accusingly at Frost and says, "You said there'd be girls here!"
- A man (Burns) who is often asked for things that he doesn't want to give (such as the final figures for his boss (Abbington) from a report he hasn't done, or his mobile number from an annoying girl (MacNeill)). He ends up repeating the number 4 until the right number of digits has been reached. The other party never seems to understand that he is lying.
- A male office worker (Crompton) who brings ridiculous presents to a female co-worker he is hoping to impress (Haggard), based on something she has previously told him. (Such as: she likes minstrels, or she's sick of the fax machine.) The present is invariably something absurd, relating to this, such as an absolutely huge minstrel, or the destroyed fax machine in a box.
- A young couple (Burns and Haggard) who are shopping for their wedding. When they see a product that they like, Burns asks the price. However, when the vendor (MacNeill, Abbington and Frost and Crompton in turn) discovers that the product is required for a wedding, they swap it for an identical 'wedding product' that is a lot more expensive. Burns argues that the wedding product is exactly the same as the ordinary product, and continues to fight with the vendor, until Haggard screams that she wants the wedding product. The vendor then looks sympathetically at Haggard.
- A man (Frost) attempts to perform an apparently simple task (e.g. feeding the dog, tuning in a TV set) while his girlfriend (MacNeill) offers him the instructions provided for such task. After he refuses to read the instructions and starts performing the task, claiming how easy it will be for him to perform such task without any instructions, everything goes unpredictably wrong (the dog explodes, the TV starts leaking water). MacNeill looks back at Frost, handing him out the instructions once more. Frost then says "I think I better have a look at that".
- A woman (played by Haggard, MacNeill and Abbington in turn) is being admired by several men in a particular situation. The woman mentions people who are involved with whatever they are talking about, and eventually mentions her boyfriend, at which point all the men instantly leave (or, on one occasion, faint.)
- Two security guards (Frost and Crompton) who work in a shopping centre and contact one another via their walkie-talkies. In the sketches, Frost contacts Crompton only to clarify that he has his walkie-talkie. After Crompton responds that he also has one, Frost says, 'We are the fucking boys. Over and out.'

=== Series Two ===
- A woman, Karen (Haggard), who phones a police call centre where her friend and flatmate Natasha (Abbington) works, and pretends to need the police. She then recounts a story — usually a thinly-disguised fairy tale — before collapsing in giggles as Abbington figures it out—"This is Karen, isn't it?". Abbington then goes on to another call.
- A couple (Frost & MacNeill) participate in some sexual roleplay, with the woman wearing a different kinky uniform in each sketch. Sadly for him, the woman takes her roleplaying all too seriously (e.g. during a nurse roleplay she informs him that he has cancer), which leads the man to conclude "Jenny, I don't think we should do roleplay any more."
- An office worker (Crompton) is giving a serious presentation about an outlandish idea, apparently under the impression that this is what he's been asked to do. His co-workers eventually put him straight, but not before he's admitted to having already put his plan into action.
- An alcoholic man called Jack (Frost), is out with his 12-year-old nephew, the man is so drunk that he doesn't realise how old the nephew is, and does inappropriate things, such as urinating against the side of his car or goes to inappropriate places such as a stripclub.
- Two people (one of whom is Abbington) are at a playground where their children are playing. Abbington notices something about the other person's child, and comments on it amiably (e.g. "is that your little boy, the one playing on his own?"). The other parent doesn't seem too concerned — until Abbington gives an insight into what life could be like for the child, such as explaining a boy who finds it hard to make friends will go on a killing spree, ending in suicide as a teenager. Upon seeing the look of horror in the other parent's face, Abbington character backtracks, saying "Or — he'll be fine!"
- A male frontman of a fictional band (Burns) is shown introducing a song in a gig, which always seems to have a dark twist about its writing process. The crowd doesn't seem to notice how dodgy his inspiration is, even if he reveals the song to have been written for a man he once ran over, and killed.
- A man (Crompton) is seen offering to help women (Haggard, and in one case, MacNeill) out in various circumstances, e.g. washing the dishes after a meal, or removing a spider. Whilst the woman is facing away from him, she begins a grateful monologue along the lines of, "Most men would expect something in return for this – i.e. SEX. Not you, you're a true friend." This punchline sees Crompton, who has been walking quietly up behind her dressed in a kinky masochistic/BDSM outfit, freeze, then slip away.
- Two friends (Frost & Crompton) are sitting in a pub or club. Frost explains some aspect of male behaviour that he believes women find attractive (e.g. treating them meanly, acting as though you have a dark mystery). He persuades Crompton to approach a woman while exhibiting this kind of behaviour, telling him he's certain to pull. Crompton then goes entirely too far, e.g. shooting a woman in the leg, or telling her that he's committed a murder. Upon realising that he has made a faux pas, he returns to Frost and asks "Too mean?", to which a shocked Frost fervently agrees "Too mean!".
