= Simon Brodkin =

British comedian (born 1977)

- Born: Simon Benjamin Brodkin; 29 September 1977 (age 49); Hampstead Garden Suburb, London, England
- Education: University College School; University of Manchester
- Notable work: Al Murray's Multiple Personality Disorder; Lee Nelson's Well Good Show; Lee Nelson's Well Funny People
- Spouse: Louise Brodkin

Comedy career
- Years active: 2002–present
- Website: www.simonbrodkin.com

Simon Benjamin Brodkin (born 29 September 1977) is an English comedian, performing both on the stand-up circuit and in comedy television series. He is best known for playing a cheerful chav character called Lee Nelson, but also performs as other comedy characters, such as a Liverpudlian footballer called Jason Bent. Performing solo stand-up since 2004, he has also written for and appeared on the television shows Al Murray's Multiple Personality Disorder in 2009, Lee Nelson's Well Good Show in 2010 and Lee Nelson's Well Funny People in 2013.

Brodkin is known for taking part in pranks as his characters at public events, heckling public figures such as Sepp Blatter, Donald Trump and Theresa May.

== Early life ==
Brodkin was born in Hampstead Garden Suburb, London on 29 September 1977. He is Jewish. Brodkin attended the independent University College School, Hampstead, in the London Borough of Camden and studied medicine at the University of Manchester, graduating in 2001. He practised medicine in Manchester city hospitals until 2007, when he began performing stand-up comedy full-time.

== Career ==
=== Stand-up ===
Brodkin performed his first solo comedy show at the Edinburgh Festival Fringe in 2006, titled Simon Brodkin: Everyone But Himself.

In his Lee Nelson stand-up routine, Brodkin's character typically interacts with his audience, telling them about his life, asking them questions, then replying with responses that reflect his world view, his own ignorance or his own stereotypically antisocial attitudes. His act is peppered with slang words.

In character as Lee Nelson, he briefly stood as a candidate in the 2013 South Shields by-election. He withdrew because the BBC would not have been able to broadcast his shows during the electoral campaign due to their code of impartiality.

Brodkin also performs a selection of other characters, including Jason Bent, an unintelligent Premiership footballer with a Merseyside accent. Other characters have included the sleazy and incompetent Dr. Bob.

Brodkin has performed stand-up as himself, touring Troublemaker in 2021 and 2022.

=== Television ===
Brodkin began appearing on television in 2003, in a series of shorts entitled From Baghdad To Balham on Channel 4, playing a recently arrived Iraqi asylum seeker, and twice on Absolutely Fabulous on BBC One.

In 2005, Brodkin appeared as Nelson in three episodes of Channel 4's The Morning After Show, alongside fellow guest Bob Mugabe.

In 2007, Brodkin wrote for and appeared on Al Murray's ITV1 prime time sketch show Al Murray's Multiple Personality Disorder, where he appeared playing his characters of Jason Bent and Lee Nelson, as well as alongside Murray in sketches about mobile phone shop assistants.

In 2008, Brodkin appeared as Dr. Omprakash and Nelson in the BBC Three comedy show The Wall.

In 2011, Brodkin appeared as Lee Nelson in 28 January episode of ITV's Comedy Rocks with Jason Manford and in Heat 3 of Let's Dance for Comic Relief on BBC One. In 2011, Brodkin starred as Clinton Faberge in Channel 4's short-lived comedy strand Another One Bites the Crust. Also in 2011, on 11 November, he appeared as Lee Nelson in BBC One's Live at the Apollo Series seven, episode two, alongside Sean Lock and Ed Byrne.

In 2012, Brodkin returned as Nelson on the judging panel in Heat 4 of Let's Dance for Sport Relief on BBC One, along with Russell Kane and Jo Brand.

In 2013, Brodkin again returned as Nelson in Heat 3 of Let's Dance for Comic Relief on BBC One, dancing with street dance duo Twist and Pulse. He won the "judges' vote", thus performing again in the final. However, he did not win.

In December 2013, Brodkin performed stand-up on John Bishop's Christmas Show on BBC One.

==== Lee Nelson's Well Good Show ====
In 2009, Brodkin was commissioned by the BBC to write his own show for BBC Three. Titled Lee Nelson's Well Good Show, it was broadcast from 10 June 2010 on BBC Three in the 10.30pm slot. It features Brodkin in character in a studio setting, but also features television sketches of his other characters. The show was commissioned for a second series, which aired on 25 August 2011.

== Reception ==
Brodkin has won several competitions and awards for his work, including Brighton's Komedia comedy competition and The Writers' Guild Award for Best Newcomer in Edinburgh for his show Everyone But Himself.

In reviewing his Nelson stand-up character in 2009, James Kettle of The Guardian stated that, in comparison to Matt Lucas's aggressive Vicky Pollard, and Catherine Tate's Lauren Cooper, Brodkin's portrayal has "a three-dimensional personality" and is a "gentler, more likeable soul, with a dopily comprehensive lack of self-awareness" and that, in playing the 'chav', "no one's done it quite like Simon Brodkin".

== Pranks ==
Many of Brodkin's pranks were featured in a TV programme Britain's Greatest Hoaxer which was shown on Channel 4 on 7 February 2017.

=== Football ===
On 16 March 2013, Brodkin, in character as Jason Bent, ran onto the pitch at Goodison Park and attempted to warm up with the Manchester City team ahead of their Premier League match with Everton. He was arrested and charged with pitch encroachment contrary to the Football (Offences) Act 1991. When the case came to court, the judge agreed to the charge being withdrawn and Brodkin was given a six-month conditional caution for the incident.

In 2014, dressed as Jason Bent in a smart suit, he briefly mixed in with the England World Cup squad at Luton Airport before being removed by police.

On 20 July 2015, Brodkin gatecrashed a press conference at the headquarters of the football governing body FIFA in Zürich, Switzerland amidst the organisation's corruption scandal. He walked onto the stage in character as Jason Bent and threw a wad of United States dollar bills worth $600 over the FIFA president Sepp Blatter, claiming that it was part of a bid to bring the 2026 FIFA World Cup to North Korea. Brodkin was promptly led out of the conference by security personnel, and Blatter temporarily postponed the news conference. Brodkin was arrested and charged with trespassing.

=== Television talent shows ===
On 8 November 2014, during Stereo Kicks' performance on The X Factor, Brodkin as Nelson invaded the stage pretending to perform alongside them. He was escorted away by the show's floor manager.

In January 2016, Brodkin auditioned on Britain's Got Talent, dressed as a rabbi, and pretended to be an awful rapper named Steven Goldblatt, as a way to prove his opinion that untalented acts do well on the show. He was selected for a Judge's Audition at the Dominion Theatre in London, where he performed a rap about Britain named "Red, White and Blue". Proving his point, even though Brodkin was deliberately not talented, the judges put him through.

=== Politics ===
On 24 June 2016, at the reopening of Donald Trump's Trump Turnberry golf resort, Brodkin hijacked Trump's speech with Nazi golf balls. The US presidential candidate was about to take to the podium at his Turnberry resort when Brodkin interrupted, dispersed the balls amongst the podium, and began giving out balls to the crowd.

On 4 October 2017, Brodkin interrupted Prime Minister Theresa May's speech to the Conservative Party conference, handing her a mocked-up P45 tax form (given in the UK when a person's employment comes to an end) and telling her "Boris asked me to give this to you", at a time when it was much speculated that Boris Johnson, then Foreign Secretary, might seek to replace May as Conservative Party leader (as he later did). He then went over to Johnson and gave him the 'thumbs up' gesture before he was removed from the venue. Brodkin had obtained the appropriate documents to attend the event, which led to calls to revise security measures.

=== Other ===
In November 2012, during a signing at HMV on Oxford Street in London, Brodkin performed a prank as Nelson in which he "stole" his own DVD and was chased by an actor dressed as a policeman. A real police community support officer believed it was an actual theft and attempted to restrain Brodkin.

At Glastonbury Festival 2015, Brodkin as Nelson interrupted a performance by Kanye West by running onto the stage and proceeding to join in with the performance. He was removed promptly by security. Brodkin said "[West had] interrupted Taylor Swift at an awards ceremony, saying Beyoncé should have won, so I thought it was legitimate", and that he was disappointed Kanye didn't enter into the spirit.

In March 2016, Brodkin invaded a speech by a Volkswagen representative at the Geneva Motor Show. He was seen dressed as a VW engineer attempting to add a "cheat box" to the car (a reference to the Volkswagen emissions scandal) whilst VW board member Jürgen Stackmann was making a speech. "No-one is going to find out about this one," Brodkin told the audience. He was subsequently removed by security before the speech continued.

On 6 September 2016, Brodkin "renamed" Philip Green's £100m super yacht Lionheart to BHS Destroyer, in reference to the recent collapse of the BHS department stores of which Green was previously the owner. Whilst the boat was moored in Monaco, Brodkin and a small crew hired a small dinghy and, unnoticed by the yacht's crew, sailed out to it. Unfurling a banner reading "BHS Destroyer", he attached it over the yacht's actual name. Brodkin later posted on Twitter: "Good of Sir Philip Green to rename his £100 million yacht to something more appropriate. I was glad to help."

== Personal life ==
In 2022, Brodkin was diagnosed with ADHD. In an interview with The Big Issue he said that he "...had no awareness of it despite going through medical school being a junior doctor – and always being interested in mental health – shines a real light on the lack of education in the medical community."

Brodkin is a supporter of Manchester City. His father and grandparents were originally from Manchester which led him to growing up supporting the club.

== Stand-up DVDs ==
- Lee Nelson Live (19 November 2012)
