= Iliza Shlesinger: Freezing Hot =

- Written by: Iliza Shlesinger
- Starring: Iliza Shlesinger
- Country of origin: United States
- Original language: English

Production
- Running time: 71 minutes

Original release
- Network: Netflix
- Release: January 23, 2015

Iliza Shlesinger: Freezing Hot is a 2015 American stand-up comedy film written by and starring Iliza Shlesinger, Iliza Shlesinger's second stand-up comedy special for Netflix, following War Paint from 2013. In Freezing Hot, filmed in Denver, Iliza talks about how men and women are different, silk blouses, pumpkin spice lattes, Pinterest and more.

== Cast ==
- Iliza Shlesinger

== Release ==
It was released on January 23, 2015 on Netflix.
