= Iliza Shlesinger: War Paint =

2013 film by Jay Chapman

- Film poster
- Written by: Iliza Shlesinger
- Directed by: Jay Chapman
- Starring: Iliza Shlesinger
- Country of origin: United States
- Original language: English

Production
- Running time: 75 minutes

Original release
- Network: Netflix
- Release: September 1, 2013

Iliza Shlesinger: War Paint is a 2013 American stand-up comedy film directed by Jay Chapman and written by and starring Iliza Shlesinger, Shlesinger's first stand-up comedy special for Netflix. In War Paint, filmed at the Lakewood Theater in Dallas, TX, Shlesinger talks about dating, friendship, make-up, pretending to like hiking and more.

== Cast ==
- Iliza Shlesinger

== Release ==
It was released on September 1, 2013, on Netflix.
