= Gerry Duggan (writer) =

American comics writer (born 1973)

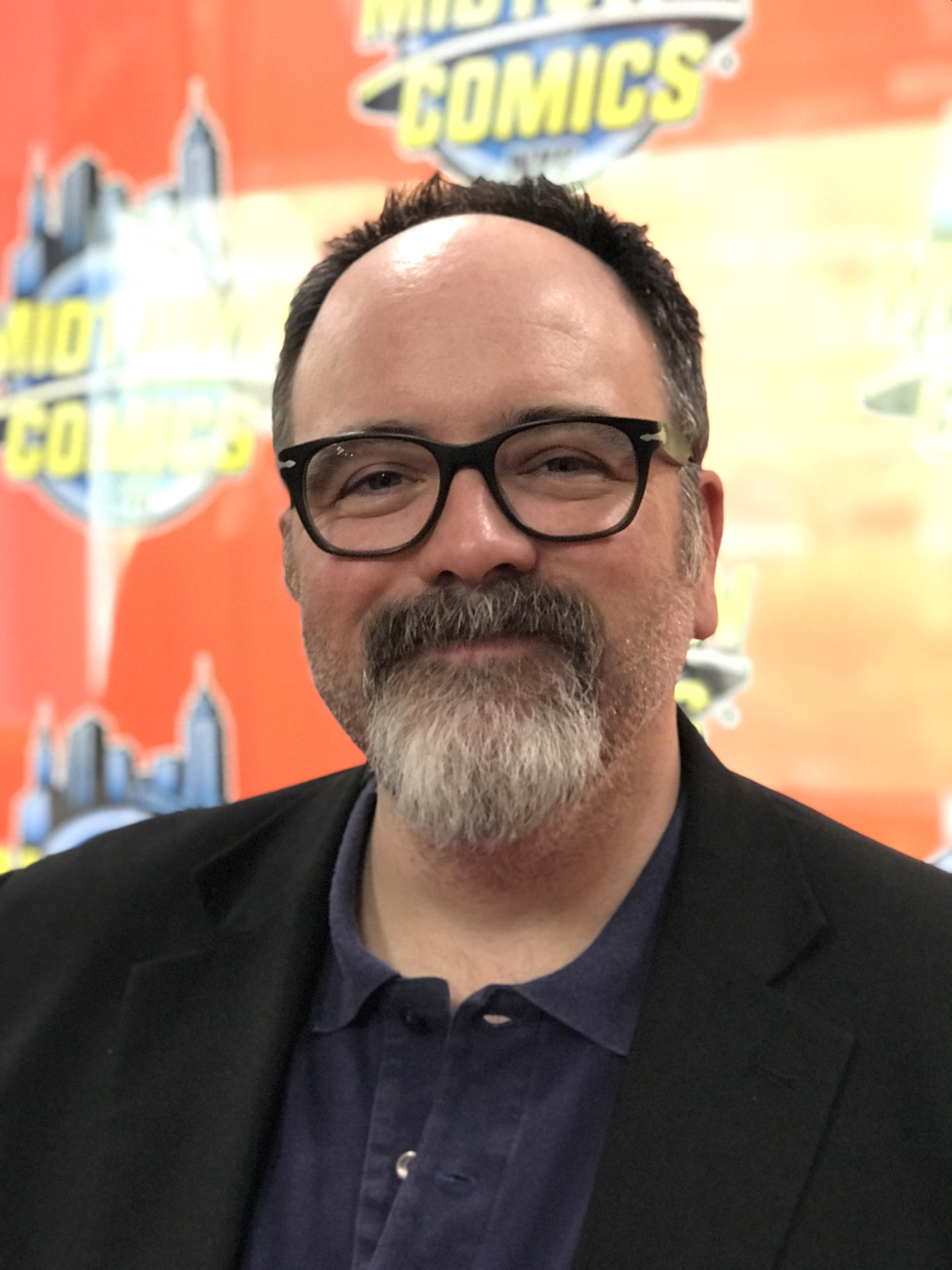
- Duggan at a signing for Deadpool #300 at Midtown Comics in Manhattan in 2018
- Born: 1973 (age 52–53); New York City, U.S.
- Education: Emerson College
- Occupations: Director and writer of television and comics
- Years active: 1999–present
- Spouse: Virginia Duggan
- Children: 1
- Website: gerryduggan.com

Gerry Duggan (/ˈdʌɡən/; born 1973) is an American comics writer, director and photographer living in Los Angeles.

== Early life ==
Gerry Duggan was born in New York City and raised in Ridgewood, New Jersey, where he graduated from Ridgewood High School in 1992. He attended Emerson College, graduating in 1996.

== Career ==
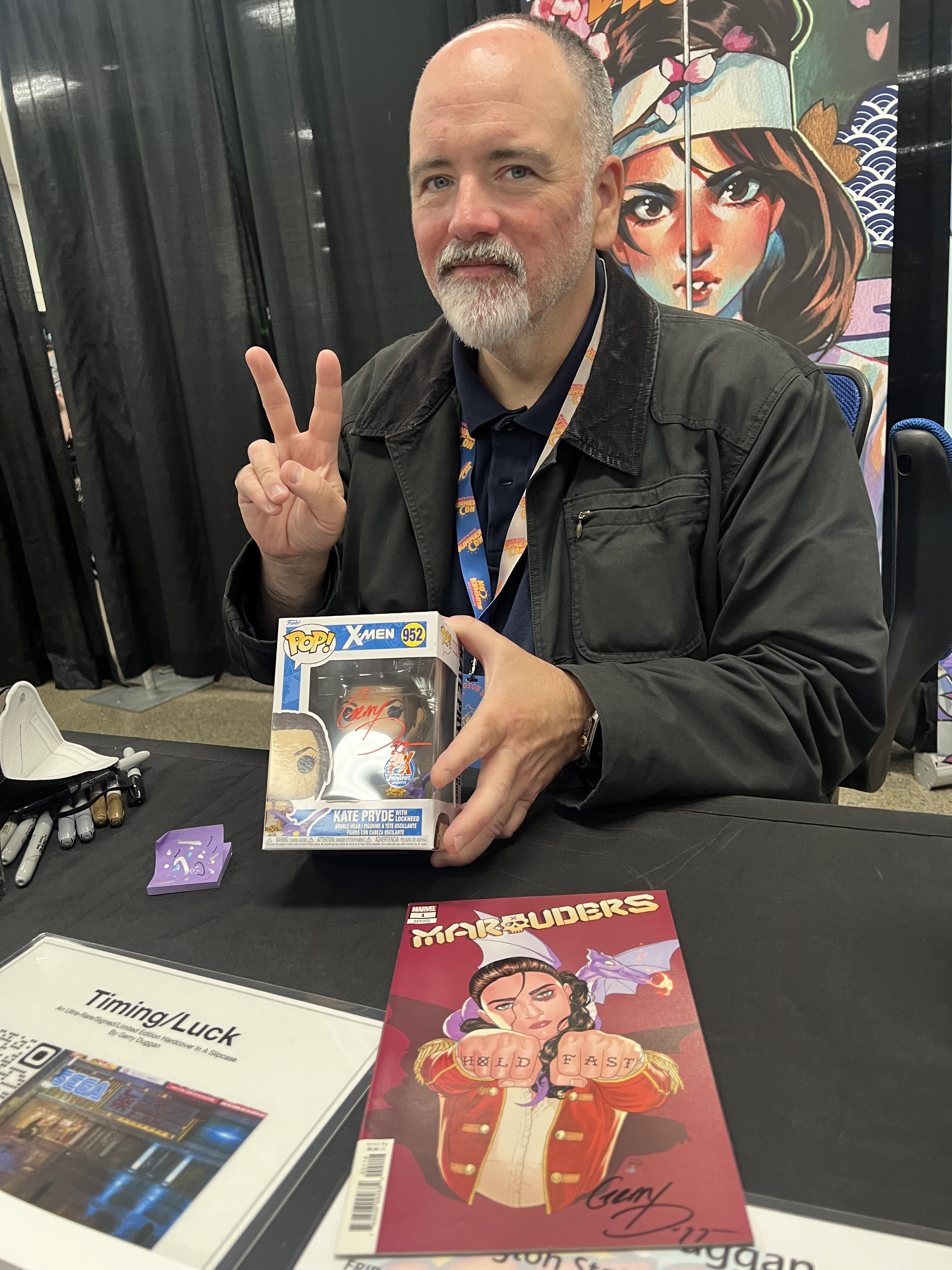
Gerry Duggan at Washington SummerCon on June 21, 2025

Duggan was working at Golden Apple Comics in 1999 where he met many of his future collaborators, and eventually began production jobs working at Dakota Films. For the next 10 years worked in live TV, awards shows, pilots, comics, and films before finding traction in American comic books. Gerry Duggan has written Hulk, Nova, Hawkeye Vs. Deadpool, Batman: Arkham Manor, and co-writing Deadpool with Brian Posehn.

Duggan was a writer and producer on Attack of the Show! and was on the staff for its final shows. His comics career began at Image Comics by writing and co-creating series The Last Christmas with Posehn and Rick Remender, and later The Infinite Horizon with Phil Noto, with was nominated for an Eisner Award in 2008 for Best New Series. Duggan was a regular cast member on Posehn's role-playing podcast Nerd Poker, but was forced to exit due to increased writing deadlines.

In 2013, Marvel re-launched the Deadpool series, with Duggan and Brian Posehn as writers. In 2014 Duggan contributed to the script for the Xbox game Sunset Overdrive, and was part of a team that wrote the 2014 Film Independent Spirit Awards hosted by Patton Oswalt, for which he was nominated for a WGA Award. Duggan also directed the promotional ads for that year's awards shows. In the same year he commenced a contract with Marvel Entertainment, and began work on a reboot of the Avengers series.

In 2016 Duggan co-wrote Marvel's Doctor Strange: The Last Days of Magic, and continued to write for the Deadpool series until the run's conclusion with issue 36. Duggan currently writes the critically acclaimed Marauders, as part of Marvel's 2019 reboot of the X-Men titles and also began writing Cable in 2020. In 2021, Duggan began writing the X-Men flagship series, replacing Jonathan Hickman.

== Personal life ==
Duggan has lived and worked in Los Angeles since 1998. He is divorced and has one son.

== Bibliography ==
=== DC Comics ===
- Batman vol. 2 #34, "The Meek" (with Scott Snyder and Matteo Scalera, August 2014) collected in Volume 6: Graveyard Shift (hc, 224 pages, 2015, ISBN 1-4012-5230-3)
- Arkham Manor (6-issue limited series, October 2014-March 2015)
  - Arkham Manor (tpb, 144 pages, 2015, ISBN 1-4012-5458-6) collects:
    - "A Home for the Criminally Insane" (with Shawn Crystal, in #1-6, 2014–2015)

=== Marvel Comics ===
- Deadpool vol. 3 #1-44, 250 (November 2012-March 2015)
  - Volume 1: Dead Presidents (tpb, 136 pages, 2013, ISBN 0-7851-6680-7) collects:
    - "In Wade We Trust" (with Brian Posehn and Tony Moore, in #1, 2012)
    - "We Fought A Zoo" (with Brian Posehn and Tony Moore, in #2, 2012)
    - "Dr. Strange Lives (Or, How I Learned Deadpool Was Da Bomb)" (with Brian Posehn and Tony Moore, in #3, 2012)
    - "The Quick and the Dead and the Really Dead" (with Brian Posehn and Tony Moore, in #4, 2013)
    - "Star Wars: Revenge of the Gripper" (with Brian Posehn and Tony Moore, in #5, 2013)
    - "National Maul" (with Brian Posehn and Tony Moore, in #6, 2013)
  - Volume 2: Soul Hunter (tpb, 136 pages, 2013, ISBN 0-7851-6681-5) collects:
    - "Drinking Game" (with Brian Posehn and Scott Koblish, in #7, 2013)
    - "Running with the Devil" (with Brian Posehn and Mike Hawthorne, in #8, 2013)
    - "The Devil & The Deep Blue Sea" (with Brian Posehn and Mike Hawthorne, in #9, 2013)
    - "Eight Legs to Kick You" (with Brian Posehn and Mike Hawthorne, in #10, 2013)
    - "Dare to be Deviled" (with Brian Posehn and Mike Hawthorne, in #11, 2013)
    - "Damned if You Win, Damned if You Lose" (with Brian Posehn and Mike Hawthorne, in #12, 2013)
  - Volume 3: The Good, the Bad and the Ugly (tpb, 160 pages, 2014, ISBN 0-7851-6682-3) collects:
    - "Untitled" (with Brian Posehn and Scott Koblish, in #13, 2013)
    - "The White Man Cometh!" (with Brian Posehn and Scott Koblish, in #14, 2013)
    - "The Good, the Bad, and the Ugly" (with Brian Posehn and Declan Shalvey, in #15-19, 2013)
  - Volume 4: Deadpool vs. S.H.I.E.L.D. (tpb, 136 pages, 2014, ISBN 0-7851-8932-7) collects:
    - "WAKANDAN VACATION!!!" (with Brian Posehn and Scott Koblish, in #20, 2013)
    - "Deadpool vs. S.H.I.E.L.D." (with Brian Posehn and Mike Hawthorne, in #21-25, 2013–2014)
  - Volume 5: Wedding of Deadpool (tpb, 168 pages, 2014, ISBN 0-7851-8933-5) collects:
    - "Death Comes To Tinseltown (Or The Last Hitler)" (with Brian Posehn and Scott Koblish, in #26, 2014)
    - "The Wedding of Deadpool" (with Brian Posehn and Mike Hawthorne, in #27, 2014)
    - "Operation Ballerina Drop" (with Scott Koblish, in #27, 2014)
    - "Honeymoon in Tokyo" (with Brian Posehn and Scott Koblish, in #28, 2014)
  - Volume 6: Original Sin (tpb, 144 pages, 2014, ISBN 0-7851-8934-3) collects:
    - "The Honeymoon Is Over" (with Brian Posehn and John Lucas, in #29, 2014)
    - "The Brave and the Blonde" (with Brian Posehn and John Lucas, in #30, 2014)
    - "My Robot Buddy" (with Brian Posehn and John Lucas, in #31, 2014)
    - "Daddy/Daughter Day" (with Brian Posehn and John Lucas, in #32, 2014)
    - "Out the Window" (with Brian Posehn and John Lucas, in #33, 2014)
    - "The One With the Super Rare 3-D Cover!" (with Brian Posehn and Scott Koblish, in #34, 2014)
  - Volume 7: Axis (tpb, 136 pages, 2015, ISBN 0-7851-9243-3) collects:
    - "When Cometh the Deadpool-Spider-Slayer" (with Brian Posehn and Mike Hawthorne, in #35, 2014)
    - "On His Axis" (with Brian Posehn and Mike Hawthorne, in #36, 2014)
    - "Guess Who's Bumming At Dinner?" (with Brian Posehn and Mike Hawthorne, in #37, 2014)
    - "A Friend in Need..." (with Brian Posehn and Mike Hawthorne, in #38, 2014)
    - "A Friend Indeed..." (with Brian Posehn, Mike Hawthorne and Mirko Colak, in #39, 2014)
    - "The Magic of Gracking" (with Brian Posehn and Scott Koblish, in #40, 2015)
  - Volume 8: All Good Things (tpb, 176 pages, 2015, ISBN 0-7851-9244-1) collects:
    - "Wade's No Good, Horrible, Very Bad Day" (with Brian Posehn and Salvador Espin, in #41, 2015)
    - "Sand and Deliver" (with Brian Posehn and Salvador Espin, in #42, 2015)
    - "After Mash" (with Brian Posehn and Salvador Espin, in #43, 2015)
    - "Soul Coffin" (with Brian Posehn and Salvador Espin, in #44, 2015)
    - "The Aristocrats" (with Brian Posehn and Mike Hawthorne, in #250, 2015)
    - "Deadpool Roasts the Marvel Universe" (with Brian Posehn and Scott Koblish, in #250, 2015)
- Uncanny Avengers vol. 1 #8AU, "Age of Ultron" (with Rick Remender and Adam Kubert, May 2013) collected in Age of Ultron Companion (tpb, 200 pages, 2014, ISBN 0-7851-8485-6)
- A+X #8, 13-18 (May 2013-March 2014)
  - Volume 2: A+X=Amazing (tpb, 136 pages, 2013, ISBN 0-7851-6675-0) collects:
    - "Spider-Woman + Kitty Pryde" (with Salvador Larroca, in #8, 2013)
  - Volume 3: A+X=Outstanding (tpb, 136 pages, 2014, ISBN 0-7851-9011-2) collects:
    - "Captain America + Cyclops" (with David Yardin and Matteo Lolli, in #13-18, 2013–2014)
- Nova vol. 5 #11-31 (November 2013-May 2015)
  - Volume 3: Nova Corpse (tpb, 152 pages, 2014, ISBN 0-7851-8957-2) collects:
    - "Nova #1000" (with Y. Stewart, in #10, 2013)
    - "Chapter XI: Pawn Takes Night" (with Paco Medina and Carlo Barberi, in #11, 2013)
    - "Chapter XII: Help Wanted" (with Paco Medina and Ed McGuinness, in #12, 2014)
    - "Chapter XIII: The Punch-Out at the Carefree Corral" (with Paco Medina, in #13, 2014)
    - "Chapter XIV: Road to Knowhere" (with David Baldeon, in #14, 2014)
    - "Chapter XV: Can we keep him?" (with David Baldeon, in #15, 2014)
    - "Chapter XVI: Battle Skaarns" (with David Baldeon, in #16, 2014)
  - Volume 4: Original Sin (tpb, 136 pages, 2015, ISBN 0-7851-8958-0) collects:
    - "Chapter XVII: Home Alone" (with Paco Medina, in #17, 2014)
    - "Chapter XVIII: El Día de los Muertos" (with David Baldeon, in #18, 2014)
    - "Chapter XIX: Original Sin Part II" (with David Baldeon, in #19, 2014)
    - "Chapter XX: The Truth About the Black Hats" (with David Baldeon, in #20, 2014)
    - "Chapter XXI: Moving Day" (with David Baldeon, in #21, 2014)
    - "Chapter XXII: Children of the Candy Corn" (with Federico Santagati and John Timms, in #22, 2014)
  - Volume 5: AXIS (tpb, 120 pages, 2015, ISBN 0-7851-9241-7) collects:
    - "Chapter XXIII: Wouldn't Mama Be Proud" (with David Baldeon, in #23, 2014)
    - "Chapter XXIV: Stupidity Tries" (with David Baldeon, in #24, 2014)
    - "Chapter XXV: The Super-Saver Club Card" (with David Baldeon, in #25, 2014)
    - "Chapter XXVI: Look What The Bus Dragged In" (with John Timms, in #26, 2015)
    - "Chapter XXVII: Mr.Carnage Goes To Carefree" (with John Timms, in #27, 2015)
  - Volume 6: Homecoming (tpb, 128 pages, 2015, ISBN 0-7851-9375-8) collects:
    - "The Adventures of Doc & Sammy" (with David Baldeon, in Annual vol. 2 #1, 2015)
    - "Chapter XXVIII: The Black Vortex" (with David Baldeon, in #28, 2015)
    - "Chapter XXIX: A Sort Of Homecoming - Part I" (with David Baldeon, in #29, 2015)
    - "Chapter XXX: A Sort of Homecoming - Part 2" (with David Baldeon, in #30, 2015)
    - "Chapter XXXI: A Sort of Homecoming, Finale" (with David Baldeon, in #31, 2015)
- Deadpool: The Gauntlet #1-13 (January 2014-April 2014)
  - Deadpool: Dracula's Gauntlet (tpb, 200 pages, 2016, ISBN 1-302-90121-4) collects:
    - "Chapter 1: From America with Love... and No Backsies!" (with Brian Posehn and Reilly Brown, in #1, 2014)
    - "Chapter 2: Deadpool & The Temple Of Boom!" (with Brian Posehn and Reilly Brown, in #2, 2014)
    - "Chapter 3: You Had One Job, Deadpool" (with Brian Posehn and Reilly Brown, in #3, 2014)
    - "Chapter 4: Rail Grind" (with Brian Posehn and Reilly Brown, in #4, 2014)
    - "Chapter 5: Blade Makes Three" (with Brian Posehn and Reilly Brown, in #5, 2014)
    - "Chapter 6: An American Mercenary in Paris" (with Brian Posehn and Reilly Brown, in #6, 2014)
    - "Chapter 7: Ready? A.I.M. FIRE!" (with Brian Posehn and Reilly Brown, in #7, 2014)
    - "Chapter 8: Werewolf of London-Adjacent" (with Brian Posehn and Reilly Brown, in #8, 2014)
    - "Chapter 9: Gangs of New York" (with Brian Posehn and Khary Randolph, in #9, 2014)
    - "Chapter 10: When Cometh the Frightful Four" (with Brian Posehn and Reilly Brown, in #10, 2014)
    - "Chapter 11: Domestic Dispute" (with Brian Posehn, Reilly Brown and Scott Koblish, in #11, 2014)
    - "Chapter 12: Deadpool, Disarmed" (with Brian Posehn, Reilly Brown and Scott Koblish, in #12, 2014)
    - "Chapter 13: Give Love a Hand" (with Brian Posehn and Reilly Brown, in #13, 2014)
- Hulk vol. 3 #5-16 (August 2014-May 2015)
  - Volume 2: Omega Hulk Book 1 (tpb, 168 pages, 2015, ISBN 0-7851-9068-6) collects:
    - "The O Hulk" (with Mark Bagley, in #5-10, 2014–2015)
  - Volume 3: Omega Hulk Book 2 (tpb, 152 pages, 2015, ISBN 0-7851-9226-3) collects:
    - "The O Hulk" (with Mark Bagley, in #11-16, 2015)
- Uncanny Avengers vol. 2 #3-4, "Counter-Evolutionary" (with Rick Remender and Daniel Acuña, April–May 2015) collected in Volume 1: Counter-Evolutionary (tpb, 112 pages, 2015, ISBN 0-7851-9237-9)
- Hawkeye Vs. Deadpool #0-4 (with Mateo Lolli, September 2014-January 2015) collected in Hawkeye Vs. Deadpool (tpb, 120 pages, 2015, ISBN 0-7851-9310-3)
- Death of Wolverine: Deadpool & Captain America #1 (with Scott Kolins, October 2014) collected in Death of Wolverine: The Complete Collection (tpb, 496 pages, 2018, ISBN 1-302-91242-9)
- Uncanny Avengers vol. 3, #1-23 (October 2015-May 2017)
  - Volume 1: Lost Future (tpb, 152 pages, 2016, ISBN 0-7851-9615-3) collects:
    - "An Imperfect Union" (with Ryan Stegman, in #1, 2015)
    - "No Man Can Outrun Death" (with Ryan Stegman, in #2, 2015)
    - "Too Many Cooks" (with Ryan Stegman, in #3, 2015)
    - "Always Shoot a Swordsman" (with Ryan Stegman, in #4, 2016)
    - "The Bagalia Job" (with Carlos Pacheco, in #5, 2016)
    - "The Uninvited" (with Carlos Pacheco, in #6, 2016)
  - Volume 2: The Man Who Fell to Earth (tpb, 136 pages, 2016, ISBN 0-7851-9616-1) collects:
    - "The Hills are Alive... with the Sound of Gunfire" (with Ryan Stegman, in #7, 2016)
    - "Student Debt" (with Ryan Stegman, in #8, 2016)
    - "The Man Who Fell To Earth" (with Pepe Larraz, in #9, 2016)
    - "Who Are You Wearing? (with Pepe Larraz, in #10, 2016)
    - "AC/DC" (with Pepe Larraz, in #11, 2016)
    - "Rage Against the Machine" (with Pepe Larraz, in #12, 2016)
  - Volume 3: Civil War II (tpb, 112 pages, 2017, ISBN 1-302-90234-2) collecs:
    - "Don't Do The Crime" (with Ryan Stegman, in #13, 2016)
    - "A Failed Experiment" (with Ryan Stegman, in #14, 2016)
    - "The Rebound" (with Pepe Larraz, in #15, 2016)
    - "Gamma Gamma Hey!" (with Pepe Larraz, in #16, 2016)
    - "No Rest For The Weary" (with Pepe Larraz, in #17, 2016)
  - Volume 4: Red Skull (tpb, 136 pages, 2017, ISBN 1-302-90644-5) collects:
    - "Never Gonna Give You Up" (with Kevin Libranda, in #18, 2016)
    - "Lights Out" (with Pepe Larraz and Rodrigo Zayas, in #19, 2017)
    - "As The World Burns" (with Pepe Larraz, in #20, 2017)
    - "Maximum Effort" (with Kevin Libranda, in #21, 2017)
    - "Rogue Won" (with Pepe Larraz, in #22, 2017)
    - "Coda" (with Pepe Larraz, in #23, 2017)
- Avengers: No More Bullying #1, "Friends on the Web" (with Marcio Takara, January 2015)
- Infinity Gauntlet vol. 2 (5-issue limited series with Dustin Weaver, May–November 2015, collected in Infinity Gauntlet: Warzones (tpb, 112 pages, 2015, ISBN 0-7851-9874-1)
- Mrs. Deadpool and the Howling Commandos (4-issue limited series with Salvador Espin, June–September 2015, collected in Mrs. Deadpool and the Howling Commandos (tpb, 112 pages, 2016, ISBN 0-7851-9880-6)
- 1872 (4-issue limited series with Nik Virella, July–October 2015, collected in 1872: Warzones (tpb, 120 pages, 2015, ISBN 0-7851-9877-6)
- Chewbacca (5-issue limited series with Phil Noto, October–December 2015, collected in Star Wars: Chewbacca, tpb, 112 pages, 2016, ISBN 0-7851-9320-0)
- Deadpool vol. 4 #1-36 (November 2015-September 2017)
  - Volume 1: Millionaire With A Mouth (tpb, 120 pages, 2016, ISBN 0-7851-9617-X) collects:
    - "Sumus Omnes Deadpool" (with Mike Hawthorne, in #1, 2015)
    - "The More We Give, The More We Have" (with Mike Hawthorne, in #2, 2015)
    - "Just Because You're Paranoid..." (with Mike Hawthorne, in #3, 2015)
    - "It Had To Be You" (with Mike Hawthorne, in #4, 2015)
    - "Hunt the Dork Knight" (with Mike Hawthorne, in #5, 2016)
  - Volume 2: End of an Error (tpb, 136 pages, 2016, ISBN 0-7851-9618-8) collects:
    - "Español Para Deadpool" (with Scott Koblish, in #3.1, 2015)
    - ""Deadpool 2099 - Chapter 1" (with Scott Koblish, in #6, 2016)
    - "The End of an Error" (with Scott Koblish, in #7, 2016)
    - "Solo's Solo Mission" (with Phil Noto, in #7, 2016)
  - Volume 3: Deadpool Vs. Sabretooth (tpb, 112 pages, 2016, ISBN 0-7851-9619-6) collects:
    - "Nightmare on Memory Lane" (with Mateo Lolli, in #8, 2016)
    - "To Me, My Ex-Man" (with Mateo Lolli, in #9, 2016)
    - "Bloody Meet" (with Mateo Lolli and Iban Coello, in #10, 2016)
    - "Fahrenheit .357" (with Mateo Lolli, in #11, 2016)
    - "Deadpool 2099 - Chapter 2: ...It's a Dead City" (with Scott Koblish, in #12, 2016)
  - Volume 4: Temporary Insanitation (tpb, 112 pages, 2016, ISBN 1-302-90091-9) collects:
    - "Untitled" (with Scott Koblish, in Deadpool: Last Days of Magic #1, 2016)
    - "Temporary Insanitation Part 1" (with Jacopo Camagni, in #13, 2016)
    - "Temporary Insanitation Part 4" (with Paco Diaz, in #13, 2016)
  - Volume 5: Civil War II (tpb, 136 pages, 2017, ISBN 1-302-90148-6) collects:
    - "Civil War II" (with Mike Hawthorne and Brian Level, in 14–18, 2016)
    - "Deadpool 2099 - Chapter 3" (with Scott Koblish, in #19, 2016)
  - Volume 6: Patience: Zero (tpb, 152 pages, 2017, ISBN 1-302-90243-1) collects:
    - "The Never-Ending Struggle" (with Mateo Lolli, in #20, 2016)
    - "Match du Grudge" (with Mateo Lolli, in #21, 2016)
    - "Patience: Zero" (with Mateo Lolli, in #22, 2016)
    - "Do The Truffle Shuffle" (with Mateo Lolli and Paolo Villanelli, in #23, 2016)
    - "Deferred Payment Plan" (with Mateo Lolli, in #24, 2017)
    - "Go Ask The Skrulls, Child" (with Scott Koblish, in #25, 2017)
  - Volume 7: Deadpool Does Shakespeare (tpb, 112 pages, 2017, ISBN 1-302-90542-2) collectS:
    - "Heart-Shaped Box" (with Scott Hepburn, in #26, 2017)
    - "And Now For Something Completely Different" (with Salvador Espin and Sean Izaakse, in #27, 2017)
  - Volume 8: Til Death Do Us (tpb, 136 pages, 2017, ISBN 1-302-90543-0) collects:
    - "Til Death Do Us..." (with Salvador Espin, in #28-29, 2017)
  - Volume 9: Deadpool in Space (tpb, 112 pages, 2017, ISBN 1-302-90760-3) collectS:
    - "A Space Oddity" (with Mike Hawthorne, in #30, 2017)
  - Volume 10: Secret Empire (tpb, 136 pages, 2017, ISBN 1-302-90761-1) collects:
    - "Meifumado" (with Mateo Lolli, in #31, 2017)
    - "Situation: Normalization" (with Mateo Lolli, in #32, 2017)
    - "Airbag" (with Mateo Lolli and Mike Hawthorne, in #33, 2017)
    - "Keep Stirring the Sauce" (with Mateo Lolli and Mike Hawthorne, in #34, 2017)
    - "Karma Police" (with Mike Hawthorne, in #35, 2017)
  - "Si, Change" (with Mateo Lolli, in #36, 2017)
- Guardians of Infinity #4, "Takeout From Tuliebitz's" (with Leonardo Romero, March 2016) collected in Guardians of the Galaxy: Tales of the Cosmos (tpb, 136 pages, 2016, ISBN 0-7851-9588-2)
- Doctor Strange: Last Days of Magic #1, "Doctor Voodoo" (with Danilo Beyruth, April 2016)
- Spider-Man/Deadpool #7, "Convention Chaos or When Cometh the Plutocracy!" (with Scott Koblish, July 2016) collected in Volume 2: Side Pieces (tpb, 120 pages, 2017, ISBN 0-7851-9992-6)
- Solo vol. 2 (5-issue limited series with Geoffrey Thorne and Paco Diaz, November 2016-February 2017, collected in Solo: The One-Man War on Terror, tpb, 112 pages, 2017, ISBN 1-302-90480-9)
- All-New Guardians of the Galaxy #1-12 (May 2017-October 2017)
  - Volume 1: Communication Breakdown (tpb, 144 pages, 2017, ISBN 1-302-90544-9) collects:
    - "Smash & Grab" (with Aaron Kuder, in Free Comic Book Day 2017, 2017)
    - "Smash & Grab" (with Aaron Kuder, in #1, 2017)
    - "Been Caught Stealing" (with Aaron Kuder, in #2, 2017)
    - "The Trees" (with Aaron Kuder, in #4, 2017)
    - "Beyond Electric Dreams" (with Aaron Kuder, in #6, 2017)
    - "Robbin' & Stealin'" (with Marcus To, in #8, 2017)
    - "The Lamb Lies Down on Broadway" (with Aaron Kuder, in #10, 2017)
  - Volume 2: Riders in the Sky (tpb, 136 pages, 2017, ISBN 1-302-90545-7) collects:
    - "Includere" (with Frazer Irving, in #3, 2017)
    - "Across the Universe" (with Chriss Samnee, in #5, 2017)
    - "The Horns of Doom" (with Greg Smallwood, in #7, 2017)
    - "Shattered" (with Mike Hawthorne, in #9, 2017)
    - "Highway Patrolman" (with Roland Boschi, in #11, 2017)
    - "We Said Hello, Goodbye" (with Rod Reis, in #12, 2017)
- Despicable Deadpool #287-300 (with Scott Koblish, October 2017-July 2018)
- Guardians of the Galaxy vol. 1 #146-150 (with Aaron Kuder, November 2017-January 2018)
- Savage Avengers vol. 1 #1-.... (May 2019-.....)
- Marauders vol. 1 #1-.... (with Matteo Lolli, October 2019-.....)
- Cable vol. 4 #1-.... (with Phil Noto, March 2020-.....)
- Wolverine: Infinity Watch #1-5, (2019)
- X-Men: Vol. 6 (2021)

=== Other ===
- The Last Christmas (5-issue limited series, with Brian Posehn and Rick Remender, May–October 2006, collected in The Last Christmas, tpb, 176 pages, 2006, ISBN 1-58240-676-6, Image Comics)
- The Infinite Horizon (6-issue limited series, with Phil Noto, December 2007-November 2011, collected in The Infinite Horizon, tpb, 184 pages, 2012, ISBN 1-58240-972-2, Image Comics)
- Fear Agent #26 (Dark Horse Comics)
- The Simpsons #179 (Bongo Comics)
- The Simpsons Treehouse Of Horror #13, 18 (Bongo Comics)
- Dead Rabbit #1, #2, Image Comics)
- Dead Eyes (Image Comics)
- Secret History of the War on Weed

Preceded by Daniel Way	Deadpool writer 2012−2018 (2012−2015 with Brian Posehn)	Succeeded by Skottie Young
Preceded by Zeb Wells	Nova writer 2013−2015	Succeeded by Sean Ryan
Preceded by Mark Waid	Hulk writer 2014−2015	Succeeded by Greg Pak
Preceded by Rick Remender	Uncanny Avengers writer 2015−2017	Succeeded by Jim Zub
Preceded by Brian Michael Bendis	Guardians of the Galaxy writer 2017−2018	Succeeded by Donny Cates
