= The X-Fools =

1997 video game

- Macintosh cover art
- Developer: Parroty Interactive
- Publisher: Palladium Interactive
- Director: Steven Horowitz
- Producer: Stacey Rubin
- Programmer: WayForward
- Writers: Tony Camin; Ian Deitchman; J. P. Manoux; Kristin Rusk; Brian Posehn; Patton Oswalt
- Composer: Chronic Music
- Platforms: Windows, Macintosh
- Release: October 1, 1997
- Genre: Action
- Mode: Single-player

The X-Fools: The Spoof Is Out There is an interactive comedic 1997 video game developed by Parroty Interactive. It is a parody of supernatural television series The X-Files, which ran from 1993 to 2018. Released on the Mac and PC, it was the company's third game after Myst parody Pyst, and Star Warped which lampooned Star Wars, and would be followed by Microshaft Winblows 98, a parody of Microsoft Windows 98. The game was distributed throughout North America by Mindscape.

== Plot and gameplay ==
The game centres around two ex-FBI agents and skeptics named Mully and Scudder (parodies of X-Files protagonists Scully and Mulder) who encourage the player to undergo training as a new recruit. As such, the player is "subjected to a deprogramming regimen" according to Business Wire, which consists of a series of games, quizzes, and skits. The gameplay experience is essentially a series of minigames thematically linked to the television show The X-Files. For instance, Conspiracy Computer sees the protagonists analyse popular conspiracies, and Run, Agent, Run! sees the player evade aliens and villains from The X-Files. Kill Screen described the style of the game as "distractionware" and an "interactive MAD Magazine".

== Development ==
Palladium's vice president of marketing, Rob Halligan, explained that the success of Pyst paved the way for The X-Fools, and noted that the game was being released at a time rife with interest in the supernatural: the news was buzzing with the 50th anniversary of the Roswell incident, the Mars Pathfinder mission, and the impending premiere of the fifth season of The X-Files. Artist Tom Richmond, who had an ongoing professional relationship with Parroty Interactive, provided some of the game's illustrations. Michael Donovan did voice work for the game.

== Release and promotion ==
The game's official website went live in September 1997, and allowed players to access additional content, while providing a free demo for those yet to purchase the title. The website held a "Conspiracy Quest Contest" from October 31, 1997 to July 17, 1998 where players solved riddles relating to the concurrently airing fifth season of The X-Files, with prizes (a digital camera, 2,000 acre real estate plot on Mars, and a Palladium Gift Pack) being awarded to multiple winners. It also allowed players to send "X-cards", and offered players the opportunity send in X-Files questions for the developers to include in the title's trivia minigame entitled Trust No One. Game modules from The X-Fools were added as bonus features on the Special Edition of Pyst in October 1997. The X-Fools uses Shockwave as its game engine.

The game received mixed reviews from critics upon release; positive reviews from MacHome's Tamara Stafford and Roy Bassave of The Seattle Times suggested fans of the original series would enjoy The X-Fools. Detractors included PC Gamer's Richard Cobbett, who negatively compared the game to Parroty's previous title Microshaft Winblows 98 (1998); and Wojciech Kotas of The Mac Gamer's Ledge, which found The X-Files' self-referential humor better than the "lukewarm", limited, and uninspired parody of the game. In 2011, The Sydney Morning Herald ranked the game 79th on its Re-Play: 100 worst games ever list, writing that it "couldn't be unfunnier".
