= Microshaft Winblows 98 =

1998 parody video game

- Developer: Parroty Interactive
- Publisher: Palladium Interactive
- Director: Steven Horowitz
- Producer: Dale Geist
- Programmer: WayForward
- Writers: Tony Camin; Ian Deitchman; J. P. Manoux; Kristin Rusk; Brian Posehn
- Composer: Chronic Music
- Platforms: Windows, Macintosh
- Release: January 5, 1998
- Mode: Single-player

Microshaft Winblows 98 is a 1998 interactive comedy video game for Windows and Classic Mac OS. It parodies the then-upcoming Windows 98 operating system, as well as Microsoft co-founder Bill Gates. Released by Palladium Interactive during the United States v. Microsoft Corp. case and at a time when Microsoft, Windows, and Gates were easy targets for jokes, the game attempted to offer a satirical take on the subject matter.

Developed by Parroty Interactive, the self-professed National Lampoon of the interactive media industry, Microshaft Winblows 98 became the company's fourth interactive comedy video game, after Pyst, a clone of adventure video game Myst, Star Warped, a satire of science-fiction film series Star Wars, and The X-Fools, a spoof of supernatural TV series The X-Files, respectively. Initially released on January 5, 1998, before gaining further exposure through being present at Macworld Expo, Microshaft Winblows 98 was praised by magazines and newspapers, mostly for its clever and blunt humor.

== Concept and gameplay ==
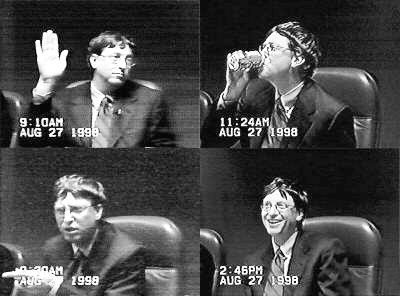
Bill Gates while in a district court for United States v. Microsoft Corp, which focused on controversial business practices by him and Microsoft that Microshaft Winblows 98 pokes at.

Despite Microsoft being the target of jokes for a considerable period of its then 23-year history, Microshaft Winblows 98 was released at a specific point in time when Microsoft and Bill Gates were in the news for controversial reasons. In particular, Gates was in legal trouble with the Justice Department in terms of the court case United States v. Microsoft Corp surrounding the company's alleged unfair leveraging of its market dominance. The Buffalo News noted that Gates had been embroiled in issues with "competitors, the feds and industry pundits". Microshaft Winblows 98 came into existence as a response to this and a way to "mock [Gates'] entire existence" in a humorous and intelligent way, serving as a parody of the "company, the software and the man". Palladium officials noted that the game was influenced by the "public's fascination with this cultural phenomenon", although they claimed the timing of the game was "dumb luck".

Ed Bernstein, founder and CEO of Palladium Interactive had long-wanted to create works which emulated the parody located in Mad magazine, and felt this game could be his "piece de resistance", further commenting that his company would have been able to "sell the empty boxes" due to the game cover humor alone. Elizabeth Wasserman of Knight Ridder/Tribune Business News cited various examples of this including the tagline "Who does he want to own today?", a parody of Microsoft's own "Where do you want to go today?", and the version, listed as "98 or 99 or 00 or 01".

Describing itself as "rated for teenagers" due to its "comic mischief" and "suggestive themes", the game opens with the fictitious Microsoft janitor Graham and Bill Gates' personal assistant Meg (played by J. P. Manoux and Tamara Bick respectively) with a dialogue on the program. When started, the game presents a bootsplash much like the one on the Windows 9x operating systems before presenting the user with a desktop from which various "applications" can be launched; these include spoofs of computer games (such as Doom), Microsoft software (such as Internet Explorer), and even sometimes popular fads of the time (such as a "Billagotchi" that spoofs the Tamagotchi and Bill Gates). The game also has a storyline, in which players start out as tech support employees and must work their way up to a meeting with Bill Gates. In addition to containing a series of minigames, the game also offered enhancements to Windows 95, while extra content was available via the official website.

== Release and promotion ==
Reception

Review score
Publication	Score
MacAddict	2/4

The game's publication took place in Spencer, Indiana, and upon its release was shipped to retail chains such as Fry's Electronics, Egghead Software and CompUSA. The design of the game cover closely mimicked that of the Windows 95 packaging. During development, Parroty Interactive had planned to promote the game at the COMDEX computer expo by Fall in 1997. The presentation was to include a Bill Gates lookalike, however the staff were expelled by security from the convention and the distribution plan was shut down.

Despite this setback, the company presented their product at the Macworld expo in Silicon Valley, San Francisco next January, receiving praise from Macintosh users. At the event they demoed the CEO-themed Tamagotchi spoof "Billagotchi", and "Winblows Exploder" game where the player blows away error messages. CD copies of the game were sold in a booth for $20 each. Microsoft also debuted some new products at Macworld such as Office 98 and Internet Explorer 4.0. While noting that he was yet to examine the Palladium Interactive title, Microsoft spokesman Mark Murray commented "ours are probably a little more serious" than Microshaft Winblows 98, and the corporation "tr[ies] to have a sense of humor about this sort of thing". The product was also released in the French language.

Reviews in professional publications upon the game's publication were extremely positive. A common praise was the game's humor, which was described as "clever", "twisted", "relentlessly ... lampoon[ing]", "edgy", "offen[sive]", "first-rate", and comparable to the comedy group Monty Python. The Washington Times reviewer Joe Szadkowski described it as "devastatingly witty", "delightfully cruel", and the "coolest parody ever created", while hoping that Steve Jobs would find the title funny. Szadkowski thought Billagotchi was a "wicked takeoff" of the Tamagotchi, found the Bill Gates' eyeroll response in the pinball minigame to be a "visual highlight", and wrote that Gates TV became his favorite part of the program due to its "great character voices and hilarious artwork". David Duberman of Spectrum thought the game was Palladium Interactive's best work, praising its "fun ... surprises" and "clever, if not side-splitting, wordplay", and MacLedge's Michael Dixon found the minigames both "enjoyable" and "quite replayable".

In contrast, a MacAddict journalist was not as appreciative of the game's cruel comedy as other critics, giving the product an overall indifferent review, and ThemeWorld thought the program was not comprehensive enough to be considered a complete theme package. A 2011 retrospective review from PC Gamer panned Microshaft Winblows 98 for feeling made by "non-technical people desperately trying to write [tech geek] jokes in what may as well be a foreign language".
