= Mary Kay Bergman =

American voice actress and voice-over teacher (1961–1999)

- Born: June 5, 1961; Los Angeles, California, U.S.
- Died: November 11, 1999 (aged 38); Los Angeles, California, U.S.
- Cause of death: Suicide by firearm
- Burial place: Forest Lawn Memorial Park, Hollywood Hills, California, U.S.
- Other name: Shannen Cassidy
- Occupations: Voice actress; voice-over teacher
- Years active: 1978–1999
- Spouse: Dino Andrade (m. 1990)

Mary Kay Bergman (June 5, 1961 – November 11, 1999), also briefly credited as Shannen Cassidy, was an American voice actress and voice-over teacher. She was the official voice of the Disney character Snow White from 1989 to 1999 and the lead female voice actress on the adult animated television series South Park from the show's debut in 1997 until her death in 1999. Bergman was also the voice actress of Claudette and Laurette in Beauty and the Beast, Dr. Blight in Captain Planet and the Planeteers (replacing Meg Ryan), Katie in Family Dog, and Daphne Blake in the Scooby-Doo franchise from 1997 to 1999. Throughout her career, Bergman performed voice work for every aspect in media, including over 400 television commercials.

Bergman was born in Los Angeles, California. She had an interest in animation and impersonation early in her life. After acting in her first professional role in the television film Return Engagement, Bergman studied theater arts at UCLA for three years. Struggling to find a job suited for her, Bergman was trained under her voice-acting teacher Kat Lehman and started performing radio voiceovers. Bergman was chosen as the replacement of Snow White after a long search of talent agencies and voiceover classes. She joined The Groundlings to sharpen her voice acting skills, which contributed to her audition for Family Dog. In 1994, Bergman started teaching voice acting classes. In 1997, she was cast as nearly every female character in South Park after giving Trey Parker and Matt Stone ideas they originally did not have.

Bergman suffered generalized anxiety disorder in her private life. Her condition, which led to physical symptoms and severe stress, was kept private. On November 11, 1999, Bergman wrote two suicide notes and shot herself in the head. Shortly after she died, her widower, Dino Andrade, established the Mary Kay Bergman Memorial Fund.

== Life and career ==
=== 1961–1978: Early life ===
Bergman was born on June 5, 1961, in Los Angeles, California. An only child, her mother, Patricia McGowen, was an animation cel painter for Max Fleischer on Popeye cartoons in New York City. Her parents performed as a singing duo at lounges and clubs in Reno and Las Vegas, Nevada, and Los Angeles. They settled in Los Angeles after her mother became pregnant. Bergman was piqued by her mother's interest in animation, which led to a shared interest by watching Saturday-morning cartoons together.

At an early age, Bergman wanted to be a film star. Her early passion for impersonating was influenced by Snow White and the Seven Dwarfs, a film she watched in theaters at the age of six or seven. Bergman grew up around the corner from the home of Adriana Caselotti, the original voice of Snow White, whom she idolized. Bergman attended Joseph Le Conte Middle School and Hollywood High School.

=== 1978–1986: Career beginnings ===
At age 16, Bergman received her first professional acting job in the television film Return Engagement, which starred Elizabeth Taylor. However, Bergman's scene at the end of the film was ultimately cut out, which left her disappointed. Shortly, Bergman joined the Screen Actors Guild. Upon graduating from Hollywood High School in June 1978 with top academic honors, Bergman enrolled at UCLA and studied theater arts from 1978 until 1981. According to her husband, Dino Andrade, Bergman attended the university because she was a fan of Carol Burnett and wanted to attend the same university as Burnett did. Bergman was a classmate and friend of future The Simpsons voice actress Nancy Cartwright. After three years in the university, Bergman received a role in a play outside of school and dropped out to start her professional life.

Bergman joined a small agency in the valley of Los Angeles, which started six months before she joined. Bergman auditioned for an exercise program that was scheduled to appear on cable programming. A week after she received the role, the agency was closed, and reopened as a candy store. Bergman described the experience as "the worst agent story in the business". Her next role was as a receptionist for the Boy Scouts of America. Bergman enjoyed the job and was pleased to work with the people of the organization. She also received compliments about her speaking voice, which added to her frustration. Bergman also worked as a receptionist for an insurance company, and from there, she moved up the ranks to become an assistant underwriter, which she found "extremely boring". To break the monotony, Bergman thought about becoming a disc jockey but could not find information about where to take classes.

While working as a receptionist, Bergman received an invitation to a party from one of her co-workers at the insurance company. When Bergman attended the party, she danced and sang with a karaoke machine. Her impersonation of Ethel Merman caught the attention of voice-over teacher Kat Lehman. Bergman studied voice acting and took all Lehman's classes. After her final class, Bergman recorded a demo tape and was delivered to Bergman's first voice-acting agency, Abrams, Rubaloff, and Lawrence. Bergman soon quit her job as a receptionist after realizing that "squeezing auditions into her regular work schedule was not working". Her first voice role was a frightened woman in a radio commercial for a small home security company on a local station in 1986.

=== 1986–1993: Snow White and Family Dog ===
While performing radio voiceovers, Bergman found a part-time job at a department store to supplement her income. Bergman went with her personal agent Libby Westby after Westby switched agencies to Sutton, Barth, and Vennari. At around the same time, The Walt Disney Company was looking for a replacement for Adriana Caselotti, the original voice of Snow White, who was not always available to work. Bergman was chosen by former Disney executive Les Perkins after a "long and tedious search" of talent agencies and voiceover classes throughout Los Angeles. Upon learning that she would be the official replacement of Snow White, Bergman expressed trepidation, describing the voice as "very difficult". Her first voiceover appearance as Snow White was for a book on tape, but Bergman needed a day off for the recording. After her boss at a department store refused, Bergman had a choice to keep the job at a department store or do voiceover work as Snow White. She chose the latter, and she agreed to lend her voice only when Caselotti was unavailable. At its peak of popularity, Bergman was chosen to voice Dr. Blight in Captain Planet and the Planeteers by the producers of the show after Meg Ryan opted out. Bergman also voiced two of the Bimbettes, Claudette and Laurette, in Beauty and the Beast. She began doing matches for other actors such as Jodie Foster, Gillian Anderson, Helen Hunt, Julia Roberts, Jennifer Tilly, Emma Thompson, and Alfre Woodard.

To further improve her acting skills, Bergman joined The Groundlings, which helped her use her skills while auditioning for Family Dog. During audition, Bergman would be asked on "how [she act] to be sexy". She improvised "her best sexy dog" while feeling "like an idiot", worrying that she did "everything wrong" to the casting director. Three weeks after the audition, Bergman received a call notifying her that she not only received the role of Katie, but her tape was chosen out of hundreds that were submitted by Steven Spielberg. The show became one of Bergman's favorite projects. She stated that she would do five or six voices in each episode, which she enjoyed. Bergman also met Frank Welker, one of her mentors, which was considered a positive experience for her. Family Dog was scheduled to debut on March 20, 1991, but the show was ultimately pushed back until 1993 for the animation to be completed. The show's first episode debuted on June 23, 1993, on CBS.

=== 1993–1999: Academy Awards dubbing and South Park ===
When Disney was working on a restored version of Snow White and the Seven Dwarfs on LaserDisc, Caselotti was brought back in to record a rediscovered scene that was missing its audio track. After the studio executives listened to her work, they decided to bring in Bergman to record the voice instead. She also voiced Snow White for the 65th Academy Awards instead of Caselotti. Caselotti was unaware her voice had been replaced until the 65th Academy Awards when Snow White presented the award for Best Animated Short Film. In 1995, Bergman expressed dismay on voicing her for the ceremony, stating that it was "one of the most uncomfortable times in [her] entire career". Bergman also felt disappointed for her, expressing that a responsibility should be made to keep the character as an important part of Caselotti's career. Disney received hundreds of complaints after the ceremony, noting the changes to the Snow White character that Jeffrey Katzenberg had made, including a more modernized look to match her updated voice. Katzenberg issued written apologies, and Bergman did not publicly admit to voicing Snow White while Caselotti was still alive.

In 1994, Bergman started teaching the technique of doing voice-overs for animation at the Kalmenson & Kalmenson Studios in Burbank. Trey Parker and Matt Stone were looking for a different voice actress for the female characters in South Park, as they were unhappy with Karri Turner's performance in the series' unaired pilot. Bergman attended a recast in Los Angeles and gave them several ideas they originally did not have. The ideas she gave included portraying Liane Cartman as a "1950s sitcom-style mother", interjecting Sheila Broflovski's catchphrase "What, what, what!" when she gets flustered, and adding a lisp to Stan Marsh's sister, Shelley. Parker and Stone cast Bergman as nearly every female character in the series. Her characters included Liane Cartman, Sheila Broflovski, Shelly Marsh, Sharon Marsh, Carol McCormick, and Wendy Testaburger. In her interview with Entertainment Weekly in 1999, Bergman credited South Park for distancing her out of her reputation known for voicing characters in children's animation.

Although the show appealed to Bergman's "dark sense of humor", she was credited as Shannen Cassidy (taken from Shannen Doherty and David Cassidy) in the first two seasons due to the concerns that her voice role as Snow White would be taken out if the Walt Disney Company knew that she was in South Park. Additionally, Bergman's husband, Dino Andrade, noted that nobody believed that South Park was going to last. However, after South Park became a success, Shannen Cassidy began to receive copious amounts of fan mail and Bergman decided to abandon the alias. Bergman also performed 16 voices for the film South Park: Bigger, Longer & Uncut. She overdubbed nine separate voices for the film's song "Blame Canada". Bergman was nominated for Outstanding Individual Achievement for Voice Acting in an Animated Feature Production for her performance as Sheila Broflovski at the 27th Annie Awards.

== Personal life ==
Bergman married voice actor Dino Andrade on April 7, 1990. They remained married until her death. At the height of her popularity, Bergman started to physically suffer from insomnia, myalgia, and nausea. She was diagnosed with generalized anxiety disorder by her physician, which was determined to be caused by severe stress. She kept this diagnosis secret to everyone, including her husband, family, and friends. Bergman also privately admitted to her husband that she was afraid of losing her abilities and that her career would end because of her condition.

== Death and commemorations ==
On the morning of November 11, 1999, Bergman contributed to a radio program celebrating Disneyland's 45th anniversary, performing the voice of Snow White for a radio commercial. Later in the evening, Andrade returned to their home in the Los Angeles neighborhood of Venice to find that Bergman had fatally shot herself in the head, with two suicide notes, the first one for Andrade and the second one for John Bell, a close friend of the couple, stating that she could not "handle [her] fear anymore". Attorney Robert Harrison originally stated that Bergman had shown no signs of depression. The Los Angeles County Coroner's Office reported that the cause of death was ruled as a self-inflicted shotgun wound.

Bergman is buried at Forest Lawn Memorial Park in the Hollywood Hills. Andrade revealed that she was buried there since one of her biggest thrills was attending private screenings of Beauty and the Beast in the Walt Disney Company's original screening room, which is located near her grave.

=== Public reaction ===
News of Bergman's death was published on several websites, including South Park's website. The revelation triggered an outpouring of grief from her fans and friends. South Park creators Trey Parker and Matt Stone were initially "too distraught" to issue a statement. On March 2, 2000, during an interview at the Paley Center for Media, Parker and Stone spoke about Bergman and the challenge of replacing her work, stating they realized that "one person wasn't going to do it" because of her talent, and that it would take "a lot of talented voice people".

=== Memorial ===
On November 15, 1999, Sutton, Barth, and Vennari ran a full memorial to Bergman on the Variety magazine. To honor Bergman and encourage others to seek help, Dino Andrade established the Mary Kay Bergman Memorial Fund at the Suicide Prevention Center of Didi Hirsch Community Mental Health Center, which raised thousands of dollars toward the cause. Her official website, mkbmemorial.com, was converted to support a mental health program for those diagnosed with generalized anxiety disorder. The website is no longer active.

== Voice acting style ==
Bergman was known for her distinctive voice acting on her "sweet, cute little characters". Her voice-acting skills also increased over time, which included her experience with The Groundlings. Bergman credited the troupe with "honing her ability to come up with voices on demand", which included her skills when auditioning for Family Dog. In her interview with Entertainment Weekly in 1999, Bergman stated that she had "more of a range as [she has] gotten older".

== Influences ==
At an early age, Bergman envisioned herself becoming a film star. When Bergman was six or seven, her mother took her to watch a theatrical re-release of Snow White and the Seven Dwarfs. Bergman cited it as an inspiration to crossover from a mere fan to a performer, stating that the film "made a complete impression" on her. Shortly thereafter, Bergman began impersonating everything, including Lily Tomlin on Rowan & Martin's Laugh-In and her neighbor's barking dogs. Voice actor Frank Welker, one of Bergman's mentors, was also cited as an inspiration to her outlook.

== Successors ==
Bergman's friend and student Grey DeLisle inherited the role of Daphne Blake in the Scooby-Doo franchise. DeLisle said of her:

She was just the sweetest, most wonderful person in the world... and then she killed herself. Her husband came and stayed with me at my house, because he said, "I can't stay over there, it's too painful." And about a week later, they asked me to audition for Daphne ... and I didn't know what to do, because I just thought, "Gosh, I just don't know if I can do that." I told him, "They asked me to audition, but I'm not going to audition, because it's just weird." And he said, "Grey, you have to do it, because Mary Kay would've wanted you to do it. You were her star student, she loved you, and she would've wanted you to do Daphne. Somebody's going to do it. It might as well be someone who loved her." And I was, like, "I didn't really think about it like that." So I went in, and I didn't study it, because I just thought, "You know what? I'm just going to go in, and I'm just going to do my best interpretation of the character. I'm not going to try and sound-match her, because it would just be too sad to listen to her voice." So I went in, and Eddie – the engineer at the time – and Collette Sunderman, the director, she just said, "When you came in, Grey, it was just eerie. It was like there was some other hand in it, because you sounded exactly like Mary Kay." So I guess it was meant to be, because I didn't try. It just came out that way.

Voice actress Tara Strong, another friend and student of Bergman, replaced her as the voice of Timmy Turner in The Fairly OddParents.

== Filmography ==
=== Film ===
List of voice performances in feature and direct-to-video films
Year	Title	Role	Notes	Ref(s)
1991	Beauty and the Beast	Claudette, Laurette		
1996	The Hunchback of Notre Dame	Quasimodo's Mother, Djali		
1997	Annabelle's Wish	Hens		
1997	Hercules	Earthquake Lady, Nymphs, Teenage Girls, Athena		
1998	Batman & Mr. Freeze: SubZero	Barbara Gordon / Batgirl	Direct-to-video film	
1998	Kiki's Delivery Service	Old Woman	English dub	
1998	Mulan	Female Ancestor		
1998	Scooby-Doo on Zombie Island	Daphne Blake		
1998	Rusty: A Dog's Tale	Myrtle the Duck		
1998	The Brave Little Toaster to the Rescue	Additional voices	Direct-to-video film	
1999	The Brave Little Toaster Goes to Mars	Additional voices	Direct-to-video film	
1999	South Park: Bigger, Longer & Uncut	Liane Cartman, Sheila Broflovski, Sharon Marsh, Carol McCormick, Wendy Testaburger, Clitoris	Nominated - Annie Award for Voice Acting in a Feature Production	
1999	The Iron Giant	Hogarth (screaming and sleeping vocals)		
1999	Alvin and the Chipmunks Meet Frankenstein	Mother	Direct-to-video film	
1999	Scooby-Doo! and the Witch's Ghost	Daphne Blake	Direct-to-video film	
1999	Toy Story 2	Jessie (yodeling sounds)	Posthumous release	
1999	Maxine's Christmas Carol	Doris Lundquist, Billy's mom	Posthumous role	
2000	The Life & Adventures of Santa Claus	Martha, Nymph, Tycus	Direct-to-video film; posthumous release	
2000	Scooby-Doo and the Alien Invaders	Daphne Blake	Direct-to-video film; posthumous release; dedicated in memory	
2001	Lady and the Tramp II: Scamp's Adventure	Si the Siamese Cat	Direct-to-video film; posthumous release	
2002	Balto II: Wolf Quest	Cunning Trickster, Wolverine #3	Direct-to-video film; posthumous release (final film role)	

=== Television ===
List of voice performances in television
Year	Title	Role	Notes	Ref(s)
1983	Alvin and the Chipmunks	Additional voices	Episode: "The C-Team/The Chipettes"	
1991–1996	Captain Planet and the Planeteers	Dr. Blight, Blight-5, Betty Blight	27 episodes (replacing Meg Ryan)	
1992–1993	The Little Mermaid	Arista, Spot, additional voices	6 episodes	
1993	Family Dog	Katie, additional voices	4 episodes	
1993	The Wild West	Mattie, Eliza, May	Live-action Episode: "Cowboys/Settlers"	
1994	The Bears Who Saved Christmas	Holly	Television film	
1994	Fantastic Four	Princess Anelle, additional voices	Episode: "Behold, a Distant Star"	
1995	Annie: A Royal Adventure!	Miss Hannigan, New York Children, British Children	Live-action; television film	
1995	Sing Me a Story with Belle	Fifi, Hansel, Gretel, Elf, Witch, additional voices		
1995	Space Strikers	Additional voices	13 episodes	
1995	The Tick	Ants, Secretary, Ottoman	2 episodes	
1995	The Twisted Tales of Felix the Cat	Tickets, Mermaid, Girls	2 episodes	
1996	The Fantastic Voyages of Sinbad the Sailor	Daphne, Queen, Maiden Malamatr		
1996–1998	What a Cartoon!	Doris ("The Kitchen Casanova"), additional voices	6 episodes	
1997	Roar	Additional voices	Live-action	
1997	USA High	Ricki Lake	Live-action Episode: "Once Upon an Elevator"	
1997	Extreme Ghostbusters	Banshee	2 episodes	
1997–1998	Recess	Additional voices	15 episodes	
1997–1998	The New Adventures of Zorro	Ursula	26 episodes	
1997–1999	South Park	Wendy Testaburger, Sharon Marsh, Sheila Brofloski, Liane Cartman, Carol McCormick, Shelly Marsh, Principal Victoria, Mayor McDaniels, Ms. Crabtree, Nurse Gollum, Shari Lewis, Patty, Annie Knitts, Bebe Stevens, Rebecca Cotswolds, additional voices	Seasons 1–3; Credited as Shannen Cassidy in the first two seasons "Starvin' Marvin in Space" and "Mr. Hankey's Christmas Classics" dedicated in memory	
1998	Spider-Man: The Animated Series	Gwen Stacy	Episode: "Spider Wars, Chapter 2: Farewell, Spider-Man"	
1998	Adventures from the Book of Virtues	Marla, Gabriela, Princess, Old Woman	Episode: "Selflessness"	
1998	I Am Weasel	Sandy Weasel	Episode: "Honey, I Are Home"	
1998	Rugrats	Spokes, Friendly Boy	Episode: "Uneasy Rider/Where's Grandpa?"	
1998	Hercules	Artemis	Replacing Reba McEntire	
1998–2000	Jay Jay the Jet Plane	Jay Jay, Herky, Savannah, Revvin' Evan	38 episodes (some aired posthumously). Replaced by Debi Derryberry, and later Donna Cherry.	
1998–2001	Oh Yeah! Cartoons	Timmy Turner, additional voices	10 episodes, in the Fairly OddParents segment. Redubbed by Tara Strong in reruns.	
1999	The Scooby-Doo Project	Daphne Blake	Television special	
1998–1999	The Secret Files of the Spy Dogs	Mitzy, Ayanna, Timmy, Various others	Main role	
1999–2000	Men in Black: The Series	Queen Bug	3 episodes; posthumous role	
2000	Family Guy	Sherry	Episode: "The Story on Page One"; posthumous role	
2000	Buzz Lightyear of Star Command	Alien Mom, Alien Kid, Zurg's Answering Machine	Episode: "A Zoo Out There"; posthumous role	
2001	Big Guy and Rusty the Boy Robot	Pierre	2 episodes; posthumous role	

=== Video games ===
List of voice performances in video games
Year	Title	Role	Notes	Ref(s)
1993	Leisure Suit Larry 6: Shape Up or Slip Out!	Char Donay, Cav Vuarnet		
1995	Wanna Be A Dino Finder	Addie		
1996	Leisure Suit Larry: Love for Sail!	Drew Baringmore, Jamie Lee Coitus, Wydoncha Jugg, Peggy		
1996	Normality	Heather	US release	
1996	Someone's in the Kitchen!	Toby Toaster, Sugar, Tomato		
1996	Disney's Animated Storybook: 101 Dalmatians	Perdita / Anita		
1997	101 Dalmatians: Escape from DeVil Manor	Anita		
1997	Ready to Read with Pooh	Singing Honey Pots		
1997	I Can Be a Dinosaur Finder	Addie the Kangaroo		
1997	The Curse of Monkey Island	Minnie "Stronie" Goodsoup (Ghost Bride)		
1997	The X-Fools: The Spoof is Out There	Dede Scudder		
1998	I Can Be an Animal Doctor	Addie the Kangaroo		
1998	South Park	Liane Cartman, Wendy Testaburger, Shelly Marsh		
1998	Leisure Suit Larry's Casino	Cavaricchi Vuarnet, Drew Baringmore, Wydoncha Jugg, Female Announcer, Miss Bowling, Peggy		
1998	Disney's Math Quest with Aladdin	Fortune Teller		
1998	Disney's Animated Storybook: Mulan	Ancestor		
1998	Mulan Story Studio	Ancestor		
1998	King's Quest: Mask of Eternity	Apothecary Gnome, Swamp Witch		
1998	Arthur's Math Carnival	D.W., Muffy, Francine, Prunella, The Brain		
1998	Gabriel Knight: Sins of the Fathers	Gerde, Little Boy, Old Lady		
1999	Arthur's Brain Teasers	D.W., Muffy, Francine, Prunella, The Brain		
1999	Star Wars: Episode I – The Phantom Menace	Additional voices		
1999	Disney's Princess Fashion Boutique	Snow White		
1999	Scooby-Doo! Mystery of the Fun Park Phantom	Daphne Blake	Posthumous release	
2000	Arthur's Thinking Games	D.W., Muffy, Francine, Prunella, The Brain	Posthumous release	
2000	South Park Rally	Wendy Testaburger, Mayor McDaniels, Freda, Ms. Crabtree, Shelly Marsh	Posthumous release	
2000	Alundra 2	Milena, Natasha, Royal Boy C	Posthumous release	
2000	Tenchu 2: Birth of the Stealth Assassins	Kagami	Posthumous release	

=== Theme parks ===
List of voice performances in amusement parks
Year	Title	Role	Notes	Ref(s)
2005	Robots of Mars 3D Adventure	Bette, Tiny Robot	Posthumous release	

=== Live-action ===
List of acting performances in feature and television films
Year	Title	Role	Notes	Ref(s)
1978	Return Engagement	Mary	Television film	
1999	South Park	Woman	Live-action footage	
1999	Goin' Down to South Park	Self	Documentary	
2000	Bob's Video	Lady in Red, Telephone Voice, Radio Dispatcher	Posthumous release	

List of acting performances in television
Year	Title	Role	Notes
1999	Nightcap	Self	Posthumous role, dedicated in memory

== Sources ==
- Lawson, Tim; Persons, Alisa (2004). The Magic Behind the Voices: A Who's Who of Cartoon Voice Actors. University Press of Mississippi. ISBN 1-57806-695-6.
- Frater, Jamie (November 2010). Listverse.com's Ultimate Book of Bizarre Lists: Fascinating Facts and Shocking Trivia on Movies, Music, Crime, Celebrities, History, and More. Simon and Schuster. ISBN 9781569758854.
