= Nerd Poker =

Comedy and games podcast

- Genre: Comedy; Adventure; Role-playing
- Language: English

Cast and voices
- Hosted by: Brian Posehn; Blaine Capatch; Ken Daly; Sarah Guzzardo; Dan Telfer; Chris Tallman

Music
- Opening theme: "Destroy the Orcs" by 3 Inches of Blood (Earwolf, season 2–5); "Dungeon Master" by Visigoth (season 1); "One Quarter Viking, Three Quarter’s Pussy" by Brian Posehn (season 6–)

Production
- Length: 60 minutes

Publication
- No. of episodes: Independent: 407; Bonus: 273; Earwolf: 153
- Original release: November 28, 2012 – November 25, 2015 April 26, 2017 – present
- Updates: Weekly

Related
- Website: nerdpokerpod.com

Nerd Poker (formerly Nerd Poker with Brian Posehn and Friends, currently Brian Posehn's Nerd Poker) is a weekly comedy and adventure podcast that primarily features comedian Brian Posehn and his friends as they play the Dungeons & Dragons tabletop role-playing game.

== History ==
The show formally began releasing episodes in 2012 on the Earwolf network, but left the network to become independent. Co-hosts include comedians Blaine Capatch and Dan Telfer, actors Ken Daly and Chris Tallman, and writer Sarah Guzzardo. The podcast has alternated several co-hosts through the years, and stems from a real-life ongoing game that also included comedian Patton Oswalt. Former co-hosts Gerry Duggan, Mr. Sark, and Steve Agee have left the show but returned as guests.

The show's Dungeon Master (carrying over the tradition from before the show was on the air) was originally Mr. Sark. Later those duties were handed off to Blaine Capatch, then Dan Telfer.

== Format ==
The show originated using the second edition of Dungeons & Dragons, switched to fourth edition, went back to second, then finally settled on fifth edition when the show rebooted as an independent podcast in 2017.

Previously on the Earwolf podcast network, the show went by a simple episode format. As the show has developed into a longer and independent program, it has been divided into seasons. Season 1 was 42 episodes long, Season 2 was 47 episodes, Season 3 was a much longer 85 episodes, and Season 4 is currently at 58 episodes.

Though they have played the Tomb of Annihilation pre-made adventure for their Patreon supporters as bonus episodes, the majority of the podcast consists of stories created by the respective Dungeon Masters. Some bonus episodes have also featured "Danger Rooms," one-off adventures nicknamed after the training room used by the X-Men. Guests on bonus episodes have included Paget Brewster, Jackie Kashian, Joe Manganiello, Matthew Mercer, Marisha Ray, and Paul F. Tompkins.

== See also ==
- Critical Role
