= Blaine Capatch =

American stand-up comedian and writer

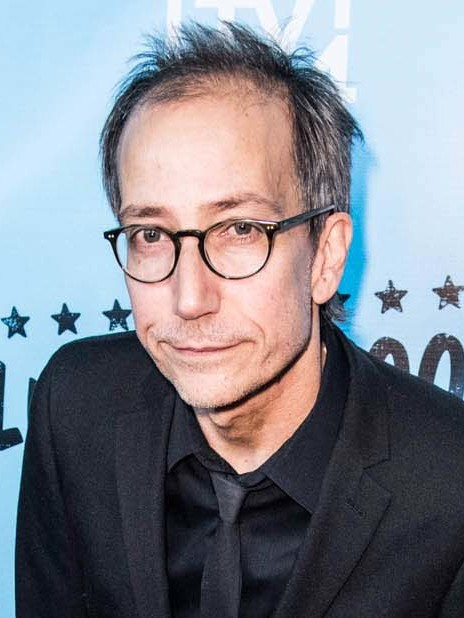
- Capatch in 2018
- Born: September 19, 1965 (age 61); York, Pennsylvania, U.S.
- Notable work: Beat The Geeks
- Spouse: Vera Duffy (m. 2005)

Comedy career
- Years active: 1985–present
- Medium: Stand up
- Website: blainecapatch.com

Blaine Harold Capatch (born September 19, 1965) is an American stand-up comedian and writer. He is best known for hosting Season 2 of the Comedy Central game show Beat the Geeks.

Capatch was born in York, Pennsylvania, to Jean and Harold Capatch. He grew up in the small town of Dallastown, Pennsylvania, where his father owned and operated a barber shop. He is a 1983 graduate of Dallastown Area High School. After high school he attended York College of Pennsylvania. He began his stand-up career in Baltimore, Maryland, at the Charm City comedy club.

Capatch and then-comedy partner Patton Oswalt worked as sketch writers in the early years of MADtv. He also wrote for The Martin Short Show, Blue Collar TV, The Jamie Kennedy Experiment, Mind of Mencia, Web Soup, and Comedy Central's Roast of Roseanne Barr, amongst others.

He hosted a comedic quiz show on the Comedy Channel from 2001 to 2002, called Beat the Geeks. The program reached 130 episodes, and saw international broadcast in Canada and New Zealand after its original run.

Since 2002, he has hosted the live burlesque/Mexican wrestling show Lucha VaVOOM in Los Angeles, California.

Since 2005, he has been a live announcer for the Los Angeles Derby Dolls, a banked track roller derby league.

In 2007, Capatch appeared in the "Comedians of Comedy: Live at the Troubador".

From 2008 to 2014 he hosted the weekly comedy show, What's Up Tiger Lily?, created by Maria Bamford and Melinda Hill in Los Angeles, California.

Since November 28, 2012, he has participated in a podcast called Nerd Poker hosted by Brian Posehn.

Capatch was a writer on Comedy Central's @Midnight hosted by Chris Hardwick from 2013 to 2017.
