= Learning Adventures! =

Learning Adventures
- Series Logo
- Genre(s): Educational
- Developer(s): Cloud 9 Interactive
- Publisher(s): Macmillan Digital Publishing
- Creator(s): Bill Zullo
- Platform(s): Windows, Macintosh
- First release: I Can Be a Dinosaur Finder; 1997
- Latest release: I Can Be an Animal Doctor; 1998

Learning Adventures series is a set of two games of point-and-click educational computer games developed by Cloud 9 Interactive, published by Macmillan Digital Publishing and released on both Windows and Macintosh on CD-ROM.

The series consists of the titles "I can be a Dinosaur Finder" (Paleontologist) released in 1997 and "I can be an Animal Doctor" (Veterinarian) released in 1998. The games revolve around three characters Addie the kangaroo (voiced by Mary Kay Bergman), Rufus the dog (voiced by Jeannie Elias) and Katie the chameleon (voiced by Debi Derryberry,) who dive into a special chest to go on adventures.

== Games ==
=== I can be a Dinosaur Finder ===
Addie, Rufus and Katie go to a dig site to help Dr. Rock Hound (voiced by Ed Gilbert) to excavate and assemble a prehistoric animal's skeleton and become official fossil finders.

In this game, players learn about paleontology, uncovering fossils, the different time periods of prehistory and prehistoric animal species (most notably dinosaurs). There are also nine extra activities.

=== I can be an Animal Doctor ===
Addie, Rufus and Katie go to an animal hospital to aid Dr. Max Rigby (voiced by Jody Carlisle) in the care of injured and sick animals.

In this game, players learn how to treat wild and domestic animals afflicted with some ailment, using the correct treatments for different ailments.

== Reception ==
Reception

Award
Publication	Award
Family PC	1997 Best of Show Software

The game was recommended by the American Humane Association.
