= Live In: Nerd Rage =

Live album by Brian Posehn
- Released: July 11, 2006
- Recorded: October 2004 – May 2005
- Genre: Comedy
- Length: 58:11
- Label: Relapse Records
- Producer: Geoff Green; Brian Posehn

Brian Posehn chronology
| Live In: Nerd Rage (2006) | Fart and Wiener Jokes (2010) |

Professional ratings
Review scores
| Source | Rating |
|---|---|
| AllMusic | 4/5 stars |

Live In: Nerd Rage is Brian Posehn's debut comedy album. It also contains two original songs, including "Metal by Numbers," which was released as a single in 2006.

== Track listing ==
1. Opening/I'm a Good Friend - 1:28
2. Dork for Thirty Years - 3:12
3. Married Life - Sorry Fat Dudes - 5:17
4. Puppy Time - 2:58
5. Religion's Weird - 2:05
6. Movie Ruiners/The Unholy Trilogy - 5:44
7. Monkey Birthday - 2:34
8. Reunion - 1:11
9. No Dirty Magazines - 1:29
10. Show a Little Neck - 1:54
11. Late Night TV - 2:32
12. The News - 1:39
13. Quitting Pot - 1:26
14. Baby/Kitty Porn - 3:18
15. War's Over/New Boobs - 1:32
16. Nerd Rage/The Mattress Story - 2:57
17. Yelling Stuff - 4:57
18. Metal by Numbers - 4:18
19. Titannica Interview - 2:57
20. Try Again, Again - 4:54

== Personnel ==
- Brian Posehn - Performer, Vocals, Producer, Mixing, Photography, Screams
- Geoff Green - Producer, Mixing
- Curt Wells - Audio Recording
- Bob Odenkirk - Sketches
- Jonathan Donais - Guitar
- Scott Ian - Guitar
- Russ Parrish - Soloist
- John Tempesta - Drums
- Titannica - Performer
- Joey Vera - Bass
- Jennie de Shazer - Photography
- Timothy Leo - Design
- Joe Giron - Photography
