= The Fartist =

Live album by Brian Posehn
- Released: June 25, 2013
- Genre: Stand-up comedy
- Length: 56:58
- Label: New Wave Dynamics
- Producer: Brian Posehn

Brian Posehn chronology
Fart and Wiener Jokes (2010)	The Fartist (2013)	Grandpa Metal (2020)

Professional ratings
Review scores
Source	Rating
Allmusic	4/5 stars

The Fartist is a live comedy album by Brian Posehn. It was released in 2013 under New Wave Dynamics. The album's name and cover derives from the 2011 French film The Artist. PlutoTV streaming service has featured the program on the StandUp comedy channel.

== Track listing ==
1. For My Wife - 1:24
2. Strippers and Stripping - 3:02
3. The Tale of a Stripper - 2:13
4. Quitting Weed - 3:12
5. The Scariest Pot Story Ever Told - 4:26
6. Do Not Punch My Baby - 5:07
7. Um... My Farts - 3:27
8. My Fart Meets Someone Famous - 6:57
9. Getting Old - 6:17
10. The Acopapypse - 4:55
11. Weird Al - 2:07
12. Taking Care of Business - 2:28
13. Getting Back on the Horse - 4:10
14. Dirty Jokes - 3:25
15. Star Wars, Pt. 3 (Yes, I'm Still Mad About Star Wars) - 3:48
