= Fart and Wiener Jokes =

Live album by Brian Posehn
- Released: April 27, 2010
- Recorded: 2010
- Genre: Comedy
- Length: 57:46
- Label: Relapse

Brian Posehn chronology
Live In: Nerd Rage (2006)	Fart and Wiener Jokes (2010)	The Fartist (2013)

Professional ratings
Review scores
Source	Rating
AllMusic	3.5/5 stars

Fart and Wiener Jokes is a comedy album by comedian Brian Posehn containing stand-up comedies and two metal songs. The album features guest work from musicians such as Scott Ian (Anthrax), Jamey Jasta (Hatebreed), Mark Morton (Lamb of God), Brendon Small (Dethklok), John Tempesta (Testament, Rob Zombie), Joey Vera (Armored Saint, Fates Warning), Mark Osegueda (Death Angel) and Brett Anderson (The Donnas), all guests, among others.

== Track listing ==
1. "Intro/Fart and Wiener Jokes" – 1:02
2. "Itunes" – 2:22
3. "Cuddling" – 3:55
4. "Valet In the Valley" – 2:12
5. "Metal Fans" – 0:32
6. "Slayer" – 1:02
7. "Tip for the Couples" – 0:45
8. "My Four Hobbies Redux" – 0:39
9. "Clubbing/Plastic Surgery" – 1:45
10. "Horrible Night Out in L.A." – 1:52
11. "My Mirror Works/Things I Can't Do" – 2:21
12. "Home Protection" – 3:02
13. "Strip Clubs" – 2:18
14. "Bachelor Party" – 4:34
15. "Party Like a Rockstar" – 2:48
16. "Increase Your Loads" – 1:56
17. "Wikipedia" – 2:10
18. "Obama" – 1:42
19. "Having a Baby" – 0:32
20. "Lost a Friend" – 0:58
21. "Nice tits, Tough Guy" – 1:29
22. "Where Do I Know This Guy From?" – 3:09
23. "Obi Wan Story" – 3:05
24. "Kate Beckinsale" – 2:53
25. "More Metal Than You" (feat. Brett Anderson of The Donnas, Brendon Small of Dethklok, and Mark Morton of Lamb Of God) (Metal song) – 5:03
26. "The Gambler" (Metal song; Kenny Rogers Cover) (feat. Jamey Jasta of Hatebreed) – 3:28
