= Star Warped =

1997 video game

- Developer: Parroty Interactive
- Publisher: Palladium Interactive
- Directors: Steven Horowitz; Ian Deitchman
- Producers: Dale Geist; Jennifer Abbot Bulka
- Writers: Mark Cohen; Ian Deitchman; Brian Posehn; Kristin Rusk
- Platforms: Microsoft Windows, Macintosh
- Release: June 1997
- Genre: Adventure
- Mode: Single-player

Star Warped is a 1997 first-person point-and-click adventure video game that parodies the Star Wars universe, specifically the original trilogy released between 1977 and 1983: Star Wars, The Empire Strikes Back, and Return of the Jedi. It was created by Parroty Interactive, which was a division of the game's publisher, Palladium Interactive. Star Warped was released in the United States and Canada, for both Windows PC and Macintosh, in late 1997 as a follow-up to their debut Myst parody, Pyst. The game is no longer in release, as Parroty's parent company folded after being bought by The Learning Company in 1998. The game invited players to "Be seduced by the power of the Dork Side". Star Warped received mixed reviews from critics: some praised the game's variety, originality, and humor, while others dismissed it as lazy, unfunny, and dull.

== Plot and gameplay ==
The game is set in the Modesto, California, home of two die-hard Star Wars fans with a "Beavis and Butt-Head mentality": Brian (Brian Posehn) and Aaron (Robbie Rist). They claim to have never left their room since first watching the original Star Wars trilogy. The two have compiled their "favorite snagged, borrowed and stolen" Star Wars merchandise, and the player can interact with these items. Gameplay primarily consists of a series of mini-games, including "Whack! the Ewok" and "Flawed Fighters", a spoof of fighting games such as Mortal Kombat. Characters include Leia I. Joe (a Princess Leia and G.I. Joe spoof), Cool-Handless Luke (Luke Skywalker with a missing hand and a pun on the film Cool Hand Luke), and Pizza-Flipping Greedo (Greedo as a pizza chef). The game also has several humorous items, such as "scrapped scripts", "gene splicer", and "Tell you, I Will". Clicking on items results in animations and minigames. The minigames also included "U Don't No Jedi", "Death Star Destructo", "X-Schwing", and "Dork Forces".

According to GameSpot's Helen Lee, Star Warped differs from Parroty's previous game Pyst in that it is a fully-fledged game instead of just an interactive product, and the parody trampled over all aspects of the Star Wars trilogy. As the game was released two years before Star Wars: Episode I – The Phantom Menace, it contains no parodies alluding to the prequel series, but there are some fake references to the then-future films. While spoofing the first three films in the Star Wars film series, the game also targets the extended Star Wars franchise, including its merchandise and marketing strategies.

== Development ==
According to Palladium's then-vice president of marketing, Rob Halligan, the success of Pyst opened doors for future parody titles by the company, and Star Warped and The X-Fools (the latter a parody of The X-Files) were the first two they attempted.

Once Palladium ironed out "legal entanglements", the company hoped to release the game in May 1997. Writers for the project included comedy veterans from Saturday Night Live, The Simpsons, Comedy Central, and The Jon Stewart Show. After the jokes were approved and the writing completed, the developers had the voice actors record dialogue and, afterwards, put the game information onto CDs made available for retail purchase by customers.

The game features notable voice-acting talent in minor roles, including Tom Kenny, Carlos Alazraqui, Jodi Benson, Maurice LaMarche, and Kath Soucie. It was also released in Germany with dubbed German voice acting.

== Release and promotion ==
Star Warped was featured in a segment on the magazine-style program Splat! about cartoons in video games, which aired on animation specialty channel Teletoon. Following in the footsteps of Pyst, Star Warped had its own website players could access. After buying the game and registering, players were able to enter a member's-only section of the site, where new content was added until 1998. AllGame writer Christopher Michael Baker notes that even unregistered visitors to the website are still able to "check out and laugh at" some activities, minigames, and other content. An online-only quiz-themed minigame entitled "You Don't NoJedi" (a parody of You Don't Know Jack) was featured on the site, as a teaser for Star Warped. Bonus modules from Star Warped were featured on the CD for "Pyst Special Edition". In 1998, after Parroty's acquisition by The Learning Company, Palladium founder and chief executive officer Ed Bernstein said that "it was a fun business, but not terribly lucrative".

== Critical reception ==
Star Warped received mixed reviews and polarized critics. Positive reviews highlighted the game's humor, originality, and gameplay, with some favorably comparing it to Parroty Interactive's previous title Pyst, which they viewed more as an interactive slideshow than a game. Negative reviews derided the game's humor, comparing it to cartoons like the Star Wars Holiday Special.

Electric Games recommended the game for its "very, very funny" humor, "cartoony" graphics, "hammy" acting, "fun" gameplay, and "impressive . . . highly original" mini-games (praising the "Scrapped Scripts"). Doug Radcliffe of CD Mag praised one mini-game's "Pulp Fiction-style" script, but thought players would get bored after a few hours due to its lacking replay value. Christopher Michael Baker from All Game Guide deemed Star Warped the most "entertaining" of all Star Wars parody video games due to its variety of "fun", "great", and "hilarious" mini-games; the site also found the opportunity to delve into the personal belongings of the Star Wars super fans fascinating, deeming their collection "interesting" and "creative", and ultimately recommending the game for Star Wars fans. Additionally, America Online's Huge Electronic Brain named the game the "Funniest CD-ROM of the Century". Joe Szadkowski of The Washington Post thought the game was "well worth" the $20 price tag, and reminded readers that the game was a parody, not to be taken seriously. Star Warped was the video game that Kill Screen writer Zach Koster credited the game for his decision to become a video game journalist. Emil Pagliarulo of The Adrenaline Vault saw Star Warped as an example of how Parroty Interactive made games that were "completely original simply by capitalizing on unoriginality", and said it "pokes fun at just about every Star Wars game ever made". A writer from CD Access described the game as "hilarious", offering hours of entertaining gameplay.

Interpreting the game as a tribute to nerd culture, Steven L. Kent of The Seattle Times described Brian and Aaron as "charming" and noted the "eerie sense of reality" surrounding their collection of memorabilia, but felt that the mini-games were a "quick diversion", lacking depth. He thought that "Space Zap" and "Death Star Destructo" were the most enjoyable mini-games. Computer Gaming Magazine described Star Warped as a collection of mini-games, while Pyst was simply a "slideshow".

Richard Cobblet of PC Gamer thought the game was "pretty bloody awful", "agonizing", "painful", "uninspired", and "lazy", and compared it unfavorably with the Star Wars Holiday Special, while accusing Parroty Interactive of producing a series of "comedy plague-pits". A writer from Entertainment Weekly gave the game a D, deeming it a "catastrophe" of lowbrow humor, low-rent mini-games, and criticizing the "irritating...obnoxious" protagonists' commentary. A reviewer from The Collection Chamber thought the video game was "unlicensed, unofficial and woefully unfunny". German review site PC Games gave the game 23 out of 100, commenting on the game's lack of a funny bone and "non-starter" gags; it recommended that PC Games readers save their money, and, instead, buy the Special Edition versions of Star Wars. Another German review site, PC Action, compared Star Warped to Pyst, saying it offered more variety than the Myst parody, but noted that players would likely get bored after an hour of gameplay. It concluded with saying that the "modest" cost of the game was not worth the "cheap concoction", and that players were better off spending their money on the original Star Wars sextet.
