= J. P. Manoux =

American actor (born 1969)

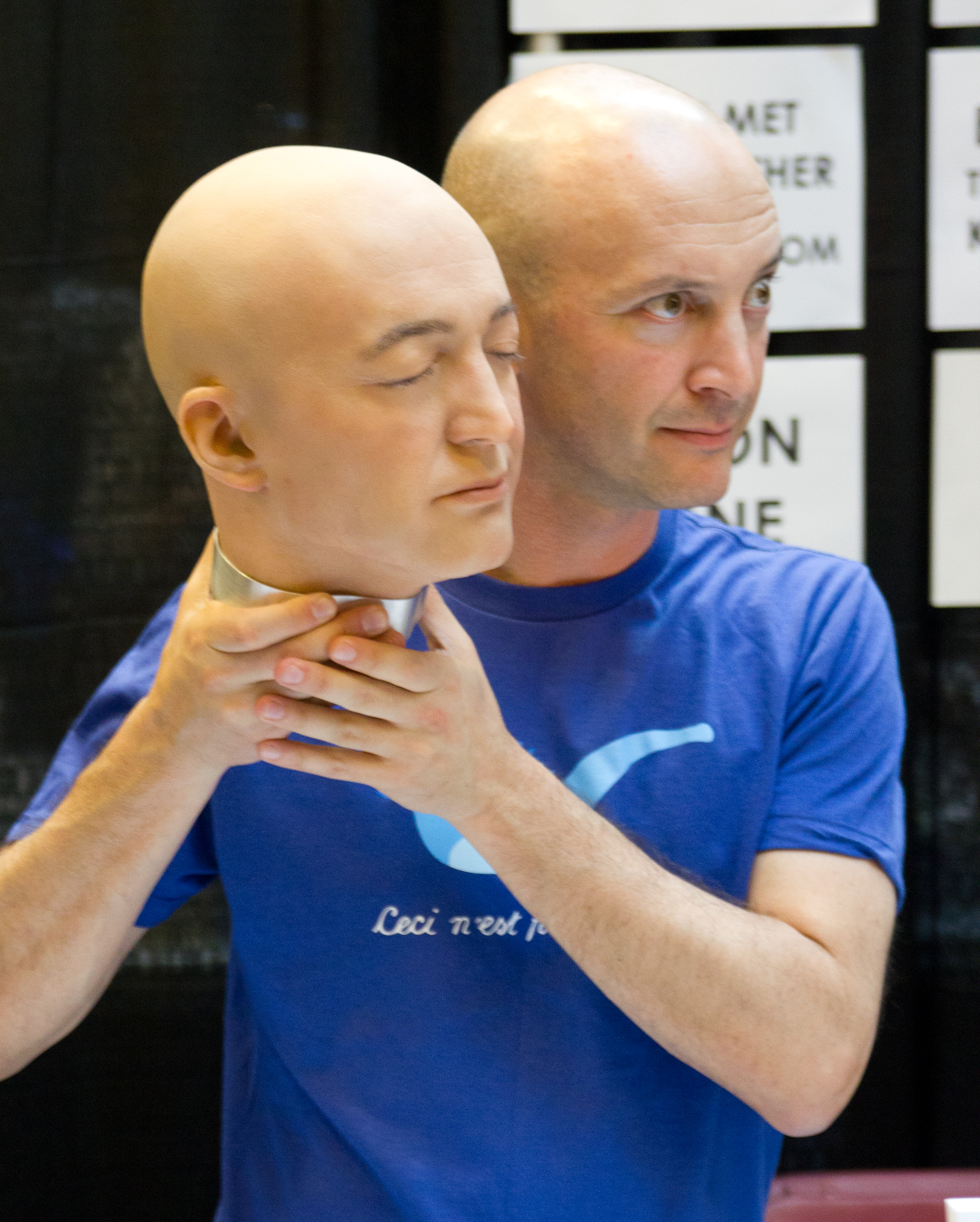
- Manoux at the 2012 Fan Expo Canada
- Born: Jean-Paul Manoux; June 8, 1969 (age 57); Fresno, California, U.S.
- Education: Northwestern University
- Occupations: Actor; director; writer
- Years active: 1986–present
- Website: jpmanoux.com

Jean-Paul Manoux (born June 8, 1969) is an American actor, director and writer. He is perhaps best known for his work on multiple Disney television series. He played S.T.A.N. the android in Aaron Stone, both Curtis the Caveman and Vice Principal Hackett in Phil of the Future, and voiced Kuzco in The Emperor's New School. Before fame, Manoux was a contestant on Jeopardy!, Family Feud, and Wheel of Fortune. He also starred in the CTV sitcom Spun Out.

== Early life ==
Jean-Paul Manoux was born in Fresno, California on June 8, 1969. He is of Armenian and French descent, with his Armenian grandparents fleeing the Armenian Genocide. He grew up in Santa Barbara, California, the eldest of seven children. He attended Thacher School in Ojai, California and Northwestern University in Evanston, Illinois. Upon graduating and moving to Hollywood, Manoux studied improv and sketch comedy at L.A. Theatresports, ACME Comedy Theatre, The Groundlings School, and iO West.

== Career ==
One of Manoux's early roles was as a regular performer on The Wayne Brady Show. He went on from there to work extensively in television and commercials, including campaigns for Got Milk? and Fruit of the Loom. Manoux portrayed Dr. Dustin Crenshaw in two of the later seasons of ER. Other memorable guest star roles in television series include How I Met Your Mother, Angel, Smallville, Charmed, Scrubs, and Community. He has also appeared in episodes of Grey's Anatomy, Shameless, Will & Grace, and recurred on Veep, CSI: Vegas, and Swedish Dicks.

Manoux has portrayed a character impersonating musician Moby in the How I Met Your Mother episode "The Limo", and has featured for a four-episode run on Community as the "Doppel-Deaner"; a doppelganger/lookalike of the character portrayed by Jim Rash. He has also played a mime on more than one occasion, briefly on ER (1996), years before he became a recurring character there, and in EuroTrip (2004).

He has made small appearances in two Michael Bay films: Transformers, where he was a man being interviewed on television, and in The Island, where he portrayed a mentally underdeveloped clone.

Manoux has also provided voice work in several films and animated television shows, including Scrappy Rex and Brainiac Scooby in Scooby-Doo and Scooby-Doo 2: Monsters Unleashed and most notably as the voice of Kuzco in various Disney projects, including House of Mouse, Mickey's Magical Christmas: Snowed in at the House of Mouse, The Emperor's New School and The Emperor's New Groove: The Video Game.

Manoux has directed episodes of Aaron Stone, Phil of the Future, Mudpit and Spun Out. He has also written for The Wayne Brady Show, The X-Fools video game, Microshaft Winblows 98 and he co-wrote the comedic circus tragedy Tights on a Wire with George Brant.

He has authored and read two pieces for NPR's All Things Considered. Back in 2000, he provided commentary on the Screen Actors Guild strike as a striking actor who refused to do any scab work.

== Legal dispute ==
In 2015, Manoux appeared in Canadian court after two people staying in his Toronto condominium discovered a home security camera and reported it to the police. On July 30, 2015, the charge of voyeurism against him was dropped. In January 2017, he was convicted of mischief regarding the incident.

== Filmography ==
=== Film ===
| Year | Title | Role | Notes |
|---|---|---|---|
| 1994 | Pumpkinhead II: Blood Wings | Tommy | Direct-to-video |
| 1996 | Clinic E | Eric | Short |
| 1997 | Fairfax Fandango | Andy | Short |
| 1998 | Art House | Beezer | |
| 1999 | Treasure Island | Officer Hughes | Direct-to-video |
| 1999 | The Auteur Theory | Unknown Filmmaker / Mike Dong | |
| 1999 | Inspector Gadget | Mayor's Sycophantic Assistant | |
| 1999 | Galaxy Quest | Excited Alien (voice) | |
| 2000 | Our Lips Are Sealed | Robber | Direct-to-video |
| 2001 | Mickey's Magical Christmas: Snowed in at the House of Mouse | Kuzco (voice) | Direct-to-video |
| 2001 | Ocean's Eleven | Aide-de-Camp | |
| 2002 | Crazy as Hell | Arnie | |
| 2002 | Scooby-Doo | Scrappy Rex (voice) | |
| 2003 | Malibu's Most Wanted | Gary | |
| 2004 | EuroTrip | Robot Man | |
| 2004 | Scooby Doo 2: Monsters Unleashed | Scooby Brainiac (voice) | |
| 2004 | The Day After Tomorrow | L.A. Cameraman | |
| 2004 | Meet the Fockers | Local Cop | |
| 2005 | Tennis, Anyone...? | P. J. Monet | |
| 2005 | The Island | Seven Foxtrot | Uncredited |
| 2005 | The Trouble with Dee Dee | Yugo | |
| 2006 | The Beach Party at the Threshold of Hell | TV Dad | |
| 2007 | Reno 911!: Miami | Naked Armenian | Uncredited |
| 2007 | What We Do Is Secret | Rodney Bingenheimer | |
| 2007 | Knocked Up | Dr. Angelo | |
| 2007 | Transformers | Witness | |
| 2008 | Trailer Park of Terror | Cigrit | Direct-to-video |
| 2008 | Minutemen | Vice Principal Tolkan | Disney Channel Original Movie |
| 2008 | An Inconvenient Head | Doctor | Short |
| 2008 | Finding Amanda | Tony Clark | |
| 2008 | Get Smart's Bruce and Lloyd: Out of Control | Neil | Direct-to-video |
| 2008 | Bolt | Tom (voice) | |
| 2009 | Weather Girl | Raymond | |
| 2009 | A Heart Too Tender | Desperate Actor | Short |
| 2012 | Beverly Hills Chihuahua 3: Viva la Fiesta! | Gustavo | Direct-to-video |
| 2012 | Atlas Shrugged: Part 2 | Conductor | |
| 2012 | Hail Satan | Aleister | Short |
| 2013 | Scary Movie 5 | Pierre | |
| 2013 | Jimmy Giraffe's Flying Car | Tunnels the Gopher (voice) | Short |
| 2014 | Back To Christmas | Waiter | |
| 2015 | Gridlocked | Finn | |
| 2015 | Solitary | Eric | Short |
| 2019 | Queen Bee | Wade Turner | Short |
| 2020 | Greatland | Presenter | |
| 2021 | Nobody | Darren | |
| 2021 | Ruby's Dad | Hotel Employee | Short |
| 2022 | Babylon | Otto's Camera Assistant | Uncredited |
| 2026 | Stop! That! Train! | Mime | Uncredited |
| 2026 | The Odyssey | Beggar | Uncredited |

=== Dubbing ===
| Original year | Dub year | Title | Role | Notes |
|---|---|---|---|---|
| 1988 | 2005 | My Neighbor Totoro | Additional voices | Walt Disney Pictures edition |

=== Television ===
| Year | Title | Role | Notes |
|---|---|---|---|
| 1986 | Wheel of Fortune | Himself/Contestant | |
| 1989 | Family Feud | Himself/Contestant | |
| 1993 | Jeopardy! | Himself/Contestant | |
| 1996 | The John Larroquette Show | Student No. 1 | Episode: "The Master Class" |
| 1996 | Encino Woman | Motivational Tape Narrator (voice) | Television film |
| 1996–2008 | ER | Dr. Dustin Crenshaw / Mime | 24 episodes |
| 1997 | Working | Jr. Executive | Episode: "Close Quarters" |
| 1998 | For Your Love | Shelter Director | Episode: "The Gift That Keeps on Giving" |
| 1998 | 3rd Rock from the Sun | Clerk | Episode: "Collect Call for Dick" |
| 1998 | Maggie | Ted | Episode: "The Greatest Story Ever Toad" |
| 1998 | Reunited | Father Stasniak | Episode: "Where Is Joanne Going, and When?" |
| 1998 | Becker | Rusty | Episode: "My Dinner with Becker" |
| 1998 | Breakfast with Einstein | Chihuahua Owner | Television film |
| 1998–1999 | Just Shoot Me! | Glenn | 3 episodes |
| 1999 | Suddenly Susan | Lukaro | Episode: "Wedding Bell Blues" |
| 1999 | Caroline in the City | Customer | Episode: "Caroline and the Ultimatum" |
| 1999 | Oh, Grow Up | Marc | Episode: "Love Stinks" |
| 1999 | The Darwin Conspiracy | Roger | Television film |
| 2000 | Stark Raving Mad | Lewis | Episode: "My Bodyguard" |
| 2000 | Brutally Normal | Twitch | Episode: "Stretching Ethics" |
| 2000 | Shasta McNasty | Nicolai | 2 episodes |
| 2000 | The Drew Carey Show | Malcolm | Episode: "Drew Goes to Hell" |
| 2000 | Opposite Sex | A-Tech Guy | Episode: "The Virgin Episode" |
| 2000 | Bull | N/A | Episode: "In the Course of Human Events" |
| 2000 | Angel | Frank Gilnitz | Episode: "Are You Now or Have You Ever Been" |
| 2000 | The Norm Show | Thomas | Episode: "I've Got a Crush on You" |
| 2000 | Running Mates | Carl – Producer No. 1 | Television film |
| 2001 | Nikki | Colin | Episode: "Fallback" |
| 2001 | Beer Money | Neal Blank | Television film |
| 2001 | Nash Bridges | Gene Bacon | Episode: "Slam Dunk" |
| 2001 | The King of Queens | Clerk | Episode: "Departure Time" |
| 2001 | The Wayne Brady Show | Various | Also writer (1 episode) |
| 2001 | The Hughleys | Mr. Babbes | Episode: "Go with the Flow" |
| 2001 | Grounded for Life | Dave | Episode: "Baby You Can't Drive My Car" |
| 2002 | Even Stevens | Shorty | Episode: "Ren-Gate" |
| 2002 | Will & Grace | Minion | Episode: "Hocus Focus" |
| 2002 | Wednesday 9:30 (8:30 Central) | Dave Henry | 2 episodes |
| 2002 | House of Mouse | Kuzco (voice) | Episode: "Ask Von Drake" |
| 2002 | Yes, Dear | Host | Episode: "Mr. Big Shot" |
| 2002 | Sabrina the Teenage Witch | Stan / Counter Guy | Episode: "Sabrina Unplugged" as Stan; Episode: "Call Me Crazy" as Counter Guy |
| 2002 | The District | Jerry Dworski | 3 episodes |
| 2003 | Birds of Prey | Cameron Anderson | Episode: "Reunion" |
| 2003 | Charmed | Stanley | Episode: "The Day the Magic Died" |
| 2003 | Less Than Perfect | Peter | Episode: "Picture Perfect Party" |
| 2003–2004 | Reno 911! | Naked Armenian | 2 episodes |
| 2004 | Starship Troopers 2: Hero of the Federation | Sgt. Ari Peck | Television film |
| 2004 | My Wife and Kids | Steve | 2 episodes |
| 2004 | Smallville | Edgar Cole | Episode: "Transference" |
| 2004 | Half & Half | Erik | Episode: "The Big Don't Go Chasing Waterfalls Episode" |
| 2004–2006 | Phil of the Future | Curtis / Vice Principal Hackett | 30 episodes, credited as JP Manoux; Also director (1 episode) |
| 2005 | Unscripted | Editor | Episode: "Episode #1.4" |
| 2005 | How I Met Your Mother | Eric | Episode: "The Limo" |
| 2006 | Scrubs | Charlie | Episode: "My Rite of Passage" |
| 2006 | Crossing Jordan | Sorenson | Episode: "Mysterious Ways" |
| 2006–2007 | Disney Channel Games | Kuzco (voice) | Television Special (week 7 and 8) |
| 2006–2008 | The Emperor's New School | Kuzco (voice) | 52 episodes |
| 2006–2009 | The Replacements | Mr. Fraley / Skateboarder (voices) | 23 episodes |
| 2007 | Random! Cartoons | Additional voices | Episode: "Bradwurst" |
| 2007 | In Case of Emergency | Marty | Episode: "The Picture" |
| 2007 | Monk | Jacob Posner | Episode: "Mr. Monk Is Up All Night" |
| 2007 | Higglytown Heroes | Bike Repair Guy (voice) | Episode: "Wayne's Cycle Recycle/Wayne's Wet Pet" |
| 2007 | Cavemen | Glen | 3 episodes |
| 2007 | Imperfect Union | Reggie | Television film |
| 2008 | My Boys | David | Episode: "Take My Work Wife... Please" |
| 2009 | Family Guy | Alan Harper (voice) | Episode: "Ocean's Three and a Half" |
| 2009–2010 | Aaron Stone | S.T.A.N. | 34 episodes Also director (1 episode) |
| 2010 | True Jackson, VP | Waiter | Episode: "True Royal" |
| 2010 | The Good Guys | Monroe | Episode: "Broken Door Theory" |
| 2010 | Svetlana | Casting Associate | Episode: "Crystal Methdown" |
| 2010 | Warehouse 13 | Lenny Malone | Episode: "Around the Bend" |
| 2011 | Raising Hope | Gary | Episode: "Everybody Flirts... Sometimes" |
| 2011 | Wilfred | Leo | 3 episodes |
| 2011 | InSecurity | Dodson | Episode: "Spies of a Certain Age" |
| 2011 | My Life as an Experiment | Guy | Television film |
| 2012 | Secrets of Eden | Detective Emmet Walker | |
| 2012 | Mudpit | Additional voices | Episode: "The Avatarts"; Also director (3 episodes) |
| 2012 | Bones | Farmer | Episode: "The Family in the Feud" |
| 2012 | NCIS: Los Angeles | Bob Wright | Episode: "Neighborhood Watch" |
| 2012 | The L.A. Complex | Jeff the Incredible | Episode: "Xs and Os" |
| 2012 | Transporter: The Series | Kagan | 2 episodes |
| 2012 | Wedding Band | Keith | Episode: "Don't Forget About Me" |
| 2012–2013 | Community | Faux-by / Dopple-deaner | 4 episodes |
| 2013 | Suburgatory | Chef Norman Neuman | Episode: "T-Ball & Sympathy" |
| 2013 | Alien Mysteries | Matthew Reed | Episode: "The Reed Family" |
| 2013 | Men at Work | Frank | Episode: "The Good, the Bad & the Milo" |
| 2013 | Big Time Rush | Mitchell V. Gold | Episode: "Big Time Invasion" |
| 2013 | Modern Family | Todd | Episode: "First Days" |
| 2013 | The League | Donald | Episode: "The Near Death Flex-perience" |
| 2014 | Hot in Cleveland | Nate | Episode: "I Just Met the Man I'm Going to Marry" |
| 2014 | Table 58 | Vice Principal Monty | Television film |
| 2014–2015 | Spun Out | Bryce McBradden | 24 episodes Also director (1 episode) |
| 2015 | The Thundermans | Mr. Hollister | Episode: "Mall Time Crooks" |
| 2016 | Good Girls Revolt | J.P. Crowley | 7 episodes |
| 2016–2017 | Veep | Congressman Clarence Clark | 8 episodes |
| 2017 | Take It from the Top | Preston | Television film |
| 2017 | The Magicians | River Watcher | Episode: "Knight of Crowns" |
| 2018 | The Librarians | Preacher/Dradok/Bartender | Episode: "And the Silver Screen" |
| 2018 | Swedish Dicks | Lou | 4 episodes |
| 2019 | Shameless | Zach | Episode: "Down Like the Titanic" |
| 2019 | Grey's Anatomy | Danny Nelstadt | Episode: "Blood and Water" |
| 2019 | Curb Your Enthusiasm | Calvin | Episode: "Insufficient Praise" |
| 2020 | 9-1-1: Lone Star | Trevor | Episode: "Monster Inside" |
| 2020 | All That | Thomas Edison | Episode: "1116" |
| 2022 | Charmed | Arnold | Episode: "Ripples" |
| 2022 | The Walls Are Watching | Banker | Television film |
| 2022–2023 | CSI: Vegas | Gene Farrow | 2 episodes |
| 2023 | White House Plumbers | Robert Mardian | Episode: "The Beverly Hills Burglary" |
| 2023 | Craft Me a Romance | Lloyd Worth | Television film |
| 2023 | Baselines | Mailman | Episode: "Episode 5" |
| 2024 | Love's Second Act | Aaron | Television film |
| 2025–2026 | Running Point | Arena Announcer | 12 episodes |
| 2026 | Scrubs | Dr. Meeko | Episode: "My First Time In A While" |

=== Video games ===
| Year | Title | Role | Notes |
|---|---|---|---|
| 1996 | Goosebumps: Escape from Horrorland | Squat | |
| 1997 | Blue Heat: The Case of the Cover Girl Murders | Victor | |
| 1997 | Redneck Rampage | Various | Motion-capture performer |
| 1998 | Redneck Rampage Rides Again | Various | Motion-capture performer |
| 1998 | Microshaft Winblows 98 | Graham | Credited as Jean-Paul Manoux, also writer |
| 2000 | The Emperor's New Groove | Kuzco | |
| 2001 | Monsters, Inc. | Additional voices | |
| 2005 | Kronk's New Groove | Kuzco | DVD game |
| 2005 | Kingdom Hearts II | Additional voices | |
| 2007 | Kingdom Hearts II: Final Mix+ | Additional voices | |
| 2012 | Sorcerers of the Magic Kingdom | Kuzco | |
| 2019 | Kingdom Hearts III | Randall Boggs | |

=== Web series ===
| Year | Title | Role | Notes |
|---|---|---|---|
| 2006 | Classroom | Pirate | Episode: "Episode #1.5" |
| 2008 | Gorgeous Tiny Chicken Machine Show | Tax Auditor | Episode: "Broken Fun" |
| 2014 | Nickelodeon Animated Shorts Program | Wizard (voice) | Episode: "Earmouse and Bottle" |
| 2018 | Oishi: Demon Hunter | Jeff Bezos | 4 episodes, unreleased |
| 2018 | Turnt | Pizza Boss | 3 episodes |
| 2020 | Fetish | Chicken Man | Episode: "Libersexusperversus" |
| 2025 | Paper Pals Comedy | Bobby | Episode: "Hotel Hold Up" |

=== Commercials ===
| Year | Brand | Role |
|---|---|---|
| 1997 | Zima | Upside-down Drinker |
| 1999 | Honda Civic | Number 22 |
| 2001 | Circuit City | Soccer Fan |
| 2001 | Cookie Crisp | Radio DJ |
| 2003 | Bud Light | Castaway |
| 2003 | Washington Mutual | Roy |
| 2004 | Miracle Whip | Referee |
| 2005 | Got Milk ? | Alien |
| 2006 | Fruit of the Loom | Green Grape |
| 2007 | Budweiser | Genie |

=== Writer ===
| Year | Title | Note |
|---|---|---|
| 1997 | Tights on a Wire | Theater play |
| 1997 | The X-Fools | Video game |
| 1998 | Microshaft Winblows 98 | Video game |
| 2001 | The Wayne Brady Show | 1 episode |

=== Theater ===
| Year | Title | Role | Notes |
|---|---|---|---|
| 1999 | Reefer Madness | Ralph Wiley | Replacement of John Kassir for the original 1998 production |
