= Pyst =

1997 video game

- Developers: Parroty Interactive; Bergman-Stallone; Entasis
- Publisher: Palladium Interactive
- Designer: Peter Bergman
- Writers: Peter Bergman; Peter Murietta; Phil Proctor
- Composers: Steven Stringer; Mike Sansonia
- Platforms: Mac OS, Windows
- Release: NA: October 30, 1996
- Genre: Adventure
- Mode: Single-player

Pyst (stylised as PYST) is an adventure computer game released in October 1996. It was created as a parody of the highly successful adventure game Myst. Pyst was written by Peter Bergman, a co-founder of the Firesign Theatre, and was published by Parroty Interactive, with Bergman, Stallone, Inc. as co-publisher. Mindscape began distributing the game on August 20, 1997. The parody features full motion video of actor John Goodman as "King Mattruss", the ruler of "Pyst Island". Versions of the game were produced for both the Windows PC and Apple Macintosh operating systems.

Parroty Interactive was a division of Palladium Interactive, whose other brands included Ultimate Family Tree and Palladium Kids. Parroty intended to create National Lampoon-esque "humorous CD-ROMs, web sites and other forms of interactive comedy". This title served as Parroty's debut game in the interactive parody space, which would be followed by games such as their Star Wars parody Star Warped.

== Development ==
The basic concept of Pyst was to show what Myst Island (from the best-selling game) would look like after four million people (that game's players) had visited and "explored". Pyst developer and comedian Peter Bergman wanted to give Myst players the ability to "experience the island in a whole new light". Palladium President Ed Bernstein wanted the game to be a "transformative work that moved way beyond Myst", in order to avoid copyright issues with Myst publisher Broderbund, on the grounds of the new game being a parody work. A spokesman from Broderbund said the company was unfazed by the project, commenting: "We've seen imitators and they usually just give us a good chuckle". Bergman discovered that the sense of comic timing he had for his live shows couldn't be replicated in the digital realm, and he had to adapt accordingly. Firesign Theatre website Firezine said that the game was illustrative of Bergman's ability to "survey America's culture and obsessions like a maniacal monitor reflecting the absurdness of it all, while casting his iconoclastic eye to read the entrails of the present coarse and our delirious future".

Bergman collaborated with David Ossman, Phil Proctor, Melinda Peterson, sound designer Ted Bonnitt and other players from his Radio Free Oz show to produce the game. In addition, he hired Mike Sansonia to create the game's music, while Ted Bonnitt directed mouth-sound-effects artist Fred Newman to record voice tracks to blend with recorded sound effects. The effect was to create a sound design with distinct, comedic character. John Goodman plays "King Mattruss", the ruler of "Pyst Island". The 2004 book Game Work: Language, Power, and Computer Game Culture noted that this was an example of the then-recent trend of famous actors starring in digital movies within games. Goodman and Bergman had worked together in radio, while Goodman also had appeared on the Proctor and Bergman Comedy Service series prior to Pyst. The game also includes an original song, "I'm Pyst", performed by Goodman and written by Bergman.

=== Release ===
Before the game's release, Bergman and the Parroty Interactive marketing department were both secretive about game-related information; Bergman said that this was unusual experience for him. The game was originally planned for release on October 15, 1996. Released for Christmas 1996, Pyst remained on the CD-ROM best-seller list through 1999, according to the Official Millennium Survival Handbook. The game was "highly successful"; in 1997 Palladium's vice president of marketing Rob Halligan said that Pyst was "tremendously successful last Christmas and continues to sell well". A Mindscape press release issued through Business Wire said the game was the "top-selling parody product of 1996", selling over 200,000 copies worldwide. There was a website extension to the game, which allowed players to further interact with the game by "download[ing] updated video and audio clips and chat[ing] with other Pyst aficionados", the game being the first product by Palladium to include dial-up access to AT&T WorldNet Service. Hal Josephson, executive producer for Pyst, said that there were few business models at the time for how to make money online. In 1998, after Parroty's acquisition by The Learning Company, Palladium founder and chief executive officer Ed Bernstein said that "it was a fun business, but not terribly lucrative".

== Plot and gameplay ==
King Mattruss (John Goodman) in a hot tub in "The Love Cabin".

Pyst Island is full of litter, most of the buildings are ruined, and graffiti reveals secret doors and solutions to puzzles that challenged players in Myst. Pyst utilizes three-dimensional graphics, animated drawings, and pre-recorded video and audio.

Gameplay is a simplified version of the playing style used for Myst. The game consists of a series of pre-rendered, interactive visuals of Pyst Island locations. With Bergman's "seal of disapproval", the concept is that the familiar Myst locations have been vandalized by millions of virtual players who have been trapped on the island, having "giv[en] up on trying to finish the damn thing", and as a result have trashed the space, while a shady entrepreneur has built a "Dorian Grey money-making scheme". Unlike in Myst there are no real puzzles to solve. The player simply explores a setting, and then moves to adjoining locations at will.

The game does not feature the Myst-style point-and-click interface. Instead, the players are shown an image on a postcard with four arrow keys, on the edges, that players click to change the image on the postcard. The player moves through the scenes clicking the lateral arrow keys; clicking the upper and lower arrow keys two postcards are shown for every scene, all featuring a special Pyst currency in a stamp, stylised as "5F".

== Critical reception ==
The game received mixed reviews. While noted for its novelty as one of the first parody video games, Pyst was seen as not living up to its full potential as a parody of ripe and timely subject matter and was criticized for lacking in gaming content, being more of an interactive story than a game.

Electric Playground praised the game for having a "cheeky attitude and an irreverence" not found in the source material. Hop on Pop: The Politics and Pleasures of Popular Culture wrote that Pyst challenges the central conceit of Myst, whereby the "untouched landscape" navigated by a "lone trailblazer" is reimagined as a popular, commercialised tourist attraction. PC Primer thought it was "side-splitting" and "light-hearted". MacGamer gave it the distinction of being the first parody video game, and deemed it a "mildly amusing, short-lived parody with no gaming component". Electric Games unfavourably compared it to an older, and in its opinion better, parody entitled Mylk due to the latter being free and having gameplay. Computer World thought that the game offered salvation to the multitude of players who remained perpetually stuck on Myst Island. The Sunday Mirror thought Goodman was "at the core of the game". The Daily Mirror thought it was a good alternative to those stumped by Myst, describing it as "not really a game but...a lot of fun". Salon said the game "cheerfully capitalizes on that frustration" of playing the mysterious and elusive Myst, and added that the "emergence of full-scale parodies" like this was a sign of the video game industry's "arid decadence".

Electronic Design called the game a "wacky parody" that reimagines the well-known island as something out of an industrial nightmare. In the Eyes of the Setting Sun deemed it "satirical", while BusinessWeek thought all of Parroty Interactive's work was "hilarious". Billboard found it to be funnier than Myst and "all-too-short". Plotting New Media Frontiers thought that the existence of parody games demonstrated that "generic conventions are well established and part of the culture associated with computer game playing", citing Pyst as a prime example. Computer Shopper said the title was "no-holds-barred" and "pulls no punches" in its odd sense of humour, and deemed it a favourable alternative to those who were annoyed by Myst's "inscrutable puzzles". CD Mag thought the game was "somewhat witty". Emil Pagliarulo of The Adrenaline Vault saw Pyst as an example of how Parroty Interactive made games that were "completely original simply by capitalizing on unoriginality".

PC Gamer said that Pyst's two main problems were that it was not funny as a parody of Myst, and that it was not so much a game than a "series of rendered slides in sequence". Giant Bomb writer Alex Navarro thought he had not enjoyed the game's humour in his youth as he had not played Myst; he retrospectively claimed that the game was "not a very good parody". K. R. Parkinson of Adventure Gamers wrote that the game "ultimately comes up lacking in its attempt to lampoon its best-selling target of derision". BrutalMoose felt the game was a good idea wrapped up in a bad execution. A reviewer from Game Revolution gave it a scathing review, deeming it "pathetic". Entertainment Weekly described it as a "pretension-busting romp through a ripe-for-puncturing cult classic", comparing it to Mad magazine's 201 Min. of a Space Idiocy parody of A Space Odyssey. PC Multimedia & Entertainment initially thought the game was a "stupid idea", but upon playing it found it to be a "very funny multimedia presentation". The Daily Pennsylvanian concluded their review by saying that while Myst sucked the player in, Pyst "just plain sucked". Andy Oldfield of The Independent thought the game was merely a "series of puns and visual gags", not a proper parody. HardcoreGaming101 felt the game only had 30 minutes of gameplay.

== Legacy ==
The game is considered by many to be the earliest parody video game and the first parody of the Myst series, but a free "homage" game entitled Mylk was created by Bart Gold using Macromedia Director and released earlier. Mylk's PC version was by Wayne Twitchell. The plot of this game involves a "dairy cow fall[ing] through a crevice to a ranch". Stories in Between: Narratives and Mediums @ Play listed Pyst, Mysty, Missed, and Mylk as four parody games based on the Myst series. The Mysterious World of Missed, or Missed, was developed by Jason Bloomberg. 100 Videogames noted the success of Myst is "best demonstrated by the amount of parodies constructed of it". Danielle Rosen of Built To Play thought the game was a predecessor to exploration video games like Gone Home and Dear Esther.

A demo of the planned sequel to Pyst, Driven (an allusion to the Myst sequel Riven), was included on CD-ROMs of later Parroty Interactive games, including the "Pyst Special Edition" re-release of the game. Driven was graphically more advanced and allowed greater movement. The full game was never released, however. Palladium Interactive was bought by The Learning Company in 1998, who proceeded to dissolve Parroty Interactive before the title was finished.
