= Brian Posehn =

American actor, musician and comedian (born 1966)

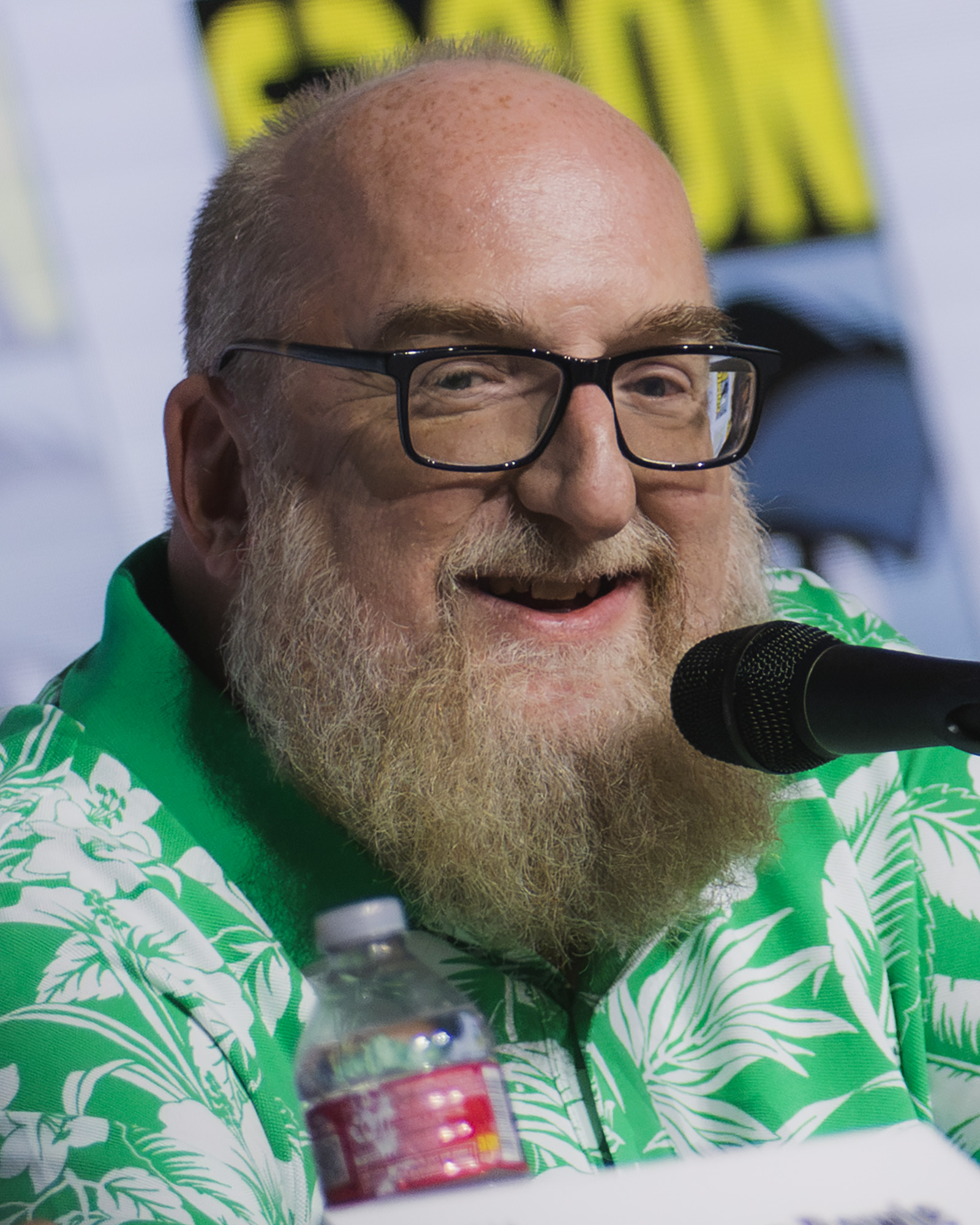
- Posehn in 2026
- Born: July 6, 1966 (age 60); Sacramento, California, U.S.
- Education: California State University, Sacramento
- Spouse: Melanie Truhett (m. 2004)
- Children: 1

Comedy career
- Years active: 1994–present
- Medium: Stand-up; television; film; music; comics
- Genres: Observational comedy; black comedy; surreal humor; insult comedy; sarcasm; satire; deadpan
- Subjects: American culture; American politics; human behavior; pop culture; current events; religion; marijuana; drug use

Brian Posehn (/poʊˈseɪn/ poh-SAYN; born July 6, 1966) is an American stand-up comedian, actor, voice actor, musician, and writer. After numerous appearances as a television guest star, he acquired his first major recurring role in HBO's Mr. Show with Bob and David (1995–1998). He is known for his roles as Jim Kuback on The WB's Mission Hill and Brian Spukowski on Comedy Central's The Sarah Silverman Program. Posehn had a recurring role on The Big Bang Theory as geologist Bert Kibbler.

As a stand-up comedian, Posehn has released four comedy albums and one standalone music album. Since 2012, he has hosted the online Dungeons & Dragons podcast Nerd Poker. He has done voice work for video games including Halo 2, FusionFall, Brütal Legend, and Minecraft: Story Mode.

Posehn received nominations for two Primetime Emmy Awards in 1998 and 1999 for Outstanding Writing for a Variety or Music Program for his work on Mr. Show with Bob and David. He was nominated along with the rest of the series' writing crew. He also received a nomination for a DVDX Award for Best Original Song in a DVD Premiere Movie in 2003 for Run Ronnie Run!.

== Background ==
Posehn was born in Sacramento and grew up there. He is of German and Irish descent. He graduated from Sonoma Valley High School in Sonoma in 1984 and attended California State University, Sacramento. He began his career after meeting Bob Odenkirk and David Cross in San Francisco; some say his career of comedy began in the San Francisco Bay Area.

== Career ==
=== Television work ===
Posehn began with guest appearances and mainly small roles in TV shows. He was in 28 episodes of Mr. Show with Bob and David (1995–1998), a sketch comedy series on HBO. In a 1996 episode of Friends, he delivered the manuscript in which Joey Tribbiani's soap opera character "Dr. Drake Ramoray" is killed. He appeared as two different characters in NewsRadio: a fan with questions for Jimmy James at a book reading (1997), and a member of Dave's a cappella group "Chock Full o' Notes" (1998). In the Seinfeld episode "The Burning" (1998), he played a patient, when Kramer caught gonorrhea. His character was instructed to demonstrate for a group of medical students how a surgeon left a sponge in him post surgery. Posehn wrote a Space Ghost: Coast to Coast episode, "Cahill" (1998), with Ben Karlin. Posehn appeared on 29 episodes of the NBC comedy series Just Shoot Me! (1999–2003). He played the voice of Jim in Mission Hill on the WB (1999–2002), and Del Swanson in 3-South on MTV (2002–2003). On an Adult Swim show, Aqua Teen Hunger Force, he voiced the Wisdom Cube in the 2003 episode "The Cubing".

Posehn performed the voice of Gibbons, a tiny man, on several episodes of the Cartoon Network's Tom Goes to the Mayor (2005–2006). He appeared in the 2005 pilot for The Showbiz Show with David Spade, in a segment called "The Nerd Perspective" giving a scathing criticism of MTV and its declining quality. He played a mortician in several episodes of Comedy Central's Reno 911!. He was featured on the 2005 documentary series The Comedians of Comedy on Comedy Central and Showtime. He was in a 2007 episode of the improv series Thank God You're Here on NBC and was a celebrity judge on the revived 1970s game show The Gong Show with Dave Attell (2008), on Comedy Central. He co-stars on The Sarah Silverman Program with Steve Agee as a gay couple that are friends of Silverman. Posehn also wrote the season three finale "Wowschwitz". He played himself in the episode "Spagett" of Tim and Eric Awesome Show, Great Job!, appeared in the Comedy Central Roast of Bob Saget, played the role of a physically disabled man (Scooter Man) in the second season's premiere episode "Slip of the Tongue" of Californication (2008), on Showtime; and played Dethklok's second manager in the Metalocalypse episode "Dethsources". Posehn wrote the episode "Fatherklok".

In 2007 he joined the first season of Human Giant, a sketch comedy series on MTV, as a writer and performer, and voiced Glen Furlblam, a mega fan of Dr. Two-Brains on the PBS Kids animated series WordGirl. In 2012 he co-wrote the fourth season of Metalocalypse. From 2013 to 2019, Posehn portrayed the recurring character Bert on The Big Bang Theory. In October 2024, it was announced he would reprise his role as Bert Kibbler in the Big Bang Theory spin-off series, Stuart Fails to Save the Universe.

=== Film work ===
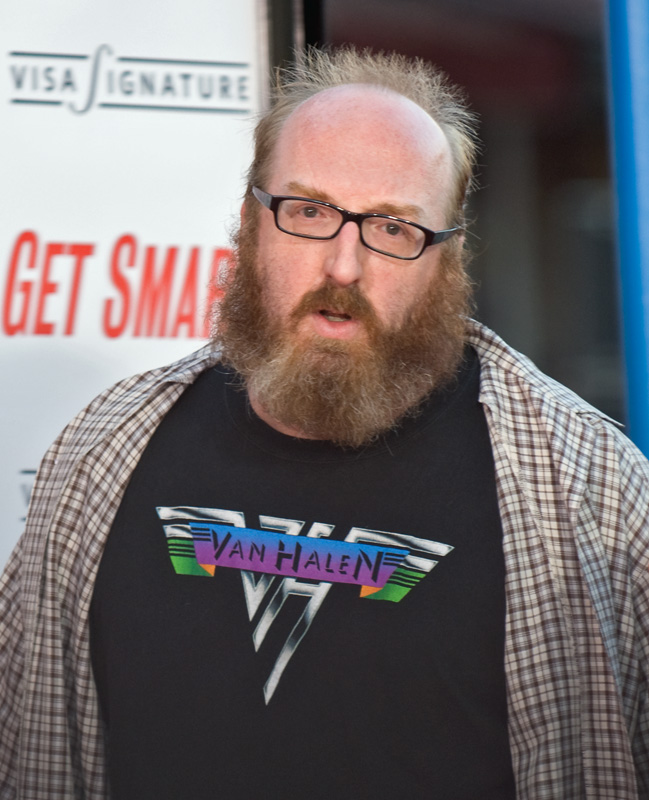
Posehn in June 2008 at the premiere of Get Smart in Westwood, Los Angeles

Film appearances from Posehn include the 2003 comedy film sequel Dumb and Dumberer: When Harry Met Lloyd, Grind, the 2005 Rob Zombie horror film The Devil's Rejects, Sleeping Dogs Lie, Fantastic Four: Rise of the Silver Surfer, and the 2007 animated feature Surf's Up, where he played Glen Maverick. Posehn appeared as himself in the 2007 documentary Super High Me starring 'marijuana comedian' Doug Benson, the 2008 documentary Nerdcore Rising about MC Frontalot and in a supporting role in Sarah Silverman: Jesus Is Magic. Posehn voices the character of Murray, a robot, in Rob Zombie's animated The Haunted World of El Superbeasto. He also voiced the character Hayashi in the English dub of Pom Poko.

=== Stand-up comedy ===
In 2002, Posehn appeared on Comedy Central Presents, followed by the release of 2005's The Comedians of Comedy, a documentary/live special chronicling a 2004 small-club comedy tour he participated in. A television series on Comedy Central of the same name followed. Posehn's debut comedy album Live In: Nerd Rage was released in 2006. He participated in the Comedy Lineup of the 2008 Bonnaroo Music and Arts Festival, which included Louis C.K., Janeane Garofalo and Zach Galifianakis. Posehn performed as part of the Rock N' Roll Comedy set with Jim Norton and Michelle Buteau. During his 2008 routine on Comedy Central Presents he referred to his Wikipedia article, which he supposedly vandalized. In 2010, Posehn released his second album Fart and Wiener Jokes. In 2011, Posehn agreed to perform at the Gathering of the Juggalos. Some of his fans criticized this decision as being "not metal". Posehn countered that "getting a paycheck is metal", and expressed respect towards the Juggalo fan culture, as well as the independent music success of Insane Clown Posse and Psychopathic Records. In 2013, Posehn released his third comedy album and first DVD, The Fartist, and in 2017 his fourth comedy album, Posehn 25x2.

=== Music ===
In 2006, Relapse Records released his first album, Live In: Nerd Rage. It includes "Metal by Numbers", a song mocking the formulaic nature of modern metal at the time of its release. The instrumental tracks feature musicians such as guitarist Scott Ian (of Anthrax), bassist Joey Vera (then of Anthrax, but also of Armored Saint and Fates Warning), drummer John Tempesta (of The Cult and White Zombie), and lead guitarist Jonathan Donais (of Shadows Fall). Posehn also appeared in the Anthrax music videos for "What Doesn't Die" and "Blood Eagle Wings". Posehn appeared on a Season 4 episode of the music talk show That Metal Show and Lamb of God's Walk With Me In Hell DVD, and performed "More Metal Then You", a song that was included on his non-musical stand-up comedy album Fart & Weiner Jokes, with "Brian Posehn's All-Star Band" on the 2010 Revolver Golden Gods Awards. Posehn appeared in The Damned Things music video for "We've Got A Situation Here". He provided backing vocals for Evile's album Five Serpent's Teeth.

In 2020, Posehn released his first music-only album, Grandpa Metal, which featured guest appearances from Brendon Small of Dethklok, Scott Ian, Corey Taylor of Slipknot and Stone Sour, Weird Al Yankovic, Phil Demmel of Machine Head, Michael Starr of Steel Panther and others. The album consists of comedy metal songs, as well as metal covers of "Take On Me" by A-Ha and "The Fox (What Does the Fox Say?)" by Ylvis.

=== Other work ===
Posehn has provided voice work for video games Brütal Legend as The Hunter and Star Warped as co-narrator Brian. Posehn has also voiced Grunts and various Marines in the 2004 video game Halo 2. Posehn appeared in the commercial "Ink Fairy" for Staples office supply store in its ad campaign featuring the "Easy Button."

In 2006, Posehn co-wrote the comic book The Last Christmas with writer Gerry Duggan, published by Image Comics (ISBN 1582406766). In April 2009 Posehn hosted the first American "Golden Gods Awards" for metal music hosted by Revolver Magazine. As part of the Marvel NOW! initiative Posehn and Gerry Duggan co-wrote the Deadpool ongoing comic series which launched in November 2012, lasting 45 issues. His run ended in April 2015. The first six issues were illustrated by Tony Moore. Since 2012, Posehn has hosted a podcast called Nerd Poker, where a group of comedians play Dungeons & Dragons. Co-hosts include comic book writer Gerry Duggan and comedian Blaine Capatch, among others. Posehn has participated in the Dungeons & Dragons campaign Force Grey: Lost City of Omu, hosted by Matthew Mercer.

== Personal life ==
Posehn and Melanie Truhett married in 2004 and they have a son. He is known for using cannabis. He quit smoking marijuana in 2011 but resumed about three years later. In April 2023, he said he "almost died" in a serious car crash in Los Angeles involving his family and a friend.

== Filmography ==
=== Film ===
Year	Title	Role	Notes
1998	The Wedding Singer	Man at Table 9	Uncredited
2000	The Independent	Fan from Casper	Uncredited
2000	Desperate but Not Serious	Auteur #2	
2002	Run Ronnie Run!	Tank	Also writer
2002	Sorority Boys	Haggard Alum	
2003	Dumb and Dumberer: When Harry Met Lloyd	Store clerk	
2003	Grind	Orville the Scraggly Guy	
2003	Brother Bear	Additional voices	
2004	Adventures in Homeschooling	Eugene Drifke	Short film
2004	Eulogy	Video Store Clerk	
2005	Sarah Silverman: Jesus Is Magic	Friend	
2005	Cake Boy	Darrel	
2005	The Devil's Rejects	Jimmy	
2005	Pom Poko	Hayashi	Voice, English dub
2006	Sleeping Dogs Lie	Randy	
2006	Ergo Proxy	Dog Cop #2	
2007	Smiley Face	Bus Driver	
2007	Undead or Alive	Ben	
2007	Surf's Up	Glen Maverick	Voice
2007	Fantastic Four: Rise of the Silver Surfer	Wedding Minister	
2008	Spy School	Grissom	
2008	Sex Drive	Carney	
2009	The Haunted World of El Superbeasto	Murray	Voice
2010	Scooby-Doo! Abracadabra-Doo	Marlon Whirlen	Voice
2011	Lloyd the Conqueror	Andy	
2012	The Five-Year Engagement	Tarquin	
2013	Knights of Badassdom	Gilberto	
2015	Hell and Back	Cleb	Voice
2015	Uncle Nick	Uncle Nick	
2017	Captain Underpants: The First Epic Movie	Mr. Rected	Voice
2019	Christmas Magic		
2020	The Last Blockbuster	Himself	

=== Television ===
Year	Title	Role	Notes
1995	Empty Nest	Painted gut guy	Episode: "Harry Weston: Man's Best Friend"
1995–1998	Mr. Show with Bob and David	Various	21 episodes; also writer
1996	Friends	Messenger	Episode: "The One Where Dr. Ramoray Dies"
1996	Party Girl	Patron #1	Episode: "Pilot"
1997, 2001	Everybody Loves Raymond	Walter / Warren	2 episodes
1997–1998	NewsRadio	Brian / Fan	2 episodes
1998	Jenny	Guest #3	Episode: "A Girl's Gotta Hang with a Celebrity"
1998	Veronica's Closet	The Maintenance Guy	Episode: "Veronica's Divorce Papers"
1998	Seinfeld	Artie	Episode: "The Burning"
1998	The Army Show	Eddie	5 episodes
1999	Maggie	Janitor	Episode: "This Is Just a Test"
1999–2002	Mission Hill	Jim Kuback	Voice, 13 episodes
1999	Jesse	Terry	Episode: "Momma Was a Rollin' Stone"
1999–2003	Just Shoot Me!	Kevin Liotta	29 episodes
2001	Clerks: The Animated Series	Various voices	3 episodes
2001	Becker	George	Episode: "The Ugly Truth"
2002	Comedy Central Presents	Himself	Comedy special
2002–2007	Kim Possible	Cousin Larry	Voice, 5 episodes
2002–2003	3-South	Del	13 episodes
2003	Ozzy & Drix	Sylvian Fisher	Voice, episode: "Growth"
2003	Crank Yankers	Clay	Voice, episode: "2.19"
2003	Aqua Teen Hunger Force	The Real Wisdom Cube	Voice, episode: "The Cubing"
2003–2004	The Man Show	—N/a	Writer and consulting producer
2004	Method & Red	Guard	Episode: "Pilot"
2004	Dave the Barbarian	Knuckles the Silly Piggy, Kid	Voice, episode: "The Princess and the Peabrain"
2004–2005	The Bernie Mac Show	David	2 episodes
2005	American Dad!	Dan Vebber	Voice, episode: "All About Steve"
2005	Cheap Seats: Without Ron Parker	Craig Bogie	Episode: "Kids Putt-Putt/Double Dutch"
2005–2006	Tom Goes to the Mayor	Gibbons	Voice, 4 episodes
2006	Re-Animated	Crocco	Voice, television film
2006–2007	Reno 911!	Stevie the Coroner	3 episodes
2007, 2008	Tim and Eric Awesome Show, Great Job!	Gibbons, self	Voice, 2 episodes
2007–2010	The Sarah Silverman Program	Brian Spukowski	32 episodes
2007–2008	Human Giant	Various characters	5 episodes; also consultant writer
2007–2008	Out of Jimmy's Head	Crocco	Voice, 18 episodes
2008–2009	WordGirl	Glen Furlblam	Voice, 2 episodes
2008	The Mighty B!	Ride Guy	Voice, episode: "So Happy Together/Sweet Sixteenth"
2008	Transformers: Animated	Nino Sexton/Nanosec	Voice, 2 episodes
2008–2012	Metalocalypse	Melward Fjordslorn	Voice, episode: "Dethsources"; also writer
2008	Californication	Scooter Man	Episode: "Slip of the Tongue"
2008	Comedy Central Presents: 2008 Breakout Comedians	Himself	Comedy special
2010	Adventure Time	Business Man #1	Voice, episode: "Business Time"
2010	The Penguins of Madagascar	Duane	Voice, episode: "Stop Bugging Me/Field Tripped"
2010–2011	Sym-Bionic Titan	Octus/Newton	Voice, 19 episodes
2010	The Suite Life on Deck	Dr. Cork	Episode: "Frozen"
2010–2011	Nick Swardson's Pretend Time	—N/a	Writer
2011	Bob's Burgers	Choo-Choo	Voice, episode: "Spaghetti Western and Meatballs"
2012	Holliston	Clerk	Episode: "Skunked"
2012	Conan	Audience member	Episode: "Never Bring a Knife to a Hot Dog Eating Contest"
2012	Guys with Kids	Victor	3 episodes
2012	Motorcity	Oracle	Voice, episode: "Ride of the Fantasy Vans"
2013	Newsreaders	Ames MacKenzie	Episode: "Auto Erotic"
2012–2013	Anger Management	Brian	Episode: "Charlie and Kate Start a Sex Study"; also writer
2013–2019	The Big Bang Theory	Bert Kibbler	Recurring role; 15 episodes
2014–2016	Uncle Grandpa	Charlie Burgers	Voice, 3 episodes
2014–2015	New Girl	Biology Teacher	Recurring role, 5 episodes
2014	Community	Bixel	Episode: "App Development and Condiments"
2014–2018	Steven Universe	Sour Cream, Person at Dance, Zombie	Voice, 10 episodes
2015	Penn Zero: Part-Time Hero	Beach Ball Grandpappy	Voice, episode: "Balls!"
2015	Star vs. the Forces of Evil	Lobster Claws	Voice, 2 episodes
2015	W/ Bob & David	Various	4 episodes
2016	Lady Dynamite	Sebastian	Episode: "Pilot"
2016	You're the Worst	Himself	Episode: "The Inherent, Unsullied Qualitative Value of Anything"
2017	The Simpsons	Dumlee	Voice, episode: "A Father's Watch"
2017	Billy Dilley's Super-Duper Subterranean Summer	Gorkager	Voice, 5 episodes
2017	Ginger Snaps	Fingers	Voice, 10 episodes
2017	Mighty Magiswords	Tracy / Logan	Voice, episode: "Bureaucrophobia"
2017	The Adventures of Puss in Boots	Tim	Voice, episode: "The Iceman Meleth"
2017–2018	Mr Student Body President	Lyle	5 episodes
2018	Teachers	Zeke	Episode: "Hello, Goodbye"
2018	Camp Confessions		
2019	Deadly Class	Shandy	5 episodes
2019	Rise of the Teenage Mutant Ninja Turtles	—N/a	Writer; episode: "Pizza Pit"
2019	The Mandalorian	Speeder pilot	Episode: "Chapter 1"
2020	DreamWorks Dragons: Rescue Riders	Gludge	Voice, episode: "Belly Flop"
2020	Steven Universe Future	Sour Cream	Voice, episode: "Bismuth Casual"
2020	Crank Yankers	Himself	Voice, episode: "Posehn, Nick Kroll & David Alan Grier"
2020	Top Secret Videos	Co-host	
2020	The Neighborhood	Clem	Episode: "Welcome to the Road Trip"
2021	Nailed It!	Himself	Episode: "I've Failed and I Can't Get Up!"
2024	Lopez vs Lopez	Nicholas	Episode: "Lopez vs Santa"
2026-present	Stuart Fails to Save the Universe	Bert Kibbler	Main role

=== Music videos ===
Year	Artist	Song	Notes
2011	Red Fang	"Wires"	Store Clerk
2016	Anthrax	"Blood Eagle Wings"	Tormentor – The Butcher
2017	Mastodon	"Show Yourself"	Street Vendor
2026	Electric Callboy	"Let The Good Times Roll"	Pedestrian

=== Video games ===
Year	Title	Role
1994	Off-World Interceptor	Comedy Voiceover
1997	Star Warped	Brian
2004	Halo 2	Grunt
2009	Cartoon Network Universe: FusionFall	Octus
2009	Brütal Legend	Hunter
2015	Minecraft: Story Mode	Axel
2026	Grand Theft Auto VI	Big Fan Brian

=== Podcasts ===
Year	Title	Role
2012–present	Nerd Poker	Himself/Amarth Amon/Dag Darkomen/Bodhi/Dargthur Sturry

== Discography ==
- Live In: Nerd Rage (2006) – stand-up comedy
- Fart and Wiener Jokes (2010) – stand-up comedy
- The Fartist (2013) – stand-up comedy
- Posehn 25x2 (2017) – stand-up comedy
- Grandpa Metal (2020) – as Posehn, music only

== Accolades ==
Posehn has been nominated for two Primetime Emmys and a DVDX Award. His first Primetime Emmy nomination in 1998 for Outstanding Writing for a Variety or Music Program was for writing Mr. Show with Bob and David. Crew members Scott Aukerman, Jerry Collins, David Cross, Jay Johnston, Bob Odenkirk, Bill Odenkirk, B. J. Porter, and Dino Stamatopoulos were also nominated for the award. The television series' writing staff including Posehn, received another nomination in the same category in 1999. Posehn shared the nomination with Mike Stoyanov, Paul F. Tompkins, Mike Upchurch, and the staff from the 1998.

For working on Run Ronnie Run!, Posehn was nominated at the 2003 DVD Exclusive Awards for Best Original Song in a DVD Premiere Movie for "The Golden Rule Song" along with Jack Black (with the Joey Cheesy Reunion Band) and fellow lyricists Cross, Bob Odenkirk, Aukerman, Porter, and Eban Schletter.

== Bibliography ==
=== Image Comics ===
- The Last Christmas (tpb, 176 pages, 2006, ISBN 978-1582406763)
- Rifters
  - Volume 1 (collects issues #1-6) (tpb, 168 pages, 2025, ISBN 978-1534387607)

=== Marvel Comics ===
- Deadpool:
  - Volume 1: Dead Presidents (collects Deadpool (Marvel Now!) vol. 3 #1–6, 154 pages; Marvel Comics, softcover; May 2013)
  - Volume 2: Soul Hunter (collects Deadpool (Marvel Now!) vol. 3 #7–12, 137 pages; Marvel Comics, softcover; August 2013)
  - Volume 3: The Good, the Bad and the Ugly (collects Deadpool (Marvel Now!) vol. 3 #13–19, 160 pages; Marvel Comics, softcover; January 2014)
  - Volume 4: Deadpool vs. S.H.I.E.L.D. (collects Deadpool (Marvel Now!) vol. 3 #20–25, 136 pages; Marvel Comics, softcover; June 2014)
  - Volume 5: The Wedding of Deadpool (collects Deadpool (Marvel Now!) vol. 3 #26–28 and Deadpool Annual #1, 168 pages; Marvel Comics, softcover; August 2014)
  - Volume 6: Original Sin (collects Deadpool (Marvel Now!) vol. 3 #29–34, 144 pages; Marvel Comics, softcover; December 2014)
  - Volume 7: Axis (collects Deadpool (Marvel Now!) vol. 3 #35–40, 136 pages; Marvel Comics, softcover; March 2015)
  - Volume 8: All Good Things (collects Deadpool (Marvel Now!) vol. 3 #41–44, #250, 176 pages; Marvel Comics, softcover; June 2015)
  - Dracula's Gauntlet (collects Deadpool: Dracula's Gauntlet (Marvel Now!) vol. 1 #1–7, 200 pages; Marvel Comics, softcover; November 2014)
