= Brian Volk-Weiss filmography and discography =

The filmography and discography of Brian Volk-Weiss consists of numerous stand-up specials, comedy albums, films, and television shows. Volk-Weiss has largely acted as a producer or executive producer on these projects in his role as CEO of the production and distribution company, Comedy Dynamics. He has also directed select stand-up specials and television episodes, including those for his own Netflix series, The Toys That Made Us. Over the course of his career, Volk-Weiss has served as a producer for comedy albums and stand-up specials for many comedians, including Jim Gaffigan, Kevin Hart, Ali Wong, Tom Segura, Marc Maron, Doug Stanhope, D.L. Hughley, Bob Saget, Tiffany Haddish, Bill Burr, Brian Posehn, Mike Birbiglia, Kathleen Madigan, and numerous others. Two comedy albums he has produced (Louis C.K.: Live at Madison Square Garden and Dave Chappelle's The Age of Spin & Deep in the Heart of Texas) have gone on to win the Grammy Award for Best Comedy Album.

== Filmography ==
=== Director ===
List of director credits showing title and year released
| Year | Title | Notes |
|---|---|---|
| 2015–2022 | Coming To The Stage | Hulu (2015–17; segment director for 5 episodes); Pluto TV (2018–present); Comedy Dynamics Network (2019–present; director of episode 8.1) |
| 2017– present | The Toys That Made Us | Netflix; directed 4 episodes, 2 episodes in pre-production |
| 2017 | Lavell Crawford: Home for the Holidays | Showtime stand-up special |
| 2017 | U.S. Grant: American Warrior | History TV documentary film |
| 2018 | Discontinued | Back-door television pilot for The CW |
| 2018 | Backseat Comics | Microsoft Mixer; directed 12 episodes |
| 2018 | Kevin Smith: Silent But Deadly | Showtime stand-up special |
| 2018 | Jimmie JJ Walker & Michael Winslow: We Are Still Here | Comedy Dynamics stand-up special |
| 2018 | Henry Rollins: Keep Talking, Pal | Showtime stand-up special |
| 2018 | Dennis Miller: Fake News, Real Jokes | Comedy Dynamics stand-up special |
| 2018 | Steve Lemme & Kevin Heffernan: The Potential Farewell Tour | Comedy Dynamics stand-up special |
| 2019 | Joel McHale: Live from Pyongyang | Comedy Dynamics stand-up special; completed |
| 2019 | Howie Mandel Presents: Howie Mandel at the Howie Mandel Comedy Club | Showtime stand-up special |
| 2019 | Steve Treviño: 'Til Death | Comedy Dynamics stand-up special |
| 2019 | Bryan Callen: Complicated Apes | Comedy Dynamics stand-up special |
| 2019 | Chris Porter: A Man from Kansas | Comedy Dynamics stand-up special |
| 2019 | Marina Franklin: Single Black Female | Comedy Dynamics stand-up special |
| 2019 | Lavell Crawford: New Look, Same Funny! | Showtime stand-up special |
| 2019 | Mike E. Winfield: Stepman | Amazon stand-up special |
| 2019 | Alice Wetterlund: My Mama Is a Human and So Am I | Amazon stand-up special |
| 2019 | #IMomSoHard Live | Amazon stand-up special |
| 2019 | Gary Owen: #DoinWhatIDo | Showtime stand-up special |
| 2019 | Matt Besser: Pot Humor | Comedy Dynamics stand-up special |
| 2019 | Arsenio Hall: Smart and Classy | Netflix stand-up special |
| 2019 | Preacher Lawson: Get To Know Me | BET+ stand-up special |
| 2019 | Eddie Griffin: E-Niggma | Showtime stand-up special |
| 2019 | John Crist: I Ain't Prayin' for That | Netflix stand-up special; completed |
| 2019–2021 | The Movies That Made Us | Netflix series; directed all 16 episodes |
| 2020 | Maria Bamford: Weakness is the Brand | Comedy Dynamics stand-up special |
| 2020 | Larry the Cable Guy: Remain Seated | Comedy Dynamics stand-up special |
| 2020 | Dan Cummins: Get Outta Here; Devil! | Comedy Dynamics stand-up special |
| 2020 | Jesus Trejo: Stay At Home Son | Showtime stand-up special |
| 2020 | Gina Brillon: The Floor is Lava | Amazon stand-up special |
| 2020 | Claudia Oshry: Disgraced Queen | Comedy Dynamics stand-up special |
| 2020 | Sebastian Maniscalco presents Pat McGann: When's Mom Gonna Be Home | TV special |
| 2020 | All The Way Black | BET+ series; directed 3 episodes |
| 2020–2023 | A Toy Store Near You | Nacelle Company docuseries; directed 25 episodes |
| 2021 | Dave Helem: DJ, the Chicago Kid | TV special |
| 2021 | Ester Steinberg: Burning Bush | TV special |
| 2021 | Daniel Webb: Hoe's Parade Live at the Rose Bowl | TV special |
| 2021 | Erica Rhodes: La Vie en Rhodes | TV special |
| 2021 | Lavell Crawford: The Comedy Vaccine | TV movie |
| 2021 | The Center Seat: 55 Years of Star Trek | TV series documentary; directed all 11 episodes |
| 2021 | Gary Owen: Black Famous | TV special |
| 2021 - 2023 | Behind the Attraction | Disney+ docuseries; directed all 10 episodes |
| 2022 | Cocoa Brown: Famous Enough | TV special |
| 2022 | Helen Hong: Well Hong | TV special |
| 2022 | Jon Crist: What Are We Doing | TV special |
| 2022 | Bill Bellamy: I Want My Life Back | TV special |
| 2022 | Josh Gondelman: People Pleaser | TV special |
| 2022 | Jackie Fabulous: Menoplause | TV special |
| 2022 | Steven Michael Quezada: The New Mexican | TV special |
| 2022 | Miz Cracker: Here I Stand | TV special |
| 2022 | Katrina Davis: Figuring It Out | TV special |
| 2022 | Maija DiGiorgio: Maija! Maija! Maija! | TV special |
| 2022 | Kellen Erskine: Zoomed Out | TV special |
| 2022–present | Icons Unearthed | Vice TV TV series, 27 episodes: Season 1: Star Wars (2022); Season 2: The Simpsons (2022); Season 3: Fast & Furious (2023); Season 4: Marvel (2023); Season 5: James Bond (2023); Season 6: Batman (2024); Season 7: The Lord of the Rings (2024); Season 8: Spider-Man (2024); Season 9: Harry Potter (2024); Season 10: Tom Cruise (2024) |
| 2023 | Discontinued | Maximum Effort TV series |
| 2023 | Peppermint: So-SIGH-ety Effects | TV special |
| 2023 | Lavell Crawford: THEE Lavell Crawford | TV special |
| 2023 | Darienne Lake: Altered Boy | TV special |
| 2023 | Ginger Minj: Bless Your Heart | TV special |
| 2023 | Bebe Zahara Benet: Africa Is Not a Country | TV special |
| 2023 | Jinkx Monsoon: Red Head Redemption | TV special |
| 2023 | Zarna Garg: One in a Billion | TV special |
| 2023 | Monét X Change: Fist of Glory | TV special |
| 2023 | Hank Chen: I'm Not Supposed To Be Here | TV special |
| 2023 | Jose Velasquez Hoozay: The Salvadoran | TV special |
| 2023 | Subhah Agarwal: Airport Pigeon | TV special |
| 2023 | Kevin James Thornton: Be Yourself | TV special |
| 2023 | Malik Bazille: Who's Ya Homegirl | TV special |
| 2024 | Up For Auction | The CW TV series |
| 2024 | Kim McVicar: Female Comedian | TV special |
| 2024 | Cara Connors: Straight For Pay | TV special |
| 2024 | Rachel Scanlon: Gay Fantasy | TV special |
| 2024 | Sarah Hester Ross: Don't Mess with A Redhead | TV special |
| 2024 | Edgar Rivera: Inbelievable | TV special |
| 2024 | Samantha Ruddy: Baseball Mom | TV special |
| 2024 | Billy Corgan's Adventures in Carnyland | The CW TV series |
| 2024 | Billy Sorrells: Toxic AF | TV special |
| 2024 | Lavell Crawford: I Could Eat Part 1 | Post-production; TV special |
| 2024 | Untitled Paul Reiser Special | Post-production; TV special |
| TBA | Biker Mice from Mars | Pre-production; TV series |
| TBA | Robo Force: The Animated Series | Pre-production; TV series |

=== Producer ===
==== Film ====
| Year | Title | Role | Notes |
|---|---|---|---|
| 1999 | Spiral | Producer | Short Film |
| 2000 | Cast Away | Production assistant | Uncredited |
| 2002 | The Gray in Between | Producer | |
| 2003 | 8 Guys | Producer | Short film |
| 2006 | Employee of the Month | Producer | |
| 2007 | Good Luck Chuck | Producer | |
| 2007 | Alpha Mail | Executive Producer | |
| 2008 | My Best Friend's Girl | Producer | |
| 2012 | That Guy...Who Was In That Thing | Executive producer | Documentary |
| 2014 | Are You Joking? | Executive in Charge | Video-on-demand |
| 2015 | Bill Hicks: Reflections | Executive producer | Documentary short |
| 2015 | Adventures in Comedy | Executive producer | Documentary |
| 2015 | That Gal...Who Was in That Thing: That Guy 2 | Executive producer | Documentary |
| 2016 | Sam Kinison: The Scream Continues | Executive producer | Documentary |
| 2016 | 8989 Redstone | Producer | |
| 2016 | Chee and T | Executive producer | Comedy Dynamics Network |
| 2016 | Ear Buds: The Podcasting Documentary | Executive producer | Documentary, Comedy Dynamics Network |
| 2017 | Bear With Us | Executive producer | Comedy Dynamics Network |
| 2017 | Grass | Executive producer | Comedy Dynamics Network |
| 2017 | Waiting on Mary | Executive producer | Comedy Dynamics Network |
| 2017 | The Mix | Executive producer | Comedy Dynamics Network |
| 2017 | (Romance) in the Digital Age | Executive producer | Comedy Dynamics Network |
| 2017 | Doug Stanhope's The Unbookables | Executive producer | Documentary, Comedy Dynamics Network |
| 2018 | Poop Talk | Executive producer | Documentary, Comedy Dynamics Network |
| 2018 | Game On | Executive producer | Comedy Dynamics Network |
| 2018 | King Cnut | Executive producer | Documentary, Comedy Dynamics Network |
| 2018 | Fury of the Fist and the Golden Fleece | Executive producer | Comedy Dynamics Network |
| 2018 | Out on Stage | Executive producer | Comedy Dynamics Network |
| 2019 | Ruta Madre | Executive producer | Comedy Dynamics Network |
| 2019 | The Social Ones | Executive producer | Comedy Dynamics Network |
| 2019 | Lost Holiday | Executive producer | Comedy Dynamics Network |
| 2019 | Bruce | Executive producer | Comedy Dynamics Network |
| 2019 | Eye of the Beholder: The Art of Dungeons & Dragons | Executive producer | Documentary, Comedy Dynamics Network |
| 2019 | 1/2 New Year | Executive producer | Comedy Dynamics Network |
| 2020 | Seven Short Films About (Our) Marriage | Producer | - |
| 2020 | Never Be Done: The Richard Glen Lett Story | Producer | Documentary |
| 2020 | Blunderpuss | Producer | - |
| 2020 | Mentally Al | Producer | - |
| 2020 | Eddie Pence's (Un)Special Comedy Special | Producer | - |
| 2020 | Brash Boys Club | Producer | - |
| 2020 | Antarctica | Producer | - |
| 2020 | Brian Aylward: Big in Asia | Producer | Comedy Dynamics stand-up special |
| 2022 | The Beanie Bubble | Producer | Documentary |
| 2023 | Small Town Strong | Executive Producer | Documentary |
| TBA | Igniting the Spark, The Story of Magic: The Gathering | Executive producer | In Production; Documentary |

==== Television ====
| Year | Title | Role | Notes |
|---|---|---|---|
| 2004 | Humor Me | Producer | Sony TV pilot |
| 2005 | Cooked | Producer | Sony TV pilot |
| 2006 | U.S. of Ant | Producer | Logo |
| 2006 | Tourgasm | Producer | HBO docuseries |
| 2006 | The Best Damn Sports Show Period 1000th Episode | Producer | TV series |
| 2006 | Comedy Central Presents | Executive producer | S10.E24 - Kyle Cease |
| 2007 | The Next Best Thing: Who Is the Greatest Celebrity Impersonator? | Producer | ABC |
| 2007–2008 | Frank TV | Producer | TBS |
| 2010 | Pretty Wild | Executive producer | E! |
| 2011 | True Grime: Crime Scene Clean Up | Executive producer | Investigation Discovery |
| 2012 | Forever Jones Holiday | Executive producer | Bounce TV movie |
| 2012–2013 | Stevie TV | Executive producer | VH1 |
| 2013 | We're the Fugawis | Executive in charge of production | History |
| 2013 | Forever Jones | Executive producer | Bounce |
| 2014 | Off the Chain | Executive producer | Bounce |
| 2014 | Nathan East: For The Record | Executive producer | Hulu TV movie documentary |
| 2014–2015 | We Got Next | Executive producer | BET |
| 2015 | Uncontrolled Comedy | Executive producer | BET |
| 2015 | It Takes a Sister | Executive producer | Oxygen |
| 2015–present | Coming To The Stage | Executive producer, director | Hulu (2015–17); Pluto TV (2018); Comedy Dynamics Network (2019–present) |
| 2016 | Join or Die with Craig Ferguson | Executive producer | History |
| 2016 | Wild 'N On Tour | Executive producer | MTV2 |
| 2016 | 50 Years of Star Trek | Executive producer | History TV movie documentary |
| 2017 | Animal Nation with Anthony Anderson | Executive producer | Animal Planet |
| 2017 | More to Come: A Tonight Show Documentary | Executive producer | Hulu TV movie documentary |
| 2017 | U.S. Grant: American Warrior | Executive producer, director | History TV movie |
| 2017 | There's... Johnny! | Executive producer | Hulu |
| 2017 | Spooning...With Zac Efron | Executive producer | MTV |
| 2017–2019 | The Toys That Made Us | Creator, executive producer, director | Netflix; directed 4 episodes |
| 2018 | Out On Stage | Executive producer | Dekkoo series |
| 2018 | Backseat Comics | Executive producer, director | Microsoft Mixer, directed 12 episodes |
| 2019 | Mad About You | Executive producer | Spectrum Originals; revival of series from 1992 to 1999 |
| 2019 | Kevin Hart's Guide to Black History | Executive producer | Netflix TV movie |
| 2019 | Hobo Fabulous | Executive producer | Comedy Dynamics Network limited series |
| 2019 | Iliza Shlesinger: Over & Over | Executive producer | Comedy Dynamics Network TV documentary |
| 2019 | The Movies That Made Us | Creator, executive producer, director | Netflix series |
| 2019 | That Guy... Who Was In That Thing 3: Trek Stars | Executive producer | TV documentary |
| 2020 | Grant | Executive producer | History documentary miniseries |
| 2020 | Kim McVicar: Please Notice Me | Producer | TV special |
| 2020 | Jay Mohr: American Treasure | Producer | TV special |
| 2020 | Jim Gaffigan: The Pale Tourist | Executive producer | TV series |
| 2020 | Sebastian Maniscalco presents Pat McGann: When's Mom Gonna Be Home | Executive producer | TV special |
| 2020 | Hannibal Thompson: Out of Control | Producer | TV special |
| 2020 | 9/11: The Pentagon | Executive producer | TV movie documentary |
| 2020 | Nicole Burch: Never Been Kissed | Producer | TV movie |
| 2020 | All The Way Black | Executive producer, director | BET+ series |
| 2020 | Natalie Palamides: Nate - A One Man Show | Producer | TV special |
| 2020 - 2022 | Down to Earth with Zac Efron | Executive producer | Netflix docuseries |
| 2020 - 2022 | A Toy Store Near You | Creator, executive producer, director | Nacelle Company docuseries |
| 2021 | Maz Jobrani: Pandemic Warrior | Executive producer | TV special |
| 2021 | Chris Gethard: Half My Life | Producer | TV special |
| 2021 | Michael Gelbart: All New Smash Hits | Producer | TV special |
| 2021 | Candy and Smiley | Producer | TV special documentary |
| 2021 | Dave Helem: DJ, the Chicago Kid | Executive producer | TV special |
| 2021 | Ester Steinberg: Burning Bush | Executive producer | TV special |
| 2021 | Daniel Webb: Hoe's Parade Live at the Rose Bowl | Executive producer | TV special |
| 2021 | Erica Rhodes: La Vie en Rhodes | Executive producer | TV special |
| 2021 | Natasha Pearl Hansen: I Was Supposed to Get Married Today | Executive producer | TV special |
| 2021 | Harmony McElligott: The Struggle Continues | Executive producer | TV special |
| 2021 | Jared and Robert: A Couple of Characters | Executive producer | TV special |
| 2021 | Lavell Crawford: The Comedy Vaccine | Executive producer | TV special |
| 2021 | Rick Overton's Set List | Producer | TV special |
| 2021 | Butch Bradley: From Las Vegas | Producer | TV special |
| 2021 | Lance Woods: Undeniable | Executive producer | TV special |
| 2021 | Pete Lee: Tall, Dark and Pleasant | Producer | TV special |
| 2021 | Pedja Bajovic: The Balkan Brian | Producer | TV special |
| 2021 | Erik Terrell: Live at the Helium Comedy Club | Producer | TV special |
| 2021 | Ryan James: I'm Fine | Producer | TV special |
| 2021 | Sam Tallent: Waiting for Death to Claim Us | Producer | TV special |
| 2021 | Fatimah Taliah: Nice to Meet Me | Producer | TV special |
| 2021 | Phillip Kopczynski: Live at Spokane Comedy Club | Producer | TV special |
| 2021 | Jay Nog: Something from Nothing | Producer | TV special |
| 2021 | The Movies That Made Us | Executive producer | TV series documentary |
| 2021 | Christian Finnegan: Show Your Work | Producer | TV special |
| 2021 | Jim Gaffigan: Comedy Monster | Executive producer | TV special |
| 2021 | Gary Owen: Black Famous | Executive producer | TV special |
| 2021 - 2022 | The Center Seat: 55 Years of Star Trek | Executive producer | TV series documentary |
| 2021 - 2023 | Behind the Attraction | Executive Producer | TV series documentary |
| 2022 | Eddie Izzard: Wunderbar | Producer | TV special |
| 2022 | Cocoa Brown: Famous Enough | Executive producer | TV special |
| 2022 | Kim McVicar: Tap Dancing on My Mother's Grave | Producer | TV special |
| 2022 | Katt Williams: World War III | Executive Producer | TV special |
| 2022 | Helen Hong: Well Hong | Executive Producer | TV special |
| 2022 | John Crist: What Are We Doing | Executive Producer | TV special |
| 2022 | Kim McVicar: Tap Dancing on My Mother's Grave | Producer | TV special |
| 2022 | Bill Bellamy: I Want My Life Back | Executive Producer | TV special |
| 2022 | Josh Gondelman: People Pleaser | Executive Producer | TV special |
| 2022 | Jackie Fabulous: Menoplause | Executive Producer | TV special |
| 2022 | Steven Michael Quezada: The New Mexican | Executive Producer | TV special |
| 2022 | Andrew Schulz: Infamous | Executive Producer | TV special |
| 2022 | Miz Cracker: Here I Stand | Executive Producer | TV special |
| 2022 | Katrina Davis: Figuring It Out | Executive Producer | TV special |
| 2022 | Maija DiGiorgio: Maija! Maija! Maija! | Executive Producer | TV special |
| 2022 | Kellen Erskine: Zoomed Out | Executive Producer | TV special |
| 2022 | Steve Byrne: The Last Late Night | Executive Producer | TV special |
| 2022 | Tom Papa: What a Day! | Executive Producer | TV special |
| 2022 | Earthquake: (Practice) The Secret Files of Earthquake | Executive Producer | TV special |
| 2023 | Discontinued | Executive Producer | TV series |
| 2023 | Jim Jeffries: High n'Dry | Executive Producer | TV special |
| 2023 | Peppermint: So-SIGH-ety Effects | Executive Producer | TV special |
| 2023 | Lavell Crawford: THEE Lavell Crawford | Executive Producer | TV special |
| 2023 | Darienne Lake: Altered Boy | Executive Producer | TV special |
| 2023 | Ginger Minj: Bless Your Heart | Executive Producer | TV special |
| 2023 | Bebe Zahara Benet: Africa Is Not a Country | Executive Producer | TV special |
| 2023 | Jimmy O. Yang: Guess How Much? | Executive Producer | TV special |
| 2023 | Jinkx Monsoon: Red Head Redemption | Executive Producer | TV special |
| 2023 | Zarna Garg: One in a Billion | Executive Producer | TV special |
| 2023 | Monét X Change: Fist of Glory | Executive Producer | TV special |
| 2023 | Jim Gaffigan: Dark Pale | Executive Producer | TV special |
| 2023 | Bill Engvall: Here's Your Sign It's Finally Time It's My Last Show | Executive Producer | TV special |
| 2023 | Hank Chen: I'm Not Supposed To Be Here | Executive Producer | TV special |
| 2023 | Jose Velasquez Hoozay: The Salvadoran | Producer | TV special |
| 2023 | Laurie Kilmartin: Cis Woke Grief Slut | Producer | TV special |
| 2023 | Subhah Agarwal: Airport Pigeon | Producer | TV special |
| 2023 | Leah Rudick: Spiraling | Executive Producer | TV special |
| 2023 | Malik Bazille: Who's Ya Homegirl | Executive Producer | TV special |
| 2023 | Maria Bamford: Local Act | Executive Producer | TV special |
| 2022–present | Icons Unearthed | Executive Producer | TV series |
| 2024 | Up For Auction | Executive Producer | The CW TV series |
| 2024 | Kim McVicar: Female Comedian | Executive Producer | TV special |
| 2024 | Mary Basmadjian: Funny Armenian Girl | Executive Producer | TV special |
| 2024 | Cara Connors: Straight For Pay | Executive Producer | TV special |
| 2024 | Nicole Burch: Mama Drama | Executive Producer | TV special |
| 2024 | Big Mickey: Don't Be Confused | Executive Producer | TV special |
| 2024 | Sierra Katow: Funt | Executive Producer | TV special |
| 2024 | Sarah Hester Ross: Don't Mess With A Redhead | Executive Producer | TV special |
| 2024 | Edgar Rivera: Inbelievable | Executive Producer | TV special |
| 2024 | Billy Corgan's Adventures In Carnyland | Executive Producer | The CW TV series |
| 2024 | Samantha Ruddy: Baseball Mom | Executive Producer | TV special |
| 2024 | Thirst with Shay Mitchell | Executive Producer | Max TV series |
| 2024 | Rachel Scanlon: Gay Fantasy | Executive Producer | TV special |
| 2024 | Myka Fox: My Joke, My Choice | Producer | TV special |
| 2024 | Nick Alexander Presents Nick Alexander | Producer | TV special |
| 2024 | Billy Sorrells: Toxic AF | Executive Producer | Post-production; TV special |
| 2024 | Lina Green: Daddy Issues, Death, and Dildos | Producer | Completed; TV special |
| 2024 | Ed Hill: Stupid Ed | Producer | Completed; TV special |
| 2024 | Tuesday's Trash | Producer | Completed; TV special |
| 2024 | Christine Hurley: Post-Vasectomy | Producer | Completed; TV special |
| 2024 | Lavell Crawford: I Could Eat Part 1 | Executive Producer | Post-production; TV special |
| 2024 | Ebony Moore: The Strawberry Mansion | Executive Producer | TV special |
| 2024 | Tony Rock: Rock the World | Executive Producer | TV special |
| 2024 | Kylie Brakeman: Linda Hollywood's Big Night | Executive Producer | TV special |
| 2024 | Ahmed Ahmed: It Only Takes One of Us | Producer | TV special |
| TBA | Biker Mice from Mars | Executive Producer | Pre-production; TV series |
| TBA | Robo Force: The Animated | Executive Producer | Pre-production: TV series |
| TBA | Jon Dorenbos: Life Is Magic | Executive Producer | TV special |
| TBA | Untitled Paul Reiser Special | Executive Producer | TV special |
| TBA | Untitled Tom Papa Special | Executive Producer | TV special |

=== Stand-up specials ===
| Year | Artist | Title | Role | Notes |
|---|---|---|---|---|
| 2004 | Yakov Smirnoff | Jokes from the Folks | Producer | |
| 2004 | National Lampoon Live | The International Show | Executive producer | |
| 2004 | National Lampoon Live | New Faces - Volume 1 | Executive producer | |
| 2004 | National Lampoon Live | New Faces - Volume 2 | Executive producer | |
| 2004 | National Lampoon Live | Down and Dirty | Executive producer | |
| 2005 | Alonzo Bodden | Tall, Dark, and Funny | Producer | |
| 2005 | ANT | America's Ready | Producer | |
| 2005 | Gary Gulman | Boyish Man | Executive producer | |
| 2005 | Greg Behrendt | Greg Behrendt Is Uncool | Executive producer | |
| 2005 | Jeff Cesario | You Can Get a Hooker Tomorrow Night | Producer | |
| 2005 | Ken Jeong, Steve Byrne, Bobby Lee | Kims of Comedy | Producer | |
| 2005 | Harland Williams | What A Treat | Producer | |
| 2006 | Dane Cook | Dane Cook: Vicious Circle | Producer | HBO |
| 2007 | Dane Cook | Rough Around the Edges: Live from Madison Square Garden | Executive producer | |
| 2007 | Frank Caliendo | Frank Caliendo: All Over the Place | Producer | TBS |
| 2007 | Kyle Cease | Weirder. Blacker. Dimpler. | Executive producer | Comedy Central |
| 2008 | Jeff Ross | No Offense - Live from New Jersey | Executive producer | Comedy Central |
| 2009 | Dane Cook | Isolated Incident | Executive producer | Comedy Central |
| 2009 | Dane Cook | 30 Premeditated Acts | Executive producer | |
| 2010 | Aaron Karo | The Rest Is History | Executive producer | Comedy Central |
| 2010 | Sinbad | Where U Been? | Executive producer | Comedy Central |
| 2010 | Whitney Cummings | Money Shot | Executive producer | Comedy Central |
| 2011 | Tom Arnold | That's My Story and I'm Sticking to It | Co-executive producer | Showtime |
| 2011 | Christopher Titus | Neverlution | Executive producer | Comedy Central |
| 2011 | Eddie Griffin | You Can Tell 'Em I Said It | Executive producer | Comedy Central |
| 2011 | Michael Ian Black | Very Famous | Executive producer | Comedy Central |
| 2011 | Nick Cannon | Mr. Show Biz | Executive producer | Showtime |
| 2011 | Nick Di Paolo | Raw Nerve | Executive producer | Showtime |
| 2011 | "Weird Al" Yankovic | "Weird Al" Yankovic Live!: The Alpocalypse Tour | Executive producer | Comedy Central |
| 2012 | Tom Papa | Tom Papa: Live in New York City | Executive producer | Comedy Central |
| 2012 | Aziz Ansari | Dangerously Delicious | Executive producer | |
| 2012 | Bill Burr | You People Are All The Same | Executive producer | Netflix |
| 2012 | D.L. Hughley | D.L. Hughley: Reset | Executive producer | Showtime |
| 2012 | Gary Gulman | In This Economy? | Executive producer | Comedy Central |
| 2012 | Jim Gaffigan | Jim Gaffigan: Mr. Universe | Executive producer | |
| 2012 | Jim Jefferies | Jim Jefferies: Fully Functional | Executive producer | Epix |
| 2012 | Jim Norton | Please Be Offended | Executive producer | Epix |
| 2012 | Joe Piscopo | A Night at Club Piscopo | Executive producer | |
| 2012 | Jordan Peele, Keegan-Michael Key, Marc Maron; Natasha Leggero, Jon Dore, Andy Daly; Judah Friedlander | CC:Stand-Up: The Bonnaroo Experience | Executive producer | Comedy Central |
| 2012 | Kevin Nealon | Kevin Nealon: Whelmed, But Not Overly | Executive producer | Showtime |
| 2012 | Louie Anderson | Big Baby Boomer | Executive producer | CMT |
| 2012 | Maria Bamford | The Special Special Special! | Executive producer | Chill.com |
| 2012 | Moshe Kasher | Live in Oakland | Executive producer | Netflix |
| 2012 | Todd Glass | Talks About Stuff | Executive producer | |
| 2012 | Tom Green | Tom Green Live | Executive producer | Showtime |
| 2012 | Tom Rhodes | Light, Sweet, Crude | Executive producer | Netflix |
| 2013 | Josh Blue | Sticky Change | Executive producer | Showtime |
| 2013 | Arnez J. | Racially Motivated | Executive producer | Netflix |
| 2013 | Harland Williams | Force of Nature | Executive producer | |
| 2013 | Aziz Ansari | Aziz Ansari: Buried Alive | Executive producer | Netflix |
| 2013 | Bo Burnham | what. | Executive producer | Netflix and YouTube |
| 2013 | Bob Saget | That's What I'm Talkin' About | Executive producer | Showtime |
| 2013 | Brian Posehn | The Fartist | Executive producer | Netflix |
| 2013 | Craig Ferguson | I'm Here to Help | Executive producer | Netflix |
| 2013 | Dana Gould | I Know It's Wrong | Executive producer | Showtime |
| 2013 | Dave Foley | Relatively Well | Executive producer | Showtime |
| 2013 | Doug Stanhope | Beer Hall Putsch | Executive producer | |
| 2013 | Greg Fitzsimmons | Life on Stage | Executive producer | Comedy Central |
| 2013 | Iliza Shlesinger | War Paint | Executive producer | Netflix |
| 2013 | Jim Breuer | And Laughter for All | Executive producer | Epix |
| 2013 | Kathleen Madigan | Madigan Again | Executive producer | Netflix |
| 2013 | Marc Maron | Thinky Pain | Executive producer | Netflix |
| 2013 | Mike Birbiglia | My Girlfriend's Boyfriend | Executive producer | Netflix |
| 2013 | Nick Cannon | F#ck Nick Cannon | Executive producer | Showtime |
| 2013 | Rob Schneider | Soy Sauce and the Holocaust | Executive producer | Netflix |
| 2013 | Shane Mauss | Mating Season | Executive producer | Netflix |
| 2013 | Tammy Pescatelli | Finding the Funny | Executive producer | Netflix |
| 2013 | Tom Papa | Freaked Out | Executive producer | Comedy Central |
| 2014 | Bill Burr | Bill Burr: I'm Sorry You Feel That Way | Executive producer | Netflix |
| 2014 | Chelsea Peretti | One of the Greats | Executive producer | Netflix |
| 2014 | Christian Finnegan | The Fun Part | Executive producer | Netflix |
| 2014 | Chris Porter | Ugly and Angry | Executive producer | Netflix |
| 2014 | Dennis Miller | America 180º | Executive producer | Epix |
| 2014 | D.L. Hughley | Clear | Executive producer | Showtime |
| 2014 | Doug Benson | Doug Dynasty | Executive producer | Netflix |
| 2014 | Eddie Pepitone | In Ruins | Executive producer | Netflix |
| 2014 | Elon Gold | Chosen and Taken | Executive producer | Netflix |
| 2014 | Jasper Redd | Jazz Talk | Executive producer | Netflix |
| 2014 | Jim Gaffigan | Obsessed | Executive producer | Comedy Central |
| 2014 | Joey Wells, Will Horton, Na'im Lynn | Kevin Hart Presents: Plastic Cup Boyz | Executive producer | |
| 2014 | Katt Williams | Priceless: Afterlife | Executive producer | HBO |
| 2014 | Keith Robinson | Kevin Hart Presents: Keith Robinson - Back of the Bus Funny | Executive producer | Comedy Central |
| 2014 | Morgan Murphy | Irish Goodbye | Executive producer | Netflix |
| 2014 | Myq Kaplan | Small, Dork, and Handsome | Executive producer | Netflix |
| 2014 | Nick Thune | In the Nick of Thune | Executive producer | |
| 2014 | Nick Thune | Folk Hero | Executive producer | |
| 2014 | Sinbad | Make Me Wanna Holla! | Executive producer | Comedy Central |
| 2014 | Sklar Brothers | What Are We Talking About | Executive producer | Netflix |
| 2014 | Steve Byrne | Champion | Executive producer | Netflix |
| 2014 | Todd Barry | The Crowd Work Tour | Executive producer | |
| 2014 | Tom Segura | Completely Normal | Executive producer | Netflix |
| 2015 | Anjelah Johnson | Not Fancy | Executive producer | Netflix |
| 2015 | Colin Quinn | Unconstitutional | Executive producer | Netflix |
| 2015 | Craig Ferguson | Just Being Honest | Executive producer | Epix |
| 2015 | Demetri Martin | Live (At the Time) | Executive producer | Netflix |
| 2015 | Eugene Mirman | Vegan on His Way to the Complain Store | Executive producer | Netflix |
| 2015 | Iliza Shlesinger | Freezing Hot | Executive producer | Netflix |
| 2015 | Jimmy Dore | Sentenced to Live | Executive producer | |
| 2015 | Lil Rel Howery | Kevin Hart Presents: Lil Rel: RELevent | Executive producer | Netflix |
| 2015 | Lisa Lampanelli | Back to the Drawing Board | Executive producer | Epix |
| 2015 | Matt Braunger | Big Dumb Animal | Executive producer | Netflix |
| 2015 | Sarah Colonna | I Can't Feel My Legs | Executive producer | Hulu |
| 2016 | Ali Wong | Baby Cobra | Executive producer | Netflix |
| 2016 | Aries Spears | Comedy Blueprint | Executive producer | |
| 2016 | Cameron Esposito | Marriage Material | Executive producer | Seeso |
| 2016 | Dan Levy | Lion | Executive producer | Seeso |
| 2016 | Doug Stanhope | No Place Like Home | Executive producer | |
| 2016 | Dwayne Perkins | Take Note | Executive producer | Netflix |
| 2016 | Ian Harvie | May the Best Cock Win | Executive producer | Seeso |
| 2016 | Janeane Garofalo | If I May | Executive producer | Seeso |
| 2016 | Jeff Foxworthy, Larry the Cable Guy | We've Been Thinking | Executive producer | Netflix |
| 2016 | Joey Diaz | Sociably Unacceptable | Executive producer | |
| 2016 | Matt Besser | Besser Breaks The Record | Executive producer | Seeso |
| 2016 | Michael Ian Black | Noted Expert | Executive producer | Epix |
| 2016 | Mo Mandel | Negative Reinforcement | Executive producer | Seeso |
| 2016 | Nick Thune | Good Guy | Executive producer | Seeso |
| 2016 | Steve-O | Guilty as Charged | Executive producer | Showtime |
| 2016 | Theo Von | No Offense | Executive producer | Netflix |
| 2016 | Tom Papa | Human Mule | Executive producer | Epix |
| 2016 | Tom Segura | Mostly Stories | Executive producer | Netflix |
| 2017 | Andrew Santino | Home Field Advantage | Executive producer | Showtime |
| 2017 | Adam Newman | Fuzzies | Executive producer | Seeso |
| 2017 | Anjelah Johnson | Mahalo and Good Night | Executive producer | Epix |
| 2017 | Bill Burr | Walk Your Way Out | Executive producer | Netflix |
| 2017 | Bob Saget | Zero to Sixty | Executive producer | |
| 2017 | Brad Paisley | Comedy Rodeo | Executive producer | Netflix |
| 2017 | Brent Weinbach | Appealing to the Mainstream | Executive producer | Seeso |
| 2017 | Brian Posehn | 25x2 | Executive producer | Seeso |
| 2017 | Bryan Callen | Never Grow Up | Executive producer | |
| 2017 | Brody Stevens | Live from the Main Room | Executive producer | |
| 2017 | Christina Pazsitzky | Mother Inferior | Executive producer | Netflix |
| 2017 | Craig Ferguson | Tickle Fight | Executive producer | Netflix |
| 2017 | DeRay Davis | How to Act Black | Executive producer | Netflix |
| 2017 | Doug Stanhope | The Comedians' Comedian's Comedians | Executive producer | |
| 2017 | Fahim Anwar | There's No Business Like Show Business | Executive producer | Seeso |
| 2017 | Jim Gaffigan | Cinco | Executive producer | Netflix |
| 2017 | Lavell Crawford | Home for the Holidays | Executive producer, director | Showtime |
| 2017 | Lynne Koplitz | Hormonal Beast | Executive producer | Netflix |
| 2017 | Maria Bamford | Old Baby | Executive producer | Netflix |
| 2017 | Nick Cannon | Stand Up, Don't Shoot | Executive producer | Showtime |
| 2017 | Nick Di Paolo | Inflammatory | Executive producer | |
| 2017 | Nick Offerman, Megan Mullally | Summer of 69: No Apostrophe | Executive producer | Epix |
| 2017 | Ophira Eisenberg | Inside Joke | Executive producer | |
| 2017 | Ryan Hamilton | Happy Face | Executive producer | Netflix |
| 2017 | Sasheer Zamata | Pizza Mind | Executive producer | Seeso |
| 2017 | The Lucas Brothers | On Drugs | Executive producer | Netflix |
| 2017 | Tiffany Haddish | She Ready! From the Hood to Hollywood | Executive producer | Showtime |
| 2017 | Todd Barry | Spicy Honey | Executive producer | Netflix |
| 2018 | Gordon Baker-Bone | Nobody? Just Me? | Executive producer | |
| 2018 | Dennis Miller | Fake News, Real Jokes | Executive producer, director | |
| 2018 | Ali Wong | Hard Knock Wife | Executive producer | Netflix |
| 2018 | Andy Sandford | Shameful Information | Executive producer | |
| 2018 | Darrell Hammond | Mayhem Explained | Executive producer | |
| 2018 | Demetri Martin | The Overthinker | Executive producer | Netflix |
| 2018 | Erik Griffin | AmERIKan Warrior | Executive producer | Showtime |
| 2018 | Forrest Shaw | Poor Decisions | Executive producer | |
| 2018 | Henry Rollins | Keep Talking, Pal | Executive producer | Showtime |
| 2018 | Ignatius Farray | Ignatius | Executive producer | |
| 2018 | Jim Gaffigan | Noble Ape | Executive producer | Comedy Central |
| 2018 | Jimmie Walker, Michael Winslow | We Are Still Here | Executive producer, director | |
| 2018 | Kevin Smith | Silent But Deadly | Executive producer, director | Showtime |
| 2018 | Liz Stewart | I'm Crowning | Executive producer | |
| 2018 | Louie Anderson | Big Underwear | Executive producer | |
| 2018 | Marlon Wayans | Woke-ish | Executive producer | Netflix |
| 2018 | Michael Magid | It's Not What It Looks Like | Executive producer | |
| 2018 | Moshe Kasher, Natasha Leggero | The Honeymoon Stand-Up Special | Executive producer | Netflix |
| 2018 | Owen Benjamin | Huge Pianist | Executive producer | |
| 2018 | Paul Rodriguez | The Here and Wow | Executive producer | |
| 2018 | Rita Rudner | A Tale of Two Dresses | Executive producer | |
| 2018 | Scott Thompson | Not a Fan | Executive producer | |
| 2018 | Steve Lemme, Kevin Heffernan | The Potential Farewell Tour | Executive producer, director | |
| 2018 | Tim Moffett | Farm Raised | Executive producer | |
| 2018 | Tom Arnold | Past and Present Imperfectly | Executive producer | |
| 2018 | Tom Segura | Disgraceful | Executive producer | Netflix |
| 2019 | Howie Mandel | Howie Mandel Presents: Howie Mandel at the Howie Mandel Comedy Club | Executive producer, director | Showtime |
| 2019 | Jim Gaffigan | Quality Time | Executive producer | Amazon |
| 2019 | Joel McHale | Live from Pyongyang | Executive producer, director | Comedy Dynamics |
| 2019 | Ezequiel Campa | En Vivo En y La Hierba | Executive producer | Comedy Dynamics |
| 2019 | Steve Treviño | 'Til Death | Executive producer, director | Comedy Dynamics |
| 2019 | Tone Bell | Can't Cancel This | Executive producer | Showtime |
| 2019 | Matt Braunger | Finally Live from Portland | Executive producer | Comedy Dynamics |
| 2019 | Bryan Callen | Complicated Apes | Executive producer, director | Comedy Dynamics |
| 2019 | David Cross | Oh, Come On | Executive producer | Comedy Dynamics |
| 2019 | Chris Porter | A Man From Kansas | Executive producer, director | Comedy Dynamics |
| 2019 | Marina Franklin | Single Black Female | Executive producer, director | Comedy Dynamics |
| 2019 | Lavell Crawford | New Look, Same Funny! | Executive producer, director | Showtime |
| 2019 | Mike E. Winfield | Stepman | Executive producer, director | Amazon |
| 2019 | Various comedians | #IMomSoHard Live | Executive producer, director | Amazon |
| 2019 | Alice Wetterlund | My Mama is a Human and So Am I | Executive producer, director | Amazon |
| 2019 | Gary Owen | #DoinWhatIDo | Executive producer, director | Showtime |
| 2019 | Matt Besser | Pot Humor | Executive producer, director | Comedy Dynamics |
| 2019 | Arsenio Hall | Smart and Classy | Executive producer, director | Netflix |
| 2019 | Preacher Lawson | Get To Know Me | Executive producer, director | BET+ |
| 2019 | Eddie Griffin | E-Niggma | Executive producer, director | Showtime |
| 2019 | Various comedians | The Irish Comedy Tour | Executive producer | Comedy Dynamics |
| 2019 | Alonzo Bodden | Heavy Lightweight | Executive producer | Amazon |
| 2019 | Celeste Barber | Challenge Accepted | Executive producer | Showtime |
| 2019 | John Crist | I Ain't Prayin' for That | Executive producer, director | Netflix; on hold |
| 2020 | Mary Prankster | Live at the Ottobar | Executive producer | Comedy Dynamics Network |
| 2020 | Tammy Pescatelli | Tammy Pescatelli's Way After School Special | Executive producer | Comedy Dynamics Network |
| 2020 | Larry the Cable Guy | Remain Seated | Executive producer, director | Comedy Dynamics Network |
| 2020 | Russell Peters | Deported | Executive producer | Amazon |
| 2020 | Maria Bamford | Weakness is the Brand | Executive producer, director | Comedy Dynamics |
| 2020 | Ilana Glazer | The Planet is Burning | Executive producer | Amazon |
| 2020 | Pete Davidson | Alive from New York | Executive producer | Netflix |
| 2020 | Tom Papa | You're Doing Great! | Executive producer | Netflix |
| 2020 | Jimmy O. Yang | Good Deal | Executive producer | Amazon |
| 2020 | Dan Cummins | Get Outta Here; Devil! | Executive producer, director | Comedy Dynamics Network |
| 2020 | Jesus Trejo | Stay At Home Son | Executive producer, director | Showtime |
| 2020 | Claudia Oshry | Disgraced Queen | Executive producer, director | Comedy Dynamics Network |
| 2020 | Jon Dorenbos | Life is Magic | Executive producer | |
| 2021 | Maz Jobrani | Pandemic Warrior | Executive producer | |
| 2021 | Chris Gethard | Half My Life | Producer | |
| 2021 | Michael Gelbart | All New Smash Hits | Producer | |
| 2021 | Dave Helem | DJ, the Chicago Kid | Director, executive producer | |
| 2021 | Ester Steinberg | Burning Bush | Director, executive producer | |
| 2021 | Daniel Webb | Hoe's Parade Live at the Rose Bowl | Director, executive producer | |
| 2021 | Erica Rhodes | La Vie en Rhodes | Director, executive producer | |
| 2021 | Natasha Pearl Hansen | I Was Supposed to Get Married Today | Executive producer | |
| 2021 | Harmony McElligott | The Struggle Continues | Executive producer | |
| 2021 | Jared and Robert | A Couple of Characters | Executive producer | |
| 2021 | Lavell Crawford | The Comedy Vaccine | Director, executive producer | |
| 2021 | Butch Bradley | From Las Vegas | Producer | |
| 2021 | Lance Woods | Undeniable | Executive producer | |
| 2021 | Pete Lee | Tall, Dark and Pleasant | Producer | |
| 2021 | Pedja Bajovic | The Balkan Brian | Producer | |
| 2021 | Erik Terrell | Live at the Helium Comedy Club | Producer | |
| 2021 | Ryan James | I'm Fine | Producer | |
| 2021 | Sam Tallent | Waiting for Death to Claim Us | Producer | |
| 2021 | Fatimah Taliah | Nice to Meet Me | Producer | |
| 2021 | Phillip Kopczynski | Live at Spokane Comedy Club | Producer | |
| 2021 | Jay Nog | Something from Nothing | Producer | |
| 2021 | Christian Finnegan | Show Your Work | Producer | |
| 2021 | Jim Gaffigan | Comedy Monster | Executive producer | |
| 2021 | Gary Owen | Black Famous | Director, executive producer | |
| 2022 | Cocoa Brown | Famous Enough | Director, executive producer | |
| 2022 | Katt Williams | World War III | Executive producer | Netflix |
| 2022 | Eddie Izzard | Wunderbar | Producer | |
| 2022 | Kim McVicar | Tap Dancing on My Mother's Grave | Producer | |
| 2022 | Helen Hong | Well Hong | Director, producer | |
| 2022 | John Crist | What Are We Doing? | Director, executive producer | |
| 2022 | Bill Bellamy | I Want My Life Back | Director, executive producer | |
| 2022 | Josh Gondelman | People Pleaser | Director, executive producer | |
| 2022 | Jackie Fabulous | Menoplause | Director, executive producer | |
| 2022 | Steven Michael Quezada | The New Mexican | Director, executive producer | |
| 2022 | Andrew Schulz | Infamous | Executive producer | |
| 2022 | Miz Cracker | Here I Stand | Director, executive producer | |
| 2022 | Katrina Davis | Figuring It Out | Director, executive producer | |
| 2022 | Maija DiGiorgio | Maija! Maija! Maija! | Director, executive producer | |
| 2022 | Kellen Erskine | Zoomed Out | Director, executive producer | |
| 2022 | Steve Byrne | The Last Late Night | Executive producer | |
| 2022 | Tom Papa | What A Day! | Executive producer | |
| 2022 | Earthquake | (Practice) The Secret Files of Earthquake | Executive producer | |
| 2023 | Jim Jeffries | High n'Dry | Executive producer | |
| 2023 | Peppermint | So-SIGH-ety Effects | Director, executive producer | |
| 2023 | Lavell Crawford | THEE Lavell Crawford | Director, executive producer | |
| 2023 | Darienne Lake | Altered Boy | Director, executive producer | |
| 2023 | Ginger Minj | Bless Your Heart | Director, executive producer | |
| 2023 | Bebe Zahara Benet | Africa Is Not A Country | Director, executive producer | |
| 2023 | Jimmy O. Yang | Guess How Much? | Executive producer | Amazon Prime |
| 2023 | Jinkx Monsoon | Red Head Redemption | Director, executive producer | |
| 2023 | Zarna Garg | One In A Billion | Director, executive producer | Amazon Prime |
| 2023 | Monét X Change | Fist of Glory | Director, executive producer | |
| 2023 | Jim Gaffigan | Dark Pale | Executive producer | |
| 2023 | Leah Rudick | Spiraling | Executive producer | |
| 2023 | Kevin James Thornton | Be Yourself | Director, executive producer | |
| 2023 | Malik Bazille | Who's Ya Homegirl | Director, executive producer | |
| 2023 | Bill Engvall | Here's Your Sign It's Finally Time It's My Last Show | Executive producer | |
| 2023 | Maria Bamford | Local Act | Executive producer | |
| 2023 | Hank Chen | I'm Not Supposed To Be Here | Director, executive producer | |
| 2023 | Subhah Agarwal | Airport Pigeon | Director, executive producer | |
| 2023 | Jose "Hoozay" Velasquez | Hoozay: The Salvadoran | Director, executive producer | |
| 2023 | Laurie Kilmartin | Cis Woke Grief Sl*t | Director, executive producer | |
| 2024 | Kim McVicar | Female Comedian | Director, executive producer | |
| 2024 | Roz Browne | I'm Roz Browne | Executive producer | |
| 2024 | Mary Basmadjian | Funny Armenian Girl | Director; executive producer | |
| 2024 | Nicole Burch | Mama Drama | Director; executive producer | |
| 2024 | Cara Connors | Straight For Pay | Director, executive producer | |
| 2024 | Big Mickey | Don't Be Confused | Director, executive producer | |
| 2024 | Sierra Katow | Funt | Director, executive producer | |
| 2024 | Sarah Hester Ross | Don't Mess With A Redhead | Director, executive producer | |
| 2024 | Edgar Rivera | Inbelievable | Director, executive producer | |
| 2024 | Samantha Ruddy | Baseball Mom | Director, executive producer | |
| 2024 | Rachel Scanlon | Gay Fantasy | Director, executive producer | |
| 2024 | Myka Fox | My Joke, My Choice | Producer | |
| 2024 | Nick Alexander | Nick Alexander Presents Nick Alexander | Producer | |

== Discography ==
=== Comedy albums ===
List of production credits with artist name, album, and selected details
| Year | Artist | Album | Format | Release date |
|---|---|---|---|---|
| 2021 | Jessi Campbell | The Sharpest Knife on the Porch | Digital | 26-Nov-21 |
| 2021 | Andrew Sleighter | Breakfast Stealer | Digital | 26-Nov-21 |
| 2021 | Eric O'Shea | Life: It's Not Your Fault! | Digital | 26-Nov-21 |
| 2021 | Dwight Slade | Animal Cracker | Digital | 26-Nov-21 |
| 2021 | Eddie Izzard | Sexie | Digital | 19-Nov-21 |
| 2021 | Pete Lee | Tall, Dark, And Pleasant | Digital | 12-Nov-21 |
| 2021 | Eddie Izzard | Live at Madison Square Garden | Digital | 12-Nov-21 |
| 2021 | Eddie Izzard | Live from Wembley | Digital | 5-Nov-21 |
| 2021 | Mark Gregory | Run with It | Digital | 29-Oct-21 |
| 2021 | Eddie Izzard | Glorious | Digital | 29-Oct-21 |
| 2021 | Zoltan Kaszas | Cat Jokes | Digital | 22-Oct-21 |
| 2021 | Rahn Hortman | Good Game | Digital | 22-Oct-21 |
| 2021 | Chelle T | It Just Got Real | Digital | 22-Oct-21 |
| 2021 | Christian Finnegan | Show Your Work | Digital | 22-Oct-21 |
| 2021 | Andy Erikson | Unicorn Style | Digital | 22-Oct-21 |
| 2021 | Christian Pieper | Glutton for Punishment | Digital | 22-Oct-21 |
| 2021 | Dwayne Perkins | Dwayne Explains | Digital | 22-Oct-21 |
| 2021 | Keith Stubbs | Poundcake | Digital | 22-Oct-21 |
| 2021 | Reno Collier | Monkeys and Stuff | Digital | 22-Oct-21 |
| 2021 | Dwayne Perkins | Please Believe It | Digital | 22-Oct-21 |
| 2021 | Brad Upton | Will Be Funny for Money | Digital | 22-Oct-21 |
| 2021 | Jay Whittaker | Safe for Work | Digital | 22-Oct-21 |
| 2021 | Eddie Izzard | Stripped | Digital | 22-Oct-21 |
| 2021 | Arvin Mitchell | Circus Purpose | Digital | 22-Oct-21 |
| 2021 | Kevin Bozeman | Clean and Unfiltered | Digital | 22-Oct-21 |
| 2021 | Greg Morton | I Started out, As a Baby | Digital | 22-Oct-21 |
| 2021 | Kermet Apio | There's No "I" In Self Esteem | Digital | 22-Oct-21 |
| 2021 | Andy Woodhull | World's Greatest Stepdad | Digital | 22-Oct-21 |
| 2021 | Jenna Kim Jones | Fun to Hug | Digital | 22-Oct-21 |
| 2021 | Kim Kerley | Do You Know Her? | Digital | 22-Oct-21 |
| 2021 | Collin Moulton | Anti-Animal Vegan | Digital | 22-Oct-21 |
| 2021 | Kellen Erskine | Composed | Digital | 22-Oct-21 |
| 2021 | BT | My Life as I Know It Now | Digital | 22-Oct-21 |
| 2021 | Kendra Cunningham | On My Best Behavior | Digital | 22-Oct-21 |
| 2021 | Eddie Izzard | Unrepeatable | Digital | 15-Oct-21 |
| 2021 | Eddie Izzard | Circle | Digital | 1-Oct-21 |
| 2021 | Phillip Kopczynski | Live at the Spokane Comedy Club | Digital | 1-Oct-21 |
| 2021 | Fatimah Taliah | Nice to Meet Me | Digital | 24-Sep-21 |
| 2021 | Lavell Crawford | The Comedy Vaccine | Digital | 24-Sep-21 |
| 2021 | Jamie Kaler | Homeschooled | Digital | 17-Sep-21 |
| 2021 | Eddie Izzard | Dress to Kill | Digital | 17-Sep-21 |
| 2021 | Eddie Izzard | Definite Article | Digital | 17-Sep-21 |
| 2021 | Eddie Izzard | Force Majeure | Digital | 10-Sep-21 |
| 2021 | Yakov Smirnoff | From Moscow...Idaho | Digital | 27-Aug-21 |
| 2021 | Ross Browne | Ja Know What I Mean? | Digital | 20-Aug-21 |
| 2021 | Yakov Smirnoff | As Long as We Both Shall Laugh! | Digital | 20-Aug-21 |
| 2021 | Yakov Smirnoff | I Bet You Never Looked At It That Way! | Digital | 13-Aug-21 |
| 2021 | Ryan James | I'm Fine | Digital | 13-Aug-21 |
| 2021 | Erik Terrell | Live At Helium Comedy Club | Digital | 6-Aug-21 |
| 2021 | Noah Gardenswartz | New Fodder | Digital | 6-Aug-21 |
| 2021 | Yakov | Happily Ever Laughter | Digital | 30-Jul-21 |
| 2021 | Yakov | United We Laugh | Digital | 23-Jul-21 |
| 2021 | Yakov | Just off the Boat | Digital | 16-Jul-21 |
| 2021 | Lance Woods | Undeniable | Digital | 9-Jul-21 |
| 2021 | Yakov | What a Country! | Digital | 9-Jul-21 |
| 2021 | Jim Breuer | And Laughter for All | Digital | 2-Jul-21 |
| 2021 | Louie Anderson | Big Baby Boomer | Digital | 2-Jul-21 |
| 2021 | Natasha Hansen | I Was Supposed To Get Married Today | Digital | 2-Jul-21 |
| 2021 | DL Hughley | Reset | Digital | 2-Jul-21 |
| 2021 | Harrison Greenbaum | Live at Madison Square Garden | Digital | 25-Jun-21 |
| 2021 | Taylor Hughes | Chasing Wonder | Digital | 18-Jun-21 |
| 2021 | Nick Rado | On-Trend | Digital | 14-May-21 |
| 2021 | Daniel Muggleton | Unprecedented | Digital | 7-May-21 |
| 2021 | Graham Elwood | First Nations Comedy Experience Vol 10 | Digital | 23-Apr-21 |
| 2021 | Erica Rhodes | La Vie En Rhodes | Digital | 16-Apr-21 |
| 2021 | Ester Steinberg | Burning Bush | Digital | 2-Apr-21 |
| 2021 | Dave Helem | D.J. The Chicago Kid | Digital | 26-Mar-21 |
| 2021 | Butch Bradley | From Las Vegas | Digital | 19-Mar-21 |
| 2021 | Whitney Cummings | Money Shot | Digital | 12-Mar-21 |
| 2021 | Ed Hill | Candy and Smiley | Digital | 5-Mar-21 |
| 2021 | Graham Elwood | First Nations Comedy Experience Vol 9 | Digital | 26-Feb-21 |
| 2021 | Graham Elwood | First Nations Comedy Experience Vol 8 | Digital | 19-Feb-21 |
| 2021 | Lewberger | Live At Lincoln Hall in Chicago | Digital | 12-Feb-21 |
| 2021 | Graham Elwood | First Nations Comedy Experience Vol 7 | Digital | 5-Feb-21 |
| 2021 | Maz Jobrani | Pandemic Warrior | Digital | 29-Jan-21 |
| 2021 | Various artists | First Nations Comedy Experience Vol 6 | Digital | 15-Jan-21 |
| 2021 | Anjelah Johnson | Not Fancy | Digital | 8-Jan-21 |
| 2021 | Various artists | First Nations Comedy Experience Vol 5 | Digital | 8-Jan-21 |
| 2021 | Jeremiah Watkins | Jeremiah Watkins: Family Reunion | Digital | 8-Jan-21 |
| 2021 | Various artists | First Nations Comedy Experience Vol 4 | Digital | 1-Jan-21 |
| 2020 | Various artists | First Nations Comedy Experience Vol 3 | Digital | 25-Dec-20 |
| 2020 | Various artists | First Nations Comedy Experience Vol 2 | Digital | 18-Dec-20 |
| 2020 | Jeremiah Watkin | Family Reunion | Digital | 11-Dec-20 |
| 2020 | Jeff Dunham | Relative Disaster | Digital | 11-Dec-20 |
| 2020 | Preacher Lawson | Get to Know Me | Digital | 20-Nov-20 |
| 2020 | Bryan Aylward | Big in Asia | Digital | 13-Nov-20 |
| 2020 | Arsenio Hall | Smart & Classy | Digital | 30-Oct-20 |
| 2020 | Melinda Hill | Inappropriate | Digital | 23-Oct-20 |
| 2020 | Jesus Trejo | Stay at Home Son | Digital | 2-Oct-20 |
| 2020 | Various artists | Brash Boys Club | Digital | 11-Sep-20 |
| 2020 | Bill Hicks | Flying Saucer Tour, Vol. 2 | Digital | 21-Aug-20 |
| 2020 | Bill Hicks | One Night Stand | Digital | 14-Aug-20 |
| 2020 | Hannibal Thompson | Out of Control | Digital | 7-Aug-20 |
| 2020 | Pat McGann | Sebastian Maniscalco Presents Pat McGann When's Mom Gonna Be Home? | Digital | 31-Jul-20 |
| 2020 | Gary Gulman | The Great Depresh | Digital | 24-Jul-20 |
| 2020 | Jim Gaffigan | Pale Tourist | Digital | 24-Jul-20 |
| 2020 | Eddie Griffin | E-Niggma | Digital | 26-Jun-20 |
| 2020 | Jamie Kaler | Happy Father Daze | Digital | 19-Jun-20 |
| 2020 | Gina Brillon | The Floor is Lava | Digital | 5-Jun-20 |
| 2020 | Craig Ferguson | Craig Ferguson Presents: Hobo Fabulous | Digital | 29-May-20 |
| 2020 | Gary Gulman | The Great Depresh | Digital | 15-May-20 |
| 2020 | Jimmy O. Yang | Good Deal | Digital | 8-May-20 |
| 2020 | Celeste Barber | Challenge Accepted | Digital | 8-May-20 |
| 2020 | Dan Cummins | Get Outta Here; Devil! | Digital | 1-May-20 |
| 2020 | Jay Jurden | Jay Jurden Y'all | Digital | 24-Apr-20 |
| 2020 | Gareth Reynolds | Riddled With Disease | Digital | 17-Apr-20 |
| 2020 | Michael Joiner | Shut up & Laugh | Digital | 17-Apr-20 |
| 2020 | Larry The Cable Guy | Larry The Cable Guy: Remain Seated | Digital | 17-Apr-20 |
| 2020 | Larry The Cable Guy | Remain Seated | Digital | 10-Apr-20 |
| 2020 | T.J | Son of Haiti | Digital | 3-Apr-20 |
| 2020 | Tammy Pescatelli | Way After School Special | Digital | 20-Mar-20 |
| 2020 | Gary Owen | #Doinwhatido | Digital | 13-Mar-20 |
| 2020 | Maria Bamford | Weakness is the Brand | Digital | 6-Mar-20 |
| 2020 | Chad Thornsberry | Smart Comedy from a Dumb Accent | Digital | 6-Mar-20 |
| 2020 | Craig Ferguson | Craig Ferguson Presents: Hobo Fabulous | Digital | 28-Feb-20 |
| 2020 | Fielding Edlow | Fielding Edlow: Can't Say Sl*t | Digital | 21-Feb-20 |
| 2020 | Carla Collins | Recovering Nudist | Digital | 7-Feb-20 |
| 2020 | Maria Bamford | Weakness is the Brand | Digital | 31-Jan-20 |
| 2020 | Tony Baker | Scaredy Cat | Digital | 24-Jan-20 |
| 2020 | Moshe Kasher | Crowd Surfing Vol. 1 | Digital | 24-Jan-20 |
| 2020 | Atsuko Okatsuka | But I Control Me | Digital | 17-Jan-20 |
| 2020 | Russell Peters | Deported | Digital | 17-Jan-20 |
| 2020 | Gary Owen | Urban Legend | Digital | 10-Jan-20 |
| 2020 | Various artists | Jay Leno Hosts the 1984 La Comedy Competition | Digital | 3-Jan-20 |
| 2020 | Ilana Glazer | Ilana Glazer: The Planet is Burning | Digital | 3-Jan-20 |
| 2019 | Various artists | Before They Were Kings Vol. 2 | Digital | 27-Dec-19 |
| 2019 | Jeff Dunham | Very Special Christmas Special | Digital | 20-Dec-19 |
| 2019 | Jeff Dunham | Relative Disaster | Digital | 20-Dec-19 |
| 2019 | William Lee Martin | The Nutcracker | Digital | 13-Dec-19 |
| 2019 | Various artists | Jenny Mccarthy's Dirty Sexy Funny | Digital | 6-Dec-19 |
| 2019 | Gareth Reynolds | Riddled with Disease | Digital | 6-Dec-19 |
| 2019 | Ruben Paul | Laughter Knows No Color | Digital | 6-Dec-19 |
| 2019 | Ray Moore | Rude Rudy | Digital | 29-Nov-19 |
| 2019 | Loni Love | America's Sister | Digital | 29-Nov-19 |
| 2019 | Jeff Dunham | All over the Map | Digital | 22-Nov-19 |
| 2019 | Jim Breuer | Let's Clear the Air | Digital | 22-Nov-19 |
| 2019 | Pete Correale | The Things We Do for Love | Digital | 15-Nov-19 |
| 2019 | Pete Correale | Let Me Tell Ya | Digital | 15-Nov-19 |
| 2019 | Steve Brown | Yeah, I Talk Like This | Digital | 15-Nov-19 |
| 2019 | Tom Wilson | Bigger Than You | Digital | 8-Nov-19 |
| 2019 | William Lee Martin | Standing in the Middle | Digital | 8-Nov-19 |
| 2019 | Robert Schimmel | Life Since Then | Digital | 1-Nov-19 |
| 2019 | Alonzo Bodden | Historically Incorrect | Digital | 25-Oct-19 |
| 2019 | David Crowe | Crooked Finger | Digital | 25-Oct-19 |
| 2019 | Eddie Griffin | Undeniable | Digital | 18-Oct-19 |
| 2019 | Hal Sparks | Charmageddon | Digital | 18-Oct-19 |
| 2019 | Steve Byrne | The Byrne Identity | Digital | 11-Oct-19 |
| 2019 | Jeff Dunham | Spark of Insanity | Digital | 11-Oct-19 |
| 2019 | Jamie Kennedy | Uncomfortable | Digital | 27-Sep-19 |
| 2019 | lonzo Bodden | Who's Paying Attention? | Digital | 20-Sep-19 |
| 2019 | Kristin Hensley & Jen Smedley | #IMomSoHard Live | Digital | 20-Sep-19 |
| 2019 | Alice Wetterlund | My Mama Is A Human And So Am I | Digital | 13-Sep-19 |
| 2019 | Noah Gardenswartz | White Men Can't Joke | Digital | 13-Sep-19 |
| 2019 | Turner Sparks | Live from the Friars Club | Digital | 6-Sep-19 |
| 2019 | Jeff Dunham | Don't Come Home for Christmas | Digital | 30-Aug-19 |
| 2019 | Kristin Hensley & Jen Smedley | #IMomSoHard Live | Digital | 23-Aug-19 |
| 2019 | Alonzo Bodden | Heavy Lightweight | Digital | 23-Aug-19 |
| 2019 | Mike E. Winfield | StepMan | Digital | 23-Aug-19 |
| 2019 | Jon Reep | Ginger Beard Man | Digital | 23-Aug-19 |
| 2019 | Alice Wetterlund | My Mama Is a Human and so Am I | Digital | 23-Aug-19 |
| 2019 | Jim Gaffigan | Quality Time | Digital | 16-Aug-19 |
| 2019 | Joel McHale | Live from Pyongyang | Digital | 9-Aug-19 |
| 2019 | Al Jackson | Baby Steps in a Yellow Tuxedo | Digital | 9-Aug-19 |
| 2019 | Margaret Cho | PsyCHO | Digital | 9-Aug-19 |
| 2019 | JoAnn Schinderle | Dark Jeans. | Digital | 2-Aug-19 |
| 2019 | Marina Franklin | Single Black Female | Digital | 26-Jul-19 |
| 2019 | David Cross | Oh, Come On | Digital | 26-Jul-19 |
| 2019 | Dan LaMorte | Infect Me Once | Digital | 19-Jul-19 |
| 2019 | Anjelah Johnson | The Homecoming Show | Digital | 12-Jul-19 |
| 2019 | Billy Gardell | Halftime | Digital | 5-Jul-19 |
| 2019 | Doug Stanhope | No Refunds | Digital | 5-Jul-19 |
| 2019 | Tone Bell | Can't Cancel This | Digital | 28-Jun-19 |
| 2019 | Heather Turman | Everything is Fine | Digital | 21-Jun-19 |
| 2019 | Ester Steinberg | Hebrew School Dropout | Digital | 7-Jun-19 |
| 2019 | Nick Griffin | Cheer Up | Digital | 31-May-19 |
| 2019 | George Wallace | Coming to the Stage Season 7 | Digital | 24-May-19 |
| 2019 | Bill Hicks | Revelations: Variations | Digital | 17-May-19 |
| 2019 | David Cross | Oh, Come On | Digital | 10-May-19 |
| 2019 | Tammy Pescatelli | #Tbt Throwback Tammy | Digital | 3-May-19 |
| 2019 | Jermaine Fowler | Give 'Em Hell, Kid | Digital | 3-May-19 |
| 2019 | Howie Mandel | Howie Mandel Presents: Howie Mandel at the Howie Mandel Comedy Club | Digital | 26-Apr-19 |
| 2019 | Jeff Dunham | Minding the Monsters | Digital | 12-Apr-19 |
| 2019 | Ester Steinberg | Hebrew School Dropout | Digital | 5-Apr-19 |
| 2019 | Bill Hicks | Bill Hicks - Revelations: Variations | Digital | 5-Apr-19 |
| 2019 | Jill-Michele Meleán | White Latina | Digital | 29-Mar-19 |
| 2019 | Nemr | No Bombing in Beirut | Digital | 22-Mar-19 |
| 2019 | Bryan Callen | Complicated Apes | Digital | 15-Mar-19 |
| 2019 | Bill Maher | Live from Oklahoma | Digital | 8-Mar-19 |
| 2019 | Barry Brewer | Chicago, I'm Home | Digital | February 22, 2019 |
| 2019 | Finesse Mitchell | The Spirit Told Me To Tell You | Digital | February 22, 2019 |
| 2019 | Henry Rollins | Keep Talking, Pal | Digital | February 15, 2019 |
| 2019 | Matt Braunger | Finally Live in Portland | Digital | February 8, 2019 |
| 2019 | Steve Treviño | Til Death | Digital | January 25, 2019 |
| 2019 | Daniel Muggleton | Let's Never Hang Out | Digital | January 11, 2019 |
| 2019 | Jared Stern | A Couple of Characters | Digital | January 11, 2019 |
| 2018 | Clark Jones | First of All | Digital | September 28, 2018 |
| 2018 | Liz Stewart | I'm Crowning | Digital | September 21, 2018 |
| 2018 | Rita Rudner | A Tale of Two Dresses | Digital | September 7, 2018 |
| 2018 | Elayne Boosler | 50/50 | Digital | August 31, 2018 |
| 2018 | Ezequiel Campa | En Vivo Y En La Hierba | Digital | August 31, 2018 |
| 2018 | Coming to The Stage | Season 6 | Digital | August 24, 2018 |
| 2018 | Shawn Pelofsky | Stretch It Out! | Digital | August 24, 2018 |
| 2018 | Luis Álvaro | Una Superestrella de la Comedia | Digital | August 17, 2018 |
| 2018 | Jimmie Walker, Michael Winslow | We Are Still Here | Digital | August 7, 2018 |
| 2018 | Gordon Baker-Bone | Nobody? Just Me? | Digital | August 3, 2018 |
| 2018 | Jim Gaffigan | Noble Ape | Digital | July 13, 2018 |
| 2018 | Scott Thompson | Not A Fan | Digital | July 6, 2018 |
| 2018 | Andy Sandford | Shameful Information | Digital | June 27, 2018 |
| 2018 | Michael Magid | It's Not What It Looks Like | Digital | June 11, 2018 |
| 2018 | Brody Stevens | Live From The Main Room | Digital | June 22, 2018 |
| 2018 | Tim Moffett | Farm Raised | Digital | June 11, 2018 |
| 2018 | Tom Arnold | Past and Present Imperfectly | Digital | June 8, 2018 |
| 2018 | Natalia Valdebenito | Gritona / Loudmouth | Digital | May 29, 2018 |
| 2018 | Neal Brennan | 3 Mics | Digital | May 25, 2018 |
| 2018 | Ignatius Farray | Ignatius | Digital | May 18, 2018 |
| 2018 | Wajatta | Casual High Technology | Vinyl | May 11, 2018 |
| 2018 | Paul Rodriguez | The Here & Wow | Digital | May 4, 2018 |
| 2018 | Patton Oswalt | Annihilation | Vinyl | April 21, 2018 |
| 2018 | Catalina Guzmán | Soy Mujer y Hago Show | Digital | April 13, 2018 |
| 2018 | Louie Anderson | Big Underwear | Digital | April 6, 2018 |
| 2018 | Bob Saget | Zero to Sixty | Vinyl | March 30, 2018 |
| 2018 | Forrest Shaw | Poor Decisions | Digital | March 30, 2018 |
| 2018 | Diego Camargo | Mucho Macho en Vivo Desde Bogotá | Digital | March 9, 2018 |
| 2018 | Laura House | Mouth Punch | Digital | March 2, 2018 |
| 2018 | Nat Baimel | Be Nice | Digital | February 23, 2018 |
| 2018 | Luismi Garcia | Colocado Cabe | Digital | February 16, 2018 |
| 2018 | Ian Bagg | Conversations | Digital | February 9, 2018 |
| 2018 | Owen Benjamin | Huge Pianist | Digital | February 2, 2018 |
| 2018 | Jay Nog | Put Me in Coach | Digital | January 26, 2018 |
| 2018 | Ben Rosenfeld | The United States of Russia | Digital | January 19, 2018 |
| 2018 | Yedoye Travis | OK | Digital | January 12, 2018 |
| 2018 | Miky McPhantom | Sin F/X | Digital | January 5, 2018 |
| 2017 | Taylor Williamson | Please Like Me | Digital | December 29, 2017 |
| 2017 | Bobby Comedia | Stand-Up Comedy | Digital | December 22, 2017 |
| 2017 | Bill Hicks | Revelations Live in London | Digital | December 22, 2017 |
| 2017 | Ian Harris | Extra Ordinary | Digital | December 15, 2017 |
| 2017 | Nick Hoff | Baby Daddy | Digital | December 15, 2017 |
| 2017 | Adam Mamawala | One of the Good Ones | Digital | December 1, 2017 |
| 2017 | Bob Saget | Zero to Sixty | Digital/CD | November 14, 2017 |
| 2017 | Ricardo Quevedo | Los Resentidos Somos Más | Digital | November 10, 2017 |
| 2017 | Kenny DeForest | B.A.D. Dreams | Digital | November 3, 2017 |
| 2017 | Anjelah Johnson | Mahalo and Goodnight | Digital | October 27, 2017 |
| 2017 | Jason Collings | School Shoes | Digital | October 20, 2017 |
| 2017 | Sean Sullivan | Song & Dance Man | Digital | October 13, 2017 |
| 2017 | Matt Goldich | The Matt Goldich Guarantee | Digital/CD | October 6, 2017 |
| 2017 | Jeff Foxworthy & Larry the Cable Guy | We've Been Thinking... | Digital/CD | September 29, 2017 |
| 2017 | Barry Crimmins | Whatever Threatens You | Digital | September 22, 2017 |
| 2017 | April Macie | No Shame | Digital | September 22, 2017 |
| 2017 | Ify Nwadiwe | The Community College Dropout | Digital | September 15, 2017 |
| 2017 | David Liebe Hart | Space Ranger | Digital | September 8, 2017 |
| 2017 | Doug Stanhope | The Comedians' Comedian's Comedians | Digital | September 1, 2017 |
| 2017 | Tiffany Haddish | She Ready! From The Hood To Hollywood | Digital | August 25, 2017 |
| 2017 | Various | Coming To The Stage Season Five | Digital | August 18, 2017 |
| 2017 | Fern Brady | Male Comedienne | Digital | August 11, 2017 |
| 2017 | Scott Gibson | Life After Death | Digital | August 4, 2017 |
| 2017 | Nick Cannon | Stand Up, Don't Shoot | Digital | July 28, 2017 |
| 2017 | Freddie Farrell | Excuse Me While I Burst Into Flames | Digital | July 21, 2017 |
| 2017 | Jeremy Arroyo | Groaners | Digital | July 14, 2017 |
| 2017 | Pete Holmes | Faces & Sounds | Digital/CD | July 7, 2017 |
| 2017 | David Dyer | Uncooked | Digital | June 30, 2017 |
| 2017 | Brent Weinbach | Appealing To The Mainstream | Digital | June 23, 2017 |
| 2017 | Andrew Santino | Homefield Advantage | Digital | June 23, 2017 |
| 2017 | Jim Gaffigan | Cinco | Digital/CD/Vinyl | June 13, 2017 |
| 2017 | Jeff Simmermon | And I Am Not Lying | Digital | June 9, 2017 |
| 2017 | Sasheer Zamata | Pizza Mind | Digital/CD/Vinyl | June 2, 2017 |
| 2017 | Clayton English | All The Same | Digital/CD | May 26, 2017 |
| 2017 | Daniel Muggleton | Let Me Finish | Digital | May 19, 2017 |
| 2017 | Fahim Anwar | There's No Business Like Show Business | Digital | May 19, 2017 |
| 2017 | Ali Wong | Baby Cobra | Digital/CD/Vinyl | May 12, 2017 |
| 2017 | Natalia Valdebenito | Gritona | Digital | May 5, 2017 |
| 2017 | Tom Segura | Mostly Stories | Digital/CD | April 28, 2017 |
| 2017 | Nick Di Paolo | Inflammatory | Digital | April 21, 2017 |
| 2017 | Bill Hicks | Live in Montreal | Digital | April 14, 2017 |
| 2017 | Coming To The Stage | Season Four | Digital | April 7, 2017 |
| 2017 | Adam Newman | Fuzzies | Digital | March 31, 2017 |
| 2017 | Mike Finoia | Live in Burlington | Digital | March 17, 2017 |
| 2017 | Brian Posehn | 25x2 | Digital | March 10, 2017 |
| 2017 | Ian Harvie | May The Best Cock Win | Digital | March 3, 2017 |
| 2017 | Nick Thune | Good Guy | Digital/Vinyl | February 24, 2017 |
| 2017 | Andy Kindler | State of the Industry Address (Just For Laughs 1996) | Digital | February 17, 2017 |
| 2017 | Joey Diaz | Sociably Unacceptable | Digital | February 10, 2017 |
| 2017 | Katie Goodman | Halfway Closer To Dead | Digital/CD | February 3, 2017 |
| 2017 | Aries Spears | Comedy Blueprint | Digital | January 27, 2017 |
| 2017 | Dan Levy | Lion | Digital/CD | January 20, 2017 |
| 2017 | Mo Mandel | Negative Reinforcement | Digital/CD | January 13, 2017 |
| 2017 | Janeane Garofalo | If I May | Digital/CD | January 6, 2017 |
| 2016 | Ivan Decker | I Wanted To Be A Dinosaur | Digital | December 23, 2016 |
| 2016 | Lisa Best | Brain Bank | Digital | December 16, 2016 |
| 2016 | Nick Flanagan | Wiped Privilege | Digital | December 16, 2016 |
| 2016 | Tom Papa | Human Mule | Digital | December 16, 2016 |
| 2016 | Ben Rosenfeld | The Russian Optimist | Digital | December 9, 2016 |
| 2016 | Bryan Callen | Never Grow Up | Digital | December 2, 2016 |
| 2016 | Peter Kelamis | The Best of Peter Kelamis: Volume One | Digital | December 2, 2016 |
| 2016 | Josh Blue | Delete | CD/DVD | November 25, 2016 |
| 2016 | Doug Stanhope | No Place Like Home | Digital/CD/Vinyl | November 18, 2016 |
| 2016 | Anthony Atamanuik & James Adomian | Trump vs. Bernie: Live from Brooklyn | CD | November 4, 2016 |
| 2016 | Anthony Atamanuik & James Adomian | Trump vs. Bernie: Live from Brooklyn | Vinyl | November 4, 2016 |
| 2016 | Katie Goodman | I Didn't F*ck It Up | Digital | October 21, 2016 |
| 2016 | Anjelah Johnson | Not Fancy | CD | October 21, 2016 |
| 2016 | Anjelah Johnson | Not Fancy | Digital | October 7, 2016 |
| 2016 | Todd Barry | The Crowd Work Tour | CD | October 7, 2016 |
| 2016 | Simon King | Furious | Digital | September 30, 2016 |
| 2016 | Sam Kinison | Last Recorded Performance | Digital | September 23, 2016 |
| 2016 | Sam Kinison | The Definitive Comedy Collection | Box Set | September 16, 2016 |
| 2016 | Sam Kinison | Breaking The Rules | Digital | September 2, 2016 |
| 2016 | Sam Kinison | Breaking The Rules | Vinyl | September 2, 2016 |
| 2016 | Todd Barry | The Crowd Work Tour | Digital | August 12, 2016 |
| 2016 | Colin Quinn | Unconstitutional | Digital | August 19, 2016 |
| 2016 | Colin Quinn | Unconstitutional | CD | August 19, 2016 |
| 2016 | Sam Kinison | Live In Vegas | Digital | August 5, 2016 |
| 2016 | Josh Blue | Delete | Digital | July 29, 2016 |
| 2016 | Anthony Atamanuik & James Adomian | Trump vs. Bernie: Live from Brooklyn | Digital | July 22, 2016 |
| 2016 | Sam Kinison | Family Entertainment Hour | Digital | July 22, 2016 |
| 2016 | Damon Millard | Shame, Pain, And Love | CD | July 8, 2016 |
| 2016 | Cameron Esposito | Marriage Material | CD | June 3, 2016 |
| 2016 | Mike Polk Jr. | Baseless Arrogance | CD | June 3, 2016 |
| 2016 | Mike Paramore | The Things We Tell Ourselves | CD | May 27, 2016 |
| 2016 | Mike Paramore | The Things We Tell Ourselves | Digital | May 27, 2016 |
| 2016 | Various Artists | Coming To The Stage: season 3 | Digital | May 20, 2016 |
| 2016 | Liam McEneaney | Working Class Fancy | Digital | May 20, 2016 |
| 2016 | Michael Ian Black | Noted Expert | Digital | May 20, 2016 |
| 2016 | Mike Polk Jr. | Baseless Arrogance | Digital | May 6, 2016 |
| 2016 | Bill Hicks | Rant In E-Minor: Variations | Digital | April 15, 2016 |
| 2016 | Bill Hicks | Rant In E-Minor: Variations | Vinyl | April 15, 2016 |
| 2016 | Ron Funches | The Funches Of Us | Vinyl | April 15, 2016 |
| 2016 | Mike O'Brien | Tasty Radio | Vinyl | April 15, 2016 |
| 2016 | Meshelle | Funny As A Mother... | CD | April 8, 2016 |
| 2016 | Steve-O | Guilty As Charged | Digital | April 1, 2016 |
| 2016 | Iliza Shlesinger | Freezing Hot | CD | March 25, 2016 |
| 2016 | Matt Besser | Besser Breaks The Record | CD | March 25, 2016 |
| 2016 | Cameron Esposito | Marriage Material | Digital | March 25, 2016 |
| 2016 | Keith Alberstadt | Walk It Off | Digital | March 18, 2016 |
| 2016 | Doogie Horner | A Delicate Man | Digital | February 12, 2016 |
| 2016 | Matt Besser | Besser Breaks The Record | Digital | February 5, 2016 |
| 2016 | Ron Funches | The Funches Of Us | CD | January 29, 2016 |
| 2016 | Iliza Shlesinger | Freezing Hot | Digital | January 29, 2016 |
| 2016 | Meshelle | Funny As A Mother... | Digital | January 22, 2016 |
| 2016 | Nick Guerra | Love The Nick's Tape | Digital | January 15, 2016 |
| 2016 | Jono Zalay | Snake Oil! | CD | January 8, 2016 |
| 2016 | Uncontrolled Comedy | Volume 2 | Digital | January 8, 2016 |
| 2015 | Adam Sank | Live From The Stonewall Inn | Digital | December 25, 2015 |
| 2015 | Mike O'Brien | Tasty Radio | CD | December 18, 2015 |
| 2015 | Beth Stelling | Simply The Beth | CD | December 18, 2015 |
| 2015 | Uncontrolled Comedy | Volume 1 | Digital | December 18, 2015 |
| 2015 | Roy Jackson | Ugly People Cause Problems | Digital | December 11, 2015 |
| 2015 | Judy Toll | Shareaholic | Digital | December 4, 2015 |
| 2015 | Bill Hicks | Arizona Bay Extended | Digital | November 27, 2015 |
| 2015 | Bill Hicks | Arizona Bay | Digital | 2015 |
| 2015 | Keith Robinson | Kevin Hart Presents Keith Robinson: Back Of The Bus Funny | DVD | November 20, 2015 |
| 2015 | Mike Recine | Union Delegate | Digital | November 20, 2015 |
| 2015 | Wali Collins | Ladies And Gentlemen... | Digital | November 20, 2015 |
| 2015 | Ron Funches | The Funches Of Us | Digital | November 13, 2015 |
| 2015 | Doug Benson | Doug Dynasty | Digital | November 6, 2015 |
| 2015 | Jay Pharoah | Can I Be Me? | DVD | October 30, 2015 |
| 2015 | Mike O'Brien | Tasty Radio | Digital | October 30, 2015 |
| 2015 | Jono Zalay | Snake Oil! | Digital | October 30, 2015 |
| 2015 | Sarah Colonna | I Can't Feel My Legs | Digital | October 23, 2015 |
| 2015 | Lil Rel Howery | Kevin Hart Presents: RELevent | Digital | October 23, 2015 |
| 2015 | Jimmy Dore | Sentenced To Live | Digital | October 16, 2015 |
| 2015 | Plastic Cup Boyz | Kevin Hart Presents: Plastic Cup Boyz | Digital | October 16, 2015 |
| 2015 | Beth Stelling | Simply The Beth | Digital | October 9, 2015 |
| 2015 | Various Artists | Coming To The Stage Season 2 | Digital | October 2, 2015 |
| 2015 | Brooks McBeth | This Ain't Shakespeare | Digital | October 2, 2015 |
| 2015 | Keith Robinson | Kevin Hart Presents: Back Of The Bus Funny | Digital | September 25, 2015 |
| 2015 | Kevin McDonald | Making Faces | Digital | September 18, 2015 |
| 2015 | Seaton Smith | Bologna Meat | Digital | September 18, 2015 |
| 2015 | Bill Hicks | The Complete Collection | Box Set | September 11, 2015 |
| 2015 | Nore Davis | Away Game | Digital | September 11, 2015 |
| 2015 | Adam Wade | The Human Comedy | Digital | September 11, 2015 |
| 2015 | Rudy Rush | Late To The Party | Digital | August 28, 2015 |
| 2015 | Various Artists | I Am Road Comic | DVD | August 28, 2015 |
| 2015 | Jay Pharoah | Can I Be Me? | CD | August 14, 2015 |
| 2015 | Various Artists | Pot's Greatest Hits | Digital | August 14, 2015 |
| 2015 | Jay Pharoah | Can I Be Me? | Digital | August 7, 2015 |
| 2015 | Jordan Carlos | The Blackest | Digital | July 31, 2015 |
| 2015 | Brian Gaar | Jokes I Wrote At Work | Digital | July 31, 2015 |
| 2015 | Lisa Lampanelli | Back To The Drawing Board | CD | July 24, 2015 |
| 2015 | Lisa Lampanelli | Back To The Drawing Board | Digital | July 24, 2015 |
| 2015 | The Dan Band | The Wedding Album | CD | July 10, 2015 |
| 2015 | The Dan Band | The Wedding Album | Digital | July 10, 2015 |
| 2015 | Taylor Negron | Uncabaret Presents Taylor Negron | Digital | June 29, 2015 |
| 2015 | Gallagher | Best Of Gallagher | Digital | June 23, 2015 |
| 2015 | Matt Braunger | Big Dumb Animal | Vinyl | June 2, 2015 |
| 2015 | Various Artists | Coming To The Stage: episode 4 | Digital | June 2, 2015 |
| 2015 | Various Artists | We Got Next, Vol. 11 | Digital | June 2, 2015 |
| 2015 | Various Artists | We Got Next, Vol. 12 | Digital | June 2, 2015 |
| 2015 | Shane Mauss | My Big Break | Digital | May 26, 2015 |
| 2015 | Various Artists | Coming To The Stage: episode 3 | Digital | May 26, 2015 |
| 2015 | Travis Howze | Reporting For Duty | CD | May 19, 2015 |
| 2015 | Various Artists | Coming To The Stage: episode 2 | Digital | May 19, 2015 |
| 2015 | Various Artists | We Got Next, Vol. 10 | Digital | May 19, 2015 |
| 2015 | Various Artists | We Got Next, Vol. 9 | Digital | May 19, 2015 |
| 2015 | Various Artists | Coming To The Stage: episode 1 | Digital | May 12, 2015 |
| 2015 | Craig Shoemaker | The Last Stand (Up) | Digital | May 12, 2015 |
| 2015 | Dave Stone | Hogwash | Digital | May 4, 2015 |
| 2015 | Brooks Wheelan | This Is Cool, Right? | Vinyl | May 4, 2015 |
| 2015 | Bill Hicks | The Essential Collection | Digital | April 28, 2015 |
| 2015 | Bill Hicks | Salvation | Digital | April 28, 2015 |
| 2015 | Bill Hicks | Relentless | Digital | April 28, 2015 |
| 2015 | Bill Hicks | Rant In E-Minor | Digital | April 28, 2015 |
| 2015 | Bill Hicks | Philosophy: The Best Of Bill Hicks | Digital | April 28, 2015 |
| 2015 | Bill Hicks | Love, Laughter And Truth | Digital | April 28, 2015 |
| 2015 | Bill Hicks | Flying Saucer Tour Vol. 1 | Digital | April 28, 2015 |
| 2015 | Bill Hicks | Dangerous | Digital | April 28, 2015 |
| 2015 | Bill Hicks | Arizona Bay | Digital | April 28, 2015 |
| 2015 | Bill Hicks | 12/16/61 | Digital | April 28, 2015 |
| 2015 | Tom Papa | Freaked Out | DVD | April 21, 2015 |
| 2015 | Tom McCaffrey | Adventures In Comedy | DVD | April 21, 2015 |
| 2015 | Eddie Pepitone | In Ruins | CD | April 21, 2015 |
| 2015 | Josh Sneed | Unsung Hero | Digital | April 21, 2015 |
| 2015 | Gallagher | Best Of Gallagher | Vinyl | April 18, 2015 |
| 2015 | Tom McCaffrey | Streets Aren't Watching | Digital | April 7, 2015 |
| 2015 | Travis Howze | Reporting For Duty | Digital | March 31, 2015 |
| 2015 | Sara Schaefer | Chrysalis | Digital | March 17, 2015 |
| 2015 | Cocoa Brown | One Funny Momma | Digital | March 10, 2015 |
| 2015 | Un-Cabaret | The Good, The Bad, And The Drugly | Digital | March 3, 2015 |
| 2015 | Un-Cabaret | The Un & Only | Digital | February 24, 2015 |
| 2015 | Tom McCaffrey | Adventures In Comedy | Digital | February 17, 2015 |
| 2015 | Eddie Pepitone | In Ruins | Digital | February 17, 2015 |
| 2015 | Matt Braunger | Big Dumb Animal | Digital | February 10, 2015 |
| 2015 | Rodney Perry | 44 and Still Ticking | Digital | February 3, 2015 |
| 2015 | Dana Gould | I Know It's Wrong | CD | January 27, 2015 |
| 2015 | Michael Kosta | Comedy For Attractive People | CD | January 27, 2015 |
| 2015 | Michael Colyar | Michael Colyar's Back | CD | January 27, 2015 |
| 2015 | Brooks Wheelan | This Is Cool, Right? | Digital | January 27, 2015 |
| 2015 | Tim Minchin | Tim Minchin and the Heritage Orchestra | DVD | January 20, 2015 |
| 2015 | Tim Minchin | So F*****g Rock | DVD | January 20, 2015 |
| 2015 | Thomas Dale | Love, Me | CD / Digital | January 20, 2015 |
| 2015 | Jeff Garcia | The Ten Dollar Ticket | Digital | January 6, 2015 |
| 2015 | Jeff Garcia | Livin' the Dream | Digital | January 6, 2015 |
| 2014 | Ophira Eisenberg | Bangs! | CD | December 15, 2014 |
| 2014 | Michael Colyar | Michael Colyar's Back | Digital | December 15, 2014 |
| 2014 | Gina Yashere | Skinny Bitch | Digital | December 15, 2014 |
| 2014 | Gina Yashere | Laughing to America | Digital | December 9, 2014 |
| 2014 | Dennis Miller | America 180 | DVD | November 24, 2014 |
| 2014 | Michael Kosta | Comedy for Attractive People | Digital | November 24, 2014 |
| 2014 | Kim Coles | #FunnyFiftyFine | Digital | November 17, 2014 |
| 2014 | D.L. Hughley | Clear | DVD | November 10, 2014 |
| 2014 | Jeff Garcia | Low Budget Madness | Digital | November 10, 2014 |
| 2014 | Ophira Eisenberg | Bangs! | Digital | November 4, 2014 |
| 2014 | Chris Turner | Pretty Fly | Digital | October 27, 2014 |
| 2014 | Dr. Katz | Live | Digital | October 21, 2014 |
| 2014 | Chris Franjola | The Shallow End | Digital | October 14, 2014 |
| 2014 | Jay Phillips | Mind of the Quiet Dude | Digital | October 7, 2014 |
| 2014 | Richard Jeni | A Big Steaming Pile of Me | Digital | September 30, 2014 |
| 2014 | Gallagher | Live | Digital | September 23, 2014 |
| 2014 | Greer Barnes | See What I'm Saying | Digital | September 9, 2014 |
| 2014 | Gallagher | Looking for Intelligent Life | Digital | August 26, 2014 |
| 2014 | Richard Jeni | A Good Catholic Boy | Digital | August 12, 2014 |
| 2014 | Richard Jeni | Platypus Man | Digital | August 12, 2014 |
| 2014 | Richard Jeni | Greatest Bits | Digital | August 12, 2014 |
| 2014 | Richard Jeni | The Beach Crowd | Digital | August 12, 2014 |
| 2014 | Richard Jeni | Roll With It | Digital | August 5, 2014 |
| 2014 | Andy Kindler | I Wish I Was Bitter | Digital | August 5, 2014 |
| 2014 | Chris Laker | Moments of Greatness | Digital | July 8, 2014 |
| 2014 | Kris Tinkle | Maybe I Don't Feel Like Smiling | CD / Digital | July 1, 2014 |
| 2014 | ANT | America's Ready | CD / Digital | June 17, 2014 |
| 2014 | Dennis Miller | America 180 | CD / Digital | June 17, 2014 |
| 2014 | Shane Mauss | Mating Season | Digital | June 17, 2014 |
| 2014 | Andy Haynes | Greatest Hits | Digital | May 27, 2014 |
| 2014 | Myq Kaplan | Small, Dork, and Handsome | CD / Digital | May 20, 2014 |
| 2014 | D.L. Hughley | Clear | Digital | May 13, 2014 |
| 2014 | Laffmob Presents | We Got Next, vol. 1-8 | Digital | May 13, 2014 |
| 2014 | Steve Byrne | Champion | CD/DVD Digipak / Digital | May 6, 2014 |
| 2014 | Sklar Brothers | What Are We Talking About | Digital | April 29, 2014 |
| 2014 | Mike Vecchione | Muscle Confusion | Digital | April 22, 2014 |
| 2014 | Elon Gold | Chosen and Taken | Digital | April 15, 2014 |
| 2014 | Christian Finnegan | The Fun Part | CD/DVD Digipak / Digital | April 15, 2014 |
| 2014 | Tom Segura | Completely Normal | Digital | March 18, 2014 |
| 2014 | Nick Thune | Folk Hero | Digital Video | March 11, 2014 |
| 2014 | Jasper Redd | Jazz Talk | Digital | March 11, 2014 |
| 2014 | Andy Sandford | Me the Whole Time | Digital | February 25, 2014 |
| 2014 | Chris Porter | Ugly and Angry | Vinyl / Digital | February 18, 2014 |
| 2014 | Arnez J. | Racially Motivated | Digital | February 4, 2014 |
| 2014 | Joe Zimmerman | Smiling at Wolves | Digital | January 28, 2014 |
| 2014 | Marc Maron | Thinky Pain | DVD / Digital | January 21, 2014 |
| 2014 | Morgan Murphy | Irish Goodbye | Digital | January 21, 2014 |
| 2014 | Tammy Pescatelli | Finding The Funny | Digital | January 14, 2014 |
| 2013 | Nick Cannon | F#ck Nick Cannon | Separate CD & DVD / Digital | December 10, 2013 |
| 2013 | Rob Schneider | Soy Sauce Holocaust | Digital | December 3, 2013 |
| 2013 | Mike Birbiglia | My Girlfriend's Boyfriend | Separate CD & DVD / Digital | November 26, 2013 |
| 2013 | Dana Gould | I Know It's Wrong | Digital | November 12, 2013 |
| 2013 | Kathleen Madigan | Madigan, Again, Again | Separate CD & DVD / Digital | October 8, 2013 |
| 2013 | Tom Papa | Freaked Out | Digital | October 1, 2013 |
| 2013 | Dave Foley | Relatively Well | Separate CD & DVD / Digital | September 24, 2013 |
| 2013 | Todd Glass | Live | Digital | September 17, 2013 |
| 2013 | Doug Stanhope | Beerhall Putsch | Separate CD & DVD / Digital | September 17, 2013 |
| 2013 | Iliza Shlesinger | War Paint | CD/DVD Digipak / Digital | September 3, 2013 |
| 2013 | Greg Fitzsimmons | Life on Stage | CD/DVD Digipak / Digital | August 27, 2013 |
| 2013 | Jim Norton | Please Be Offended | Separate CD & DVD / Digital | August 20, 2013 |
| 2013 | Craig Ferguson | I'm Here to Help | Separate CD & DVD / Digital | July 23, 2013 |
| 2013 | Bob Saget | That's What I'm Talking About | Separate CD & DVD / Digital | July 16, 2013 |
| 2013 | Moshe Kasher | Live In Oakland | CD/DVD Digipak / Digital | July 16, 2013 |
| 2013 | Brian Posehn | The Fartist | Separate CD & DVD / Digital | June 25, 2013 |
| 2013 | Kevin Nealon | Whelmed...But Not Overly | CD/DVD Digipak / Digital | May 28, 2013 |
| 2013 | Josh Blue | Sticky Change | CD/DVD Digipak / Digital | May 21, 2013 |
| 2012 | Tom Rhodes | Light, Sweet, Crude | Digital | |
| 2012 | D.L. Hughley | Reset | Digital | |
| 2012 | Tom Papa | Live In New York | CD with Comedy Central Records / Digital | |
| 2011 | Nick Cannon | Mr. Showbiz | Digital | |
| 2010 | Aaron Karo | The Rest Is History | Digital | |
| 2010 | Nick Di Paolo | Raw Nerve | Digital | |
| 2010 | Craig Shoemaker | Son of Lovemaster | Digital | |
| 2009 | Gary Gulman | Conversations with Inanimate Objects | Digital | |
| 2009 | Felipe Esparza | Rebound Material | Digital | |
| 2008 | Dan Levy | Running Out of Minutes | Digital | |
| 2008 | Whitney Cummings | Emotional Ninja | Digital | |
