= Adam Wade =

Adam Wade may refer to:

- Adam Wade (drummer) (born 1968), American drummer
- Adam Wade (singer) (1935–2022), American singer, drummer and television actor
- Adam Wade (storyteller) American storyteller and actor
