= Kiki Shepard =

American television host (1951–2026)

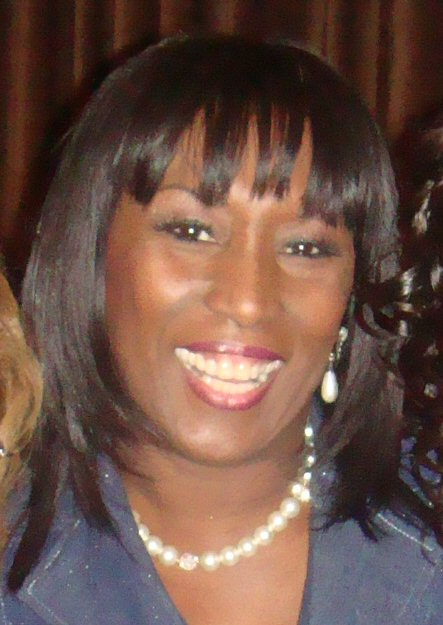
- Shepard, 2008.
- Born: Chiquita Renee Shepard; July 15, 1951; Tyler, Texas, U.S.
- Died: March 16, 2026 (aged 74); Los Angeles, California, U.S.
- Education: Howard University (BBA, 1974)
- Occupations: Television host; actress; dancer
- Years active: 1971–2026

Chiquita Renee Shepard (July 15, 1951 – March 16, 2026), known professionally as Kiki Shepard, was an American television host, actress and dancer best known as the co-host of Showtime at the Apollo from 1987 to 2002.

== Early years ==
Shepard was born on July 15, 1951, in Tyler, Texas, the daughter of John Edward Shepard and Dorothy Hortense (Simpson) Shepard. Her father coached high-school baseball and basketball after having played semiprofessional baseball. Shepard sang, put on plays, and taught American and English literature at a high school. Both parents were champion competitive dancers. Shepard's older sister, Von Gretchen, was the 1974 Miss Black America; her younger sister, Cassandra Pia, works in the art industry.

She attended Emmett Scott High School. She ranked in the top division of her class there and received a $125 scholarship from the Zeta Phi Beta sorority. She competed in the Tyler (Texas) Junior Miss pageant in 1968, and in 1971 she competed in the Miss Denton (Texas) pageant.

Shepard attended North Texas State University and has a Bachelor of Business Administration degree from Howard University. She was a member of Delta Sigma Theta sorority and graduated in the top 10 percent of her class.

== Career ==
Shepard began dancing worldwide in 1971. While she was a student at Howard she became a charter member of the D. C. Repertory Dance Company. The troupe that began as an experimental workshop participated in the World Festival of Black Arts in Lagos, Nigeria in February 1977. Shepard said of the group, "We were dynamite! We communicated. We created an uproar in Washington. We fulfilled a need in the community."

In 1976, Shepard performed at the Delacourt Summer Shakespearean Festival in New York and in Owens Song at the Kennedy Center. She was one of the dancers on the 1977 Academy Awards broadcast.

She worked as an actress and voice actor. She performed in several Broadway theatre productions in the 1970s and 1980s. They included Bubbling Brown Sugar (1976), Comin' Uptown (1979), Reggae (1980), Your Arms Too Short to Box With God (1980, 1982), and Porgy and Bess (1983).

Shepard appeared in the film The Wiz (1978). Her work on television included being co-star of Showtime at the Apollo for 16 years, hosting Live in Hollywood, and portraying singer Trelawney in Thunder in Paradise.

She co-starred in Single Black Female, a play that premiered in Wilmington, Delaware, in 2011.

== Death ==
Shepard was honored at the International Women's Day Gospel Brunch on March 8, 2026, at the Skirball Cultural Center in Los Angeles. She died from a heart attack in Los Angeles eight days later, on March 16, at the age of 74.

== Acting credits ==
=== Television ===
Year	Title	Role	Notes
1987–2002	Showtime at the Apollo	co-host	96 episodes
1991–1992	A Different World	Dr. Sutherland, Vanna Black	2 episodes
1993	Baywatch	Sophie Jones	2 episodes
1995–1996	Baywatch Nights	Madame Trudor, Charlene	2 episodes
2001–2002	NYPD Blue	Marta	3 episodes
2009	Everybody Hates Chris	Herself	
2022	Blackjack Christmas	Yollette	
2024	Mind Your Business	Mildred	2 episodes
2024	Grey's Anatomy	Erika Desai	1 episode

=== Theater ===
Year	Title
1976	Bubbling Brown Sugar
1979	Comin' Uptown
1980	Reggae
1980, 1982	Your Arms Too Short to Box with God
1983	Porgy and Bess

=== Video Games ===
Year	Title	Role	Notes
2026	Grand Theft Auto VI	The Local Population	Posthumous release
