= Showtime at the Apollo =

- Genre: Variety
- Presented by: (See hosts)
- Opening theme: "It's Showtime at the Apollo"
- Composer: Barry Fasman
- Country of origin: United States
- Original language: English
- No. of seasons: 22
- No. of episodes: 1,094

Production
- Executive producers: Percy Sutton (1987–2002); Bob Banner (1987–1996); Blake Bradford (2007–2008); Jim Roush (2016–2018); Chris Wagner (2016–2018); James McKinlay (2016–2018); Reggie Hudlin (2016–2018)
- Production location: New York City
- Running time: 60 minutes
- Production companies: Apollo Theatre Productions (1987–2008; 2016–18); Bob Banner Associates (1987–1996); Inner City Theater Group (1987–2002); The Heritage Networks (2002–2004); De Passe Entertainment (2002–2008; 2016–18); Telepictures Productions (2004–2008); The Roush Wagner Company (2016–2018)

Original release
- Network: Syndication
- Release: September 12, 1987 – May 24, 2008
- Network: Fox
- Release: March 1 – May 24, 2018

Showtime at the Apollo (formerly It's Showtime at the Apollo and Apollo Live) is an American variety show that first aired in syndication from September 12, 1987, to May 24, 2008. In 2018, the series returned on Fox with Steve Harvey hosting. Filmed at the Apollo Theater in Harlem, the show features live performances from both professional and up-and-coming artists, and also features the Amateur Night competition. In many cities such as New York (where it aired on WNBC), it often aired after Saturday Night Live during the late Saturday night/early Sunday morning hours, and was often paired with the similarly syndicated Soul Train.

A live non-televised version of the show takes place every Wednesday (which is the original Apollo Amateur Night competition that has been running for over seventy years), with the taped version of the show for television being recorded in advance on other nights for later airing.

== Hosts ==
Various musicians and entertainers acted as weekly guest hosts during the first two seasons. Stand-up comedian Rick Aviles was the first host of Amateur Night, serving in that role until midway through the second season.

From 1989 to 1991, Sinbad served as the permanent host. The series reverted to having guest hosts during the fifth and sixth seasons, with comics Mark Curry and Steve Harvey alternating as hosts of Amateur Night. In 1993, Harvey began a seven-year stint as the permanent host. At the start of the 1998–99 season, Harvey and Kiki Shepard hosted a series of "Best of..." episodes until late October because production was delayed due to a labor dispute. After Harvey left in 2000, he was replaced by Rudy Rush. Rush was joined by new comedic dancer C.P. Lacey, who replaced Howard "Sandman" Sims, who had retired. Harvey returned to host the Fox revival of Showtime at the Apollo, beginning on March 1, 2018.

=== Change of production ===
The original show was created by veteran television producer Bob Banner in conjunction with Percy Sutton and was produced and directed by BBA senior producer Don Weiner. After a dispute with the Apollo Theater Foundation in 2002, the original producers minus Bob Banner, who was no longer with the show after 1996 left to start a rival show called Showtime in Harlem later known simply as Showtime. Showtime in Harlem was produced at the Brooklyn Academy of Music. The show was later moved to California and renamed Live in Hollywood, lasting one season in 2003 with Shepard as host. It's Showtime at the Apollo was subsequently produced by de Passe Entertainment. It was for a time, hosted once again by Sinbad, who briefly returned to the show in 2006 while Mo'Nique was on maternity leave. Whoopi Goldberg became the new host for the 2006–2007 season. At times, comedian and actor Anthony Anderson hosted during the 2006–2007 season.

== BET revival ==
It was announced on September 30, 2011, that the BET cable network would produce a similar show titled Apollo Live starting in 2012 with Tony Rock as the host. The judges are the legendary Gladys Knight; famed beatboxer Doug E Fresh, and Michael Bivins of the 1980s group New Edition and early 1990s group Bell Biv DeVoe.

== Fox specials/revival ==
Showtime at the Apollo was revived by Fox Broadcasting Company in 2016–2017 with a pair of specials hosted by Steve Harvey. The first, a two-hour showcase, aired on December 5, 2016, while the second aired on February 1, 2017. A Christmas special called Showtime at the Apollo: Christmas aired on December 14, 2017, with co-host Adrienne Bailon. It was later announced that Fox would start airing it as a weekly series in the 2017–18 television season, beginning March 1, 2018. Singer Cam Anthony won the 2018 season with his performance of the Bill Withers song, "Ain't No Sunshine".

== Awards and nominations ==
Showtime at the Apollo has won an NAACP Image Award for "Outstanding Variety Series/Special" in 1991. The show was nominated in 1996, 1998, and 1999 for the same category. In 2000, the show was nominated by the NAACP Image Awards for "Outstanding Youth or Children's Series/Special" for the "Apollo Kids Finals" special episode. However, that same year, former host Steve Harvey has won an Image Award for "Outstanding Performance in a Variety Series/Special".
