= Ant (comedian) =

American comedian and actor (born 1967)

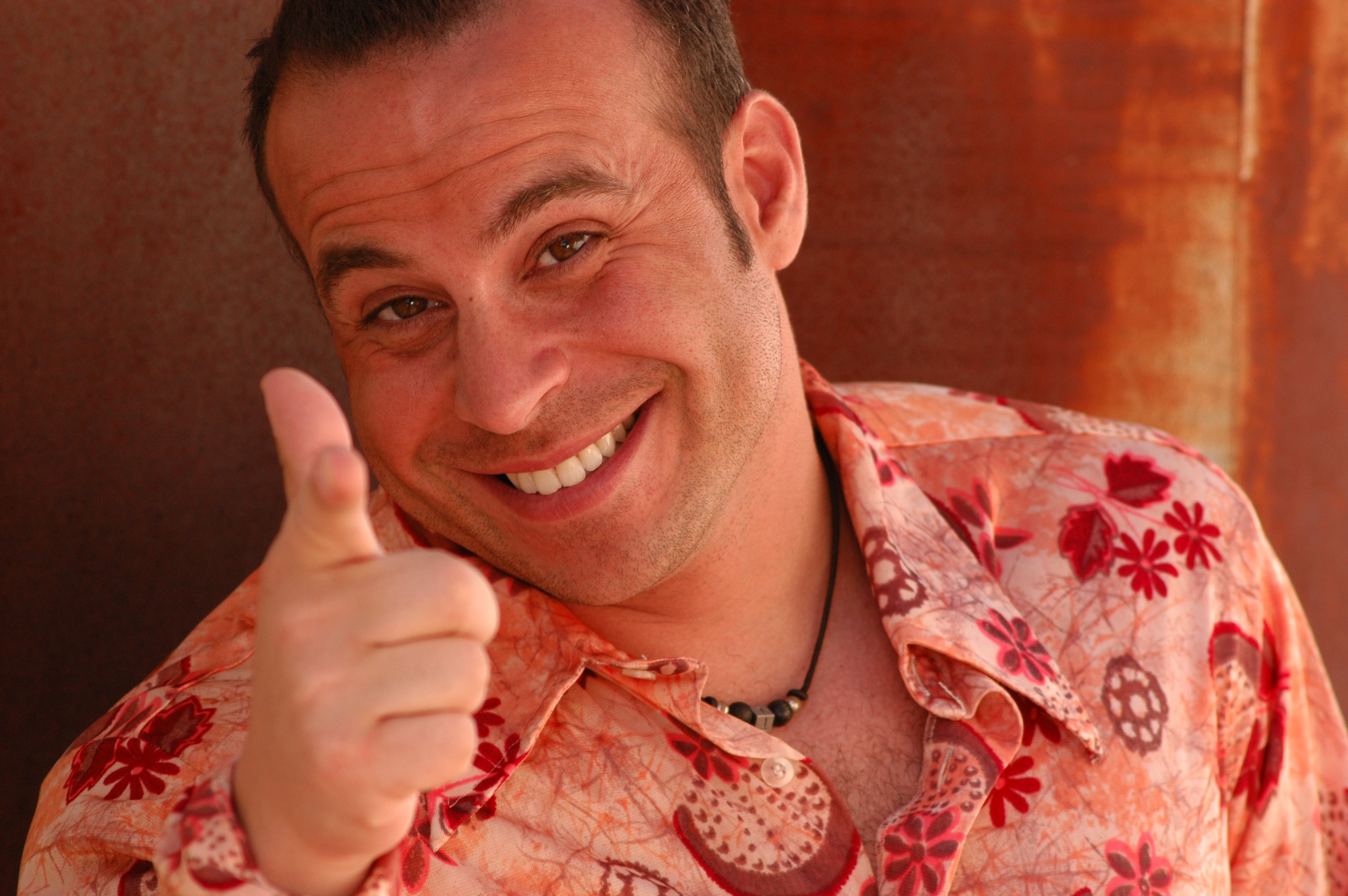
- Born: Anthony Steven Kalloniatis; August 23, 1967 (age 59); Boston, Massachusetts, U.S.
- Occupations: Actor; Comedian; Television host
- Years active: 1991–present
- Website: www.antcomic.com

Ant (born Anthony Steven Kalloniatis; August 23, 1967) is an American stand-up comedian and actor. He legally changed his name to Ant in 1993.

== Career ==
Ant performed at comedy clubs across the US beginning in 1991.

In 1995, he was a semi-regular cast member on the WB series Unhappily Ever After, spending four seasons on the sitcom.

Ant appeared as a contestant on Last Comic Standing, competing in seasons two and three.

He was the host of VH1 reality series Celebrity Fit Club and was a regular judge of talent on Steve Harvey's Big Time. His television series U.S. of Ant premiered on MTV's gay-targeted Logo cable channel in the summer of 2006. Ant also frequently appeared as a commentator on shows such as VH1's Best Week Ever and CNBC's Dennis Miller, and was a regular guest on The Tyra Banks Show, The Tonight Show with Jay Leno as well as The Howard Stern Show.

In 2007, he appeared along with Snoop Dogg as a guest star on MTV's sketch comedy show Short Circuitz.

Ant appeared as a regular celebrity guest on the game show To Tell the Truth, alongside Jackée Harry, Meshach Taylor and John O'Hurley.

In 2008, he was a contestant on VH1's reality competition Celebracadabra, where celebrities trained with established magicians, and competed in an elimination-format contest. Ant was eliminated in episode 2 and brought back in episode 4, but did not go on to win.

Ant is a former host of the Second Chances podcast with comedian Greg Baldwin.

== Filmography ==
=== Films ===
Year	Film	Role	Director	Notes
1996	Casa Hollywood	Hollywood Kid	Mark Decker	
1999	Twin Falls Idaho	Tre	Michael Polish	
1999	The Underground Comedy Movie	Gay Man	Vince Offer	
1999	Angels, Baby!	Kenny	Jeff Fisher	Short film
2001	WebCam Boys	Self		Documentary
2001	Circuit	Video Circuit Man	Dirk Shafer	
2006	Another Gay Movie	Naughty Paramedic	Todd Stephens	
2007	Totally Baked	Reginald Stevens	Lee Abbott	Segment "Smoke Pot Not Cock"
2010	I Am Comic	Self	Jordan Brady	Documentary
2011	Sister Mary	Agent Peccant	Scott Grenke	
2011	A Toast to Green Lantern	Club Guy	Liz Stewart Barnes	Short film
2011	Man 2 Man: A Gay Man's Guide to Finding Love	Comedian	Christopher Hines	Documentary
2016	Sticky: A (Self) Love Story	Self	Nicholas Tana	Documentary
2016	Let Them Eat Lead	Ben	Robert J. Conant	Short film

=== Television ===
Year(s)	Title	Role(s)	Notes
1995–1996	Night Stand with Dick Dietrick	Jonathon Felcher	S1E5 "It's My Body and I'll Cry If I Want To"; S1E51 "Follow-Up Show"
1995–1997	Unhappily Ever After	Barry	29 episodes
1996	Sweet Valley High	Pool Shark	S2E17 "Totally Cueless". Credited as Ant T. Em
1998	Make Me Laugh	Self (Comedian)	Episode "Bradford, Tessa, John"
2000	The Jamie Foxx Show	Flamboyant Man	S5E5 "I'll Do It My Dammy.com"
2000–2002	To Tell the Truth	Self (Guest Panelist)	
2001	Son of the Beach	Jerry Agfay	S2E1 "B.J. Blue Hawaii"
2001	The Man Show	Annoying Flight Attendant (uncredited)	S3E3 "Fast Cars and Fast Women"
2003–2007	Last Comic Standing	Self	7 episodes
2004	A2Z	Comedian Panelist	S1E4 "Angelina Jolie"; S1E7 "Guns N' Roses"
2004	The 100 Most Memorable TV Moments	Self	Miniseries
2004	My Coolest Years	Self	S1E5 "In the Closet"
2004	Super Secret Movie Rules	Self (Comedian)	S1E1 "Slashers"; S1E4 "Sports Underdogs"; S1E6 "Disaster Movies"
2004–2005	Steve Harvey's Big Time Challenge	Self	8 episodes
2004–2005	Dennis Miller	Self (Correspondent)	
2004–2005	Redlight GreenLight	Self	
2004–2006	The Tonight Show with Jay Leno	Self	S12E114; S13E138; S14E161
2005	VH1 News Presents	Self	S1E14 "Plastic Surgery Obsession"
2005	Weekends at the D.L.	Self	S1E20
2005	VH1 Big in '05 Awards	Self	Television special
2005	But Can They Sing?	Self (Commentator)	
2005–2008	Celebrity Fit Club	Self (Host)	49 episodes
2006	I Love Toys	Self	Miniseries
2006	U.S. of Ant	Self (Host)	7 episodes
2006	Kathy Griffin: My Life on the D-List	Self	S2E5 "Puppy Chaos"
2006	Gene Simmons Family Jewels	Self	S1E3 "The Demon Lives"
2006	75th Annual Hollywood Christmas Parade	Self	Television special
2006	Midnight Money Madness	Self (Guest)	
2006–2009	The Tyra Banks Show	Self	5 episodes
2007	40 Greatest Reality TV Moments 2	Self	Television special
2007	Queer as Folk: Reunion	Self (Host)	Television special
2008	I Love the New Millennium	Self	S1E2 "2001"; S1E7 "2006"; S1E8 "2007"
2008	Oxygen's 25iest: Bad Girls Gone Good	Self	Television special
2008	Celebracadabra	Self (Contestant)	
2009	America's Next Top Model	Self (Comedian)	S13E8 "Interview 101"
2009	Comedy.tv	Self	S1E3
2010	Catch 21	Self (Celebrity Contestant)	S3E21 "TV Stars"
2010	Tosh.0	Self	S2E17 "World's Worst Comedian"
2011	The Middle	Little Guy	S2E16 "Hecks on a Plane"
2011	A Stand Up Mother	Self	Episode "House for Sale"
2016	Afternoon Delight Live on Hollywood and Vine	Self (Host)	Web series
2017	The Doctors	Self	S9E138; S10E52

== Legal issues ==
On September 30, 2008, Ant sued English presenter Ant McPartlin, best known as half of the presenting duo Ant & Dec, for US$30 million for using the name 'Ant' in the United States. The lawsuit, among other things, alleged trademark infringement and fraud. The suit was dismissed in May 2010.
