= Aaron Karo =

American stand-up comedian and author (born 1979)

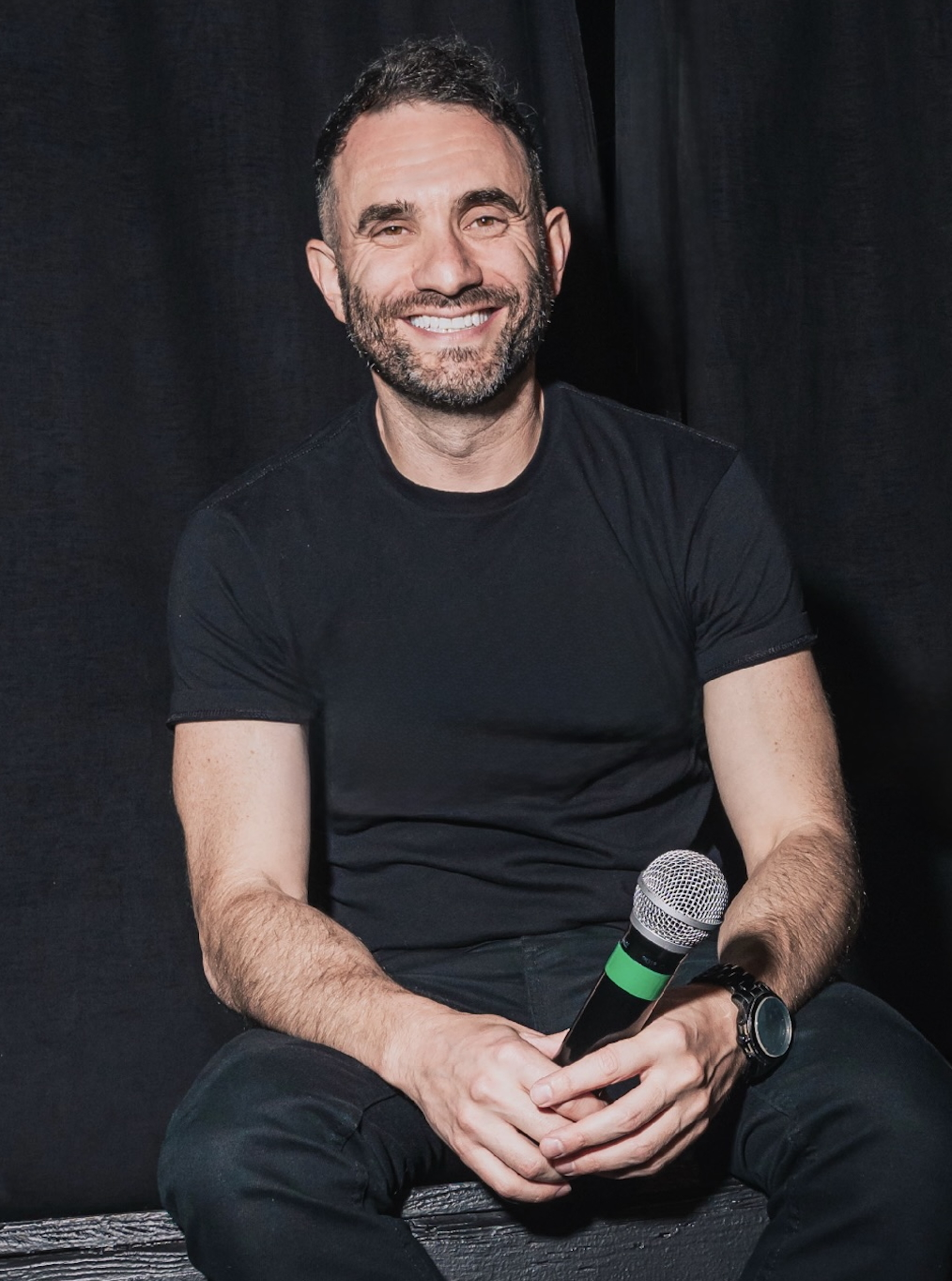
- Karo at the Netflix Is a Joke Festival in Los Angeles
- Born: June 18, 1979 (age 47); Plainview, New York
- Website: aaronkaro.com

Aaron Karo (born June 18, 1979) is an American screenwriter, comedian, and author, known for his Ruminations email column and series of books, his young adult novel Lexapros and Cons, Aaron Karo: The Rest Is History, and his podcast Man of the Year.
