= Shonali Bhowmik =

American singer

- Born: Nashville, Tennessee, United States
- Genres: Rock
- Occupations: Musician, actress, writer, producer, lawyer
- Instruments: Vocals, guitar
- Website: shonalibhowmik.com

Shonali Bhowmik is an American musician, actress, screenwriter, and producer. She also was one of the hosts of the Upright Citizens Brigade show Variety SHAC. She has performed in the bands Tigers and Monkeys, and Ultrababyfat.

== Early life ==
Bhowmik grew up in Nashville, Tennessee. She has a sister named Ruchi Bhowmik, and her parents are named Dilip Bhowmik and Shuba Bhowmik. She attended law school in Atlanta, Georgia.

== Career ==
=== Ultrababyfat ===
She began Ultrababyfat with her best friend, Michelle Dubois, as they had been playing music since they were children. David Cross discovered Ultrababyfat in Atlanta. Bhowmik then toured with Cross while filming his Let America Laugh DVD.

=== Tigers and Monkeys ===
Demetri Martin helped Bhowmik come up with the name for the band by asking her what her two favorite animals were, as she preferred to promote the band's shows with a band name rather than her own name.

=== Variety SHAC ===
Bhowmik hosted Variety SHAC throughout its entirety and was the "S" for the acronym SHAC. Shonali toured with Cross where she got her connection to the Upright Citizens Brigade where Variety SHAC held its shows for many years. Variety SHAC was given money to create a television pilot by IFC. Bhowmik also co-starred in the Variety SHAC videos which were completed annually. The members of Variety SHAC have been considered as some of the funniest women in comedy at the time of their show.

=== Discography ===
==== Ultrababyfat ====
- Eight Balls in Reverse (2001)

==== Tigers and Monkeys ====
- Loose Mouth (2007)
- The Animals Will Forgive Us Again (2014)

==== Solo releases ====
- 100 Oaks Revival (2011)
- One Machine At A Time (2024)

=== Filmography ===
- Sardines Out of a Can (2013)

== See also ==
- List of people from Nashville, Tennessee
