= Tom McCaffrey =

Australian rules footballer

Personal information
- Full name: Thomas Joseph McCaffrey
- Born: 21 December 1905; Coburg, Victoria
- Died: 5 February 1975 (aged 69); Ashwood, Victoria
- Height: 180 cm (5 ft 11 in)

Playing career^{1}
| Years | Club | Games (Goals) |
| 1929 | Fitzroy | 2 (1) |
- ^{1} Playing statistics correct to the end of 1929.

Thomas Joseph McCaffrey (21 December 1905 – 5 February 1975) was an Australian rules footballer who played with Fitzroy in the Victorian Football League (VFL).

McCaffrey later served in the Royal Australian Air Force during World War II.
