= Adam Wade (storyteller) =

American storyteller

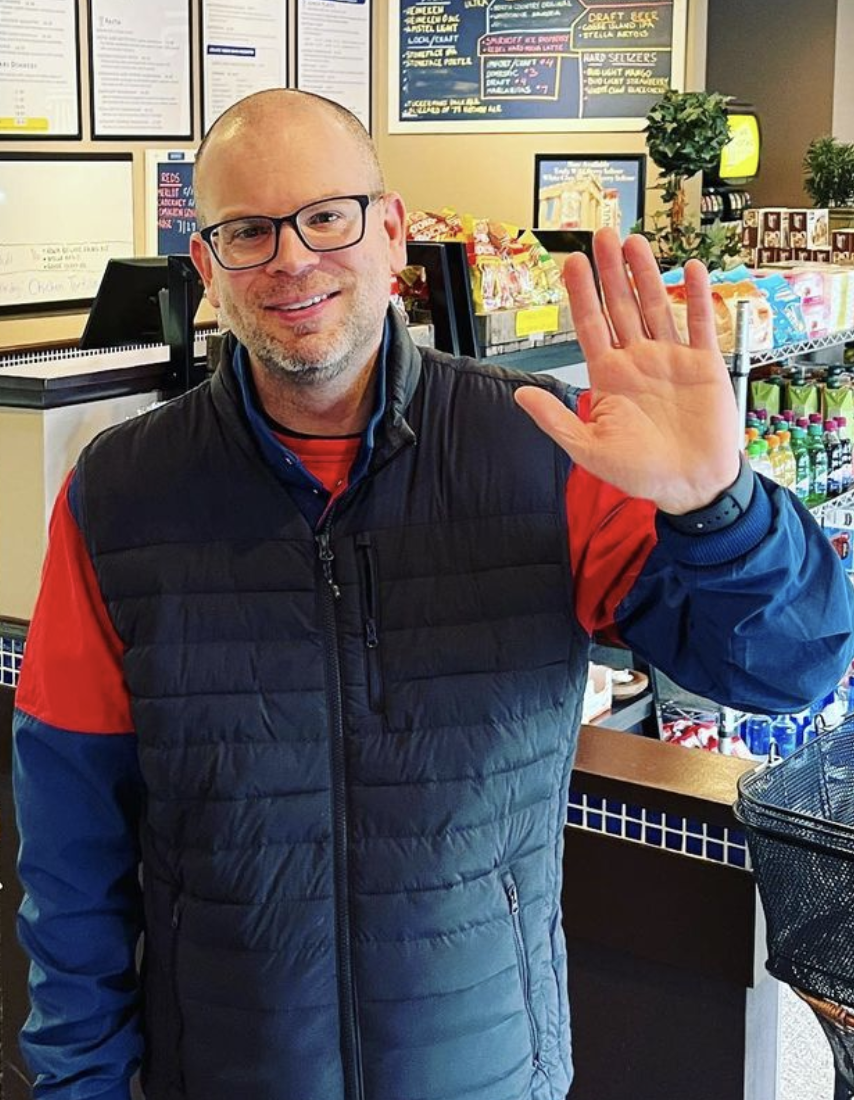
- Wade in 2022
- Occupation: Storyteller, Actor, Writer, Teacher

Adam Wade is an American storyteller. He is a record-holding 20-time winner of The Moth's StorySlam. He also acted alongside Shonali Bhowmik in the 2013 short comedy Sardines Out Of A Can. A story of his was featured on the Moth podcast in January 2009. He has made appearances on Tough Crowd with Colin Quinn and Late Night with Conan O'Brien. He published his Audible Original audiobook titled You Ought to Know Adam Wade in 2020.

== Biography ==
After graduating from Keene State College, Wade moved to New York City to take a course at New York University that came with an internship at Twentieth Century Fox. In his spare time, he became a public speaker, speaking to people about his stories in small facilities. A year or two afterward, Wade became an NBC page, which afforded him the opportunity to have regular appearances on ESPN. It was during this time he began doing standup, usually working with a guitar on stage. He then worked as a production assistant on Tough Crowd with Colin Quinn. During this time, Wade made the transition to omitting the guitar from his performances and telling stories instead (a suggestion of Quinn's). He was soon performing storytelling for The Moth and many other places, and described himself on stage to be a slightly amplified version of who he is.

Wade performs regularly at the Theatre Under St. Marks, the Upright Citizens Brigade Theater, and the Magnet Theater in New York City.

On April 5, 2012, he was featured in The New York Times' piece "Telling Tales With a Tear and a Smile". He has made numerous TV, radio, and film appearances including Comedy Central's Inside Amy Schumer, the NFL Network's Top 10 Football Follies, ESPN's Classic Now and WFMU's 7 Second Delay. He has contributed to Vulture.com and NY Press. He also started teaching courses on storytelling in New York, running private workshops on his own, and longer-running classes at the Magnet Theater.

In September 2015, Wade released his first comedy album, Human Comedy. On May 1, 2018, he released his second comedy album, Live at the Magnet Theater.

== Projects ==
- Conversations with Coders (2017): Wade is the host of this video series by Bloomberg.
- You Ought to Know Adam Wade (2020) is a comedic storytelling biography published as an Audible Original audiobook in January 2020. Wade is the author and narrator.

== Filmography ==
- Sardines Out Of A Can (2013)
- Inside Amy Schumer (2014/2015)
- Girls (2016)
