= Ian Patrick Harris =

Comedian and skeptic in Los Angeles

Ian Harris
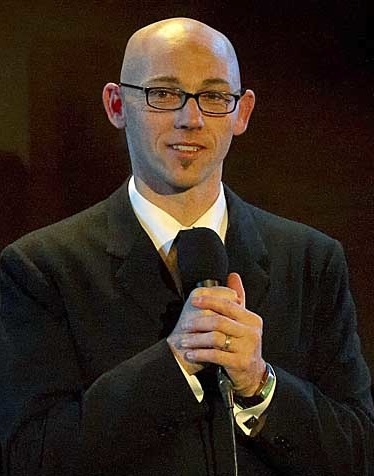
- Ian Patrick Harris on the set of his comedy special Critical & Thinking
- Born: 1971 (age 54–55); Santa Cruz, California
- Spouse: Jeaninne

Comedy career
- Medium: Stand-up

Ian Harris is a comedian, director, and mixed martial arts trainer. He owns a Los Angeles-based MMA training center called "Fight Science", named for the unique fighting style that he created. He integrates skepticism and critical thinking into his comedy.

== Early life ==
Harris was born and grew up in Santa Cruz, California, USA. He attended San Lorenzo Valley High School. He was interested in stand-up comedy, writing short stories, boxing, martial arts and surfing. He describes his upbringing there as being influenced by hippie counter-culture and punk rock.

== Career ==
=== Comedy ===
Harris moved from Santa Cruz to Los Angeles California, in 1992 with a friend. There they wrote the script Armaghetto, which they unsuccessfully tried to sell. Shortly after his arrival in Los Angeles he was asked, after an audition, to close the show Annex Sunday Night at the comedy club The Ice House. After that he toured the U.S. performing at comedy shows. He often appeared in the comedy club Punch Line.

In 2000, he moved back to Los Angeles, where he earned a reputation for being brash and irreverent in his comedy. However, in 2006 he stopped doing stand-up comedy and touring, because of his production work and the birth of his daughter in 2005. He has made fun of Vaccine controversies, glucose intolerance, politics, religions, and the homeopathic “cold preventer” Airborne. Six months after his comeback, Harris toured with comedians Jason Relser and Maurice Northup, doing a secular comedy show The Evolution of Comedy Tour.

Harris is also a regular contributing writer for US Weekly magazine's Fashion Police. Harris has performed his comedy act at several atheist and skeptical events:

- 2017 American Atheists National Conference
- 2012 Ascent of Atheism Convention in Denver
- 2013 American Humanist Association National Convention in San Diego
- 2013 CFI Summit in Tacoma, Washington

In 2014, he hosted a Sunday Assembly in Los Angeles and in 2013 he performed for Atheists United. Since 2015, Harris has been taking his comedy show to Atlanta's DragonCon, as part of the Skeptrack speaker roster.In the summer of 2017, Harris was added as a part-time co-host of Dogma Debate podcast with David Smalley. He frequently performs in socially conservative regions of the United States. He has stated that his audience in these areas often consists of a minority demographic that feels underserved by local media and cultural norms, contrasting this with larger metropolitan markets where his performances face more competition for audience attention. Harris contributed a comedy essay focusing on critical thinking to the Skeptical Inquirer magazine in 2017-2018 in a column called The Last Laugh. Since 2016 Ian has had a regular show at the pop culture fan convention, DragonCon in Atlanta with long-time friend, comedian Leighann Lord, called "The Science and Fiction Comedy Show" hosted by SkepTrack.

=== Voice-over ===
In 2003 Harris began performing voice-overs in a commercial for Universal Orlando Resorts that aired on the Super Bowl of the same year. Since then he has performed voice-over for commercials, television shows, network promos, video games and animation. Clients have included DirecTV, Lays Potato Chips, Full Tilt Poker, Round Table Pizza and the networks Disney XD, Bravo and Fuel. Harris was the narrator for Fuse's Mad Genius, Pepsi/Twitter Live for Now and Scripps Top 3 of Everything. He also does some voice over on Jimmy Kimmel Live.

=== MMA ===
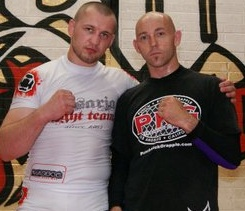
Ian Harris with Mariusz Domasat, Ireland MMA seminar, July 2011

Harris began boxing at age six. He wrestled for two and a half years and trained Kenpo Karate, Wing Chun and Japanese Jujutsu for nine years. He also trained from 1992 to 2005 with Richard Bustillo, a Bruce Lee student. With him, Harris trained Jeet Kune Do and Muay Thai. In 1996 he also began to train Brazilian jiu-jitsu with Claudio Franca. He began training other fighters in 2003. Harris has been featured in Tapout Magazine and Grappling Magazine teaching techniques and was showcased in the book MMA Lessons, a collection of the best MMA techniques from Tapout Magazine. Harris coined his MMA fighting style Fight Science. In August 2017, Harris, along with three of his former students, opened an MMA training center in Los Angeles. They named it "Fight Science," after the style Harris created.

=== Comedy ===
In the year 2001 he was on the Top 100 Comedians list of the Entertainment Business Journal, and he was a semi-finalist in Comedy Central's Laugh Riots Competition. Backstage West called him Top Character Comedian in Town, and he was a finalist in the San Francisco Comedy Competition.

- 1995 Finalist Cal State Chico Comedy Competition
- 1998 Finalist UCSF Comedy Competition
- 2000 Finalist San Francisco International Comedy Competition
- 2001 Semi-finalist Comedy Central Laugh Riots Competition
- 2013 Ventura Comedy Festival

=== Film ===
Harris directed a few comedy specials, including one by Dwayne Perkins, which was bought directly by Netflix. On December 21, 2012, he recorded his own comedy special Ian Harris: Critical & Thinking. Harris' second hour TV special "ExtraOrdinary" was released Dec 12, 2017, by Adam Carolla's Chassy Media and is available on video-on-demand platforms. It was produced with Netflix in mind, but due to policy changes in the company's comedy division they did not pick it up. It was recorded in 2016 at the Rio Theatre in his home town of Santa Cruz (California).

Harris also wrote and directed his first movie It Burns When I Laugh which won Best Feature Film at the Seattle Underground Film Festival. This film was presented in festivals, where it had a moderate success, then it was distributed on home video. Harris directed some other movies, short movies and music videos, and in 2013, he began to direct comedy specials for other fellow comedians.

- Official Selection, 2007 Newport Beach Film Festival
- Official Selection, 2007 Del Rey Beach Film Festival
- Best Short Nominee, 2007 Swansea Bay Film Festival
- Official Selection, 2006 Montreal Just For Laughs Comedy Festival
- Best Feature Film, Seattle Underground Film Festival
- Best Director, 2005 48 Hour Film Project, Los Angeles
- Best Use of Genre: 2005 48 Hour Film Project, Los Angeles
- Official Selection, 2005 Dances with Films Film Festival
- Official Selection, 2005 Best of LA Shorts Festival
- Audience Choice, 2004 48 Hour Film Project, Los Angeles
- Best Music, 2004 48 Hour Film Project, Los Angeles
- Finalist, 2003 Fade-In Magazine Short Film Awards
- Best Film, 2003 Zephyr Short Film Festival, Los Angeles
- Audience Choice Award, 2002 Colfax Film Festival
- Official Selection, 2003 Cal State Fullerton Call to Arts Festival

== Filmography ==
=== Director ===
- "Mike Merrill: Soliloquy" (2024) hour comedy special
- "Rich Chassler: Boy Outta New York" (2024) hour comedy special
- "What Matters" (2022) Oscar Listed Short filim
- "Dwayne Perkins: Take Note" (2016) hour comedy special
- "Ty Barnett: Issues" (2013) hour comedy special
- "Bryan Kellen: Ballet Komedico" (2013) Hour Comedy Special
- “Pashittu” Short Film (2006)
- “The Cult” Television Pilot (2006)
- “Booking Tacoma” Feature Film (2004)
- “It Burns When I Laugh” Feature Film (2003)
- “Silver Patriot: The Final Chapter” Short Film (2005)
- “The Paul Decca Story” Short Film (2004)
- “Ring Tone Blues” Short Film (2004)
- “Dual” Short Film (2002)
- “A.P.U. Art, Pot & Underwear” Short Film (2003)

=== Music videos ===
- “Darkest Days” Good Riddance, 2006 Fat Wreck Chords
- “Smoother than You” Danny Hamilton, 2005 Koala Records
- “Dance of Shiva” OUTLIE, 2004 Porterhouse Records
- “You Burn Me Up” The Haywoods, 2000 Wormtone Records

== Personal life ==
Harris been an atheist his whole life. He lives with his wife Jeaninne and their daughter Bella in Los Angeles, California, USA.
