= Jackie Fabulous =

American comedian and actress

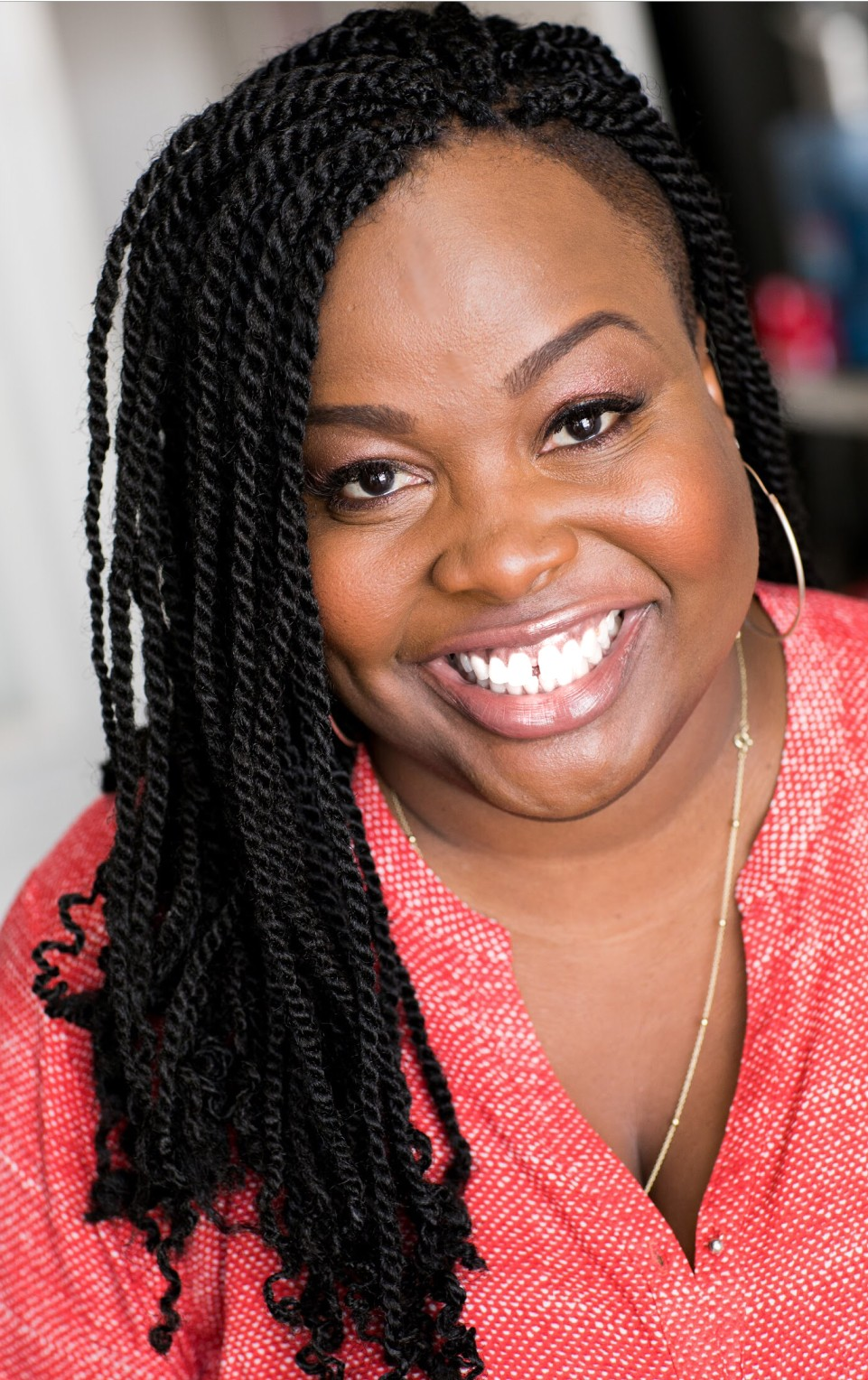
- Born: Jacqueline J. Champagnie; The Bronx, New York, U.S.
- Occupations: Comedian; actress; writer; producer
- Years active: 2005–present

Jacqueline J. Champagnie, known by the stage name Jackie Fabulous, is an American stand-up comedian and actress. Her career has involved several performances on television, including two television series that she wrote, as well as appearing on America's Got Talent in 2019.

== Life and career ==
Fabulous was born in The Bronx, New York, the daughter of a Jamaican immigrant family. She graduated from Trinity Law School. Her first comedy performance at the Hollywood Improv, was in 2005. She has been featured on the Arsenio Hall Show, Kevin Hart's LOL Network, Last Comic Standing, Gotham Comedy Live and more. In 2019, she entered the 14th season of the reality competition show America's Got Talent, finishing as a semi-finalist. Fabulous had a recurring role on the Showtime comedy series, Flatbush Misdemeanors.

== Filmography ==
Year	Title	Writer	Producer	Note
2009	Who's Got Jokes?	✓		TV series
2011	Jackie N' Ro	✓	✓	TV series

As Actress

Year	Title	Role	Note
2010	Ordinary Girl	Bachelorette Friend	Short film
2011–2012	NTSF:SD:SUV::	Mom	Feature film
2012	Southland	Karla Evans	1 episode
2012	Impounded	Impounder	Short film
2012	Raising Whitley	Jamaican Nanny	1 episode

== Works and publications ==
- Find Your Fabulous ISBN 978-0-9837059-0-1
- Who Is Jackie Fabulous? (Comedy album)
- Relatable with Jackie Fabulous (Podcast)
- Fabulously Naughty (Comedy album)
