= Rudy Rush =

American comedian (born 1973)

- Born: September 27, 1973 (age 53)

Comedy career
- Medium: Television, Stand-Up

Rudy Rush (born September 27, 1973) is an American comedian.

In 2000, he became the host of Showtime at the Apollo.
