= VH1 Big in '05 Awards =

2005 American entertainment awards

- Date: December 4, 2005
- Website: http://www.vh1.com/shows/events/big_in/2005/

Television/radio coverage
- Network: VH1

VH1's Big in '05 was an award show that aired on VH1 on December 4, 2005 on VH1 in the United States. It is the annual VH1's Big in... Awards. Fall Out Boy was one of the performers.

== List of winners ==
- BIG Entertainer – Kanye West
- BIG Music Artist – Green Day
- BIG Download – Hollaback Girl
- BIG Breakthrough – Fall Out Boy
- BIG Reality Star – Bo Bice
- BIG Shocker – Michael Jackson
- BIG Stylin' – Jessica Simpson
- BIG Feud – Angelina Jolie vs Jennifer Aniston
- BIG Quote – Kanye West
- BIG Old School Triumph – INXS
- BIG "IT" Girl – Lindsay Lohan
