= U.S. of Ant =

- Genre: Reality
- Starring: Ant
- No. of seasons: 1
- No. of episodes: 7

Production
- Running time: 24 minutes

Original release
- Network: Logo

U.S. of Ant is a gay-and travel-themed series aired by Logo. Hosted by actor and comedian Ant, the series follows him as he travels to small-town American destinations, speaking with gay, bisexual and straight residents of various communities to learn about the spirit and aspects of LGBT life away from a metropolitan setting. The series premiered in summer 2006.

In its first season, Ant traveled to such diverse locales as Montana, Mississippi, North Carolina, Alabama, New Hampshire, Texas and Florida.

Full episodes of U.S. of Ant may be viewed for free at its official Logo website. The series is also available for download from the iTunes Store.
