= Priscilla Barnes =

American actress

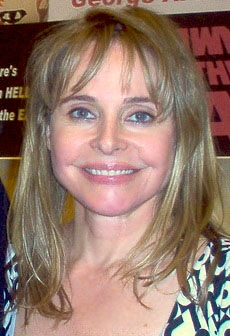
- Barnes in 2006
- Born: 1953 or 1954 (age 71–72); Fort Dix, New Jersey, U.S.
- Education: Antelope Valley High School
- Occupation: Actress
- Years active: 1973–present
- Known for: Three's Company; Jane the Virgin
- Spouse: Ted Monte (m. 2003)

Priscilla Barnes (born 1953 or 1954) is an American actress. She is best known for her role as Terri Alden in the ABC sitcom Three's Company between 1981 and 1984. Barnes also has appeared in films, including A Vacation in Hell (1979), Licence to Kill (1989), Stepfather III (1992), The Crossing Guard (1995), Mallrats (1995), The Devil's Rejects (2005) and The Visitation (2006). From 2014 to 2019, Barnes played Magda Andel in the CW comedy-drama series Jane the Virgin.

== Early life ==
Barnes was born in Fort Dix, New Jersey, the third of four children of a father who was a major in the United States Air Force and a mother who was a homemaker. Her childhood was marked by a series of moves across military bases throughout the country before her family settled in Lancaster, California. After graduating from Antelope Valley High School at age 17, Barnes relocated to San Diego, working as a waitress and a dancer.

== Career ==
=== Early career ===
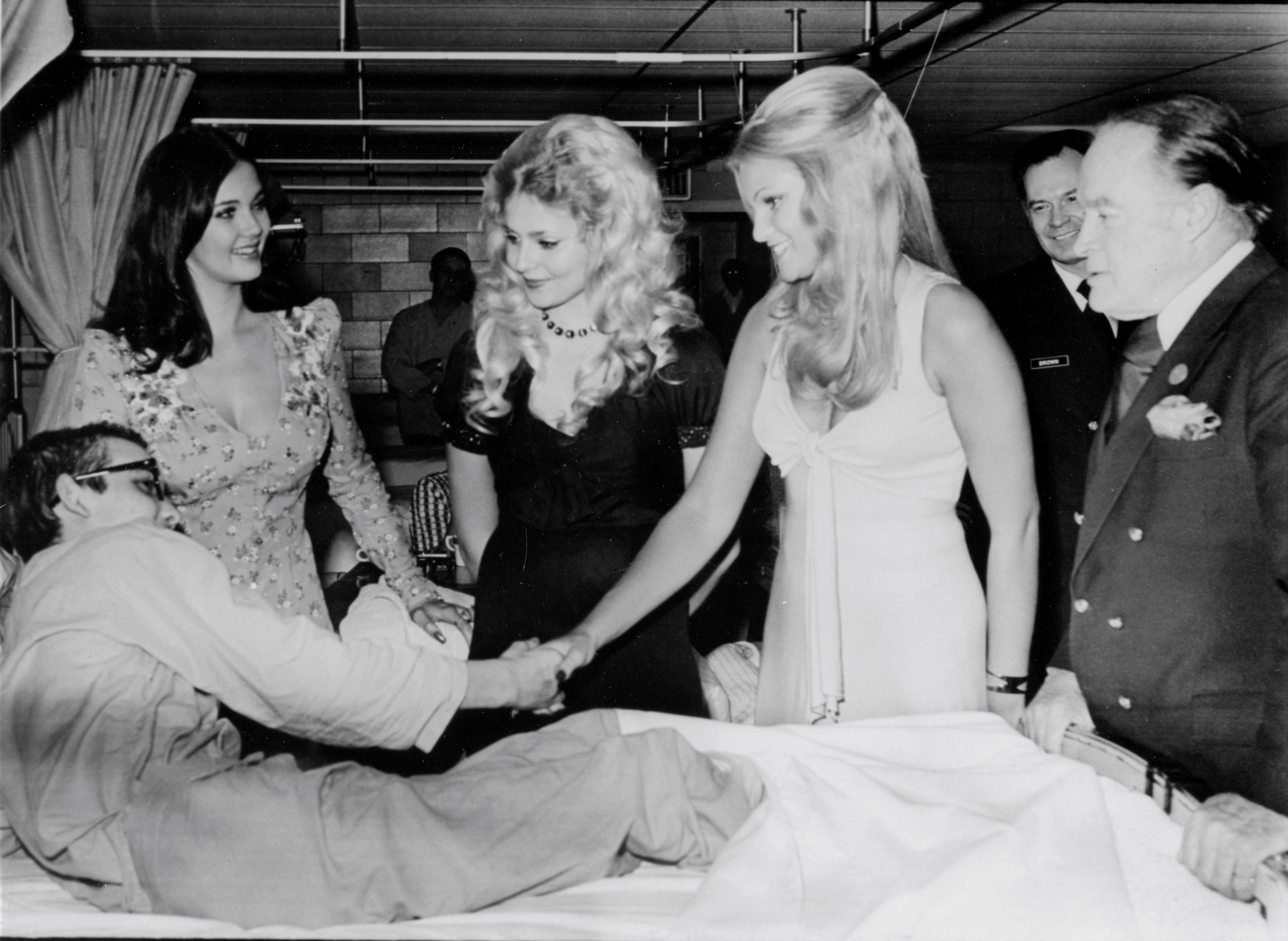
1972 Miss World - Miss USA Lynda Carter; Miss San Diego, Priscilla Barnes; and Miss Maryland, Betty Jo Grove spread Christmas cheer with Bob Hope at the National Naval Medical Center, Bethesda, MD.

Barnes' first break came when Bob Hope saw her in a local fashion show and invited her to join his troupe for a 1973 performance at Walter Reed Army Medical Center in Washington, D.C. She subsequently moved to Los Angeles to pursue a career in show business. She appeared as an Amazon in The New Adventures of Wonder Woman alongside Lynda Carter as the title character. Her second break came at 19 when she met Peter Falk, who offered her a one-line part in an episode of Columbo. This led to a series of bit parts in films such as The Seniors (1978) and Delta Fox (1979).

While working as a hostess at a Hollywood nightclub, Barnes posed nude for the "Pet of the Month" photo layout in the March 1976 issue of Penthouse magazine under the pseudonym Joann Witty. Penthouse later wanted to republish the photos under Barnes' real name in 1982 after she had become famous for Three's Company. The issue was argued in court, as Penthouse wanted a judge to rule on the legality of publishing the pictures using Barnes' real name. The case involved a handwritten addendum to the standard model release contract that all models sign. When Penthouse lost the initial case, it appealed to the Ninth Circuit Court of Appeals. The appellate court mostly sided with Barnes and ruled that the handwritten addendum was legally binding, precluding Penthouse from republishing the photos using Barnes' real name.

In 1976, Barnes began studying acting with coach Sal Dano, whose students included Tom Selleck, Robert Hays and Catherine Bach. In 1978, she played a leading role in the CBS action series The American Girls, which was canceled after seven weeks. Subsequent parts included the horror film Tintorera and television series such as Starsky & Hutch, Vega$, Kojak, The Rockford Files and The Love Boat, as well as the 1978 TV version of The Time Machine and the 1979 television film A Vacation in Hell. In 1980, Barnes landed a supporting role in the romantic comedy film Sunday Lovers.

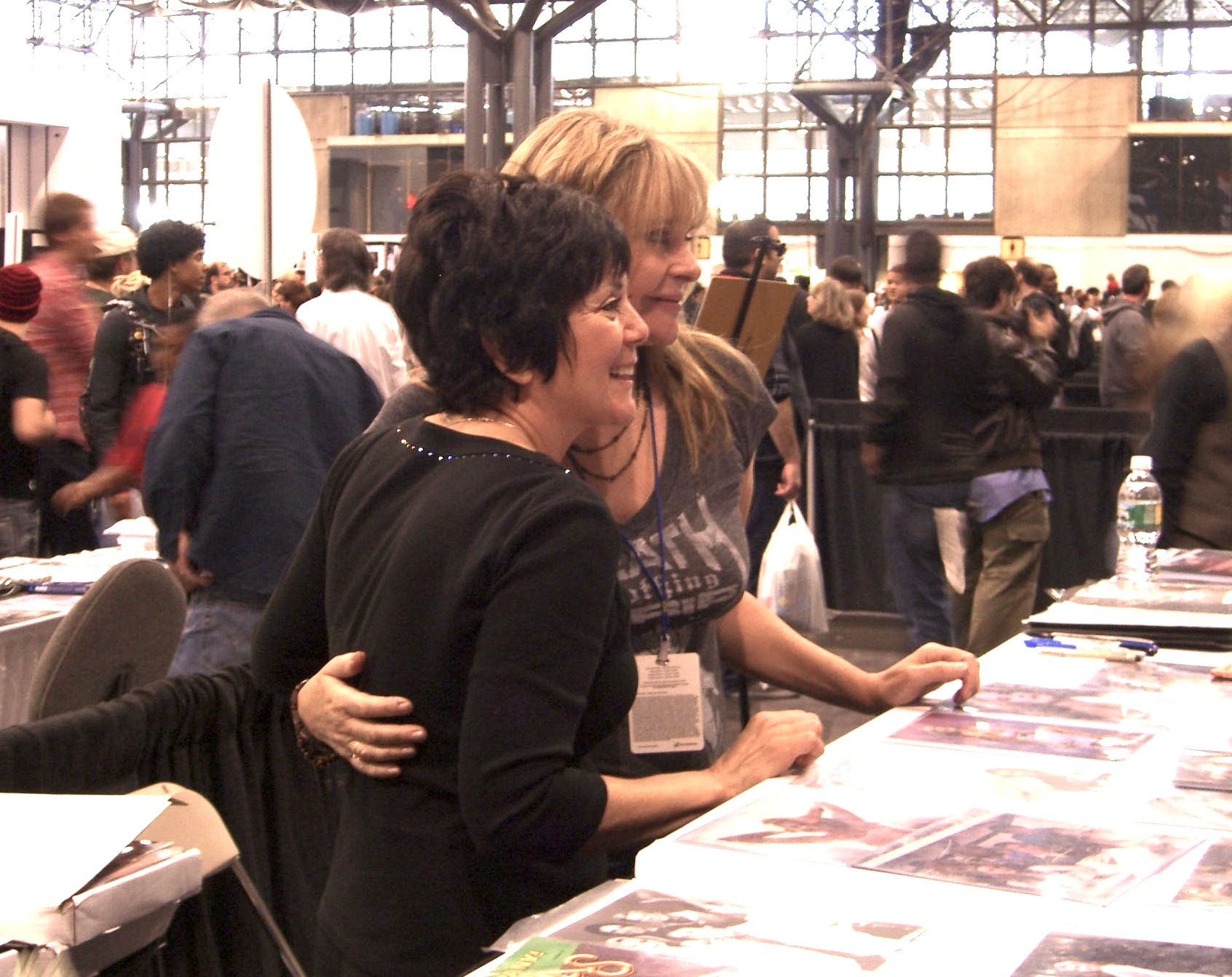
Barnes with Joyce DeWitt in 2010

=== Three's Company ===
In 1981, Barnes was cast as Terri Alden on the ABC sitcom Three's Company after Jenilee Harrison served as interim replacement to Suzanne Somers, who had left the series as a result of contractual dispute with producers. The part, which is Barnes' most notable role, brought her instant public recognition. Barnes initially auditioned for the role of Chrissy Snow in 1976 but lost the part to Somers. She stayed with the show through the series finale in 1984, appearing in a total of 70 episodes.

In the 1998 TV program E! True Hollywood Story, Barnes called Three's Company the "three worst years" of her life. She revealed that after shooting the first few episodes, she felt "uncomfortable" on the set, mostly because of tension among the cast members, and unsuccessfully petitioned the producers to release her from her contract. Barnes has retained her friendship with costars Joyce DeWitt and Richard Kline, with whom she has made public appearances. Barnes was portrayed by actress Anne Ross in the 2003 television movie Behind the Camera: The Unauthorized Story of Three's Company.

=== Later career ===
In 1982, Barnes starred in the Aaron Spelling made-for-television film The Wild Women of Chastity Gulch. After Three's Company was canceled by ABC in 1984, Barnes accepted guest-starring roles on television shows such as Hotel, Murder, She Wrote and Highway to Heaven. In 1987, she starred in the pilot for the sitcom She's the Sheriff, playing the title role. Barnes later left the project and was replaced by Suzanne Somers. The following year, Barnes returned in a starring role in the action comedy Traxx opposite Shadoe Stevens.

In 1989, Barnes appeared in the James Bond film Licence to Kill as Della Churchill and in the underwater sci-fi/action thriller Lords of the Deep. In 1992, she starred in the NBC television movie Perry Mason and the Case of the Reckless Romeo with Raymond Burr and in the horror film Stepfather III. In 1995, she appeared in the cult comedy film Mallrats and in The Crossing Guard with Jack Nicholson. Barnes made a cameo appearance in the 1999 comedy-drama film Mumford and appeared in many other smaller independent and made-for-television movies during 1990s and 2000s. She appeared in the 2005 horror film The Devil's Rejects, directed by Rob Zombie. and the films Thr3e (2006), The Visitation (2006) and American Cowslip (2009). In 2012, she costarred as Vicey Hatfield in Hatfields and McCoys: Bad Blood. In 2013, she appeared in Disaster Wars: Earthquake vs Tsunami. In 2007, Barnes appeared at the annual New York International Fringe Festival as Hillary Clinton in Nick Salamone's play Hillary Agonistes.

In 2014, Barnes was cast in a recurring role as Magda Andel, the mother of Petra (played by Yael Grobglas), in the CW comedy-drama series Jane the Virgin. The series ended in 2019 after five seasons. Barnes appeared in a total of 41 episodes. In 2019, Barnes appeared in the Bloomington Playwrights Project's production of Christy Hall's To Quiet the Quiet.

== Personal life ==
Barnes married actor Ted Monte in 2003.

== Filmography ==
=== Film ===
Year	Title	Role	Notes
1977	Tintorera	Girl From Bar	
1977	Beyond Reason	Leslie Valentine	
1978	Texas Detour	Claudia Hunter	
1978	The Seniors	Sylvia	
1979	Delta Fox	Karen	
1980	The Last Married Couple in America	Helena Dryden	
1980	Sunday Lovers	Donna	Segment: "Skippy"
1988	Traxx	Mayor Alexandra Cray	
1989	Lords of the Deep	Dr. Claire McDowell	
1989	Licence to Kill	Della Churchill Leiter	
1992	Body Trouble	Vera Vin Rouge	
1992	Stepfather III	Christine Davis	
1992	Talons of the Eagle	Cassandra	
1994	Erotique	Claire	Segment: "Taboo Parlor"
1994	May Jane	Sister Fong	
1995	The Crossing Guard	Verna	
1995	Mallrats	Ivannah	
1995	Witch Academy	Edith	
1997	Catherine's Grove	Sally Willows	
1998	The Killing Grounds	Della Desordo	
1998	Ava's Magical Adventure	Sarah	
1998	Divorce: A Contemporary Western	Chris	
1999	Implicated	Chloe	
1999	Hash Brown's	Lil Brown	
1999	Mumford	Landlady	
2001	Final Payback	Sharon Moreno	
2001	Alone with a Stranger	Claire Andrews	
2002	The Backlot Murders	Stephanie	Video
2003	Shrink Rap	Sheila	
2004	Unseen Evil 2	Sheila	Video
2005	The Devil's Rejects	Gloria Sullivan	
2005	Heart of the Beholder	Miss Olivia	
2005	Sex Sells: The Making of Touché	Roxy Free	
2006	The Visitation	Dee Henchle	
2006	Thr3e	Balinda Parson	
2007	Ed Gein: The Butcher of Plainfield	Vera 'Momma' Mason	Video
2008	Trailer Park of Terror	Jean	
2008	An American in China	Silvia Braddock	
2009	American Cowslip	Samantha	
2010	Kid Racer	Buddy	Video
2010	First Dog	June Angell	
2011	The A Plate	Candice Stevens	
2012	Hatfields and McCoys: Bad Blood	Vicey Hatfield	
2013	88 Miles to Moscow	Mom	Short film
2013	Disaster Wars: Earthquake vs. Tsunami	Vice President Taylor	
2013	Fat Planet	Jill Strong	
2014	Helen Alone	Mrs. Straub	
2015	Turkey	Sue	Short film
2017	Jonny's Sweet Revenge	'Stonewall' Rosie Callahan	

=== Television ===
Year	Title	Role	Notes
1976	Cannon	Linda	"Bloodlines"
1977	The Rockford Files	Lauren Ingeborg/Inga Lauren	"The Mayor's Committee from Deer Lick Falls"
1978	The American Girls	Rebecca Tomkins	Main role (11 episodes)
1978	Starsky & Hutch	Lisa Kendrick	"Foxy Lady"
1978	Kojak	Sally Addison/Vicki Addison	"60 Miles to Hell"
1978	The Love Boat	Jeanette Arnold	"Winner Take Love/The Congressman Was Indiscreet/Isaac's History Lesson"
1978	The Time Machine	Weena	TV film
1979	A Vacation in Hell	Denise	TV film
1980	Taxi	Tawny	"Fantasy Borough: Part 2"
1980	Vega$	Pam/Satin	"Love Affair"
1981	Scruples	Melanie	TV miniseries
1981–1984	Three's Company	Terri Alden	Regular role (72 episodes)
1982	The Love Boat	Britta Sorenson	"Getting to Know You: Parts 1 & 2"
1982	The Wild Women of Chastity Gulch	Maggie McCulloch	TV film
1984	Hotel	Elayne Grayson	"Final Chapters"
1985	The Love Boat	Helga Bjorsson	"Mr. Smith Goes to Stockholm: Parts 1 & 2"
1985	Murder, She Wrote	Vicky Gallegos	"Dead Heat"
1986	Blacke's Magic	Maryanne Thompson	"The Revenge of the Esperanza"
1987	Hotel	Donna Shepherd	"Mixed Emotions"
1988	Perfect People	Amy	TV film
1989	Highway to Heaven	Mary Anders/Tawny Turner	"Summer Camp"
1991	The Letters from Moab	Lila	TV short
1992	Perry Mason: The Case of the Reckless Romeo	Brenda Kingsley	TV film
1992	Stepfather III	Christine Davis	TV film
1994	Time Trax	Veronica Barclay	"Happy Valley"
1994	Attack of the 5 Ft. 2 Women	Crystal	TV film
1995	Burke's Law	Christy Winters	"Who Killed the Toy Maker?"
1995	Singapore Sling: Old Flames	Frankie	TV film
1997	Total Security	Diane Richards	"One Wedding and a Funeral"
1997	Viper	Sheila Dunn	"Cold Warriors"
1998	The Cowboy and the Movie Star	Marlene Brighton	TV film
2000	The Invisible Man	Liz Morgan	"Liberty and Larceny"
2002	For the People	Patricia Franklin	"Pilot"
2002	She Spies	Warden Stoop	"Perilyzed"
2010	Elevator Girl	Elaine Schuster	TV film
2012	Low Lifes	Mary	TV film
2014–2019	Jane the Virgin	Magda Andel	Recurring role (41 episodes)
2015	Break a Hip	Sabrina Klinefelter	"The Class"
2015	NCIS	Mrs. Skalbe	"Lockdown"
2017	The Minutes Collection	Ms. Marshall	"Cory Comes to Christmas"
