= Just Being Honest =

Live album by Craig Ferguson
- Released: September 10, 2015
- Recorded: March 7, 2015; The Town Hall in New York City
- Genre: Comedy
- Length: 75 minutes
- Labels: New Wave Entertainment Television; Distributed by Epix
- Producers: Craig Ferguson; Phil Cottone

Craig Ferguson chronology
I'm Here to Help (2013)	Just Being Honest (2015)	Craig Ferguson: Tickle Fight (2017)

Just Being Honest is the sixth comedy album by Craig Ferguson.

== Summary ==
Ferguson described the special as containing "the pros and cons of catch phrases, shoes that look like feet, and the Scottish version of hacky sack, as well as religion, aging, and sex, drugs and rock and roll." On the latter, Just Being Honest had an extended comedic take on his time writing a screenplay for Mick Jagger, which involved joining Jagger's band The Rolling Stones on the Bridges to Babylon Tour.

== Release and reception ==
Just Being Honest premiered on Epix on September 10, 2015.

In a review of Just Being Honest for Paste, Robert Ham said that it was "as shaggy and unkempt" as Ferguson's previous comedic work, including his time at The Late Late Show. Ham added that the album featured Ferguson being "distracted by the audience, the shoddy spotlight operator, and his own wandering mind" but that "his Scottish charm and wiggly body keep you rapt and giggling and skipping behind his every twist and turn."

== Award and nominations ==
The album was nominated for Best Comedy Album in the 58th Grammy Awards.
