= Sunday Lovers =

- Directed by: Bryan Forbes; Édouard Molinaro; Gene Wilder; Dino Risi
- Written by: Leslie Bricusse segment "An Englishman's Home"; Agenore Incrocci segment "Armando's Notebook"; Furio Scarpelli segment "Armando's Notebook"; Francis Veber segment "The French Method"; Gene Wilder segment "Skippy"
- Produced by: Leo L. Fuchs
- Starring: Gene Wilder; Roger Moore; Ugo Tognazzi; Lino Ventura; Kathleen Quinlan; Lynn Redgrave
- Cinematography: Gerald Hirschfeld
- Edited by: Alberto Gallitti
- Music by: Manuel De Sica
- Production company: Metro-Goldwyn-Mayer
- Distributed by: United Artists (United States/Canada); Cinema International Corporation (International)
- Release date: October 31, 1980
- Running time: 125 minutes
- Language: English
- Box office: $621,235

Sunday Lovers is a 1980 internationally co-produced romantic comedy film directed by Bryan Forbes, Gene Wilder, Dino Risi and Édouard Molinaro. It stars Roger Moore, Gene Wilder, Priscilla Barnes, Lynn Redgrave, Denholm Elliott and Kathleen Quinlan. It is split into four segments, each from a different country (Britain, France, the United States and Italy). The film was released in Italy in October 1980 and in America in early 1981 by Metro-Goldwyn-Mayer and United Artists.

== Cast ==
- Roger Moore...Harry Lindon (segment "An Englishman's Home")
- Lino Ventura...François Quérole (segment "The French Method")
- Priscilla Barnes...Donna (segment "An Englishman's Home")
- Gene Wilder...Skippy (segment "Skippy")
- Lynn Redgrave...Lady Davina (segment "An Englishman's Home")
- Kathleen Quinlan...Laurie (segment "Skippy")
- Ugo Tognazzi...Armando (segment "Armando's Notebook")
- Catherine Salviat...Christine (segment "The French Method")
- Liù Bosisio...Anna (segment "Armando's Notebook")
- Denholm Elliott...Parker (segment "An Englishman's Home")
- Sylva Koscina...Zaira (segment "Armando's Notebook")
- Beba Lončar...Marisa (segment "Armando's Notebook")
- Rossana Podestà...Clara (segment "Armando's Notebook")
- Milena Vukotic...Nora (segment "Armando's Notebook")
- Robert Webber...Henry Morrison (segment "The French Method")
- George Hillsden...(segment "An Englishman's Home")
- Adelita Requena...(segment "The French Method")
- Tommy Duggan...(segment "Skippy")
- Pierre Douglas...Levègue (segment "The French Method")
- Michèle Montel...Michèle Perrin (segment "The French Method")
- Madeleine Barbulée...Mamie (segment "The French Method")
- Gino Da Ronch...(segment "Armando's Notebook")
- Lory Del Santo...(segment "Armando's Notebook") (as Loredana Del Santo)
- Gianfilippo Carcano...(segment "Armando's Notebook")
- Vittorio Zarfati...(segment "Armando's Notebook")
- María Teresa Lombardo...(segment "Armando's Notebook")
- Dianne Crittenden...Maggie (segment "Skippy")
- Luis Ávalos...(segment "Skippy")
- Randolph Dobbs...(segment "Skippy")
- Catherine Spaak...Carletta, the psychoanalyst (segment "Armando's Notebook")
- Francesco D'Adda...Husband of Woman Next Door (segment "Armando's Notebook") (uncredited)

== See also ==
- List of American films of 1980
