= Traxx (film) =

1988 film

- VHS cover
- Directed by: Jerome Gary
- Written by: Gary DeVore
- Produced by: Gary DeVore; Richard McWhorter
- Starring: Shadoe Stevens; Priscilla Barnes; Willard E. Pugh; Robert Davi
- Cinematography: Giuseppe Maccari
- Edited by: Michael Kahane
- Music by: Jay Gruska
- Distributed by: De Laurentiis Entertainment Group
- Release date: August 17, 1988
- Running time: 84 minutes
- Country: United States
- Language: English
- Budget: $6.5 million

Traxx is a 1988 action comedy and adventure comedy film that was directed by Jerome Gary. It was released on August 17, 1988, and starred Shadoe Stevens as a mercenary turned cookie maker. The film had a budget of 6.5 million dollars and was initially intended to have a theatrical release, but was instead released direct to video. Traxx was later screened in 2012 at the Hollywood Theatre in Portland, Oregon.

In the film, a Texas State Trooper is fired for excessive use of force. He spends the next few years as a mercenary, before deciding to change his career path and work as a gourmet cook in his hometown in Texas. Needing funds for this, he starts working as a contract killer for the local mayor and the local police chief. His job is to kill his hometown's criminals.

== Plot ==
Opening in 1984, Traxx is a Texas State Trooper who has little respect for the rules of the police force due to perps frequently getting away with their crimes through legal technicalities or playing the "temporary insanity" case in court. As a result, Traxx makes every effort possible to kill criminals after catching them in the act which earns him scorn from his superiors.

In the opening scene, Traxx is one of several troopers called to defuse a hostage situation where a deranged holdup man has taken refuge in a pet store after shooting and killing an old lady and a puppy. Traxx storms the store and when the killer gives up and vows to plead temporary insanity, Traxx shoots and kills him anyway. After being reprimanded one too many times by the police commissioner for excessive use of force, Traxx quits and leaves town to become a soldier of fortune.

Four years later, after battling his way through El Salvador, the Middle East, and Nicaragua and killing countless terrorists, Traxx decides to retire to a life of baking gourmet cookies in his hometown, inspired by the cookies of Wally Amos (who late in the film appears in a cameo playing himself). When he finds himself in need of money, Traxx decides to hire himself out as the "Town Tamer" and begins cleaning up his hometown of Hadleyville, Texas, by killing off its lowlife street scum, aided by fellow mercenary Deeter.

Traxx is supported in his mercenary efforts by the amorous town mayor Alexandra Cray, who continuously tries to have sex with Traxx, and Hadleyville police chief Decker, who agrees to pay Traxx an off the books sum of $10,000 per week to clean up their town. Traxx does well with his new assassin-for-hire business, however, things do not go as smoothly as he would have hoped. Traxx's actions soon come to the attention of the local crime boss Aldo Palucci. Fearing that Traxx will bring about the downfall of his business, Palucci initially tries to bribe Traxx. When that doesn't work, and his own men are unable to kill him, he hires the dreaded Guzik brothers, a trio of ruthless but comic hitmen from Mexico to get rid of Traxx, which leads to a climactic showdown in the streets.

In the final scene, after Palucci accidentally blows himself up when he lights a cigar in his car after letting out a long and disgusting fart as a criticism of Traxx's cookies, Traxx defeats the three Guzik brothers and finally opens up his own cookie store called Snaxx by Traxx, using the reward money given for the bounty on the bad guys heads. Mayor Cray throws a large street fair to celebrate the town's centennial and its now crime-free streets.

== Cast ==
- Shadoe Stevens as Traxx
- Priscilla Barnes as Mayor Alexandria Cray
- Willard E. Pugh as Deeter
- Robert Davi as Aldo Palucci
- John Hancock as Chief Emmett Decker
- Hugh Gillin as Commissioner R.B. Davis
- Michael Kirk as Deputy Mayhew
- Raymond O'Connor as Tibbs
- Herschel Sparber as Guzik #1
- Jonathan Lutz as Guzik #2
- Lucius Houghton as Guzik #3
- Darrow Igus as Wendell
- Arlene Lorre as Celeste
- Rick Overton as Frank Williams
- Robert Miano as Arturo
- Steve Boles as Lonnie
- J. Michael Hunter as Matt
- Leon Rippy as The Killer in pet store
- Darrow Igus as Wendell
- Arlene Lorre as Celeste
- Wally Amos as Famous Amos
- Wallace Merck as Jerome
- Jerry Colker as Kent

== Reception ==
In his book '80s Action Movies on the Cheap, Daniel R. Budnik wrote that the film is "sort of a parody but not quite" of 1980s action film excess. Budnik compared it to Sledge Hammer!, saying that audiences may have misinterpreted the film and been offended by the over-the-top violence.

In a 2025 interview with RedLetterMedia, in their episode Best of the Worst: Terror Squad, Back from Hell, and Traxx, Shadoe Stevens denounced the film, calling it "so stupid", and claiming that the "really funny" script had been changed drastically in pre-production. He recalled producer Dino De Laurentis believing "it was going to be the next Crocodile Dundee." Upon filming a deleted gag where the Guzik brothers are executed in three differently colored electric chairs, Stevens allegedly wrote in his journal, "We are fucked." Despite these criticisms by Stevens the RedLetterMedia panel picked Traxx to be its best of the worst for that episode.
