= Join or Die with Craig Ferguson =

- Presented by: Craig Ferguson
- Narrated by: Shadoe Stevens
- Country of origin: United States
- Original language: English
- No. of seasons: 1
- No. of episodes: 22

Production
- Executive producers: Craig Ferguson; Phil Cottone; Brian Volk-Weiss; Jim Biederman; Tim Healy; Matt Ginsburg; Paul Cabana
- Production locations: Los Angeles, California
- Running time: 30 minutes
- Production companies: Comedy Dynamics; Green Mountain West; Lionsgate Television

Original release
- Network: History
- Release: February 18 – July 28, 2016

Join or Die with Craig Ferguson is an American panel show hosted by Scottish-American comedian Craig Ferguson. The sole season, consisting of 22 episodes, began airing on History on February 18, 2016. The show features Ferguson and a panel of special guests including comedians, actors and academics discussing unorthodox and provocative historical topics.

The title of the show refers to the well-known 1754 political cartoon of the same name, which was created by Benjamin Franklin and became a symbol of colonial freedom during the American Revolutionary War. Ferguson also got the cartoon tattooed on his arm when he became an American citizen.

== Production ==
Individual episodes cover topics such as bad medical ideas, worst political blunder, most influential drug, most influential band, greatest Founding Father, and history's biggest frenemies. Ferguson and a three-guest panel (usually consisting of scholars, comedians and people who Ferguson "talked to, liked, and respected" during his time as host of The Late Late Show with Craig Ferguson) conduct a humorous discussion about six candidates for the title in question. Viewers are invited to vote for their top choice on Twitter, and once the panel has narrowed the field from six candidates to two, the studio audience decides the winner by majority vote.

Each episode starts with a humorous monologue by Ferguson; the first 13 episodes also end with a more contemplative one in which he relaxes on the set with his suit jacket, vest, and tie removed.

During the February 24, 2016 episode of the online show Larry King Now, Ferguson told host Larry King that 22 episodes of Join or Die had already been produced. He added that the History Channel had placed an order for additional episodes. However, on March 31, 2017, during an episode of Ferguson's new Sirius XM radio show on which King was a guest, he stated that the show had been cancelled.

The final episode of the season, "History's Biggest Douchebag", was scheduled for June 16, 2016, but it was removed from the day's schedule. "History's Biggest Douchebag" aired July 28, 2016 on History Canada.

== Episodes ==
No.	Title	Guest(s)	Original release date	US viewers (millions)
1	"History's Biggest Political Blunder"	Jimmy Kimmel, Jen D'Angelo and Howard Bragman	February 18, 2016	0.72
Biggest Political Blunder Shortlist: Rod Blagojevich; Larry Craig; Herman Cain; Christine O'Donnell; Eliot Spitzer (winner); Dick Cheney
2	"History's Worst Medical Advice"	Chris Hardwick, Jordan Carlos and Bob Pflugfelder	February 18, 2016	0.43
Worst Medical Advice Shortlist: Smoking; Pulling Teeth; Bloodletting; Mercury; Lobotomies (winner); Urine
3	"History's Biggest Frenemies"	Courteney Cox, Dan Soder and Michael Ian Black	February 25, 2016	N/A
Biggest Frenemies Shortlist: Magic Johnson and Larry Bird; Steve Jobs and Bill Gates (winner); John Lennon and Paul McCartney; Thomas Edison and Nikola Tesla; Thomas Jefferson and John Adams; David Letterman and Jay Leno
4	"History's Most Doomed Presidential Campaign"	Dan Schnur, Bryan Callen and Elijah Wood	March 3, 2016	N/A
Most Doomed Presidential Campaign Shortlist: Gary Hart; Howard Dean; Michael Dukakis; John McCain; Al Gore; Mitt Romney (winner)
5	"History's Worst Tyrant"	Julie Bowen, Dan Levy and Laila Lalami	March 10, 2016	N/A
Worst Tyrant Shortlist: Adolf Hitler (winner); Genghis Khan; Pol Pot; Kim Jong-il; Muammar Gaddafi; Bloody Mary; Note: Ferguson states that Joseph Stalin was deliberately omitted from the list due to the sheer number of victims who died under his rule.
6	"History's Craziest Cult"	Jack Black, Tymberlee Hill and Stephen Prothero	March 17, 2016	N/A
Craziest Cult Shortlist: House of Yahweh; Rajneeshees; Cosmic People of Light Powers; The Brethren; Moonies; Jonestown (winner)
7	"History's Greatest Invention Since 1950"	Trace Adkins, Kate Flannery and Lori Greiner	March 24, 2016	N/A
Greatest Invention Since 1950 Shortlist: Internet (winner); Viagra; Microwave oven; Velcro; Personal computer; Jet airliner
8	"History's Most Influential Band"	Lars Ulrich, Tom Papa and Alan Light	March 31, 2016	N/A
Most Influential Band Shortlist: Nirvana; The Ramones; The Rolling Stones; Run-D.M.C.; Black Sabbath; The Beatles (winner)
9	"The Drug That Changed the World"	David Eisenbach, Maria Bello and Derek Waters	April 7, 2016	N/A
Drug That Changed the World Shortlist: Alcohol; Performance-enhancing drugs; Cocaine (winner); Marijuana; LSD; Caffeine
10	"History's Biggest Fall from Grace"	Jay Leno, Mark Forward and Howard Bragman	April 14, 2016	N/A
Biggest Fall from Grace Shortlist: Richard Nixon; Jim and Tammy Faye Bakker; O. J. Simpson; Benedict Arnold; Andrew Johnson; Bill Cosby (winner)
11	"History's Greatest Man-Made Structure"	Adam Goldberg, Noel Wells and Ty Pennington	April 21, 2016	N/A
Greatest Man-Made Structure Shortlist: Brooklyn Bridge; Empire State Building; Eiffel Tower; Pyramid of Giza (winner); Hoover Dam; Great Wall of China
12	"History's Most Plausible Conspiracy Theory"	Judd Apatow, Kurt Braunohler and Mike Massimino	April 28, 2016	N/A
Most Plausible Conspiracy Theory Shortlist: The Illuminati; Area 51; Hollow Earth; Fort Knox; Fake Moon Landing; Who Killed JFK? (winner)
13	"History's Biggest Presidential Bad Boy"	Angela Kinsey, Heather McDonald and Joel Stein	May 5, 2016	N/A
Biggest Presidential Bad Boy Shortlist: Andrew Jackson (winner); Bill Clinton; Warren G. Harding; John F. Kennedy; Thomas Jefferson; Richard Nixon
14	"History's Dumbest Mistake"	Dan Riskin, Ian Abramson and Tim Meadows	May 12, 2016	N/A
Dumbest Mistake Shortlist: Louisiana Purchase; Rejecting the Beatles; Trojan Horse (winner); Passing on Potter; No M&M's for E.T.; Selling Apple Early
15	"History's Biggest Unsolved Mystery"	Michael Ian Black, Josh Wolf and Jason Biggs	May 12, 2016	N/A
Biggest Unsolved Mystery Shortlist: D. B. Cooper; Black Dahlia; Zodiac Killer; Stonehenge (winner); Easter Island; Jack the Ripper
16	"History's Greatest Unexplained Phenomenon"	Mike Massimino, Megan Amram and Larry King	May 19, 2016	N/A
Greatest Unexplained Phenomenon Shortlist: Bermuda Triangle; Bigfoot; Amityville Horror; UFOs; Crop circles; Loch Ness Monster (winner)
17	"History's Greatest Gangster"	Derrick Pitts, Thomas Dale and Joel McHale	May 19, 2016	N/A
Greatest Gangster Shortlist: Lucky Luciano (winner); El Chapo; Pablo Escobar; Bugsy Siegel; Joseph Stalin; Al Capone
18	"History's Most Defiant Moments of the Last 75 Years"	John Avlon, Yvette Nicole Brown and Lisa Kudrow	May 26, 2016	N/A
Most Defiant Moments of the Last 75 Years Shortlist: Tiananmen Square; Edward Snowden; Rosa Parks (winner); Frank Serpico; Reagan at the Wall; Thich Quang Duc
19	"History's Best Founding Father"	Joel Stein, Jo Koy and Fred Willard	May 26, 2016	N/A
Best Founding Father Shortlist: George Washington (winner); James Madison; John Adams; Benjamin Franklin; Alexander Hamilton; Thomas Jefferson
20	"History's Biggest Fraud"	Joel Stein, Russell Peters and Michael Sheen	June 9, 2016	N/A
Biggest Fraud Shortlist: Charles Ponzi (winner); Frank Abagnale; Lance Armstrong; James Frey; Rachel Dolezal; Pete Rose
21	"History's Biggest Badass"	Evy Poumpouras, Mark Forward and Regis Philbin	June 9, 2016	N/A
Biggest Badass Shortlist: Theodore Roosevelt; George S. Patton; Crazy Horse; Joan of Arc; Harriet Tubman (winner); Martin Luther King Jr.
22	"History's Biggest Douchebag"	Kal Penn, Echo Kellum and Leonard Maltin	July 28, 2016	N/A
Biggest Douchebag Shortlist: Thomas Edison; Bernie Madoff; Anthony Weiner; Donald Trump; Marge Schott; Martin Shkreli (winner)
