= Stepfather III =

- Official VHS cover
- Genre: Horror film
- Written by: Guy Magar; Marc B. Ray
- Directed by: Guy Magar
- Starring: Robert Wightman; Priscilla Barnes; David Tom; Season Hubley; Christa Miller
- Music by: Pat Regan
- Country of origin: United States

Production
- Producers: Guy Magar; Paul Moen
- Production location: Simi Valley
- Cinematography: Alan Caso
- Editor: Patrick Gregson
- Running time: 110 minutes
- Production companies: Incorporated Television Company; Trimark Pictures
- Budget: $1.8 million

Original release
- Network: HBO
- Release: June 4, 1993

Related
- Stepfather II (1989)

Stepfather III (also known as Stepfather III: Father's Day) is a 1993 American horror film directed and written by Guy Magar. It stars Robert Wightman, Priscilla Barnes, David Tom, and Season Hubley. It is the sequel to the 1989 film Stepfather II, and the third installment in The Stepfather film series. The film follows a serial killer seeking out another family to become a part of, using plastic surgery to disguise himself from the authorities. Unlike the previous two installments, Stepfather III was released made-for-television and Terry O'Quinn does not star in the title role.

== Plot ==
After surviving being stabbed with a hammer at the church in Palm Meadows, Los Angeles at the end of the previous film, Jerry Blake escapes from the same institution in Puget Sound, Washington he was placed in 4 years ago. He seeks out a surgeon to alter his appearance using no anesthesia after a few days of healing. Jerry kills the doctor by slitting his throat with a saw and makes his way to Deer View, where he acquires an identity, Keith Grant as well as a cottage and a job at a nursery. Keith meets principal Christine Davis and her son Andy, who uses a wheelchair after an accident, although doctors believe his continued inability to walk is psychosomatic. Keith and Christine begin dating. A recent boyfriend of Christine who has been monitoring them approaches Keith at his house to warn him off. Keith kills him with a shovel and buries the body in his garden.

Keith and Christine marry, despite Andy's misgivings. Andy's father Steve offers Andy the chance to spend the summer with his family and attend a school for the gifted, and Andy decides to take his father up on the offer, despite Keith's protests. Keith begins courting Jennifer Ashley, planning to marry her after murdering Christine. Keith murders his boss with a rake when Thompson teases him about spotting Keith cheating on Christine with Jennifer. Keith returns home with an axe to kill Christine, but finds that Andy has returned and changes his mind. However, Keith calls Andy "Nicky" which puzzles Christine, though Keith gives her an explanation. Jennifer meets Christine while enrolling Nicky in school; Christine is struck by the name Nicky, coupled with Jennifer mentioning the remote road outside town she and Nicky have rented a house on, which Christine thinks might be Keith's former cottage, which he has sub leased. Keith stops by the school and sees them together and panics. Later, he denies knowing Jennifer.

Andy asks friend Father Ernest Brennan to help him discover Keith's past. Father Brennan agrees, as he knows Andy will try to do it alone if he doesn't. Andy invites Father Brennan to dinner, and sneaks Keith's fork off the table, which he passes to Father Brennan to have the fingerprints analyzed. Keith knows that Father Brennan saw him with Jennifer and Nicky, and has asked him some questions about his past, so he excuses himself after dinner and follows the priest home, running him off the road and making it look like an accident. He also discovers the fork.

Keith rushes to the nursery and calls Jennifer. Jennifer calls Christine to cancel their meeting. Keith reveals he is married before claiming he needs her out of the way. Keith knocks her unconscious and prepares to kill her by feeding her body into a chipper.

Christine and Andy appear. Christine has figured out that Keith is Jennifer's boyfriend and confronts him about the affair. He beats her unconscious when she discovers Jennifer writhing on the ground. Andy finds the courage to get out of his wheelchair and walk. Keith chases him through the nursery until Andy pushes him off the ladder which knocks him into the chipper. Keith is only hanging on the edge and grabs Andy. Christine gets up and helps Andy get away, while Keith, unable to escape, is torn to pieces by the chipper. Jennifer cuts the cable with a hatchet, shutting the chipper’s engine off. Jennifer sees the pieces of Keith in the chipper. Andy stands up and Christine is surprised and hugs him. Andy turns to look at the chipper. They then exit the garden.

== Cast ==
- Robert Wightman as Jerry Blake / Keith Grant / The Stepfather
- Priscilla Barnes as Christine Davis
- Season Hubley as Jennifer Ashley
- David Tom as Andy Davis
- John Ingle as Father Ernest Thomas Brennan
- Dennis Paladino as Mr. Thompson
- Stephen Mendel as Mark Wraynal
- Jay Acovone as Steve Davis
- Christa Miller as Beth Davis
- Mario Roccuzzo as Plastic Surgeon
- Joan Dareth as Bernice
- Jennifer Bassey as Dr. Brady
- Adam Ryen as Nicholas "Nicky" Ashley
- Mindy Ann Martin as Tiffany Davis
- Joel Carlson as Pete Davis
- Sumer Stamper as Maggie Davis
- Brenda Strong as Lauren Sutliffe
- Mort Lewis as Funeral Priest
- Adam Wylie as Easter Party Boy

== Production ==
After Stepfather II proved to be a success in overseas sales and Europe, ITC Entertainment felt confident enough to move forward on another installment. Guy Magar, who had served as a consultant on Stepfather II during post-production advising on the editing, was approached by Chris Gorog to develop a premise for a third film that accounted for replacing Terry O'Quinn as he reportedly declined to return as he didn't wish to be typecast as a homicidal maniac. Magar came up with the prologue that would involve The Stepfather getting plastic surgery as a way of explaining the recasting. Robert Wightman was cast as The Stepfather as he was the one who was best able to mimic O'Quinn's mannerisms. As there was no convincing way to explain how The Stepfather survived his death in Stepfather II, Magar just chose to ignore it.

=== Filming ===
For the opening scene in which Jerry Blake undergoes plastic surgery, director Guy Magar filmed an actual plastic surgery procedure, with no special effects used during the scene. The film was shot over the course of 25 days in Los Angeles with a budget of $1.8 million.

== Release ==
=== Home media ===
To date, the only DVD release of the film has been in Germany, where Marketing Film released it as a part of a 2003 limited edition box set containing all three films. It was also released in Germany separately. Elsewhere, the only home video release of the film is on VHS. No plans have been made to release it on DVD or Blu-ray in the United States.

== Reception ==
=== Critical response ===
Reviews of the film were varied, with Variety's Tony Scott stating "[The] film lurches on without much credibility" before going on to say "blood spurts, but director (and co-writer with Marc B. Ray) Guy Magar doesn't make the horror convincing. The simplistic story line and the unconvincing portrayal by Wightman haven't been enhanced by indifferent production values." Entertainment Weekly's Doug Brod gave the film a D+, referring to it as "a poorly scripted, all-too-familiar chiller", also calling Robert Wightman "robotic" and "a weak substitute for previous death-dealing dad Terry O'Quinn".

Time Out Film Guide stated that the film "is far better than one might expect" and called Wightman's performance "more barmy than ever" and "with that prissy, scary, whiny voice makes a good fist of it".
