= Shadoe Stevens =

American radio host (born 1946)

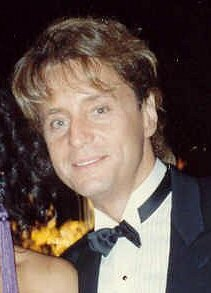
- Stevens at the 1989 Emmy Awards
- Born: Terry Ingstad; November 3, 1946 (age 79); Jamestown, North Dakota, U.S.
- Occupations: Radio host, voiceover actor, television personality
- Years active: 1957–present
- Spouses: Linda Stevens (m. 1967; div. 1979) Cynthia Gaydos (m. 1980; div. 1984) Beverly Cunningham (m. 1986)
- Children: 3, including Amber Stevens West
- Relatives: Andrew J. West (son-in-law)

Shadoe Stevens (born Terry Ingstad; November 3, 1946) is an American radio host, voiceover actor, and television personality. He was the host of American Top 40 from 1988 to 1995. He currently hosts the internationally syndicated radio show Top of the World, and co-hosts Mental Radio, an approach to UFOs and paranormal topics. He was co-founder and creator of Sammy Hagar's rock station "Cabo Wabo Radio" which broadcasts from the Cabo Wabo Cantina in Cabo San Lucas, Mexico. In television, he was the announcer for The Late Late Show with Craig Ferguson on CBS and, as of July 2015, serves as the primary continuity announcer for the Antenna TV network. His voice can also be heard as the voiceover for "G.O.D." in the Off-Broadway musical Altar Boyz. Stevens is also often heard on Hits & Favorites, calling in at least once a week to share wisdom with his brother Richard Stevens and their friend Lori St. James.

== Early life ==
Stevens was born in Jamestown, North Dakota. He first came to fame in 1957 when a Life magazine article about him, entitled "America's Youngest D.J.", featured a photo of Stevens broadcasting live over radio station KEYJ (now called KQDJ) in his hometown of Jamestown. The accompanying article extolled the fact that he had built his own working transmitter in the attic of his home the year before, using a "souped-up" wireless broadcasting kit with a hundred-foot antenna. It omitted, however, the additional information that the equipment and advice needed to build the transmitter had both been furnished by the staff engineers at KEYJ, which was owned by his father and uncle; his family continues to own many radio stations in North Dakota to this day, under the Ingstad Family Media group. He was later "discovered" in a "man on the street" interview by the station and was soon broadcasting a weekly rock show called Spin with Terry. During his high school years, he obtained a full-time shift at the station as a host of the Mister Midnight program, where he developed his now-famous "slow 'n low" style of speaking.

== College and early career ==
Stevens attended and graduated from the University of North Dakota, where he was a member of Sigma Nu fraternity. Majoring in Commercial Art and Radio/TV Journalism at the University of North Dakota and the University of Arizona, Stevens put himself through college working in radio at KILO in Grand Forks, North Dakota; KQWB in Fargo, North Dakota; and KIKX in Tucson, Arizona, where he quickly became the most popular DJ in town, under the on-air persona of "Jefferson K." Following college, he joined the Bill Drake-formatted station WRKO in Boston during the winter of 1968–69. At WRKO, he worked the early evening (6–9 p.m.) shift during the station's peak in popularity. In the spring of 1970, he moved to Southern California to another Drake outlet, KHJ, as one of the last true "Boss Jocks", where his big baritone and energetic enthusiasm soon gained a following.

Stevens later went on to become a radio personality and program director at KRLA in Los Angeles. Attaining status as a programmer, he was hired to make a success of KMET-FM and then to create the programming for a new radio format on a new Los Angeles station, KROQ-FM ("K-Rock"), where he remained for five years.

== 1970s and the rise to fame ==
During the late 1970s and early 1980s, Stevens gained an additional cult following when he created and produced "Fred R. Rated for Federated", a long-running series of offbeat television commercials for the Federated Group, a chain of home electronics retailers in the western and southwestern United States. These ads were so popular that they were the subject of a Time Magazine article, and led to a movie deal, television shows, and American Top 40. In 1978 and 1979, Stevens served as the off-camera announcer on the syndicated Disco music television show Hot City.

In 1984, Stevens entered an inpatient treatment facility to overcome his longtime drug addiction.

== Acting career ==
Stevens acted for the first time when he was coerced into auditioning for Arthur Miller's After the Fall at the University of Arizona. He not only won a role, he got the demanding lead of Quentin, who is virtually never off the stage. One local reviewer said, the young performer "commanded the stage with a commanding voice." He contributed several deadpan readings of absurd material for The Kentucky Fried Movie and then gained national recognition as the announcer for two incarnations of Hollywood Squares (the 1986–1989 and the first 4 seasons of the 1998–2004 version), appearing in the middle square of the bottom row and guest hosting for a week during the final season of the 1980s version, and guest-announcing during the second "Game Show Week" in the final season of the 1990s run. He also became known for playing Kenny Beckett on the sitcom Dave's World (1993–1997) and serving as announcer for the Fender Bender 500 segments of Wake, Rattle, and Roll. He appeared as himself on an episode of The Larry Sanders Show and also on Caroline in the City. In 1988, he starred in the film Traxx. In 1990, Stevens also starred as the title character on the TV series Max Monroe: Loose Cannon. In 1992, he made a small appearance in the comedy film Mr. Saturday Night. In 1996, he voiced Doc Samson in The Incredible Hulk.

In 1999, he had a cameo in a season 9 episode of Beverly Hills, 90210, playing Sonny Sharp, a former top radio DJ who befriends David Silver.

In late 2005, Stevens was hired to be The Late Late Show's announcer, a position he held until the end of March 2015 when the production contract with producer Worldwide Pants ran out at the end of a two-month interregnum of guest hosts. As part of an April Fool's Day hosting swap, Stevens announced for The Price Is Right with Craig Ferguson hosting while Drew Carey with his Price is Right announcer George Gray hosted The Late Late Show on April 1, 2014. Stevens continues to work with Ferguson as the announcer on the History Channel's Join or Die with Craig Ferguson, and as of February 2017 on The Craig Ferguson Show on SiriusXM radio.

In July 2015, Stevens became the primary continuity announcer for Tribune Media's television network Antenna TV, replacing Gary Owens, who died in February.

He is also the author of a series of children's books. The first, released in 2006, was called The Big Galoot.

== Personal life ==
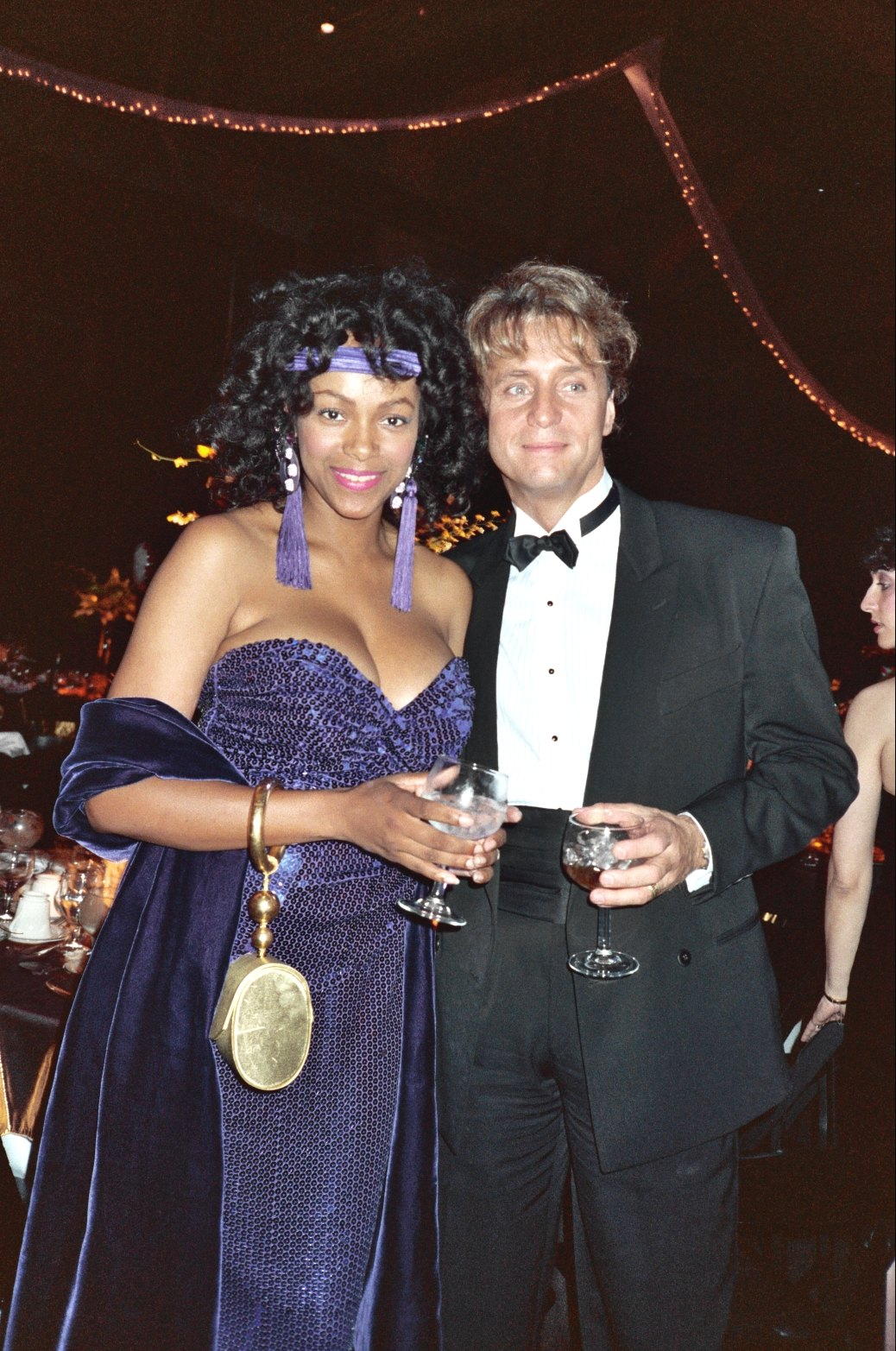
Stevens with his wife Beverly Cunningham at the 1989 Emmy Awards

Stevens married his first wife Linda in 1967 (divorced in 1979). He then married Cynthia Gaydos in 1980 (divorced in 1984). He has been married to fashion model Beverly Cunningham since 1986. Stevens has three children: one son, Brad, from his first marriage; and two daughters from his third marriage, Amber Stevens West (also an actress) and Chyna Rose.

Amber, appearing in the ABC Family series Greek, made an appearance on The Late Late Show with Craig Ferguson on July 27, 2007, with her father to promote the show. As a child, she also made a cameo appearance with her father on American Top 40 the weekend of December 24, 1988, as part of a Christmas skit.

Stevens' brother Richard, who occasionally filled in for him on the 1986–89 version of Hollywood Squares, is a disc jockey on Citadel Media's Hits & Favorites format.

== See also ==
- List of Sigma Nu brothers
