= Craig Ferguson =

Scottish and American comedian (born 1962)

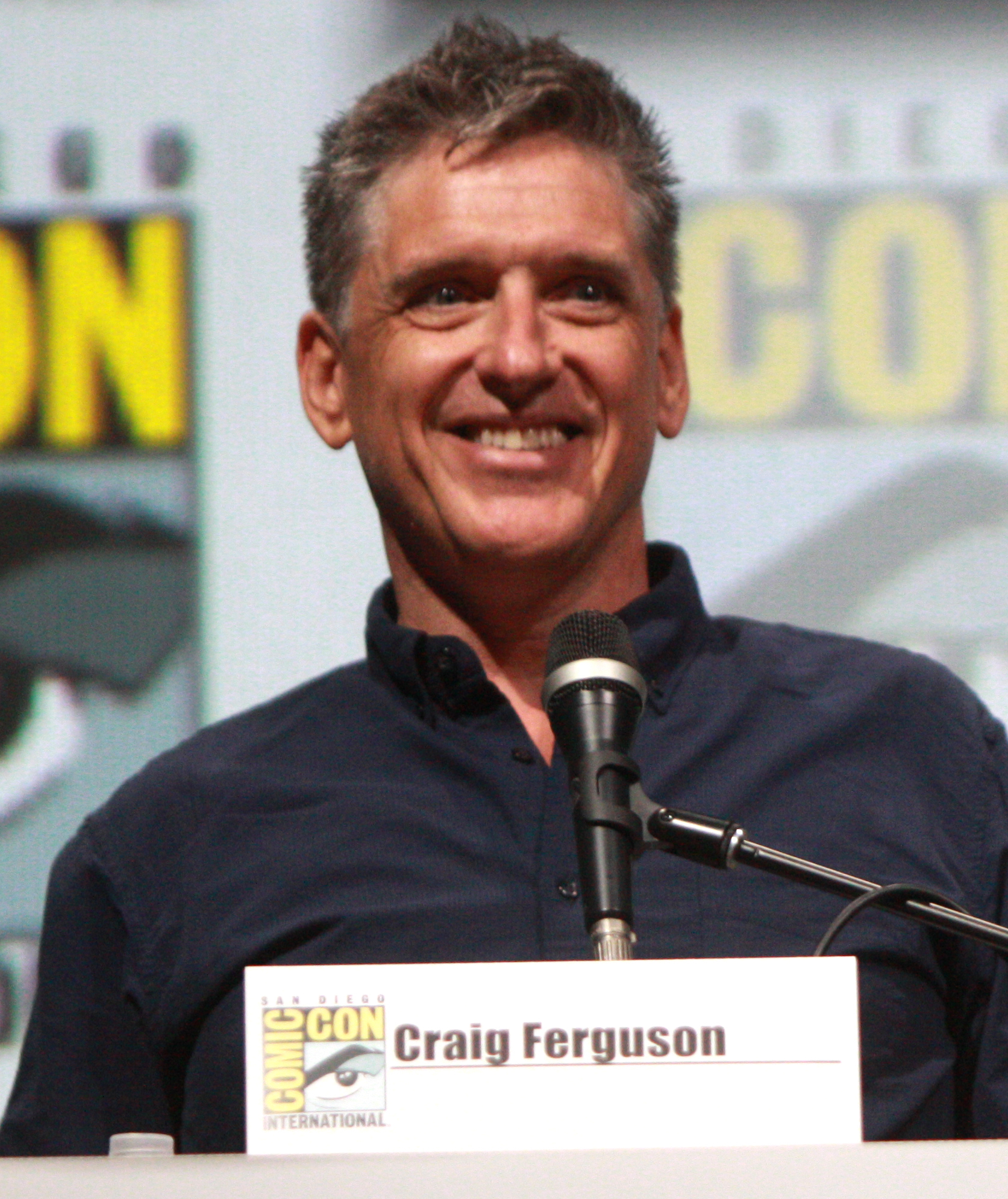
- Ferguson speaking at the 2013 San Diego Comic-Con
- Born: 17 May 1962 (age 64); Springburn, Glasgow, Scotland
- Citizenship: United Kingdom; United States (naturalised 2008)
- Occupations: Comedian; actor; writer; television host
- Years active: 1980–present
- Notable work: Nigel Wick on The Drew Carey Show; Host of The Late Late Show with Craig Ferguson
- Spouses: Anne Hogarth (m. 1983; div. 1986); Sascha Corwin (m. 1998; div. 2004); Megan Wallace-Cunningham (m. 2008)
- Children: 2
- Relatives: Lynn Ferguson (sister)

Comedy career
- Medium: Stand-up; television; film; music
- Genres: Observational comedy; improvisational comedy; surreal humour; blue comedy; deadpan; satire
- Subjects: Scottish culture; American politics; everyday life; pop culture; self-deprecation; current events
- Website: www.thecraigfergusonshow.com

Craig Ferguson (born 17 May 1962) is a Scottish and American actor, comedian, writer and television host. He hosted the CBS late-night talk show The Late Late Show with Craig Ferguson (2005–2014), for which he won a Peabody Award for his interview with South African archbishop Desmond Tutu in 2009. He is currently the host of Scrabble (2026–present) on The CW Network.

After leaving The Late Late Show in December 2014, he hosted the syndicated game show Celebrity Name Game (2014–2017), for which he won two Daytime Emmy Awards, and Join or Die with Craig Ferguson (2016) on History. In 2017, he released a six-episode web show with his wife, Megan Wallace Cunningham, titled Couple Thinkers. In 2021, he hosted The Hustler, a television game show that aired on ABC from 4 January to 23 September 2021. In August 2023, Ferguson began broadcasting his own podcast Joy on iHeartMedia.

After starting his career in the United Kingdom with music, comedy, and theatre, Ferguson moved to the United States, where he appeared in the role of Nigel Wick on the ABC sitcom The Drew Carey Show (1996–2004). Ferguson has written three books: Between the Bridge and the River, a novel; American on Purpose (2009), a memoir; and Riding the Elephant: A Memoir of Altercations, Humiliations, Hallucinations & Observations (2019). He has written and starred in three films, directing one of them, and has appeared in several others. In animated film, Ferguson voiced Gobber in the How to Train Your Dragon film series (2010–2019), Owl in Winnie the Pooh (2011), and Lord Macintosh in Brave (2012).

== Early life and education ==
Ferguson was born on 17 May 1962 in Stobhill Hospital in the Springburn district of Glasgow, to Robert (1930–2006), a post office worker and Scottish Nationalist, and Janet (née Ingram) Ferguson (1933–2008), a primary school teacher. When he was six months old, he and his family moved from their Springburn flat to a Development Corporation house in the nearby New Town of Cumbernauld, where he grew up "chubby and bullied". They lived there as Cumbernauld was rehousing many Glaswegians away from the poor housing conditions and damage to the city from World War II.

Ferguson attended Muirfield Primary School and Cumbernauld High School. At age 16, Ferguson left high school and began an apprenticeship to be an electronics technician at a local factory of American company Burroughs Corporation. Ferguson has two sisters (one older and one younger) and one older brother. His younger sister, Lynn Ferguson Tweddle, is also a comedian, presenter and actress, who voiced Mac in the 2000 stop-motion animation film Chicken Run. She was a writer on The Late Late Show until July 2011.

His first visit to the United States was in 1975, when he was 13, to visit an uncle who lived on Long Island, near New York City. When he moved to New York City in 1983, he worked in construction in Harlem. He was later a bouncer at the nightclub Save the Robots before returning to the United Kingdom.

== Career ==
=== British career ===
Ferguson's entertainment career began as a teenager, drumming for Glasgow punk bands such as the Night Creatures and Exposure. He then had a brief stint as a drummer for the post-punk band Ana Hausen, which released a single for Human Records in 1981. Following that, he joined punk band The Bastards from Hell, later renamed the Dreamboys, and fronted by future actor Peter Capaldi. They performed regularly in Glasgow from 1980 to 1982. Ferguson credits Capaldi for inspiring him to try comedy. When Ferguson was 18, he worked as a session musician and performed as a drummer for Nico during a few gigs when she toured Scotland.

After a nerve-wracking first comedy appearance, he decided to create a character he described as a "parody of all the über-patriotic native folk singers who seemed to infect every public performance in Scotland," using the name "Bing Hitler" borrowed from Peter Capaldi. Ferguson first performed as the character in Glasgow, and was subsequently a hit at the 1986 Edinburgh Festival Fringe. However, by the end of the year, Ferguson was already discussing his intention to retire Bing. At the press launch for an alternative pantomime of "Sleeping Beauty" (which he co-wrote with Capaldi), he said, "You can't write for just one character forever." A recording of his act as Bing Hitler was made at Glasgow's Tron Theatre and released in the 1980s; a Bing Hitler monologue ("A Lecture for Burns Night") appears on the compilation cassette Honey at the Core.

After enjoying success at the Edinburgh International Festival, Ferguson appeared on television as 'Confidence' in Red Dwarf, on STV's Hogmanay Shows, and on the 1993 One Foot in the Grave Christmas special One Foot in the Algarve. In 1990, a pilot of The Craig Ferguson Show, a one-off comedy pilot for Granada Television, was broadcast, co-starring Paul Whitehouse and Helen Atkinson-Wood. In 1991, Channel 4 asked him to host Friday at the Dome, a 75-minute live music show. In 1992, he was given his own BBC Scotland show, 2000 Not Out. In 1993, he presented a six-part archaeology TV series, The Dirt Detective, for STV, and was given a six-part TV series on BBC One, The Ferguson Theory, a mix of stand-up and sketches recorded the day before transmission.

Ferguson also found success in musical theatre. Beginning in 1991, he appeared on stage as Brad Majors in the London production of The Rocky Horror Show. In 1994, he played Father MacLean in production of Bad Boy Johnny and the Prophets of Doom at the Union Chapel in London. That year he appeared again at the Edinburgh Fringe, as Oscar Madison in The Odd Couple. After living and working in the United States for many years, in 2017, it was announced that he would return to UK television for the first time in 25 years, in a guest role as Callum Coburn in BBC Scotland's comedy Still Game, which was broadcast in 2018. In 2022, an adaptation of Ferguson's film Saving Grace (2000) was announced as a stage musical aimed for a 2023 run in West End, in which Ferguson will portray a "villainous banker". It was adapted by April De Angelis from Ferguson's and Mark Crowdy's screenplay, with music by KT Tunstall.

=== American career ===
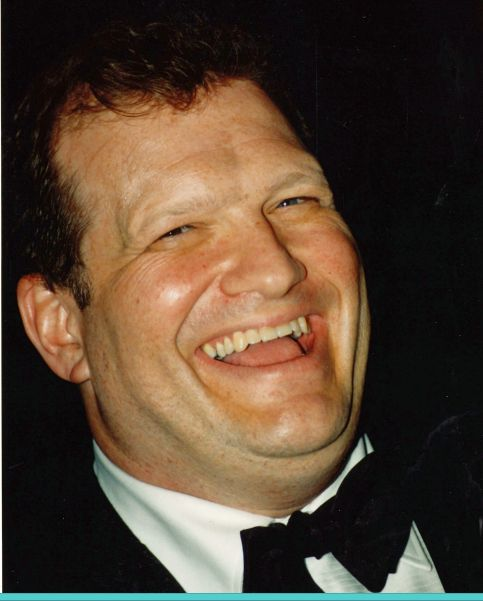
Ferguson's breakthrough in the United States came by working with Drew Carey (pictured) on The Drew Carey Show (1996–2003)

Ferguson moved to Los Angeles in November 1994, after his soon-to-be agent Rick Siegel had seen Ferguson during the Edinburgh Festival and suggested that he come to America. His first American role was as baker Logan McDonough on the short-lived 1995 ABC comedy Maybe This Time, which starred Betty White and Marie Osmond.

His breakthrough in the United States came when he was cast on The Drew Carey Show as the title character's boss, Mr. Wick, a role he played from 1996 to 2003. He played the role with an over-the-top posh English accent, explaining it was "to make up for generations of English actors doing crap Scottish accents." In his comedy special "A Wee Bit o' Revolution", he specifically identified James Doohan's portrayal of Montgomery Scott on Star Trek as the foundation of his "revenge". (At the end of one episode, though, Ferguson broke the fourth wall and began talking to the audience at home in his normal Scottish accent.) His character was memorable for his unique methods of laying employees off, almost always "firing Johnson", the most common last name of the to-be-fired workers. After leaving the show in 2003, he remained a recurring character on the series for the last two seasons, and was part of the two-part series finale in 2004.

During the production of The Drew Carey Show, Ferguson devoted his off-time as a cast member to writing, working in his trailer on set in between shooting his scenes. He wrote and starred in three films: The Big Tease, Saving Grace, and I'll Be There; he also directed the latter, for which he won the Audience Award for Best Film at the Aspen, Dallas, and Valencia film festivals. He was named Best New Director at the Napa Valley Film Festival. These were among other scripts that, "in the great tradition of the movie business, about half a dozen that I got paid a fortune for but never got made."

His other acting credits in films include Niagara Motel, Lenny the Wonder Dog, Lemony Snicket's A Series of Unfortunate Events, Chain of Fools, Born Romantic, The Ugly Truth, Kick-Ass, and, as a voice-over actor, How to Train Your Dragon, How to Train Your Dragon 2, Brave, and Winnie the Pooh.

Ferguson has been touring the United States and Canada with a comedy show since the late 2000s, including a performance at Carnegie Hall on 23 October 2010 and a performance at Radio City Music Hall on 6 October 2012. He has performed two stand-up television specials on Comedy Central, both released on DVD: A Wee Bit o' Revolution in 2009 and Does This Need to Be Said? in 2011. His third comedy special, I'm Here to Help, was released on Netflix in 2013, garnering positive reviews of 4 out of 5 stars on Netflix and peaking at number 6 on Billboard top comedy albums. It also received a 2014 Grammy Award nomination for Best Comedy Album.

Ferguson was awarded the Peter Ustinov Comedy Award by the Banff World Media Festival on 11 June 2013.

==== The Late Late Show ====
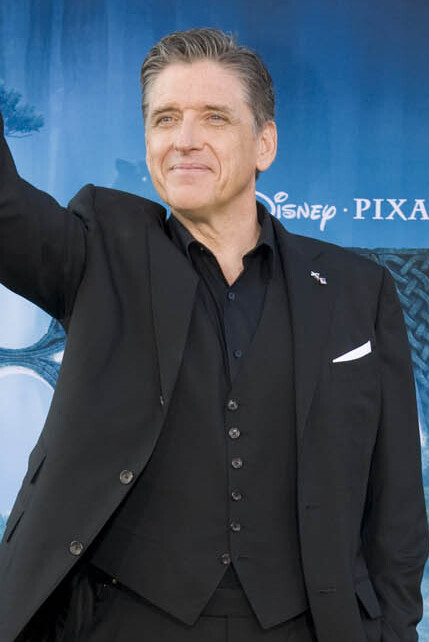
Ferguson at the premiere of Brave at the Dolby Theatre in Los Angeles, June 2012

In December 2004, it was announced that Ferguson would succeed Craig Kilborn on CBS's The Late Late Show. His first show as the regular host aired on 3 January 2005. The show was unique in that it had no "human" sidekicks such as Ed McMahon on The Tonight Show Starring Johnny Carson or Conan O'Brien's Andy Richter. Beginning in 2010, a robotic skeleton named Geoff Peterson and two silent performers in a pantomime horse costume were added to the show. His monologues were conducted within a few feet of the camera versus the long-distance Johnny Carson kept from the camera and audience.

The Late Late Show averaged 2.0 million viewers in its 2007 season, compared with 2.5 million for Late Night with Conan O'Brien. In April 2008, The Late Late Show with Craig Ferguson beat Late Night with Conan O'Brien for weekly ratings (1.88 million to 1.77 million) for the first time since the two shows went head-to-head with their respective hosts.

In March 2009, Craig Ferguson topped Jimmy Fallon in the ratings with Ferguson getting a 1.8 rating and Fallon receiving a 1.6 rating. By 2014, Ferguson's ratings had faltered, trailing those of Late Night with Seth Meyers with an average of 1.35 million viewers versus 2.02 million.

On 28 April 2014, Ferguson announced he would leave The Late Late Show at the end of 2014, with the final episode airing on 19 December. His contract was set to expire in June 2014, but a six-month extension was agreed on to provide a more graceful exit and give CBS more time to find a replacement host. He reportedly received US$5 million as part of his contract because he was not selected as the replacement for David Letterman's Late Show. Ferguson made the decision prior to Letterman's announcement but agreed to delay making his own decision public until the reaction to Letterman's decision (announced 3 April) had died down. CBS entertainment chair Nina Tassler said, following the announcement, that in his decade as host Ferguson had "infused the broadcast with tremendous energy, unique comedy, insightful interviews and some of the most heartfelt monologues seen on television." CBS continued the franchise with James Corden as the new host.

==== Post–Late Late Show ====
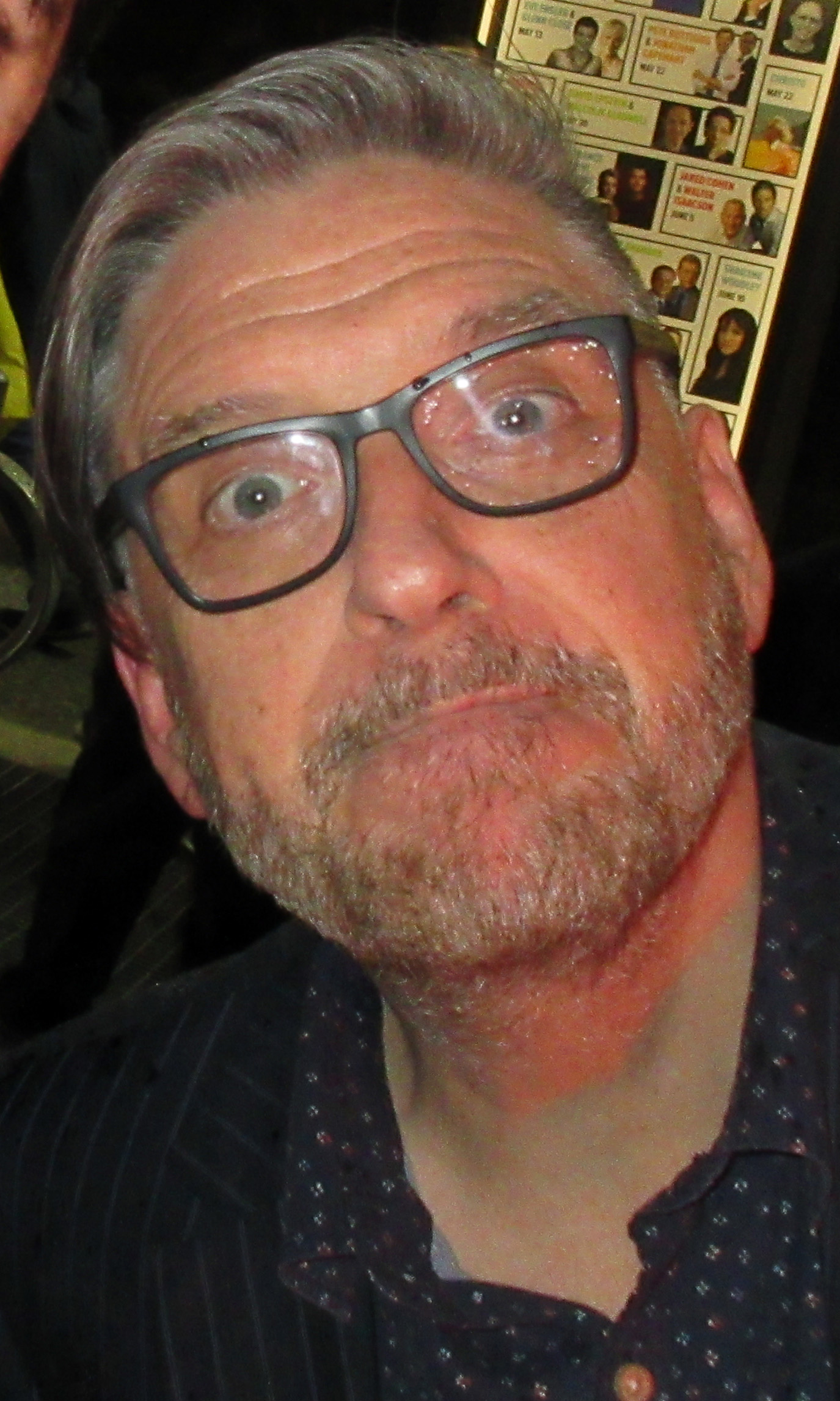
Ferguson in New York City, May 2019, five years following his departure from The Late Late Show

In October 2013, it was announced that Ferguson would host the syndicated game show Celebrity Name Game, produced by Coquette Productions, beginning in late 2014. Ferguson's involvement in the project dates back to 2011, when it was originally pitched and piloted as a CBS primetime series. As of April 2014, the series had an initial order of 180 episodes. The syndicated series began airing on 22 September 2014. Ferguson won Daytime Emmy Awards for Outstanding Game Show Host for Celebrity Name Game in 2015 and 2016. On 2 December 2016, it was announced that the series would end after three seasons.

Ferguson signed in 2015 to play Prentiss Porter in The King of 7B, a comedy pilot for ABC. The show was not picked up.

On 18 February 2016, Ferguson began to host a historical talk show on History titled Join or Die with Craig Ferguson. The title is a reference to a Benjamin Franklin political cartoon published in the Pennsylvania Gazette on 9 May 1754, which Ferguson had tattooed on his forearm after becoming an American citizen. Ferguson and a three-guest panel of comedians and historians conduct a humorous discussion of a different topic on each episode, such as the most doomed presidential campaign, greatest Founding Father and greatest invention, with viewers invited to share their opinions via Twitter.

Between January 2021 and April 2022, Ferguson hosted the American game show The Hustler, which aired on ABC. The show followed five contestants who collaborate to build up a cash prize by answering a series of trivia questions presented by Ferguson, while one of the contestants is secretly designated as the Hustler beforehand and given the answers to all the questions. By the end of the game, two of the honest contestants have been eliminated; the other two must correctly choose the Hustler in order to stop the Hustler from winning the entire prize. The series premiered on 4 January 2021, before moving to its regular timeslot on 7 January 2021, airing on Thursdays at 10 p.m. In April 2022, it was reported that the series was cancelled, having aired 19 episodes across two seasons. In May 2025, Ferguson was announced as the new host of the game show Scrabble on The CW Network, with his first episode broadcast in early 2026.

=== Other television work ===
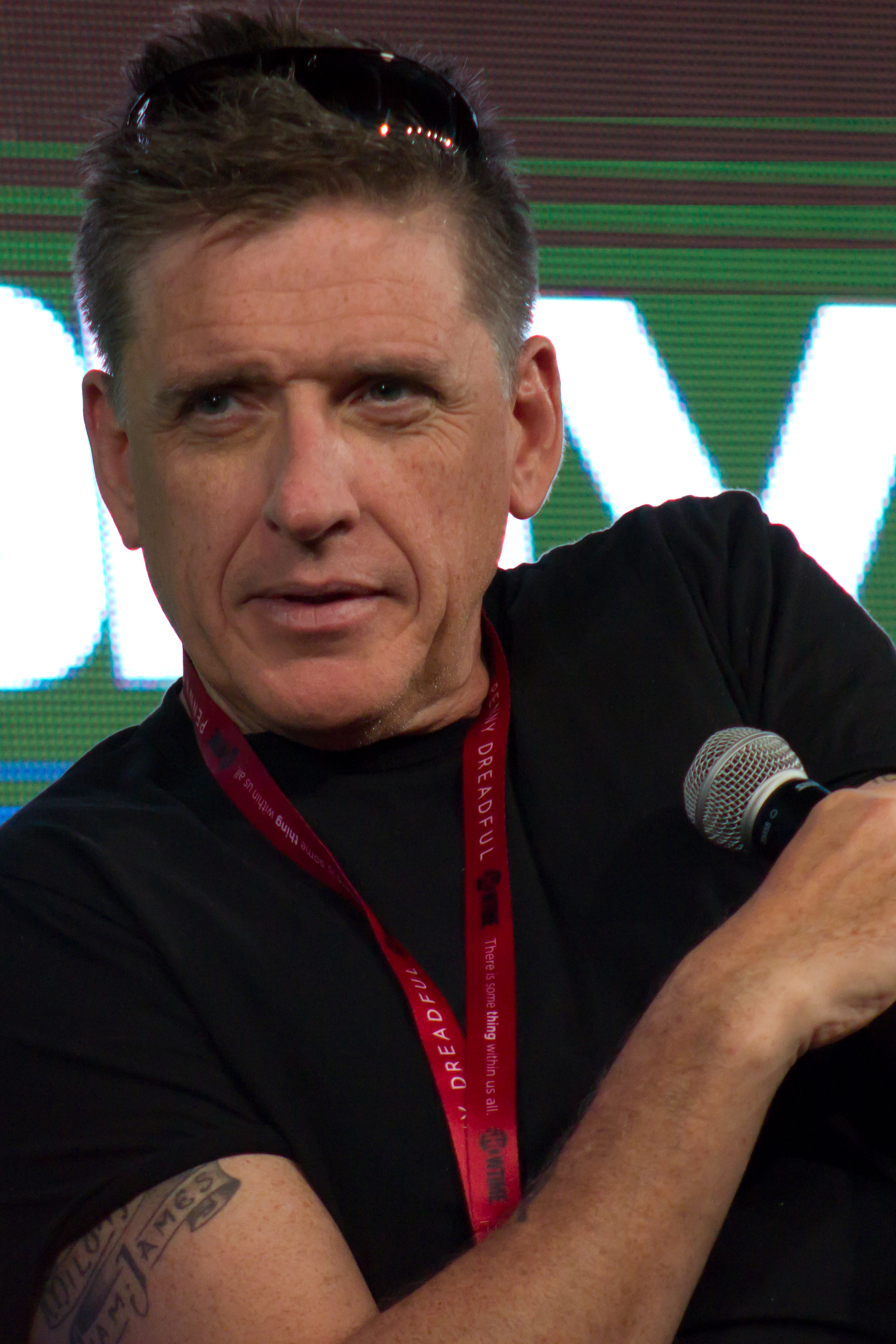
Ferguson speaking at San Diego Comic-Con, 2014

Craig Ferguson has made guest appearances on The Tonight Show with Jay Leno, Late Show with David Letterman, Late Night with Conan O'Brien, Rachael Ray, Countdown with Keith Olbermann, The Howard Stern Show, The Daily Show, The View, Loveline, Real Time with Bill Maher, The Soup, The Talk, The Price Is Right, Kevin Pollak's Chat Show, The Dennis Miller Show and The Late Show with Stephen Colbert. He also co-hosted Live with Regis & Kelly with Kelly Ripa and was guest host on the April Fools' Day episode of The Price Is Right in 2014. In 2009, Ferguson made a cameo live-action appearance in the episode "We Love You, Conrad" on Family Guy. Ferguson hosted the 32nd annual People's Choice Awards on 10 January 2006. From 2007 to 2010, Ferguson hosted the Boston Pops Fireworks Spectacular on 4 July, broadcast nationally by CBS. Ferguson was the featured entertainer at 26 April 2008 White House Correspondents' Association dinner in Washington, DC.

Ferguson co-presented the Emmy Award for Outstanding Lead Actress in a Drama with Brooke Shields in 2008. He has done voice work in cartoons, including being the voice of Barry's evil alter-ego in the "With Friends Like Steve's" episode of American Dad!; in Freakazoid! as Roddy MacStew, Freakazoid's mentor; and on Buzz Lightyear of Star Command as the robot vampire NOS-4-A2. He was the voice of Susan the Boil on Futurama, which was a parody of Scottish singer Susan Boyle. He makes stand-up appearances in Las Vegas and New York City. He headlined in the Just for Laughs festival in Montreal and in October 2008 Ferguson taped his stand-up show in Boston for a Comedy Central special entitled A Wee Bit o' Revolution, which aired on 22 March 2009.

British television comedy drama Doc Martin was based on a character from Ferguson's film Saving Grace – with Ferguson getting writing credits for 12 episodes. On 6 November 2009, Ferguson appeared as himself in a SpongeBob SquarePants special titled SpongeBob's Truth or Square. He hosted Discovery Channel's 23rd season of Shark Week in 2010. Ferguson briefly appeared in Toby Keith's "Red Solo Cup" music video, released on 10 October 2011. In January 2023, Sony Pictures Television (SPT) announced a new, half-hour syndicated late night talk show with Craig Ferguson as host. Channel Surf with Craig Ferguson was to be produced by Whisper North and be distributed by SPT. A pilot for Channel Surf with Craig Ferguson was shot in the UK at Dock10 studios, with SPT taking the show out to potential buyers in Los Angeles. As of September 2025, Channel Surf with Craig Ferguson has not yet aired after failing to be picked up by broadcasters. In September 2013, Ferguson guest-starred on the season finale of Hot in Cleveland as a priest/tabloid journalist who turns out to be the father of Joy's (Jane Leeves) son. The show reunited him with former co-star and frequent Late Late Show guest Betty White. Ferguson reprised the role for several episodes when the show returned in March 2014.

=== Radio ===
On 27 February 2017, Ferguson launched The Craig Ferguson Show, a two-hour talk radio show on the Comedy Greats channel and Faction Talk on SiriusXM Satellite Radio. His last new show aired 11 May 2018.

=== Literature ===
Ferguson's novel Between the Bridge and the River was published on 10 April 2006. He appeared at the Los Angeles Festival of Books, as well as other author literary events. "This book could scare them", he said, referring to audiences familiar with his television work. "The sex, the violence, the dream sequences and the iconoclasm. I think a lot of people are uncomfortable with that. I understand that. It was very uncomfortable to write some of it." The novel is dedicated to his elder son, Milo, and to his grandfather, Adam. He revealed in an interview that he is writing a sequel to the book, to be titled The Sphynx of the Mississippi. He also stated in a 2006 interview with David Letterman that he intends the book to be the first in a trilogy. As of February 2019, Ferguson has produced no further novels, although he has published non-fiction.

Ferguson signed a deal with HarperCollins to publish his memoirs. The book, entitled American on Purpose: The Improbable Adventures of an Unlikely Patriot, focuses on "how and why [he] became an American" and covers his years as a punk rocker, dancer, bouncer and construction worker as well as the rise of his career in Hollywood as an actor and comic. It went on sale 22 September 2009 in the United States. On 1 December 2010 the audiobook version was nominated for a Best Spoken Word Album Grammy.

In July 2009, Jackie Collins was a guest on The Late Late Show to promote her new book Married Lovers. Collins said a character in her book, Don Verona, was based on Ferguson because she was a fan of him and his show.

Ferguson wrote a short story for In Sunlight or in Shadow (2017, Pegasus Crime), an anthology edited by Lawrence Block and featuring works inspired by the paintings of Edward Hopper (1882–1967). Block is a favorite writer of Ferguson's and appeared multiple times on The Late Late Show. His third book, Riding the Elephant: A Memoir of Altercations, Humiliations, Hallucinations, and Observations, released 7 May 2019.

== Personal life ==
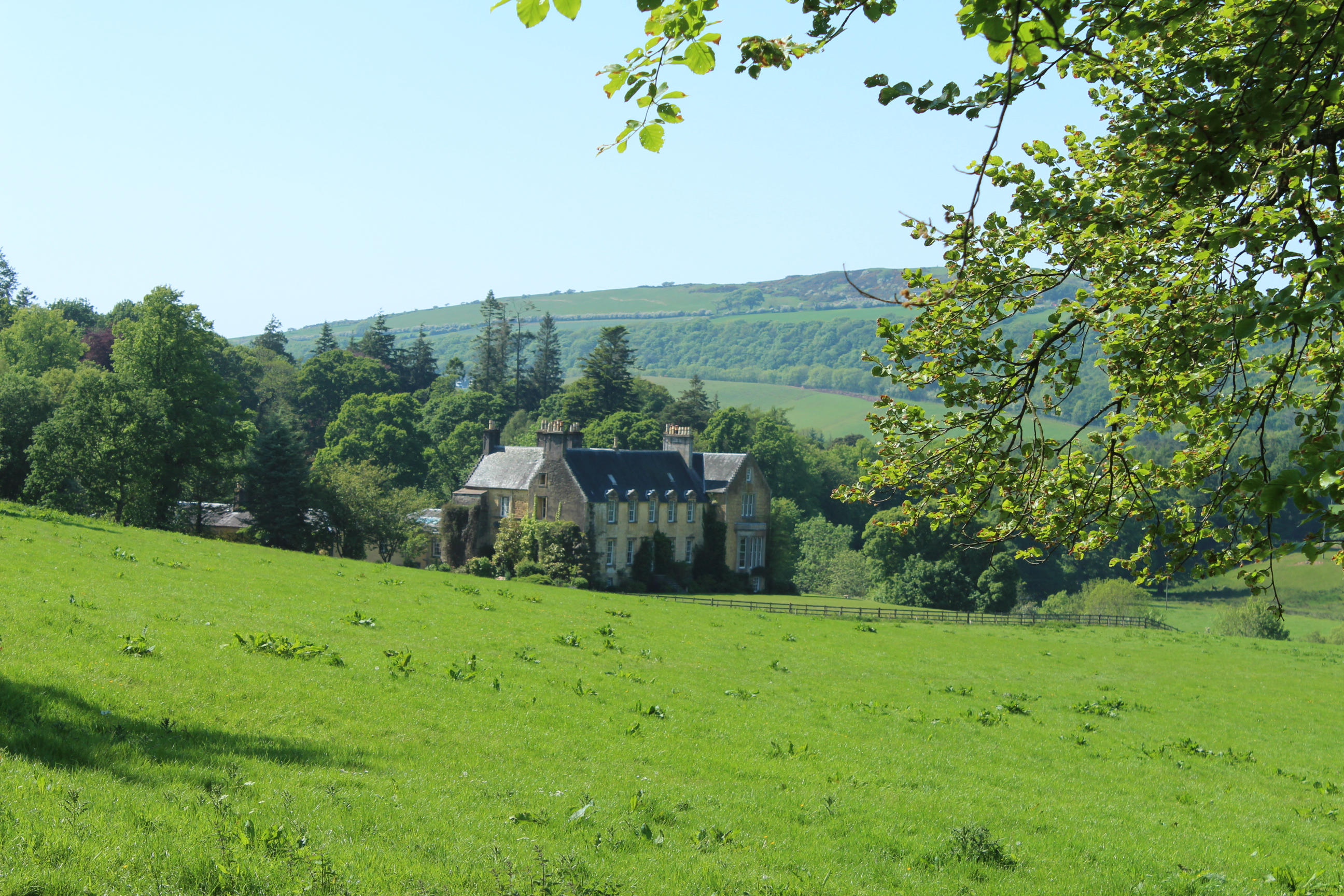
Bargany House in South Ayrshire, Scotland, which Ferguson purchased in 2011

Ferguson holds an FAA private pilot certificate, issued in 2009. Ferguson has been a vegan since 2013. A recovering alcoholic, he has been sober since 1992. During his early career, Ferguson resided in St John's Wood, London. Ferguson has been married three times and divorced twice. His first marriage was to Anne Hogarth from 1983 to 1986, during which time they lived in New York. His second marriage was to Sascha Corwin (founder and proprietor of Los Angeles' SpySchool), with whom he has a son named Milo, born in 2001. He and Corwin shared custody of their son, and lived near each other in the Hollywood Hills. Ferguson married art dealer Megan Wallace-Cunningham in a private ceremony on her family's farm in Chester, Vermont, in 2008. They have a son together, who was born in 2011.

Ferguson wrote in his book American on Purpose that he and actress Helen Atkinson-Wood were in a romantic relationship prior to his going sober in 1992. The relationship lasted five years. He acknowledges that she changed his life "beyond recognition" by improving his health and his career. Ferguson has stated that his comedy influences include Monty Python, Marx Brothers, The Three Stooges, Laurel and Hardy, and David Letterman.

He has multiple tattoos, including the Join, or Die political cartoon on his right forearm; a Ferguson family crest with the Latin motto Dulcius ex asperis ("Sweeter out of [or from] difficulty") on his upper right arm in honour of his father; and a Celtic cross with the Ingram clan motto Magnanimus esto (Be great of mind) on his upper left arm in honour of his mother. He has often said that his Join, or Die tattoo is intended to signal his American patriotism. Ferguson became an American citizen on 1 February 2008 and broadcast the taking of his citizenship test as well as his swearing in on The Late Late Show. In 2011, Ferguson bought Bargany House, a Category A listed mansion designated by Historic Environment Scotland, in South Ayrshire, Scotland. Ferguson later sold Bargany House in 2024 in order to re-locate from Scotland to New York City.

== Filmography ==
=== Film ===
| Year | Title | Role | Notes |
|---|---|---|---|
| 1998 | Modern Vampires | Richard | |
| 1999 | The Big Tease | Crawford Mackenzie | Also writer |
| 2000 | Chain of Fools | Melander Stevens | |
| 2000 | Born Romantic | Frankie | |
| 2000 | Saving Grace | Matthew Stewart | Also writer Nominated – British Independent Film Award for Best Screenplay |
| 2002 | Life Without Dick | Jared O'Reilly | |
| 2002 | Prendimi l'anima (The Soul Keeper) | Richard Fraser | |
| 2003 | I'll Be There | Paul Kerr | Also director and writer |
| 2004 | Lemony Snicket's A Series of Unfortunate Events | Person of Indeterminate Gender | |
| 2004 | Lenny the Wonder Dog | Dr. Richard Wagner | |
| 2005 | Niagara Motel | Phillie | |
| 2007 | Trust Me | Ted Truman | |
| 2009 | The Ugly Truth | Himself | Cameo |
| 2010 | How to Train Your Dragon | Gobber (voice) | |
| 2010 | Kick-Ass | Himself | Cameo |
| 2010 | Legend of the Boneknapper Dragon | Gobber (voice) | Short film |
| 2011 | Gift of the Night Fury | Gobber (voice) | Short film |
| 2011 | Book of Dragons | Gobber (voice) | Short film |
| 2011 | Winnie the Pooh | Owl (voice) | |
| 2012 | Brave | Lord Macintosh (voice) | |
| 2012 | Big Top Scooby-Doo! | Whitney Doubleday (voice) | Direct-to-video |
| 2014 | How to Train Your Dragon 2 | Gobber (voice) | |
| 2014 | Postman Pat: The Movie | Craig, Not a Dalek (voice) | |
| 2014 | The Hero of Color City | Nat (voice) | |
| 2018 | Duck Duck Goose | Giles (voice) | |
| 2019 | How to Train Your Dragon: The Hidden World | Gobber (voice) | |
| 2020 | Then Came You | Howard | |

=== Television ===
| Year | Title | Role | Notes |
|---|---|---|---|
| 1988 | Red Dwarf | Lister's Confidence | Episode: "Confidence and Paranoia" |
| 1988 | Chelmsford 123 | Scott | Episode: "Peeled, Grapes, and Pedicures" |
| 1988 | The Laughter Show | Various Characters | Episode: "2.4" |
| 1991 | Friday Night at the Dome | Presenter | Channel 4 live series |
| 1992 | The Bogie Man | Detective Sergeant Ure | Television film |
| 1993 | One Foot in the Grave | Glaswegian beach bully | Episode: "One foot in the Algarve" |
| 1993 | The Dirt Detective: A History of Scotland | Himself (host) | 6 episodes |
| 1994 | The Ferguson Theory | Various roles | 5 episodes; also creator, writer, executive producer |
| 1995–1996 | Maybe This Time | Logan McDonough | 18 episodes |
| 1995 | Aaahh!!! Real Monsters | Cammander, French Man, Weatherman (voice) | Episode: "Garbage Ahoy" |
| 1995–1997 | Freakazoid! | Roddy MacStew (voice) | 5 episodes |
| 1996–2004 | The Drew Carey Show | Nigel Wick | 185 episodes |
| 1996 | Almost Perfect | Peter Church | Episode: "Suites for the Sweet" |
| 1998 | The Lionhearts | Various roles | Episode: "Survive" |
| 1998 | Hercules | Agent Epsilon, Orion (voice) | 3 episodes |
| 1999 | The Wild Thornberrys | Jope (voice) | Episode: "Dances with Dingoes" |
| 2000 | Buzz Lightyear of Star Command | NOS-4-A2 (voice) | 5 episodes |
| 2001 | The Angry Beavers | Wizard, TV Announcer (voice) | Episode: "Beavemaster" |
| 2001 | The Norm Show | Rob | Episode: "Norm Comes Back" |
| 2001 | The Legend of Tarzan | Samuel T. Philander (voice) | 4 episodes |
| 2005 | Life as We Know It | Oliver Davies | Episode: "Papa Wheelie" |
| 2005–2014 | The Late Late Show with Craig Ferguson | Himself (host) | 2,058 episodes; also writer |
| 2005 | Vampire Bats | Fisherman | Television film |
| 2006, 2019 | American Dad! | Evil Barry (voice) | 2 episodes |
| 2008 | White House Correspondents' Dinner | Himself (host) | Television special |
| 2009 | Craig Ferguson: A Wee Bit o' Revolution | Himself | Stand-up special |
| 2009 | Family Guy | Himself | Episode: "We Love You, Conrad" |
| 2009 | SpongeBob SquarePants | Himself | Episode: "SpongeBob's Truth or Square" |
| 2010 | Futurama | Susan Boil (voice) | Episode: "Attack of the Killer App" |
| 2011 | Archer | Announcer (voice) | Episode: "Jeu Monégasque" |
| 2011 | Craig Ferguson: Does This Need to Be Said? | Himself | Stand-up special |
| 2012 | Political Animals | Himself | Episode: "Pilot" |
| 2013–2015 | Hot in Cleveland | Simon | 7 episodes |
| 2013 | Sean Saves the World | Andrew | Episode: "Of Moles and Men" |
| 2013 | Craig Ferguson: I'm Here to Help | Himself | Stand-up special |
| 2014 | The Price is Right | Himself (host) | Episode: "April Fools" |
| 2014–2017 | Celebrity Name Game | Himself (host) | 257 episodes; also executive producer |
| 2014 | Web Therapy | Ewan Clarke | 2 Episodes |
| 2015 | Craig Ferguson: Just Being Honest | Himself | Stand-up special |
| 2016 | Join or Die with Craig Ferguson | Himself (host) | 22 episodes; also creator and executive producer |
| 2016 | Red Nose Day | Himself (host) | Television special |
| 2017 | Lip Sync Battle | Himself | Episode: "Craig Ferguson vs. Jay Leno" |
| 2017 | Craig Ferguson: Tickle Fight | Himself | Stand-up special |
| 2018 | Still Game | Callum Coburn | Episode: "The Fall Guy" |
| 2019 | Craig Ferguson Presents: Hobo Fabulous | Himself | Stand-up docuseries |
| 2019 | How to Train Your Dragon: Homecoming | Gobber (voice) | Television special |
| 2021 | The Hustler | Himself | |
| 2022 | Alice's Wonderland Bakery | Doorknob (voice) | 2 episodes |
| 2022 | Love, Death & Robots | Mason (voice) | Episode: "Mason's Rats" |
| 2024 | Craig Ferguson: I'm So Happy | Himself | Stand-up special |
| 2025 | The American Revolution | John Murray, 4th Earl of Dunmore (voice) | TV documentary |
| 2026–present | Scrabble | Himself (host) | |

=== Podcasts ===
| Year | Title | Company | Role |
|---|---|---|---|
| 2023–2026 | Joy, a Podcast. Hosted by Craig Ferguson | iHeartPodcasts | Himself (host) |

=== Radio ===
| Year | Title | Company | Role |
|---|---|---|---|
| 2017–2018 | The Craig Ferguson Show | SiriusXM | Himself (host) |

=== Web ===
| Year | Title | Role | Notes |
|---|---|---|---|
| 2014 | Web Therapy | Ewan Clarke | 3 Episodes |
| 2017 | Couple Thinkers | Himself (host) | 6 episodes; also executive producer |

=== Video games ===
| Year | Title | Voice |
|---|---|---|
| 2013 | Disney Magical World | Owl |

== Awards and nominations ==
| Year | Award | Category | Work | Result |
|---|---|---|---|---|
| 2000 | British Independent Film Award | Best Screenplay | Saving Grace | Nominated |
| 2003 | US Comedy Arts Festival | Audience Award | I'll Be There | Won |
| 2006 | Primetime Emmy Award | Outstanding Individual Performance in a Variety or Music Program | The Late Late Show with Craig Ferguson | Nominated |
| 2009 | Peabody Award | | The Late Late Show with Craig Ferguson | Won |
| 2011 | Grammy Award | Best Spoken Word Album | American on Purpose | Nominated |
| 2014 | Grammy Award | Best Comedy Album | I'm Here to Help | Nominated |
| 2015 | People's Choice Award | Favorite Late Night Talk Show Host | The Late Late Show with Craig Ferguson | Nominated |
| 2015 | Daytime Emmy Award | Outstanding Game Show Host | Celebrity Name Game | Won |
| 2016 | Grammy Award | Best Comedy Album | Just Being Honest | Nominated |
| 2016 | Daytime Emmy Award | Outstanding Game Show Host | Celebrity Name Game | Won |
| 2017 | Daytime Emmy Award | Outstanding Game Show Host | Celebrity Name Game | Nominated |

== Discography ==
- Live at the Tron (as Bing Hitler). Jammy Records. 1986. Catalogue number JRLP 861.
- Mental; Bing Hitler Is Dead? Polydor. 1988.
- A Big Stoatir. Polydor. 1990.
- I'm Here to Help. New Wave Dynamics. 2013.
- Tickle Fight - 2018
- Hobo Fabulous - 2020
