= Robert Wightman =

American actor

- Born: Robert Douglas Wightman; December 29, 1952 (age 73); Los Angeles, California, U.S.
- Occupation: Actor
- Years active: 1979–2004

Robert Wightman (born December 29, 1952) is an American actor.

== Biography ==
Wightman often works in the theater, notably in the West Coast Premier of the Tennessee Williams' play Vieux Carré, produced with Williams' blessing by Karen Kondazian and starring Ray Stricklyn. Critic Robert Osborne said both Stricklyn and Wightman gave "touching and heartbreaking performances". Wightman has appeared in two other works of Williams produced by Kondazian, Sweet Bird of Youth with Ed Harris, and the Los Angeles Drama Critics Circle Award-winning production of The Rose Tattoo, which was praised by Williams himself who said he had never seen the play better directed than by Clyde Ventura. Sylvie Drake in the Los Angeles Times singled-out "the excellent Robert Wightman" as Edgar in LATC's King Lear, and Hoyt Hilsman writing for Backstage praised his "lovely and mysterious" portrayal as Budge in the dark comedy The Day Room by Don DeLillo.

Wightman replaced Richard Thomas in the role of John-Boy Walton in the TV series The Waltons. He played the role beginning with the show's eighth season in 1979 until the end of the series in 1981. He also appeared in the role in the TV movie A Day of Thanks on Walton's Mountain in 1982. His movie credits include American Gigolo and the starring role in Stepfather III, taking over the role originally played by Terry O'Quinn.

== Selected filmography ==
- The Waltons (1979–1981 TV series; 1982 movie)
- American Gigolo (1980)
- Missing Children : A Mother's Story (1982)
- Impulse (1984)
- Capitol (1985–86)
- On Wings of Eagles (1986)
- Opposing Force (1986)
- It's a Living (1987)
- Stepfather III (1993)
- Matlock (1993)
- Living in Oblivion (1995)
- Box of Moon Light (1996)
- Poodle Springs (1998)
