= Carrie Stevens =

American model (born 1969)

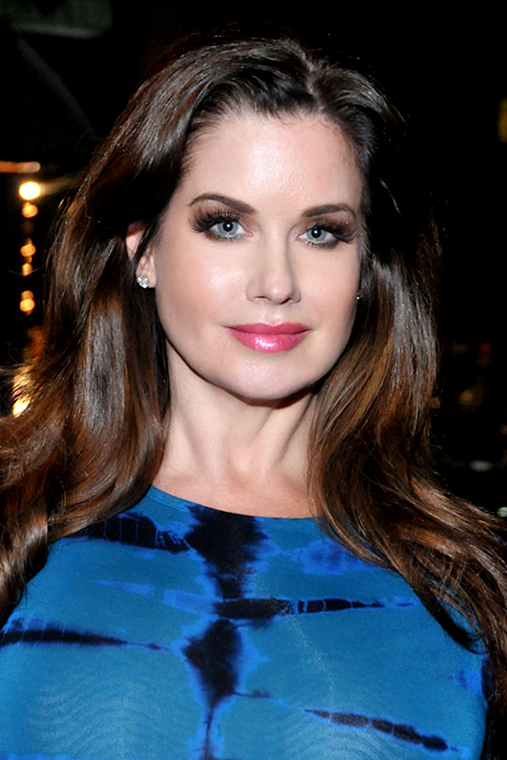
- Stevens in 2014

Playboy centerfold appearance
- June 1997
- Preceded by: Lynn Thomas
- Succeeded by: Daphnée Duplaix

Personal details
- Born: May 1, 1969 (age 56) Buffalo, New York
- Height: 5 ft 6 in (1.68 m)
- Official website

Carrie Stevens (born May 1, 1969) is an American model and actress. She was Playboy's Playmate of the Month for June 1997.

== Early life ==
Carrie Stevens was born in Buffalo, New York and grew up in Hardwick, Massachusetts. Later she studied journalism at Memphis State University. Growing up, her family composted and grew their own organic fruits and vegetables, milked goats to make cheese, and kept chickens for their eggs. Her father was a research scientist and her mother was an artist. When her parents divorced, she went with her mother to Memphis, Tennessee.

== Career ==
=== Movies and television ===
After being spotted in a dentist's waiting room by a Hollywood talent agent, Stevens' first television appearance was on an episode of the daytime soap opera Days of Our Lives in 1992. She has appeared in numerous television shows, including the Sci-Fi Channel's Black Scorpion along with an episode of Wild On! for E! Entertainment Television. In addition, she's had small roles in Pacific Blue and Beverly Hills, 90210, the daytime TV drama Days of Our Lives and 18 Wheels of Justice. She guest starred on Jake in Progress and Two and a Half Men.

Early in her acting career, Stevens appears in several low budget straight-to-video erotic thrillers such as Dead End (1992), Sins of Desire (1993) with Tanya Roberts and Gail Thackray, Point of Seduction: Body Chemistry III (1994) with Morgan Fairchild, and Jane Street (1996).

In 2001, Stevens had a small roles in several movies, including Vegas, City of Dreams, Rock Star with Mark Wahlberg and Jennifer Aniston, and Longshot with NSYNC and Britney Spears, as well as a lead role in another low budget thriller called Head Games. This was followed up with small supporting roles in The Backlot Murders (horror), Cruel Game (thriller), Who's Your Daddy? (comedy) in 2002, Hollywoo in 2011, and the 2013 movie Birdemic 2: The Resurrection. She was featured in the Third Eye Blind music video for "Never Let You Go" from their second studio album Blue (1999).

=== Modeling ===
Steven's modelling career began with local modelling in the Memphis region. After moving to California, she appeared in a few print ads and commercials. Stevens then got her big modelling break when selected as Playboy's Playmate of The Month for June 1997. She later appeared in the March 1999 Playboy Special Edition Playmates in Bed – both on the cover and in a photo-shoot inside. Stevens was then the cover model for the Fall 2002 issue of Gene Simmons' magazine, Gene Simmons Tongue, which also included a feature article, "Carrie Stevens: Confessions of a Rock Starlet". She has also appeared in Cosmopolitan, Glamour, Allure, and Women's Fitness.

=== Writing ===
Stevens wrote a monthly column for Hot Mom's Club magazine. In 2020, Stevens published Unrated: Revelations of a Rock 'n' Roll Centerfold — her memoir of her life with her late boyfriend Eric Carr, the drummer of Kiss, to Sultans and Billionaires.

=== Other ventures ===
Stevens founded the online green fashion magazine Envi-Image. She had several fellow Playmates model clothing for her. The website is now defunct, but when it was in operation it provided coverage of the green lifestyle and showcased environmentally friendly apparel, jewelry, make-up, hair and skincare products. Stevens also founded another website called PlaymatesforthePlanet.com, which promoted environmental and green efforts.

Stevens also owns Carrie Stevens Infamous Family Fudge, which sells fudge online. Launched in 2014, the company's products are inspired by her grandmother's recipes for fudge.

== Personal life ==
In 1987, at the age of 17, Stevens met Eric Carr, then-drummer of the rock band Kiss, who was 37 at the time. She spent nearly four years in a relationship with Carr until his death in 1991, and was interviewed at length for the 2011 book The Eric Carr Story. Stevens now lives in Los Angeles with her son Jaxon, born from a subsequent relationship with her ex-boyfriend, film director Stephen Herek, whom she met during the filming of Rock Star.

== Filmography ==
=== Film ===
Year	Title	Role	Notes
1992	Dead End	-	
1993	Sins of Desire	Pam	
1993	Little Miss Millions	Girl on Bus	
1994	Point of Seduction: Body Chemistry III	Leslie	Video
1996	Jane Street	Sarah	
2001	Vegas, City of Dreams	Gabrielle Garrett	
2001	Rock Star	Ghode's Wife Daphne	
2001	Longshot	Waitress	
2001	Head Games	Samantha	
2002	The Backlot Murders	Chelsea	Video
2002	Redemption	Tara	Video
2002	Cruel Game	Jenny	
2002	Who's Your Daddy?	Angel Wanna-Be	
2010	Dinocroc vs. Supergator	Drake's Nurse	TV movie
2010	The Mule	Kristin Moore	Short
2011	Hollywoo	Fiancée de Marlow	
2013	Birdemic 2: The Resurrection	Tree Hugger's Wife	
2024	Holy Cash	Voluptuous Woman	

=== Television ===
Year	Title	Role	Notes
1992	Days of Our Lives	Heather	Regular Cast
1994	Weird Science	Kristen	Episode: "She's Alive"
1997	Wild On!	Herself	Episode: "Wild on the Caribbean"
1997	Beverly Hills, 90210	Marcy	Episode: "Aloha Beverly Hills: Part 1"
1999	Pacific Blue	Cybervixen	Episode: "Trust"
2001	18 Wheels of Justice	Natalie Reno	Episode: "Countdown"
2001	Black Scorpion	Celeste McCloud	Recurring Cast
2001	Spy TV	Herself	Episode: "Episode #1.8"
2006	Jake in Progress	Kelli	Episode: "The Hot One"
2006	Two and a Half Men	Pam	Episode: "Kissing Abraham Lincoln"
2009	E! True Hollywood Story	Herself	Episode: "Hollywood Ex-Wives"
2014	MOCKpocalypse	Herself	Episode: "Crotch Rock"

Jami Ferrell	Kimber West	Jennifer Miriam	Kelly Monaco	Lynn Thomas	Carrie Stevens
Daphnée Duplaix	Kalin Olson	Nikki Ziering	Layla Roberts	Inga Drozdova	Karen McDougal
