= American on Purpose =

2009 memoir by Craig Ferguson

American on Purpose: The Improbable Adventures of an Unlikely Patriot
- Author: Craig Ferguson
- Language: English
- Publisher: Harper (imprint)
- Publication date: September 22, 2009
- Publication place: United States
- Media type: Audiobook, Ebook, Print (hardcover)
- Pages: 288 (Hardcover)
- ISBN: 978-0-06-171954-7 (Hardcover)
- OCLC: 436441171

American on Purpose: The Improbable Adventures of an Unlikely Patriot is a memoir written by entertainer Craig Ferguson.

The book details various experiences over several decades in Ferguson's life from his days in Scotland through his migration to the United States; the rise of his performing career in the United Kingdom, then Hollywood, and eventual acquisition of US citizenship in early 2008. He tells about his assorted jobs as a musician in a punk rock band, a bouncer, a construction worker, comedian and actor, as well as his struggle with alcoholism and drug abuse, and contemplation of suicide at a low point in his life.

In December 2010 the audiobook version, read by Ferguson, was nominated for a Best Spoken Word Album Grammy.

== Promotion ==
A few weeks before and after the book went on sale, Ferguson's The Late Late Show featured a recurring segment called "Celebrities Read Excerpts from Craig's Book", with various celebrity guests reading anecdotes from the book in a green-screened library set.
