= The Backlot Murders =

- Directed by: David DeFalco
- Written by: Paul Arensburg; Steven Jay Bernheim
- Starring: Priscilla Barnes; Charles Fleischer; Corey Haim
- Release date: 2002
- Running time: 90 minutes
- Country: United States
- Language: English

The Backlot Murders (also known as Death is Directing in Germany) is a 2002 American slasher film directed by David DeFalco. It stars Priscilla Barnes, Charles Fleischer and Corey Haim. The film follows a killer in an Elvis mask, murdering the cast and crew of a music video shoot.

== Synopsis ==
When a rock band travels to a movie lot to shoot a music video, they are not expecting much — especially since the main reason the band is getting the video is that its lead vocalist (Brian Gaskill) is dating the daughter (Jamie Anstead) of a big shot record producer (Tom Hallick). However, soon after they arrive, they find themselves sharing their stage with a serial killer in an Elvis mask.

== Cast ==
- Priscilla Barnes as Stephanie
- Corey Haim as Tony
- Charles Fleischer as Henry
- Brian Gaskill as Dez
- Carrie Stevens as Chelsea
- Ken Sagoes as Mike
- Angela Little as Shayla

== Reception ==
Critical reception has been mixed. Bloody Disgusting panned the film overall, as they felt that the film was too cheesy for early 2000s fare and that it was overall "just too unimaginative". EFilmCritic.com reviewer Jack Sommersby was more positive, writing that it was "good, trashy fun, with the proper proportion of blood, nudity and humor."
