= A Vacation in Hell =

- Priscilla Barnes
- Genre: Action; Adventure; Thriller
- Written by: Shelley Katz; D.B. Ledrov
- Directed by: David Greene
- Starring: Priscilla Barnes; Maureen McCormick; Barbara Feldon; Andrea Marcovicci; Michael Brandon
- Music by: Gil Mellé
- Country of origin: United States
- Original language: English

Production
- Executive producer: David Greene
- Producers: Bill Finnegan; Pat Finnegan
- Production location: Hawaii
- Cinematography: Harry J. May
- Editors: Ken Zemke; Parkie L. Singh
- Running time: 120 minutes
- Production company: Finnegan Associates

Original release
- Network: ABC
- Release: May 21, 1979

A Vacation in Hell is a 1979 American made-for-television, action-adventure-thriller film starring Priscilla Barnes, Barbara Feldon, Maureen McCormick, Andrea Marcovicci, and Michael Brandon as part of a group of lost vacationers being stalked through the Hawaiian jungle. It was helmed by Roots director David Greene and has acquired a cult following, due in large part to subsequent reairings in syndication.

== Cast ==
- Priscilla Barnes ... Denise
- Barbara Feldon ... Evelyn
- Andrea Marcovicci ... Barbara
- Maureen McCormick ... Margret
- Michael Brandon ... Alan
- Ed Ka'ahea ... the Hunter
