= The Wild Women of Chastity Gulch =

1982 film

- Genre: Comedy; Romance; Western
- Written by: Earl W. Wallace
- Directed by: Philip Leacock
- Starring: Priscilla Barnes; Joan Collins; Lee Horsley; Donny Osmond; Morgan Brittany; Lisa Whelchel; Howard Duff
- Music by: Frank De Vol
- Country of origin: United States
- Original language: English

Production
- Executive producers: Aaron Spelling; Douglas S. Cramer
- Producer: Shelley Hull
- Cinematography: Richard L. Rawlings
- Editor: Patrick Kennedy
- Running time: 100 minutes
- Production company: Aaron Spelling Productions

Original release
- Network: ABC
- Release: October 31, 1982

The Wild Women of Chastity Gulch is a 1982 American made-for-television Western romantic comedy film directed by Philip Leacock and starring Priscilla Barnes, Lee Horsley, Joan Collins, Donny Osmond, Morgan Brittany, and Lisa Whelchel. Executive produced by Aaron Spelling, it premiered on ABC on October 31, 1982, and was later syndicated to cable television for rebroadcast.

== Synopsis ==
In Civil War-era Southern Missouri, Dr. Maggie McCullough travels to the aid of her ailing aunt, Annie, the town's madame, in the lovely community of Sweetwater. With all of the men away at war, Maggie coordinates a truce between Aunt Annie's girls and the respectable women of the town. While Maggie contemplates the love triangle that is formed with an injured Union fighter, Frank Isaacs, and a captured Confederate doctor, Captain John Cane, a demented faction of soldiers invades Sweetwater and the women must spring into action to defend their homes.

== Cast ==
- Priscilla Barnes ... Maggie McCulloch
- Lee Horsley ... Captain John Cain
- Joan Collins ... Annie McCulloch
- Howard Duff ... Colonel Samuel Isaacs
- Morgan Brittany ... Lannie
- Donny Osmond ... Frank Isaacs
- Lisa Whelchel ... Amy Cole
- Pamela Bellwood ... Sarah
- Phyllis Davis ... Sugar Harris
- Jeanette Nolan ... Gertrude
- Paul Brinegar ... Bodie
- Dennis Fimple ... Lamont
- Susan Kellermann ... Betsy
- Paul Carr ... Confederate Captain
- Rex Holman ... Lt. Pritchard
- Rayford Barnes ... Russell
- Steve Hanks ... Lt. James
- Tom Clark ... Matthew
- Robert Rymill ... Sam
- Jerry J. Lewandowski ... Tommy
- Scott Arthur Allen ... Tom Trombitas

== Reception ==
Reviewing the film in 2023, Jim McLennan wrote:

From a modern perspective, perhaps the most unusual thing is seeing the Union soldiers (with the exception of Frank) portrayed as the villains of the piece. These days, the Confederate flag is basically the same thing as the swastika, yet the movie seems perfectly happy to accept that there were basically decent people on both sides. Pointedly, at the end, nobody mentions who won the war, because that's not important – just that it's over. Though on the other hand, there is literally not a single non-Caucasian in the entire movie. It's flat-out impossible to imagine any depiction of the Civil War like this being made nowadays, making it a period piece almost as much as the era it represents.

== See also ==
- List of television films produced for American Broadcasting Company
