= Between the Bridge and the River =

2006 novel by Craig Ferguson

- Author: Craig Ferguson
- Publisher: Chronicle Books
- Publication date: March 2006
- Pages: 352 (hard cover)
- ISBN: 0-8118-5375-6 (Hardcover); ISBN 0-8118-5819-7 (Paperback)
- OCLC: 62172728
- Dewey Decimal: 823/.92 22
- LC Class: PR6106.E764 B48 2006

Between the Bridge and the River (ISBN 0-8118-5375-6, ISBN 0-8118-5819-7) is a novel written by Craig Ferguson.

== Background ==
The novel has been characterized as a satire of religion and the entertainment industry. Ferguson has hinted in various interviews that there is a fair amount of autobiography in the story.

Ferguson has attributed the inspiration for the novel's title to a conversation with a Jesuit priest about whether all those who commit suicide go to hell. According to Ferguson, the priest said that while suicide was a mortal sin, if someone were to jump from a bridge and genuinely repented of their action before they hit the river they would be forgiven. Ferguson interpreted this as there always being one last chance of redemption, which is the core of the adventures in the novel.

Ferguson's great grandfather, Adam McLachlan, appears as a supporting character.

== Plot ==
The novel follows two best friends from Glasgow: Fraser Darby, an alcoholic televangelist caught up in a sex scandal, and George Ingram, an attorney diagnosed with terminal cancer who contemplates suicide. In a parallel, the story also follows two half-brothers in the Southern U.S.: Leon and Saul Martini, the illegitimate children of a Las Vegas, Nevada showgirl, with the two fathers being Frank Sinatra and Peter Lawford. Eventually the lives of these four men intersect in a journey that ranges from Scotland to France, from Atlanta, Georgia to rural Florida, and from Hollywood to Belgium during World War I.

Supporting characters in the story include philosopher Socrates, poet Virgil, psychiatrist Carl Gustav Jung and actor Tony Randall.

== See also ==
- Religion in Scotland
