= The Time Machine (1978 film) =

- John Beck as Dr. Neil Perry and Priscilla Barnes as Weena
- Based on: The Time Machine by H.G. Wells
- Written by: Wallace C. Bennett
- Directed by: Henning Schellerup
- Starring: John Beck; Priscilla Barnes; Whit Bissell; Rosemary DeCamp
- Music by: John Cacavas
- Country of origin: United States
- Original language: English

Production
- Executive producer: Charles E. Sellier Jr.
- Producer: James Simmons
- Cinematography: Stephen W. Gray
- Editor: Trevor Jolly
- Running time: 95 minutes
- Production company: Sunn Classic Pictures

Original release
- Network: NBC
- Release: November 5, 1978

The Time Machine is a 1978 American made-for-television science fiction-adventure film produced by Sunn Classic Pictures as a part of their Classics Illustrated series. The film is loosely based on the 1895 science fiction novel of the same name by English author H. G. Wells. The film stars John Beck and Priscilla Barnes, and was broadcast November 5, 1978 during the November Sweeps on NBC.

== Plot ==
Dr. Neil Perry is a 1970s scientist working for a fictional US defense contractor, "the Mega Corporation". According to his senior co-worker Branly, Perry is one of Mega's most reliable contributors. Perry's skill is demonstrated by his rapid reprogramming of an off-course satellite, averting a disaster that could have destroyed Los Angeles. His reputation had secured a grant of $20 million for his time machine project. A month from completion, the corporation wants Perry to put his project on hold so that he can begin work on a new weapons project, the "anti-matter bomb." The unexpectedly early completion of the power module that Perry needed to complete the time machine permits him to test his creation the weekend before he is set to begin work on the anti-matter bomb.

Perry time travels twice over the course of the weekend, and reports to Branly, Haverson, and J.R. Worthington, chairman of the board of Mega Corporation. As Perry tells the story of his travels, reversed time-lapse images of building construction demonstrate Perry's passage backwards in time. Unlike the novel, the time machine and its rider do not stay in the same place as they travel through time, and the machine can travel to different locations. Perry first goes to 1692 Salem, Massachusetts, where he is caught up in the Salem witch trials and found guilty of witchcraft. He is sentenced to be burned at the stake with his time machine. Tied up in the seat of his machine, he is able to free himself in order to escape. He detours into 1871 to avoid a time warp and arrives in the midst of the California Gold Rush, where he is shot at by miners who thinks that he is trying to steal their gold shipment and is arrested. Perry's ingenuity and the distraction of a bank robbery allow him to escape.

When Perry returns to his lab in the present, he receives a chilling report of the environmental impact of Mega Corporation's latest weapons. Perry then travels into the future to supply proof for the report's projections and convince Haverson that Mega's current agenda will lead to global devastation. Perry witnesses the fiery destruction of civilization (stopping briefly in October 2025 with elevated radiation levels on what appears to be desert salt flats), but also the re-emergence of nature from the wasteland. During the devastation humanity retreated underground. Eventually some decided to return to the surface. Those who did so became the Eloi. Those who remained underground became the Morlocks. The Morlocks have just begun to "harvest" the Eloi for food when Perry arrives on the scene (the year is not made specific). He is befriended by Weena, who explains how the Eloi-Morlock world came to be. A special museum of technology, showcasing weapons from Perry's era, includes Perry's name on a card identifying a weapon he designed. A video and audio presentation in the museum reveals that Perry's new assignment at Mega Corporation will be directly responsible for the world's destruction. Before he returns to his own time, Perry and Ariel, the male Eloi, use plastic explosives found in the museum to seal off the Morlocks' three entrances to the Eloi habitat.

Perry gives his report to Branly, Haverson, and Worthington. Branly believes Perry and praises him, but both are revolted when they discover Haverson and Worthington are both uninterested in saving the world from destruction; instead, they are interested in using the time machine to gain a military advantage over other world powers as well as acquiring every scientific breakthrough for their own gain. Branly resigns from Mega alongside secretary Agnes, while Perry likewise leaves them and returns to Weena and the Eloi who are all now free of the Morlocks.

== Cast ==
- John Beck as Dr. Neil Perry
- Whit Bissell as Ralph Branly
- Priscilla Barnes as Weena
- R. G. Armstrong as General Harris
- John Zaremba as The Secretary of Defense
- Andrew Duggan as Mega Board Chairman J.R. Washington (pronounced "Worthington")
- Rosemary DeCamp as Agnes, Neil Perry's Secretary
- Jack Kruschen as John Bedford
- John Hansen as Ariel
- John Doucette as Sheriff Finley
- Nick Steury as Dark Morlock
- Parley Baer as Henry Haverson
- Bill Zuckert as Charlie

== Critical response ==
Film critic David Sindelar defended the film against the accusation that it departs entirely from the novel. He stated that the film's anti-war message was done better and more subtly by the George Pal film. Sindelar poked fun at Perry's adventures in colonial America and the California Gold Rush and felt the Eloi appear and act too much like contemporary American young people.

== Shooting locations ==
The Collier & Heins Financial Consultants building complex in Salt Lake City, Utah, was used for some of the modern era scenes. James Collier was president of the company in the late 1970s, and his office was used as Haverson's office. The Morlock scenes were shot in Park City, Utah - in at least the Silver King Mine - and around other mines. Parts of the film were also shot in Kamas, Utah and also inside the Timpanogos Caves in American Fork, Utah (Section VII of article cited, Per #49).

== Cast note ==
John Zaremba and Whit Bissell were cast regulars in The Time Tunnel, regularly working together on the tunnel set. Bissell also appeared in the 1960 film adaptation of H.G. Wells' novel.
