= List of listed buildings in Dailly, South Ayrshire =

This is a list of listed buildings in the parish of Dailly in South Ayrshire, Scotland.

== List ==
Name	Location	Date Listed	Grid Ref. (Note: Sometimes known as OSGB36, the grid reference (where provided) is based on the British national grid reference system used by the Ordnance Survey. • "Guide to National Grid". Ordnance Survey. • "Get-a-map". Ordnance Survey.)	Geo-coordinates	Notes	LB Number (Note: Historic Environment Scotland assign a unique alphanumeric identifier to each designated site in Scotland, for listed buildings this always begins with "LB", for example "LB12345".)	Image
Lochmodie Cottages (3 Dwellings)				55°17′05″N 4°44′00″W	Category C(S)	1144	Upload Photo
Penkill Farm				55°15′01″N 4°47′01″W	Category C(S)	1147	Upload Photo
Woodside, Formerly Old Kennels				55°17′37″N 4°41′05″W	Category B	1116	Upload Photo
Greenhead Hotel And Adjoining 2 Dwellings Next To Church				55°16′41″N 4°43′29″W	Category C(S)	1141	Upload Photo
Bargany House				55°15′54″N 4°45′55″W	Category A	1171	Upload another image
Stables Killochan Castle				55°15′55″N 4°47′30″W	Category A	1174	Upload Photo
Aird Bridge				55°17′40″N 4°41′23″W	Category B	1118	Upload Photo
Parish Church Of New Dailly And Churchyard				55°16′41″N 4°43′27″W	Category B	1139	Upload Photo
Manse				55°16′45″N 4°43′17″W	Category B	1140	Upload Photo
Old Dailly Church And Churchyard				55°15′22″N 4°47′38″W	Category B	1149	Upload Photo
Brunston Castle				55°16′26″N 4°44′21″W	Category B	6705	Upload Photo
Craighead Farm				55°16′26″N 4°46′41″W	Category C(S)	1143	Upload Photo
Hawkhill				55°15′39″N 4°47′19″W	Category B	1145	Upload Photo
Penkill Castle				55°14′57″N 4°47′01″W	Category A	1148	Upload Photo
Castle Ailsa Craig				55°15′00″N 5°06′46″W	Category B	1150	Upload Photo
Duke's Bridge				55°15′58″N 4°45′56″W	Category B	1172	Upload Photo
Killochan Castle				55°15′54″N 4°47′30″W	Category A	1173	Upload another image See more images
Kilkerran				55°17′32″N 4°40′18″W	Category A	1114	Upload Photo
Drumgirnan Bridge				55°18′10″N 4°40′14″W	Category B	1117	Upload Photo
Kilkerran Castle				55°16′09″N 4°41′17″W	Category B	126	Upload Photo
Lighthouse Ailsa Craig				55°15′07″N 5°06′31″W	Category B	1151	Upload Photo
Icehouse				55°17′28″N 4°40′18″W	Category C(S)	1115	Upload Photo
Drumburle				55°17′32″N 4°41′44″W	Category A	1119	Upload Photo
"Gigmagog" Formerly Mains Cottage				55°17′34″N 4°41′28″W	Category B	1120	Upload Photo
Dalquharran Castle (Ruin)				55°16′50″N 4°43′17″W	Category A	1142	Upload Photo
Maxwellston				55°15′58″N 4°44′11″W	Category C(S)	1146	Upload Photo
Dalquharran Castle Including Stable Range				55°16′59″N 4°43′29″W	Category A	125	Upload Photo

== Key ==
The scheme for classifying buildings in Scotland is:

- Category A: "buildings of national or international importance, either architectural or historic; or fine, little-altered examples of some particular period, style or building type."
- Category B: "buildings of regional or more than local importance; or major examples of some particular period, style or building type, which may have been altered."
- Category C: "buildings of local importance; lesser examples of any period, style, or building type, as originally constructed or moderately altered; and simple traditional buildings which group well with other listed buildings."

In March 2016 there were 47,288 listed buildings in Scotland. Of these, 8% were Category A, and 50% were Category B, with the remaining 42% being Category C.
