= I'm Here to Help =

Album by Craig Ferguson

Live album by Craig Ferguson
- Released: July 23, 2013
- Recorded: November 2012; Warner Theatre in Washington, D.C.
- Genre: Comedy
- Length: 76:45
- Label: New Wave Dynamics; Green Mountain West
- Producer: Craig Ferguson; Phil Cottone; Ian Kornbluth

Craig Ferguson chronology
Does This Need to Be Said? (2011)	I'm Here to Help (2013)

I'm Here to Help is the fifth comedy album and third DVD-comedy album by Scottish-American comedian Craig Ferguson. This live audio recording is from the film Craig Ferguson: I'm Here to Help, released on January 1, 2013, originally recorded in 2012 at the Warner Theatre.

Professional ratings
Review scores
Source	Rating
Allmusic	4/5 stars

== Track listing ==
No.	Title	Length
1.	"Great Day for America"	7:06
2.	"Took Too Much Acid After 12 Pints of Guinness"	3:28
3.	"I Don't Do Drugs"	2:30
4.	"Trouble"	2:39
5.	"British Accented Romans"	3:01
6.	"Hitler's Assets"	4:24
7.	"Transgender Community"	6:15
8.	"Bad Karma"	2:05
9.	"Brangelina & Jennifer - Who Cares?"	4:35
10.	"Hitler the Vegetarian & Mel Gibson"	3:38
11.	"Rehab"	4:56
12.	"Weird Hollywood Ideas"	3:35
13.	"Aura Massages"	5:22
14.	"Blindness Cures"	1:30
15.	"Romanticizing the Past"	2:54
16.	"Shark Week"	6:44
17.	"2 Penises"	2:00
18.	"Nature Documentaries"	2:57
19.	"Seatfillers"	2:26
20.	"Having Kids"	3:02
21.	"Traveling Salesman Joke"	1:38

== Award and nominations ==
The album was nominated for Best Comedy Album at the 56th Grammy Awards.

== Charts ==
Chart (2013)	Peak position
US Billboard Top Comedy Albums	6
