= Nacelleverse =

American media franchise and shared universe

- Created by: Brian Volk-Weiss
- Original work: Nacelleverse #0 (2024)
- Owner: The Nacelle Company
- Years: 2024–present

Official website
- www.nacellestore.com

The Nacelleverse (Note: Also stylized as NacelleVerse.) is an ongoing American transmedia franchise and shared fictional universe created by Brian Volk-Weiss and presented by The Nacelle Company. It features several lines of comics, cartoons and toys based on several brands from the 1960s-1990s that the company has acquired the rights to.

== Development history ==
The Nacelleverse was created in 2024 by Brian Volk-Weiss, the founder of The Nacelle Company which acquired the rights of several intellectual properties from the 1960s-1990s to create their own shared universe. The mainline comic books are being written by Melissa Flores and published by Oni Press, with animated TV adaptations under development and toylines that are currently available.

== Intellectual properties ==
Each of these franchises is divided by phases and seasons.

Season	Intellectual property	Debut year	Creator(s)	Previous owner(s)
Phase 1 (2024–present)
1	RoboForce	1984	Morris and Rose Michtom	Ideal Toy Company (Mattel) and Toyfinity
2	Biker Mice from Mars	1993	Rick Ungar	Brentwood Television Funnies
3	Sectaurs: Warriors of Symbion	1985	Tim Clarke, Lawrence Mass and Maureen Trotto	Coleco
4	The Great Garloo	1961	Louis Marx	Louis Marx and Company
5	Wild West C.O.W.-Boys of Moo Mesa	1992	Ryan Brown	Hasbro and The Walt Disney Company
6	Power Lords	1983	Wayne Barlowe, Len Mayem and Ned Strongin	Revell and Four Horsemen Studios
7	Barnyard Commandos	1989	James Groman	CloudCo and Playmates Toys

== Comic books ==
The comics are being overseen by Melissa Flores and published by Oni Press.

=== Ongoing series ===
Title / Issues	Writers	Artists	Colorists	Debut date	Conclusion date
Biker Mice from Mars Vol. 2 #1–	Melissa Flores	Daniel Gete		June 25, 2025	TBA

=== Limited series ===
Title / Issues	Writers	Artists	Colorists	Debut date	Conclusion date
RoboForce	Melissa Flores	Julio Brilha, Marcelo Di Chiara; Diógenes Neves and Elton Thomasi	Jão Canola	April 30, 2024	July 3, 2024
Biker Mice from Mars Vol. 1 #1–3	Melissa Flores	Francis Portela		July 17, 2024	September 18, 2024
Sectaurs: Warriors of Symbion #1–3	Dennis Culver	Ramon Bachs	Manoli Martinez	October 23, 2024	December 18, 2024
Power Lords #1–3	Dennis Culver	V. Ken Marion		January 29, 2025	March 26, 2025
Wild West C.O.W.-Boys of Moo Mesa #1–4	Matt Hotson	Juan Gedeon		September 17, 2025	December, 2025
Biker Mice from Mars: Scorch #1–	Matt Hotson	V. Ken Marion		August 12, 2026	TBA

=== One-shots ===
Title	Writers	Artists	Colorists	Debut date
Nacelleverse #0	Melissa Flores	Rahmat Handoko, Rhoald Marcellius; Diógenes Neves and Francis Portela	Jão Canola	March 19, 2024
The Great Garloo #0	Leon Reiser	A. J. Jothikumar		April 30, 2025

=== Non-canon ===
Title / Issues	Writers	Artist(s)	Colorist(s)	Debut date	Conclusion date
Judge Dredd/Biker Mice From Mars #1–2	Dan Watters and Ryan O'Sullivan	Jordi Tarragona	TBA	December 2026	January 2027
Biker Mice from Mars: Toxic Earth	TBA				

== Animated TV series ==
Series	Season	Release date	Director	Writers	Executive producers	Production companies	Distribution company	Channel
RoboForce	1	April 12, 2025	Brian Volk-Weiss	Gavin Hignight; Tom Stern	Dany Garcia; Dwayne Johnson	Cartoon Conrad; Seven Bucks Productions	GRB Studios	Tubi
Biker Mice from Mars	TBA	TBA	TBA	TBA	Ryan Reynolds	Maximum Effort	TBA	FuboTV
Barnyard Commandos	TBA	TBA	TBA	TBA	TBA	TBA	TBA	TBA

== Toylines ==
- Barnyard Commandos
- Biker Mice from Mars
  - Biker Mice from Mars Sports Bro's
- The Great Garloo
- RoboForce
- Sectaurs
- Wild West C.O.W.-Boys of Moo Mesa
