= Robo Force (toy line) =

Toyline

Robo Force (also rendered as RoboForce) is a toyline originally released by the Ideal Toy Company in 1984. The line was revived in 2013 by new rights holder Toyfinity. The line was sold from Toyfinity to The Nacelle Company in 2021.

== Characters ==
=== ROBO Force ===
- Maxx Steele: The Leader/Maxx Zero is one of the toughest robots and almost invulnerable. Armed with a pair of laser hand weapons stored in his backpack and a back-mounted, swiveling, double-barreled attack gun, he is hard to beat when against Hun-Dred's army of evil robots. His motto "Any mission, any time, any place" shows his team that he is determined to win the fight against Hun-Dred no matter what stands in his way. He was renamed Maxx Zero when the toyline was revived.
- Blazer: The Ignitor is a powerful robot whose weapons include a nozzles that can shoot out boiling hot plasma, which can melt the hardest of steel and on his head is a cryogenic water cannon that can extinguish the flames he creates so his fire does not burn and destroy everything in sight.
- Coptor: The Enforcer is the team's acrobat robot who always zooms by using the propeller on his head. Weapons he carries are two laser guns and a communicator that can contact Max Steele or any of the other robots from anyplace far away. Digging is even possible with the aid of his propeller. Coptor is the oldest of the good robots and was built by Dr. Fury.
- Sentinel: The Protector is always ready to hop into combat. With a permanent laser gun in his head that he can use anytime, he never runs out of weapons. He also stores two other weapons in his backpack just in case the battle gets tough.
- Wrecker: The Demolisher is a construction worker in his civilian life but in Maxx Steele's army he is the team's demolitionist. A fortress would easily crumble if Wrecker was sent to destroy it. His weapons are an atomic jackhammer and a laser drill. He also stores a metal-alloy wrecking hook.
- S.O.T.A.: The Creator is a professor when he is not on Robo Force missions, but when he is serving Max Steele he is a calm and always in control senior councilor. His name stands for State of the art which gives a clue about his superior intellect. He has an information-collection dish on his backpack which gives him radar, sonar, and extended hearing along with infra-red, microscopic, and telescopic vision. He also carries a drill which can be used for crafting and battle while an accurate laser targeting weapon is stored in his head.
- Vanguard: The Protector is the brother of Sentinel and he can combine with Maxx Zero to form Dreadnought Maxx Zero.

=== Cult of Dred ===
- Hun-Dred: The Conqueror is a robot who leads the evil robot empire. His weapons include laser guns, crushers instead of hands, twin hand-held attack weapons, and laser shooters that he uses for artillery. He also has the ability to sense fear in any being and destroys anyone or anything that stands in his way.
- Enemy: The Dictator is a vicious robot and uses a rear-mounted retro-fire assault-gun, which can reduce an entire world to atoms with one shot. He also mounts twin laser weapons in his chest-compartment.
- Cruel: The Detonator is a robot who uses a crusher-grapplers to destroy anything which opposes him. Practically indestructible, his quiet demeanor belies his heinous acts. He has twin communication antennae on either side of his head and this keeps him in touch with others over long distances.
- Vulgar: The Destroyer is charged with evil dark forces that make up his body and puts his sinister abilities to use. His strength comes from a mixture of science and wickedness. He is a gray, black, and red being with a large rotating head and villainous-looking eyes. He wields many weapons including a drill bit located in the back of his head which is sharp and dangerous to Max Steele's army of good robots. Vulgar also carries a deadly loaded mace blaster that he can hit targets with high accuracy.
- Nazgar the Invincible was an evil dictator that conquered the planet Zeton 2,000 years prior. His brain was preserved by the Cult of Dred. Hun-Dred kidnaps Dr. Fury, an expert in cyborg technology, to construct a robotic body for Nazgar.
- Battlestar: The Guardian is the guardian of Celestia, who protects Nazgar and Hun-Dred from the Robo Force.

== Toys ==
=== Ideal Toy Company ===
The original toyline featured robot action figures with suction cup bases and "crusher arm" action. In addition, each figure, which basically resembled a customized Dalek, also included another gimmick or two such as a hook or extendable guns. Besides action figures, there was also an Electronic Maxx Steele Programmable Robot and a Maxx Steele Erector Set released.

==== Figures ====
Robo Force

- Maxx Steele - The Leader
- Blazer - The Ignitor
- Coptor - The Enforcer
- Sentinel - The Protector
- Wrecker - The Demolisher
- S.O.T.A. - The Creator

Cult of Dred

- Hun-Dred - The Conqueror
- Enemy - The Dictator
- Cruel - The Detonator
- Vulgar - The Destroyer

==== Vehicles and playsets ====
- Robocruiser Robot Defender Vehicle
- Dred Crawler Robot Attack Vehicle
- Command Patroller
- Fortress of Steele playset

==== Other merchandise ====
In 1984, Ideal released a Robo Force board game, labeled a "SuperPopomatic 3-D Action Game".

==== Unreleased ====
While the figures were developed up to the product catalog photo stage, they were not released before the original line came to an end. A few early production Tiltor sample figures have pop up over the years and gotten into the hands of collectors.

Robo Force

- Tiltor - The Changer
- Opticon - The Interceptor
- Ripper - The Anti-Robot
- Mark Fury
- Deena Strong

Cult of Dred

- Plundor - The Pulverizer
- Fangar - The Conspirator
- Arsenal - The Devastator
- Nazgar the Tyrant

Vehicles and playsets

- Triad Three-Way Attack Vehicle
- Transblaster Laser Lift Cannon

=== Toyfinity ===
In 2013, Toyfinity acquired the rights to Robo Force line, along with former Ideal lines Rocks & Bugs & Things, Zeroids, and Manglor. The Robo Force line was sold to Nacelle in 2021 while the other former Ideal lines were retained by Toyfinity. Compatible with the Glyos System Series designed by Onell Design, the Robo Force kits feature 41 or more pieces a figure which can be arranged and re-arranged in any way the user sees fit. The new line was launched at New York Comic Con with a limited run Maxx Zero: Genesis Edition figure. Some figures received more than one edition to go along with the developing storyline featured in the Robo Force comic book. By 2018 two additional Robo Force kits had been introduced offering additional parts to create Zeroids and more members of the original Robo Force line-up.

==== Toyfinity figures ====
The original Robo Force mold was released in 2013 as Maxx Zero Genesis Edition. It contained 41 parts inspired by Enemy, Hun-Dred, Maxx Zero and Sentinel. It could be assembled in a variety of configurations which included articulated legs and tank treads. Paint and additional parts were used to create numerous other characters.

A new Robo Force mold was released in 2018 as Zetonian Proto Enforcer. Made up of 26 parts inspired by Coptor and S.O.T.A. among others, this design featured a round body and a suction-cup-like base.

Several toy figures in Robo Force line were released between 2013 and 2021:

Robo Force

- Maxx Zero: The Leader
  - Genesis Edition: Dark grey with minimal black paint applications.
  - Glyaxia Disguise: Yellow and extra blue parts with blue and black paint applications. It can also be used to make Protector-Class Glyaxia Drones and Elite Drones.
  - Blank Edition: Light grey with no paint for customization.
  - Classic Edition: Light grey with paint details to match the vintage toy.
  - Ultimate Edition: Light grey with line details and over 100 paint applications.
  - Imperious Edition: Gold with line details and multiple paint applications.
  - Stealth Special Edition: Colorless clear with four additional painted bonus pieces.
  - Zeroid Edition: Grey with paint applications and new tampos. It can be combined with Zeroids' Zintar to make Super Zeroid.
  - Zobor Edition: Metallic copper with paint applications and tampos. It can be combined with Zeroids' Zobor to make Super Zeroid Zobor.
  - Metallic Copper Blank
  - Destroyer Edition: Classic deep blue with paint applications and tampos. It combines with Zeroids' Zerak to make Super Destroyer.
  - Solar Star Team Edition: Hunter orange with paint applications and tampos.
  - Original Edition: Light grey with paint details to match the vintage toy.
  - F.L.A.S.H. Edition: Army Green with paint applications and tampos.
  - Final Edition: Light grey with paint details to match the vintage toy.
- Sentinel: The Protector
  - Hunter Edition: Silver with black and white paint applications.
  - Blank Edition: White with no paint for customization.
  - Classic Edition: White with paint details to match the vintage toy.
- Wrecker: The Demolisher
  - Deluxe Genesis Edition: Glow-in-the-dark with teal and white paint applications.
- Vanguard: The Protector
  - Dynagenesis Origin: A new character who is Sentinel's brother, Vanguard was the result of three Glyaxia Protector drones being fused together into one robot. It can be combined with Maxx Zero to form Dreadnaught Maxx Zero. The figure has orange color with over 20 paint applications.
- S.O.T.A.: The Creator
  - Zetonian Edition: Light blue with classic tampo and paint applications.
- Coptor: The Enforcer
  - Zetonian Edition: Dark blue with classic tampo and paint applications.
- Blazer: The Ignitor
  - Classic Edition: Grey with classic tampo and paint details to match the vintage toy.

Cult of Dred

- Enemy: The Dictator
  - Origin Edition: Dark blue with extra light blue parts with over 50 paint applications. It can also make Acromaxx.
- Hun-Dred: The Conqueror
  - Reforged Edition: Red with over 50 paint applications.
  - Classic Edition: Black with paint details to match the vintage toy. It can also make Dred-Maxx.
- Battlestar: The Guardian
  - Forging Edition: Black with silver paint applications.
- Fangar: The Conspirator
  - Predanaut Edition: A 3D printed figure created as a collaboration between Toyfinity and Mecha Zone.
- Cruel: The Detonator
  - Blank Edition: Red with no paint for customization.
  - Basic Edition: Red with extra black parts and paint details to match the vintage toy.
  - Ultimate Edition: Red with extra black parts along with line details and paint applications to match other Ultimate editions.
- Vulgar: The Destroyer
  - Zetonian Edition: Dark red with classic tampo and paint applications.
- Brutal: The Activator
  - Blank Edition: Purple with no paint for customization.
  - Ultimate Edition: Purple with extra black parts along with line details and paint applications to match other Ultimate editions.
- Nazgar: The Tyrant
  - Super Zeroid Black and Technician Zeroid with secret Nazgar the Tyrant hidden mode, with metallic black with red paint applications.
  - Regal Edition: The brain of Nazgar the Tyrant in gold that can be combined with any Robo Force and Zeroids kits.
  - Powered Up Edition: Black with paint details and tampos to match the vintage prototype toy.
  - Final Edition: Black with paint details to match the vintage toy.
- Nazarran
  - Metallic Black Edition: Brain creatures of Nazgar in black.
  - Metallic Red Edition: Brain creatures of Nazgar in red black.
  - Grey Edition: Brain creatures of Nazgar in grey black.
  - Stealth Edition: Brain creatures of Nazgar in translucent clear.
  - Metallic Copper Edition: Brain creatures of Nazgar in bronze.
  - Blue Edition: Brain creatures of Nazgar in blue.
- Dred Trooper
  - Cult of Hun-Dred Edition: Nazgar's loyal army of Callgrim-trained soldiers in red.
- Zetonians
  - Zetonian Dark: Black with minimal red paint applications, it can be combined with Nazgar to make Ultimate Nazgar. 26 parts.

Zetonians
Modern Zeroids-based mechanical beings from the lost outpost of Andor. New body features a circular design to mimic the suction cup look of the original line. It is a joint design between Toyfinity and Onell Design.

- Zetonian Proto Enforcer: White with minimal black paint applications.

== Robo Force: The Revenge of Nazgar ==
In 1984, Ruby-Spears Productions released an American animated adaptation of the series in the form of a one-shot special called Robo Force: The Revenge of Nazgar. Michael Hack provided voice direction with Flint Dille writing and Ron Jones composing the music.

=== Synopsis ===
A scientist named Dr. Fury and his family are in his house with Coptor. Suddenly, the evil robots led by Hun-Dred blast their way into his house. Coptor fires on the evil robots, but is defeated. The scientist is abducted by the evil robots for his research on putting human brains into robots. Hun-Dred and his crew would like Dr. Fury to do this for the evil Nazgar, who created trouble for the scientist's planet nearly two-thousand years ago.

Ten years later, a repaired Coptor and Dr. Fury's son (Mark Fury) along with new robots like Maxx Steele created by Mark go on a mission to find his father.

The final battle occurs in Nazgar's headquarters. Nazgar (whose brain is now in a robot body) seemingly escapes, Hun-Dred and a laser gun meant to wreak havoc on the planet are destroyed by Maxx Steele and Dr. Fury is saved.

=== Cast ===
- Michael Bell - Cruel
- Rodger Bumpass - Mark Fury
- Arthur Burghardt - Nazgar, Sentinel
- Peter Cullen - Coptor, Vulgar
- Ron Feinberg - Hun-Dred
- David Mendenhall - Jason Fury
- Robert Ridgely - Maxx Steele, Councilman Frost
- Neil Ross - Blazer
- John Stephenson - Dr. Richard Fury
- B. J. Ward - Deena Strong
- Alan Young - S.O.T.A.

=== DVD release ===
The animated Robo Force adaptation was released by Warner Archive as a special feature for the volume 2 DVD release of Challenge of the GoBots on March 10, 2015. This is its first home video release.

== Robo Force: The Animated Series ==
An animated series adaptation of Robo Force toyline was released in April 2025 on Tubi. The series was developed by The Nacelle Company, who acquired the rights to the toyline in 2021.

=== RoboForce: The Animated Series ===
==== Voice cast ====
- Bryan W. Adams - Mr. Destruction
- Russ Akin - Comm Operator
- Dave Beynon - Wrecker
- Kelly Bingham - Silas Duke
- Jack Chisholm - Nima Tannhauser
- Kris Cipriani - Blazer
- Chris Coculuzzi - Maxx 89
- Dan Eardley - Injured SkySend Employee
- Benjamin J. Frost - SkySend Elevator Operator
- Jordan Q. Hammer - Flight Attendant
- Gavin Hignight - Detonator
- Callum Hollett - Utopia Aegis 101 Bots
- Heather Jansma - S.O.T.A. 89, S.O.T.A. 64
- Jaime Eliezer Karas - SkySend Elevator Automated Voice, Submarine Autopilot, U.U.A Enforcer Autopilot
- Matt Kravitsky - Broken U.U.A. Enforcer Console
- Dan Larson - Mr. Blatz
- Colleen MacIsaac - Utopia Aegis 101 Bots
- Rory McCormick - Coptor
- Andre Meadows - Dad with Children
- Keith Morrison - Big Loo
- Katherine Norris - Sentinel
- Daniel Nwobi - Hun-Dred
- Dave Polloi - Substation Automated Voice
- Adam Jonas Segaller - Crmgn
- Julee Song - Soraya Aviram
- Holly Stevens - Deneeen Baral
- Paul Stripling - Reporter
- Shannon Stripling - Businesswoman
- Brian Volk-Weiss - Tiltor

==== Episode list ====
No. in season	Title	Written by	Original release date
1	"Rebooted, Rewired, and Ready to Go"	Gavin Hignight; Tom Stern; Brian Volk-Weiss	April 12, 2025
2	"Way Down Below"	Gavin Hignight; Tom Stern; Brian Volk-Weiss	April 12, 2025
3	"The Search for S.O.T.A"	Gavin Hignight; Brian Volk-Weiss	April 12, 2025
4	"Journey to the Center of Maxx"	Tom Stern; Brian Volk-Weiss	April 12, 2025
5	"To Break These Earthly Bounds"	Gavin Hignight; Brian Volk-Weiss	April 12, 2025
6	"Today Detroit, Tomorrow the World"	Gavin Hignight; Tom Stern; Brian Volk-Weiss	April 12, 2025

== Comic books ==
In 1984, three mini-comics were given away with Robo Force toys - Robo Force: Assault on the Fortress of Steele!, Robo Force: Menace of the Heat Ray, and Robo Force: Showdown in Space!

Robo Force has been featured in the Nacelleverse line of comics published by Oni Press beginning in 2024.
