= Babyface =

Babyface or Baby Face may refer to:

== Nicknames ==
- Lester Joseph Gillis a.k.a. Baby Face Nelson (1908–1934), American 1930s bank robber
- "Baby Face", Jimmy McLarnin (1907–2004), Irish two-time welterweight boxing world champion
- "Baby Face", the Baldwin DR-4-4-15 locomotive

== Music ==
=== Musical artists ===
- Babyface (musician), stage name of Kenneth Edmonds (born 1959), American R&B and pop songwriter, record producer and singer
- Babyface, rhythm guitarist for Thee Faction
- Babyface, the former name of rock band Axe (band)
- Roosevelt "Baby Face" Willette (1933–1971), American hard bop and soul-jazz musician

=== Songs ===
- "Babyface" (song), a song by U2
- "Baby Face" (song), 1926 song with music by Harry Akst and lyrics by Benny Davis, sung by Jan Garber the same year
- "Baby Face", a song by Jolin Tsai for the 2000 album Show Your Love

== Fictional characters ==
- Baby-Face Finster, a criminal disguised as a baby in the Merrie Melodies animated short film Baby Buggy Bunny
- Babyface, a character in the movie Toy Story
- Baby Face Finlayson, a character in the British comic The Beano
- Baby Face, a character in the video game Dynamite Headdy
- Babyface Beagle, one of the Beagle Boys from the Scrooge McDuck universe
- Baby Face Gang, a literally baby-faced gang boss from the television series Batman: The Brave and the Bold
- Baby Face, a character in the movie The Hills Run Red from 2009
- Baby Face, a character in the movie and musicals Bugsy Malone
- Babyface Boretti, a villain character in the film Scooby-Doo! Camp Scare

== Other uses ==
- Baby Face (film), a 1933 film starring Barbara Stanwyck
- Baby Face (toy), an American brand of baby dolls that were manufactured by Galoob in 1990–1991
- Face (professional wrestling), or babyface, a wrestler or character who is portrayed as a "good guy"
- A face displaying cuteness
- A face displaying neoteny

== See also ==
- Baby-faced Assassin (disambiguation)
- "Babyface Killer", nickname of Chow Yun-fat (born 1955), Hong Kong actor
- "The Baby-Faced Assassin", nickname of Ole Gunnar Solskjær (born 1973), Norwegian football manager and former player, the latter mainly with Manchester United
