= Zeroids =

Line of toy robots by the Ideal Toy Company

The Zeroids are a line of toy robots that were introduced by the Ideal Toy Company in 1967 and re-licensed by Toyfinity in 2013 along with the later "STAR Team" revival. Consisting of Zerak, Zintar and Zobor, the Zeroids powered their way into the imaginations of young boys for nearly a decade.

1968 comic book advertisement

Zeroid robots were powered by a small DC electric motor that could be removed. These DC motors appeared as the brand name "Motorific" in Ideal Corp racing slot cars, and "Boaterific" powered scale motorboats.

== Description ==
The original sales pitch read: "Moving across the landscape, overrunning all obstacles as inexorably as the Future itself, these amazing, efficient and powerful automatons have but one purpose - to serve their masters at work and play!"

The storage cases in which the robots came could be used for other purposes. The robots were battery operated, and had wheels with rubber treads to propel themselves across the floor. There was a bottom mounted reversing switch that would allow the robot to reverse when it touched a special plastic plate, or turn the robot off, when in backed up into its display case.

Zerak, the blue robot, was originally the "commander" of the three robots. Zerak came with hook hands, and interchangeable magnetic hand and a throwing cup hand. Zerak's right arm could be cocked, and made to throw objects.

Zobor, the "Bronze" Robot, could "transport" lightweight items in his storage case, which could be "transformed" into a wagon due to having wheels attached to it. The case/wagon could be latched to a hook on Zobor's base. Zobor had a throwing arm and special spring-loaded plier type clamp hands.

Zintar, the silver "explorer", could use his storage case as a sled-like vehicle, which was propelled by his own treads. Zintar had a throwing arm and special hands with spring-loaded opposable thumbs. Zintar was cast in both a silver sparkled plastic and also in plain light gray plastic.

Later, "Zogg", a green robot was added to the set, and replaced Zerak as the commander of the zeroids. Zogg had powered drive treds, and was the first zeroid with an internal light bulb. Zogg did not have a throwing arm. Zogg had a sophisticated-looking "station" which had movable parts, activated by Zogg's metal "hands" completing an electric circuit. The station had, among other things, a "radar" that would rotate, and a spiral design 'monitor" which would spin when Zogg would complete the electric circuit.

An "Action Set" was available with a Missile Defense Pad, launching station, and included a "Solar Cycle" hollow wheel, into which the zeroid robot could be set inside.

The Zeroid alien robot was a box shaped robot with a clear dome head and powered drive. It had changeable internal nylon gears that would alter the robots movements with pre-programmed patterns. One pattern ended with the robots "exploding" with the arms and parts springing off.

There was a brief distribution of a Zeroid flying saucer called the ZEM XXI Explorer Module, cast in yellow and purple, or yellow and green, with a full sized powered Zeroid inside.

Zeroids were later packaged without their case, on a bubble card with and without a solar cycle.

Foreign distribution (U.K.) of Zeroids included a figure called Zemo, a composite robot with a Zintar head, Zerak chest and Zobor body. Zemo was sold in a wagon type carry case similar to the Zobor robot. Zemo was cast in aqua, red or orange-yellow plastic versions. Only twelve promotional Zemo's were ever manufactured with names printed on them. These were all aqua in colour and given as gifts to senior staff. A few made their way into general distribution in the U.K. and are considered by Zeroid collectors to be the "Holiest of Holy Grails". Only two intact examples are still known to exist.

== Late 1970s "Star Team" revival ==
Zeroids returned to the shelves in the late 1970s, renamed "Star Team", to capitalize on the success of Star Wars.

The Star Team line featured the "Zeroid Pilot", a smaller R2-D2-style dome-headed robot. Made from the lower body mold of the Zogg figure, it did not have the motorific DC drive motor. The batteries only powered a dome light. The "Pilot" was cast in silver plastic, in red or blue trim, and without the electronic contacts in the arms.

The ZEM XXI Flying Saucer was re-issued as the "Star Hawk" in red and grey plastic, with a non-powered Zeroid with red trim.

The other star team robot was a humanoid "Zem 21" green-headed silver-bodied figure that bore some resemblance to C-3PO. They fought the Darth-Vader-esque "Knight of Darkness", which was an Ideal Captain Action body molded in black.

== 2010 Moonstone Books revival ==
In 2010, the Zeroids returned in the pages of Moonstone Books' original comic book series in association with Captain Action Enterprises. The story follows Zeroids who return to Earth in their attempt to find a descendant of their creator Profesor Zero, while also helping Destiny Zero in liberating her world from alien Shadow Raiders and evil Zombies.

== 2016 Toyfinity revival ==
As part of their licensing package in 2013, Toyfinity acquired the rights to Robo Force, Manglors, Rocks & Bugs & Things, and Zeroids/STAR Team from former Ideal Toy Company. Compatible with the Glyos System Series designed by Onell Design, the kits mixed Robo Force kits featuring 41 or more pieces with Zeroids kits featuring 16 or more pieces with a figure which can be arranged and re-arranged in any way the user sees fit. In the storyline for this revival, key philosophical differences between Zintar and Zerak, without the firm claws of Commander Zogg to guide them, have led to different evolutionary paths for these mechanical wonders. The tribes of the Prime Zeroids have gone their own ways, interacting very little over the interceding years. Guidance under the gaze of Zintar pushed their advancement into Neo Zeroids.

With the defeat of Nazgar the Tyrant & The Knight of Darkness thanks to the help of Maxx Zero, Zintar has taken up the mission to locate their missing leader: Commander Zogg. Assembling a new Zobor and Zerak for assistance along with a newly configured Zeroid Drone for special mission abilities, they set off to find the final classic teammate of the original line, but the mission is quickly sidetracked with the discovery of the Manglors of planet Uzalek.

Several toy figures were released between 2013 and 2024.

=== Figures ===
Zeroids

- Ancient Constructs: Ancient mechanical beings from beyond the stars.
  - Creator: A Gold deluxe figure with no paint applications.
  - Worker: A Bronze deluxe figure with no paint applications.
- Nazgar - The Tyrant
  - Super Zeroid Black and Technician Zeroid with secret NAZGAR the TYRANT hidden mode, metallic black with Red paint applications.
  - Powered Up Nazgar: Black with Red paint applications.
  - Uzalek-Blood Infused Nazgar: Black with Pink paint applications.
- Zeroid Striker: Metallic black with Red paint applications.
- Phospectre Parakonan: Glow-in-the-Dark Green with several paint applications.
- Phospectre Zerkanoid Questionian Bytes: Glow-in-the-Dark Green with several paint applications.
- Zeroid Drone
  - Zintar Edition: Grey with several paint applications.

Neo Zeroids

- Neo Zeroid Assassin: Metallic Black with Red paint applications.
- Neo Zeroid Hunter: Crimson Red with Black paint applications.
- Neo Zeroid Protector: White with Black paint applications.
- Neo Zeroid Stealth: Clear with no paint applications and bonus Nazareen brain.
- Neo Zeroid Zintar: Grey with several paint applications and new tampos. It can be combined with Robo Force's Maxx Zeroid to make Super Zeroid.
- Neo Zeroid Zobor: Metallic Copper with several paint applications and new tampos. It can combined with Robo Force's Maxx Zobor to make Super Zeroid Zobor.
  - Zobor Mark II Mini Zeroid: Orange with several paint applications and tampos.
- Neo Zeroid Zerak: Classic Deep Blue with several paint applications and new tampos. It can be combined with Robo Force's Destroyer Maxx Zero to make Super Destroyer.
  - Zerak Mark II Mini Zeroid: Blue with several paint applications and tampos.
- Neo Zeroid Zemo: Hunter Orange with several paint applications and tampos.
- Neo Zeroid M. Zeroid: Translucent neon pink with no paint applications.
- Neo Zeroid Zault: Aqua-Green with several paint applications and new tampo.
- Phospectre Neo Zeroid Buster: Glow-in-the-Dark Green with several paint applications.
- Cerulestar Neo Zeroid Explorer VIII: Glow-in-the-Dark Blue with several paint applications.
- Bloodstone Zeroid: Translucent Blood Red with no paint applications.
- Test Shot Zeroid: Pink Fleshtone with no paint applications.

Knight of Darkness and the Shadow Warriors

- Knight of Darkness
  - Special Crossover Edition: Black with Silver paint applications. Crossover edition with Onell Design.
  - Cult of Dred Edition: Black with Silver paint applications and multiple new tampos. Crossover edition with Onell Design.
- Knight of Illumination
  - Special Crossover Edition: White with Gold paint applications. Crossover edition with Onell Design.
- Darkness Soldier
  - Standard: Crimson Red with White paint applications.
  - Legion: White with Black paint applications.
  - Guardian: Black with Silver paint applications.
  - Destroyer: Classic Deep Blue with Black paint applications.
  - Solar Storm: Orange with White paint applications.
  - Bloodstone: Translucent Blood Red with White paint applications.
  - Metallic Copper: Metallic Copper with Silver paint applications. Head-only, the figure is used to enhance other figures such as Zobor, Maxx Zobor, and other Gendrone Union colorway figures.
