= Behind the Attraction =

American streaming documentary series

- Genre: Documentary
- Created by: Brian Volk-Weiss
- Directed by: Brian Volk-Weiss
- Narrated by: Paget Brewster
- Country of origin: United States
- Original language: English
- No. of series: 3
- No. of episodes: 18

Production
- Executive producers: Dwayne Johnson; Dany Garcia; Hiram Garcia; Brian Gewirtz; Kevin Hill; Brian Volk-Weiss; Robin Henry; Cisco Henson; Ian Roumain (S2); Frankie Chappiaerino (S2–3); Davina Dobrovech (S3); Savannah Goss (S3)
- Cinematography: Samuel Brownfield; Matt Kubas; John Paul Meyer
- Editors: Rachael Wax Taber; Jeff Cole; Benjamin J. Frost; James Kilton
- Production companies: Seven Bucks Productions; The Nacelle Company

Original release
- Network: Disney+
- Release: July 21, 2021 – present

Behind the Attraction is a documentary television series on Disney+ produced by Dwayne Johnson's Seven Bucks Productions and Brian Volk-Weiss's The Nacelle Company. The first five episodes were released on July 21, 2021, with the remaining five released on August 25, 2021. The documentary is narrated by Paget Brewster. The series features interviews with fans and Imagineers and analyzes the history, popularity and transformation of Disney attractions and destinations over time.

== Production ==
In October 2019, Disney+ ordered the docuseries from The Toys That Made Us creator and director, Brian Volk-Weiss. His production company, The Nacelle Company and Dwayne Johnson's Seven Bucks Productions, were attached as production houses.

In December 2021, Hiram Garcia confirmed plans to develop a second season for the series. Season two was officially announced on October 4, 2023 to be released on November 1, 2023.

In May 2026, it was announced that a third season for the series would be released on June 24, 2026, with two episodes exploring the Disney Cruise Line.

== Episodes ==
=== Series overview ===
Series overview
Season	Episodes		Originally released
1	10	5	July 21, 2021
1	10	5	August 25, 2021
2	6		November 1, 2023
3	2		June 24, 2026

=== Season 1 (2021) ===
No. overall	No. in season	Title	Directed by	Original release date
Part 1
1	1	"Jungle Cruise"	Brian Volk-Weiss	July 21, 2021
A history of how the Jungle Cruise was inspired by True-Life Adventures, how Marc Davis added humor to the ride, and Dwayne Johnson appears to promote the film based on the attraction.
2	2	"Haunted Mansion"	Brian Volk-Weiss	July 21, 2021
The Haunted Mansion was one of the last rides Walt Disney worked on before his death. This episode shows some behind-the-scenes conflicts on whether or not the ride should be scary or silly, as well as some of the technical challenges, and how the attraction is shown in different iterations in the parks around the world.
3	3	"Star Tours"	Brian Volk-Weiss	July 21, 2021
A young George Lucas was at Disneyland on its second day of operation. Almost thirty years later, the Disney company collaborated with Lucas for a new kind of simulator ride based on the Star Wars films. As the years go by, the attraction evolves into Star Tours: The Adventure Continues and makes way for Star Wars: Galaxy's Edge.
4	4	"The Twilight Zone Tower of Terror"	Brian Volk-Weiss	July 21, 2021
After Disney-MGM Studios opened in 1989, the park planned its first expansion to what would become Sunset Boulevard. This episode reveals how The Twilight Zone set the tone of the ride, as well as the challenges to program the elevator. As the popularity of the attraction grew, an entire new story and theme was created at Tokyo DisneySea and the attraction at Disney California Adventure gets a transformation to Guardians of the Galaxy – Mission: Breakout!.
5	5	"Space Mountain"	Brian Volk-Weiss	July 21, 2021
The creation of this thrill ride goes all the way back to the opening of the Matterhorn Bobsleds. The episode also explores Disneyland Paris incarnation, as well as how it served as the inspiration for Tron Lightcycle Power Run at Shanghai Disneyland, and has also since opened at Walt Disney World's Magic Kingdom.
Part 2
6	6	"The Castles"	Brian Volk-Weiss	August 25, 2021
The creation of the various icons of the Disney Parks is explored, beginning with Sleeping Beauty Castle in Disneyland, Cinderella Castle in the Magic Kingdom, Le Château de la Belle au Bois Dormant in Disneyland Paris, right down to the transformation of Hong Kong Disneyland's Sleeping Beauty Castle into the Castle of Magical Dreams.
7	7	"Disneyland Hotel"	Brian Volk-Weiss	August 25, 2021
The partnership between Walt Disney and Jack Wrather begins the opening of the original Disneyland Hotel in Anaheim. As time goes on, more amenities are added to the hotel, and with the opening of Walt Disney World comes even more options for resort hotels.
8	8	"It's a Small World"	Brian Volk-Weiss	August 25, 2021
While the "happiest cruise ever sailed" is a focal point, it is also a discussion on the evolution of Audio Animatronics in general, as well as Disney's contribution to the 1964 New York World's Fair.
9	9	"Transportation"	Brian Volk-Weiss	August 25, 2021
The various modes of transportation seen around the Disney Parks are discussed, including the railroad, the trams, as well as the monorail.
10	10	"Hall of Presidents"	Brian Volk-Weiss	August 25, 2021
This is a story of how a solitary lifelike animated figure of Abraham Lincoln, as well as the abandoned concept of Liberty Street in Disneyland, led to one of the most technologically advanced attractions in the parks.

=== Season 2 (2023) ===
No. overall	No. in season	Title	Directed by	Original release date
11	1	"Pirates of the Caribbean"	Brian Volk-Weiss	November 1, 2023
12	2	"Big Thunder Mountain Railroad"	Brian Volk-Weiss	November 1, 2023
13	3	"Indiana Jones Adventure"	Brian Volk-Weiss	November 1, 2023
14	4	"The Food"	Brian Volk-Weiss	November 1, 2023
15	5	"EPCOT"	Brian Volk-Weiss	November 1, 2023
16	6	"Nighttime Spectaculars"	Brian Volk-Weiss	November 1, 2023

=== Season 3 (2026) ===
No. overall	No. in season	Title	Directed by	Original release date
17	1	"Disney Cruise Line Origin Story"	Brian Volk-Weiss	June 24, 2026
18	2	"Disney Destiny"	Brian Volk-Weiss	June 24, 2026

== Release ==
All episodes of Behind the Attraction were initially scheduled to premiere on Disney+ on Friday, July 16, 2021. However, after the success of Loki on which premiered on a Wednesday, it was announced that the release dates for most original Disney+ series would be moved to Wednesdays. As a result, the series premiered its first five episodes on Wednesday, July 21, 2021. The remaining five episodes premiered on August 25, 2021.

== Controversy ==
On September 16, 2021, a statement of alleged plagiarism was raised to episode 4 of the series regarding The Twilight Zone Tower of Terror. A Canadian YouTube channel called Art of Engineering pointed out several similarities to their original artwork and animations (showing the ride's interpreted interior layout) created by Art of Engineering and used in "How Disney's Tower of Terror Works" which was published on YouTube in 2019. The animations used in the Disney+ series appeared to be traces of the 2019 diagrams, with the only major change being the series' use of an orange background, which may allegedly indicate awareness of the parallels to the channel's 2019 work and an attempt to conceal the act. Throughout the rest of the episode, a more standard blue background was utilized. Neither Disney nor Seven Bucks Productions, the company responsible for the series, have commented on the matter. However, the internet's reaction and US law seem to favor of the original 2019 work.

As of September 21, 2021, the matter was resolved. Brian Volk-Weiss "offered a genuine apology on behalf of Disney, Nacelle and Seven Bucks Productions." The episode's credits were edited so that Art of Engineering creator James St. Onge received a credit for "Tower of Terror Blueprint Graphic Design."

== See also ==
- The Imagineering Story
- The Toys That Made Us - similar in style and created by Brian Volk-Weiss
