= Four Horsemen Studios =

American Toy Company

Four Horsemen Toy Design Studios
- Type: Private corporation
- Industry: Toys
- Founded: 1999
- Founders: Jim Preziosi, Eric Treadaway, H. Eric “Cornboy” Mayse, and Christopher Dahlberg (who is no longer a member of Four Horsemen Studios)
- Headquarters: Little Falls, New Jersey, US
- Number of employees: 18 (2024)
- Website: www.sourcehorsemen.com

Four Horsemen Studios is a collectible figure design studio and manufacturer, specializing in creating sculptures of toys and action figures. The company was founded in the late 1990s as a contractor to Mattel, and have since grown to an independent studio creating their own lines of figures as well as manufacturing third party designs under license.

== History ==
The current members and co-owners of Four Horsemen studios are Jim Preziosi, Eric Treadway, and H. Eric “Cornboy” Mayse. The three met while employed as figure sculptors at McFarlane Toys. In September 1999, the three left McFarlane to found Four Horsemen Studios along with former partner, Chris Dahlberg, where, in a partnership with Mattel, they created hundreds of figures for Mattel's Masters of the Universe, The Dark Knight, Harry Potter, DC Universe Classics and Man of Steel toy lines, among others.

In 2005, Four Horsemen Studios began creating their own properties and designing and manufacturing the toys to support them. The studio has developed several in house properties including: Seventh Kingdom, Gothitropolis, Magma Corps, Symbiotech, and Mythic Legions

In early 2010, the Horsemen made the leap into licensed action figures. The studio signed a deal to produce figures based on the 1960s sci-fi toy line The Outer Space Men. A second license, 1980′s brand The Power Lords, was purchased in 2013.

=== Original lines ===
==== Seventh Kingdom ====
The first original line to make it into production, Seventh Kingdom's Xetheus won the first Fantastic Exclusive competition in 2005.

==== Magma CORPS ====
Magma CORPS was the second original line to see actual product. A vinyl figure of Argus a leader within the Mercury City police force was created in 2006.

==== Gothitropolis ====
The third original line to actually be produced as figures, Gothitropolis includes Scarabus, the Time Keepers, and all the members of the Raven Flocks via two kickstarters.

==== Symbiotech ====
The fourth original line, Symbiotech has yet to see any actual production but has down quite well over the years in Fan Ex voting. The line was announced as the next to go into production but has since been put on hold while licensed lines take precedence.

Symbiotech designs that have been shown to the public suggest a humanoid and beast character in symbiosis with each other. Each design had two figures that could combine or interact.

==== Mythic Legions ====
Mythic Legions is a fantasy line of action figures from Four Horsemen Studios. "The action figure line consists of an endless variety of characters ranging from heroic knights and dwarves to evil orcs and skeleton soldiers." The property started with a successful Kickstarter campaign in 2015 after the success of a campaign for Gothitropolis. Initially planned as a 1/18 scale line using the Glyos system of swappable parts, the line was changed to 1/12 scale, and the studio worked hard to maintain that interchangeability.

Wave 1

- Silver Knight Legion Builder
- Gold Knight Legion Builder
- Bronze Dwarf Legion Builder
- Silver Dwarf Legion Builder
- Standard Skeleton Legion Builder
- Golden Skeleton Legion Builder
- Sir Gideon Heavensbrand
- Gorgo Aetherblade
- Thord Ironjaw
- Skapular the Cryptbreaker
- Sir Galeron
- Orn Steelhide
- Clavian
- Attila Leossyr
- Sir Owain
- Jorund Runeshaper
- Tibius
- Otho
- Sir Ignatius
- Bothar Shadowhorn
- Carpathias
- Attlus the Conqueror
- Urkku
- Vitus
- Asterion
- Azhar
- Zazhar
- Urzokk
- Bog Goblin
- Malleus
- Kickstarter Exclusive Sir Valgard
- Orc Deluxe Legion Builder
- Barbarian Deluxe Legion Builder Set
- Weapons Packs 1-4
- Heroic Weapon Pack
- Evil Weapon Pack
- Mythic Legions Art Book
- Fan's Choice Figure - Vorgus Vermillius

At San Diego Comic-Con 2015, Four Horsemen Studios revealed the prototype of a Troll deluxe figure for Mythic Legions.

Wave 1.5

- Pixxus
- Sir Godfrey
- Ilgar
- Unkann
- Stone Troll
- Forest Troll

Wave 1.75 - Covenant of Shadow.

- Baron Volligar
- Gorthokk
- Torionn
- Cador
- Scaphold
- the Silverhorn Sentry
- the Templar Knight Legion Builder
- Deluxe Knight Builder Set

Four Horsemen Studios also released a wave of avian warriors, called Eathyron's Dozen.

- Eathyron
- Trumpetus
- Toucarr
- Scarletros
- Phoenicius
- Pelecus
- Osperus
- Drayleeon
- Cyanicus
- Colonel Domesticus
- Bubotros
- Archaeopterix
- Mallatard the Duck
- Eagalus

Four Horseman Studios launched a second successful Kickstarter campaign, Mythic Legions: Advent of Decay, in 2017.

Wave 2 -Advent of Decay

- Elf Legion Builder
- Vampire Legion Builder
- Steel Knight Legion Builder
- Iron Knight Legion Builder
- Gwendolynne Heavensbrand
- Calavius
- Lucretia
- Boarrior
- Lord Aydon
- B’alam
- Hagnon
- Myria Goldenbranch
- Vampire Knight
- Gryshaa the Slytherer
- Shadow Elf Warrior
- Delphina of Eathyross
- Fantastic Exclusive Winner
- Gadriel
- Deluxe Knight Builder 2
- Elf Legion Builder 6-pack
- Vampire Legion Builder 6-pack
- Steel Knight Legion Builder 6-pack
- Iron Knight Legion Builder 6-pack
- Orc Deluxe Legion Builder 2
- Orc Deluxe Legion Builder 2 6-Pack
- Faunus
- Queen Urkzaa
- Jjuno The Crusher
- Malachi Cinderhorn
- Aza Spiritbender
- Freyja of Deadhall
- Cavern Dwarf Legion Builder
- Cavern Dwarf Legion Builder 6-pack
- Barbarian Warrior Builder
- Artemyss Silverchord
- Herra Serpenspire
- Brother Mandibulus
- Xarria
- Goblin Legion Builder
- Goblin Legion Builder 6-pack
- Knubnik
- Gonxx
- Elf Weapon Pack
- Dwarf Weapon Pack
- Knight Weapon Pack
- Dark Forces Weapon Pack

==== Other Original Lines ====
Other lines that have been shown during Fan Ex voting but have not had any other information about the made public at this thine include:

- Chrysalis
- Zodiac Pack
- Alien Line

=== Licensed Lines ===
==== The Outer Space Men ====
Licensed from their original creator, Mel Birnkrant in 2010, The Outer Space Men take a new look at the 1968 action figure line by the Colorforms company. Using Mel's designs and a new joint technology created by Onell Designs called Glyos, Four Horsemen Toy Design Studios produced a new line of figures with interchangeable parts.

==== Power Lords ====
The Power Lords license was acquired in 2012 and the first figures went into production in 2013. Working again with the original designer of a classic toy line (this time with Wayne Douglas Barlowe) and the Glyos joint system from Onell Design, Four Horsemen Toy Design Studios added to both giving us new characters and the expanded Glyos joint system.

=== Work For Mattel ===
==== DC Comics Lines ====
Mattel has commissioned Four Horsemen Studios for most if not all the figures in the DC Comics lines including Man of Steel, Dark Knight Rises. DC Universe Classics, and Young Justice.

==== Masters of the Universe ====
Four Horsemen Studios were responsible for the figure sculpts of the 200x re-imaging of Mattel's Masters of the Universe toy line and helped bring about the Masters of the Universe Classics, an Adult Collectors figure line. They will continue to work for Mattel in the new 2015 Club 200X line.

==== Thundercats ====
4H Studios are currently sculpting all the figures for Mattel's Thundercats line, which is being sold exclusively on Mattel's direct-to-consumer site MattyCollector.com. The characters are in scale with Mattel's Masters of the Universe Classics figures. Thundercats is licensed to Mattel by Warner Bros.

==== Max Steel (Overseas Figures) ====
Many of the Gigantor figures that were part of the Max Steel line in Europe and Latin America are sculpts by members of Four Horsemen Studios

=== Work For Others ===
==== NECA ====
NECA Four Horsemen Studios were contracted to sculpt the Teenage Mutant Ninja Turtles line in 2008.

==== Toy Biz ====
Several figures that were part of the Toy Biz Marvel Comics lines from 2001 to 2005 were sculpted by Four Horsemen Studios

=== The Fan Ex Project ===
In 2005 Four Horsemen Studios created a whole new way to interact with their fan base and let those fans participate in the design process called the Fantastic Exclusive Project, quickly shortened by the fan base to be called the Fan Ex Project. They started by giving the fans several original line names and brief descriptions than let the fans choose which one would be made into actual figures. Once the line was chosen fans would then decide which figure, then scale, articulation, accessories, and even repaints. The final choices would be combined into a figure and sold by the studio.

==== Fan Ex 2005 ====
The Seventh Kingdom line was the winner of the first vote in the newly created Fan Ex. The character the fans chose was Xetheus, the Champion of Mynothecea, a Minotaur from the Animal Kingdom. There were 7 variations of the figure produced in very limited numbers. There were about 250 of each figure with Xetheus himself getting around twice that.

==== Fan Ex 2006 ====
For the second year of voting Seventh Kingdom again and this time Ramathorr, Captain of the Anitherian Guard. Also from the Animal Kingdom Ramathorr was an Elephant and there were a total of nine figures offered. 4 Elephants, 2 Mutants, 1 Rhino, 1 Hippo and 1 Boar. Unfortunately production issues left many of the original figures with breakage issues. Four Horsemen Studios paid for a second production run to make sure fans ended up with quality product.

==== Fan Ex 2007 ====
In the third year a new line won the first round of voting. Gothitropolis took the stage and the big bad of the story line, Scarabus. 10 figures would be released in this year but production issues (rising costs at the Chinese factories) pushed the actual sales of these figures to 2010. In between Four Horsemen Studios offered The Time Keepers, also from Gothitropolis 2008 and Queens court, 11 ladies representing 5 of the seven Kingdoms.

==== Fan Ex on Kickstarter ====
The Fan Ex project moves its fulfillment to Kickstarter

== Members ==
- Jim Preziosi - Founding member
- Eric Treadaway - Founding member
- H. Eric (Cornboy) Mayse - Founding member
- Sherri Lynn Cook - Lead painter
- Chris Gawrych - Production manager
- Christopher Dahlberg - Founding member (Chris amicably left the company in 2012).

== Awards and honors ==
Poppies Toy Industry Awards:

- 2007 Best Male Figure Under 12" - Judges pick - Clayface
- 2008 Best Male Figure 5 - 11" - Judges pick - Donatelo
- 2009 Best Overall Line / Low End - Judges pick - DC Universe Classics
- 2009 Best Overall Line / Low End - Fan pick - DC Universe Classics
- 2009 Best Build a Figure - Judges pick - Kilowog
- 2009 Best Build a Figure - Fan pick - Kilowog
- 2010 Best Overall Line - Low End - Judges pick - Masters of the Universe Classics
- 2010 Best Overall Line - Low End - Fan pick - Masters of the Universe Classics
- 2010 Best Male Figure 5 - 11" - Judges pick - Trapjaw
- 2010 Best Female Figure Under 11" - Judges pick - Evil-Lyn
- 2010 Best Female Figure Under 11" - Fan pick - She-ra
- 2010 Best Build a Figure - Fan pick - Darkseid
- 2010 Best Overall Line - Low End - Judges pick - Masters of the Universe Classics
- 2011 Best Overall Line - Low End - Fan pick - Masters of the Universe Classics
- 2011 Best Male Figure 5 - 11" - Judges pick - Scarabus
- 2011 Best Build a Figure - Fan pick - Bane
- 2012 Best Female Figure 5" - 11" - Judges pick - Sorceress
- 2012 Best Female Figure 5" - 11" - Fan pick - Sorceress
- Toyfare Hall of Fame 2008 (inaugural class)

== See also ==
- Masters of the Universe
- Mattel
- McFarlane Toys
- Mel Birnkrant
- NECA
- Onell Design
- Outer Space Men
- Power Lords
- Wayne Barlowe
