= Toyfinity =

American toy company

- Type: Private
- Industry: Toys
- Founded: June 6, 2013; 13 years ago in Merchantville, New Jersey, United States
- Founder: John Kent
- Headquarters: Merchantville, NJ, United States
- Key people: Mike Hart (2IC); Charlie Parry (CWO)
- Products: Manglor; Robo Force; Zeroids
- Website: www.toyfinity.com

Toyfinity is an independent toy company and artist collective. They produce figure kits compatible with Onell Design's Glyos System Series. Several are former lines previously released by Ideal Toy Company. The toys are made of interchangeable parts, and hearken back to the durable, small-scale action figures of the 1980s. The figures can be described as a cross between an action figure and a Lego set.

== History ==
Toyfinity toy figures are primarily sold directly by the manufacturer, although on occasion, a release may be made available where a specially decorated figure is available elsewhere. They offer two yearly fan clubs which feature exclusive figures and news.

The company has collaborated with local artists such as Onell Design and David A. White of Mecha Zone.

In 2013, Toyfinity bought the rights to the toyline, Robo Force, from Ideal Toy Company.

In 2021, The Nacelle Company acquired the rights to the toyline, including the rights to produce Robo Force toys, books, and branded merchandise. One year later, Nacelle revealed the revitalized action figure line created by toy designer, David Vonner.

== See also ==
- Micronauts
- Art toy
- Kinkeshi
