= Power Lords =

Toy line launched in 1983

Power Lords – The Extra-Terrestrial Warriors
- Type: Action figures
- Invented by: Ned Strongin; Len Mayem; Wayne Barlowe (character designs)
- Company: Revell (1983–1985); Four Horsemen Studios (2012–2017); The Nacelle Company (2021–present)
- Country: United States
- Availability: 1983–present
- Materials: Plastic

Power Lords – The Extra-Terrestrial Warriors is a science fiction-themed action figure line produced by Revell in 1983. Revell hired Wayne Barlowe (author and artist of Barlowe's Guide to Extraterrestrials) to design the toys.

Each figure includes an action feature. Adam Power transforms into Lord Power by pressing a button that rotates his torso to reveal the Lord Power side. Shaya is a two-sided figure changed by turning her cape around and removing her helmet, while Arkus's wings flap.

== History ==
The figures were notable in that they were not based on a comic book series. DC Comics published a three-issue Power Lords comic book series beginning in December 1983. A video game, board game, jigsaw puzzle, and coloring book based on the characters were released that year.

In 2021, The Nacelle Company, known for its documentary series The Toys That Made Us, acquired the Power Lords brand with plans to produce new toys, comic books, and an animated series. The company planned to debut a new figures for the following year, but no updates had been provided.

In late 2012, toy sculptors Four Horsemen Studios acquired the license to produce new Power Lords action figures. Using the Glyos joints created by Onell Design, the new figures debuted at San Diego Comic-Con in 2013, but were cancelled after failing to reach pre-order targets. Another version was announced in 2017 and debuted at Comic-Con, but its current status is unknown.

== List of 1980s Power Lords figures ==
- Lord Adam Power (the main hero, leader of the Power Lords, from the planet Earth)
- Arkus (the main villain, evil dictator, born from a red sun)
- Shaya (the Queen of Power, from the planet Meru)
- Sydot (known as "the supreme", from the water planet Rana)
- Raygoth (the goon of doom, from the frozen planet Flozar VIII)
- Ggripptogg (the four-fisted brute, from the planet Ferrikon)
- Backattack (the brutal backstabber, from war planet Militron)
- Disguyzor (the deadly deceiver, from the Growton planet)
- Drrench (the savage soaker, from the Frigidor planet)
- Tork (the turning terror, from the planet Twearth)

== List of Power Lords: Beast Machines ==
Power Lords: Beast Machines was a sub-group of Power Lords toys released in the 1980s. Each figure features the upper half of a human or humanoid alien combined with a tank for a lower body.

- Savor (good)
- Evol (evil)
- Warbot (evil)
- Thrash (evil)

== DC Comics' Power Lords miniseries ==
Released in December 1983 and concluding in early 1984, a three-issue miniseries based on the Power Lords toyline was published by DC Comics. The series was written by Michael Fleisher, with art by Mark Texeira, Jeff Dee, and Pablo Marcos.

Issue #1: "To the Victor, the Universe"

Shaya, the Queen of Power, travels to Earth and encounters Adam Power, who is unaware that he is not human but is in fact a Power Lord. When his amnesia lifts, Adam recalls his true identity and his history with the evil dictator Arkus. Both Shaya and Adam are attacked by two of Arkus's henchmen, Raygoth and Ggripptogg. Despite defeating both attackers, Arkus overpowered them both.

Issue #2: "The Dimension of Doom"

Arkus teleports Adam and Shaya to the Dimension of Doom, where they encounter Sydot, a humanoid dinosaur-like alien determined to escape. The three form an uneasy alliance, with Shaya serving as the stabilizing force between Adam and Sydot. After battling various threats, they escape the dimension by ship. By the end of the issue, Adam Power's abilities are fully activated.

Issue #3: "All Hail Arkus, Lord of the Galaxy"

A fully transformed Adam Power flies through space alongside Shaya and Sydot toward Arkus's base. Upon arrival, Shaya and Sydot engage the guards while Arkus addresses his assembled forces. Arkus demonstrates his power by using the Volcan Rock—a massive superweapon—to destroy an inhabited planet. Lord Adam Power enters the fray, fights through Arkus's forces, and ultimately defeats Arkus in direct combat. As a final act, Adam, Shaya, and Sydot banish Arkus and his remaining lieutenants to another dimension.

== Power Lords video game for the Magnavox Odyssey 2 ==
The Power Lords video game was advertised in the third issue of the Power Lords comic in February 1984. It was released during the video game crash of 1983, near the end of the Magnavox Odyssey 2's commercial lifespan. Few copies were sold, making it one of the rarest video games of its era and the rarest title on the Magnavox Odyssey 2. Some retro gaming review sites have rated it 4.3 out of 5.

The game is a single-screen shoot-'em-up, although unlike Space Invaders and similar games, the player pilots a ship—the same vessel depicted in the Power Lords comic series—around the Volcan Rock and must shoot a large snake that fires laser beams while avoiding volcanic eruptions.

Atari 2600 and ColecoVision versions were developed but never released; only the Magnavox Odyssey 2 version reached retail.
