= The Movies That Made Us =

2019 documentary television series

- Genre: Documentary
- Written by: Benjamin J. Frost; Brian Volk-Weiss
- Directed by: Brian Volk-Weiss
- Narrated by: Donald Ian Black (Season 1); Danny Wallace (Season 2–3)
- Country of origin: United States
- Original language: English
- No. of seasons: 3
- No. of episodes: 16

Production
- Executive producers: Cisco Henson; Brian Volk-Weiss; Jay Chapman; Benjamin J. Frost
- Editors: Patrick Berry; Benjamin J. Frost; Nick Ferrell
- Running time: 45–52 minutes
- Production company: The Nacelle Company

Original release
- Network: Netflix
- Release: November 29, 2019 – October 12, 2021

The Movies That Made Us is an American documentary television series created by Brian Volk-Weiss. It is a spin-off of The Toys That Made Us. The four episode debut season of the new series is dedicated to popular films from the 1980s and 1990s, and tells the stories behind them.

== Episodes ==
=== Series overview ===
Series overview
Series	Episodes	Originally released
1	4	29 November 2019
2	4	23 July 2021
3	8	12 October 2021

=== Season 1 (2019) ===
No. overall	No. in season	Title/film	Original release date
1	1	Dirty Dancing	November 29, 2019
Participants: Miranda Garrison, assistant choreographer; Kenny Ortega, choreographer; Eleanor Bergstein, screenwriter; Linda Gottlieb, producer; Wayne Knight, actor; David Chapman, production designer; Mitchell Cannold, senior VP of production at Vestron Video; Michael Lloyd, music producer and songwriter; Dori Berinstein, VP of physical production at Vestron Video; Jeffrey L. Hayes, production manager; Bonnie Timmermann, casting director; Lisa Niemi, widow of Patrick Swayze; Jane Brucker, actress; Doro Bachrach, associate producer; Samuel G. Freedman, journalist
2	2	Home Alone	November 29, 2019
Participants: Peter Heller, former president of Hughes Entertainment; Chris Columbus, director; John Muto, production designer; Raja Gosnell, film editor; Scott M. Rosenfelt, executive producer; Tom Jacobson, former creative executive at 20th Century Fox; Janet Hirshenson, casting director; Devin Ratray, actor; Daniel Stern, actor; Julio Macat, director of photography; Jacolyn Bucksbaum, location manager; James Giovannetti Jr., assistant director; Troy Brown, stunt double for Joe Pesci; Larry Nicholas, stunt double for Macaulay Culkin
3	3	Ghostbusters	November 29, 2019
Participants: Dan Aykroyd, screenwriter and actor; Ivan Reitman, director; Joe Medjuck, associate producer; Violet Ramis, daughter of Harold Ramis; Frank Price, CEO of Columbia Pictures; Richard Edlund, VFX supervisor; Thaine Morris, pyrotechnic specialist; Mark Stetson, model shop supervisor; John Bruno, visual effects art director; Karen Rea, casting director; Ernie Hudson, actor; William Atherton, actor; Sheldon Kahn, film editor; Steve Johnson, ghost effects; Mark Bryan Wilson, ghost maker and performer; Ray Parker Jr., songwriter
4	4	Die Hard	November 29, 2019
Participants: Stephen Thorp, son of Roderick Thorp; Jeb Stuart, screenwriter; Beau Marks, unit production manager; John McTiernan, director; Steven E. de Souza, screenwriter; Arnold Rifkin, talent agent for Bruce Willis; Glenn Gordon Caron, creator of Moonlighting; Reginald VelJohnson, actor; Bonnie Bedelia, actress; William Atherton, actor; De'voreaux White, actor; Jackie Burch, casting director; Jan de Bont, director of photography; Jackson De Govia, production designer; Charlie Picerni, stunt coordinator; Richard Edlund, visual effects producer; Mark Stetson, model shop supervisor; Thaine Morris, special effects foreman

=== Season 2 (2021) ===
No. overall	No. in season	Title/film	Original release date
5	1	Back to the Future	July 23, 2021
Participants: Bob Gale, screenwriter; Caseen Gaines, author & historian; Frank Price, CEO of Columbia Pictures; Neil Canton, producer; Jane Feinberg, casting; Andrew Probert, concept designer and illustrator; Kevin Pike, special effects supervisor; Dennis E. Jones, unit producer manager; Dean Cundey, director of photography; Steve Mathis, electrical lighting technician; Claudia Wells, actress; Harry Keramidas, film editor; Ken Ralston, superior of VFX at ILM; Wes Takahashi, animator; Pamela L. Eilerson, second unit director
6	2	Pretty Woman	July 23, 2021
Participants: J. F. Lawton, screenwriter; Gary W. Goldstein, associate producer; Dori Berinstein, VP of physical production at Vestron Video; Priscilla Nedd-Friendly, film editor; Jason Alexander, actor; Mark Bellomo, pop culture expert; Sandy Isaac, assistant to Laura Ziskin; Kathleen Marshall, daughter of Garry Marshall; Ellen H. Schwartz, first assistant director; Dori Zuckerman, casting; Laura San Giacomo, actress; Hector Elizondo, actor; Roger Joseph Pugliese, production manager; Marilyn Vance, costume designer; Daniel J. Lester, costume supervisor; Mary Ellen Fields, costume shop supervisor
7	3	Jurassic Park	July 23, 2021
Participants: Jody Duncan, author & historian; Rick Carter, production designer; John Bell, art director; John Rosengrant, Stan Winston Studios; Shane Mahan, Stan Winston Studios; Steve Williams, CG animator; Mark A.Z. Dippé, co-visual effects supervisor; Phil Tippett, dinosaur supervisor; Dean Cundey, director of photography; Craig Hayes, Tippett Studios; Gerald R. Molen, producer; Sam Neill, actor; Michele Panelli-Venetis, second assistant director; Ana Maria Quintana, script supervisor; Stephen Rosenbaum, computer graphics artist
8	4	Forrest Gump	July 23, 2021
Participants: Kevin Jones, Paramount Pictures executive; Rick Carter, production designer; Stephen Galloway, dean of Chapman University Film School; Eric Roth, screenwriter; Michelle Manning, Paramount Studios executive; Wendy Finerman, producer; Ellen Lewis, casting director; Gary Sinise, actor; Charles Newirth, co-producer; Ken Ralston, visual effects supervisor; Rick Carter, production designer; Michael Conner Humphreys, actor; Don Burgess, director of photography; George Murphy, computer graphics supervisor; Stephen Rosenbaum, computer graphics artist; Arthur Schmidt, film editor; Josue Barron, veteran of Afghanistan

=== Season 3 (2021) ===
No. overall	No. in season	Title/film	Original release date
9	1	Halloween	October 12, 2021
Participants: Irwin Yablans, executive producer; Tommy Lee Wallace, editor, production design; Nick Castle, actor; Ryan Turek, horror expert; David Gordon Green, director; Charles Bornstein, actor; Louise Jaffe, script supervisor; Sean Clark, horror expert; Erica Ueland, makeup artist; Steve Mathis, best boy; Dean Cundey, cinematographer; Krishna Rao, second assistant camera; Rick Wallace, assistant director
10	2	Friday the 13th	October 12, 2021
Participants: Sean Cunningham, filmmaker; George Mansour, distributor; Irwin Yablans, executive producer; Ryan Turek, horror expert; Tom Savini, special makeup effects; Taso N Stavrakis, sfx makeup assistant; Sean Clark, horror expert; Robbi Morgan, actress; Jeannine Taylor, actress; Harry Crosby, actor; Virginia Field, production designer; Todd Strusss-Schulson, horror expert; Harry Manfredini, composer; Jay Keuper, assistant editor
11	3	A Nightmare on Elm Street	October 12, 2021
Participants: Rachel Talalay, assistant production manager; Ryan Turek, horror expert; Heather Langenkamp, actress; Sara Risher, co-producer of New Line Cinema; Rick Shaine, editor; Sean Clark, horror expert; Robert Englund, actor; Jacques Haitkin, cinematographer; Sean Cunningham, filmmaker; Amanda Wyss, actress; Jim Doyle, mechanical sfx designer; Anne H. Aherns, set decorator; Charles Bernstein, composer; Cale Boyter, New Line executive (2003-2008)
12	4	RoboCop	October 12, 2021
Participants: Edward Neumeier, writer and co-producer; Michael Miner, writer; Paul M. Sammon, vp special projects at Orion Pictures; Barbara Boyle, senior vp at Orion Pictures; Mike Medavoy, co-founder of Orion Pictures; Charles Newirth, production manager; Arne Schmidt, producer; Miles Teves, concept artist; Phil Tippett, associate producer of stop motion animation; Craig Hayes, ED209 creator, designer and fabricator; Kurtwood Smith, actor; Nancy Allen, actress; Michelle-Panelli Venetis, first assistant director; Bart Mixon, special effects makeup; Gregor Punchatz, special effects makeup; Paul McCrane, actor
13	5	Aliens	October 12, 2021
Participants: Roger Corman, co-founder of New World Pictures; Ian Nathan, author and film historian; Randall Frakes, James Cameron's friend and collaborator; Barbara Boyle, c.o.o of New World Pictures; Gale Anne Hurd, producer; JW Rinzler, author and historian; Larry Wilson, director of development at Brandywine Productions; Pat McClung, miniature technical supervisor; Sigourney Weaver, actress; Mark Rolston, actor; James Remar, actor; Jenette Goldstein, actress; William Hope, actor; Rico Ross, actor; Paul Reiser, actor; Sarah Jackson, casting intern; Carrie Henn, actress; Tom Woodruff Jr., creature effects coordinator; Alec Gillis, creature effects coordinator; Rick Lazzarini, creature effects crew; John Rosengrant & Shane Mahan, creature effects coordinators; John Richardson, special effects supervisor; Syd Mead, conceptional artist
14	6	Coming to America	October 12, 2021
Participants: Barry W. Blaustein, writer; David Sheffield, writer; Racquel J. Gates, author and historian; Mark Bellomo, pop culture expert; John Landis, director; Michael Tadross, unit production manager; George Folsey Jr., producer; Kevin Jones, Paramount junior executive; John Amos, actor; Louie Anderson, actor; Gregor Punchatz, special makeup effects; Gregg H. Bilson, prop master; Paula Abdul, choreographer; Deborah Nadoolman Landis, costume designer
15	7	The Nightmare Before Christmas (Note: These two episodes premiered on December 1, 2020 as The Holiday Movies That Made Us, but became part of season 3 later.)	October 12, 2021
Participants: Ian Nathan, author and film historian; Kathleen Gavin, co-producer; Henry Selick, director; Rick Heinrichs, visual consultant; Danny Elfman, composer, songwriter, actor; Caroline Thompson, writer; Fon Davis, miniature set builder; Kat Alioshin, production coordinator; Deane Taylor, art director; Gregg Olsson, set designer; Mike Beltzer, animator; Anthony Scott, animator; Lauren Vogt, character fabricator; Chris Sarandon, actor
16	8	Elf	October 12, 2021
Participants: David Berenbaum, writer; Jon Berg, producer; Todd Komarnicki, producer; Cale Boyter, executive producer; Greg Gardiner, director of photography; Santiago Quinones, location manager; Joe Bauer, visual effects supervisor; Kristin Bernstein, 2nd assistant director; Rusty Smith, production manager; Charlie Chiodo, stop motion animation designer; Stephen Chiodo, stop motion animation director; Edward Chiodo, stop motion animation producer
