= True Grime: Crime Scene Clean Up =

American TV documentary series (2011)

True Grime: Crime Scene Clean Up is a television documentary series on Investigation Discovery that premiered on July 19, 2011. The series follows Neal Smither, owner of Crime Scene Cleaners, and his crew as they clean up a grisly crime scene.

After the first three episodes, the series was cancelled.

== Production ==
The series was shot on location in Oakland, CA.

== Episodes ==
Only three episodes were created:

Road Rage: World Premiere: Tuesday, July 19, 2011 Crime Scene Cleaners tackle the car of a woman whose boyfriend was killed in a road rage incident.

Running Ragged: World Premiere: Tuesday, July 26, 2011 The crew is running ragged trying to clean up a decomposing body in a hoarder's house. Rookie cleaner Mike Downer worries about his job security and working a lot of gruesome late night calls.

New Blood: World Premiere: Tuesday, August 2, 2011 The crew is dispatched to disinfect the site where a decomposing body has been discovered.

== Crime Scene Cleaners ==
Smither started his company after being inspired by a scene from the film Pulp Fiction. At the time, there were very few businesses equipped to clean the aftermath of murders, suicides and decomposing bodies; the responsibility of clean up would fall on the victims family. The business originally appeared on 2003 Insomniac with Dave Attell's Oakland episode.
