= Manglor =

Action figures by the Ideal Toy Company

Manglor is a line of action figures that were introduced by Ideal Toy Company and later re-licensed by Toyfinity.

== Ideal Toys ==
Manglors were originally released by the Ideal Toy Company in 1984-85 and re-licensed by Toyfinity in 2013. The first wave consisted of Manglord (which was initially released with a playset Manglor Mountain), Manglosaurus and Manglodactyl. A second wave, packaged with plastic eggs, appeared in 1985, which included Manglodemon, Manglizard, and Manglodragon. The line consisted of flexible, unjointed (one piece), sticky, and mostly unpainted (some versions of Manglord had purple highlights) sorbothane figures that were not able to stand on their own.

The original 1980s line was controversial for its advertising that promoted that not only could the figures be stretched and squashed, but could be torn apart and "return almost like new to their original yucky selves". Consumers Union's children's publication, Penny Power, took on this claim and found that they could not get the product to live up to its advertising claims, leaving a Manglodemon in many pieces that they were unable to reassemble. The packaging of the toys encouraged children to mix and match the parts of the various Manglors, but it was not possible to get them to hold together as demonstrated. These figures also have been very hard to find in good condition.

== Toyfinity ==
In 2015, Onell Design released a "Manglors Mutation" wave under the Glyos System Series with permission from Toyfinity. It included a Neo Granthan figure, four different Skeleden figures, three unique Crayboth mini figures, and one large Super Crayboth figure. An additional fifth Skeleden figure was released exclusively through Toyfinity's Club Zeton in 2015. Color tributes included the Mangalord, Manglodemon, Manglodragon, and Manglizard. Toyfinity launched a brand new Manglors line in 2023, starting with a Manglor Core Humanoid body, offering a chance to own Manglord for the first time in forty years while still using the Glyos System Series to offer compatibility across numerous sister lines to create weird mutations similar to the original line with improvements. Due to the sellout within hours of release a five day pre-order window was offered for a Manglord re-issue and Protolord based on the Manglor Mountain version of Manglord. The Mangloskull, the first original design to join the Manglors line since its creations, debuted over a year in three stages of parts starting with the torso/head in 2024. Additional Limb Packs called Fossil Claws and Life Spikers would complete the Mangloskull character while providing new parts to also work with the base Manglor Core Humanoid design. Several toy figures were released between 2023 and 2025.

=== Toyfinity figures ===
- Manglord
  - Standard Edition: Dark Green with purple paint applications.
  - Protolord: Light Green with Dark Green paint applications.
- Manglosaurus
  - Manglosaurian Warrior DX: Tomato Red with plum paint applications.
- Manglodactyl
  - Dactylian Acolyte: Dark Purple with pink paint applications.
- Manglor Core Humanoid
  - Primitive Manglor: Light Purple with dark purple paint applications.
  - Mysterious Warlord: Light Blue with Dark Purple paint applications.
  - Bloodstone Entity Manglor: Translucent Blood Red with Red paint applications.
  - Spectre Manglor: Glow-in-the-Dark Green with Green paint applications.
  - Grymmlord Manglor: Erenjorr Orange with Light Brown paint applications.
  - Manglonator: Metallic Silver with limited paint applications.
- Mangloskull
  - Standard Edition: Bone White with Brown paint applications.
- Mangloskull Core Humanoid
  - Bone Minion: Grayskull Green with limited paint applications.
  - Necroflesh: Bone White with limited paint applications.
  - Aquaskull: Arullem Blue with Dark Blue paint applications. It came with new Fossil Claws Limb pack.
  - Skullinator: Metallic Silver with limited paint applications. It came with new Life Spikers Limb pack.
