= Sectaurs =

1985 action figures and animated series

- Created by: Lawrence Mass; Tim Clarke; Maureen Trotto
- Original work: Action figure series (1985)
- Owners: Seven Towns; Coleco (1985–89)
- Years: 1985–present

Print publications
- Comics: Sectaurs #1–8 (Marvel, 1985–86); Sectaurs Summer Special (Marvel UK, 1986); Sectaurs #1–3 (Oni Press, 2024–25)

Films and television
- Animated series: Sectaurs (5 episodes, 1985)
- Toy(s): Sectaurs action figures (Coleco, 1985–86)

Sectaurs: Warriors of Symbion is a media franchise born from a line of action figures released by Coleco in 1985. The franchise have extended to comic books and an animated series.

Created by Lawrence Mass, Tim Clarke, and Maureen Trotto, the Sectaurs world blended humanoids with insects and arachnids.

Rights to the Sectaurs franchise are currently held by Seven Towns Ltd., a Notting Hill-based British toy manufacturer.

== Premise ==
The planet Symbion is the site of a failed genetic experiment that caused insects and arachnids grow to frightening proportions and the inhabitants to take on insectoid characteristics.

Prince Dargon, ruler of the peaceful Shining Realm of Prosperon, and his allies are in conflict with the forces of Empress Devora, ruler of the Dark Domain of Synax, and her henchmen. The two factions rival each other for possession of the Hyves, fortresses of an ancient civilization holding the key to ultimate power.

Each character was "tele-bonded" with intelligent, non-anthropomorphic insect creatures called Insectoids that had a special ability. The characters and their Insectoids shared each other's "pleasure and pain", feeling empathy through a telepathic link.

There are several subtypes of Insectoid: Steeds are Insectoids large enough to be ridden by their Sectaur partners. Action Bugs are smaller partner Insectoids, which each possess a single button or crank activated feature in merchandise. Battle Bugs are Insectoids that carry an artillery weapon atop itself, with a seat for a Sectaur rider.

== Characters ==
=== Shining Realm ===
- Dargon is a Prince of the Shining Realm. He is bonded with Dragonflyer, a winged Insectoid which has a biting action. Another insectoid companion, Parafly, was sold with the variant figure Night Fighting Dargon. His weapons included a broadskall sword, shield, twin venguns (a spring-loaded gun that fires poison darts), and a slazor, a projectile weapon that throws pellets. Although Stellara is in love with Dargon, he secretly desires to marry Belana, the royal betrothed of his childhood friend Zak.
- Pinsor is a veteran warrior who rides the massive Battle Beetle, a Steed with large front arms akin to pincers. He suffered from unrequited love for Stellara, whose affections lay with Dargon.
- Zak is a captain of Prosperon's Royal Guard, until his wisecracking insolence got him replaced. Zak's childhood friend is Dargon, who is his rival for Belana's affections. His companion, Bitaur, is an Action Bug with a biting action. Zak's weapons include a Slazor, a Vengun, and a Skall shield.
- Mantor/Mantys is a "Keeper of the Way", a scholar of the ancient powers contained in the Hyves and the Ancients who created them. His companion beast is Raplor, an Action Bug with a grappling line that extends from its mouth. Mantor's weapons include a crossbow, vengun, and skall shield.
- Stellara is a female warrior. In the comic book series, it was established that Stellara's Insectoid died in battle some time ago and one story focused on her attempting to tele-bond with a new one, but was unable to complete the ritual because Dargon and the others were in danger. In the comics, Stellara is a romantic interest of Pinsor, but she thought of him as a surrogate father; her true fondness is for Dargon.
- Bodyball is a character seen only in the unreleased second wave of the toyline. Rather than being paired with an Insectoid, Bodyball was one of two figures planned to have a special action designed into the figure itself. He could be folded up, much like a pillbug, and visually seemed to be a member of a race other than his Sectaur compatriots.
- Crossbow is the Shining Realm's Battle Bug. Its projectile is a missile-like pod referred to as a "spear".
- Gyrofly is the only Creeper that was planned to be released for the Shining Realm faction in the unreleased second line. It was a scarab-like device which opened its shell and released a spinning propeller projectile named Attack-Gnat.

=== Dark Domain ===
- General Spidrax is the leader of the Dark Domain's armies, armed with a whip coated in lethal poison. Unlike most Sectaurs, he enslaved his animal companion, Spider-Flyer, rather than bond with it. This was possibly because Spidrax had no forehead antennae (which all other Sectaurs possess) with which to initiate the tele-bonding process, but also to show his cruelty. Spidrax's weapons included a venom whip, Slazor, Skall shield, net, and twin Venguns.
- Skulk is Devora's stepson, who rides the spider-like Trancula, a furry Steed with biting mandibles. His weapons included a Skall dagger, shield, Vengun, and dart wing.
- Commander Waspax is Spidrax's rival. His Insectoid companion is Wingid, an Action Bug with flapping wings. His weapons included a Skall saber, shield, and Vengun.
- Skito is a mercenary. His companion, Toxcid, is an Action Bug that squirts water from his proboscis, said to be "poison" in the context of the stories. His weapons included a Skall sword, shield, and Vengun.
- Bandor is one of the unreleased second wave figures, and it included a flail, Skall sword, and shield. His insectoid was Swipe, which was an Action Bug with an extending proboscis weapon.
- Nuckles is the other of the two figures in the second line which was to have had a built-in feature rather than an Insectoid. His feature was likely a punching action with his "Mutant Arm". Nuckle's accessories included some form of hand weapon, a shield, and two small Skalibur guns which attached to the sides of his helmet and connected to his weapons belt by power cables.
- Fly Flinger is the Dark Domain's Battle Bug, from the unreleased second series. Its projectile was a glider-like second smaller insect generically named Fly.
- Snagg is one of two Creepers planned to be released for the Dark Domain in the unreleased second wave of toys. Snagg featured a short grappling line that fired from its mouth and could be rewound into its body.
- Ax-Back is one of two Creepers planned to be released for the Dark Domain in the unreleased second wave of toys. Ax-Back featured a blade-like protrusion that snapped up from its back.

=== Hyve ===
The Hyve playset was also produced, and is one of the larger playsets released in the 1980s. Accessories included a boulder-like wrecking ball, a heavy Skalibur turret gun, a ladder, and a cage. It featured a landing pad with a trap door, a collapsible bridge, and an interior detailing a "Bio-Control Laboratory". The Hyve is guarded by Narr and Vypex, a pair of mutant Insectoids.

=== Other characters ===
- Belana is Zak's royal betrothed, who secretly (and mutually) desires Dargon.
- Devora is a Goddess-Empress of the Dark Domain and stepmother of Skulk.
- Galken rules the Shining Realm as a regent, in the absence of his elder brother Markor. He is the uncle of Dargon.
- Gnatseye is a warrior of the Shining Realm and his Insectoid companion is Jumpyr.
- Hardyn is Galken's cousin and chief adviser. He has been Supreme Tribune of the Shining Realm's Council of Judges, ever since Galken ascended to the throne.
- Markor the Mighty is a King of the Shining Realm and a father of Dargon. After disappearing years ago while searching for the Hyve, Markor was succeeded by his younger brother Galken.
- Scorpia is a villainous Keeper and Spidrax's half-sister.
- Seacor is a headstrong youth featured in the animated miniseries. He is eager to prove himself to Dargon and Company. Seacor's Insectoid companion is Altifly.
- Senrad is Devora's stealthy chief administrator.
- Slikk is a veteran thief and troublemaker whose ribald jokes, outrageous lies, and embarrassing pranks make him less than popular with his fellow Sectaurs.

== Development ==
The concept originated with puppet designer Tim Clarke, who attended a Halloween party in 1978. Disliking wearing Halloween masks, Clarke instead created a hand puppet modeled after a fly. Years later, Clarke brought the same hand puppet into a meeting with Lawrence Mass. Mass loved the idea and suggested pairing it with an action figure.

== Television series ==
In 1985, Ruby-Spears produced a five-episode animated miniseries.

With music composed by Shuki Levy and Haim Saban, the show featured characters' voices by Arthur Burghardt, Peter Cullen, Laurie Faso, Dan Gilvezan, Peter Renaday, Neil Ross, and Frank Welker.

The episodes were produced by Ken Spears and Joe Ruby, and directed by John Kimball

1. "Spidrax Attacks" (written by Dan DiStefano and Janis Diamond)
2. "Slave City" (written by Dan DiStefano and Janis Diamond)
3. "Valley of the Stones" (written by Dan DiStefano and Janis Diamond)
4. "Trapped in the Acid Desert" (written by Ted Field)
5. "Battle of the Hyve" (written by Matt Uitz and Janis Diamond)

== Comics ==
Nine mini-comics were included with Sectaurs toys in 1984. Marvel Comics published an eight-issue series from 1985 to 1986. All of the stories were written by Bill Mantlo. Mark Texeira drew the first two issues and Steve Geiger drew issues #3-8.

Marvel UK released a Sectaurs Summer Special in June 1986.

Oni Press published a three-issue miniseries in 2024–25. Part of the Nacelleverse, the series was written by Dennis Culver with art by Ramón Bachs.

== Revival ==
A Kickstarter campaign started in 2018 to restart the franchise.

In 2022, The Nacelle Company (a media business headquartered in Burbank, California) reached an exclusive agreement with rights holder Seven Towns to become licensee of Sectaurs. Their plans include to launch a new line of action figures and an animated series.
