= Mel Birnkrant =

American toy designer and collector

Mel Birnkrant (born September 18, 1937) is an American toy designer and collector. He is known for his extensive collection of Mickey Mouse and other toys of pre-World War II comics characters, and for his creation of toys such as the Outer Space Men and Baby Face.

== Personal history ==
Birnkrant was born and raised in Detroit following World War II, the son of a wealthy Jewish real estate mogul. By the time he was in sixth grade, he had grown to 6' 4" and weighed 260 lbs, making it difficult, despite his wishes, for him not to stand out.

In the 1950s, Birnkrant began collecting toys of primarily pre-World War II comics characters, beginning with a Mickey Mouse bank he found at a flea market in Paris, France. From that point he began to amass a collection of toys. He is drawn to the forms of the characters rather than their stories or personalities: "Mickey Mouse only interests me as three circles. Something you can draw with a quarter and two dimes. I can’t stand his little voice. Most Mickey Mouse collectors love goddamn Mickey Mouse. I love three circles and the fact that it looks alive."

Birnkrant attended Cranbrook Academy of Art, the University of Michigan, New York's Pratt School of Art and Design and the Académie Julian in Paris, France.

In the early 1960s, Birnkrant and his wife Eunice ran a small business in Manhattan called "Boutique Fantastique", handcrafting what Birnkrant describes as "'Authentic Reproductions' of antique toys and music boxes that never existed in the first place" and The New York Times described as "antiques that never were". Ideas for the designs, which included zoetropes, came from a variety of sources including Épinal prints, Victorian toy theaters and dancing automatons. Birnkrant started making moving toys after a visit to the Cooper Union Museum resulted in him being given permission to repair an old toy that no longer worked.

From 1964 to 1986, Birnkrant designed toys for the Colorforms company.

Birnkrant's knowledge and the extensiveness of his collection has gained the appreciation of dealers and collectors, including that of fellow Mickey Mouse collector, artist Maurice Sendak. His collection was featured in the 2004 short film Mouse Heaven directed by Kenneth Anger.
