= Baby-faced Assassin =

Baby-faced Assassin may refer to:

== Sports ==
=== Combat sports ===
- Josh Barnett, American heavyweight mixed martial arts fighter and professional wrestler
- Marco Antonio Barrera, seven-time world champion boxer
- Paul Butler (boxer), British professional boxer
- Shannon Courtenay, British professional boxer
- Jimmy McLarnin, two-time welterweight boxing champion
- Daniel Roman (boxer), professional boxer
- Johnny Tapia (1967–2012), boxer

=== Other sports ===
- Bill Corbus (1911–1998), American football player
- Stephen Curry, American professional basketball player for the Golden State Warriors
- Karim Abdel Gawad, Egyptian squash player
- Justė Jocytė, American professional basketball player for the Golden State Valkyries
- Fergal O'Brien, Irish snooker player
- Guro Reiten, Norwegian footballer
- Wayne Rooney, English former football player
- Ole Gunnar Solskjær, Norwegian former footballer

== Others ==
- Endicott Peabody, known as Chub Peabody, Harvard footballer and later politician
- Gavin Williamson, British Conservative politician
