= Baby Face (toy) =

American brand of baby dolls

Baby Face is an American brand of baby dolls that were manufactured by Galoob in 1990–1991. They were designed by toy inventor Mel Birnkrant.

Baby Face dolls are all vinyl, 13 inches tall, chubby babies with extra joints at knees and elbows in addition to joints at hips, shoulders and neck. They are strung dolls with fixed eyes and rooted hair. The Baby Face series included 20+ dolls and more than a dozen different face molds. The dolls can be identified by a number on the back of the neck.

In 1990–1991, Galoob Toys, Inc. conducted a competition for the next Baby Face Doll. The competition consisted of judging photos sent by the entrants. A second-place winner, received a Baby Face Doll that resembles the facial expression of their photo.*cited

They sold very well. However, due to events and politics within the toy industry, the dolls were discontinued in spite of the fact that they were a best seller. Baby Face dolls are collectable today. There are websites and collector clubs devoted to Baby Face dolls.

== List of dolls ==
1. 1 So Sweet Sandi - blonde hair, blue eyes
2. 1 So Sweet Marcy - lavender ponytail, blonde hair, blue eyes
3. 2 So Surprised Suzie - blonde hair, blue eyes
4. 2 So Surprised Suzie black - dark brown hair & eyes
5. 3 So Happy Heidi - dark brown hair, light brown eyes
6. 3 So Happy Mia - blonde hair, green eyes
7. 4 So Loving Laura - blonde hair, dark brown eyes
8. 5 So Funny Natalie - medium blonde hair, green eyes
9. 5 So Funny Natalie black - dark brown hair & eyes
10. 6 So Sorry Robyn - dark brown hair, brown eyes
11. 6 So Sorry Sarah - blonde hair, blue eyes
12. 6 So Sorry Sarah black - dark brown hair & eyes
13. 7 So Innocent Cynthia - blonde hair, blue eyes
14. 7 So Innocent Charlene - pink ponytail, blonde hair, brown eyes
15. 8 So Delightful Dee Dee - platinum blonde hair, lavender eyes or blue eyes
16. 8 So Delightful Dee Dee black - dark brown hair & eyes
17. 8 So Daring Denny - Boy Doll in baseball uniform, blonde hair with side part, blue eyes (sold only in France.)
18. 9 So Shy Sherri - red hair, green eyes
19. 9 So Shy Sheila - pale pink ponytail, blonde hair, blue eyes
20. 9 So Shy Sherri black - dark brown hair & eyes
21. 10 So Playful Penny - honey blonde hair, blue eyes
22. 10 So Playful Penny black - dark brown hair & eyes
23. 10 So Playful Beth - yellow ponytail, blonde hair, blue eyes
24. 14 So Cute Carmen (Hispanic) - short, curly, dark brown hair, dark brown eyes
25. 14 So Tender Tina (Hispanic) - short, curly, dark brown hair, light brown eyes
26. 15 So Caring Karen - blonde hair, blue eyes
27. 16 So Silly Sally - blue ponytail, blonde hair, blue eyes, missing some teeth
28. 17 So Merry Kerri (Asian) - short black hair, dark brown eyes
29. 17 So Excited Naomi (Asian) - long black hair, dark brown eyes
30. 20 So Happy Hannah (bathtub) - dark brown hair, brown eyes
31. 20 So Happy Hannah black (bathtub) - dark brown hair & eyes
32. 21 So Curious Cara (bathtub) - platinum hair, blue eyes
33. 21 So Curious Cara black (bathtub) - dark brown hair & eyes
34. 22 So Bashful Abby black (bathtub) - brown hair & eyes
35. 23 So Excited Becca (bathtub) - blonde hair, blue eyes
36. 23 So Excited Becca black (bathtub) - black hair, brown eyes
37. 24 So Sad Brook (bathtub) - blonde hair, brown eyes

In addition to the dolls (above) that were mass-produced in China, there were some prototype dolls that were under consideration. Some of the prototype dolls made their way into the hands of collectors and are extremely rare. So Bossy Beverly, So Whistling Wendy, Black Sally, So Cheerful Charlie and other variations nearly made it to production before the series was cancelled.

== Works cited ==
- Davis, Sue (July 1, 1999). "Identifying Your Dolls, One by One".
- Shine, Bernie (August 1, 1991). "Baby Face: A Darling New Face in the Crowd". The Collectors' Showcase magazine.
- "The Story of How Baby Face Was Born".

• Galoob, Inc. letter congratulatory.
