= The Toys That Made Us =

American documentary series

- Title screen
- Genre: Documentary
- Created by: Brian Volk-Weiss
- Directed by: Brian Volk-Weiss; Tom Stern
- Narrated by: Donald Ian Black
- Country of origin: United States
- Original language: English
- No. of seasons: 3
- No. of episodes: 12

Production
- Executive producers: Brian Volk-Weiss; Tom Stern; Cisco Henson; Anne Carkeet; Edwin Zane
- Running time: 43-51 minutes
- Production company: The Nacelle Company

Original release
- Network: Netflix
- Release: December 22, 2017 – present

The Toys That Made Us is an American documentary television series created by Brian Volk-Weiss. The first four episodes of the series began streaming on Netflix on December 22, 2017, and the next four were released on May 25, 2018. The series focuses on the history of important toylines. The first four episodes focus on the Star Wars, He-Man, Barbie, and G.I. Joe toylines with subsequent episodes featuring LEGO, Transformers, Hello Kitty, and Star Trek. The third season, with episodes featuring Power Rangers, professional wrestling, My Little Pony, and Teenage Mutant Ninja Turtles, was released on November 15, 2019.

In 2019, Netflix released a spin-off series, The Movies That Made Us, focusing on the development of classic films. A fourth and fifth season, with episodes featuring superhero toys, Nerf, Pokémon, American Greetings, Hot Wheels, Ghostbusters, Polly Pocket, and Fast Food Toys, are in development.

== Episodes ==
=== Series overview ===
Season	Episodes	Originally released
1	4	December 22, 2017
2	4	May 25, 2018
3	4	November 15, 2019

=== Season 1 (2017) ===
No. overall	No. in season	Title	Original release date
1	1	"Star Wars"	December 22, 2017
In 1977, after being rejected by Mattel and Hasbro, Lucasfilm signed with Kenner Products to have toys produced for their sci-fi film Star Wars. This was a huge gamble, as Kenner was a small toy company at the time and the negotiation process started late due to George Lucas' secrecy over the ship designs. Since then, toy sales of the Star Wars franchise have totaled to US$14 billion worldwide.
2	2	"Barbie"	December 22, 2017
In a toy industry dominated by the male demographic, Mattel co-founder Ruth Handler broke new ground in 1959 when she took a concept based on the German Bild Lilli doll and introduced the world to Barbie. The toyline has since become the largest selling doll and one of the most influential toys in modern history, selling over a billion dolls globally.
3	3	"He-Man"	December 22, 2017
Searching for a new toyline for boys to compete with Star Wars after their toylines for Clash of the Titans and Flash Gordon flopped, designers at Mattel saw inspiration from Frank Frazetta's artworks, as well as their creative imagination, and launched the Masters of the Universe action figures. The toyline dominated in sales from US$38.2 million in 1982 to US$400 million in 1986 before its demise in 1987 as a result of sales dropping to US$7 million and the critical and financial failure of the live-action film adaptation. Special guest: Dolph Lundgren
4	4	"G.I. Joe"	December 22, 2017
Introduced in 1964, Hasbro's G.I. Joe: America's Movable Fighting Man was the first action figure in toy history, but an oil crisis and declining sales led to the line's demise in 1978. Desperate to hold their own against Kenner's Star Wars line, Hasbro took inspiration from the Reagan era's Cold War to revive the line as G.I. Joe: A Real American Hero in 1982, making over US$51 million that year and becoming one of the most influential boys' toys of all time.

=== Season 2 (2018) ===
No. overall	No. in season	Title	Original release date
5	1	"Star Trek"	May 25, 2018
Since the original series went on the air in 1966, the Star Trek franchise has had a history of ups and downs in the toy business - from AMT's faithful scale model kit of the USS Enterprise to Remco's obscure tie-in merchandise, to Mego's best–selling action figure line. Following Mego's bankruptcy in 1983 and a string of flops by Ertl and Galoob, Playmates Toys picked up the toy license in the late 1980s and sparked a resurgence in the franchise's toy sales. From the mid-2000s onwards, companies such as Art Asylum and McFarlane Toys continue to keep the Star Trek toy franchise alive.
6	2	"Transformers"	May 25, 2018
In 1983, when Hasbro was looking for a fresh, new line to sell alongside G.I. Joe, they bought the license of the Diaclone and Micro Change toys from Takara, then commissioned Marvel Comics to come up with a storyline and character names for the toys. The result is Transformers. Despite Tonka releasing the cheaper GoBots line six months earlier, Hasbro's Transformers took the toy market by storm in 1984, raking in US$150 million that year. At the peak of the toyline's popularity, The Transformers: The Movie hit theaters to further capitalize on its success, but the film polarized fans and collectors with the death of Optimus Prime and majority of the original characters. As Hasbro took full control of Transformers from Takara by the late 1980s, sales declined until the toy line was discontinued in 1991. After the failed Generation 2 reboot, Beast Wars rejuvenated the franchise in 1995. In 2007, the live-action Transformers film solidified Transformers' position as Hasbro's flagship toy line. Special guest: Peter Cullen
7	3	"LEGO"	May 25, 2018
In 1949, after decades of making wooden furniture and toys, Ole Kirk Christiansen's small factory in Billund, Denmark, moved to plastic and created the "Automatic Binding Bricks", which would later be known as LEGO. When the company patented the tube system in 1958, LEGO became the dominant toyline worldwide throughout the 1960s and 1970s. When other competitors capitalized on the expiration of the company's patents in the 1980s, LEGO faced stiff competition until they reported their first loss in 1998. Poor business decisions with film licenses and the failure of the Jack Stone and Galidor lines brought LEGO to near-bankruptcy until Jørgen Vig Knudstorp took over the company and, by bringing it back to its roots, rejuvenated LEGO's profits. By the time The Lego Movie hit theaters in 2014, LEGO became the largest toy franchise in the world.
8	4	"Hello Kitty"	May 25, 2018
After leaving his job in the government, Japanese bureaucrat Shintaro Tsuji formed a toy and gift company in 1960 that would later be known as Sanrio. The company had success producing merchandise for popular manga such as Anpanman before purchasing the license for Peanuts, but after being fed up with paying royalties to Charles M. Schulz, Sanrio decided to create their own characters. In 1974, Tsuji and designer Yuko Shimizu worked on a cat-based character that eventually became Hello Kitty. Since her debut, Hello Kitty has become not only the best–selling girl's toy in Japan, but also a pop culture icon for all ages worldwide, earning at least US$5 billion a year. Special guest: Paris Hilton, Kimora Lee Simmons

=== Season 3 (2019) ===
No. overall	No. in season	Title	Original release date
9	1	"Teenage Mutant Ninja Turtles"	November 15, 2019
In 1984, Kevin Eastman and Peter Laird released the first Teenage Mutant Ninja Turtles comic book. Their self-published work quickly grabbed the attention of Surge Licensing President Mark Freedman, who saw a potential gold mine in the characters. After being rejected by LJN, Mattel, and Hasbro, Freedman got Hong Kong-based Playmates Toys to pick up the Ninja Turtles license for US$150,000. Once the violence level was toned down and the characters were given a lighter, more humorous tone, a five-episode animated series debuted on December 28, 1987. The cartoon's popularity prompted the huge demand for Ninja Turtles action figures in 1988, as toy stores had difficulty keeping them in stock. At the height of the franchise's popularity in 1990, a successful live-action film was released and over 100 million toys were sold. Eastman and Laird later split over creative differences, and the franchise was eventually purchased by Nickelodeon in 2009 for US$60 million. Special guests: Kevin Smith, Rob Paulsen, and Vanilla Ice
10	2	"Power Rangers"	November 15, 2019
Following the success of Kamen Rider, Toei Company and Bandai created the Super Sentai series in the mid-1970s, later incorporating the giant robot element from their Spider-Man series. Finding a western audience for Super Sentai, however, proved to be difficult when Stan Lee and Margaret Loesch failed to get networks to buy Taiyo Sentai Sun Vulcan. In 1984, Haim Saban bought the international distribution rights of Choudenshi Bioman from Toei, but his pilot episode was rejected by the networks. Eight years later, Saban partnered with Loesch to adapt Kyōryū Sentai Zyuranger for North America. Upon its debut in 1993, Mighty Morphin Power Rangers was a smash hit for Saban, Bandai America, and Fox Kids, with over US$1 billion in toy sales that year. The franchise was purchased by The Walt Disney Company in 2001 before being sold back to Saban in 2010, then to Hasbro in 2018, effectively ending Bandai's involvement after 25 years. Special guests: David Yost, Walter Emanuel Jones, and Andre Meadows
11	3	"My Little Pony"	November 15, 2019
During the 1970s, Hasbro was on the brink of bankruptcy due to the oil crisis. The company's Advanced R&D Department came up with My Pretty Pony, which sold 500,000 units in 1981. A year later, My Pretty Pony was shrunken down, made with softer plastic materials, and painted in bright pastel colors to become My Little Pony, which made US$80 million on its first year. In 1984, the toyline's first animated TV special Rescue at Midnight Castle was released, followed by a theatrical feature film and a TV series in 1986. My Little Pony was discontinued in 1992, but was revived in two generations with mixed results. It was in 2010 that animator Lauren Faust fully revitalized the franchise with My Little Pony: Friendship Is Magic. The show and accompanying toyline became heavily popular not only among girls, but also a male demographic known as "Bronies". Special guest: Tara Strong, Lauren Faust and John de Lancie
12	4	"Professional Wrestling"	November 15, 2019
In 1984, MCA Inc. subsidiary LJN outbid Galoob and Remco to become the first toy company to manufacture figures for the World Wrestling Federation (WWF). LJN took the 1985 Toy Fair by storm with their WWF Wrestling Superstars line. Remco counterattacked with their AWA All Star Wrestlers, but failed to outsell LJN's figures. LJN's success in the 1980s, however, was marred by the controversy surrounding their Entertech water gun line, resulting in the company's sale to Acclaim Entertainment in 1990 and the Wrestling Superstars line going to Canadian toy company Grand Toys in 1989. With LJN gone, WWF signed with Hasbro for a new line of wrestling figures that peaked at US$100 million in sales. Meanwhile, Galoob signed on to produce figures for WCW, but when David Galoob was ousted from his own company, he took the WCW license and made figures under his new company The Original San Francisco Toymakers. During the Monday Night War, WWF signed with Jakks Pacific after Hasbro decided not to renew their contract. In 1998, WCW dropped SF Toymakers in favor of Toy Biz for their figures; in turn, SF Toymakers signed with ECW in 1999. The war between wrestling figure companies ended when WWF purchased WCW and ECW in 2001. Special guests: Justin Roberts, Cody Rhodes, Taboo, Sean Waltman, and Danielle Moinet

=== Season 4 (TBA) ===
No. overall	No. in season	Title	Original release date
13	1	"Superhero Toys"	TBA
14	2	"Nerf"	TBA
15	3	"Pokémon"	TBA
16	4	"American Greetings"	TBA

=== Season 5 (TBA) ===
No. overall	No. in season	Title	Original release date
17	1	"Hot Wheels"	TBA
18	2	"Ghostbusters"	TBA
19	3	"Polly Pocket"	TBA
20	4	"Fast Food Toys"	TBA
