= Onell Design =

American toy company

- Type: Private
- Industry: Toys
- Founded: 2007; 19 years ago in Acton, Massachusetts, United States
- Founder: Matt Doughty; Michelle Doughty
- Headquarters: Acton, MA, United States
- Key people: Megan Doughty; Marc Beaudette; Jesse Moore
- Products: Glyos System Series
- Website: www.onelldesign.com

Onell Design is an independent toy company and artist collective. They produce the Glyos System Series featuring the characters Pheyden, Exellis, Crayboth, Argen, Gobon, Armodoc, Armorvor, Noboto, Buildman, Skeleden, and various others. The toys are made of interchangeable parts, and hearken back to the durable, small-scale action figures of the 1980s, such as Adventure People.

Onell Design has collaborated with international artist Real x Head in Japan.

The Glyos System Series received the #1 Best Mini Line Toy Award 2008 from the popular toy review site Plastic and Plush.

Onell Design's interchangeable vinyl piece "The Rig" was featured in MTV's Top Ten Toys of 2010.

== See also ==
- Micronauts
- Art toy
- Kinkeshi
